= National Register of Historic Places listings in Richmond, Virginia =

Location of Richmond in Virginia

This is a list of the National Register of Historic Places listings in Richmond, Virginia.

This is intended to be a complete list of the properties and districts on the National Register of Historic Places in the independent city of Richmond, Virginia, United States. The locations of National Register properties and districts for which the latitude and longitude coordinates are included below, may be seen in an online map.

There are 231 properties and districts listed on the National Register in the city, including 15 National Historic Landmarks. Another 3 properties were once listed but have been removed.

This National Park Service list is complete through NPS recent listings posted October 9, 2026.

== Current listings ==
| | Name on the Register | Image | Date listed | Location | Description |
|---|---|---|---|---|---|
| 1 | 2900 Block Grove Avenue Historic District | 2900 Block Grove Avenue Historic District | February 20, 1973 (#73002223) | 2901, 2905, 2911, and 2915 Grove Ave. 37°33′20″N 77°28′36″W | |
| 2 | Agecroft | Agecroft | December 13, 1978 (#78003186) | 4305 Sulgrave Rd. 37°33′11″N 77°30′18″W | |
| 3 | The Almshouse | The Almshouse | October 29, 1981 (#81000647) | 210 Hospital St. 37°33′11″N 77°25′50″W | |
| 4 | American Tobacco Company, South Richmond Complex Historic District | American Tobacco Company, South Richmond Complex Historic District | August 15, 2016 (#16000536) | 400-800 Jefferson Davis Highway; 37°30′31″N 77°26′52″W | |
| 5 | Armitage Manufacturing Company | Armitage Manufacturing Company | August 22, 2012 (#12000545) | 3200 Williamsburg Ave. 37°31′29″N 77°24′54″W | |
| 6 | Atlantic Motor Company | Atlantic Motor Company | November 16, 2005 (#05001271) | 1840 W. Broad St. 37°33′24″N 77°27′36″W | |
| 7 | Nathaniel Bacon School | Nathaniel Bacon School | August 24, 1992 (#92001031) | 815 N. 35th St. 37°31′51″N 77°24′17″W | |
| 8 | Baker Public School | Baker Public School | August 15, 2016 (#16000537) | 100 W. Baker St. 37°33′07″N 77°26′18″W | |
| 9 | Barret House | Barret House | February 23, 1972 (#72001517) | 15 S. 5th St. 37°32′22″N 77°26′26″W | |
| 10 | Barton Heights Cemeteries | Barton Heights Cemeteries | April 10, 2002 (#02000364) | 1600 Lamb Ave. 37°33′29″N 77°25′58″W | |
| 11 | Battery Court Historic District | Battery Court Historic District | October 9, 2003 (#02000594) | Roughly Dupont, Edgewood, Fendall, Greenwood, Griffin, Montrose, Moss Side, Noble, North, Edgehill, and Graham; 37°34′02″N 77°26′23″W | |
| 12 | William Beers House | William Beers House | April 16, 1969 (#69000346) | 1228 E. Broad St. 37°32′19″N 77°25′47″W | |
| 13 | Belgian Building | Belgian Building | February 26, 1970 (#01000439) | Lombardy St. at its junction with Brook Rd. 37°33′44″N 77°27′00″W | |
| 14 | Bell Tower | Bell Tower | June 11, 1969 (#69000347) | Capitol Sq. 37°32′20″N 77°26′07″W | |
| 15 | Belle Isle | Belle Isle | March 17, 1995 (#95000246) | James River at U.S. Routes 1/301; 37°31′45″N 77°27′13″W | |
| 16 | Blackwell Historic District | Blackwell Historic District | March 20, 2019 (#100003544) | Roughly bounded by Decatur and E. 14th Sts., Dinwiddie Ave., and Jefferson Davis Highway; 37°30′54″N 77°26′40″W | |
| 17 | Blair Tobacco Storage Warehouse Complex Historic District | Blair Tobacco Storage Warehouse Complex Historic District | August 15, 2016 (#16000538) | 2601 Maury St. 37°30′36″N 77°27′20″W | |
| 18 | Block 0-100 East Franklin Street Historic District | Block 0-100 East Franklin Street Historic District | February 27, 1980 (#80004216) | Roughly bounded by 1st, Main, Foushee, and Grace Sts. 37°32′35″N 77°26′37″W | |
| 19 | Blues Armory | Blues Armory | May 17, 1976 (#76002229) | 6th and Marshall Sts. 37°32′36″N 77°26′07″W | |
| 20 | Boulevard Historic District | Boulevard Historic District | September 18, 1986 (#86002887) | 10-300 S. Boulevard and 10-800 N. Boulevard; 37°33′23″N 77°28′29″W | |
| 21 | Branch Building | Branch Building | April 17, 1970 (#70000878) | 1015 E. Main St. 37°32′13″N 77°26′06″W | |
| 22 | Branch House | Branch House | February 23, 1984 (#84003569) | 2501 Monument Ave. 37°33′30″N 77°28′06″W | |
| 23 | Broad Street Commercial Historic District | Broad Street Commercial Historic District | April 9, 1987 (#87000611) | Along Broad St., an area roughly bounded by Belvidere, Marshall, 4th, and Grace; also 709-916 W. Broad St., 308-310 N. Laurel St., and 301-306 Gilmer St.; also the southern side of the 100 block of E. Marshall St., and the 300 blocks of 1st and 2nd Sts., between Broad and Marshall Sts. 37°32′48″N 77°26′37″W | Second and third sets of boundaries represent boundary increases of August 11, 2004 and March 27, 2007 |
| 24 | Broad Street Station | Broad Street Station | February 23, 1972 (#72001518) | Broad and Robinson Sts. 37°33′40″N 77°27′57″W | |
| 25 | Brookland Park Historic District | Brookland Park Historic District | August 6, 2003 (#02000591) | Roughly Griffin, Fendall, Hanes, Garland, North, Barton, Lamb, and Cliff Aves., and Norwood, Hooper, Essex, and Brookland Park; 37°34′20″N 77°25′57″W | |
| 26 | Joseph Bryan Park | Joseph Bryan Park | November 21, 2002 (#02001369) | 4308 Hermitage Rd. 37°35′37″N 77°28′26″W | |
| 27 | Byrd Park Court Historic District | Byrd Park Court Historic District | February 2, 2016 (#15001043) | 701, 703, and 735 Lake Rd. and 705-733 Byrd Park Ct. 37°32′37″N 77°28′16″W | |
| 28 | Byrd Theatre | Byrd Theatre | September 24, 1979 (#79003289) | 2908 W. Cary St. 37°33′09″N 77°28′40″W | |
| 29 | William Byrd Hotel | William Byrd Hotel | December 16, 1996 (#96001454) | 2501 W. Broad St. 37°33′36″N 77°27′59″W | |
| 30 | William Byrd Park | William Byrd Park | February 2, 2016 (#15001044) | 600 S. Boulevard; 37°32′40″N 77°28′40″W | |
| 31 | Henry Coalter Cabell House | Henry Coalter Cabell House | December 27, 1972 (#72001519) | 116 S. 3rd St. 37°32′24″N 77°26′37″W | |
| 32 | Henry Mansfield Cannon Memorial Chapel | Henry Mansfield Cannon Memorial Chapel | May 7, 2013 (#13000259) | 36 Westhampton Way; 37°34′28″N 77°32′20″W | |
| 33 | Carillon Neighborhood Historic District | Carillon Neighborhood Historic District | February 2, 2016 (#15001045) | Belmont, Blanton, Maplewood, Rendale, and Sunset Aves., and Carrolton, Condie, French, Garrett, Rueger, and Sheppard Sts. 37°32′40″N 77°29′06″W | |
| 34 | Carver Industrial Historic District | Carver Industrial Historic District | May 26, 2000 (#00000559) | Marshall, Lombardy, Clay, and Harrison Sts. 37°33′16″N 77°27′14″W | |
| 35 | Carver Residential Historic District | Carver Residential Historic District | April 12, 2002 (#02000365) | 700-1500 blocks of W. Leigh, the 700-1400 blocks of W. Catherine, and Clay and Marshall; also 909-1011 W. Marshall St. 37°33′10″N 77°26′58″W | W. Marshall represents a boundary increase of November 1, 2006 |
| 36 | Cary Street Park and Shop Center | Cary Street Park and Shop Center | July 5, 2001 (#01000701) | 3120-3158 W. Cary St. 37°33′14″N 77°28′53″W | |
| 37 | John B. Cary School | John B. Cary School | August 24, 1992 (#92001030) | 2100 Idlewood Ave. 37°32′48″N 77°28′09″W | |
| 38 | Cathedral of the Sacred Heart | Cathedral of the Sacred Heart | July 8, 1982 (#82004584) | Floyd Ave. and Laurel St. 37°32′51″N 77°27′08″W | |
| 39 | Centenary Church | Centenary Church | December 28, 1979 (#79003077) | 411 E. Grace St. 37°32′31″N 77°26′20″W | |
| 40 | Central National Bank | Central National Bank | September 20, 1979 (#79003290) | 3rd and Broad Sts. 37°32′37″N 77°26′24″W | |
| 41 | Chamberlayne Gardens | Chamberlayne Gardens | May 2, 2007 (#07000390) | 4301-4313 and 4315-4327 Chamberlayne Ave. and 4800-4818 Old Brook Rd. 37°35′43″N 77°26′55″W | |
| 42 | The Chesapeake Warehouses | The Chesapeake Warehouses | April 11, 2014 (#13000891) | 1100 Dinwiddie Ave. 37°30′50″N 77°26′14″W | |
| 43 | Chestnut Hill-Plateau Historic District | Chestnut Hill-Plateau Historic District | April 12, 2002 (#02000366) | 1st, 2nd, 3rd, 4th, and 5th Aves. from Brooklyn Park Boulevard to Trigg St. 37°33′47″N 77°25′14″W | |
| 44 | Church Hill North Historic District | Church Hill North Historic District | September 5, 1997 (#97000958) | Along Marshall, Clay, Leigh, and M. Sts., bounded by 21st and 30th Sts.; also roughly bounded by 25th St., T St., 32nd St., and M St. 37°31′58″N 77°24′57″W | Second set of boundaries represents a boundary increase of August 16, 2000 |
| 45 | Church of the Sacred Heart | Church of the Sacred Heart | November 20, 2002 (#02001368) | 1401 Perry St. 37°31′21″N 77°26′55″W | |
| 46 | City Hall | City Hall | October 1, 1969 (#69000327) | Bounded by 10th, Broad, 11th, and Capitol Sts. 37°32′23″N 77°25′58″W | |
| 47 | Clovelly | | March 23, 2022 (#100007540) | 337 Clovelly Rd. 37°32′48″N 77°29′53″W | |
| 48 | The Coliseum-Duplex Envelope Company Building | The Coliseum-Duplex Envelope Company Building | January 27, 1999 (#99000077) | 1339-1363 W. Broad St. 37°33′12″N 77°27′20″W | |
| 49 | Columbia | Columbia | September 16, 1982 (#82004585) | 1142 W. Grace St. 37°33′12″N 77°27′23″W | |
| 50 | Commonwealth Club Historic District | Commonwealth Club Historic District | April 7, 1983 (#83003301) | 319-415 and 400-500 W. Franklin St. 37°32′46″N 77°26′52″W | |
| 51 | Confederate Memorial Chapel | Confederate Memorial Chapel | February 23, 1972 (#72001520) | 2900 Grove Ave. 37°33′21″N 77°28′34″W | |
| 52 | Crenshaw House | Crenshaw House | August 30, 2010 (#10000585) | 919 W. Franklin St. 37°32′59″N 77°27′14″W | |
| 53 | Crozet House | Crozet House | February 23, 1972 (#72001521) | 100 E. Main St. 37°32′33″N 77°26′35″W | |
| 54 | Decatur O. Davis House | Decatur O. Davis House | May 11, 2000 (#00000490) | 1001 E. Clay St. 37°32′30″N 77°25′53″W | |
| 55 | Deep Run Hunt Club Rosedale Lodge | Deep Run Hunt Club Rosedale Lodge | May 21, 2019 (#100003977) | 1900 Avondale Ave. 37°35′08″N 77°28′09″W | |
| 56 | Department of Public Utilities Howard (Overbrook) Road Facility | Department of Public Utilities Howard (Overbrook) Road Facility | July 24, 2007 (#07000767) | 1307, 1311, 1315, 1317, and 1319 Overbrook Rd. 37°33′54″N 77°27′11″W | |
| 57 | Donnan-Asher Iron-Front Building | Donnan-Asher Iron-Front Building | February 26, 1970 (#70000879) | 1207-1211 E. Main St. 37°32′11″N 77°26′00″W | |
| 58 | Egyptian Building | Egyptian Building | April 16, 1969 (#69000321) | Southwestern corner of the junction of E. Marshall and College Sts. 37°32′21″N 77°25′46″W | |
| 59 | English Village | English Village | September 29, 1983 (#83003302) | 3418-3450 Grove Ave. 37°33′31″N 77°29′02″W | |
| 60 | Fairmount Historic District | Fairmount Historic District | February 19, 2008 (#08000075) | Roughly bounded by 24th, Y, 20th, T, R, Q, and P Sts., Fairfield and Carrington Aves., and the Mechanicsville Turnpike; 37°32′31″N 77°24′48″W | |
| 61 | Fairmount School | Fairmount School | November 9, 2005 (#05001227) | 1501 N. 21st St. 37°32′37″N 77°24′45″W | |
| 62 | Fan Area Historic District | Fan Area Historic District | September 12, 1985 (#85002243) | Roughly bounded by N. Harrison, W. Main, W. Grace, and N. Mullberry Sts.; also roughly bounded by W. Main St., S. Harrison St., the Richmond Metropolitan Expressway, and S. Boulevard; 37°32′56″N 77°28′08″W | Second set of boundaries represents a boundary increase of May 30, 1986 |
| 63 | Fifth and Main Downtown Historic District | Fifth and Main Downtown Historic District | August 30, 2006 (#06000750) | 400-500 blocks of E. Franklin St., the 400-600 blocks of E. Main St., the 00 blocks of N. 4th, 5th, and 6th Sts. and S. 5th St.; also the 00 blocks of N. 3rd, N. 4th, and S. 6th, and the 300 and 400 blocks of E. Main Sts. 37°32′26″N 77°26′24″W | Second set of boundaries represents a boundary increase of November 28, 2012 |
| 64 | First African Baptist Church | First African Baptist Church | April 16, 1969 (#69000348) | Northeastern corner of the junction of College and E. Broad Sts. 37°32′19″N 77°25′46″W | |
| 65 | First Baptist Church | First Baptist Church | April 16, 1969 (#69000349) | Northwestern corner of the junction of 12th and E. Broad Sts. 37°32′23″N 77°25′53″W | |
| 66 | First Battalion Virginia Volunteers Armory | First Battalion Virginia Volunteers Armory | December 23, 2009 (#09001158) | 122 W. Leigh St. 37°33′00″N 77°26′29″W | |
| 67 | First National Bank Building | First National Bank Building | April 12, 1982 (#82004586) | 825-27 E. Main St. 37°32′17″N 77°26′12″W | |
| 68 | Forest Hill Historic District | Forest Hill Historic District | October 3, 2012 (#12000851) | Roughly bounded by Riverside Dr., Forest Hill Park, Reedy Creek, Bassett Ave., Southcliff Rd., and Cedar Ln. 37°31′08″N 77°28′48″W | |
| 69 | Forest Hill Park | Forest Hill Park | November 22, 2002 (#02001446) | Between Riverside Dr., Forest Hill Ave., 42nd St., and 34th St. 37°31′10″N 77°28′24″W | |
| 70 | Fourth Baptist Church | Fourth Baptist Church | September 7, 1979 (#79003291) | 2800 P St. 37°32′10″N 77°24′36″W | |
| 71 | Fraternal Order of Eagles Building | Fraternal Order of Eagles Building | May 3, 2006 (#06000346) | 220 E. Marshall St. 37°32′43″N 77°26′18″W | |
| 72 | Robert Fulton School | Robert Fulton School | September 18, 2017 (#100001643) | 1000-1012 Carlisle Ave. 37°31′02″N 77°24′16″W | |
| 73 | Ginter Park Historic District | Ginter Park Historic District | September 22, 1986 (#86002688) | Roughly bounded by North Ave., Moss Side, and Hawthorne and Chamberlayne Aves., Brookland Park Boulevard, and Brook Rd.; also parts of Brook Rd. and Seminary, Chamberlayne, Montrose, Moss Side, and Noble Aves. 37°34′54″N 77°26′48″W | Second set of addresses represents a boundary increase of June 5, 2017 |
| 74 | Ginter Park Terrace Historic District | Ginter Park Terrace Historic District | December 4, 2004 (#04001292) | 3000 blocks of Hawthorne, Noble, Moss Side, Montrose, and Edgewood Aves. 37°34′24″N 77°26′27″W | |
| 75 | Ellen Glasgow House | Ellen Glasgow House | November 11, 1971 (#71001041) | 1 W. Main St. 37°32′35″N 77°26′41″W | |
| 76 | Gordon-Baughan-Warren House | Gordon-Baughan-Warren House | February 1, 2006 (#05001621) | 6303 Towana Rd. 37°34′38″N 77°31′40″W | |
| 77 | Governor's Mansion | Governor's Mansion | June 4, 1969 (#69000360) | Capitol Sq. 37°32′18″N 77°25′56″W | |
| 78 | Grace Hospital | Grace Hospital | August 11, 2004 (#04000856) | 401 W. Grace St. 37°32′49″N 77°26′48″W | |
| 79 | Grace Street Commercial Historic District | Grace Street Commercial Historic District | July 13, 1998 (#98000739) | Roughly bounded by Adams, Broad, 8th, and Franklin Sts.; also 626 and 700 E. Broad St., 12-118 N. 8th St., 707-715 E. Franklin St., and 2-18 and 13 W. Franklin St. 37°32′32″N 77°26′19″W | Second set of boundaries represents a boundary increase of November 12, 2009 |
| 80 | William H. Grant House | William H. Grant House | April 16, 1969 (#69000356) | 1008 E. Clay St. 37°32′31″N 77°25′51″W | |
| 81 | Elliott Grays Marker-Jefferson Davis Highway | Elliott Grays Marker-Jefferson Davis Highway | August 31, 2006 (#06000748) | Junction of Harwood St., Ingram Ave., and the Jefferson Davis Highway; 37°30′12″N 77°26′48″W | |
| 82 | General Outdoor Advertising Company Richmond Branch | General Outdoor Advertising Company Richmond Branch | April 15, 2019 (#100003615) | 1000 Jefferson Davis Highway; 37°30′22″N 77°26′52″W | |
| 83 | Green's Farm (Huntley) | Green's Farm (Huntley) | November 9, 2005 (#05001228) | 6510 Three Chopt Rd. 37°34′57″N 77°31′46″W | |
| 84 | Hancock-Wirt-Caskie House | Hancock-Wirt-Caskie House | April 17, 1970 (#70000881) | 2 N. 5th St. 37°32′26″N 77°26′24″W | |
| 85 | Hasker and Marcuse Factory | Hasker and Marcuse Factory | August 11, 1983 (#83003303) | 2401-2413 Venable St. 37°32′18″N 77°24′51″W | |
| 86 | Bolling Haxall House | Bolling Haxall House | March 16, 1972 (#72001522) | 211 E. Franklin St. 37°32′32″N 77°26′29″W | |
| 87 | Hebrew Cemetery | Hebrew Cemetery | May 5, 2006 (#06000348) | 400 Hospital St. 37°33′09″N 77°25′47″W | |
| 88 | Hermitage Road Historic District | Hermitage Road Historic District | February 9, 2006 (#06000031) | 3800-4200 blocks of Hermitage Rd. 37°35′20″N 77°27′50″W | |
| 89 | Hermitage Road Warehouse Historic District | Hermitage Road Warehouse Historic District | June 9, 2014 (#14000302) | Bounded by Hermitage and Overbrook Rds., Sherwood Ave., and Interstate 95; also Hermitage Rd., 1700 blk. of Rhoadmiller St. 37°34′07″N 77°27′32″W | Boundary increase approved October 5, 2023 |
| 90 | Hickory Hill School | | November 22, 2024 (#100011128) | 3000 East Belt Boulevard; 37°28′47″N 77°27′40″W | |
| 91 | Higgins Doctors Office Building | Higgins Doctors Office Building | May 8, 2017 (#100000987) | 3540 Floyd Ave. 37°33′30″N 77°29′14″W | |
| 92 | High-Rise for the Elderly | | February 6, 2024 (#100009501) | 1202 N. 1st Street; 37°33′12″N 77°26′01″W | |
| 93 | Highland Park Plaza Historic District | Highland Park Plaza Historic District | December 4, 2004 (#04001294) | Roughly bounded by Meadowbridge Rd., Missouri Ave., the city limits, and Detroit Ave. 37°34′29″N 77°24′58″W | |
| 94 | Highland Park Public School | Highland Park Public School | October 22, 1991 (#91001683) | 2928 2nd Ave. 37°34′10″N 77°25′09″W | |
| 95 | Holly Lawn | Holly Lawn | August 26, 1982 (#82004587) | 4015 Hermitage Rd. 37°35′22″N 77°27′48″W | |
| 96 | Holly Springs Apartments | Holly Springs Apartments | November 18, 2019 (#100004649) | 801 Holly Springs Ave. 37°30′11″N 77°27′40″W | |
| 97 | Hollywood Cemetery | Hollywood Cemetery | November 12, 1969 (#69000350) | 412 S. Cherry St. 37°32′10″N 77°27′30″W | |
| 98 | Home For Confederate Women | Home For Confederate Women | November 7, 1985 (#85002767) | 301 N. Sheppard St. 37°33′25″N 77°28′34″W | |
| 99 | Hunt-Sitterding House | Hunt-Sitterding House | September 12, 2008 (#08000877) | 901 Floyd Ave. 37°32′49″N 77°27′11″W | |
| 100 | Jackson Ward Historic District | Jackson Ward Historic District | July 30, 1976 (#76002187) | Roughly bounded by 5th, Marshall, and Gilmer Sts., and the Richmond-Petersburg Turnpike; also ½-17 E. Marshall St. and 0-24 W. Marshall St.; also the 400 blocks of 1st, 2nd, and 3rd Sts., 106-108 E. Marshall, and 411-413 N. Adams St. 37°32′52″N 77°26′28″W | Second and third sets of boundaries represent boundary increases of September 26, 2005 and May 16, 2008 |
| 101 | James River and Kanawha Canal Historic District | James River and Kanawha Canal Historic District | August 26, 1971 (#71000982) | Extends from Ship Locks to Bosher's Dam; 37°32′06″N 77°26′36″W | |
| 102 | Jefferson Hotel | Jefferson Hotel | June 4, 1969 (#69000351) | 104 W. Main St. 37°32′39″N 77°26′44″W | |
| 103 | Jerman House | Jerman House | February 2, 2016 (#15001046) | 24 Hampton Hills Ln. 37°33′53″N 77°31′36″W | |
| 104 | John Rolfe Apartments | John Rolfe Apartments | September 9, 2010 (#10000736) | 101 Tempsford Ln. 37°33′59″N 77°31′11″W | |
| 105 | Kent Road Village | Kent Road Village | August 18, 2011 (#11000549) | 920-924 N. Hamilton St. and 905-935 Kent Rd. 37°33′59″N 77°29′03″W | |
| 106 | Kent-Valentine House | Kent-Valentine House | December 18, 1970 (#70000882) | 12 E. Franklin St. 37°32′38″N 77°26′34″W | |
| 107 | Kenwyn | Kenwyn | June 1, 2018 (#100002530) | 6 Ampthill Rd. 37°33′59″N 77°30′52″W | |
| 108 | Laburnum Park Historic District | Laburnum Park Historic District | February 5, 2002 (#01001573) | Westwood, Palmyra, Confederate, Wilmington, and W. Laburnum Aves., and Chatham, Gloucester, and Lamont Sts. 37°34′52″N 77°27′23″W | |
| 109 | Laurel Meadow | Laurel Meadow | February 5, 2014 (#13001165) | 1640 Bramwell Rd. 37°29′08″N 77°30′27″W | |
| 110 | Lee Medical Building | Lee Medical Building | April 17, 2018 (#100002356) | 1805 Monument Ave. 37°33′14″N 77°27′39″W | |
| 111 | Robert E. Lee Monument | Robert E. Lee Monument | January 5, 2007 (#06001213) | 1700 Monument Ave. at the junction of Monument and Allen Aves. 37°33′14″N 77°27′36″W | |
| 112 | Leigh Street Baptist Church | Leigh Street Baptist Church | March 16, 1972 (#72001523) | 517 N. 25th St. 37°32′02″N 77°24′58″W | |
| 113 | Benjamin Watkins Leigh House | Benjamin Watkins Leigh House | April 16, 1969 (#69000352) | 1000 E. Clay St. 37°32′31″N 77°25′52″W | |
| 114 | Linden Row | Linden Row | November 23, 1971 (#71001061) | 100-114 E. Franklin St. 37°32′36″N 77°26′32″W | |
| 115 | Loews Theatre | Loews Theatre | November 20, 1979 (#79003292) | 6th and Grace Sts. 37°32′30″N 77°26′13″W | |
| 116 | Main Street Banking Historic District | Main Street Banking Historic District | June 1, 2005 (#05000527) | E. Main St. between 7th and Governors Sts.; also 700, 703, 705-711, 801, and 830-838 Main St., E., 7 7th St., S., and 28 6th St., S. 37°32′18″N 77°26′10″W | Second set of boundaries represents a boundary increase of August 27, 2013; a boundary decrease was approved September 22, 2025. |
| 117 | Main Street Station and Trainshed | Main Street Station and Trainshed | October 15, 1970 (#70000867) | 1020 E. Main St. 37°32′05″N 77°25′45″W | |
| 118 | Manchester Courthouse | Manchester Courthouse | May 8, 1998 (#98000450) | 920 Hull St. 37°31′19″N 77°26′31″W | |
| 119 | Manchester Industrial Historic District | Manchester Industrial Historic District | August 2, 2000 (#00000886) | Roughly bounded by Perry St., the James River, Mayo's Bridge, Maury St., and 10th St.; also the 700 block of Stockton St.; also parts of Decatur, Everett, Hull, Maury, and Stockton Sts., 700 Semmes Ave., 300 E. 2nd St., and the 300 blocks of E. 5th and 6th Sts. 37°31′33″N 77°26′13″W | Second and third sets of boundaries represent boundary increases of September 22, 2004 and August 1, 2012 |
| 120 | Manchester Residential and Commercial Historic District | Manchester Residential and Commercial Historic District | May 16, 2002 (#02000521) | Roughly bounded by 9th St., McDonough St., Cowardin Ave., and Stockton St.; also 1211-1217, 1301-1305, and 1418 McDonough St., 310-312 W. 12th St., 309 W. 13th St., and 314 and 400 W. 14th St.; also along Semmes Ave., Cowardin St., and Jefferson Davis Highway; 37°31′21″N 77°26′42″W | Additional boundaries represent increases approved November 1, 2006 and December 20, 2018 |
| 121 | Manchester Trucking and Commercial Historic District | | May 3, 2019 (#100003965) | Primarily along Commerce Rd. and Gordon and Dinwiddie Aves. 37°30′46″N 77°25′59″W | |
| 122 | John Marshall House | John Marshall House | October 15, 1966 (#66000916) | 9th and Marshall Sts. 37°32′31″N 77°25′59″W | |
| 123 | Mason's Hall | Mason's Hall | July 2, 1973 (#73002220) | 1807 E. Franklin St. 37°32′00″N 77°25′36″W | |
| 124 | Masonic Temple | Masonic Temple | February 10, 1983 (#83003305) | 101-107 W. Broad St. 37°32′46″N 77°26′36″W | |
| 125 | Maury Street Marker, Jefferson Davis Highway | Maury Street Marker, Jefferson Davis Highway | June 2, 2004 (#04000572) | Junction of Maury St. and the Jefferson Davis Highway; 37°30′45″N 77°26′53″W | |
| 126 | Maymont | Maymont | December 16, 1971 (#71001062) | Hampton St. (Spottswood Rd.); 37°32′04″N 77°28′42″W | |
| 127 | Milburne | Milburne | April 15, 2019 (#100003616) | 315 Lock Ln. 37°33′14″N 77°30′38″W | |
| 128 | Model Tobacco Factory | Model Tobacco Factory | April 15, 2019 (#100003617) | 1100 Jefferson Davis Highway; 37°30′18″N 77°26′51″W | |
| 129 | Monroe Park Historic District | Monroe Park Historic District | July 5, 1984 (#84003572) | Roughly bounded by Belvidere, Main, Cherry, Park, Laurel, and Franklin Sts. 37°32′48″N 77°27′01″W | |
| 130 | Monroe Ward | Monroe Ward | January 27, 2000 (#99001717) | Roughly Main and Cary St., and 3rd to Jefferson Sts. 37°32′34″N 77°26′38″W | |
| 131 | James Monroe Tomb | James Monroe Tomb | November 11, 1971 (#71001044) | Hollywood Cemetery, 412 S. Cherry St. 37°32′02″N 77°27′24″W | |
| 132 | Monument Avenue Historic District | Monument Avenue Historic District | February 16, 1970 (#70000883) | Bounded by Grace and Birch Sts., Park Ave., and Roseneath Rd.; also roughly Franklin St. from Roseneath Rd. to Cleveland St. 37°33′30″N 77°28′04″W | Franklin Street represents a boundary increase of January 17, 1991 |
| 133 | Monumental Church | Monumental Church | April 16, 1969 (#69000326) | 1224 E. Broad St. 37°32′20″N 77°25′47″W | |
| 134 | Moore's Auto Body and Paint Shop | Moore's Auto Body and Paint Shop | October 14, 1993 (#93001123) | 401 W. Broad St. 37°32′51″N 77°26′45″W | |
| 135 | Philip Morris Blended Leaf Complex Historic District | Philip Morris Blended Leaf Complex Historic District | June 5, 2017 (#100001049) | 2301 Maury St. 37°30′46″N 77°27′00″W | |
| 136 | Morson's Row | Morson's Row | June 11, 1969 (#69000354) | 219-223 Governor St. 37°32′19″N 77°25′54″W | |
| 137 | National Theater | National Theater | April 2, 2003 (#03000188) | 700-710 E. Broad St. 37°32′31″N 77°26′07″W | |
| 138 | New Pump-House | New Pump-House | November 21, 2002 (#02001366) | 1708 Pump House Dr. 37°32′12″N 77°29′10″W | |
| 139 | Ninth Street Office Building | Ninth Street Office Building | September 16, 2009 (#09000730) | 202 N. 9th St. 37°32′25″N 77°26′05″W | |
| 140 | North Court | North Court | May 7, 2013 (#13000260) | 40 Westhampton Way; 37°34′33″N 77°32′36″W | |
| 141 | North Thompson Street Historic District | North Thompson Street Historic District | September 18, 2017 (#100001644) | N. Thompson St. between Broad St. and Monument Ave. 37°34′03″N 77°28′46″W | |
| 142 | Oakwood-Chimborazo Historic District | Oakwood-Chimborazo Historic District | March 18, 2005 (#04001372) | Roughly N. 30th-N. 39th St. on Chimborazo, Meldon, Oakwood, E. Broad, Briel, E. Clay, E. Leigh, M, E. Marshall, N, O, and P Sts. 37°31′48″N 77°24′27″W | |
| 143 | Old Stone House | Old Stone House | November 14, 1973 (#73002222) | 1914 E. Main St. 37°31′56″N 77°25′34″W | |
| 144 | Oliver Chilled Plow Works Branch House | Oliver Chilled Plow Works Branch House | June 4, 2018 (#100002531) | 908 Oliver Way; 37°32′30″N 77°25′29″W | |
| 145 | Oregon Hill Historic District | Oregon Hill Historic District | February 5, 1991 (#91000022) | Roughly bounded by W. Cary St., Belvidere St., Oregon Hill Park, S. Cherry St. and S. Linden St. 37°32′24″N 77°27′07″W | |
| 146 | Pace-King House | Pace-King House | July 30, 1976 (#76002230) | 205 N. 19th St. 37°32′04″N 77°25′28″W | |
| 147 | Pine Camp Tuberculosis Hospital | Pine Camp Tuberculosis Hospital | April 4, 2003 (#03000190) | 4901 Old Brook Rd. 37°36′00″N 77°26′46″W | |
| 148 | Planters National Bank | Planters National Bank | February 10, 1983 (#83003306) | 12th and E. Main Sts. 37°32′13″N 77°26′00″W | |
| 149 | Putney Houses | Putney Houses | June 11, 1969 (#69000355) | 1010-1012 E. Marshall St. 37°32′27″N 77°25′53″W | |
| 150 | Randolph School | Randolph School | October 4, 1984 (#84000050) | 300 S. Randolph St. 37°32′37″N 77°27′36″W | |
| 151 | Reveille | Reveille | February 1, 1979 (#79003293) | 4200 Cary St. Rd. 37°33′38″N 77°29′45″W | |
| 152 | Rice House | Rice House | March 30, 1999 (#99000369) | 1000 Old Locke Lane; 37°33′21″N 77°31′02″W | |
| 153 | Richmond Academy of Medicine | Richmond Academy of Medicine | August 16, 1984 (#84003574) | 1200 E. Clay St. 37°32′28″N 77°25′46″W | |
| 154 | Richmond and Chesapeake Bay Railway Car Barn | Richmond and Chesapeake Bay Railway Car Barn | May 4, 2006 (#06000349) | 1620 Brook Rd. 37°33′30″N 77°26′48″W | |
| 155 | Richmond Locomotive and Machine Works | Richmond Locomotive and Machine Works | April 27, 2007 (#07000363) | 1331 N. Boulevard; 37°34′02″N 77°28′02″W | |
| 156 | Robinson House | Robinson House | December 24, 2013 (#13000993) | 200 N. Boulevard; 37°33′26″N 77°28′28″W | |
| 157 | Rockfalls | Rockfalls | February 21, 2017 (#100000678) | 7441 Rockfalls Dr. 37°33′00″N 77°31′31″W | |
| 158 | Ryland Hall | Ryland Hall | May 7, 2013 (#13000261) | 2 Ryland Circle; 37°34′39″N 77°32′14″W | |
| 159 | St. Alban's Hall | St. Alban's Hall | September 9, 1982 (#82004588) | 300-302 E. Main St. 37°32′29″N 77°26′29″W | |
| 160 | St. Andrew's Church | St. Andrew's Church | June 22, 1979 (#79003294) | 223, 224, and 227 S. Cherry St. 37°32′31″N 77°27′07″W | |
| 161 | St. Catherine's School | St. Catherine's School | May 4, 2007 (#07000400) | 6001 Grove Ave. 37°34′20″N 77°31′16″W | |
| 162 | St. Christopher's School | St. Christopher's School | March 13, 2002 (#02000183) | 711 St. Christopher's Rd. 37°34′46″N 77°31′18″W | |
| 163 | St. John's Church Historic District | St. John's Church Historic District | September 15, 1970 (#70000884) | Bounded roughly by 22nd, Marshall, 32nd, Main, and Franklin Sts. and Williamsburg Ave.; also roughly bounded by 21st, E. Marshall, 22nd and E. Franklin Sts. 37°31′48″N 77°25′06″W | Second set of boundaries represents a boundary increase of January 17, 1991 |
| 164 | St. John's Episcopal Church | St. John's Episcopal Church | October 15, 1966 (#66000920) | E. Broad St. between 24th and 25th Sts. 37°31′53″N 77°25′11″W | |
| 165 | St. John's United Holy Church of America, Inc. | | August 21, 2024 (#100010723) | 1507 North 28th Street; 37°32′26″N 77°24′21″W | |
| 166 | St. Luke Building | St. Luke Building | September 16, 1982 (#82004589) | 900 St. James St. 37°33′04″N 77°26′13″W | |
| 167 | St. Paul's Church | St. Paul's Church | June 4, 1969 (#69000357) | 815 E. Grace St. 37°32′23″N 77°26′07″W | |
| 168 | St. Peter's Church | St. Peter's Church | June 23, 1969 (#69000358) | 800 E. Grace St. 37°32′26″N 77°26′07″W | |
| 169 | St. Sophia Home of the Little Sisters of the Poor | St. Sophia Home of the Little Sisters of the Poor | May 7, 1980 (#80004217) | 16 N. Harvie St. 37°32′50″N 77°27′31″W | |
| 170 | Scott House | Scott House | November 26, 2007 (#05001545) | 909 W. Franklin St. 37°32′58″N 77°27′12″W | |
| 171 | Scott's Addition Historic District | Scott's Addition Historic District | August 12, 2005 (#05000896) | Roughly bounded by Cutshaw Ave., Boulevard, and the former Richmond, Fredericksburg and Potomac railroad line 37°34′06″N 77°28′21″W | |
| 172 | Second Presbyterian Church | Second Presbyterian Church | March 29, 1972 (#72001525) | 9 N. 5th St. 37°32′26″N 77°26′22″W | |
| 173 | Shockoe Hill Burying Ground Historic District | Shockoe Hill Burying Ground Historic District | June 16, 2022 (#100007793) | Bounded by 2nd St., northern limit of CSX right-of-way (now the northern limit of the Virginia Passenger Rail Authority), historic property line and former stream courses. 37°33′05″N 77°25′46″W | The historic district includes the Shockoe Hill African Burying Ground, the City Hospital / Colored Alms House, Powder Magazine, as well as the formerly listed Shockoe Hill Cemetery, Hebrew Cemetery, and Alms House. |
| 174 | Shockoe Hill Cemetery | Shockoe Hill Cemetery | July 7, 1995 (#95000818) | Junction of Hospital and 2nd Sts. 37°33′05″N 77°25′56″W | |
| 175 | Shockoe Slip Historic District | Shockoe Slip Historic District | March 29, 1972 (#72001526) | Roughly along E. Carey St. between S. 14th and S. 12th Sts.; also roughly bounded by the former Seaboard Coast Line railroad tracks, the Downtown Expressway, Main, Dock, and 12th Sts.; also 11-15 and 101 S. 15th St., and 1433 E. Main St.; also the 300 block of S. 11th, 1200 and 1300 E. Byrd Sts., 1201 Haxall Pt., and the Thirteenth Street Bridge; 37°32′07″N 77°26′02″W | Second, third, and fourth sets of boundaries represent boundary increases of April 20, 1983, August 24, 2005, and August 14, 2012 |
| 176 | Shockoe Valley and Tobacco Row Historic District | Shockoe Valley and Tobacco Row Historic District | February 24, 1983 (#83003308) | Roughly bounded by Dock, 15th, Clay, Franklin, and Peach Sts. 37°31′56″N 77°25′35″W | A boundary increase was approved September 22, 2025. |
| 177 | Sixth Mount Zion Baptist Church | Sixth Mount Zion Baptist Church | December 16, 1996 (#96001445) | 14 W. Duval St. 37°33′02″N 77°26′18″W | |
| 178 | Southern Biscuit Company | Southern Biscuit Company | August 22, 2012 (#12000546) | 900 Terminal Pl. 37°33′47″N 77°28′04″W | |
| 179 | Southern Stove Works | Southern Stove Works | May 26, 2005 (#05000480) | 1215 Hermitage Rd. 37°33′41″N 77°27′34″W | |
| 180 | Southern Stove Works, Manchester | Southern Stove Works, Manchester | February 21, 2008 (#08000076) | 516-520 Dinwiddie Ave. 37°31′04″N 77°25′57″W | |
| 181 | Springfield School | Springfield School | August 24, 1992 (#92001032) | 608 N. 26th St. 37°32′03″N 77°24′55″W | |
| 182 | Springhill Historic District | Springhill Historic District | February 10, 2014 (#13001173) | W. 19th, W. 20th, W. 21st, and W. 22nd Sts., Riverside Dr., and Stonewall Ave. 37°31′24″N 77°27′16″W | |
| 183 | Steamer Company Number 5 | Steamer Company Number 5 | February 8, 1995 (#95000027) | 200 W. Marshall St. 37°32′52″N 77°26′34″W | |
| 184 | Stearns Iron-Front Building | Stearns Iron-Front Building | February 26, 1970 (#70000885) | 1007-1013 E. Main St. 37°32′14″N 77°26′06″W | |
| 185 | Stewart-Lee House | Stewart-Lee House | May 5, 1972 (#72001527) | 707 E. Franklin St. 37°32′23″N 77°26′13″W | |
| 186 | Stonewall Jackson School | Stonewall Jackson School | May 3, 1984 (#84003576) | 1520 W. Main St. 37°32′51″N 77°27′38″W | |
| 187 | Taylor Farm | Taylor Farm | January 24, 1991 (#90002158) | 4012 Walmsley Boulevard; 37°28′10″N 77°28′10″W | |
| 188 | Taylor-Mayo House | Taylor-Mayo House | April 2, 1973 (#73002221) | 110 W. Franklin St. 37°32′42″N 77°26′42″W | |
| 189 | Third Street Bethel A.M.E. Church | Third Street Bethel A.M.E. Church | June 5, 1975 (#75002117) | 616 N. 3rd St.; also 610-614 N. 3rd St. 37°32′52″N 77°26′10″W | 610-614 3rd represents a boundary increase of August 7, 2019 |
| 190 | Thomas Jefferson High School | Thomas Jefferson High School | December 23, 1993 (#93001441) | 4100 W. Grace St. 37°34′17″N 77°29′11″W | |
| 191 | Three Chopt Road Historic District | Three Chopt Road Historic District | August 14, 2012 (#12000520) | Three Chopt Rd. from Cary St. to Bandy Rd. 37°34′43″N 77°31′36″W | |
| 192 | E. M. Todd Company | E. M. Todd Company | September 14, 2002 (#02000997) | 1128 Hermitage Rd. 37°33′44″N 77°27′38″W | |
| 193 | Tower Building | Tower Building | November 24, 2017 (#100001854) | 3212 Cutshaw Ave. 37°33′57″N 77°28′32″W | |
| 194 | Town of Barton Heights Historic District | Town of Barton Heights Historic District | August 6, 2003 (#02000592) | Roughly Barton, Fendall, Greenwood, Lamb, Miller, Monterio, North, Rose, Dove, Home, Minor, Poe, Wellford, and Wickham; 37°33′37″N 77°25′57″W | |
| 195 | Tredegar Iron Works | Tredegar Iron Works | July 2, 1971 (#71001048) | 500 Tredegar St. 37°32′08″N 77°26′43″W | |
| 196 | Trinity Methodist Church | Trinity Methodist Church | April 16, 1987 (#87000625) | 2000 E. Broad St. 37°32′04″N 77°25′23″W | |
| 197 | Tuckahoe Apartments | Tuckahoe Apartments | February 2, 2001 (#01000065) | 5621 Cary St. Rd. 37°34′07″N 77°31′22″W | |
| 198 | Two Hundred Block West Franklin Street Historic District | Two Hundred Block West Franklin Street Historic District | November 17, 1977 (#77001536) | 200 block of W. Franklin St.; also 212-220 W. Main St. 37°32′43″N 77°26′45″W | Main Street represents a boundary increase of October 21, 1994 |
| 199 | U.S. Post Office and Customhouse | U.S. Post Office and Customhouse | June 4, 1969 (#69000359) | 1000 E. Main St. 37°32′16″N 77°26′05″W | |
| 200 | Union Hill Historic District | Union Hill Historic District | December 31, 2002 (#02001670) | Roughly 20th, 21st, 22nd, 23rd, 24th 25th, Jessamine, Pink, Burton, Carrington, Cedar, Clay, Jefferson, Leigh, M, and O Sts. 37°32′14″N 77°25′05″W | |
| 201 | Union Seminary | Union Seminary | April 14, 1983 (#83003309) | 3401 Brook Rd. 37°34′44″N 77°26′50″W | |
| 202 | United Daughters of the Confederacy Memorial Building | United Daughters of the Confederacy Memorial Building | April 24, 2008 (#08000341) | 328 N. Boulevard; 37°33′25″N 77°28′26″W | |
| 203 | Valentine Museum | Valentine Museum | June 11, 1969 (#69000329) | 1005-1015 E. Clay St. 37°32′29″N 77°25′51″W | |
| 204 | Virginia Commission for the Blind | Virginia Commission for the Blind | November 22, 2016 (#16000800) | 3003 Parkwood Ave. 37°33′06″N 77°28′47″W | |
| 205 | Virginia Department of Highways Building | Virginia Department of Highways Building | April 5, 2004 (#04000270) | 1401 E. Broad St. 37°32′17″N 77°25′51″W | |
| 206 | The Virginia Home | | October 14, 2026 (#100013529) | 1101 Hampton Street; 37°32′27″N 77°28′19″W | |
| 207 | Virginia House | Virginia House | June 13, 1990 (#89001933) | 4301 Sulgrave Rd. 37°33′13″N 77°30′11″W | |
| 208 | Virginia Mutual Building | Virginia Mutual Building | November 7, 1977 (#77001537) | 821 E. Main St. 37°32′18″N 77°26′13″W | |
| 209 | Virginia State Capitol | Virginia State Capitol | October 15, 1966 (#66000911) | Capitol Sq. 37°32′19″N 77°26′01″W | |
| 210 | Virginia State Library | Virginia State Library | August 9, 2005 (#05000867) | 1111 E. Broad St. 37°32′21″N 77°25′55″W | Once home to the Virginia Supreme Court; now an executive office building, the Patrick Henry Building |
| 211 | Virginia State Library-Oliver Hill Building | Virginia State Library-Oliver Hill Building | June 20, 2008 (#08000542) | 102 Governor St. 37°32′10″N 77°25′59″W | |
| 212 | Virginia Union University | Virginia Union University | July 26, 1982 (#82004590) | 1500 N. Lombardy St. 37°33′39″N 77°27′07″W | |
| 213 | Virginia War Memorial Carillon | Virginia War Memorial Carillon | October 4, 1984 (#84000053) | 1300 Blanton Ave. 37°32′27″N 77°29′00″W | |
| 214 | Virginia Washington Monument | Virginia Washington Monument | January 15, 2004 (#03001421) | Capitol Square; 37°32′22″N 77°26′02″W | |
| 215 | The Virginia | The Virginia | February 10, 1983 (#83003310) | 1 N. 5th St. 37°32′25″N 77°26′22″W | |
| 216 | Maggie L. Walker High School | Maggie L. Walker High School | September 9, 1998 (#98001160) | 1000 N. Lombardy St. 37°33′28″N 77°27′14″W | |
| 217 | Maggie Lena Walker House | Maggie Lena Walker House | May 12, 1975 (#75002100) | 110A E. Leigh St. 37°32′52″N 77°26′16″W | |
| 218 | George Washington Building | George Washington Building | May 18, 2011 (#11000297) | 1100 Bank St. 37°32′15″N 77°26′00″W | |
| 219 | Weisiger-Carroll House | Weisiger-Carroll House | May 19, 1994 (#94000454) | 2408 Bainbridge St. 37°31′00″N 77°27′20″W | |
| 220 | West Broad Street Commercial Historic District | West Broad Street Commercial Historic District | January 16, 2001 (#00001667) | 1300-1600 W. Broad St. 37°33′10″N 77°27′16″W | |
| 221 | West Broad Street Industrial and Commercial Historic District | West Broad Street Industrial and Commercial Historic District | August 18, 2011 (#11000550) | 1800-2100 blocks of Broad and Marshall Sts., bounded by Allison and Allen Sts. 37°33′26″N 77°27′37″W | |
| 222 | West Franklin Street Historic District | West Franklin Street Historic District | September 14, 1972 (#72001528) | W. Franklin St. between Laurel and Ryland Sts.; also the 900 block of W. Grace St., the 4000 block of N. Harrison St., and the 300 block of Shafer St. 37°33′00″N 77°27′13″W | Second set of boundaries represents a boundary increase of September 16, 2009 |
| 223 | West of Boulevard Historic District | West of Boulevard Historic District | March 7, 1994 (#94000153) | Roughly bounded by Colonial Ave., W. Grace St., Cutshaw Ave., Thompson St., and Ellwood Ave. 37°33′35″N 77°28′46″W | |
| 224 | Westbourne | Westbourne | January 27, 2000 (#99001721) | 330 Oak Ln. 37°34′24″N 77°30′26″W | |
| 225 | White House of the Confederacy | White House of the Confederacy | October 15, 1966 (#66000924) | Clay and 12th Sts. 37°32′27″N 77°25′46″W | |
| 226 | John Whitworth House | John Whitworth House | February 5, 1999 (#99000143) | 2221 Grove Ave. 37°33′08″N 77°28′05″W | |
| 227 | Wicker Apartments | Wicker Apartments | January 9, 2016 (#15000962) | 3905-4213 Chamberlain Ave. and 4210-4232 Old Brook Rd. 37°35′38″N 77°26′54″W | |
| 228 | Charlotte Williams Memorial Hospital | Charlotte Williams Memorial Hospital | April 9, 2004 (#04000269) | 1201 E. Broad St. 37°32′20″N 77°25′53″W | |
| 229 | Wilton | Wilton | April 30, 1976 (#76002231) | South of Richmond on the northern bank of the James River; 37°33′45″N 77°31′11″W | |
| 230 | Joseph P. Winston House | Joseph P. Winston House | June 11, 1979 (#79003295) | 101-103 E. Grace St. 37°32′38″N 77°26′31″W | |
| 231 | Woodland Heights Historic District | Woodland Heights Historic District | September 30, 2009 (#09000796) | Bounded by the James River, W. 24th St., Bainbridge St., and Forest Hill Ave., and W. 32nd and 34th Sts. 37°31′16″N 77°27′47″W | |
| 232 | Woodward House | Woodward House | June 19, 1974 (#74002243) | 3017 Williamsburg Ave. 37°31′29″N 77°25′00″W | |
| 233 | Young Women's Christian Association | Young Women's Christian Association | May 3, 1984 (#84003578) | 6 N. 5th St. 37°32′27″N 77°26′23″W | |

== Former listings ==
| | Name on the Register | Image | Date listed | Date removed | Location | City or town | Description |
|---|---|---|---|---|---|---|---|
| 1 | Manchester Cotton and Wool Manufacturing Company | Manchester Cotton and Wool Manufacturing Company | July 21, 1983 (#83003304) | March 19, 2001 | Hull Street at Mayo's Bridge | Richmond | Demolished |
| 2 | Maupin-Maury House | Maupin-Maury House | April 16, 1969 (#69000353) | February 18, 2004 | 1105 E Clay Street | Richmond | Dismantled in 1992, relocated in 1994 |
| 3 | Scott-Clarke House | Scott-Clarke House | April 13, 1972 (#72001524) | March 19, 2001 | 9 S. 5th St. | Richmond | |

== See also ==
- List of National Historic Landmarks in Virginia
- National Register of Historic Places listings in Virginia
- National Register of Historic Places listings in Chesterfield County, Virginia
- National Register of Historic Places listings in Hanover County, Virginia
- National Register of Historic Places listings in Henrico County, Virginia
