= Higgins Doctors Office Building =

Historic commercial building in Virginia, United States

- U.S. National Register of Historic Places
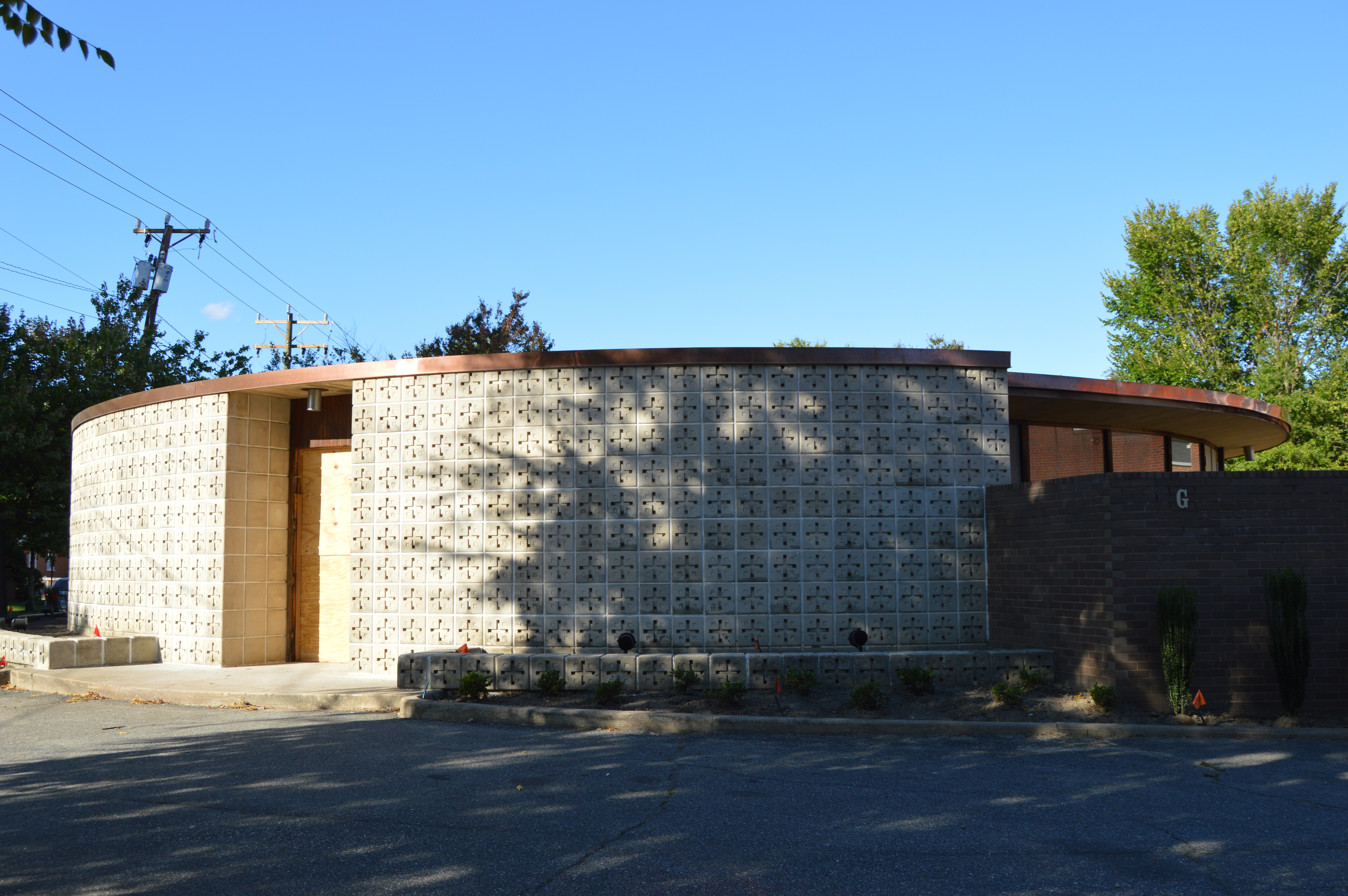

- Location within Virginia Location within the United States
- Location: 1207-1211 E. Main St., Richmond, Virginia
- Coordinates: 37°32′10″N 77°26′2″W
- Area: 0.3 acres (0.12 ha)
- Built: 1954
- Architect: Deigert & Yerkes
- Architectural style: Modern
- NRHP reference No.: 100000987
- Added to NRHP: May 8, 2017

The Higgins Doctors Office Building is a historic commercial building at 1207-1211 E. Main St. in Richmond, Virginia. Built in 1954, it is a distinctive and unusual example of a round commercial building. It is a single story in height, with a flat roof. Its exterior walls are a combination of glass windows and concrete blocks with cross motif, with outside courtyard terraces. The entrances are set in recesses. The property's landscape continues a circular theme, with flower beds, fencing, and parking arranged in concentric patterns around the structure. It was designed by the Washington, DC firm of Deigert & Yerkes.

The building was listed on the National Register of Historic Places in 2017.

== See also ==
- National Register of Historic Places listings in Richmond, Virginia
