= Rockfalls (Richmond, Virginia) =

Historic house in Virginia, United States

- U.S. National Register of Historic Places
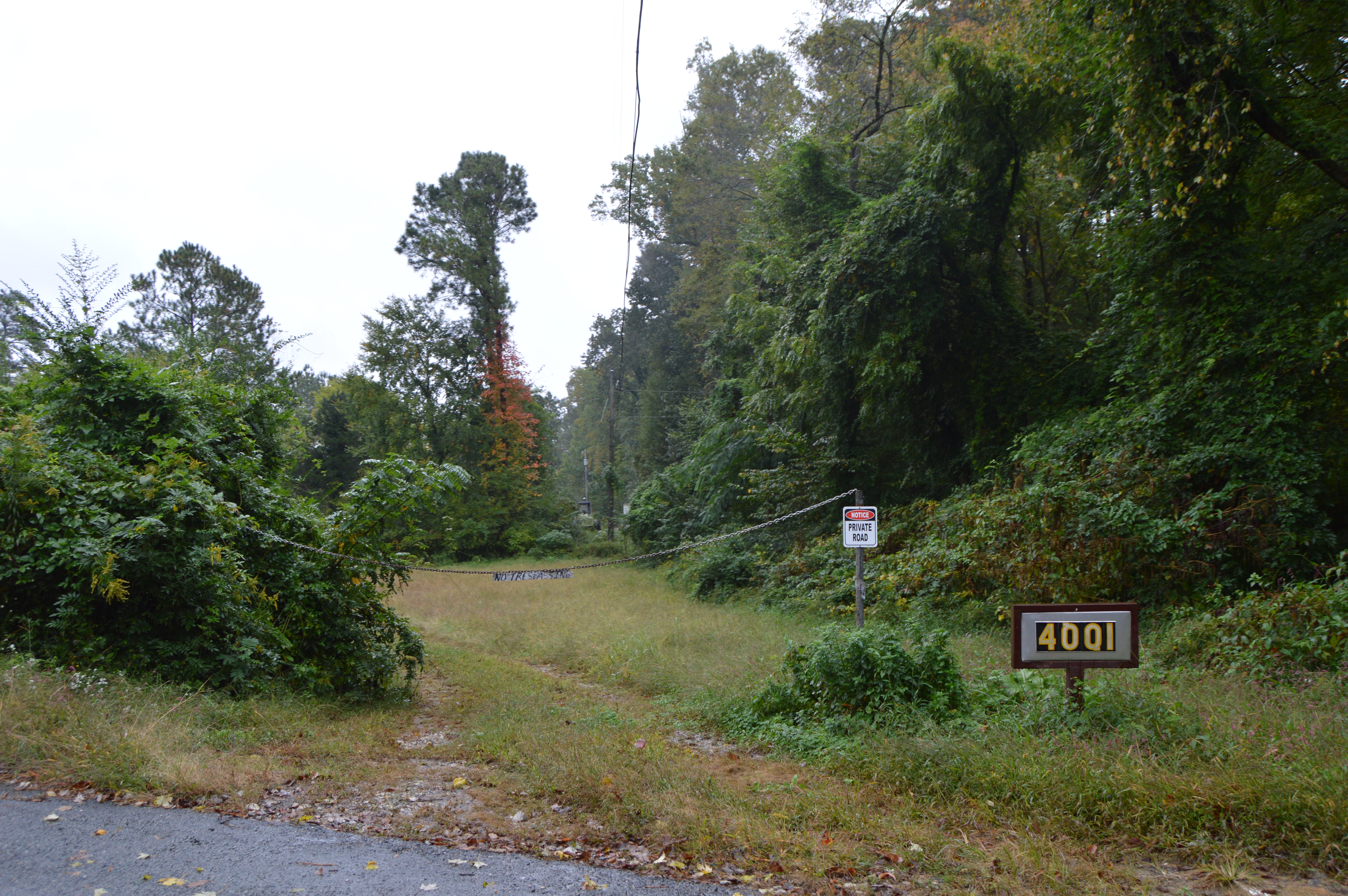
- Chellowe Drive entrance to the property

- Location within Virginia Location within the United States
- Location: 7441 Rockfalls Dr., Richmond, Virginia
- Coordinates: 37°33′0″N 77°31′31″W
- Area: 5.9 acres (2.4 ha)
- Built: 1936
- Architect: Edward Durell Stone, et al.
- Architectural style: International Style
- NRHP reference No.: 100000678
- Added to NRHP: February 21, 2017

Rockfalls is a historic house at 7441 Rockfalls Drive in Richmond, Virginia. Built in 1936–37, it is a locally prominent early example of International Style architecture, based on designs by Edward Durell Stone published in Collier's. Its exterior is primarily granite and glass, the former probably quarried from a site on the grounds. It exhibits classical International elements including a lack of adornment, emphasis on horizontality, and clean lines with some rounded surfaces.

The house was listed on the National Register of Historic Places in 2017.

== See also ==
- National Register of Historic Places listings in Richmond, Virginia
