= Philip Morris Blended Leaf Complex Historic District =

- U.S. National Register of Historic Places
- U.S. Historic district
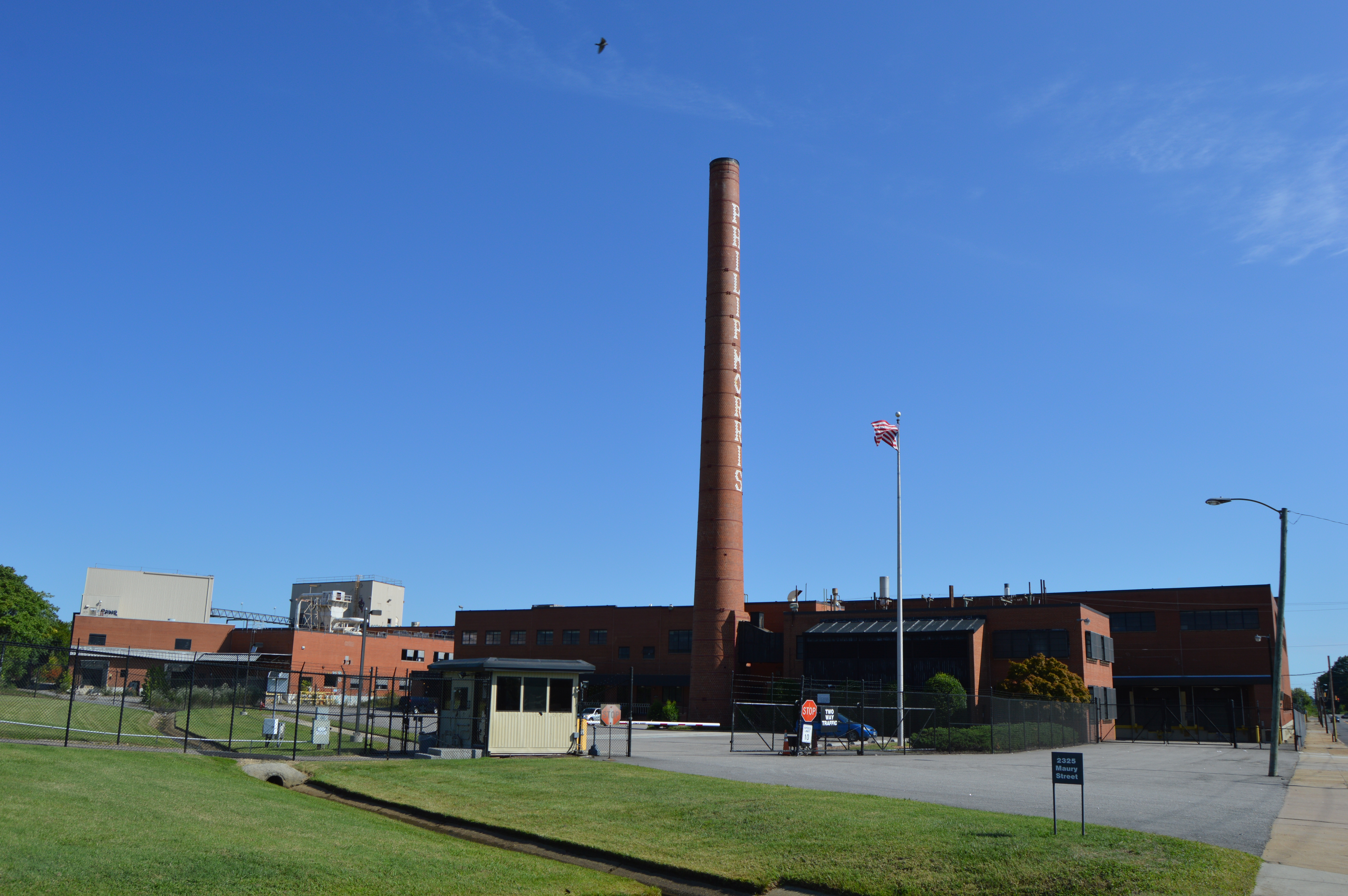

- Location within Virginia Location within the United States
- Location: 2301 Maury St., Richmond, Virginia
- Coordinates: 37°30′46″N 77°27′0″W
- Area: 12 acres (4.9 ha)
- Built: 1952
- NRHP reference No.: 100001049
- Added to NRHP: June 5, 2017

The Philip Morris Blended Leaf Complex Historic District encompasses a complex of tobacco storage and processing facilities at 2301 Maury Street in Richmond, Virginia. Included in the 12-acre (4.9 ha) site are a series of warehouses and cigarette-making factories developed beginning in the 1950s. Philip Morris USA built this complex in part to capitalize on advances in machinery that greatly increased the production speed of cigarettes.

The complex was listed on the National Register of Historic Places in 2017.

== See also ==
- National Register of Historic Places listings in Richmond, Virginia
