= Wicker Apartments =

Historic apartment complex in Virginia, United States

- U.S. National Register of Historic Places
- Virginia Landmarks Register
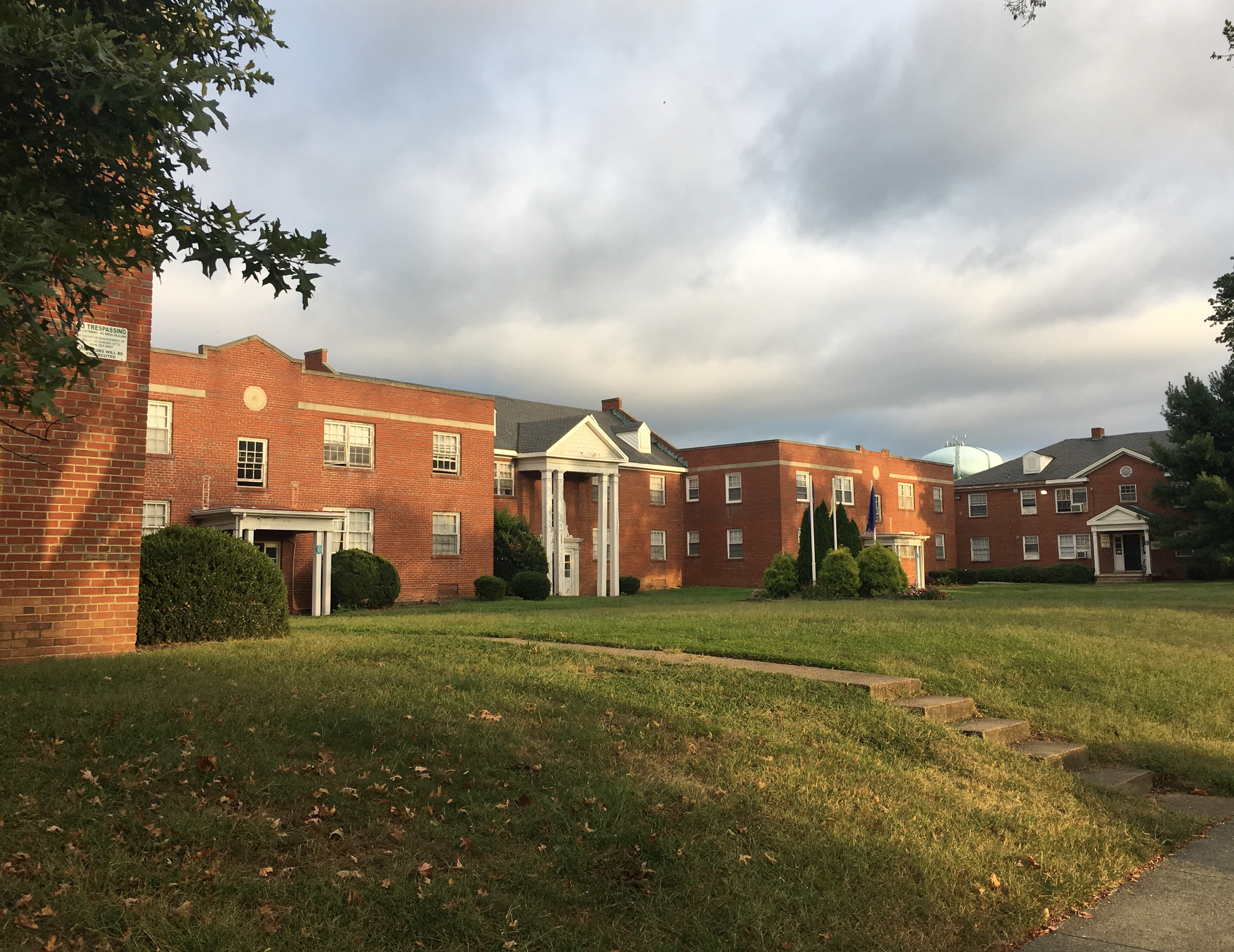

- Location within Virginia Location within the United States
- Location: 3905-4213 Chamberlayne Ave., 4210-4232 Old Brook Rd., Richmond, Virginia
- Coordinates: 37°35′33″N 77°26′53″W
- Area: 7.48 acres (3.03 ha)
- Built: 1945-1947
- Architect: Pringle, W. Harrison
- Architectural style: Colonial Revival
- NRHP reference No.: 15000962
- VLR No.: 127-6794

Significant dates
- Added to NRHP: January 9, 2016
- Designated VLR: September 17, 2015

The Wicker Apartments, later known as the Bellevue Apartments, are a historic apartment complex at 3905-4213 Chamberlain Avenue and 4210-4232 Old Brook Road in Richmond, Virginia. It is a well-preserved example of a garden apartment complex developed in the post-World War II years (1945–47) with funding support from the Federal Housing Administration. The complex includes sixteen two-story brick buildings with 144 housing units, set on spacious and handsomely landscaped property.

The complex was listed on the National Register of Historic Places in 2016.

== See also ==
- National Register of Historic Places listings in Richmond, Virginia
