= Robert Fulton School (Richmond, Virginia) =

Historic school building in Virginia, United States

- U.S. National Register of Historic Places
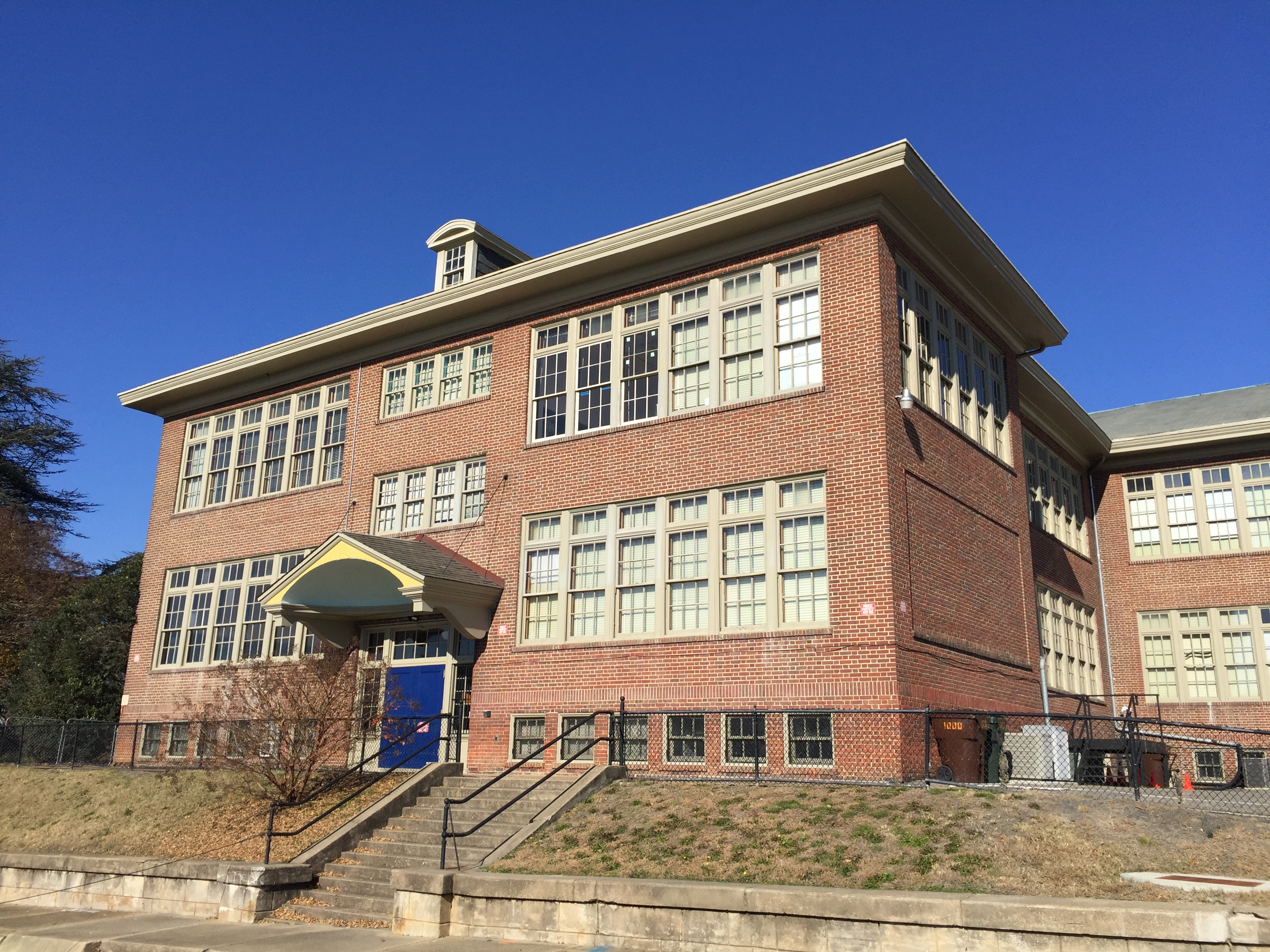
- Front entrance of the school, viewed from Carlisle Avenue

- Location within Virginia Location within the United States
- Location: 1000-1012 Carlisle Ave., Richmond, Virginia
- Coordinates: 37°31′01″N 77°24′16″W
- Area: 1.5 acres (0.61 ha)
- Built: 1917
- Architectural style: Colonial Revival
- NRHP reference No.: 100001643
- Added to NRHP: September 18, 2017

The Robert Fulton School is a historic school building at 1000-1012 Carlisle Avenue in the Fulton Hill neighborhood of Richmond, Virginia. It is a two-story T-shaped structure, built with a frame of concrete and steel and finished in brick. It was built in 1916 to a design by William Leigh Carneal, a prominent Virginia architect, as part of a school construction program instituted by longtime superintendent J.A.C. Chandler. It served as a school until 1979, at first as a segregated white school, and then as a school for African-Americans as the Fulton Hill area became increasingly black. It was integrated in 1969.

The school was listed on the National Register of Historic Places in 2017. It has been converted into residences.

== See also ==
- National Register of Historic Places listings in Richmond, Virginia
