= Chesapeake Warehouses =

- The Chesapeake Warehouses
- U.S. National Register of Historic Places
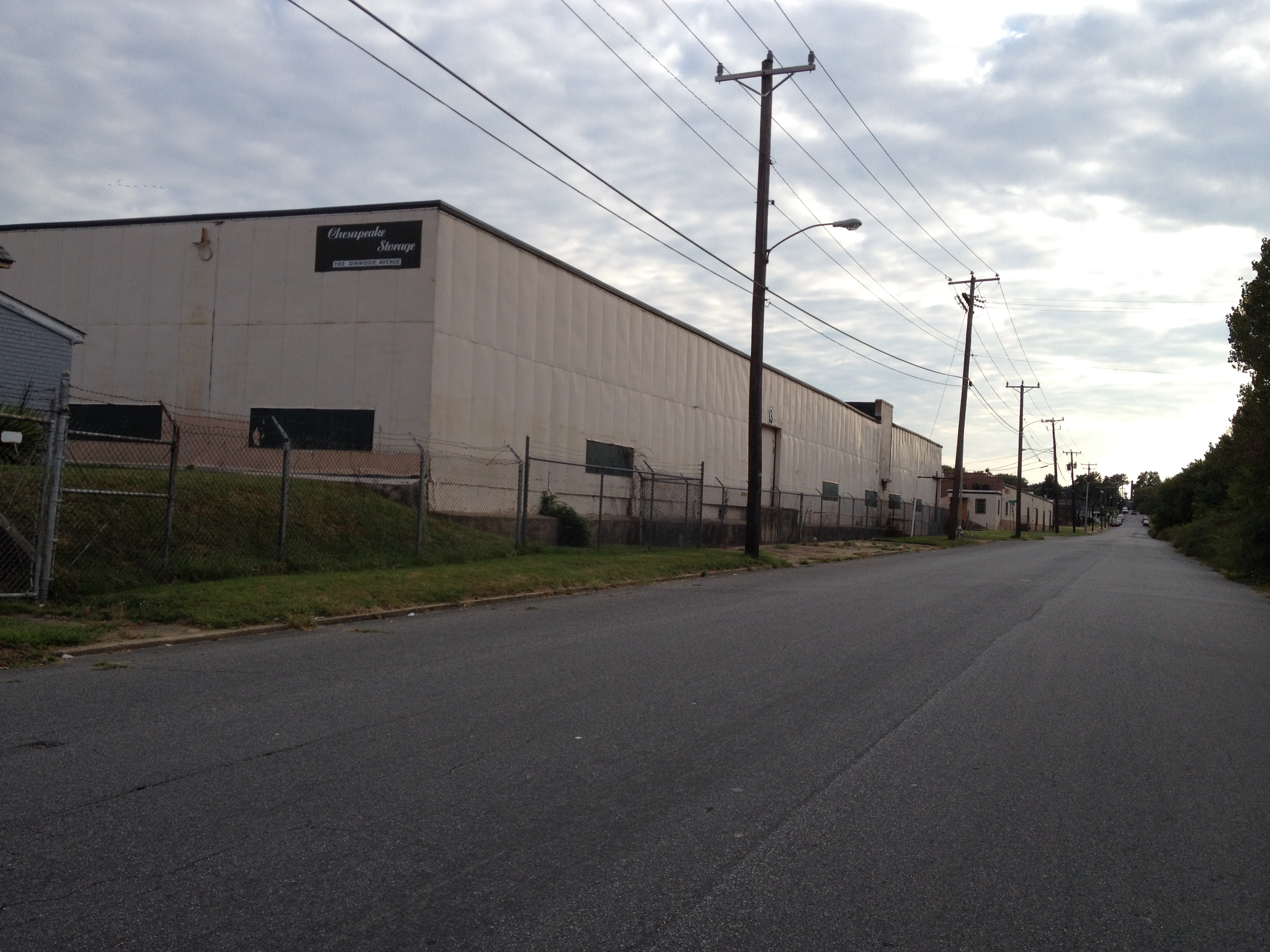

- Location within Virginia Location within the United States
- Location: 1100 Dinwiddie Ave., Richmond, Virginia
- Coordinates: 37°30′54″N 77°26′18″W
- Area: 11.1 acres (4.5 ha)
- Built: 1874
- NRHP reference No.: 13000891
- Added to NRHP: April 11, 2014

The Chesapeake Warehouses are a complex of eight former tobacco storage facilities at 1100 Dinwiddie Avenue in Richmond, Virginia. These facilities were built c. 1929, and served as storage facilities for a number of the major American tobacco companies. Each warehouse was a single-story timber frame building with galvanized sheet metal walls, and was about 20,000 square feet (1,900 m^{2}) in size. Tobacco was brought into the complex, which originally had fourteen warehouses, by rail, and was delivered to local processing plants by truck. They were in regular use until 1963, when industry practices moved away from the centralized storage of large quantities of tobacco, a practice that resulted in significant losses due to insect infestation. Six of the original warehouses were demolished due to termite infestation.

The complex was listed on the National Register of Historic Places in 2014.

== See also ==
- National Register of Historic Places listings in Richmond, Virginia
