= Blair Tobacco Storage Warehouse Complex Historic District =

- U.S. National Register of Historic Places
- U.S. Historic district
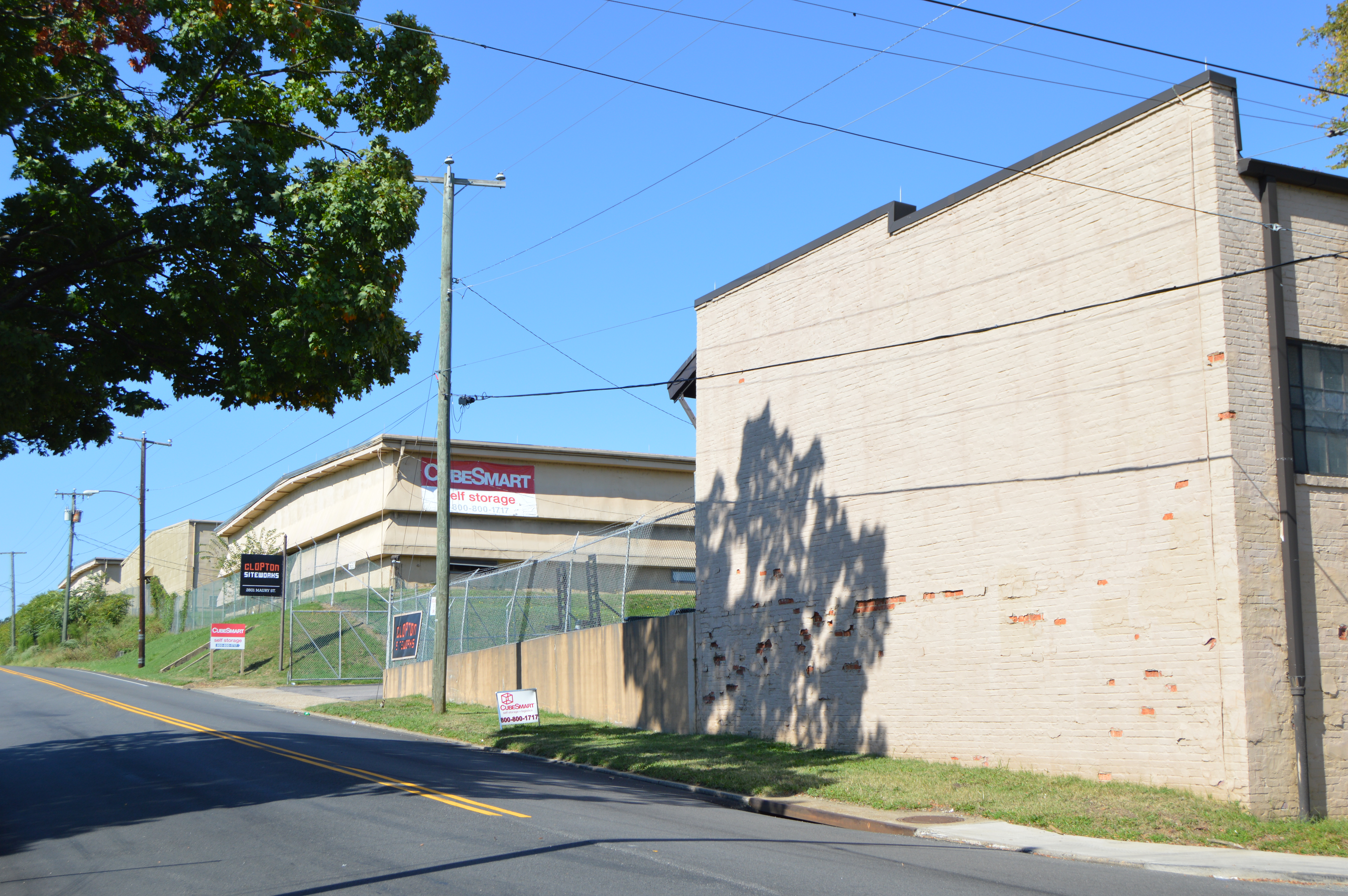

- Location within Virginia Location within the United States
- Location: 2601 Maury St., Richmond, Virginia
- Coordinates: 37°30′36″N 77°27′20″W
- Area: 26 acres (11 ha)
- Built: 1939
- NRHP reference No.: 16000538
- Added to NRHP: August 15, 2016

The Blair Tobacco Storage Warehouse Complex Historic District encompasses a complex of tobacco storage and processing facilities at 2601 Maury Street in Richmond, Virginia. Included in the 26-acre (11 ha) site are 26 large warehouses, and a number of ancillary buildings. The complex exhibits a historical range of trends in the processing and storage of tobacco, dating from its inception in 1939 into the 1980s. The Blair Storage Company was founded in 1939 by Joseph Blair, the son of a dry goods dealer, who had diversified into the transport of tobacco and other goods before opening the storage facility.

The complex was listed on the National Register of Historic Places in 2016.

== See also ==
- National Register of Historic Places listings in Richmond, Virginia
