= Jerman House =

Historic house in Virginia, United States

- U.S. National Register of Historic Places
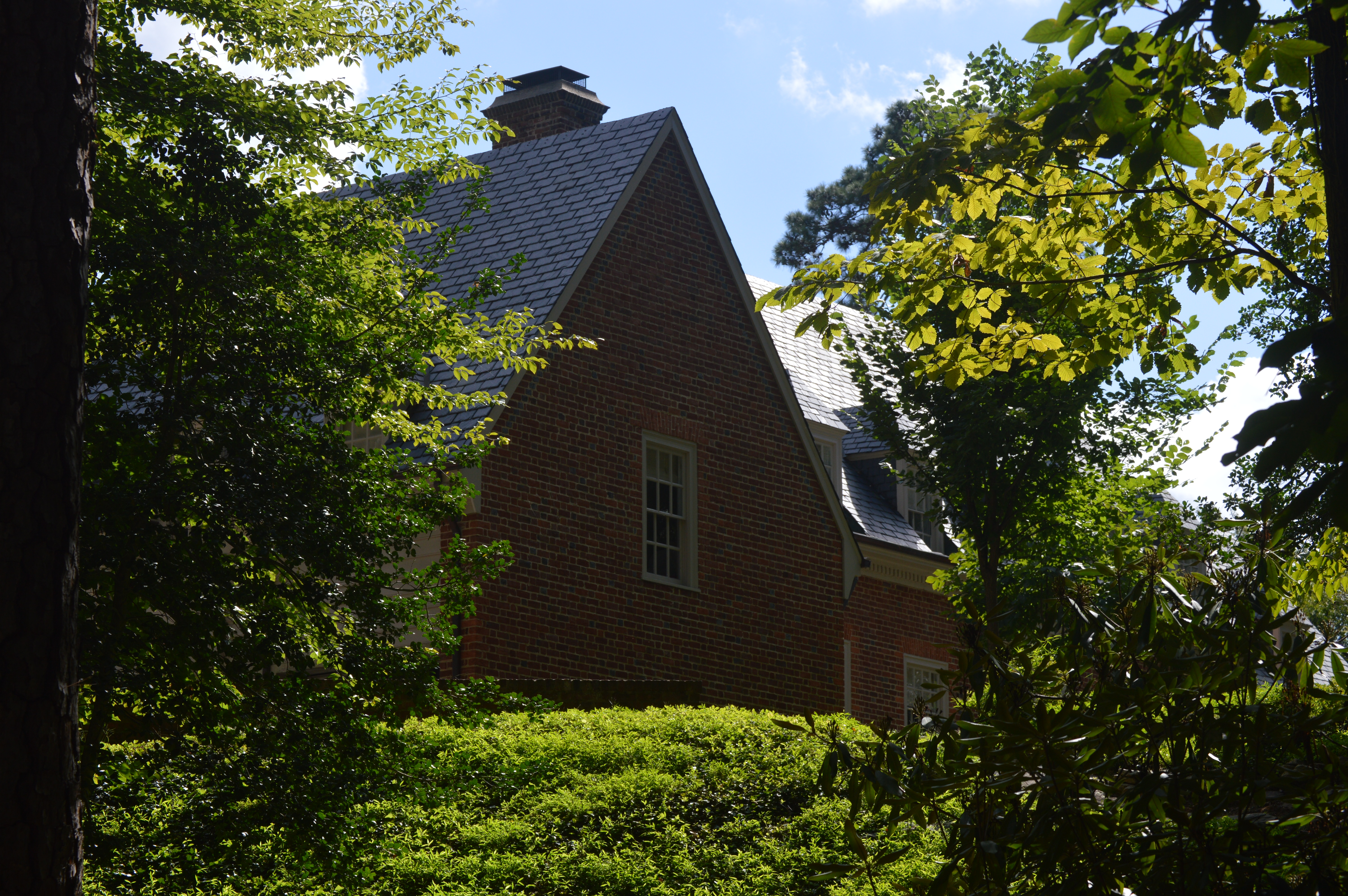
- Seen through the trees

- Location within Virginia Location within the United States
- Location: 24 Hampton Hills Ln., Richmond, Virginia
- Coordinates: 37°33′55″N 77°31′35″W
- Area: 2.2 acres (0.89 ha)
- Built: 1935
- Architect: William Lawrence Bottomley
- Architectural style: Georgian Revival
- NRHP reference No.: 15001046
- Added to NRHP: February 2, 2016

The Jerman House is a historic house overlooking the James River at 24 Hampton Hills Lane in Richmond, Virginia. It is a 1 1/2-story brick structure, with a side gable roof, and flanking 1 1/2-story wings extending to the sides at a setback. The brick is multi-tone red brick, and is laid in Flemish bond, with dark gray glazed bricks interspersed. The main entrance is at the center of the north-facing front, set in a segmented-arch opening. The house was built in 1935–36 to a design by William Lawrence Bottomley, and was the last of his commissions for Richmond-area clients.

The house was listed on the National Register of Historic Places in 2016.

== See also ==
- National Register of Historic Places listings in Richmond, Virginia
