= Holly Lawn =

Historic house in Virginia, United States

- U.S. National Register of Historic Places
- Virginia Landmarks Register
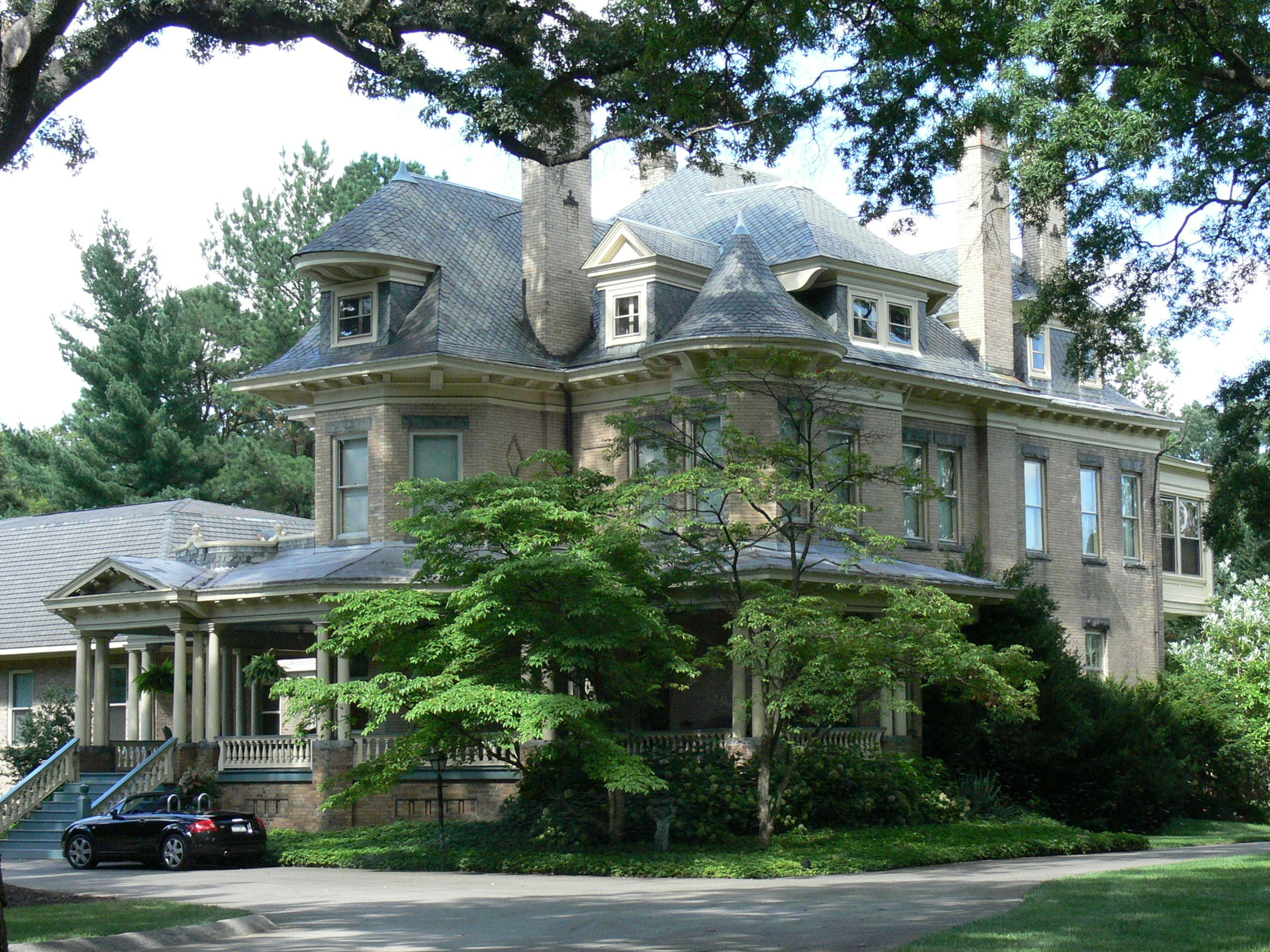
- Holly Lawn, July 2011

- Location within Virginia Location within the United States
- Location: 4015 Hermitage Rd., Richmond, Virginia
- Coordinates: 37°35′21″N 77°27′49″W
- Area: 2.5 acres (1.0 ha)
- Built: 1901; 125 years ago
- Architectural style: Queen Anne
- NRHP reference No.: 82004587
- VLR No.: 127-0055

Significant dates
- Added to NRHP: August 26, 1982
- Designated VLR: May 18, 1982

Holly Lawn, also known as the Richmond Council of Garden Clubs House, is a historic home located in Richmond, Virginia. It was built in 1901, and is a large 2 1/2-story, Queen Anne style buff-colored brick dwelling with an irregular plan and massing. It features a one-story, wrap-around porch; a two-story entrance tower topped by a pyramidal roof; and a hipped roof broken by gable-, hipped-, and conical roofed dormers with square casement windows. Holly Lawn was built for Andrew Bierne Blair, a prominent Richmond insurance agent.

It was listed on the National Register of Historic Places in 1982.
