= George Washington Building =

- U.S. National Register of Historic Places
- Virginia Landmarks Register
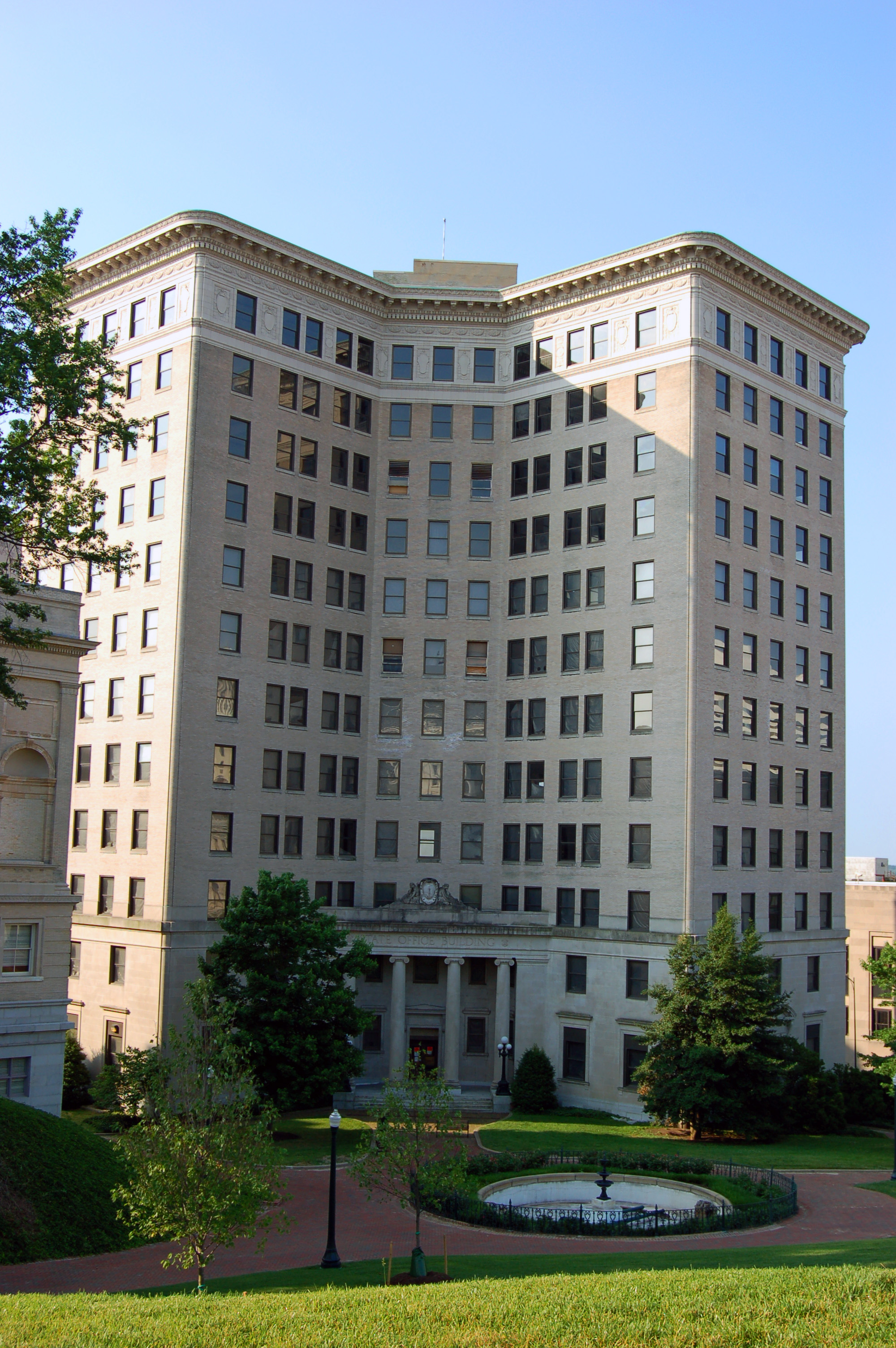
- Washington Building, June 2007

- Location within Virginia Location within the United States
- Location: 1100 Bank St., Richmond, Virginia
- Coordinates: 37°32′15″N 77°26′00″W
- Area: About 1 acre
- Built: 1922-1923
- Built by: Wilson, John T.
- Architect: Carneal, William Leigh Jr.; Johnston, James Markam Ambler; Leguailli, Ferruccio
- Architectural style: Beaux-Arts, Italian Renaissance
- NRHP reference No.: 11000297
- VLR No.: 127-6518

Significant dates
- Added to NRHP: May 18, 2011
- Designated VLR: June 17, 2010

George Washington Building, also known as the Virginia State Office Building, is a historic state office building located in Richmond, Virginia. It was built in 1922–1923, and is a 12-story, steel frame, V-shaped Beaux-Arts style building. The building has a one-story basement, two-story limestone base, nine-story brick shaft, and attic story with a deep cornice that features elaborate terra cotta ornament.

It was listed on the National Register of Historic Places in 2011.
