= Richmond and Chesapeake Bay Railway Car Barn =

- U.S. National Register of Historic Places
- Virginia Landmarks Register
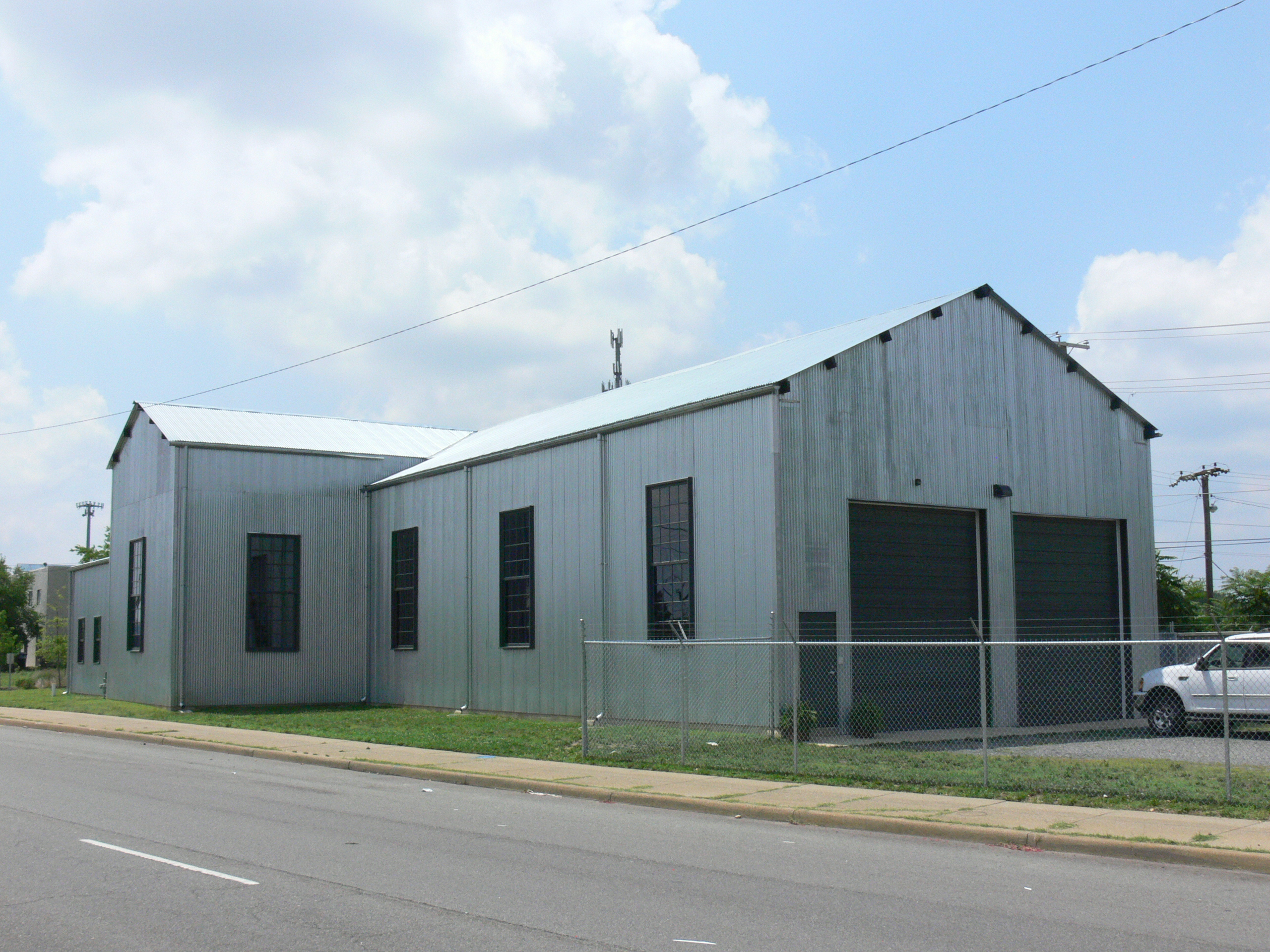
- Richmond and Chesapeake Bay Railway Car Barn, July 2011

- Location within Virginia Location within the United States
- Location: 1620 Brook Rd., Richmond, Virginia
- Coordinates: 37°33′36″N 77°26′48″W
- Area: 1.2 acres (0.49 ha)
- Built: 1907
- NRHP reference No.: 06000349
- VLR No.: 127-6171

Significant dates
- Added to NRHP: May 4, 2006
- Designated VLR: March 8, 2006

Richmond and Chesapeake Bay Railway Car Barn is a historic interurban car barn located in Richmond, Virginia. It was built by the Richmond and Chesapeake Bay Railway in 1907. It is a one-story, gable-roofed, T-plan building with a steel frame clad with corrugated steel panels. A one-story transformer station was added to the east side of the building in the 1920s.

It was listed on the National Register of Historic Places in 2006.
