= Department of Public Utilities Howard (Overbrook) Road Facility =

Historic structure in Virginia, US

- U.S. National Register of Historic Places
- Virginia Landmarks Register
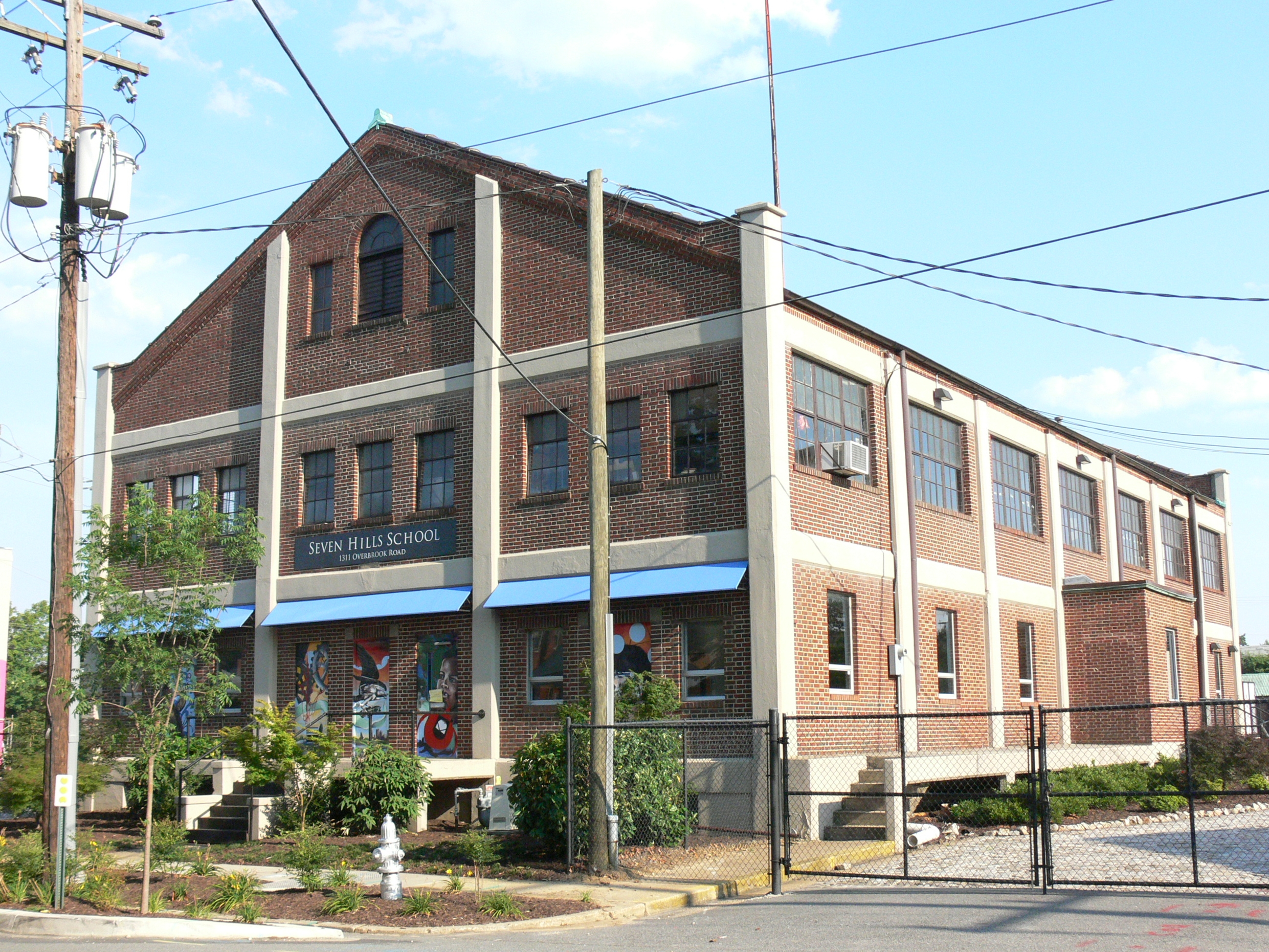
- Department of Public Utilities Howard (Overbrook) Road Facility, July 2011

- Location within Virginia Location within the United States
- Location: 1307, 1311, 1315, 1317, 1319 Overbrook Rd., Richmond, Virginia
- Coordinates: 37°33′55″N 77°27′11″W
- Area: 2.4 acres (0.97 ha)
- Built: 1925
- Architect: Adelstein, Kenneth M.
- Architectural style: Colonial Revival
- NRHP reference No.: 07000767
- VLR No.: 127-6184

Significant dates
- Added to NRHP: July 24, 2007
- Designated VLR: June 6, 2007

Department of Public Utilities Howard (Overbrook) Road Facility is a historic material storage, repair facility and office complex located in Richmond, Virginia. The complex was begun in 1925, and consists of consists of three brick and concrete buildings, a two-story stucco building and a row of metal and brick storage sheds.

It was listed on the National Register of Historic Places in 2007.
