= Springhill Historic District =

Historic district in Virginia, United States

- U.S. National Register of Historic Places
- U.S. Historic district
- Richmond City Historic District
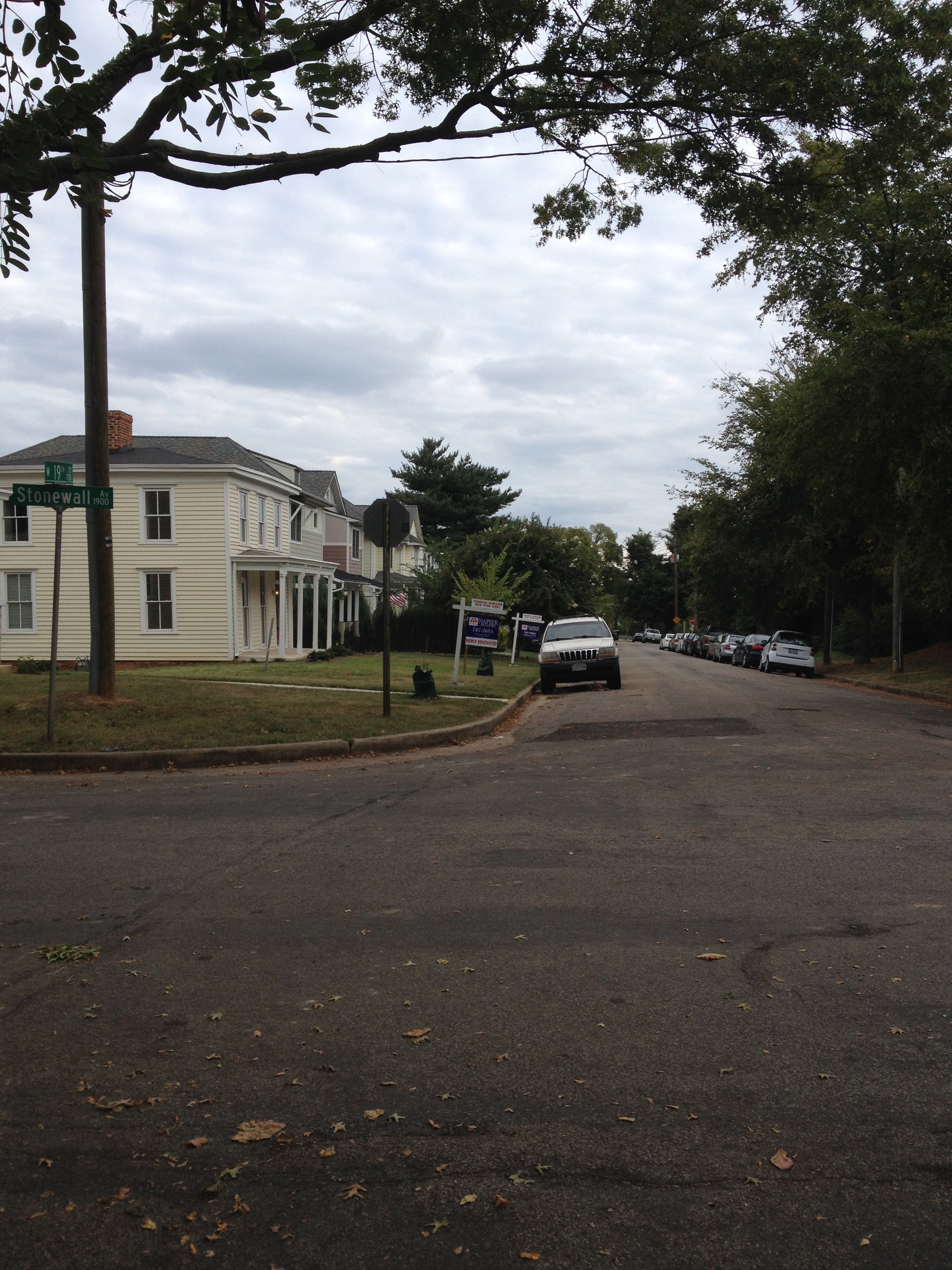

- Location within Virginia Location within the United States
- Location: Roughly W. 19th, W. 20th, W. 21st & W. 22nd Sts., Riverside Dr., Stonewall Ave., Richmond, Virginia
- Coordinates: 37°31′27″N 77°27′17″W
- Area: 36 acres (15 ha)
- Built: 1873
- Architectural style: Colonial Revival; Craftsman/Bungalow
- NRHP reference No.: 13001173
- Added to NRHP: February 10, 2014

The Springhill Historic District is a national historic district encompassing an early-20th century residential neighborhood in Richmond, Virginia. The neighborhood is located on the south side of the James River, just west of Cowardin Avenue and north of Semmes Avenue. It is roughly bounded on the north by Riverside Drive and on the west by Canoe Run Park. Although there was some residential development in this area earlier in the 19th century (as evidenced by the presence of a few Greek Revival houses), and the area was platted out as early as the 1870s, most construction took place in this area during the 1920s, and is in Colonial Revival and Craftsman styles. The district also includes remnants of a 19th-century water supply system, the remains of the Manchester Waterworks, an underground aqueduct, and the remains of a water-control tower.

The district was listed on the National Register of Historic Places in 2014.
