= 2900 Block Grove Avenue Historic District =

Historic district in Virginia, United States

- U.S. National Register of Historic Places
- U.S. Historic district
- Virginia Landmarks Register
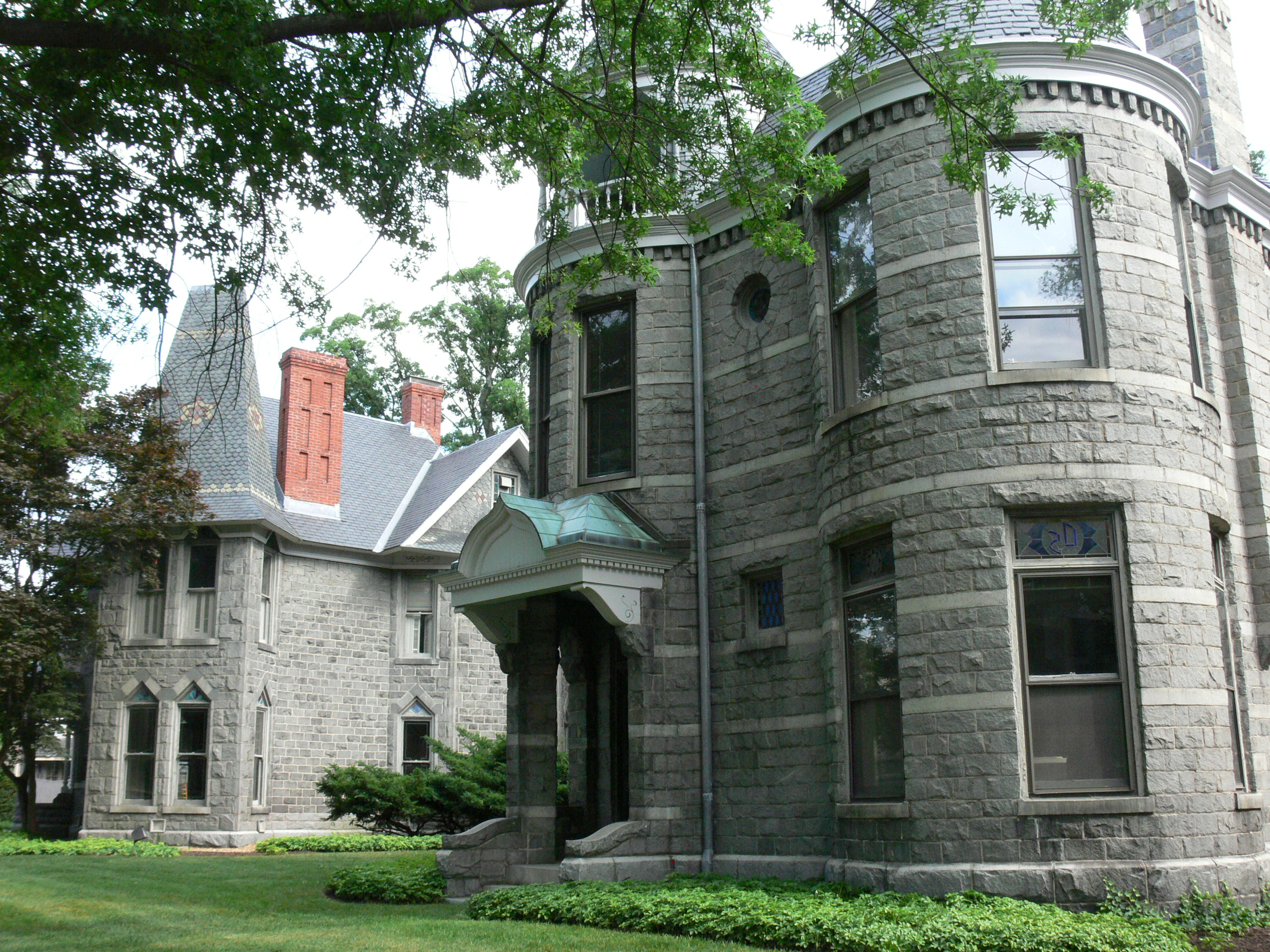
- 2900 Block Grove Avenue, May 2011

- Location within Virginia Location within the United States
- Location: 2901, 2905, 2911, and 2915 Grove Ave., Richmond, Virginia
- Coordinates: 37°33′20″N 77°28′36″W
- Area: 9.9 acres (4.0 ha)
- Built: 1898
- Built by: West End Improvement Co.
- Architectural style: Queen Anne, Mission/spanish Revival
- NRHP reference No.: 73002223
- VLR No.: 127-0238

Significant dates
- Added to NRHP: February 20, 1973
- Designated VLR: October 17, 1972

The 2900 Block Grove Avenue Historic District is a national historic district located at Richmond, Virginia. The district encompasses five contributing buildings including three Queen Anne style houses and a square house with Mission/Spanish Revival decorative details. The houses were built between the late-1890s and 1912. Also included is a row of wooden carriage houses with cupolas and gingerbread scroll work.

It was added to the National Register of Historic Places in 1973.
