= Branch Building =

Historic commercial building in Virginia, United States

- U.S. National Register of Historic Places
- Virginia Landmarks Register
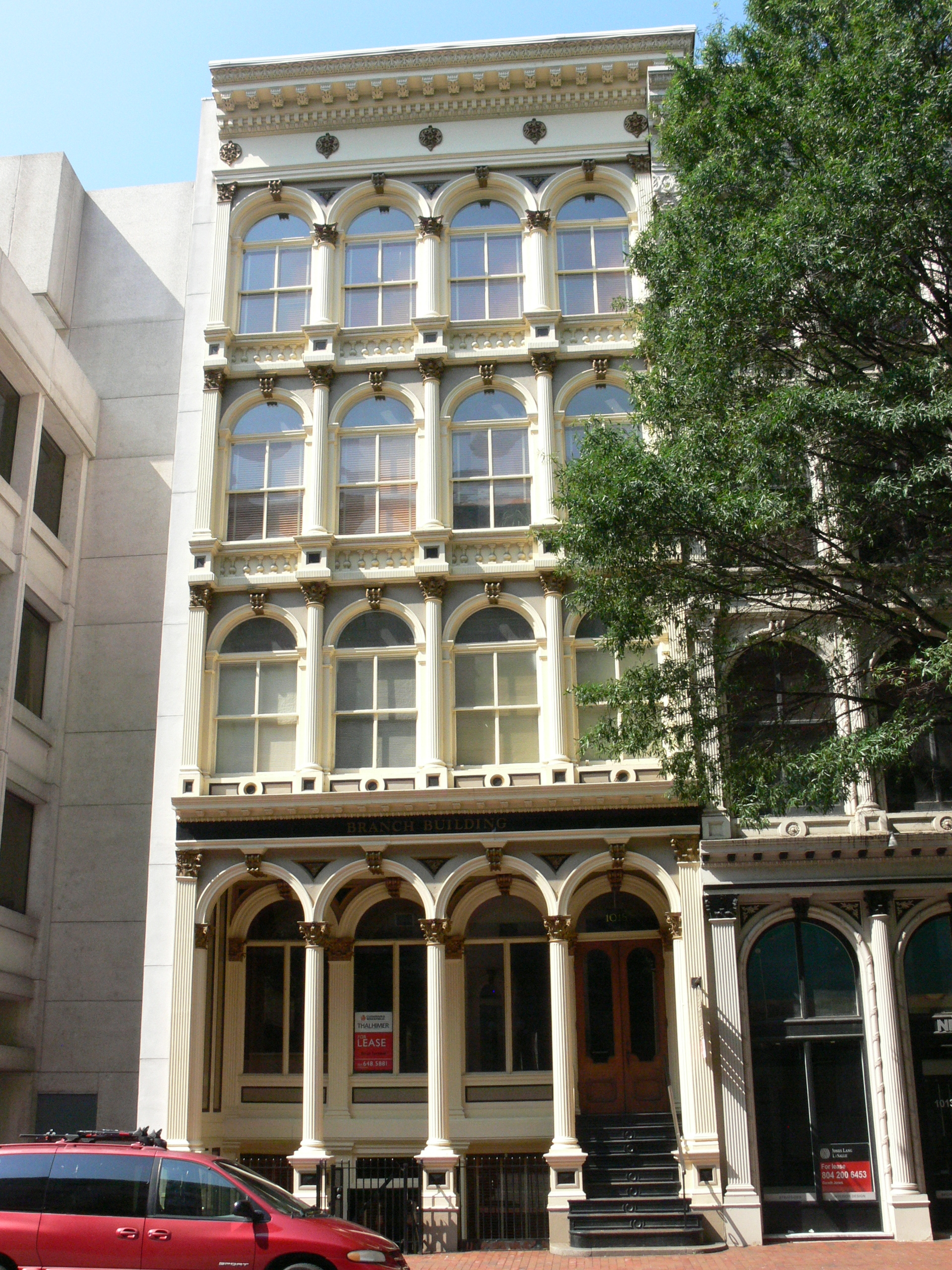
- Branch Building, July 2011

- Location within Virginia Location within the United States
- Location: 1015 E. Main St., Richmond, Virginia
- Coordinates: 37°32′14″N 77°26′8″W
- Area: 0.3 acres (0.12 ha)
- Built: c. 1886
- NRHP reference No.: 70000878
- VLR No.: 127-0196

Significant dates
- Added to NRHP: April 17, 1970
- Designated VLR: December 2, 1969

Branch Building, also known as the Virginia Fire and Marine Insurance Company, is a historic commercial building located in Richmond, Virginia. It was built about 1886, and is a four-story, four-bay, brick building with a cast iron front. The building measures 26 feet wide by 140 feet deep.

It was listed on the National Register of Historic Places in 1970.
