= Moore's Auto Body and Paint Shop =

- U.S. National Register of Historic Places
- Virginia Landmarks Register
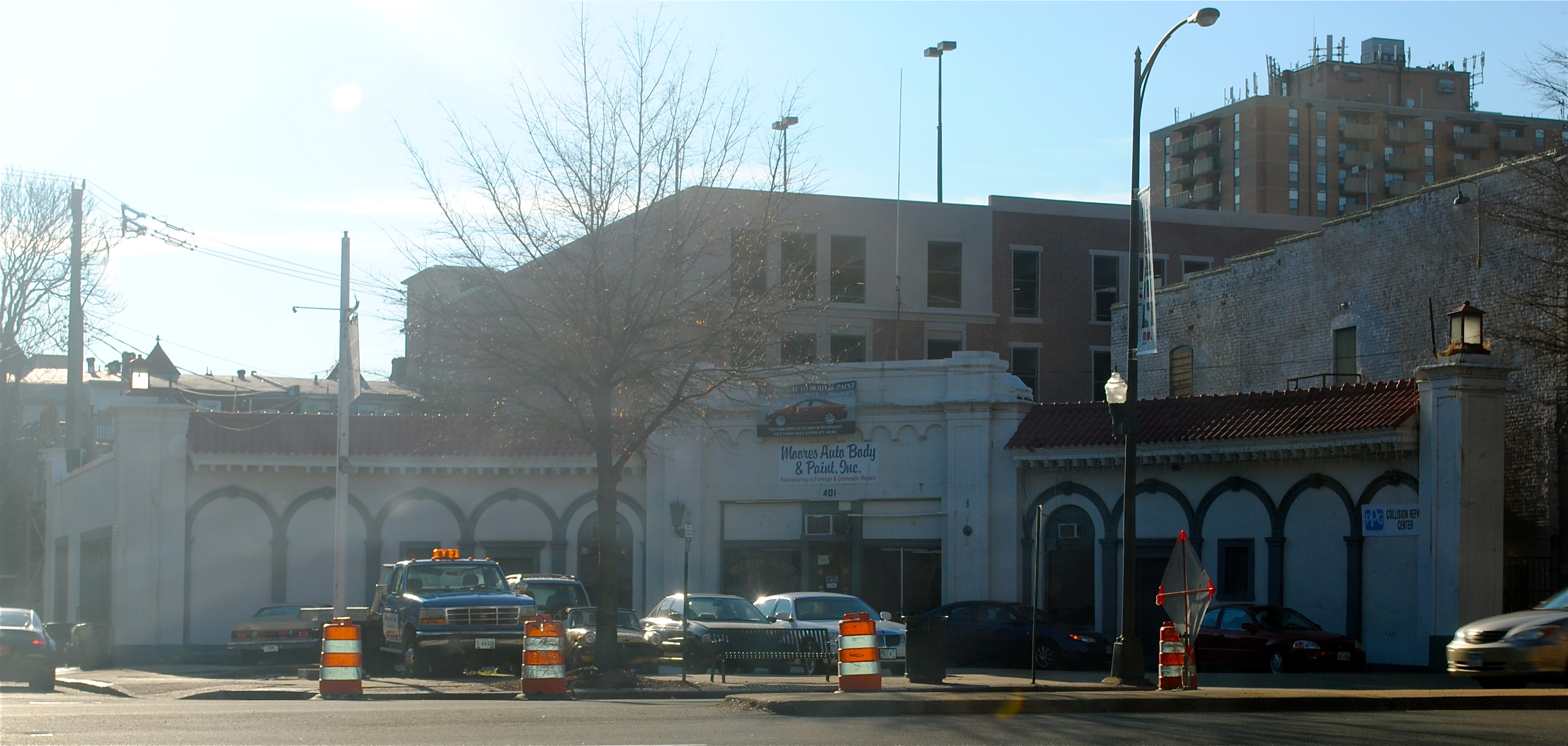
- Moore's Auto Body and Paint Shop, December 2011

- Location within Virginia Location within the United States
- Location: 401 W Broad St., Richmond, Virginia
- Coordinates: 37°32′51″N 77°26′46″W
- Area: less than one acre
- Built: 1875, 1926
- Architect: Lee, Smith, and VanderVoort
- Architectural style: Mission/spanish Revival
- NRHP reference No.: 93001123
- VLR No.: 127-0834

Significant dates
- Added to NRHP: October 14, 1993
- Designated VLR: August 18, 1993

Moore's Auto Body and Paint Shop, formerly known as Standard Gas and Oil Supply Station, is a historic filling station located in Richmond, Virginia. The oldest section was originally built as a stable in 1875. The station was enlarged in 1926. It is a one-story, stuccoed brick building in the Spanish Colonial Revival style. The structure has an irregular plan, with the northern facade formed in a crescent shape and the rest of the building in rectangular forms. The central section features heavy paneled stuccoed pilasters connected by a corbeled brick table and a paneled parapet. The building was used as a filling station until 1936, after which it was occupied by a series of automobile repair businesses.

It was listed on the National Register of Historic Places in 1994.
