= Donnan–Asher Iron-front Building =

Historic commercial building in Virginia, United States

- U.S. National Register of Historic Places
- Virginia Landmarks Register
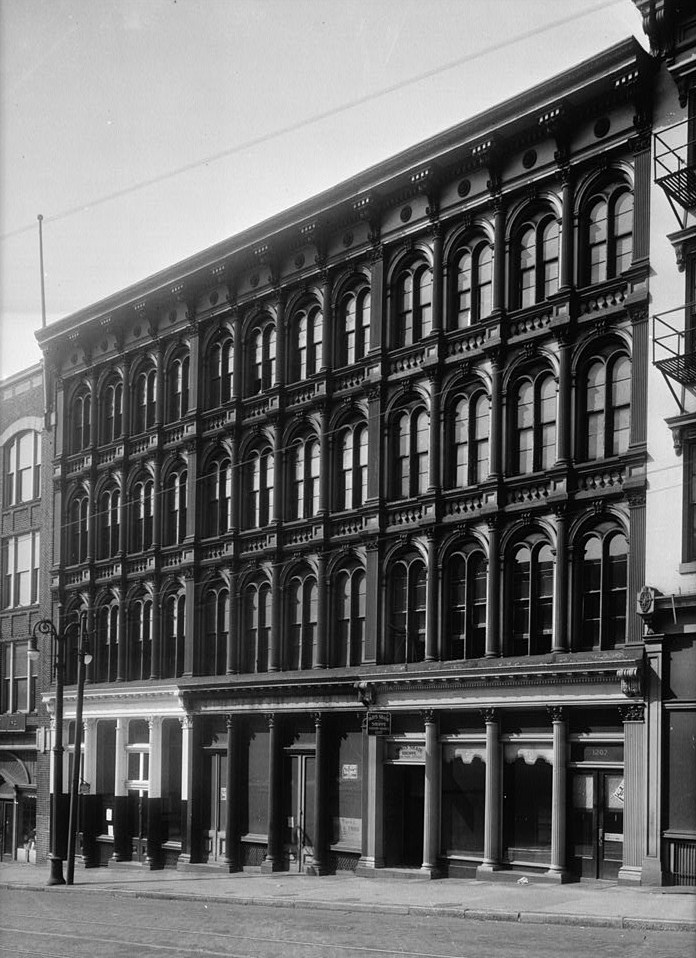
- Donnan–Asher Iron-front Building, HABS Photo

- Location within Virginia Location within the United States
- Location: 1207-1211 E. Main St., Richmond, Virginia
- Coordinates: 37°32′10″N 77°26′2″W
- Area: 0.3 acres (0.12 ha)
- Built: 1866
- Built by: Donnan, William S.; Asher, John
- Architectural style: Italianate
- NRHP reference No.: 70000879
- VLR No.: 127-0163

Significant dates
- Added to NRHP: February 26, 1970
- Designated VLR: December 2, 1969

Donnan–Asher Iron-front Building is a historic commercial building located in Richmond, Virginia. It was built in 1866, and is a four-story, 12 bay, Italianate style brick building with a cast iron front.

It was listed on the National Register of Historic Places in 1970.
