= Planters National Bank =

Historic commercial building in Virginia, United States

- U.S. National Register of Historic Places
- Virginia Landmarks Register
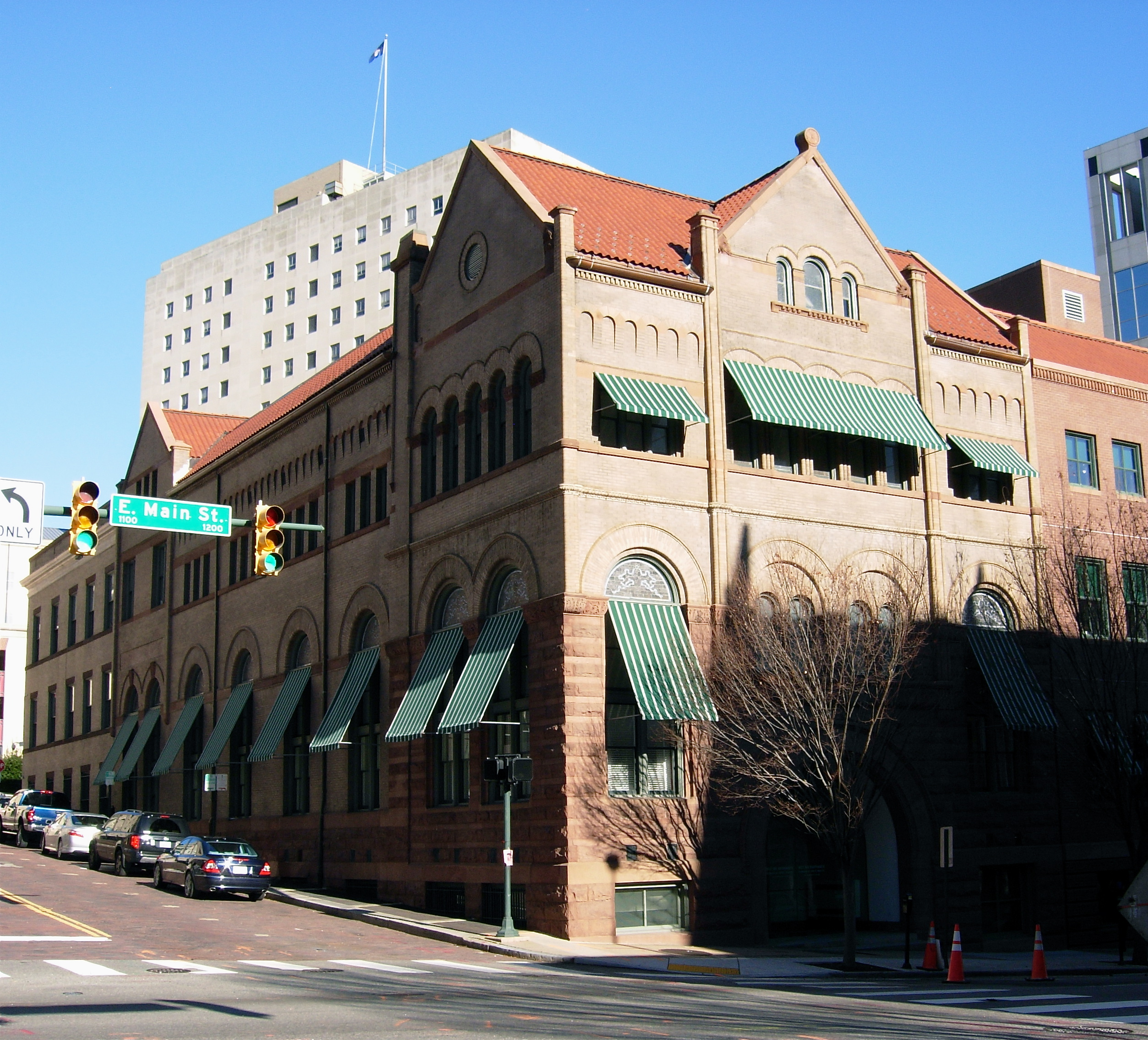
- Planters National Bank, January 2012

- Location within Virginia Location within the United States
- Location: 12th and E. Main Sts., Richmond, Virginia
- Coordinates: 37°32′11″N 77°26′2″W
- Area: less than one acre
- Built: 1893
- Architect: Read, Charles H. Jr.
- Architectural style: Romanesque, Richardsonian Romanesque
- NRHP reference No.: 83003306
- VLR No.: 127-0150

Significant dates
- Added to NRHP: February 10, 1983
- Designated VLR: February 15, 1977

Planters National Bank, also known as the Old Planters Bank, is a historic bank building located in Richmond, Virginia. It was built in 1893, and is a 2 1/2-story, three-bay, Richardsonian Romanesque style brownstone building. It has an "I"-plan with three intersecting gable roofs. It features rusticated and elaborately carved facades, a picturesque roof line, and stoned-arched entryway.

It was listed on the National Register of Historic Places in 1983.
