= Taylor Farm (Richmond, Virginia) =

- U.S. National Register of Historic Places
- Virginia Landmarks Register
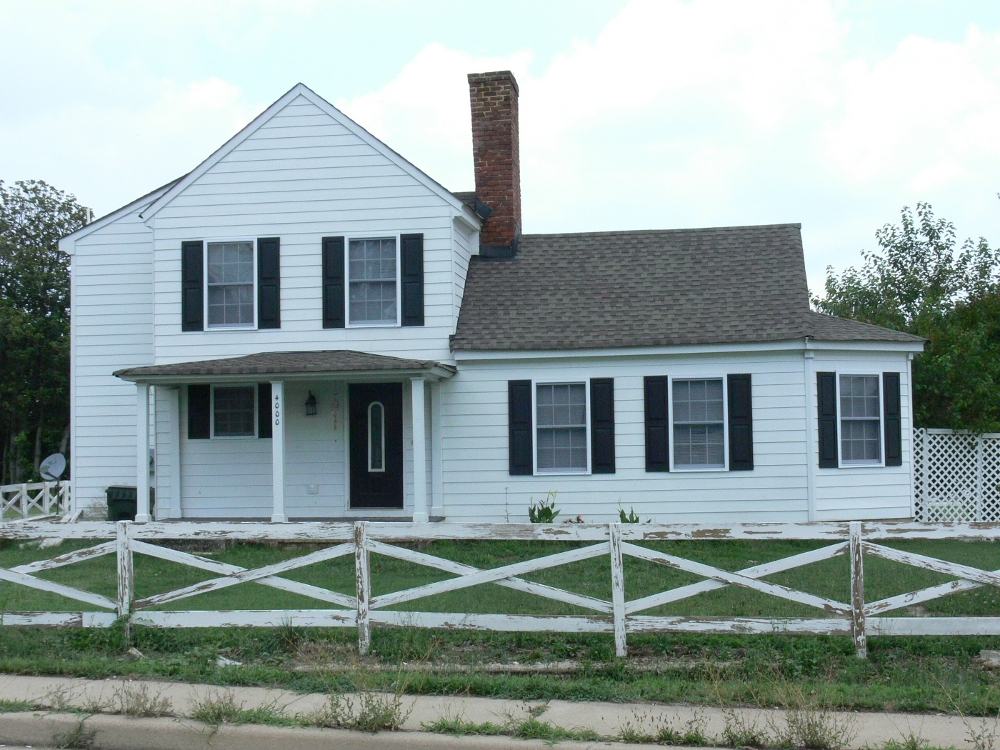
- Taylor Farm House, July 2011

- Location within Virginia Location within the United States
- Location: 4012 Walmsley Blvd., Richmond, Virginia
- Coordinates: 37°28′20″N 77°28′12″W
- Area: 3.5 acres (1.4 ha)
- Built: 1870
- Built by: Taylor, Olin
- Architectural style: Bungalow/craftsman
- NRHP reference No.: 90002158
- VLR No.: 127-0677

Significant dates
- Added to NRHP: January 24, 1991
- Designated VLR: June 19, 1990

Taylor Farm is a historic farm complex located in Richmond, Virginia. The complex consists of a well-preserved group of buildings and landscape elements ranging in date from the 1870s to the 1930s. they include a small two-story frame main house, a handsome American Craftsman-style garage, a storage shed, a barn, a corncrib, a lumber shed, and a poultry house.

It was added to the National Register of Historic Places in 1991.
