= Pace–King House =

Historic house in Virginia, United States

- U.S. National Register of Historic Places
- Virginia Landmarks Register
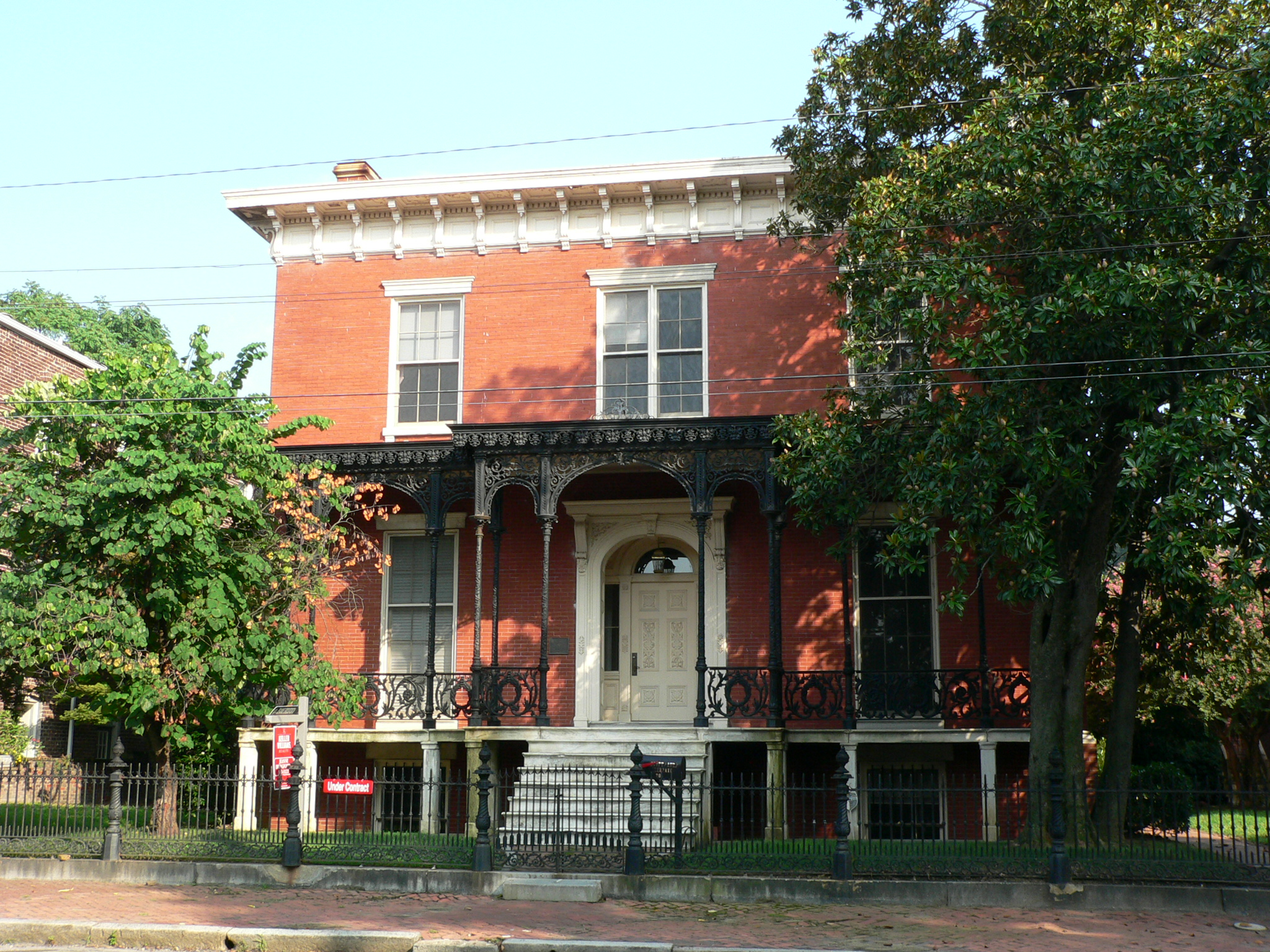
- Pace–King House, August 2005

- Location within Virginia Location within the United States
- Location: 205 N. 19th St., Richmond, Virginia
- Coordinates: 37°32′3″N 77°25′30″W
- Area: less than one acre
- Built: 1860
- Architectural style: Italianate
- NRHP reference No.: 76002230
- VLR No.: 127-0229

Significant dates
- Added to NRHP: July 30, 1976
- Designated VLR: April 20, 1976

The Pace–King House, also known as the Charles Hill House, is a historic home located in Richmond, Virginia. It was built in 1860, and is a large two-story, three-bay, Italianate style brick dwelling. It has a shallow hipped roof with a richly detailed bracketed cornice and four exterior end chimneys. It features a one-story, cast-iron porch, composed of a wide center arch with narrow flanking arches, all supported on slender foliated columns. Also on the property are a contributing brick, two-story servants' house fronted by a two-level gallery and a brick structure which incorporates the original kitchen and stable outbuildings.

It was listed on the National Register of Historic Places in 1974.
