= Putney Houses =

Historic houses in Virginia, United States

- U.S. National Register of Historic Places
- Virginia Landmarks Register
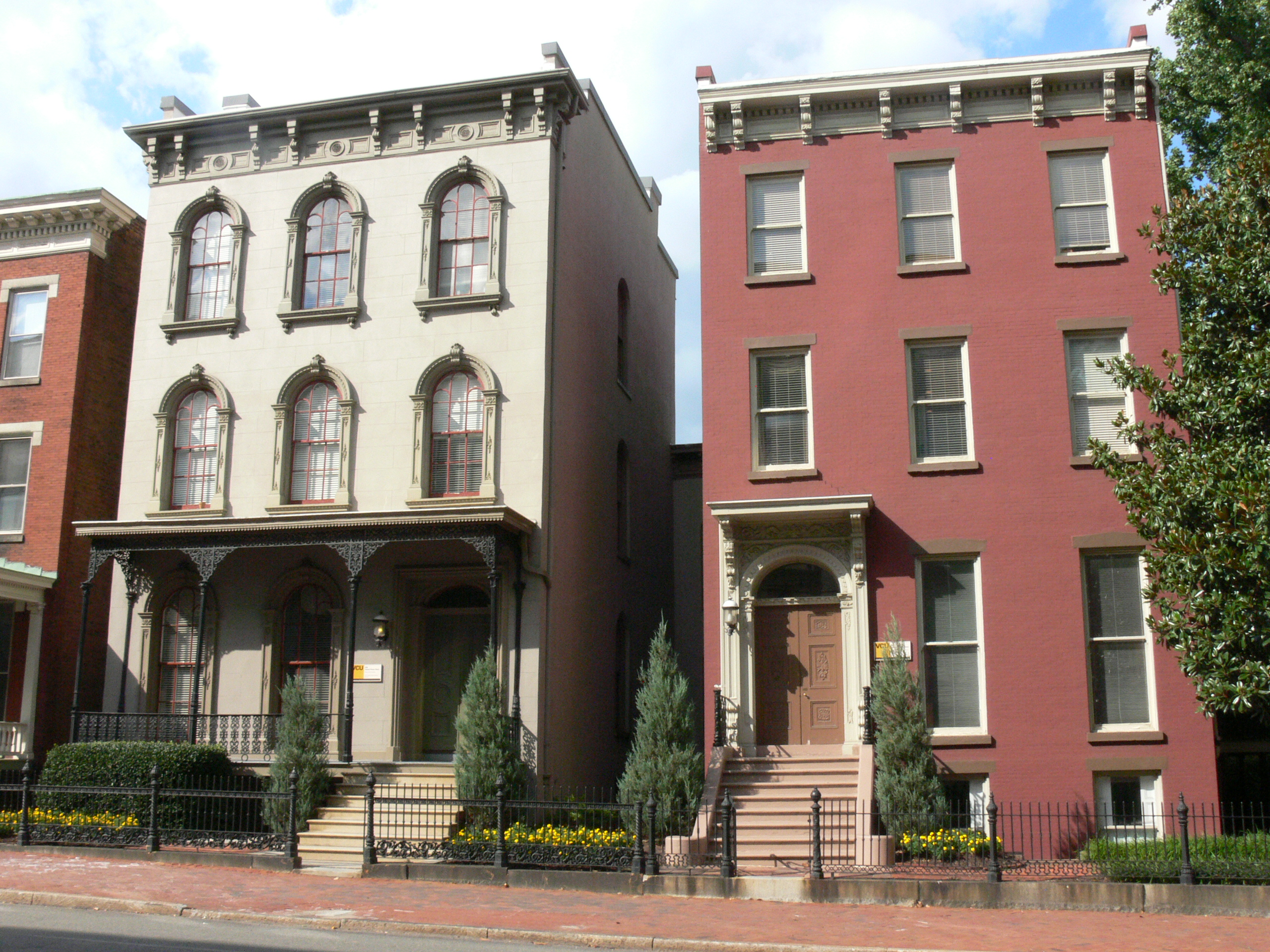
- Putney Houses, July 2011

- Location within Virginia Location within the United States
- Location: 1010-1012 E. Marshall St., Richmond, Virginia
- Coordinates: 37°32′27″N 77°25′53″W
- Area: 0.1 acres (0.040 ha)
- Built: 1859
- Architectural style: Italianate
- NRHP reference No.: 69000355
- VLR No.: 127-0085

Significant dates
- Added to NRHP: June 11, 1969
- Designated VLR: November 5, 1968

Putney Houses are a set of two historic homes located in Richmond, Virginia. The Samuel Putney House at 1010 E. Marshall Street is a three-story, three bay Italianate style townhouse with rich architectural decoration. It features a delicate cast iron, one-story porch across the first story. The neighboring Stephen Putney House at 1012 E. Marshall Street is a three-story, three-bay stuccoed brick dwelling crowned by a bracketed cornice. It features a magnificent two-story verandah of ornamental iron on the east side. Both Putney Houses were built in 1859, and have extensive rear ells. The ornamental ironwork is a product of the local Phoenix Iron Works.

It was listed on the National Register of Historic Places in 1969.
