= John Rolfe Apartments =

Historic apartment building in Virginia, US

- U.S. National Register of Historic Places
- Virginia Landmarks Register
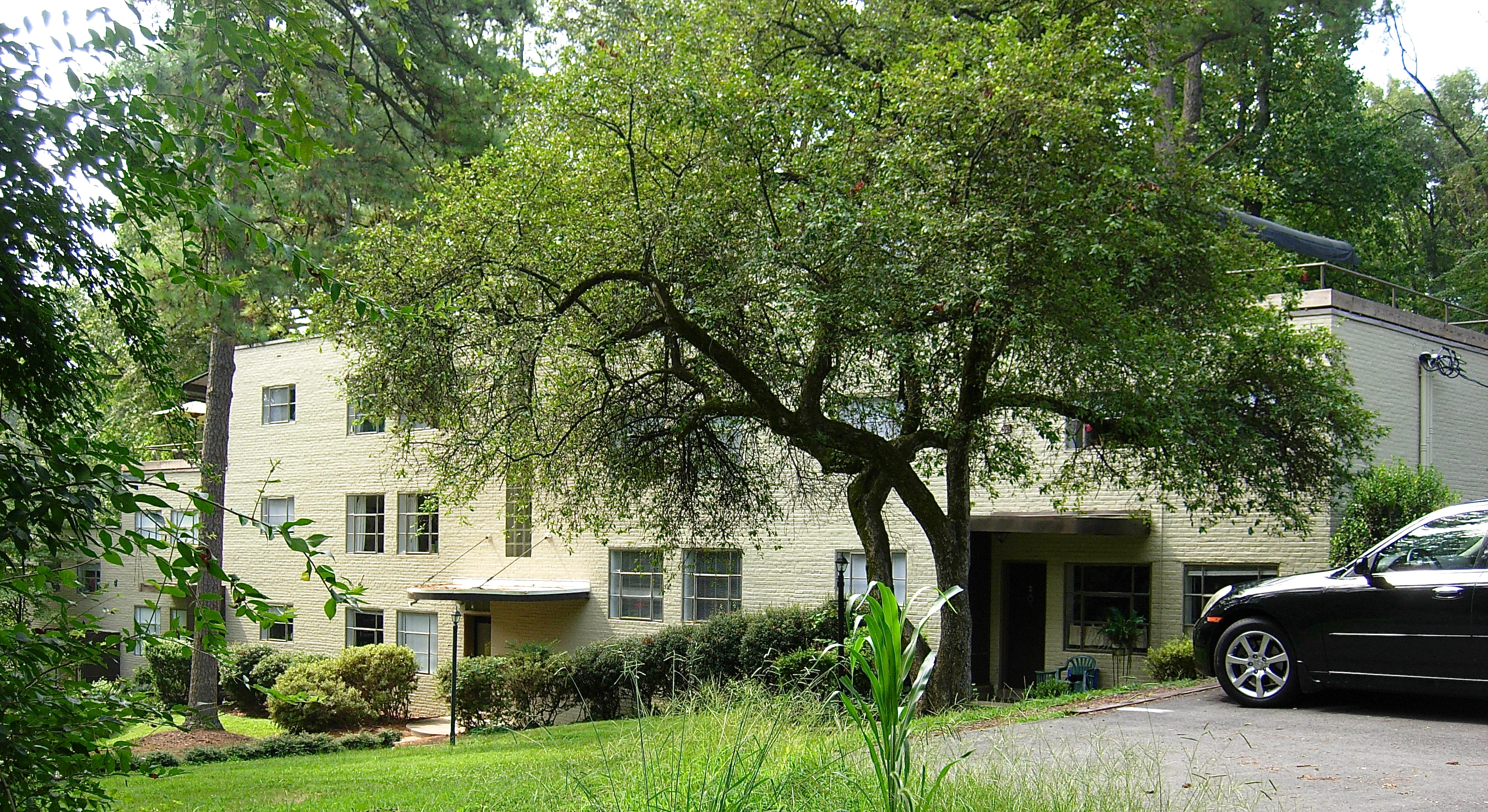
- John Rolfe Apartments, August 2012

- Location within Virginia Location within the United States
- Location: 101 Tempsford Lane, Richmond, Virginia
- Coordinates: 37°33′59″N 77°31′11″W
- Area: 0.887 acres (0.359 ha)
- Built: 1940
- Architect: George E. Hoppe, Jr.
- Architectural style: International
- NRHP reference No.: 10000736
- VLR No.: 127-6513

Significant dates
- Added to NRHP: September 9, 2010
- Designated VLR: June 17, 2010

John Rolfe Apartments is a historic apartment building located in Richmond, Virginia. The building was built in 1940, and is a two and three-story, ten-unit, International style brick building. The rectangular building has concrete copings at the edges of the staggered flat roofs. The building's sloped setting is park-like with a heavy buffer of trees to the south and an open lawn and trees along the north property line. The building is considered a rare and early example of International Style residential architecture in the city of Richmond and the region.

It was listed on the National Register of Historic Places in 2010.
