= Charles Robinson =

Charles, Charlie or Charley Robinson may refer to:

== In arts and entertainment ==
- Charles Dorman Robinson (1847–1933), American painter
- Charles Napier Robinson (1849–1936), English journalist and story writer
- Charles M. Robinson (architect) (1867–1932), American architect
- Charles Mulford Robinson (1869–1917), American journalist
- Charles Robinson (illustrator) (1870–1937), British book illustrator
- Charles Knox Robinson (1932–2006), American actor
- Charlie Robinson (actor) (1945–2021), American actor
- Charles M. Robinson III (1949–2012), American author and illustrator
- Charles M. Robinson (video director) (born 1984), American video director
- Chaz Robinson (singer) (Charles Leon Robinson II, born 1989), American singer and songwriter

== In government, military, and politics ==
- Charles Robinson (MP) (c. 1732 – 1807), English politician; MP for Canterbury
- Charles L. Robinson (1818–1894), American politician; first governor of Kansas
- Charles D. Robinson (1822–1886), American politician; third Secretary of State of Wisconsin
- Charles Robinson Jr. (1829–1891), American politician; mayor of Charlestown, Massachusetts
- Charles Robinson (Canadian politician) (1835–1898), physician and politician in Ontario
- Charles Robinson (Medal of Honor) (1840–1896), American Civil War sailor and Medal of Honor recipient
- Charles Robinson (RAF airman) (1897–1961), English flying ace in World War I
- Charles W. Robinson (1919–2014), American entrepreneur
- Charles Robinson (Arkansas politician) (born 1946), American politician; Arkansas State Treasurer
- Charles Gepp Robinson, Royal Navy officer and hydrographic surveyor
- Charles Walker Robinson, Canadian soldier and author
- Charles Grey Robinson (1850–1934), admiral in the Royal Navy.

== In science and academia ==
- Charles Robinson (priest) (1826–1909), English academic at Cambridge University
- Charles Seymour Robinson (1829–1899), American pastor and editor and compiler of hymns
- Charles Budd Robinson (1871–1913), Canadian botanist
- Charles Alexander Robinson Jr. (1900–1965), American classical scholar

== In sport ==
- Charlie Robinson (baseball) (1856–1913), American baseball player
- Charles Robinson (Australian cricketer) (1879–1951), Australian cricketer
- Charles Robinson (New Zealand cricketer) (1892–1947), cricketer for New Zealand
- Charlie Robinson (footballer) (1907–1990), English footballer, for Gillingham and Rochdale
- Charles Robinson (referee) (born 1964), American professional wrestling referee
- Lefty Robinson (1891–1974), American Negro Leagues baseball player
- Charley Robinson (1925–2007), American football player
- Chuckie Robinson (Charles Robinson III, born 1994), American baseball catcher

== In other fields ==
- Charles Scott Robinson, American criminal sentenced in 1994, and release date due for November 11, 7987

== See also ==
- Charles Robison (disambiguation)
- Chaz Robinson (disambiguation)
- Nick Cuti, cartoonist and screenwriter who sometimes used the pseudonym "Chuck Robinson"
