= Chaz Robinson =

Chaz Robinson may refer to:

- Chaz Robinson (American football)
- Chaz Robinson (singer)

== See also ==
- Charles Robinson (disambiguation)
