= Charles M. Robinson (architect) =

American architect (1867–1932)

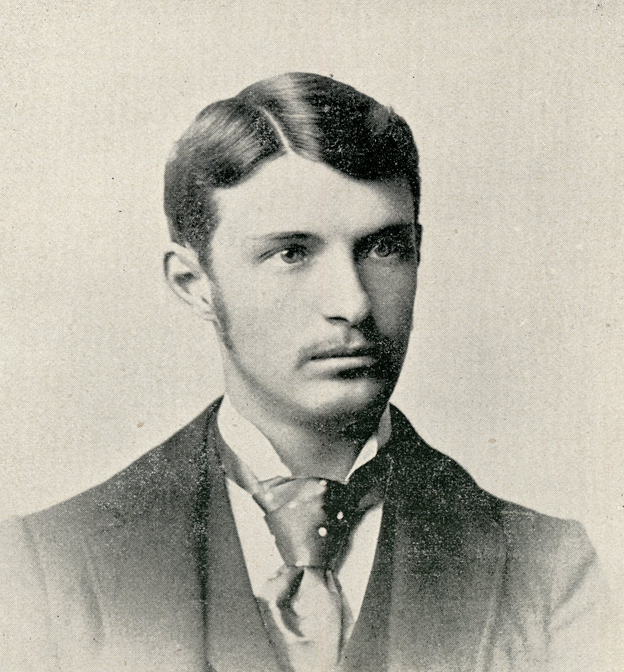
- Born: March 3, 1867; Hamilton, Virginia, U.S.
- Died: August 20, 1932 (aged 65); Norfolk, Virginia, U.S.
- Resting place: Hollywood Cemetery; Richmond, Virginia, U.S.
- Occupation: Architect
- Spouse: Annie Custer (m. 1891)
- Children: 2
- Buildings: Newport News Public Library, Thomas Jefferson High School
- Projects: Master plans for James Madison University and Radford University

Charles Morrison Robinson (March 3, 1867 – August 20, 1932), most commonly known as Charles M. Robinson, was an American architect. He worked in Altoona and Pittsburgh, Pennsylvania from 1889 to 1906 and in Richmond, Virginia from 1906 until his death in 1932. He is most remembered as a prolific designer of educational buildings in Virginia, including public schools in Richmond and throughout Virginia, and university buildings for James Madison University, College of William and Mary, Radford University, Virginia State University, University of Mary Washington, and the University of Richmond. He was also the public school architect of the Richmond Public Schools from 1910 to 1929. Many of his works have been listed on the National Register of Historic Places.

== Early years ==
Charles Morrison Robinson was born in Hamilton, Virginia in Loudoun County, the son of Elizabeth (née Crockett) and James Turner Robinson. His father was an architect. He moved to Canada at a young age and was educated in Canadian public schools. He apprenticed with David S. Hopkins (1834–1918), of Grand Rapids, Michigan, and John K. Peebles (1866–1934), of Richmond, Virginia. In 1889, Robinson formed the architectural firm of Smith & Robinson with G. T. Smith in Altoona, Pennsylvania. In 1891, Robinson married Altoona native, Annie Custer (1868–1946). They had two children, Charles Custer Robinson (1892–1963) and Miriam Robinson (1895–1911). At the time of the 1900 United States census, Robinson was living at 1910 West Chestnut Avenue in Altoona. He had two live-in servants, Bridget Sheehan and Mattie Jones, at that time. In 1901, Robinson moved his architectural practice from Altoona to Pittsburgh, Pennsylvania.

== Richmond years ==
In 1906, Robinson moved his practice and family to Richmond, Virginia. He served as the supervising architect for the Richmond Public Schools from 1910 to 1929. He remained in Richmond for the remainder of his professional career. At the time of the 1910 United States census, Robinson was living at 828 Park Avenue in Richmond with his wife, Annie C. Robinson, their two children, and his parents. He also had a live-in servant, Etta Scruggs, and a live-in butler, Fred W. Smith.

At the time of the 1920 United States census, Robinson was living in Richmond with his wife and his mother.

In the early 1930s, Robinson's health began failing. He was hospitalized in Norfolk, Virginia, in August 1932 and died there following an operation. He was buried in Hollywood Cemetery in Richmond.

== Legacy ==
A number of his buildings survive and are listed on the U.S. National Register of Historic Places. In 2006, The Virginian-Pilot called him one of "Virginia's most prolific architects." Mimi Sadler, a historic architect in Richmond, noted at the time that Robinson not only "cranked out a lot of school buildings, but they were all high quality and many have become landmarks."

== Selected works ==
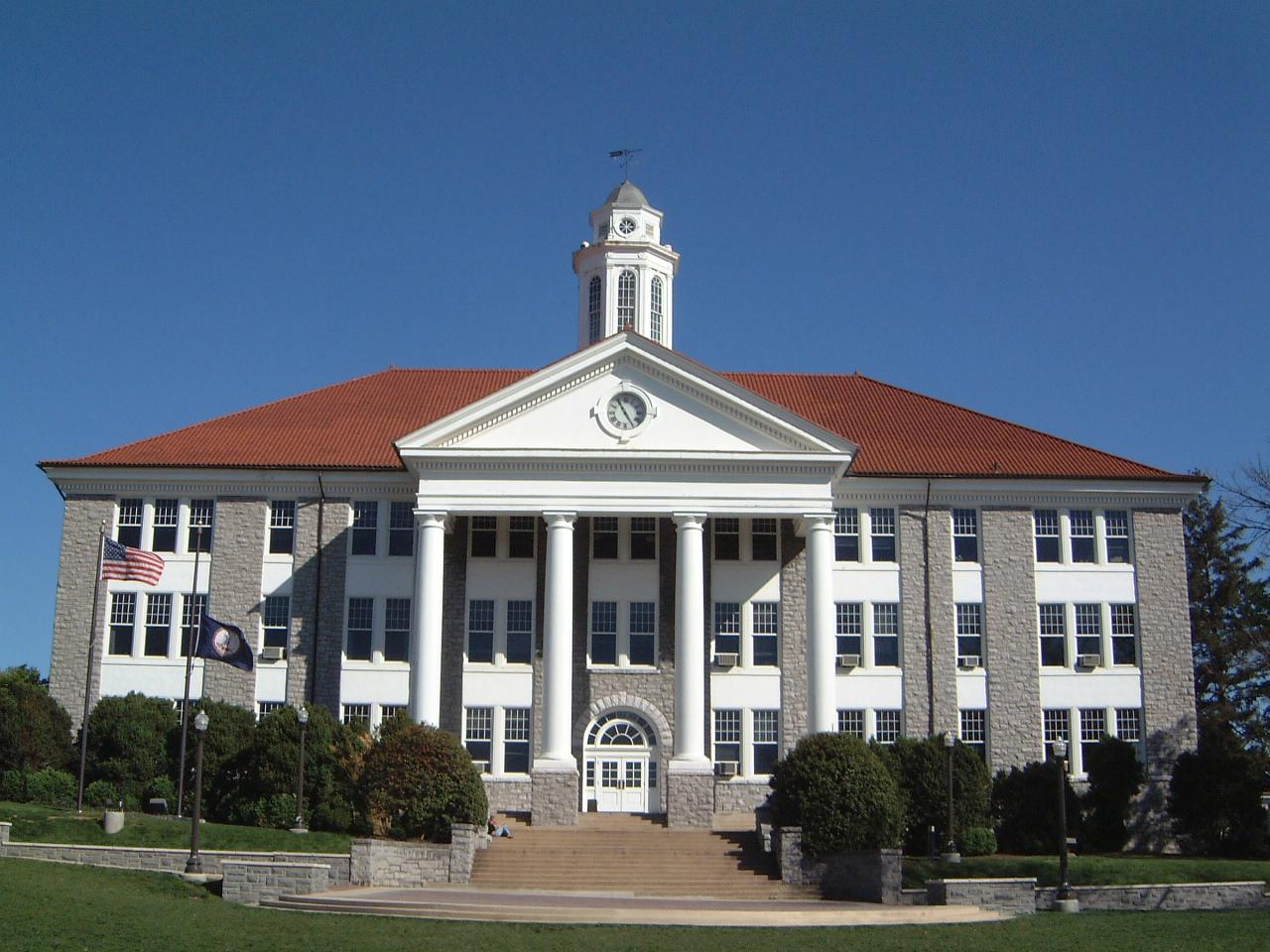
Robinson's Wilson Hall at James Madison University.

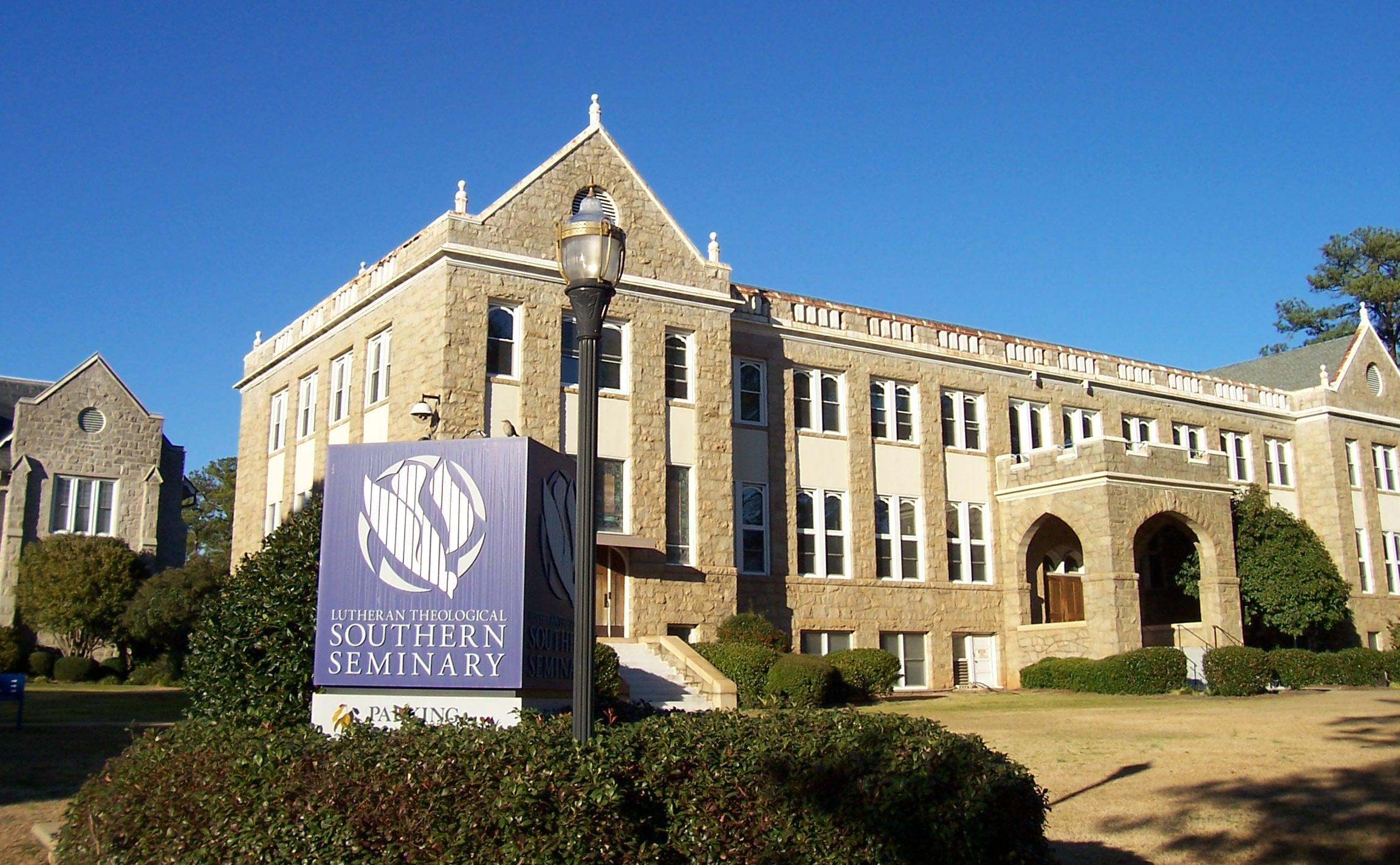
Beam Hall at Lutheran Theological Southern Seminary.

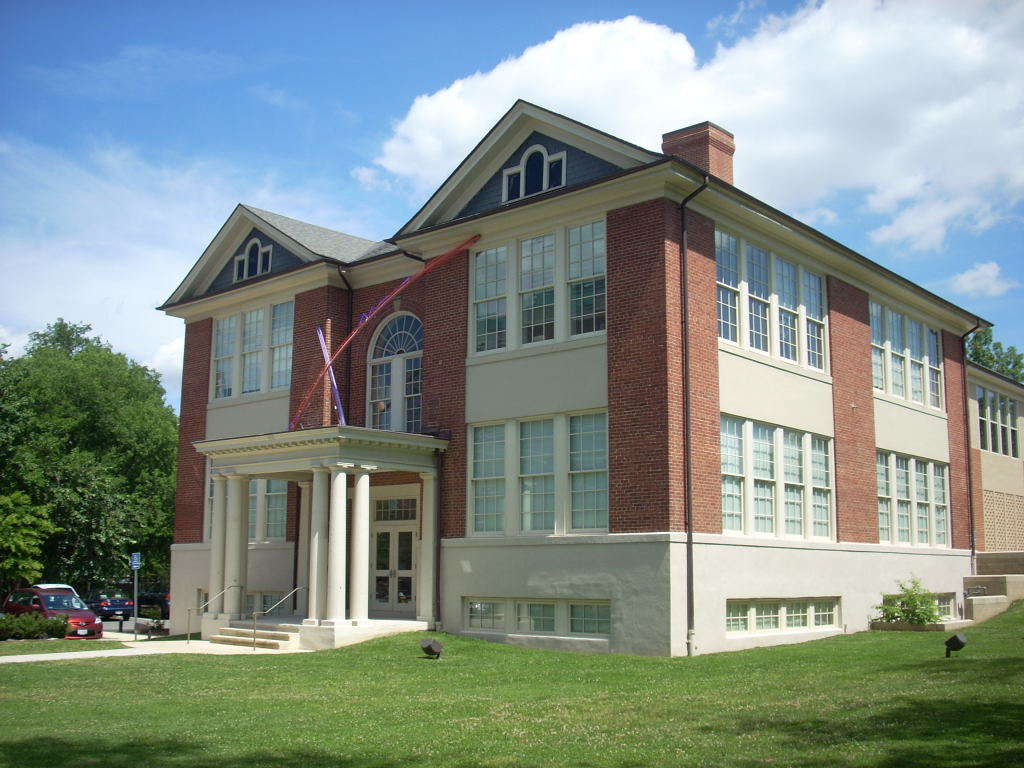
Clarendon School, now maintained by the Arlington Arts Center, in Arlington, Virginia.

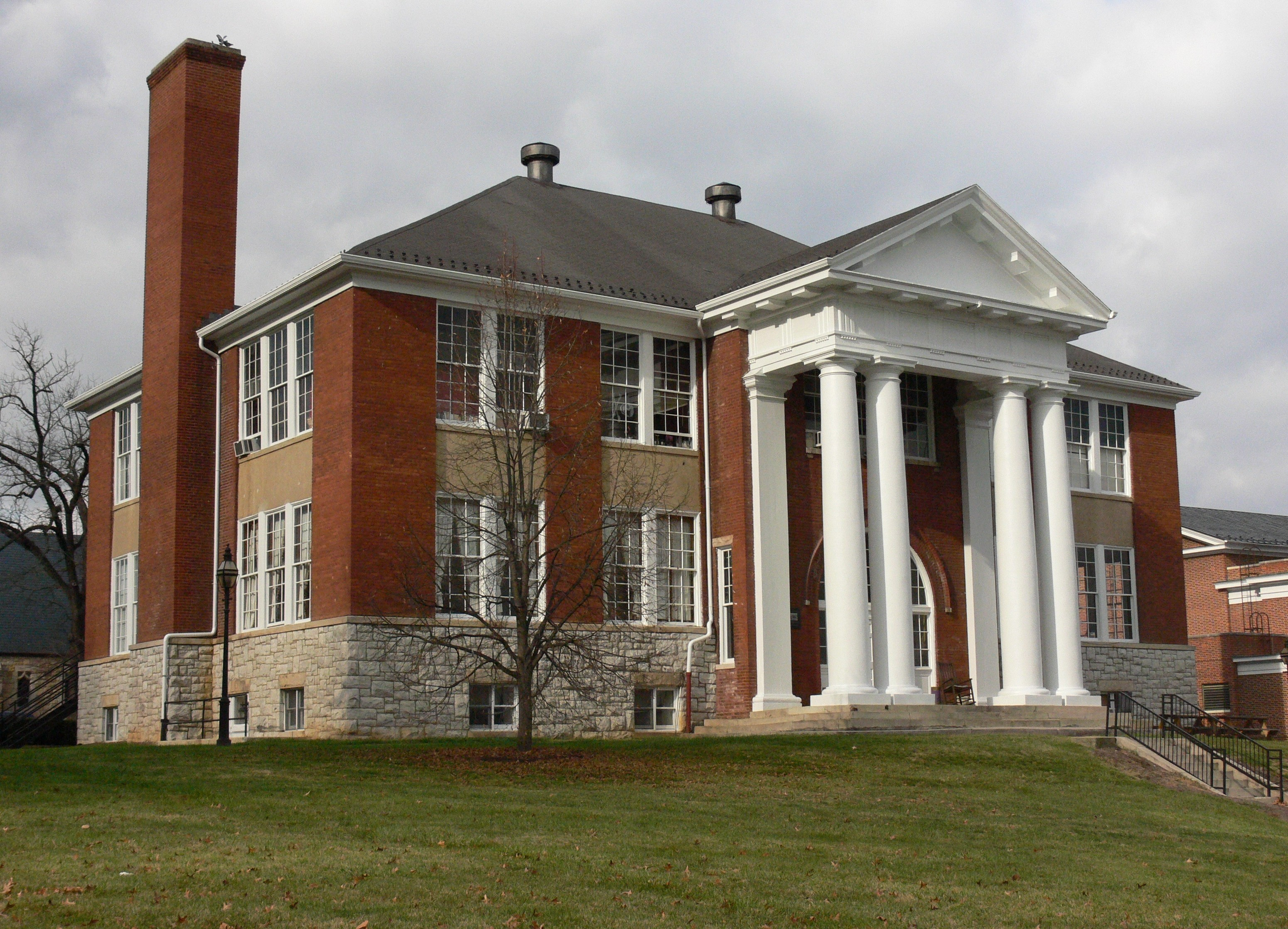
Old Lexington High School, built 1908, designed by Robinson

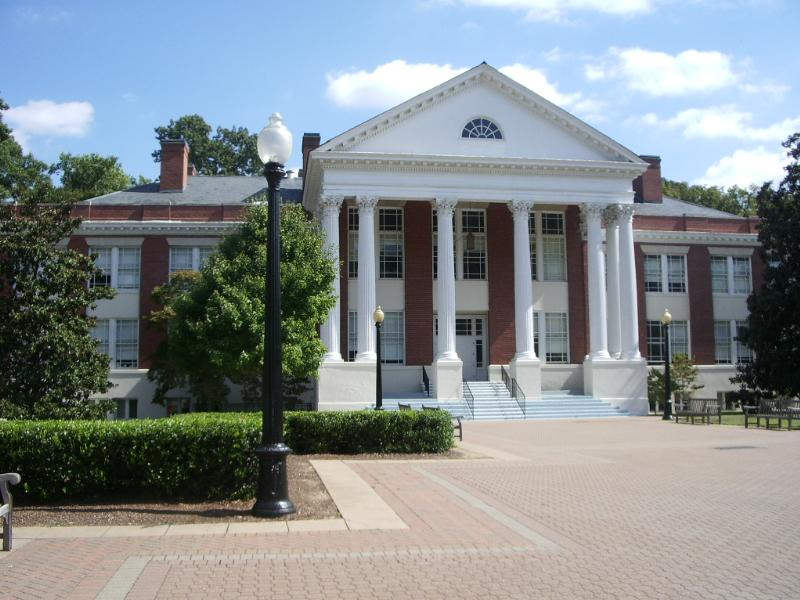
Robinson's Monroe Hall at University of Mary Washington.

Robinson's works include:

=== College and university buildings ===
- The master plan and multiple structures at James Madison University, originally known as the State Normal and Industrial School for Women, from 1908 to 1928, including Maury Hall (1908), Jackson Hall (1908), Harrison Hall (1912), President's House (1913), Spottswood Hall (1915), Alumnae Hall (1922), Sheldon Hall (1922), Gymnasium (1926), Johnson Hall (1928), and Wilson Hall (1930).
- More than 20 buildings at Virginia State College (a historically black college now known as Virginia State University), in Petersburg, Virginia, between 1918 and 1930, including Eggleston Hall (1926), Seward Hall (1926), Trinkle Hall (1928), Byrd Hall (1928), and the Agricultural Building (1930).
- More than 60 works as the College Architect for the College of William and Mary from 1921 to 1931, including Jefferson Hall (1920), the George Preston Blow Gymnasium (1923), Monroe Hall (1923), Old Dominion Hall (1926), Rogers Memorial Science Hall (1926), Kate Waller Barrett Hall (1926), Lake Matoaka Cottage (1927), Kappa Kappa Gamma (1927), Delta Delta (1927), Moncure Cottage (1928), Washington Hall (1928), Brown Hall (1930), Alpha Chi Omega (1929), Kappa Delta (1929), Phi Beta Phi (1929), Chandler Hall (1930), Delta Delta Delta (1931), Chi Omega (1931).
- University of Mary Washington: President's Residence (1910), Frances Willard Hall (1910), James Monroe Hall (1911), Virginia Hall (1914), Chandler Hall (1928), Seacobeck Hall (1930), and Bridge to Dining Hall (Seacobeck Hall) (1930). He was the first and "Defining architect" and remained "responsible for the siting, orientation, and design of buildings from the founding until his death in 1932."
- University of Richmond: Milhiser Gymnasium (1919), T.C. Williams Law School Additions at 601 North Lombardy (1924), Puryer Hall (1926), Cannon Memorial Chapel (1928), Richmond Hall (1929), Jenkins Outdoor Theater (1929), and Maryland Hall (1932).
- Radford University: Master plan, Administration Building, and dormitories.
- Lutheran Theological Seminary Building: Beam Dormitory, 4201 Main St., Columbia, South Carolina, built in 1911, NRHP-listed.

=== Public school buildings ===
- Thomas Jefferson High School, 4100 W. Grace Street, Richmond, Virginia, NRHP-listed. Considered to be Robinson's "masterpiece."
- John B. Cary School (renamed the West End School in 1954), 2100 Idlewood Ave., Richmond, Virginia, NRHP-listed.
- Appomattox Agricultural High School, a NRHP-listed building constructed in 1908, now the Appomattox Middle School. A contributing building in the Appomattox Historic District, it is located roughly along High, Church, Highland, Virginia Route 131, Linden, Lee Grant, Oakleigh and Evergreen, in Appomattox, Virginia.
- Highland Park Public School, 1221 East Brookland Park Boulevard, Richmond, Virginia. Converted into a residential facility for senior citizens in the 1990s, and renamed Brookland Park Plaza, NRHP-listed.
- Anna P. Bolling Junior High School, 35 W. Fillmore St., Petersburg, Virginia, NRHP-listed.
- Clarendon School, 3550 Wilson Bvd., Arlington, Virginia, later converted and renamed the Arlington Arts Center, NRHP-listed.
- Peabody Building of the Peabody-Williams School, Jones St., Petersburg, Virginia, NRHP-listed.
- Orange High School, 224 Belleview Ave., Orange, Virginia, NRHP-listed.
- Shea Terrace Elementary School, 253 Constitution Ave., Portsmouth, Virginia, NRHP-listed.
- Springfield School, 608 North 28th Street, Richmond, Virginia, NRHP-listed.
- Nathaniel Bacon School, 815 North 35th Street, Richmond, Virginia, NRHP-listed.
- Kenbridge High School, 511 East Fifth Avenue, Kenbridge, Virginia, NRHP-listed as part of the Fifth Avenue Historic District (1921).
- Matthew Whaley School, 301 Scotland St., Williamsburg, Virginia, NRHP-listed.
- William Fox School 1911, c. 1920, east and west additions, Charles M. Robinson. 2300 Hanover Ave. School suffered a devastating structural fire in 2022 and it was named to Preservation Virginia's list of Most Endangered Historic Places; it is hoped that major elements of the structure will be preserved in the rebuilding process
- Suffolk High School in Suffolk, Virginia (converted in 2006 into the Suffolk Center for Cultural Arts).
- Harry Hunt Junior High School.
- Albert Hill School in Richmond, Virginia.
- Louisa High School, 212 Fredericksburg Avenue, Louisa, Virginia.
- Bennett School, 9300 Lee Avenue, Manassas, Virginia.

=== Other buildings ===
- Landmark Theater, formerly known as the Mosque, 6 N. Laurel St., Richmond, Virginia. With Marcellus E. Wright Sr. The theater was the most elaborate and largest (4,600 seats) ever built in Richmond.
- Newport News Public Library, 2907 West Ave., Newport News, Virginia, NRHP-listed.
- Grace Hospital, 401 West Grace St., Richmond, Virginia, NRHP-listed.
- Commonwealth Park Hotel, formerly Hotel Rueger and later the Raleigh Hotel, 9 North 9th Street, Richmond, Virginia. NRHP-listed as part of the Main Street Banking Historic District.
- Grace Lutheran Church in Altoona, Pennsylvania.
- Medical Arts Building, Newport News, Virginia (1928)
