= Beam Dormitory =

- Lutheran Theological Seminary Building: Beam Dormitory
- U.S. National Register of Historic Places
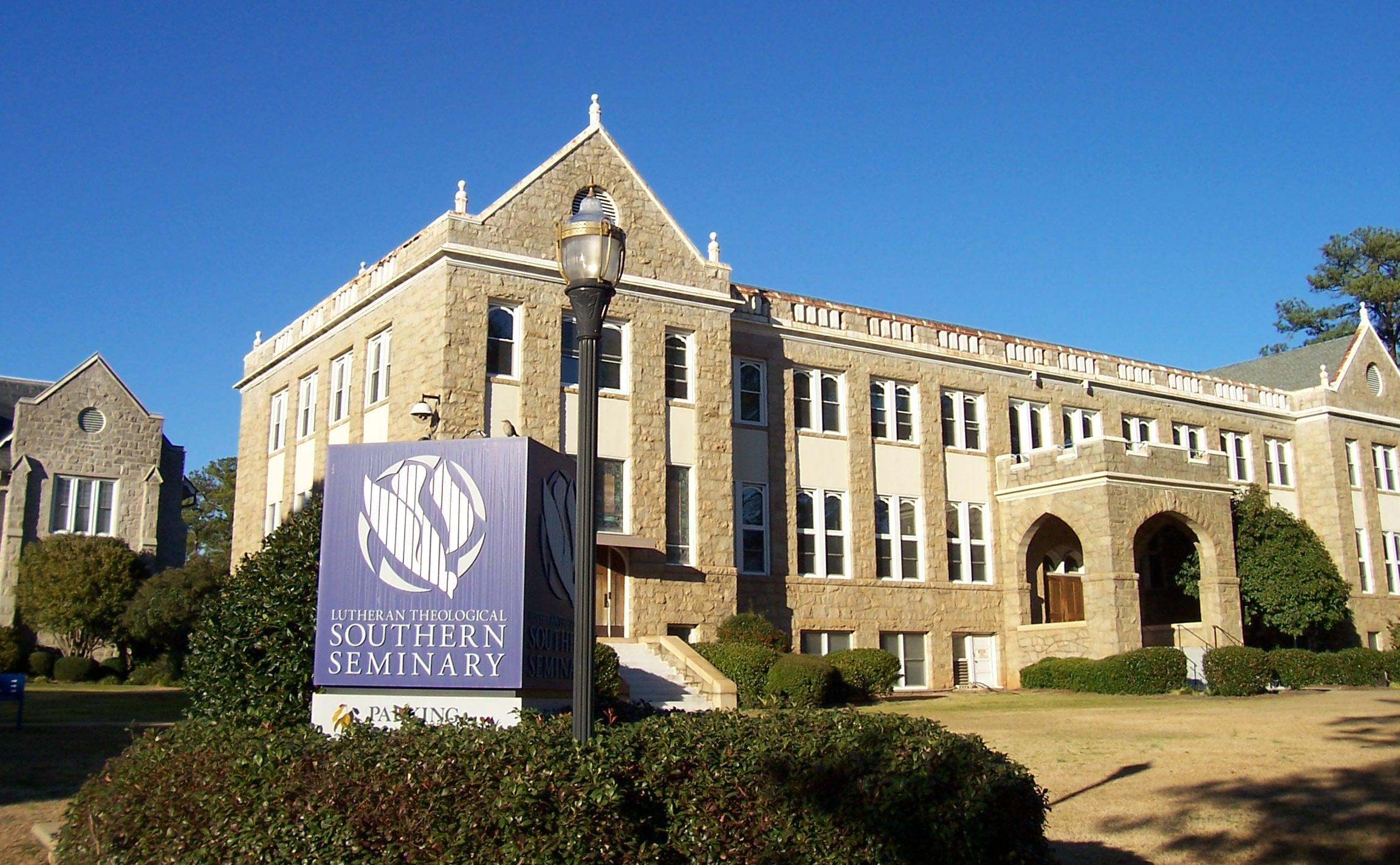

- Location within South Carolina Location within the United States
- Location: 4201 Main St., Columbia, South Carolina
- Coordinates: 34°2′33.4″N 81°2′18.5″W
- Area: 0.5 acres (0.20 ha)
- Built: 1911
- Built by: Wise Granite Co.
- Architect: Charles M. Robinson
- MPS: Columbia MRA
- NRHP reference No.: 79003353
- Added to NRHP: August 28, 1979

Beam Dormitory was the first permanent building at the American Lutheran Theological Southern Seminary in Columbia, South Carolina. It was built on the highest point in Columbia in 1911 based on a design by noted Virginia architect Charles M. Robinson. The structure was built by Wise Granite Co. It included a chapel, housing, refectory, classrooms, and faculty offices. Beam Hall is now used as a dormitory and also contains office suites, meeting rooms, and an exercise facility. The building was listed on the National Register of Historic Places in 1979.
