= Thomas Jefferson High School (Richmond, Virginia) =

- U.S. National Register of Historic Places
- Virginia Landmarks Register
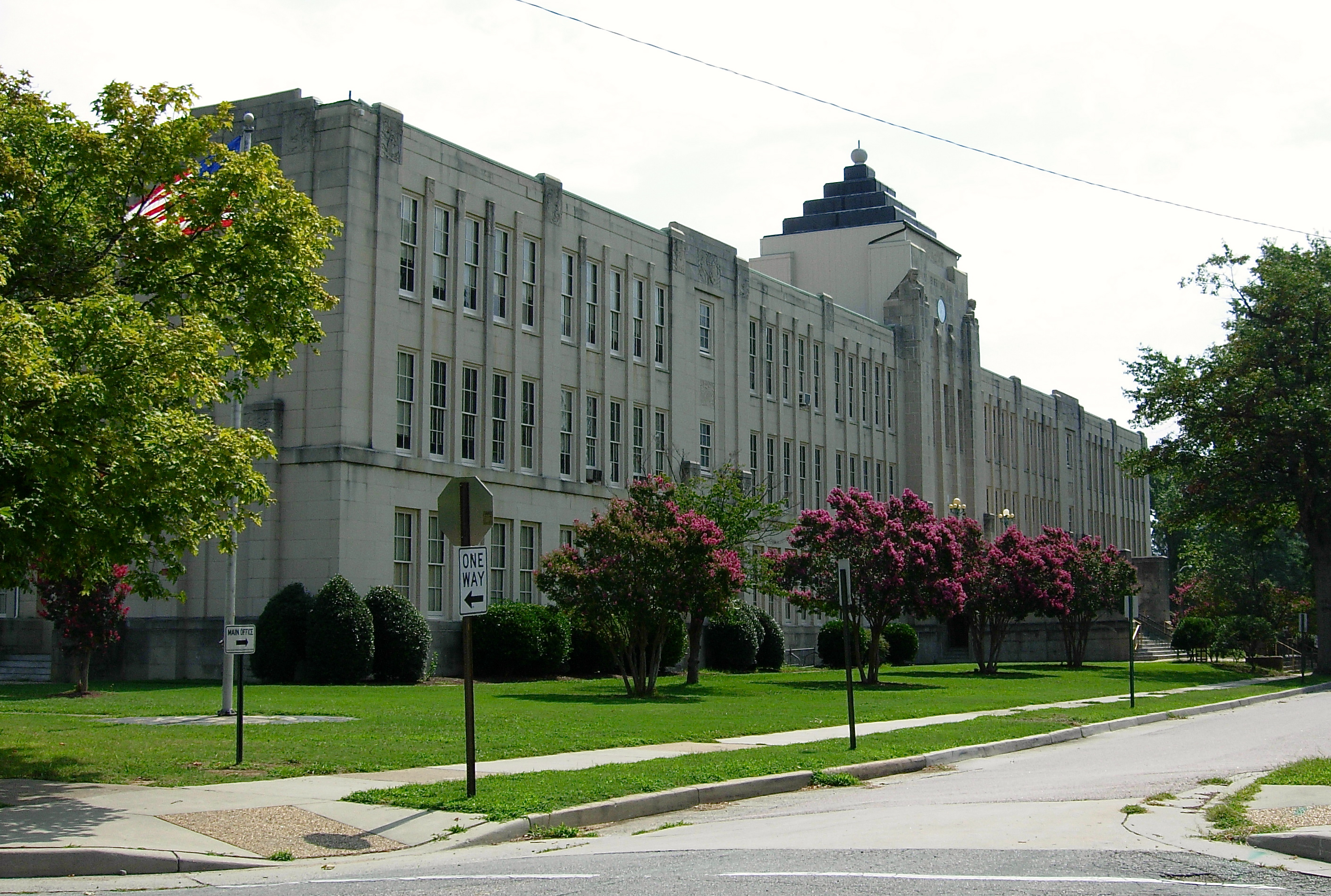

- Location within Virginia Location within the United States
- Location: 4100 W. Grace St., Richmond, Virginia
- Coordinates: 37.5715°N 77.4863°W
- Area: 12 acres (4.9 ha)
- Built: 1929
- Architect: Charles M. Robinson
- Architectural style: Art Deco
- MPS: Public Schools of Richmond MPS
- NRHP reference No.: 93001441
- VLR No.: 127-0431

Significant dates
- Added to NRHP: December 23, 1993
- Designated VLR: October 20, 1993

Thomas Jefferson High School is a historic high school in Richmond, Virginia. It is part of the Richmond Public Schools. The Art Deco building, constructed in 1929 and opened in 1930, has been listed on the U.S. National Register of Historic Places. It was designed by architect Charles M. Robinson. In his book, The Virginia Landmarks Register, Calder Loth refers to the school as Robinson's "masterpiece" and notes that the structure is "a celebration of education, a building redolent of civic pride."

James E. Ryan's book Five Miles Away, A World Apart: One City, Two Schools, and the Story of Educational Opportunity in Modern America discusses school segregation by comparing TJHS to nearby Freeman High School, which is in suburban Henrico County.

== Notable alumni ==
- H. Coleman McGehee Jr. (1923–2013), lawyer and Episcopal bishop
- Kendrick Warren, college and professional basketball player
- Jimmie W. Monteith (1917-1944), Received the Medal of Honor during World War II
