= John B. Cary School =

- U.S. National Register of Historic Places
- Virginia Landmarks Register
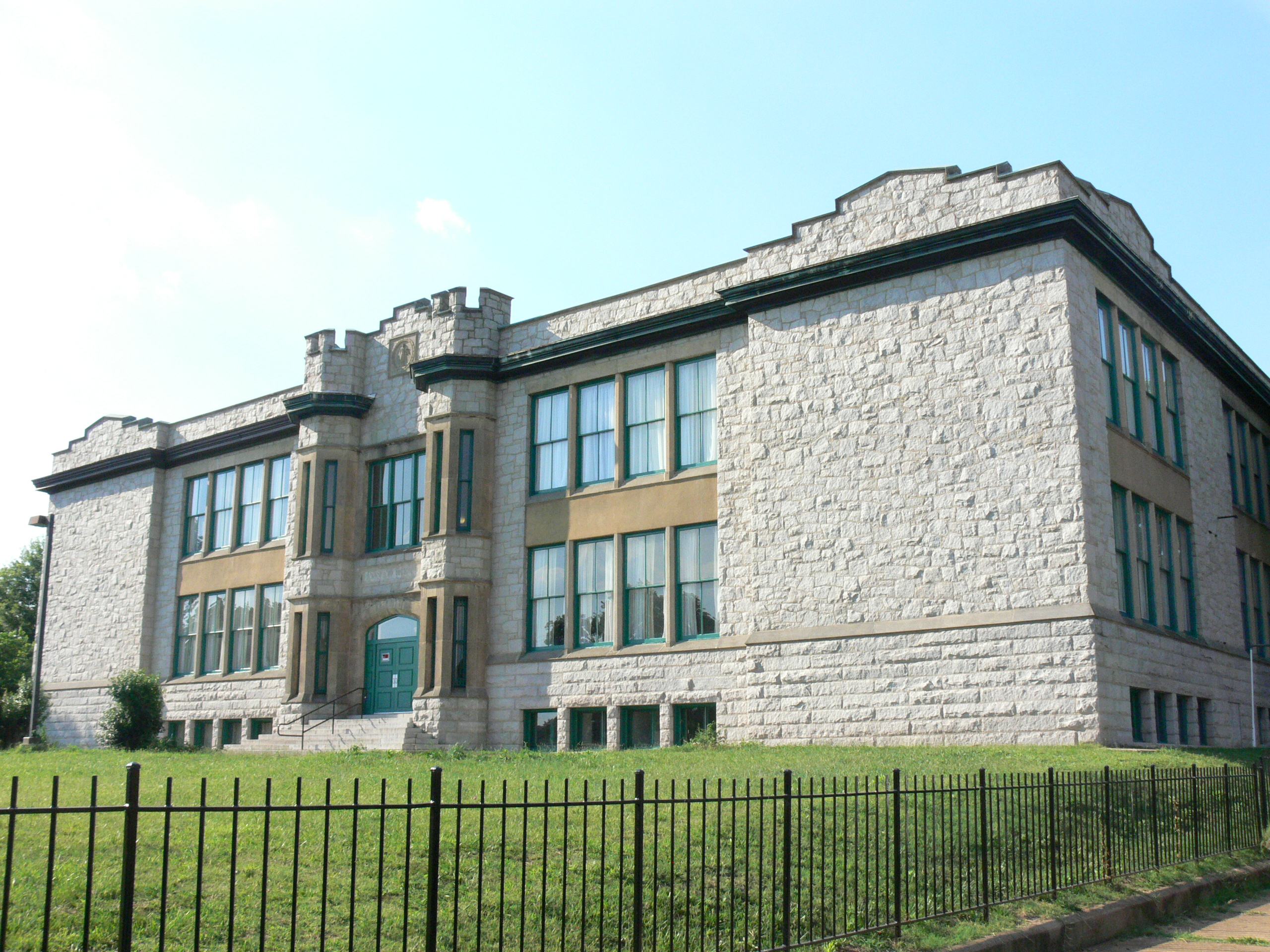

- Location within Virginia Location within the United States
- Location: 2100 Idlewood Ave., Richmond, Virginia
- Coordinates: 37°32′48″N 77°28′09″W
- Area: 2.1 acres (0.85 ha)
- Built: 1912
- Architect: Charles M. Robinson
- Architectural style: Late Gothic Revival
- MPS: Public Schools of Richmond MPS
- NRHP reference No.: 92001030
- VLR No.: 127-0824

Significant dates
- Added to NRHP: August 24, 1992
- Designated VLR: December 11, 1991

John B. Cary School is a historic school building located in Richmond, Virginia. The structure was built by the Wise Granite Company from 1912 to 1913 based on a design by noted Virginia architect Charles M. Robinson. The building is considered to be an outstanding example of Gothic Revival architecture. It is a 2 1/2-story, granite faced that has been little altered since its original construction. The school was named for Confederate Colonel John B. Cary, who served as the superintendent of the Richmond Public Schools from 1886 to 1889. In 1954, the school was renamed the West End School, when the school was converted for use as a school for African-American students in Richmond's segregated public school system. The building was listed on the National Register of Historic Places in 1992.

When West End School was formed John B. Cary School moved to a new location, 3021 Maplewood Ave, Richmond, as a White school. West End School was opened until 1976. The building of the new expressway displaced many families and enrollment dropped. The building housed the Adult Accelerated Learning Center (AALEC) from 1976 to 1984 and Franklin Military School from 1984 to 1986. It was released to the city to be sold in 1989. In 2012 the building became Winthrop Manor, an assisted living facility.

John B. Cary School moved from a segregated enrollment to an open one in 1969. It was recognized by the U. S. Department of Education as one of Virginia's most outstanding elementary schools in 1987 and 1988.

In 2012 the city considered closing the school due to lowered enrollment. As of 2012, fewer than 39 percent of the children who live in the Cary school zone attend there.
