= Woodrow Wilson Hall =

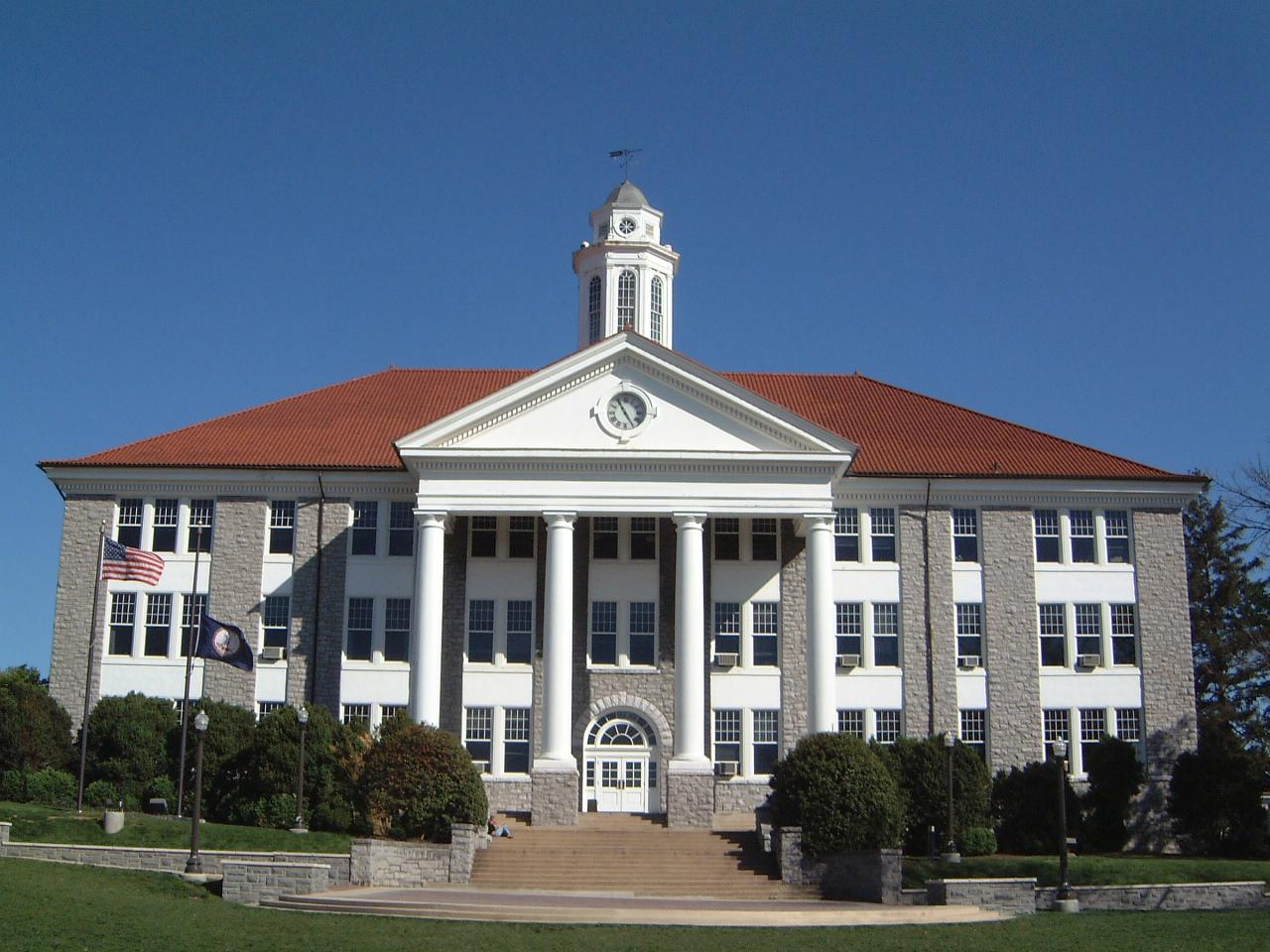
- Wilson Hall at the quadrangle of James Madison University, 2006
- Interactive map of the Woodrow Wilson Hall area

General information
- Status: Completed
- Type: University campus building
- Location: Harrisonburg, Virginia
- Coordinates: 38.438056°N 78.873174°W
- Construction started: June 19, 1930
- Completed: 1931
- Opening: May 15, 1931
- Cost: ~$250,000
- Owner: James Madison University
- Operator: James Madison University

Height
- Top floor: 3

Technical details
- Floor count: 3

Design and construction
- Architect: Charles M. Robinson
- Developer: Nielsen Construction Company

Woodrow Wilson Hall (also known as Wilson Hall) is an academic building on the campus of James Madison University (JMU) in Harrisonburg, Virginia. Dedicated on May 15, 1931, the building's namesake is U.S. President Woodrow Wilson, who was born in nearby Staunton.

The cornerstone of Wilson Hall was laid on June 19, 1930. The building was constructed out of a blue-gray colored limestone block known as "bluestone" mined from several local quarries.

== Occupancy and use ==
Wilson Hall initially served as the main administration building for the university and housed the president's office, the post office, classrooms (located on the second and third floors), and the first permanent auditorium on campus (built with a capacity to seat 1,400). During the late 1930s, a recording and broadcasting studio was built in the basement. In the late 1960s, Wilson Hall hosted a men's lounge. For a number of years, the art department was housed within the building. The last classroom, a geography classroom and laboratory was moved out of Wilson Hall in 1990–91. Wilson Hall now houses the university's Department of History.

== Architecture ==
The building was designed by architect Charles M. Robinson. Constructed as the centerpiece of the JMU quadrangle, Wilson Hall is a three-story building featuring a portico supported with four Roman Doric columns, and a hipped roof topped with a cupola. The inset windows of the building are enclosed by bluestone walls, and are placed in bays with a variable rhythm of three, one, and two. Facing northwest, Wilson Hall is flanked by Maury Hall (built in 1909) and Keezell Hall (built in 1927)

== In popular culture ==
The building has been enshrined in LEGO form with multiple, custom building sets available.

== Gallery ==
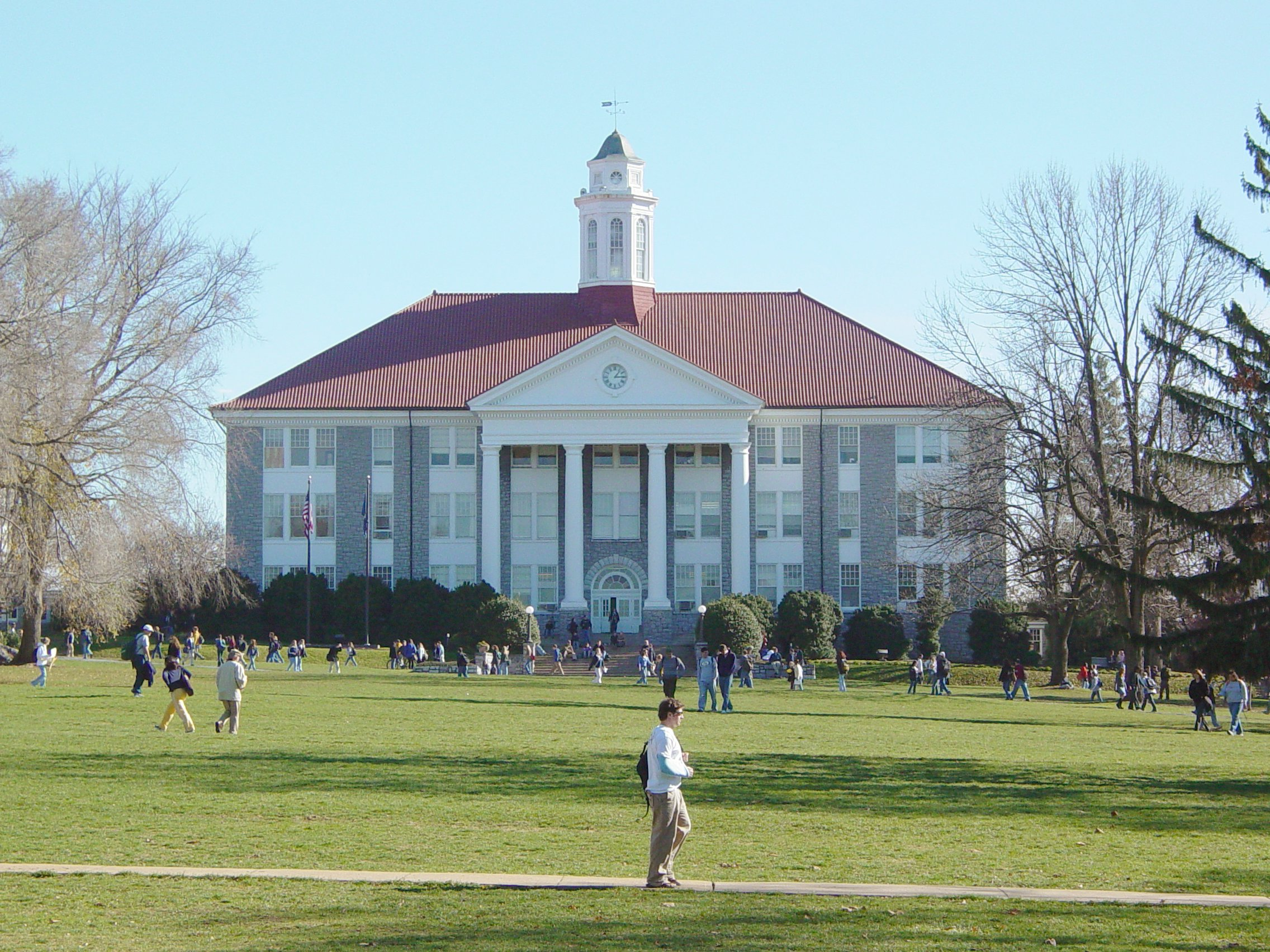
View of Wilson Hall from the JMU quadrangle

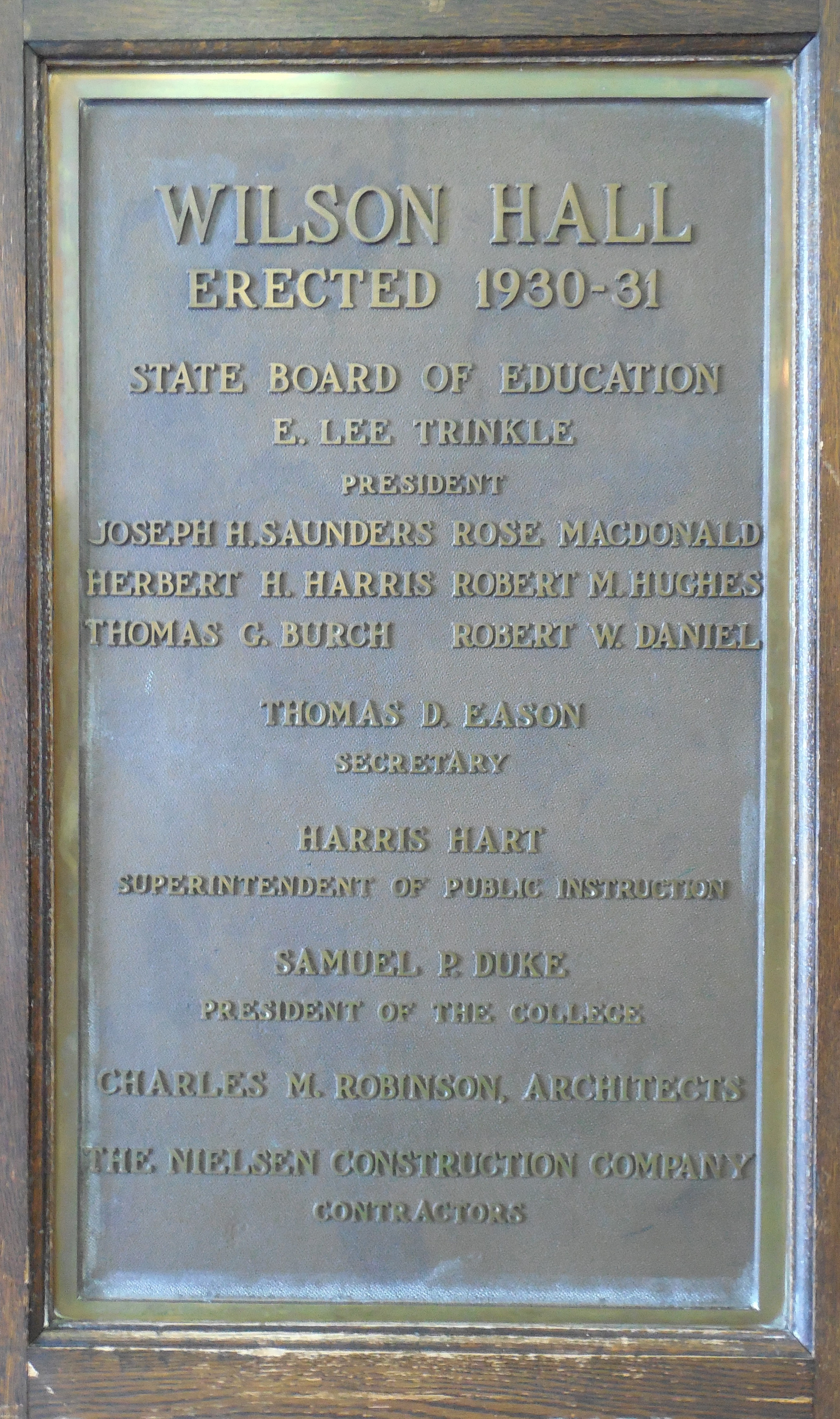
Wilson Hall dedication plaque

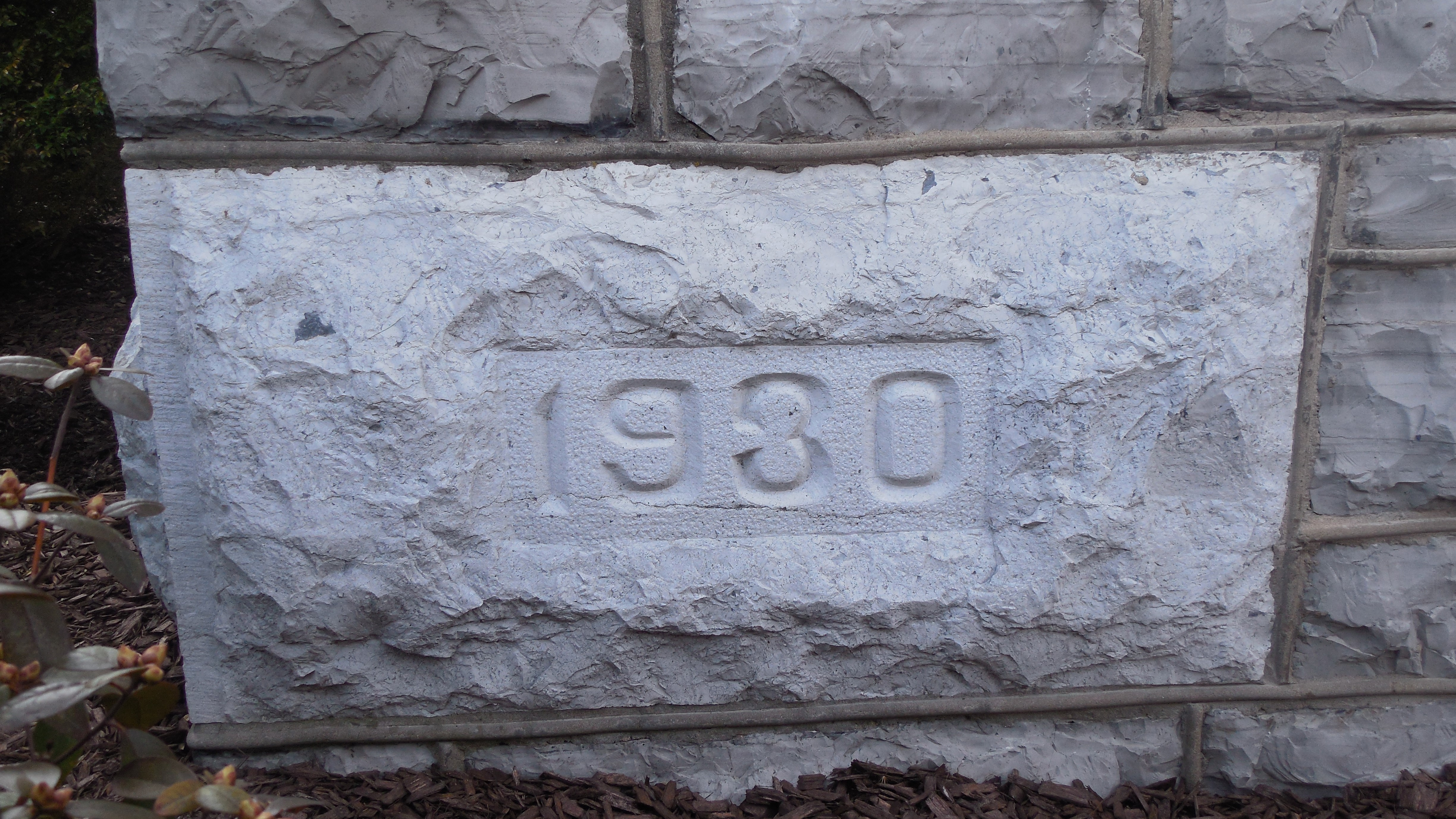
Wilson Hall cornerstone

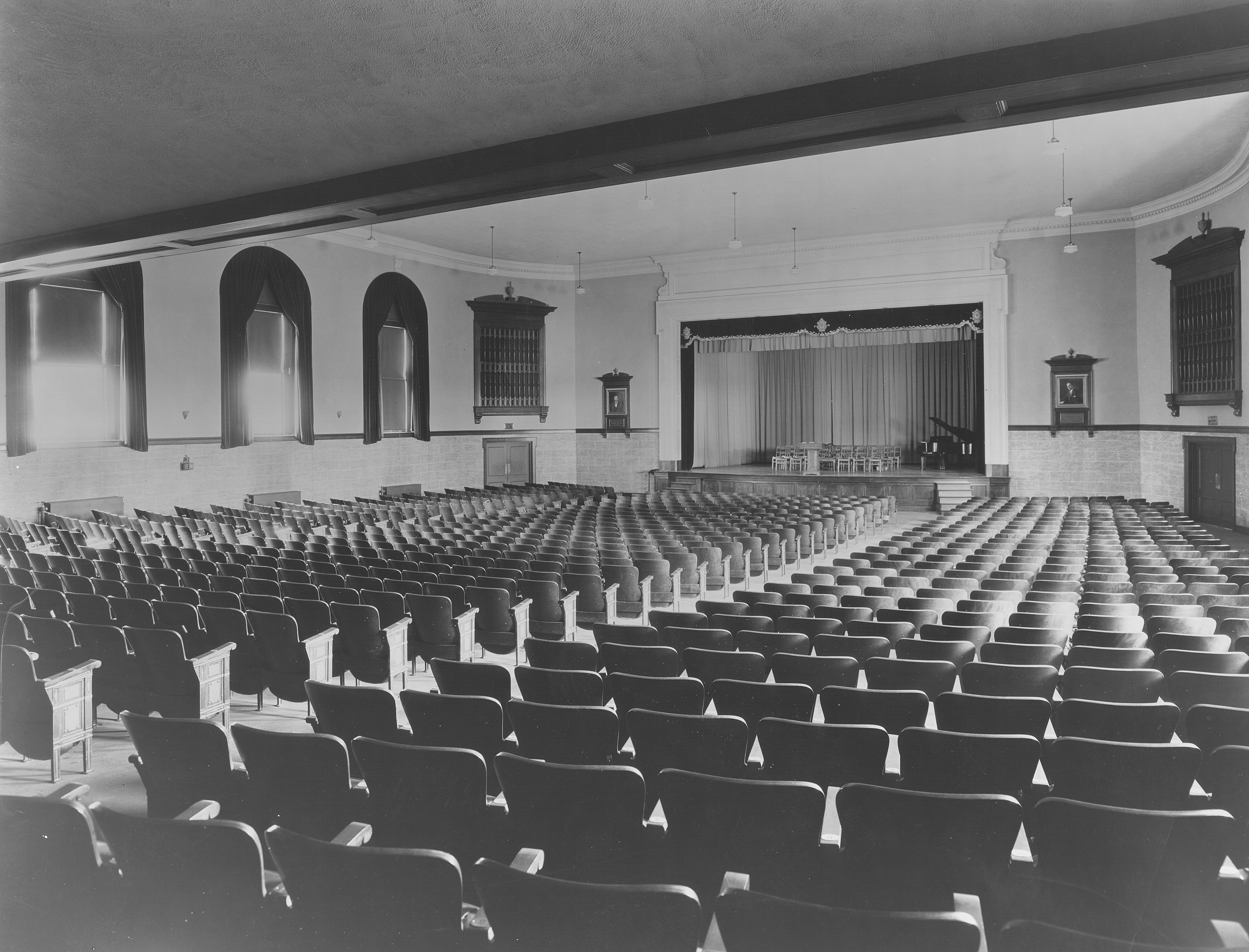
Undated historic image of the Wilson Hall Auditorium (which has since been renovated in 1988)

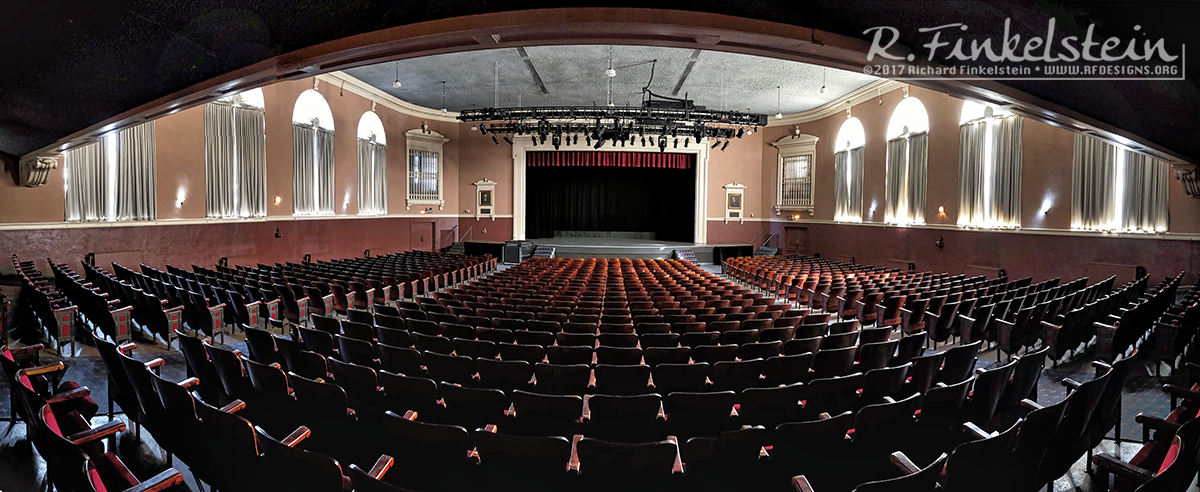
Wilson Auditorium on the campus of James Madison University looking toward the stage. Photographed by Richard Finkelstein in 2014.

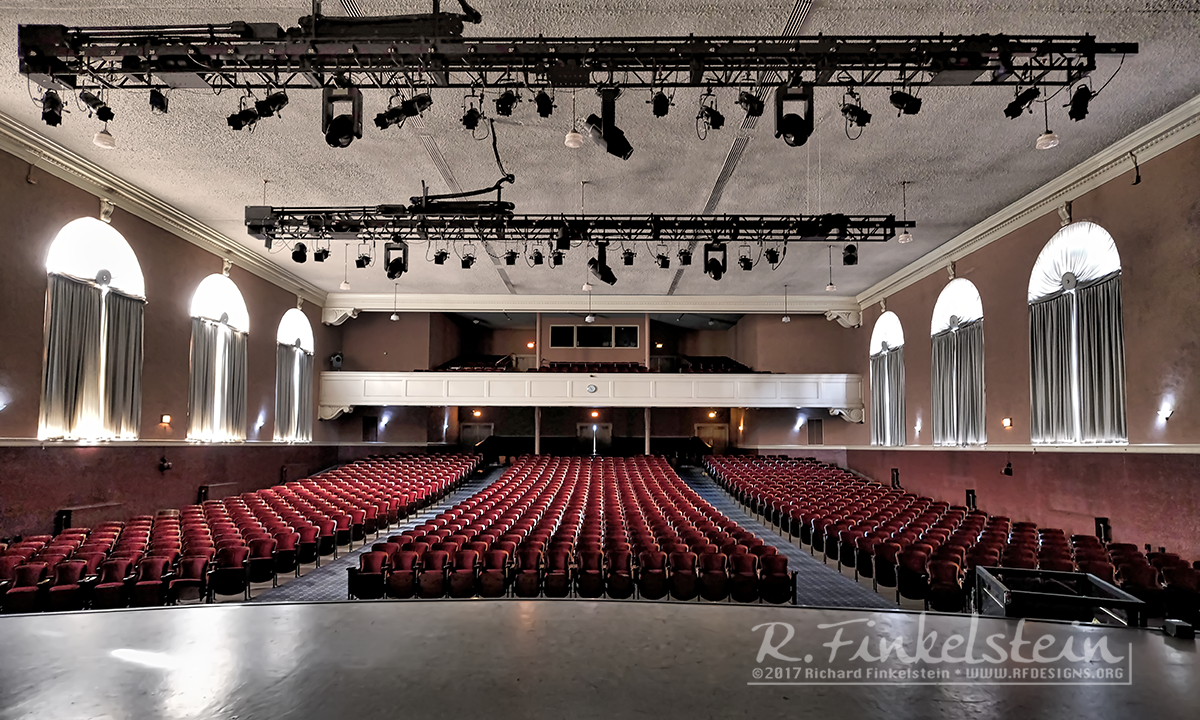
Wilson Auditorium on the campus of James Madison University looking toward the stage. Photographed by Richard Finkelstein in 2014.
