= Medical Arts Building (Newport News, Virginia) =

Historic commercial building in Virginia, US

- U.S. National Register of Historic Places
- Virginia Landmarks Register
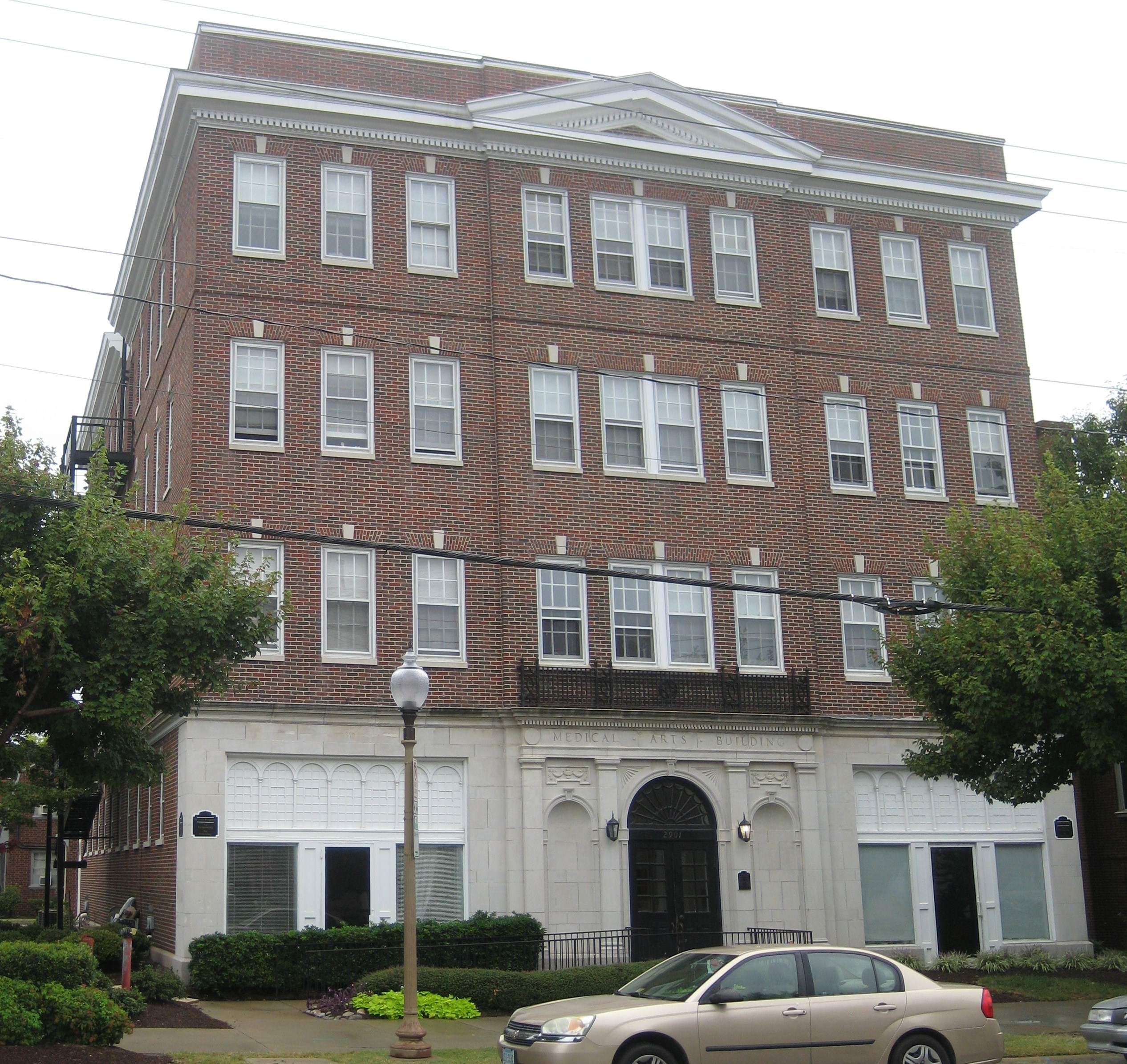
- Medical Arts Building, September 2012

- Location within Virginia Location within the United States
- Location: 2901 West Avenue, Newport News, Virginia
- Coordinates: 36°58′47″N 76°26′4″W
- Area: less than one acre
- Built: 1928
- Architectural style: Greek Revival
- NRHP reference No.: 02001001
- VLR No.: 121-0223

Significant dates
- Added to NRHP: September 14, 2002
- Designated VLR: June 12, 2002

Medical Arts Building is an American historic medical office building located at Newport News, Virginia. It was designed by architect Charles M. Robinson and built in 1928. It was listed on the National Register of Historic Places in 2002.

== Description ==
It is a four-story, nine bay by ten bay, rectangular brick building with Greek Revival-style decorative elements. It has a heavy galvanized metal, denticulated cornice with a denticulated pediment over the projecting center section. The flat roof is fronted by a tall, brick, parapet wall topped by cast concrete. The front entrance is flanked by pilasters that support the entablature with the incised name Medical Arts Building. Above this is a shallow denticulated cornice that crowns the entire composition and carries a cast iron balustrade or false balcony.

== History ==
The building was historically used as a commercial building and featured several doctors and dentists offices as early as 1931. Several of the original doctors offices had segregated waiting rooms for nonwhite patients, this was one of the few locations in the area nonwhites could go for medical care. By 1971 at least two of the original doctors offices still remained. In later years tenants would include the Seaman's union, several attorneys, and an insurance agency. The historic building has since been converted into senior living apartments.
