= Shea Terrace Elementary School =

- U.S. National Register of Historic Places
- Virginia Landmarks Register
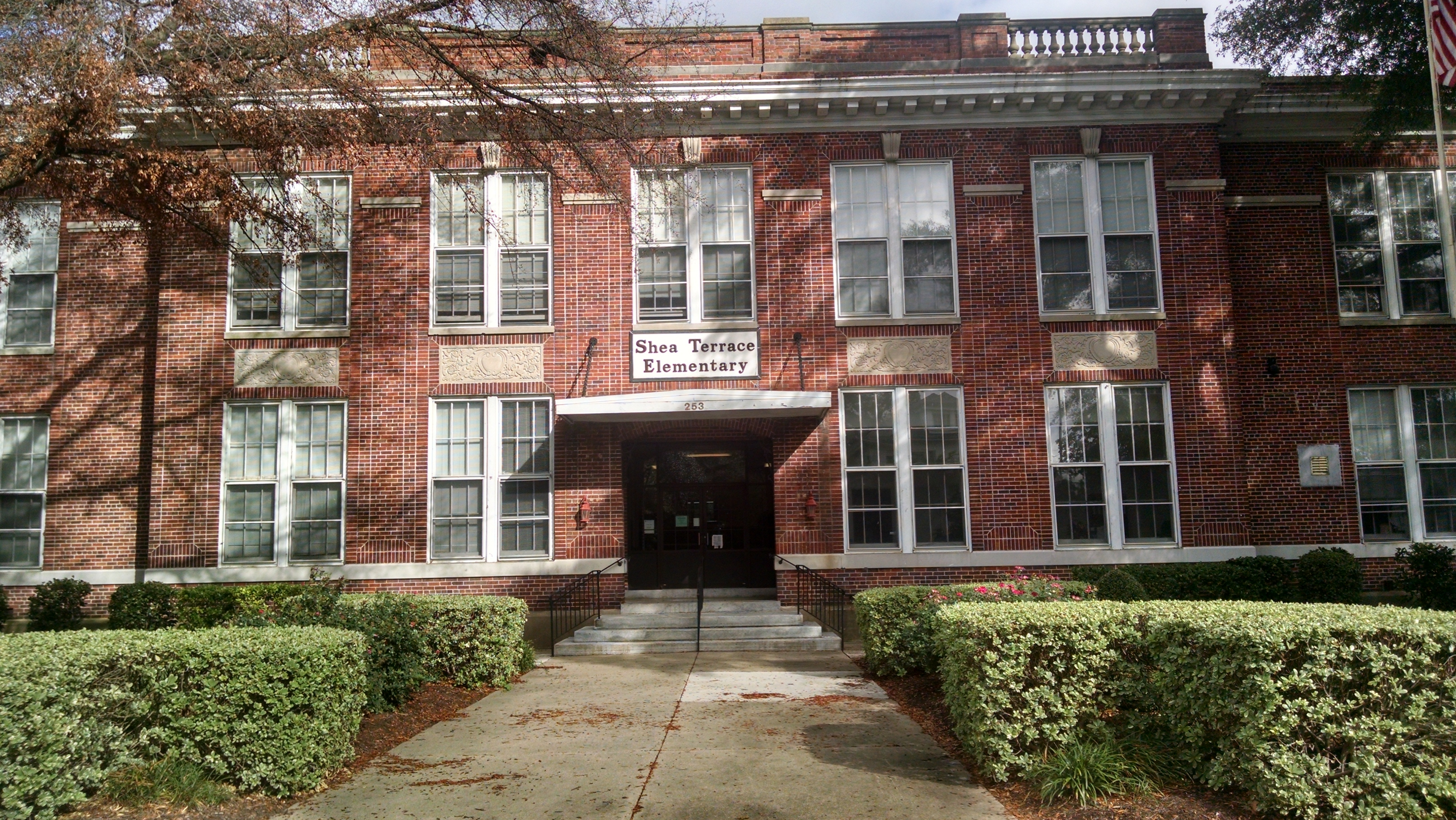

- Location within Virginia Location within the United States
- Location: 253 Constitution Ave., Portsmouth, Virginia
- Coordinates: 36°50′31″N 76°19′28″W
- Area: 1.9 acres (0.77 ha)
- Built: 1925
- Architect: Charles M. Robinson
- Architectural style: Late 19th And 20th Century Revivals
- NRHP reference No.: 02001002
- VLR No.: 124-5083

Significant dates
- Added to NRHP: September 14, 2002
- Designated VLR: June 12, 2002

Shea Terrace Elementary School is a historic school building located in Portsmouth, Virginia. The structure was built in 1925 based on a design by noted Virginia architect Charles M. Robinson. The school opened in September 1925 serving Portsmouth's Shea Terrace neighborhood. In a 2002 submission to have the structure listed on the National Register of Historic Places, the Virginia Department of Historical Resources noted the structure's association with Charles M. Robinson: "He is one of the most important Virginia architects of this period and his approach to school design and campus master planning continues to exert an influence today." The building was listed on the National Register of Historic Places in 2002.
