= Charles Robison =

Charles or Charlie Robison may refer to:

- Charles Robison (singer) (1890–1957), American country music singer and songwriter; also known as Carson Robison
- Charlie Robison (born 1964), American country music singer and songwriter
- Charles Robison, American public official; in 2017 replaced John Walsh (U.S. senator) at Montana's USDA Rural Development

== See also ==
- Charles Robinson (disambiguation)
