= Highland Park Public School =

- U.S. National Register of Historic Places
- Virginia Landmarks Register
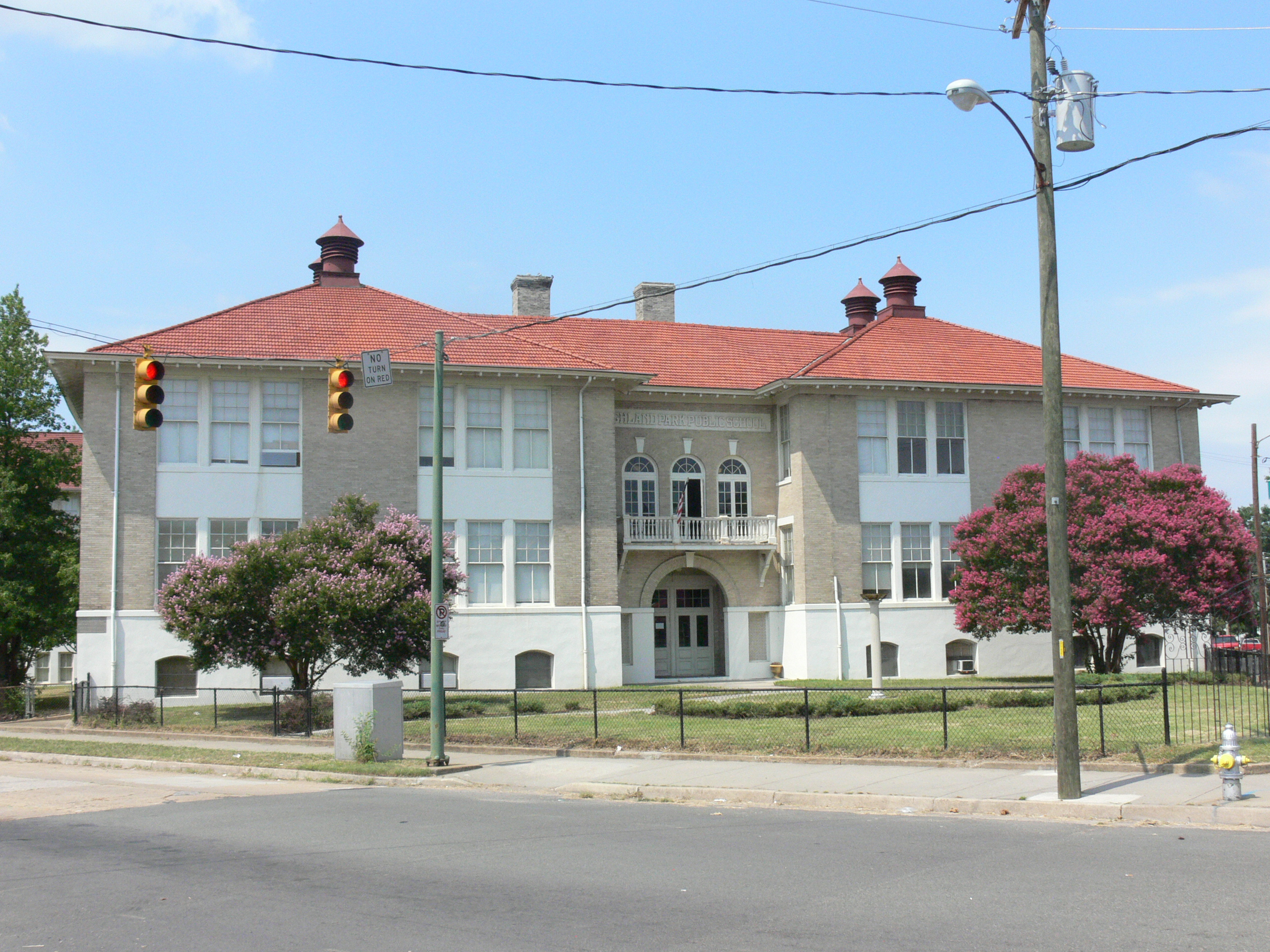

- Location within Virginia Location within the United States
- Location: 2928 Second Ave., Richmond, Virginia
- Coordinates: 37°34′11″N 77°25′08″W
- Area: 2.6 acres (1.1 ha)
- Built: 1909
- Architect: Charles M. Robinson
- Architectural style: Mediterranean Revival
- NRHP reference No.: 91001683
- VLR No.: 127-0355

Significant dates
- Added to NRHP: October 22, 1991
- Designated VLR: October 8, 1991

Highland Park Public School is a historic school building located in Richmond, Virginia. The structure was built in 1909 based on a design by noted Virginia architect Charles M. Robinson. The Mediterranean Revival building is a two-story brick and stucco structure topped by hipped roofs clad with terra cotta tiles. In its use of the Mediterranean Revival style, the building was a departure from the Georgian and Gothic styles commonly used in Virginia school buildings of the time. The building used as the community school for Highland Park, Virginia, until the community was annexed by the City of Richmond in 1914. It served thereafter as a neighborhood school in the Richmond public school system until it closed in the 1970s. The building is considered to be important as an example of the work of Charles M. Robinson, who served as Richmond School Board architect from 1909 to 1930. The building was listed on the National Register of Historic Places in 1991. The building was converted from 1990 to 1991 into a residential apartment complex for senior citizens and re-opened under the name Brookland Park Plaza.
