= Anna P. Bolling Junior High School =

- U.S. National Register of Historic Places
- Virginia Landmarks Register
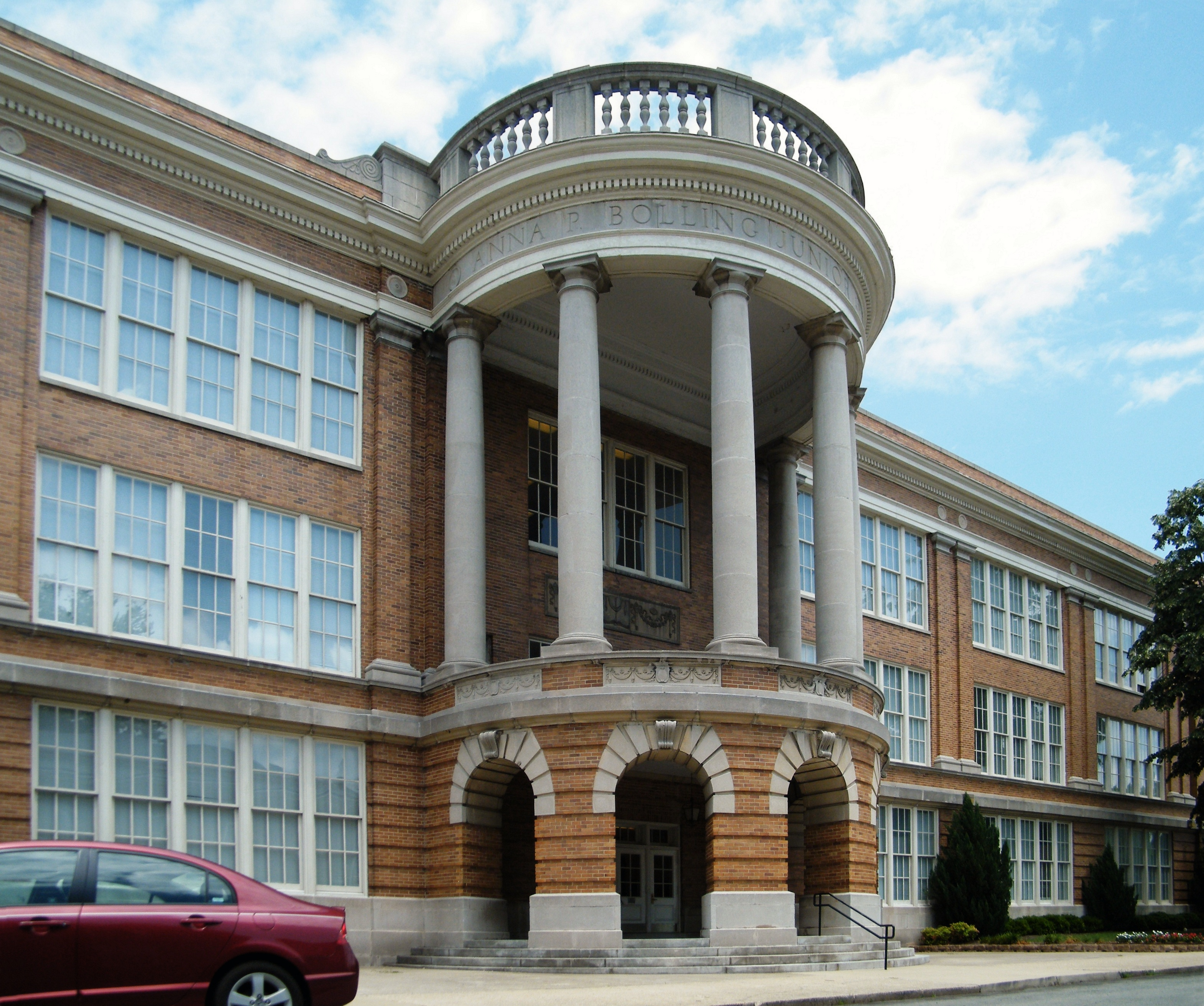

- Location within Virginia Location within the United States
- Location: 35 W. Fillmore St., Petersburg, Virginia
- Coordinates: 37°13′25″N 77°24′7″W
- Area: 1.9 acres (0.77 ha)
- Built: 1926
- Architect: Robinson, Charles M.
- Architectural style: Renaissance
- NRHP reference No.: 98001316
- VLR No.: 123-0117

Significant dates
- Added to NRHP: October 30, 1998
- Designated VLR: September 14, 1998

The Anna P. Bolling Junior High School is an American educational institution in Petersburg, Virginia, built in 1926 and listed on the National Register of Historic Places in 1998.

The school building was designed by architect Charles M. Robinson and is considered to be an "impressive example" of Second Renaissance Revival architecture.

The school was named for Anna Peyton Bolling, who started as a high school teacher in Petersburg when the city's public schools were established and served as the high school principal from 1876 to 1907. The school that was named for her was used as a school until 1974, after which time it housed city offices, then became vacant. As of 1998 it was being converted to become moderate-income apartments.
