= Henry Mansfield Cannon Memorial Chapel =

University chapel in Virginia, US

- U.S. National Register of Historic Places
- Virginia Landmarks Register
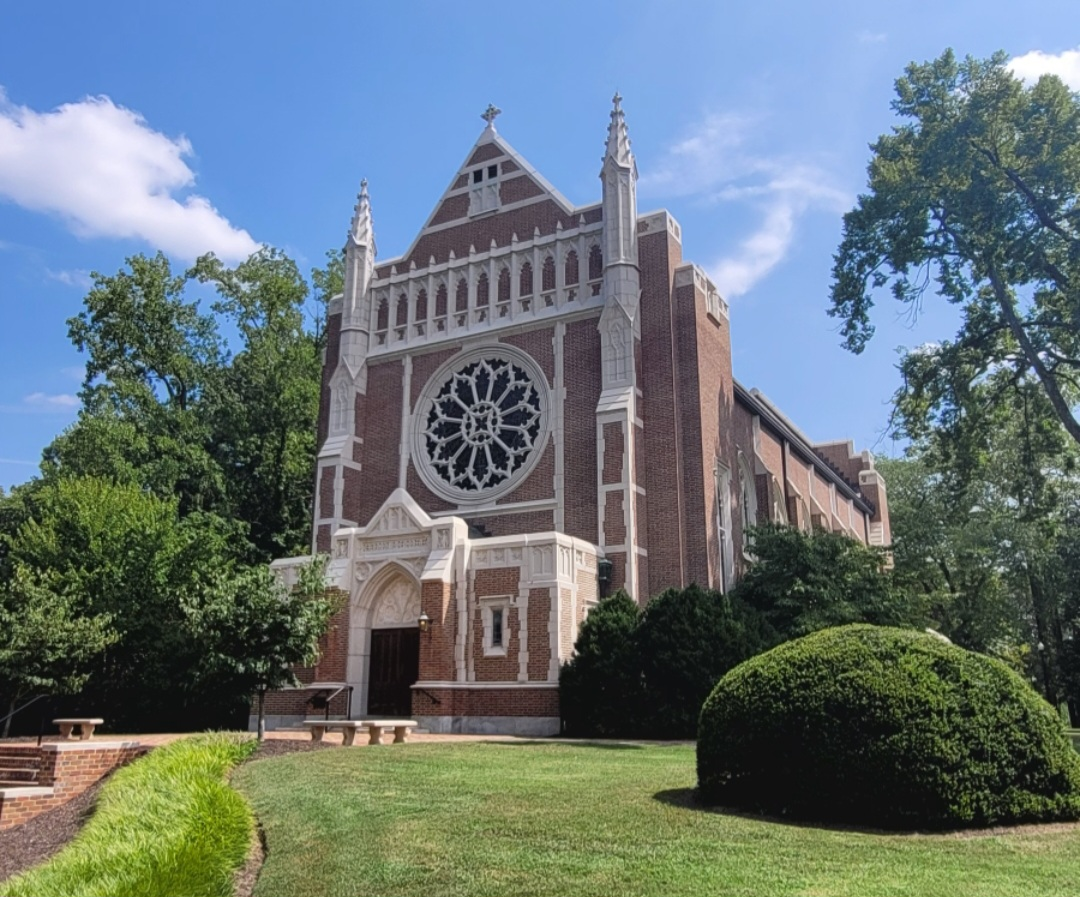
- The chapel in 2024

- Location within Virginia Location within the United States
- Location: 36 Westhampton Way, Richmond, Virginia
- Coordinates: 37°34′29″N 77°32′20″W
- Area: 1.312 acres (0.531 ha)
- Built: 1929
- Architect: Robinson, Charles M.
- Architectural style: Late Gothic Revival
- MPS: History and Architecture of the University of Richmond, 1834-1977
- NRHP reference No.: 13000259
- VLR No.: 127-0364-0009

Significant dates
- Added to NRHP: May 7, 2013
- Designated VLR: December 13, 2012

Henry Mansfield Cannon Memorial Chapel, also known as Cannon Chapel, is an American historic chapel located on the University of Richmond campus in Richmond, Virginia. It was designed by architect Charles M. Robinson and built in 1929 in the Late Gothic Revival style. It is constructed of brick, stone, and concrete and has a rectangular plan with a telescoping projection at the rear. During the mid-1980s, new stained glass windows were installed as part of a renovation project.

It was listed on the National Register of Historic Places in 2013.

== Gallery ==
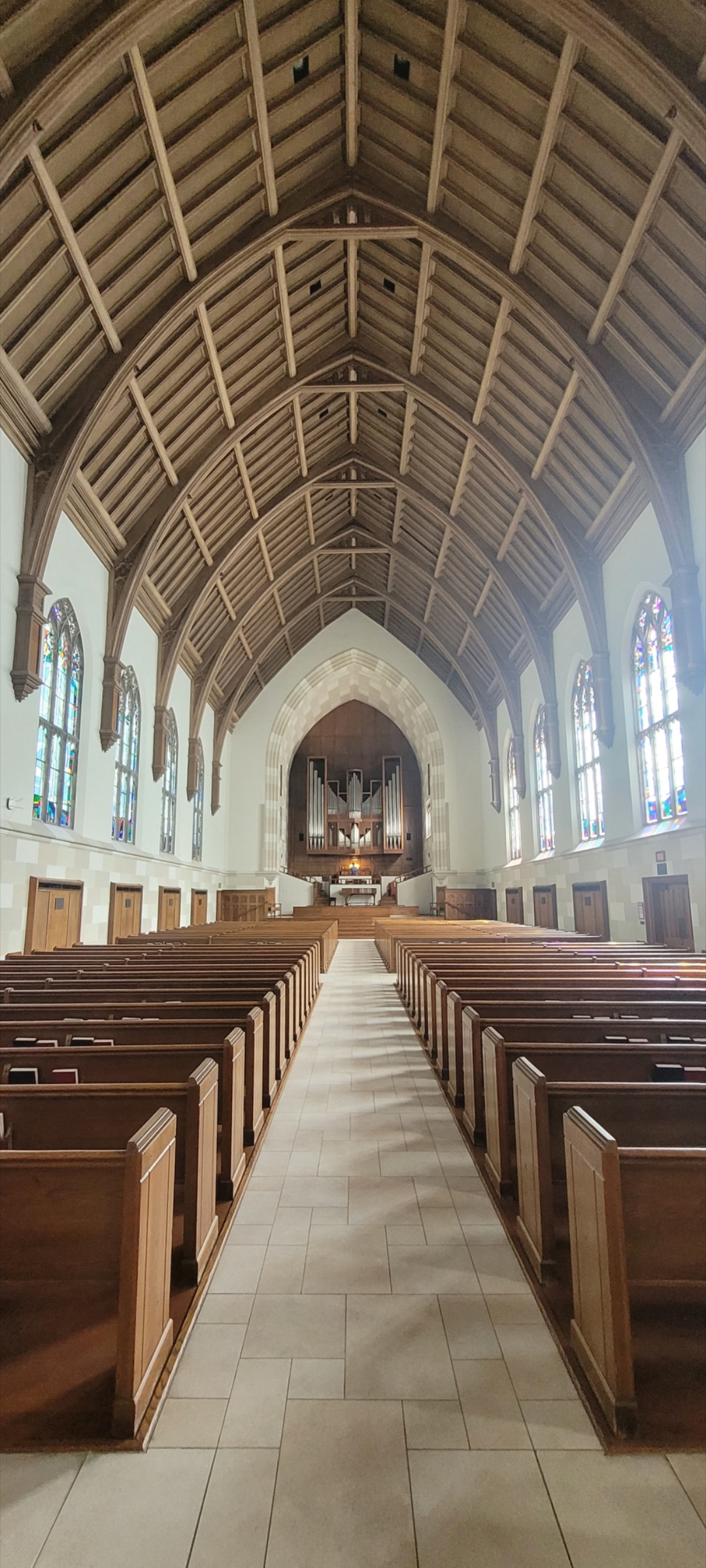
Interior
