= Springfield School, Richmond =

- Springfield School
- U.S. National Register of Historic Places
- Virginia Landmarks Register
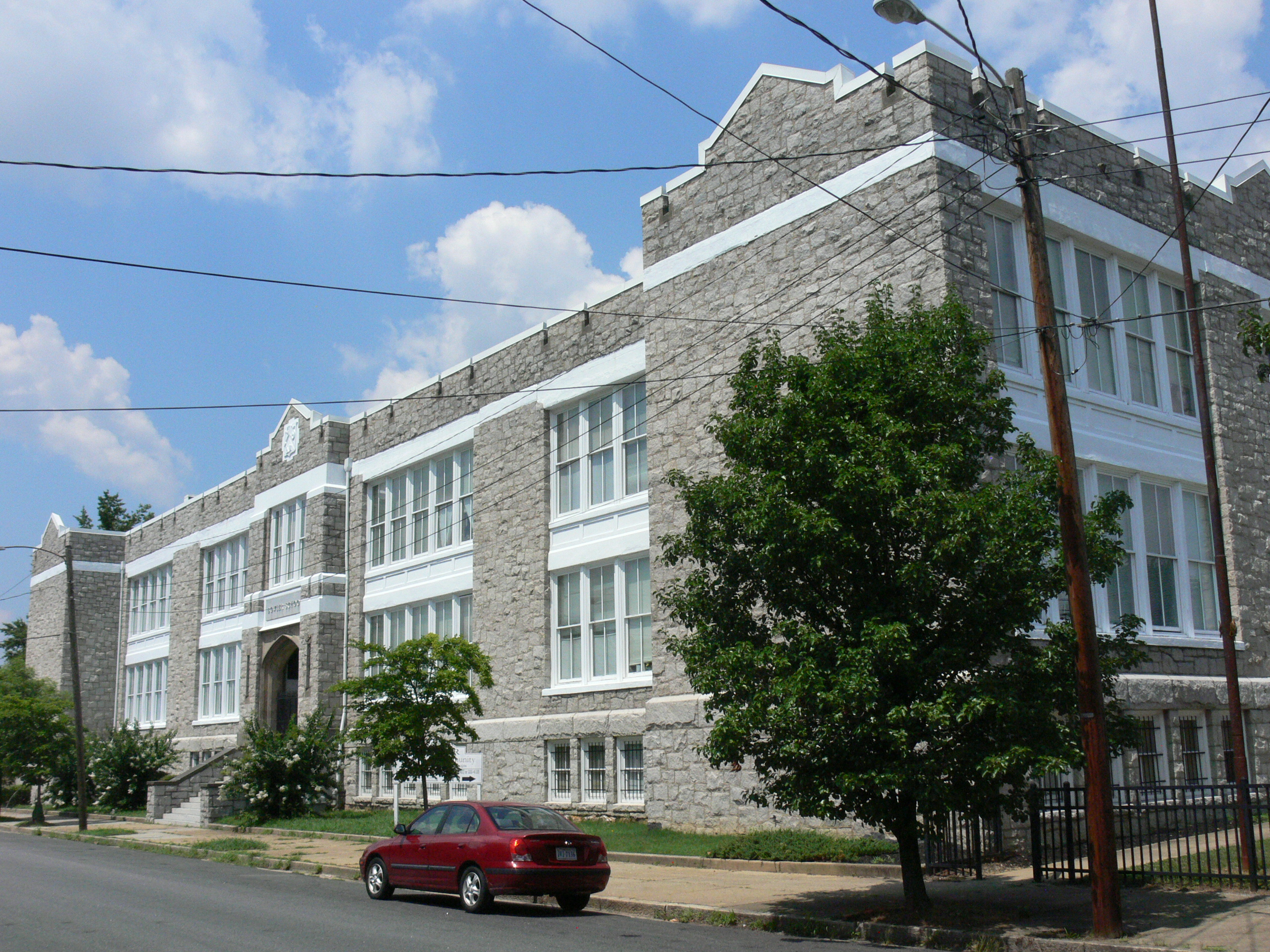

- Location within Virginia Location within the United States
- Location: 608 N. 26th St., Richmond, Virginia
- Coordinates: 37°32′3″N 77°24′56″W
- Area: 1.2 acres (0.49 ha)
- Built: 1913
- Architect: Charles M. Robinson
- Architectural style: Late Gothic Revival
- MPS: Public Schools of Richmond MPS
- NRHP reference No.: 92001032
- VLR No.: 127-0832

Significant dates
- Added to NRHP: August 24, 1992
- Designated VLR: December 11, 1991

Springfield School is a historic school building located in Richmond, Virginia. The Gothic Revival structure was built in 1913 based on a design by noted Virginia architect Charles M. Robinson. The 2 1/2-story structure has a granite exterior, a raised basement and a small penthouse. The building was listed on the National Register of Historic Places in 1992. Its inclusion on the National Register was based upon the school's association with an important period of development for the Richmond Public School system, its association with Charles M. Robinson, its Gothic Revival architectural style, and the unusual use of granite (rather than brick) as the exterior construction material for a school structure in the area.
