= Eau Claire Town Hall and Survey Publishing Company Building =

Historic government building in South Carolina, United States

- U.S. National Register of Historic Places
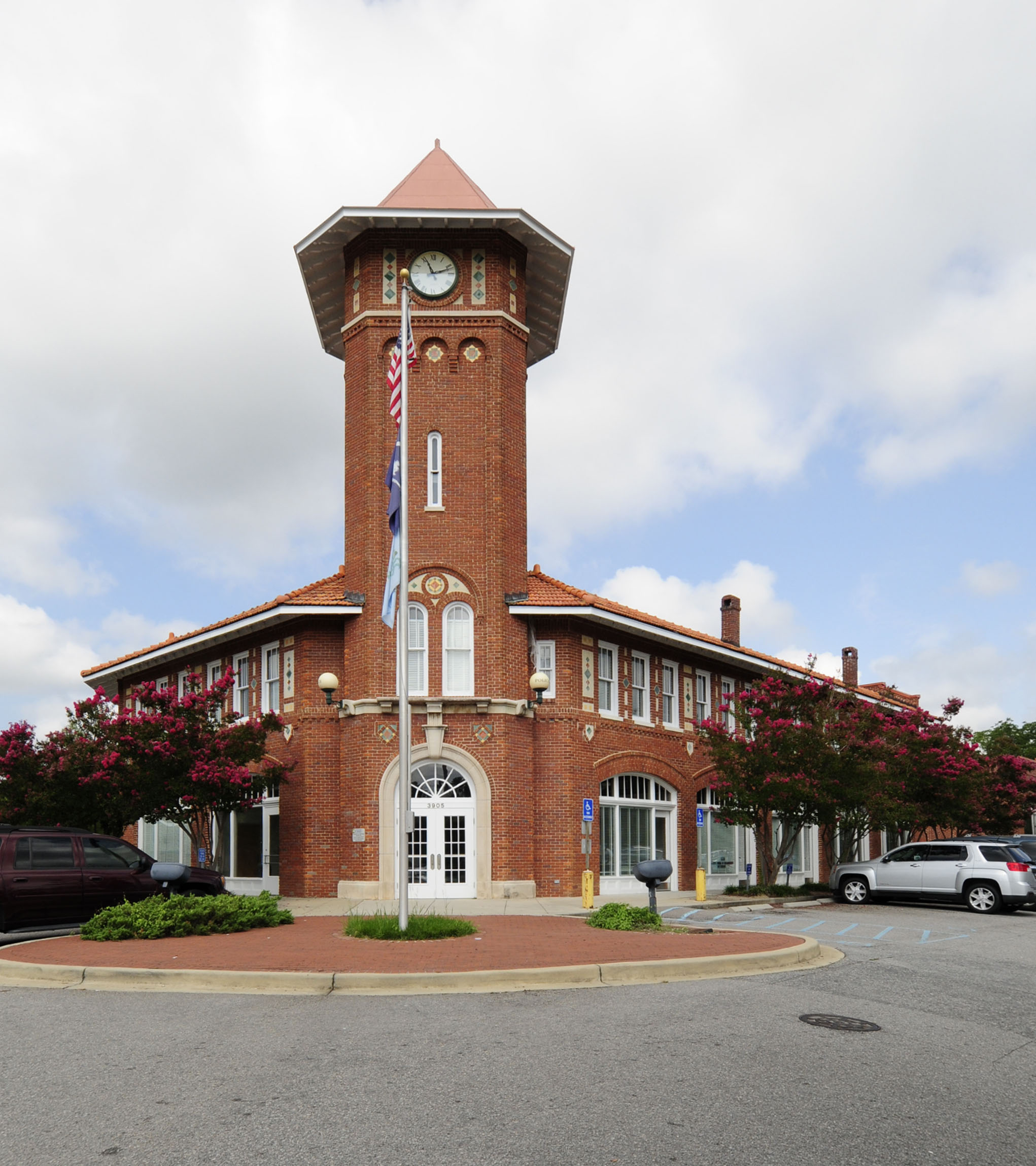

- Location within South Carolina Location within the United States
- Location: 3904 Monticello Rd., Columbia, South Carolina
- Coordinates: 34°2′22″N 81°2′28″W
- Area: 0.4 acres (0.16 ha)
- Built: 1914
- Architect: J. Carroll Johnson
- Architectural style: Early Commercial
- MPS: Columbia MRA
- NRHP reference No.: 79003371
- Added to NRHP: March 2, 1979

Eau Claire Town Hall and Survey Publishing Company Building is a building that was built for the Survey Publishing Company. Later it was the Eau Claire Town Hall. In 1979, it was named to the National Register of Historic Places in 1979.

== History ==
The building was started in 1912 and completed in 1914. It was first occupied by the Survey Publishing Company that published the American Lutheran Survey. The editor was Walton H. Greever, who was also a faculty member at the nearby Lutheran seminary. After the Survey folded, the building became the Eau Claire Town Hall from 1928 to 1955. In 1955, Eau Claire merged with the City of Columbia.

== Architecture ==
The building was designed by J. Carroll Johnson of Urquhart and Johnson in Columbia. The building is a two-story brick building with asymmetrical plan. It is decorated with tile and decorative concrete. It features a four-story tower on the southeast corner. The building has five arched bays on the east and west sides and two on the south side. There is also a one-story, brick building that was used for the printing plant.
