= Southern Seminary =

Southern Seminary may refer to:

- Lutheran Theological Southern Seminary
- Southern Virginia University
- Southern Baptist Theological Seminary
