= Orange High School (Orange, Virginia) =

- U.S. National Register of Historic Places
- Virginia Landmarks Register
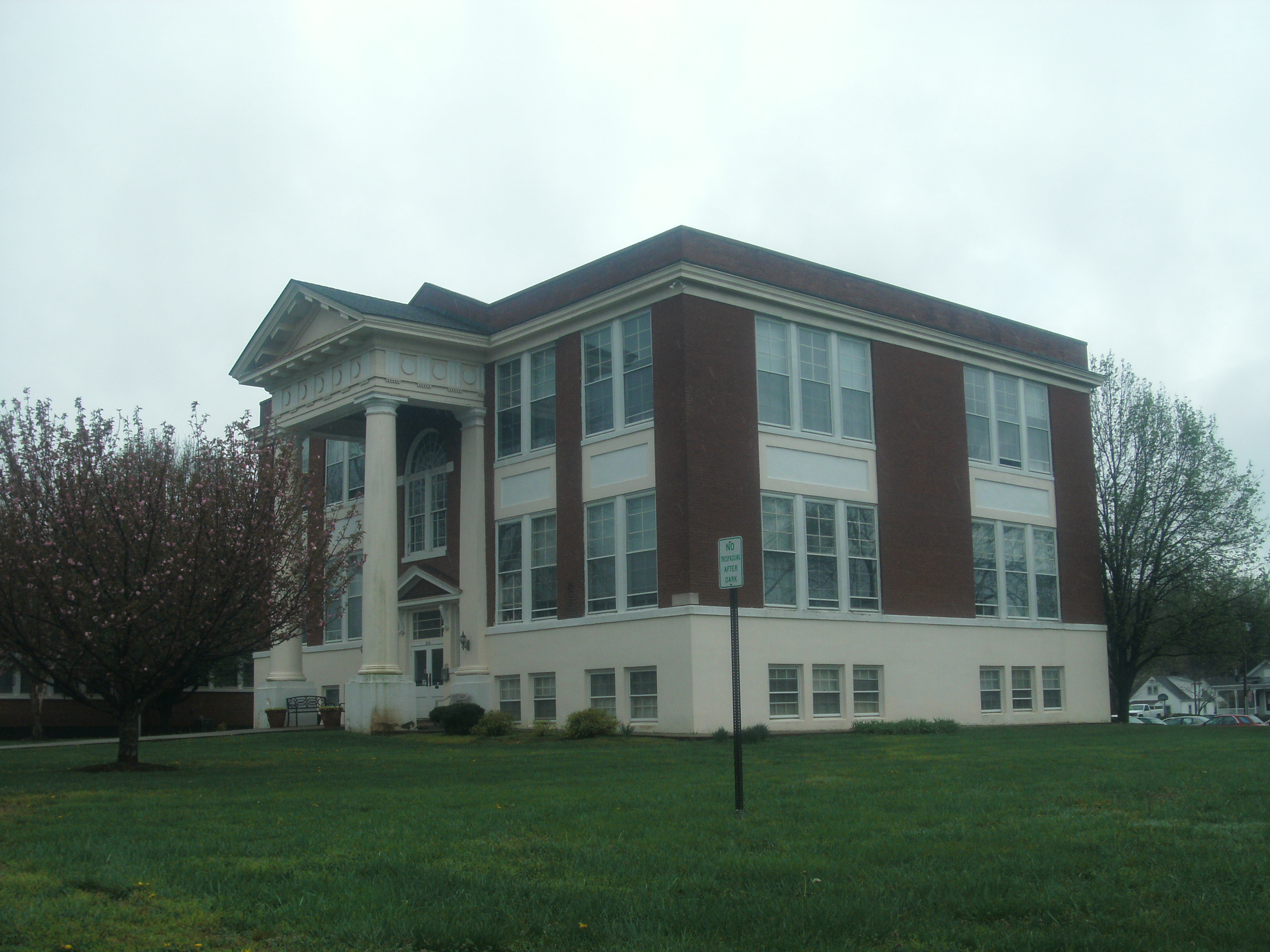
- Former Orange High School building, April 2017

- Location within Virginia Location within the United States
- Location: 224 Belleview Ave., Orange, Virginia
- Coordinates: 38°15′2″N 78°6′55″W
- Area: 2.6 acres (1.1 ha)
- Built: 1911
- Architect: Robinson, Charles M.
- Architectural style: Classical Revival
- NRHP reference No.: 01000692
- VLR No.: 275-5002

Significant dates
- Added to NRHP: July 05, 2001
- Designated VLR: March 14, 2001

Orange High School is a historic school located in Orange, Virginia. The first school building at the site was built in 1911 based on a design by noted Virginia architect Charles M. Robinson. The original structure is a 2 1/2-story building with a monumental Doric portico modeled on the Temple of Albano. In 1925, a one-story annex building was added next to the school. The school opened in 1911 as an elementary, middle, and high school. It continued in operation until 1970. When plans to demolish the original 1911 building were announced in the late 1990s, local residents protested. The property was converted for use as apartments for senior citizens.

The building was listed on the National Register of Historic Places in 2001.
