= Nathaniel Bacon School =

Historic building in Virginia, US

- U.S. National Register of Historic Places
- Virginia Landmarks Register
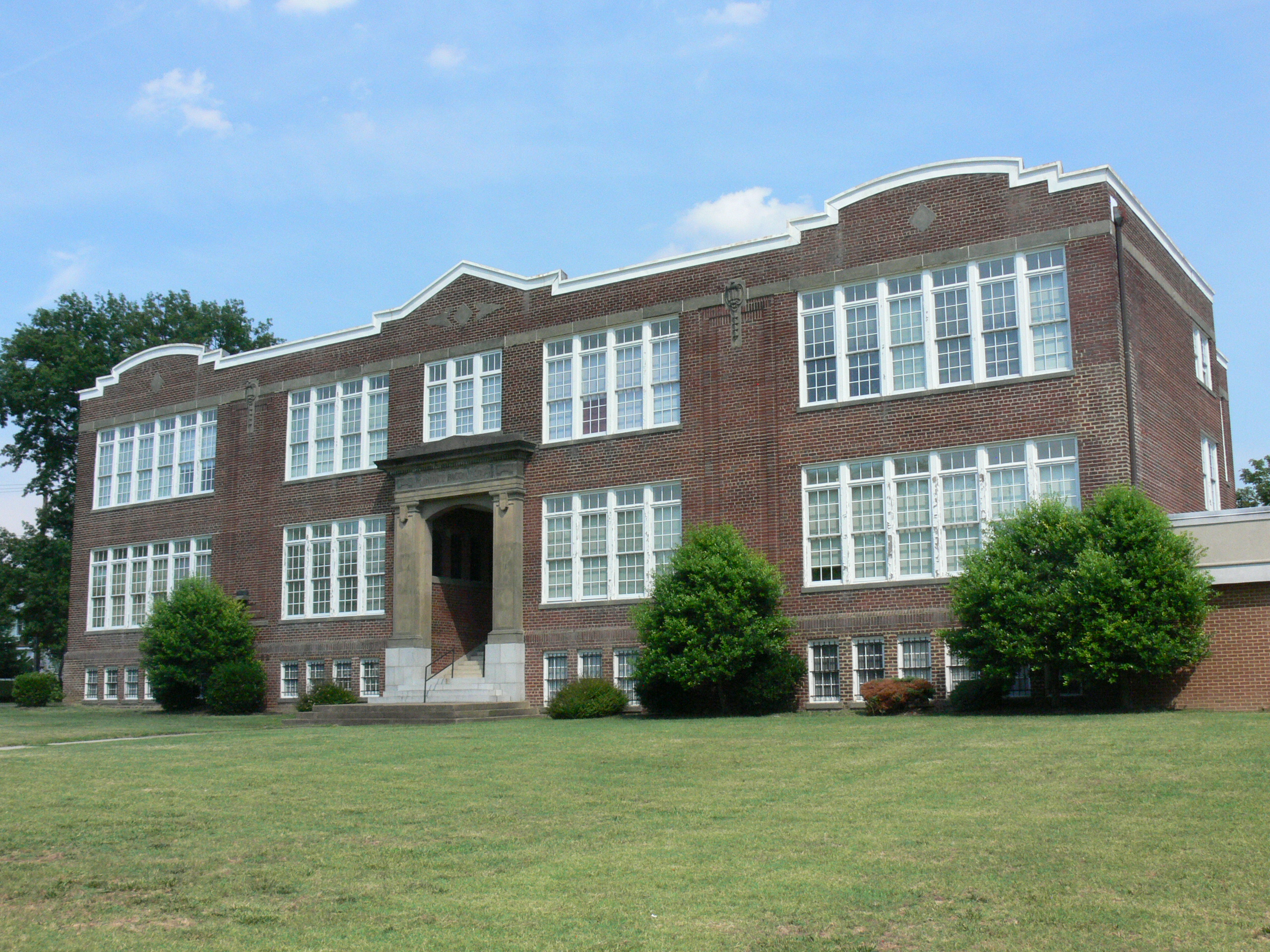

- Location within Virginia Location within the United States
- Location: 815 N. 35th St., Richmond, Virginia
- Coordinates: 37°31′51″N 77°24′17″W
- Area: 3.1 acres (1.3 ha)
- Built: 1914
- Architect: Charles M. Robinson; William L. Carneal
- Architectural style: Colonial Revival
- MPS: Public Schools of Richmond MPS
- NRHP reference No.: 92001031
- VLR No.: 127-0833

Significant dates
- Added to NRHP: August 24, 1992
- Designated VLR: December 11, 1991

Nathaniel Bacon School is a historic school building located in Richmond, Virginia. The structure was built in 1914 based on a design by Charles M. Robinson, supervising architect, and William L. Carneal, architect. The Colonial Revival building is a 2 1/2-story brick structure located in Richmond's Oakwood/Chimborazo Historic District. The school was "a focal point of the Chimborazo neighborhood." The school was named for Nathaniel Bacon, the leader of Bacon's Rebellion. It served as an elementary school in the Richmond Public Schools from the time of its opening in 1915. In 1958, it was converted for use as a school for African-American students. In 1971, it was converted into a junior high school and renamed the East End Junior High School Annex. The building ceased operating as a school in the 1980s. It was listed on the National Register of Historic Places in 1992.
