= Grace Hospital (Richmond, Virginia) =

Historic hospital in Virginia, US

- U.S. National Register of Historic Places
- Virginia Landmarks Register
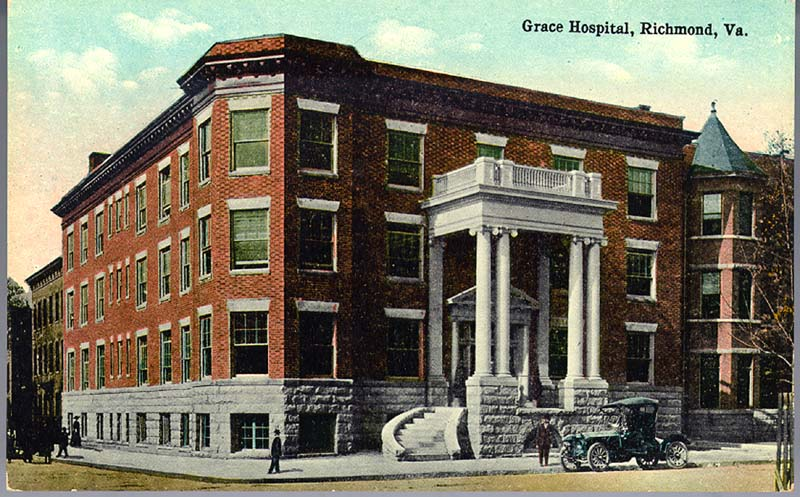
- Location: 401 West Grace St., Richmond, Virginia
- Coordinates: 37°32′55″N 77°26′48″W
- Area: 0.5 acres (0.20 ha)
- Built: 1911
- Architect: Charles M. Robinson; Henry E. Baskervill
- Architectural style: Colonial Revival, Moderne
- NRHP reference No.: 04000856
- VLR No.: 127-5459

Significant dates
- Added to NRHP: August 11, 2004
- Designated VLR: June 16, 2004

Grace Hospital is an American historic hospital in Richmond, Virginia. The original Colonial Revival structure was built in 1911 based on a design by noted Virginia architect Charles M. Robinson. The hospital is located to the west of Richmond's central business district and was substantially expanded by additions in 1930 and 1964. The original three-story main structure with an entrance pavilion on West Grace Street, is a Colonial Revival building with paired Ionic order columns and gauged arches. In 1930, a five-story Moderne style addition was built to the south along Monroe Street. In 1964, a further three-story addition was built along Grace Street. The 1964 addition is devoid of ornamentation, and the west wing "projects a modern, utilitarian character."

The hospital building was listed on the National Register of Historic Places in 2004. It was the birthplace in 1951 of Donnie Corker.

The building was renovated and turned into an apartment building from 2015 to 2017.
