= Peabody Building of the Peabody-Williams School =

- U.S. National Register of Historic Places
- Virginia Landmarks Register
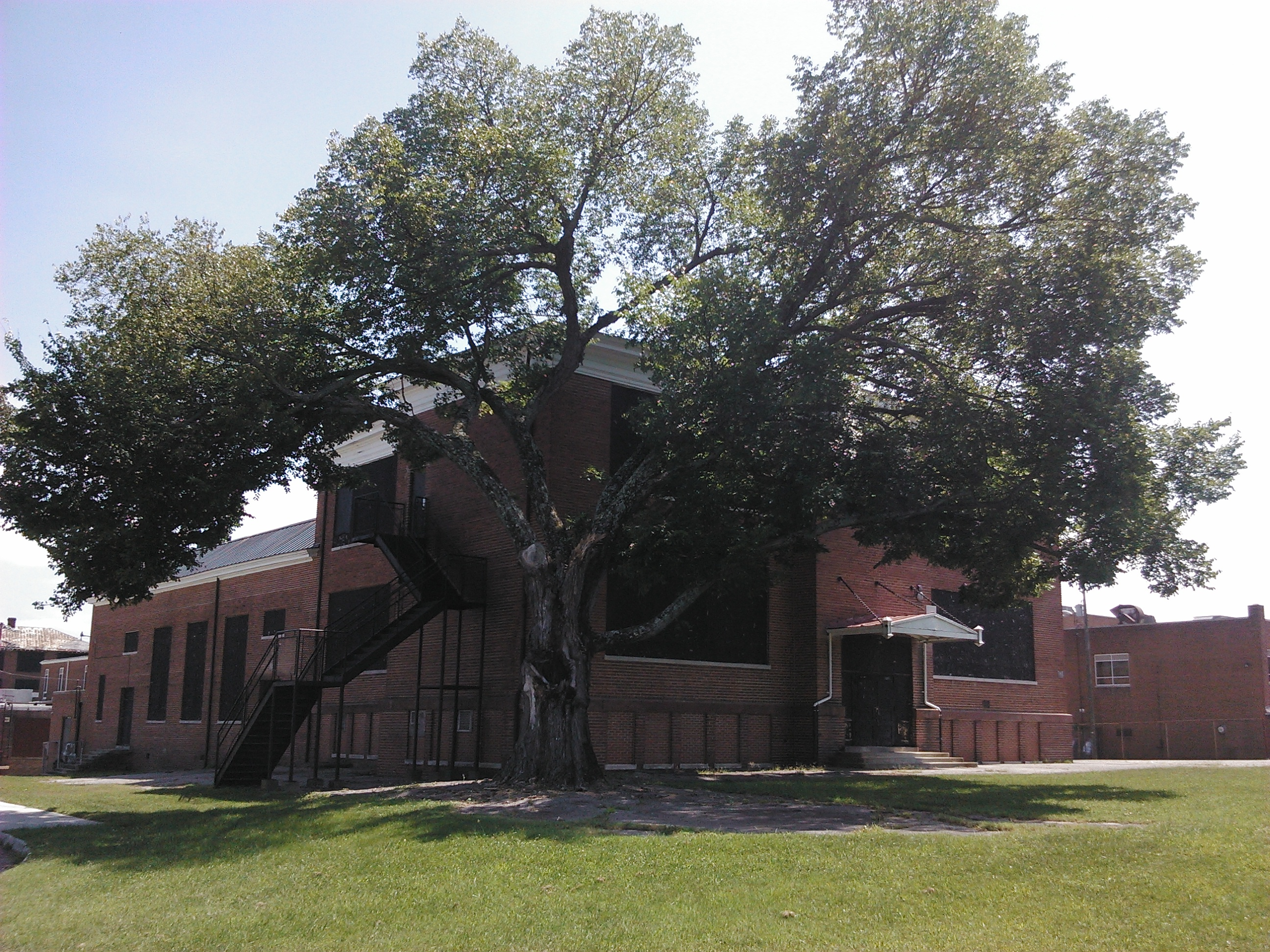
- Peabody Building of the Peabody-Williams School, Jones St. Petersburg, next to new Peabody Middle School

- Location within Virginia Location within the United States
- Location: Jones St., Petersburg, Virginia
- Coordinates: 37°13′23″N 77°24′25″W
- Area: less than one acre
- Built: 1920
- Architect: Charles M. Robinson
- NRHP reference No.: 00000891
- VLR No.: 123-5019

Significant dates
- Added to NRHP: August 2, 2000
- Designated VLR: June 14, 2000

Peabody Building of the Peabody-Williams School is an American historic school building located in Petersburg, Virginia. The structure opened in 1920 as a public high school for African American students in Petersburg's segregated public school system. The building was designed by noted Virginia architect Charles M. Robinson. It is a two-story, red brick building that was originally part of a campus that included a junior high school and an elementary school.

The building was listed on the National Register of Historic Places in 2000, but is now closed. A new middle school was built adjacent to it, and remains in use.
