= Newport News Public Library =

Historic library in Virginia, US

- U.S. National Register of Historic Places
- Virginia Landmarks Register
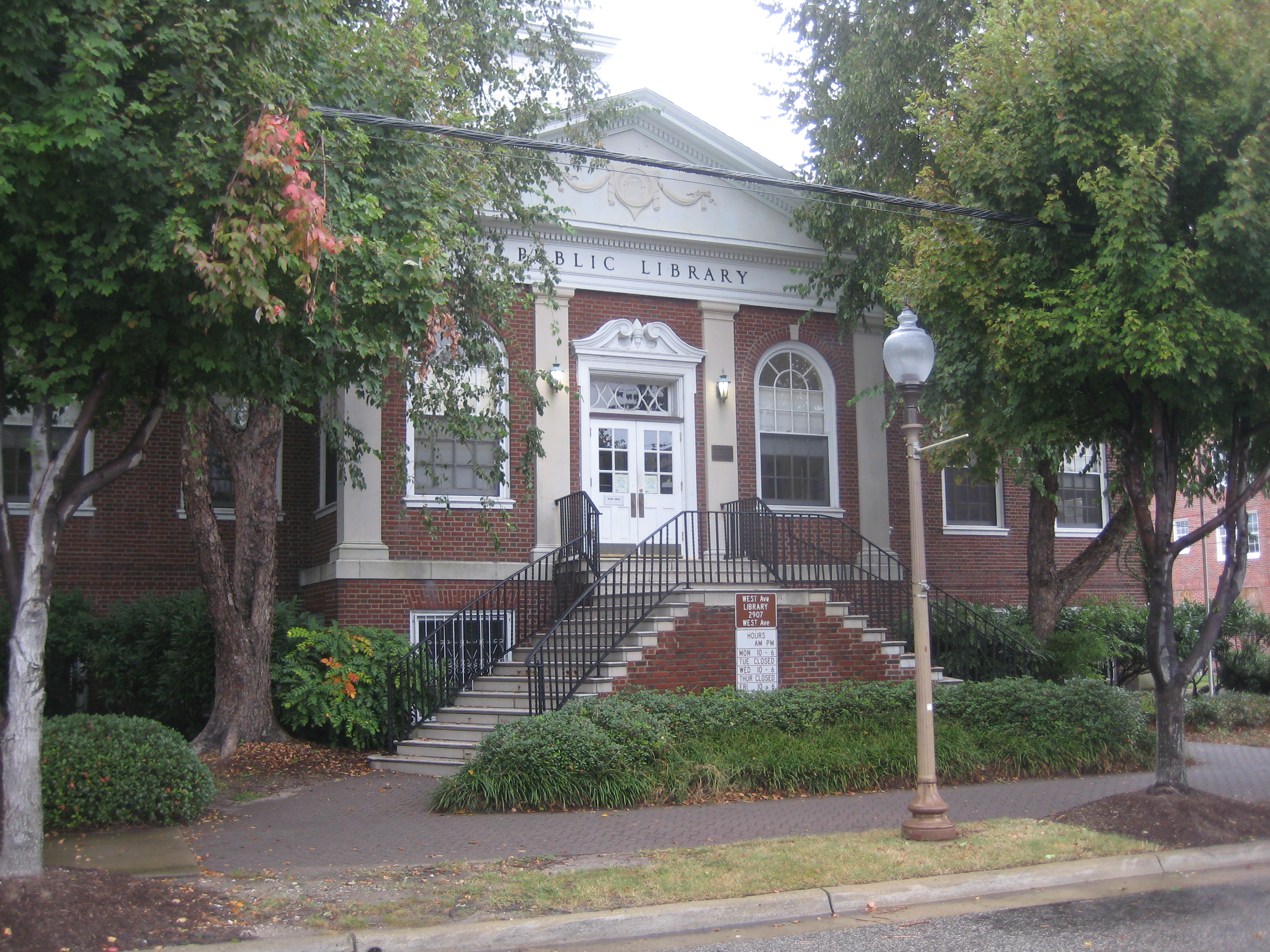

- Location within Virginia Location within the United States
- Location: 2907 West Ave., Newport News, Virginia
- Coordinates: 36°58′55″N 76°26′4″W
- Area: 0.2 acres (0.081 ha)
- Built: 1929
- Architect: Charles Morrison Robinson
- Architectural style: Colonial Revival
- NRHP reference No.: 05000894
- VLR No.: 121-0080

Significant dates
- Added to NRHP: August 17, 2005
- Designated VLR: June 1, 2005

The first Newport News Public Library, renamed West Avenue Library, now NNPLS Technical Services, in the Newport News Public Library System, was opened on October 14, 1929 at the corner of West Avenue and 30th Street in the City of Newport News, Virginia. This building was the first to be built in Newport News for the express purpose of being a library. In 2005, the West Avenue Library was placed onto the Virginia Landmarks Register and the National Register of Historic Places under its original name of Newport News Public Library. The building now known as West Avenue Library; however it is no longer a functioning library.

== History ==
In January 1891 the Subscription Library Association, started by a group of young business professionals, created the first Newport News Library System. The books were housed at the offices of W. I. Fitzsimmons, at the corner of Washington Avenue and 27th Street. The subscription-fee-based library gained more solid financial ground in 1914 when the Library Association Board decided to charge a fee of fifty cents per year for all library users. Also in 1914 the Newport News Shipyard agreed to donate $20 per month to support the cause of literacy. In 1917 the City began to support the library with $10 per month. This was the beginning of a private-public partnership that remained until 1968.

On July 6, 1927 the Commonwealth of Virginia issued the charter of incorporation to a new library group calling for 21 board members who called themselves the Newport News Public Library, Inc., and within six months they had taken over all the assets of the old Newport News Library Association. A new library building to replace the inadequate structure on 26th Street where the library was temporarily housed was a primary goal. A building committee was formed and within two years the groundbreaking ceremony was held on February 12, 1929. The cornerstone for the new library was then laid on April 11, 1929 with a ceremony featuring Homer L. Ferguson, President of the Newport News Shipbuilding and Drydock Company, as the keynote speaker. Between the formation of the building committee and the groundbreaking ceremony the people of Newport News showed their approval by a 2,285 to 827 vote of approval for the issuance of $45,000 in bonds for the City Council to pay for it. The Library Board contributed $6,200 and a book collection valued at $30,000.00. The Old Dominion Land Company, the business which planned and built the infrastructure for the City of Newport News, donated land valued at $12,000. Newport News Public Library was officially opened on October 14, 1929. It was the first building in Newport News built for the purpose of being a library.

Over the years the Newport News Public Library Building has been maintained and upgraded. In 1946 the basement of the library was converted into a Children's Library. In 1954 the roof over the north reading room was replaced. On May 2, 1957 a new mural was added to the wall facing the entryway into the library building. The Mural depicted the landing of Captain Christopher Newport at Jamestown. The mural was painted by the artist Allen D. Jones, Jr. in commemoration of the Three Hundred and Fiftieth Anniversary of the founding of Jamestown. Also in 1957 a new heating and air conditioning system and lights were installed and the rear stack area was remodeled. In 1968 there was a major change in the administration of the Newport News Public Library. In this year administration of the library was transferred from Newport News Public Library, Inc. to the City of Newport News. In 1986 and 1987 the building was rehabilitated.

== Architect ==
The architect of the Newport News Public Library building, Charles M. Robinson was a very prominent Richmond, Virginia architect. Robinson was a well known designer of educational buildings and supervising architect of the Richmond Board of Public Instruction from 1910-1929. He designed the campuses of James Madison and Radford Universities in 1908 and 1913 respectively. Robinson created the master plan in 1925 for and designed many of the buildings for the College of William and Mary. Robinson was the architect for at least ten buildings, which are currently listed on the Virginia Landmarks Register and the National Register of Historic Places.

== Desegregation of the Library ==
On May 9, 1949, W. Hale Thompson, a local African-American attorney, went before the Newport News City Council and proposed that the Newport News Public Library be opened to persons of all races. This request was rejected by the board of Newport News Public Library, Inc. but they opened an African American Library in a room in the Doris Miller Center, which was known as the Negro Recreation Building.

Mr. Thompson filed suit in the United States District Court for the Eastern District of Virginia against both the City and the Library Board. The case dragged on through the remainder of 1950 and 1951 with numerous postponements, until Judge Sterling Hutcheson scheduled the case to be argued before a jury on July 10, 1952. On July 8, 1952, two days before the trial was to begin, the board of directors of Newport News Public Library, Inc. issued a statement: "The Board of Directors of the Newport News Public Library, Inc. has now has announced that the facilities of its main reading rooms in the library at 30th Street and West Avenue are now available to all adult inhabitants of the City of Newport News." The Newport News Public Library was now open to African Americans and Judge Hutcheson dismissed the court case on July 18, 1952.

== Special Collections ==
The Martha Woodroof Hiden Memorial Collection was first dedicated on May 27, 1976 and was housed in the West Avenue Library of the Newport News Public Library System. The collection was named after longtime Chair of the Board of Trustees of the Newport News Public Library Inc. Mrs. Hiden served as Chair of the Board of Trustees from 1927 to 1952. She was well known in genealogy circles and was herself instrumental in the preservation of Virginia County Records.

The Martha Woodroof Hiden Memorial Collection contains the local and family history materials for the City of Newport News, Virginia. The collection resides in the Virginiana Room in the Main Street Library of the Newport News Public Library System. The primary purpose of the Martha Woodroof Hiden Memorial Collection is to serve as the main clearinghouse for family and local history of the City of Newport News, Virginia, including the extinct County and City of Warwick. Additionally, it is the purpose of the collection to preserve and provide access to materials of local historic significance to the public.

The Martha Woodroof Hiden Memorial Collection contains a wealth of information on the history of the City of Newport News, Warwick County and of the Commonwealth of Virginia in general. A portion of the main holdings include Newport News City Directories from 1898 to the present, high school annuals, photographs, maps, the local newspaper The Daily Press on microfilm from 1896 to the present, a collection of over five thousand books and journals as well as many other notable materials.

The prized collection of the Martha Woodroof Hiden Collection is the papers and maps from the Old Dominion Land Company. The Company was created by railroad magnate Collis Potter Huntington and his associates in 1880. The purpose of the company was to purchase, hold and develop land needed for the extension of the Chesapeake and Ohio Railway line from Richmond, Virginia to the port of Newport News. While fulfilling its mission, the Old Dominion Land Company planned and developed the original City of Newport News including street layout, utilities, reservoir system and sewer system. Also, the company played a major role in the development of the Newport News Shipbuilding and Dry Dock Company.

In 1996 When the Newport News Public Library System opened the Main Street Library the Martha Woodroof Hiden Collection was moved into a new climate controlled room in a new library building more centrally located. On April 14, 1996 the collection was re-dedicated at the Main Street Library where it currently resides.

In 2005, the building was placed on the Virginia Landmarks Register and the National Register of Historic Places.

== Technology ==
In 2013, the Newport News Public Library System installed 15 self-service kiosks to allow library patrons to search the library's Online Public Access Catalog (OPAC). The computer kiosks were installed at Pearl Bailey Library, Main Street Library, Virgil I. Grissom Library, and South Morrison Family Education Center. The kiosk hardware was integrated within the Newport News Public Library.
