= Charles Seymour Robinson =

American pastor and editor and compiler of hymns

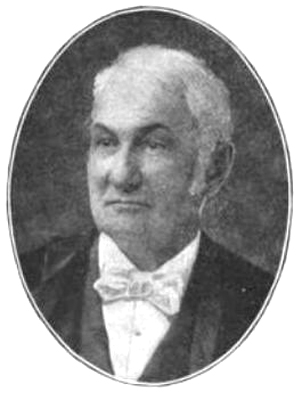
Charles Seymour Robinson.

Charles Seymour Robinson, D.D., LL.D., (March 31, 1829 – February 1, 1899), was a pastor, and an editor and compiler of hymns.

Born in Bennington, Vermont, Robinson graduated from Williams College in 1849, then spent a year and a half at Princeton Theological Seminary before entering the Union Theological Seminary in the City of New York, where he was afterward an instructor. He was ordained by the Presbytery of Troy, April 19, 1855, and was pastor of the Park Street (Presbyterian) church of Troy, New York from 1855 to 1860. He was then pastor of the First church of Brooklyn from 1860 to 1868, and of the American Chapel of Paris from 1868 to 1871. He then became pastor of the Memorial Presbyterian church, New York City, which was erected and freed from debt under his management.

Robinson, in 1876–1877 was editor of the Illustrated Christian Weekly, and compiled and published several successful hymn-books. The first was the Songs of the Church in 1862, revised as the Songs for the Sanctuary in 1865, which was "very widely adopted". Around the time of his return from Europe to New York City there was a demand for an additional work of a slightly different character which he met by issuing (through the Century Company) the book called Spiritual Songs, 1878. In 1884, Robinson published another hymn-book in the series, titled Laudes Domini. Robinson resigned his final pastorate in 1887, and died in his home, in New York City.
