= Charles Grey Robinson =

Royal Navy Admiral (1850–1934)

Charles Grey Robinson (12 November 1850 – 14 February 1934) was an Admiral in the Royal Navy.

He became a cadet in December 1864, on the Britannia, and was promoted to lieutenant in 1873, on the Royal Alfred. He became first lieutenant of the Vernon, the Navy's torpedo research station, in 1876. He was promoted to Commander in May 1887, commanding the Active, and to captain in 1890. In 1894 he became captain of the Boadicea, and from 1899 he was captain of the Vernon. From 1901 to 1903 he was an aide-de-camp to King Edward VII. He was made an admiral on 8 December 1903.

He was made a member of the Royal Victorian Order in 1907 and was awarded the Swedish Order of the Sword and the German Order of the Crown.

He married Mary Alice Hulseberg in 1899, and they had two daughters and one son, Charles, who also went into the navy. Robinson died in Surbiton on 15 February 1934.
