= Chaz Robinson (singer) =

American singer (born 1989)

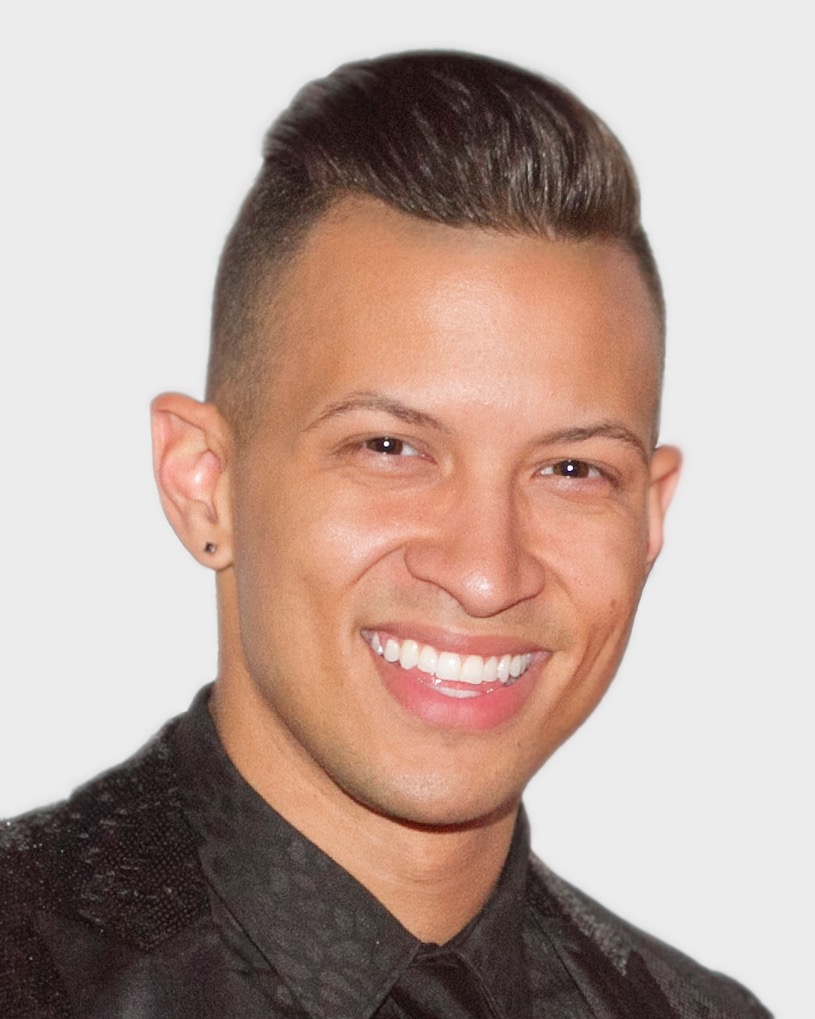
- Robinson at his Debut Album Release Party

Background information
- Born: Charles Leon Robinson II; December 20, 1989 (age 36)
- Origin: Indianapolis, Indiana, United States
- Genres: Pop; Jazz
- Occupations: Singer; Dancer; Model; Jump Roper; Actor
- Instruments: Vocals; Piano
- Label: Spectra Music Group
- Website: chazrobinson.com

Charles Leon Robinson II (born December 20, 1989), known professionally as Chaz Robinson, is an American singer, songwriter, record producer, model, and Jump Roper from Indianapolis. He has worked with Emmy Award-Winning choreographers, Tabitha and Napoleon D’Umo. On the 2015 Grammy Ballot, he received 2 nods for Best Pop Solo Performance.

== Discography ==
=== Songs ===
- Upside (2012)
- Love Will Come Back Again (2014)
- Trance (2014)
- Barrier of Sound (2016)
- Without You (2016)

=== Albums ===
- Chaz (2016)
- Rising Stars, Vol. 1 (2018)
- Love Is Love (2018)

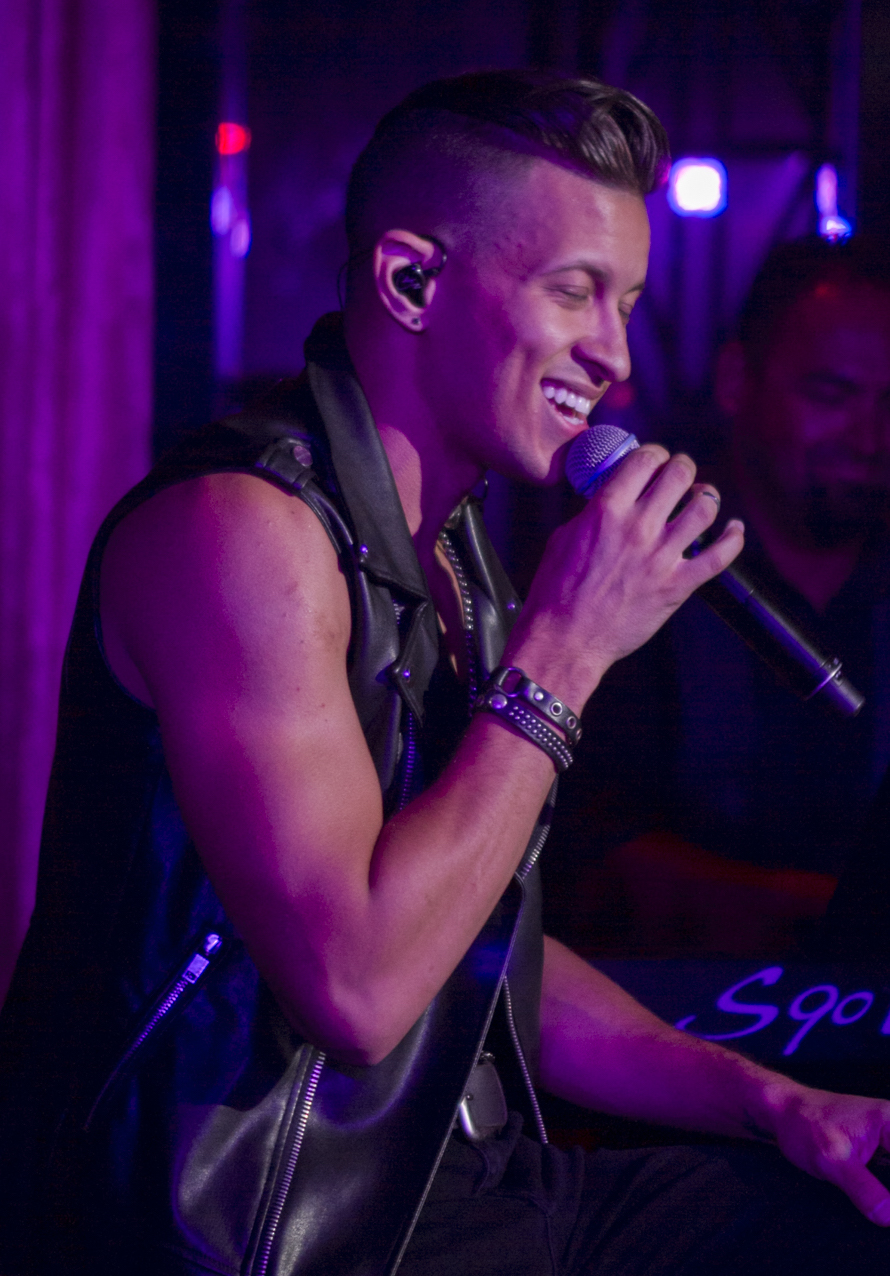
Robinson singing at his Debut Album Release Party

== TV appearances ==
- Disney's Shake It Up
- Broadway's Cirque Dreams Jungle Fantasy
- MTV's America's Best Dance Crew: Season 5
- MTV's Made
- The Ellen DeGeneres Show
- Le plus grand cabaret du monde
- Friday Zone
