= Carys Creek (Little Nottoway River tributary) =

American river

Carys Creek Tributary to the Little Nottoway River
- Location within Virginia

Location
- Country: United States
- State: Virginia
- County: Nottoway; Prince Edward

Physical characteristics
- Source: divide between Little Nottoway River and Sandy River (Appomattox River)
  - location: about 2 miles southwest of Burkeville, Virginia
  - coordinates: 37°10′38″N 078°14′33″W
  - elevation: 535 ft (163 m)
- Mouth: Little Nottoway River (confluence with Mallorys Creek)
  - location: about 2 miles southwest of Crewe, Virginia
  - coordinates: 37°08′30″N 078°08′57″W
  - elevation: 338 ft (103 m)
- Length: 7.06 mi (11.36 km)
- Basin size: 13.25 square miles (34.3 km^{2})
- Discharge
  - location: Little Nottoway River
  - average: 16.24 cu ft/s (0.460 m^{3}/s) at mouth with Little Nottoway River

Basin features
- Progression: Little Nottoway River → Nottoway River → Chowan River → Albemarle Sound
- River system: Nottoway River
- Tributaries
  - left: unnamed tributaries
  - right: unnamed tributaries
- Bridges: Cary Shop Road; Lone Pine Road; Lewiston Plank Road

Carys Creek is a 7.06 mi (11.36 km) long tributary to the Little Nottoway River in the United States state of Virginia. Located in the south-central part of the state, it is part of the larger Chowan-Albemarle drainage. The watershed is 74% forested and 25% agricultural with the rest of land as other uses. This stream joins with Carys Creek to form the Little Nottoway River.

== See also ==
- List of rivers of Virginia
