= Little Nottoway River =

Little Nottoway River Tributary to the Nottoway River
- Location within Virginia Location within the United States

Location
- Country: United States
- State: Virginia
- County: Nottoway

Physical characteristics
- Source: confluence of Mallorys Creek and Carys Creek
  - location: About 2 miles SSW of Crewe, Virginia
  - coordinates: 37°08′29″N 078°08′56″W
  - elevation: 340 ft (100 m)
- Mouth: Nottoway River
  - location: about 2 miles south of Blackstone, Virginia
  - coordinates: 37°01′20″N 078°00′17″W
  - elevation: 225 ft (69 m)
- Length: 14.31 mi (23.03 km)
- Basin size: 75.89 square miles (196.6 km^{2})
- Discharge
  - average: 87.20 cu ft/s (2.469 m^{3}/s) at mouth with Nottoway River

Basin features
- Progression: Nottoway River → Chowan River → Albemarle Sound
- River system: Nottoway River
- Tributaries
  - left: Mallorys Creek; Lazaretto Creek; Jacks Branch
  - right: Carys Creek; Long Branch; Whetstone Creek; Horsepen Creek
- Waterbodies: Crystal Lake (Lazaretto Creek), Lake Amtoco (Horsepen Creek)
- Bridges: Virginia 40; Nottoway County Route 629, 603, and 626; Virginia 40

The Little Nottoway River, spanning 14.31 mi (23.03 km), is a tributary of the Nottoway River in Virginia, United States. Situated in the southeastern region of the state, it belongs to the larger Chowan-Albemarle drainage system.

== Course ==
The Little Nottoway River originates at the confluence of Carys Creek and Mallorys Creek within Virginia's Piedmont region, at an elevation of 340 feet. It flows southeastward for approximately 14.31 miles (23.03 km) before merging with the Nottoway River at an elevation of 225 feet. Not including its forming tributaries, four streams feed into it.

== Watershed ==
The Little Nottoway River watershed comprises approximately half forested areas and half open land.

=== Tributaries ===
Tributaries of Little Nottoway River (Nottoway River tributary)

Name, Bank	Watershed Area in Square Miles (km^{2})	Average Discharge	Mouth Coordinates	Mouth Elevation	Source Coordinates	Source Elevation	Remarks
Mouth	75.89 square miles (196.6 km^{2})	87.20 cu ft/s (2.469 m^{3}/s)	37°02′38″N 078°02′27″W	225 ft (69 m)	37°08′59″N 078°01′56″W	340 ft (100 m)	The Little Nottoway River rises at the confluence of Mallorys Creek and Carys Creek then flows southeast to meet the Nottoway River at Nottoway Lake.
Horsepen Creek, right bank	7.17 square miles (18.6 km^{2})	9.04 cu ft/s (0.256 m^{3}/s)	37°02′39″N 078°02′32″W	239 ft (73 m)	37°04′29″N 078°07′46″W	460 ft (140 m)	Horsepen Creek rises east of Winnie, Virginia and then flows southeasterly to meet the Little Nottoway River about 2 miles southwest of Blackstone, Virginia.
Jacks Branch, left bank	3.08 square miles (8.0 km^{2})	4.05 cu ft/s (0.115 m^{3}/s)	37°02′38″N 078°02′27″W	240 ft (73 m)	37°04′59″N 078°01′29″W	355 ft (108 m)	Jacks Branch rises about 0.25 miles east of Blackstone, Virginia then flows southwest to meet the Little Nottoway River about 2 miles southwest of Blackstone.
Whetstone Creek, right bank	10.54 square miles (27.3 km^{2})	13.14 cu ft/s (0.372 m^{3}/s)	37°05′06″N 078°02′57″W	259 ft (79 m)	37°06′20″N 078°09′33″W	510 ft (160 m)	Whetstone Creek rises on the divide between the Little Nottoway River and Nottoway River about 1.5 miles southwest of Martins Corner, Virginia. It then flows east to meet the Little Nottoway River about 2 miles northwest of Blackstone, Virginia. Whetstone Creek is the second largest (watershed area and discharge) tributary to the Little Nottoway River.
Long Branch, right bank	1.61 square miles (4.2 km^{2})	2.15 cu ft/s (0.061 m^{3}/s)	37°05′39″N 078°03′43″W	269 ft (82 m)	37°06′40″N 078°07′08″W	435 ft (133 m)	Long Branch rises about 0.25 miles southwest of Sneads Spring, Virginia on the divide between it and Whetstone Creek. It then flows southeast to meet the Little Nottoway River about 2 miles northwest of Blackstone, Virginia.
Lazaretto Creek, left bank	8.89 square miles (23.0 km^{2})	11.06 cu ft/s (0.313 m^{3}/s)	37°07′55″N 078°05′46″W	290 ft (88 m)	37°11′28″N 078°10′44″W	490 ft (150 m)	Lazaretto Creek rises on the divide between the Little Nottoway River and the Appomattox River by Piedmont State Hospital. It then flows southeast to meet the Little Nottoway River about 0.5 miles southwest of Nottoway Court House, Virginia. Crystal Lake is an impoundment of this creek.
Mallorys Creek, left bank	7.10 square miles (18.4 km^{2})	8.89 cu ft/s (0.252 m^{3}/s)	37°08′31″N 078°08′59″W	335 ft (102 m)	37°08′31″N 078°08′59″W	555 ft (169 m)	Mallorys Creek along with Carys Creek forms the Little Nottoway River. The confluence is located about 2 miles southwest of Crewe, Virginia.
Carys Creek, right bank	13.25 square miles (34.3 km^{2})	16.24 cu ft/s (0.460 m^{3}/s)	37°08′30″N 078°08′57″W	335 ft (102 m)	37°10′38″N 078°14′33″W	535 ft (163 m)	Carys Creek along with Mallorys Creek forms the Little Nottoway River. The confluence is located about 2 miles southwest of Crewe, Virginia. Carys Creek is the largest (watershed area and discharge) to the Little Nottoway River.

== River modifications ==
Crystal Lake on Lazaretto Creek is the only named impoundment in the watershed. Little Nottoway River enters the Nottoway River just upstream of Nottoway Reservoir.

== See also ==
- List of rivers of Virginia
