= Mallorys Creek (Little Nottoway River tributary) =

American river

Mallorys Creek Tributary to the Little Nottoway River
- Location within Virginia
- Etymology: name for family who settled on the creek

Location
- Country: United States
- State: Virginia
- County: Nottoway
- Town: Burkeville

Physical characteristics
- Source: divide between Little Nottoway River and Sandy River (Appomattox River)
  - location: Burkes Tavern, Virginia
  - coordinates: 37°08′31″N 078°08′59″W
  - elevation: 555 ft (169 m)
- Mouth: Little Nottoway River
  - location: about 2 miles southwest of Crewe, Virginia
  - coordinates: 37°08′31″N 078°08′59″W
  - elevation: 335 ft (102 m)
- Length: 6.13 mi (9.87 km)
- Basin size: 7.10 square miles (18.4 km^{2})
- Discharge
  - location: Little Nottoway River
  - average: 8.89 cu ft/s (0.252 m^{3}/s) at mouth with Little Nottoway River

Basin features
- Progression: Little Nottoway River → Nottoway River → Chowan River → Albemarle Sound
- River system: Nottoway River
- Tributaries
  - left: unnamed tributaries
  - right: unnamed tributaries
- Bridges: US 360; Lewiston Plank Road; Lone Pine Road

The Mallorys Creek is a 7.10 mi (11.43 km) long tributary to the Little Nottoway River in the United States state of Virginia. Located in the south-central part of the state, it is part of the larger Chowan-Albemarle drainage. The watershed is 54% forested and 39% agricultural with the rest of land as other uses. This stream joins with Carys Creek to form the Little Nottoway River.

== See also ==
- List of rivers of Virginia
