= Long Branch (Little Nottoway River tributary) =

Long Branch Tributary to the Little Nottoway River
- Location within Virginia

Location
- Country: United States
- State: Virginia
- County: Nottoway

Physical characteristics
- Source
  - location: about 0.25 miles southwest of Sneads Spring, Virginia
  - coordinates: 37°06′40″N 078°07′08″W
  - elevation: 435 ft (133 m)
- Mouth: Little Nottoway River
  - location: about 2 miles northwest of Blackstone, Virginia
  - coordinates: 37°05′39″N 078°03′43″W
  - elevation: 269 ft (82 m)
- Length: 3.44 mi (5.54 km)
- Basin size: 1.61 square miles (4.2 km^{2})
- Discharge
  - average: 2.15 cu ft/s (0.061 m^{3}/s) at mouth with Little Nottoway River

Basin features
- Progression: Little Nottoway River → Nottoway River → Chowan River → Albemarle Sound
- River system: Nottoway River
- Tributaries
  - left: unnamed tributaries
  - right: unnamed tributaries
- Bridges: Snead Spring Road; Flat Rock Road

The Long Branch is a 3.44 mi (5.54 km) long tributary to the Little Nottoway River in the United States state of Virginia. Located in the southeastern part of the state, it is part of the larger Chowan-Albemarle drainage. The watershed is 58% forested and 38% agricultural with the rest of land as other uses.

== See also ==
- List of rivers of Virginia
