= Lazaretto Creek (Little Nottoway River tributary) =

American river

Lazaretto Creek Tributary to the Little Nottoway River
- Location within Virginia
- Etymology: Old Spanish word for prison

Location
- Country: United States
- State: Virginia
- County: Nottoway

Physical characteristics
- Source
  - location: by Piedmont State Hospital, about 2 miles northeast of Burkeville, Virginia
  - coordinates: 37°11′28″N 078°10′44″W
  - elevation: 490 ft (150 m)
- Mouth: Little Nottoway River
  - location: about 0.5 miles southwest of Nottoway Court House, Virginia
  - coordinates: 37°07′55″N 078°05′46″W
  - elevation: 290 ft (88 m)
- Length: 8.03 mi (12.92 km)
- Basin size: 8.89 square miles (23.0 km^{2})
- Discharge
  - location: Little Nottoway River
  - average: 11.06 cu ft/s (0.313 m^{3}/s) at mouth with Little Nottoway River

Basin features
- Progression: Little Nottoway River → Nottoway River → Chowan River → Albemarle Sound
- River system: Nottoway River
- Tributaries
  - left: unnamed tributaries
  - right: unnamed tributaries
- Waterbodies: Crystal Lake
- Bridges: US 460; Rocky Ford Road; Lone Pine Road; The Falls Road; Bible Road

Lazaretto Creek is a 8.89 mi (14.31 km) long tributary to the Little Nottoway River in the United States state of Virginia. Located in the south-central part of the state, it is part of the larger Chowan-Albemarle drainage. The watershed is 51% forested and 39% agricultural with the rest of land as other uses.

== See also ==
- List of rivers of Virginia
