= Inverness (disambiguation) =

Inverness is a city in the Highland Council area of Scotland.

Inverness may also refer to:

== Places ==
=== Australia ===
- Inverness, Queensland, a locality in the Shire of Livingstone

=== Canada ===
- Inverness, Nova Scotia
- Inverness, Quebec
- Inverness County, Nova Scotia
- Inverness (federal electoral district), Nova Scotia
- Inverness (provincial electoral district), Nova Scotia

=== Scotland ===
- Inverness (Scottish district), a local government district 1975 to 1996
- Lieutenancy of Inverness
- Inverness-shire Constabulary (1840 to 1968)
- Inverness Constabulary (1968 to 1975)
- Inverness Burghs (UK Parliament constituency) (1708 to 1918)
- Inverness (Parliament of Scotland constituency), pre-1707
- Inverness (UK Parliament constituency) (1918 to 1983)

=== Sweden ===
- Inverness, Sweden

=== United States ===
- Inverness, Bullock County, Alabama
- Inverness, Shelby County, Alabama
- Inverness, California
- Inverness, Colorado
- Inverness, Florida
- Inverness, Illinois
- Inverness, Indiana
- Inverness Township, Michigan
- Inverness, Mississippi
- Inverness, Montana
- Inverness Club, a golf club and course in Toledo, Ohio
- Inverness (Burkeville, Virginia), a historic house and national historic district

=== Extraterrestrial ===
- Inverness Corona, on Uranus's moon Miranda

== Other ==
- "Inverness", the name of Macbeth's castle in the play Macbeth by William Shakespeare
- Inverness Caledonian Thistle, a football team based in the city of Inverness, Scotland
- Inverness cape, an article of clothing associated with the fictional character, Sherlock Holmes
- list of ships named Inverness

== See also ==
- Inverness-shire (disambiguation)
