= Whetstone Creek (Little Nottoway River tributary) =

Whetstone Creek Tributary to Little Nottoway River
- Location within Virginia

Location
- Country: United States
- State: Virginia
- County: Nottoway

Physical characteristics
- Source
  - location: about 1.5 miles southwest of Martins Corner, Virginia
  - coordinates: 37°06′20″N 078°09′33″W
  - elevation: 510 ft (160 m)
- Mouth: Little Nottoway River
  - location: about 2 miles northwest of Blackstone, Virginia
  - coordinates: 37°05′06″N 078°02′57″W
  - elevation: 259 ft (79 m)
- Length: 8.03 mi (12.92 km)
- Basin size: 10.54 square miles (27.3 km^{2})
- Discharge
  - average: 13.14 cu ft/s (0.372 m^{3}/s) at mouth with Little Nottoway River

Basin features
- Progression: Little Nottoway River → Nottoway River → Chowan River → Albemarle Sound
- River system: Nottoway River
- Tributaries
  - left: unnamed tributaries
  - right: unnamed tributaries
- Bridges: The Falls Road (VA 49); Snead Spring Road; Flat Rock Road; The Grove Road

The Whetstone Creek is a 10.54 mi (16.96 km) long tributary to the Little Nottoway River in the United States state of Virginia. Located in the southeastern part of the state, it is part of the larger Chowan-Albemarle drainage. The watershed is 65% forested and 32% agricultural with the rest of land as other uses.

== See also ==
- List of rivers of Virginia
