= Horsepen Creek (Little Nottoway River tributary) =

American river

Horsepen Creek Tributary to the Little Nottoway River
- Location of Horsepen Creek mouth with Little Nottoway River Horsepen Creek (Little Nottoway River tributary) (the United States)

Location
- Country: United States
- State: Virginia
- County: Nottoway

Physical characteristics
- Source: divide between Horsepen Creek and Nottoway River
  - location: about 0.1 miles east of Winnie, Virginia
  - coordinates: 37°04′29″N 078°07′46″W
  - elevation: 460 ft (140 m)
- Mouth: Little Nottoway River
  - location: about 2 miles southwest of Blackstone, Virginia
  - coordinates: 37°02′39″N 078°02′32″W
  - elevation: 239 ft (73 m)
- Length: 6.56 mi (10.56 km)
- Basin size: 7.17 square miles (18.6 km^{2})
- Discharge
  - location: Little Nottoway River
  - average: 9.04 cu ft/s (0.256 m^{3}/s) at mouth with Little Nottoway River

Basin features
- Progression: Little Nottoway River → Nottoway River → Chowan River → Albemarle Sound
- River system: Nottoway River
- Tributaries
  - left: unnamed tributaries
  - right: unnamed tributaries
- Waterbodies: Lake Amtoco
- Bridges: Doswell Road

Horsepen Creek is a 6.56 mi (10.56 km) long tributary to the Little Nottoway River in the United States state of Virginia. Located in the south-central part of the state, it is part of the larger Chowan-Albemarle drainage. The watershed is 66% forested and 32% agricultural with the rest of land as other uses.

== Course ==
Horsepen Creek rises about 0.1 miles east of Winnie, Virginia on the Nottoway River divide in Nottoway County. The creek then flows southeast and east through Lake Amtoco to meet the Little Nottoway River about 2 miles southwest of Blackstone.

== Watershed ==
Horsepen Creek drains 7.17 square miles (18.6 km^{2}) of area, receives about 45.6 in/year of precipitation, has a topographic wetness index of 404.31 and is about 76% forested.

== See also ==
- List of rivers of Virginia

== Additional images ==
Horsepen Creek (Little Nottoway River tributary) watershed
