= Jacks Branch (Little Nottoway River tributary) =

Jacks Branch Tributary to the Little Nottoway River
- Location within Virginia

Location
- Country: United States
- State: Virginia
- County: Nottoway
- Town: Blackstone

Physical characteristics
- Source
  - location: about 0.25 miles west of Blackstone, Virginia
  - coordinates: 37°04′59″N 078°01′29″W
  - elevation: 355 ft (108 m)
- Mouth: Little Nottoway River
  - location: about 2 miles southwest of Blackstone, Virginia
  - coordinates: 37°02′38″N 078°02′27″W
  - elevation: 240 ft (73 m)
- Length: 2.92 mi (4.70 km)
- Basin size: 3.08 square miles (8.0 km^{2})
- Discharge
  - average: 4.05 cu ft/s (0.115 m^{3}/s) at mouth with Little Nottoway River

Basin features
- Progression: Little Nottoway River → Nottoway River → Chowan River → Albemarle Sound
- River system: Nottoway River
- Tributaries
  - left: unnamed tributaries
  - right: unnamed tributaries
- Bridges: VA 626

The Jacks Branch is a 2.92 mi (4.70 km) long tributary to the Little Nottoway River in the United States state of Virginia. Located in the southeastern part of the state, it is part of the larger Chowan-Albemarle drainage. The watershed is 61% forested and 26% agricultural with the rest of land as other uses.

== See also ==
- List of rivers of Virginia
