= Horsepen Creek =

Horsepen Creek may refer to:

- Horsepen Creek (Little Nottoway River tributary), in Nottoway County, Virginia
- Horsepen Creek (Potomac River tributary), in Fairfax County, Virginia
- Horsepen Creek (Reedy Fork tributary), in Guilford County, North Carolina
- Horsepen Creek (Uwharrie River tributary), in Montgomery County, North Carolina
