= Piedmont Sanatorium =

Virginia tuberculosis treatment facility

Coordinates: 37.19458788771927°N 78.17819707867571°W

Piedmont Sanatorium was a rest home for tubercular African Americans in Burkeville, Virginia from 1917 to 1965. It was the first facility of its kind ever to be established in the United States. The Sanatorium later became the site of Piedmont Geriatric Hospital.

== Influence of tuberculosis ==
Tuberculosis was the leading cause of death in the early twentieth century, accounting for one out of every 10 deaths. Those infected with the disease were isolated from society in sanatoriums. These self-contained communities became known as "waiting rooms for death."

Piedmont Sanatorium was established circa 1917 in Burkeville, Virginia as a rest home for blacks suffering from tuberculosis. Concerns about the health of whites were what led to its construction.

== Segregation ==
In the 1910s, as increasing urbanization began bringing whites and blacks into closer contact, Virginia health officials started compiling evidence of the "Negro Health Problem" - high disease, death, and maternal and infant mortality rates among blacks. Hard physical labor along with poor diet and sanitation contributed to the problem. Disease flourished in the crowded black neighborhoods, where garbage piled up, sewage went untreated, and running water was often nonexistent.

Fearing that black child-care nurses, cooks, and laundresses might spread tuberculosis to white neighborhoods, the government began looking for ways to stamp out TB and other contagious diseases. At the time, the only treatment facilities for blacks were the Central State Hospital for Mental Diseases and the State Penitentiary.

The Negro Organization Society, a grassroots advocacy association in Virginia, initiated discussions with the State Board of Health, and particularly Agnes Randolph. Agnes Dillon Randolph, a lifelong political activist and charter member of the Virginia State Association of Nurses, became concerned about the situation. To strengthen her political influence, Randolph rose to the position of Executive Secretary of the Virginia Anti-Tuberculosis Association. She lobbied the General Assembly to establish a sanatorium for Negro tuberculosis patients - the first ever in the United States. Although some legislators were reluctant to try such an unprecedented idea, in 1916, the legislature granted her request.

The all-white Blue Ridge Sanatorium was established in 1920. The City of Charlottesville, Virginia actively sought to locate Blue Ridge within their community. Charlottesville paid $15,000 of the $32,000 required for the procurement of the property and funded Blue Ridge's water supply. Piedmont, in contrast, had to hire contractors to dig its well.

Blue Ridge patients enjoyed access to University of Virginia medical staff located in the same city. Piedmont patients, on the other hand, had to travel more than 50 miles to St. Phillips Hospital in Richmond, Virginia in the event of a non-tubercular medical emergency.

== Building site ==
Finding an acceptable site was difficult. The Board of Health placed ads across the state for a site where a "colored sanatorium" could be built. The first location considered was in Ivor, Virginia. Local whites fiercely protested the facility, as recorded in the Aug. 24, 1916 State Board of Health minutes:

While the negotiations [for the purchase of the property] were in progress, and before any papers were passed, a large number of protests began to come into the health department from citizens of Ivor, objecting seriously to the location of such an institution at that point. The Commissioner went down to Ivor and attempted to allay the feeling, without result. A number of the citizens had employed an attorney and a delegation bringing a large petition entered emphatic protest before the committee.

The Piedmont Sanatorium committee then visited a site in Lynchburg, Virginia but received an even harsher response. According to The Tuberculosis Experience of African-Americans in Virginia, "any idea of such purchase was immediately abandoned."

In 1917, the committee hired a real estate agent named Mr. Barnes to negotiate the purchase of a site in Burkeville, Virginia. This time, the committee asked a group of citizens from Burkeville to sign a statement which said that the sanatorium could be built there. Nonetheless, opposition emerged for a third time. An attorney named Mr. H.H. Watson wrote a letter to the committee on behalf of a group of citizens who opposed locating the sanatorium in Burkeville. Impatient with the delays, this time the State Board of Health ignored the opposition and began construction of Piedmont Sanatorium on a 300-acre (120 ha) parcel in Burkeville.

The Negro Organization Society continued to be heavily involved with the issue, from raising public awareness to donating funds to improve the facility. Bonds were issued "to erect and to equip one Building to be used for the patients and to include rooms for visiting Doctors who shall from time to time be invited for study to the Sanatorium."

== Daily life ==
According to Gertz, "everything at Piedmont was hierarchically organized and routine". Patients were awakened every morning at 7:15 a.m. for breakfast. They then rested until lunch, had quiet time from 1:45 until 4:00 p.m., ate supper at 6:00 p.m., and went to bed at 9:30 p.m. Some patients who were advanced in their treatment exercised at certain times of the day. An occupational therapist led the patients in handicraft activities. Some patients were taught skills that they could use upon returning to productive society.

Patients were required to attend weekly lectures on tuberculosis. They were taught the proper way to dispose of sputum and other aspects of dealing with the illness. Piedmont staff hoped that they would go back to their home communities and teach other blacks about tuberculosis.

== Piedmont Sanatorium School of Tuberculosis Nursing ==
Piedmont Sanatorium School of Tuberculosis Nursing, a two-year nursing school for black women, was founded shortly after the Sanatorium opened. It allowed the black women to become certified specifically in tuberculosis nursing; a third year of training at St. Phillips Hospital in Richmond was required in order to become a Registered Nurse. The school became the subject of controversy due to the hospital staffing shortages of World War II. In 1943, Virginia Governor Colgate W. Darden Jr. proposed having an all-black staff at Piedmont in order to free white personnel to work in white hospitals. The proposal failed, partly because of concerns that the quality of care at Piedmont would suffer.

== Closure ==
In 1965, in a visible sign that racial segregation was beginning to crumble, Piedmont Sanatorium closed and black patients were admitted to the previously all-white Blue Ridge Sanatorium. By 1967, the Burkeville facility had been converted into Piedmont Geriatric Hospital.
