= Mike Edwards (Scottish journalist) =

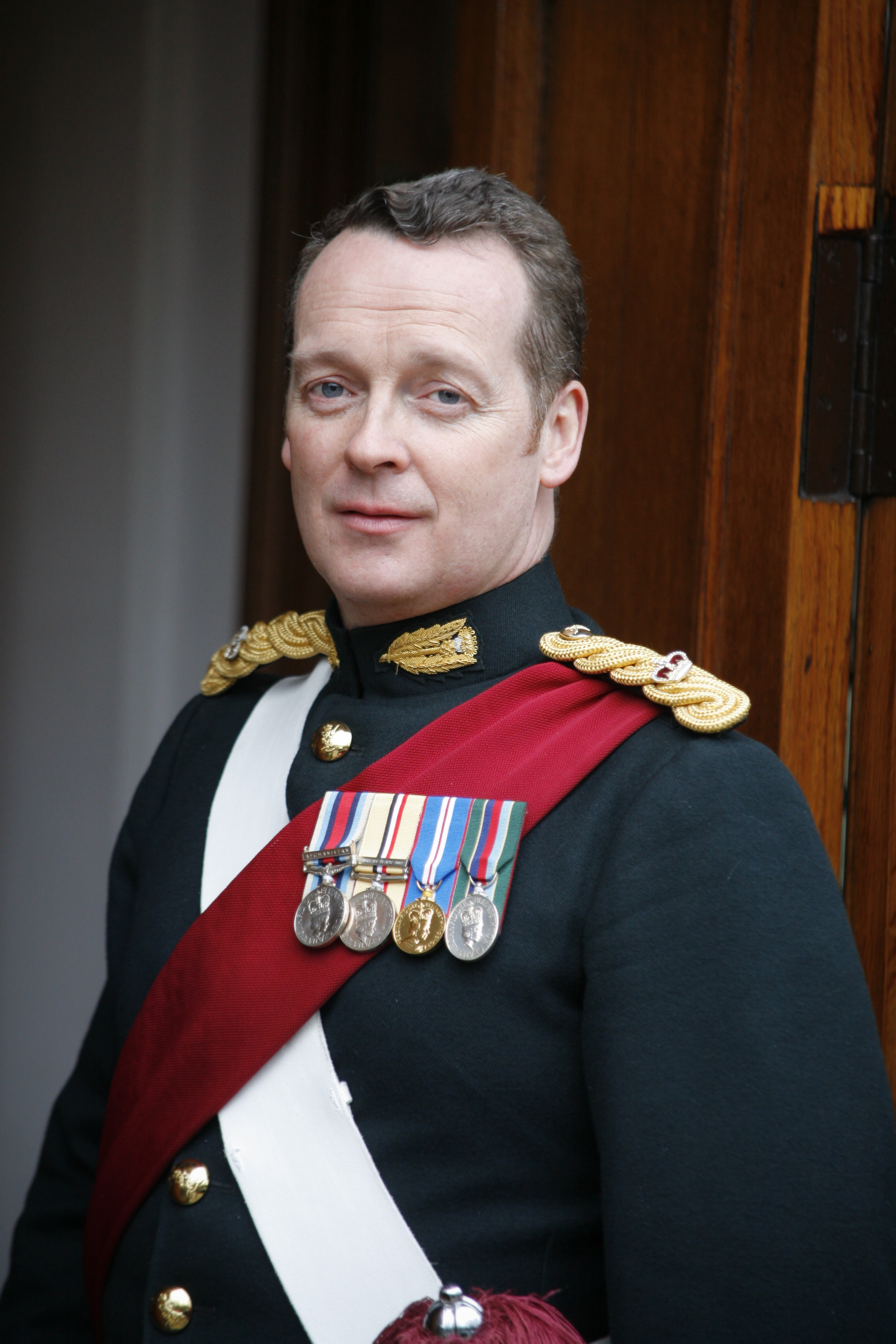
Mike Edwards has been an Army Reservist since 1994 and has served in Iraq & Afghanistan.

Michael Andrew Edwards OBE VR DL is a Scottish author, army reserve officer, charity trustee, dementia campaigner, retired journalist and Deputy Lord Lieutenant.

Mike Edwards was a journalist for 40 years, beginning his career as a trainee reporter for the Inverness Courier in 1986. He later switched to radio and worked for Radio Forth, Radio Tay and Moray Firth Radio before returning to press journalism as a sports correspondent for The Press and Journal in Inverness. Edwards was one of 120 journalists sacked for being a member of the National Union of Journalists and spent a year on the picket lines.

Shortly after his dismissal, Edwards moved to Switzerland and worked in Bern for the World Service of the Swiss Broadcasting Corporation covering the fall of the Iron Curtain, the Soviet Coup and the first Gulf War, before joining Scottish Television in 1993.

He is a major in the Army Reserve and was mobilised for active service in Iraq and Afghanistan where he came under repeated enemy fire. In Iraq his tour of duty ended when he reached Saddam Hussein's river palace in Basra. While in Kabul, he wrote his first novel Friendly Fire. The book was published in April 2006.

His second book, The Road Home, an autobiographical travelogue, was published in May 2018. It charts a coast to coast journey across the USA via five places named Inverness after his home town, interspersed with his life story as a journalist and soldier.

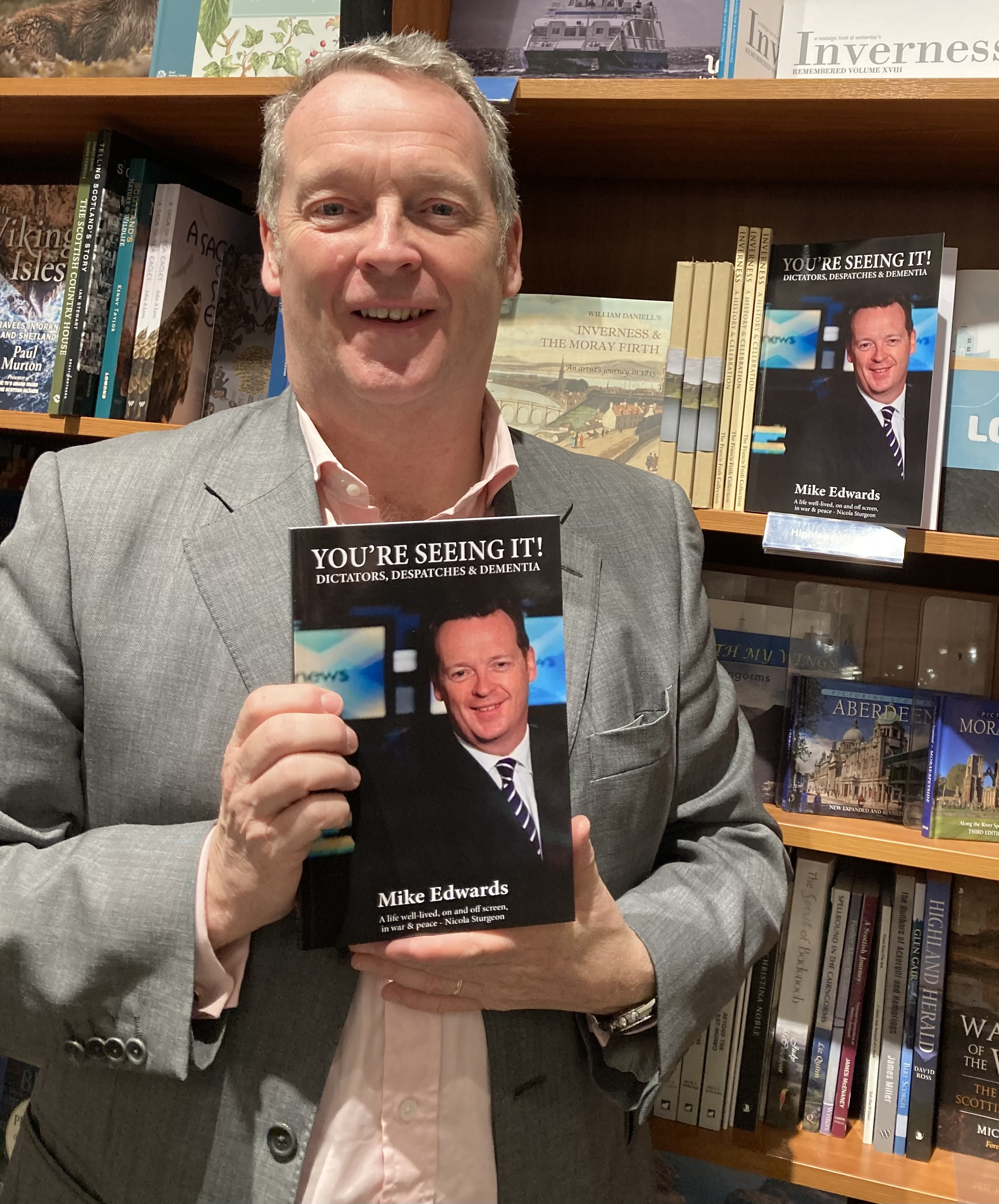
Mike Edwards at the launch of his third book, 'You're Seeing It!' in December 2022.

His third book, 'You're Seeing It!' is a volume of autobiography, which focuses on life as a journalist in Scotland, his service while mobilised for operational tours of duty in Iraq and Afghanistan as an Army Reserve officer and an account of life with his elderly mother Margaret, who was living with a diagnosis of dementia, after he took early retirement from STV to care for her. Proceeds from the book will go towards the setting up of a dementia charity which will campaign to have heading the ball banned from football.

He retired from journalism in 2019 after 26 years as a reporter with STV.

Margaret died in 2019 aged 91.

Since his retirement he has devoted his time to charity work, particularly to help military veterans and those living with dementia and their families.

He is a trustee of the military charity Erskine, Erskine (charity) the Highlanders museum at Fort George https://www.thehighlandersmuseum.com/, the Royal Highland Fusiliers trust and is a caseworker forhttps://en.wikipedia.org/wiki/Erskine_(charity) the service charity SSAFA https://www.ssafa.org.uk/

When Mike retired from journalism he became an ambassador and campaigner for Alzheimer Scotland https://www.alzscot.org/.

Mike is also a volunteer with Crimestoppers Scotland https://crimestoppers-uk.org/campaigns-media/community/Scotland.

Mike is a Trustee of Glasgow Humane Society

In June 2021, he was appointed Deputy Lord Lieutenant of Dunbartonshire.

In May 2022 he was named Reservist of the Year.

His hobbies are playing the guitar and following Inverness Caledonian Thistle FC.

He made a cameo appearance in the 100th episode of the STV crime drama Taggart on Christmas Eve 2009.

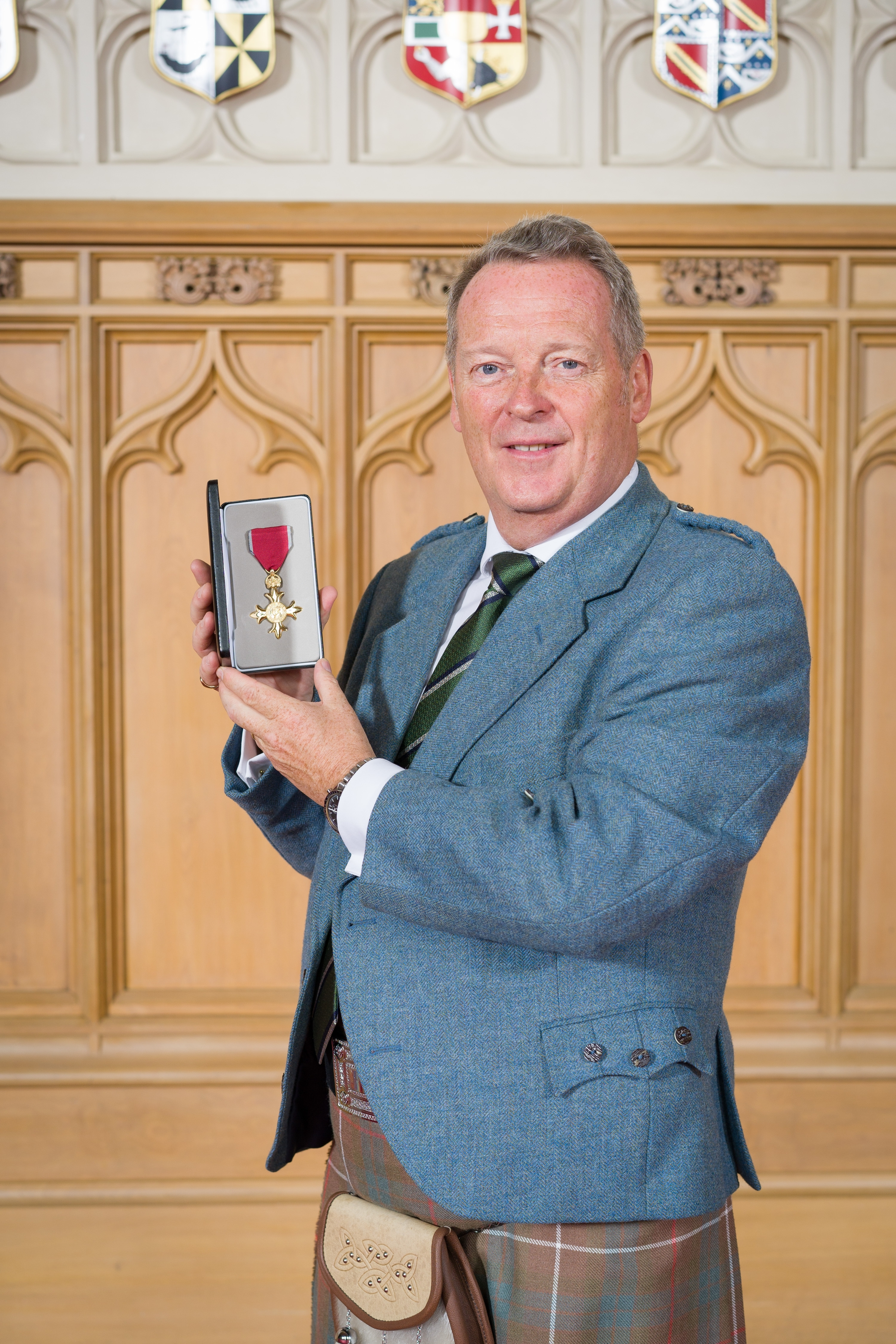
Mike Edwards received his OBE from the King in an investiture at Windsor Castle in July 2023.

Edwards was appointed Officer of the Order of the British Empire (OBE) in the 2022 Birthday Honours for public and charitable service in Scotland and received the honour from His Majesty King Charles III at an investiture in Windsor Castle in July 2023.

== Decorations and awards ==
Officer of the Order of the British Empire

Operational Service Medal Afghanistan

The Iraq War Medal

The Queen's Golden Jubilee Medal

The Queen's Diamond Jubilee Medal

The Queen's Platinum Jubilee Medal

The King's Coronation Medal

The Volunteer Reserves Service Medal and four clasps for 30 years service
