= Crewe, Virginia =

- Town
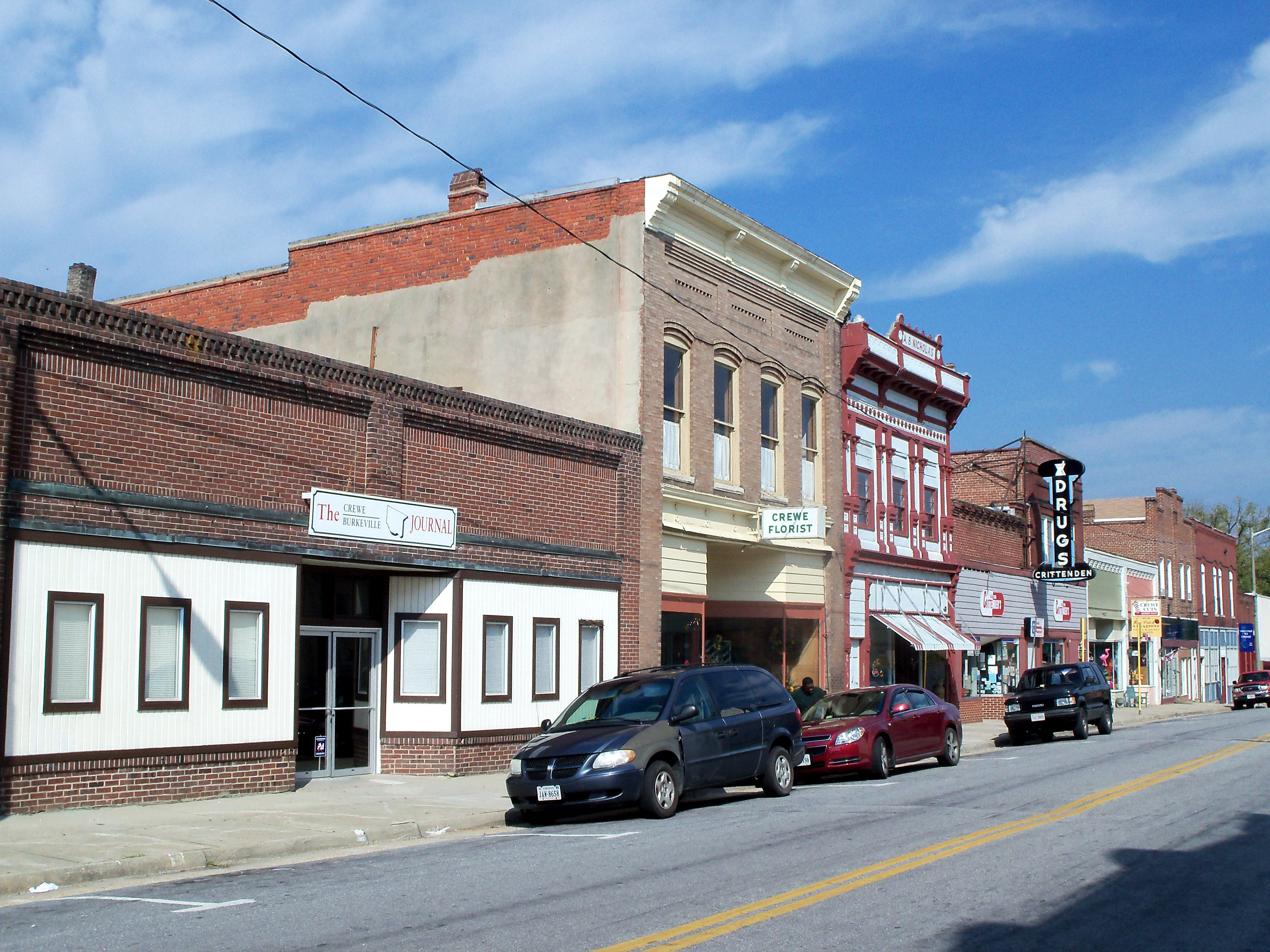
- Downtown Crewe

- Flag Seal

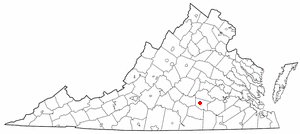
- Location of Crewe, Virginia
- Coordinates: 37°10′46″N 78°7′39″W
- Country: United States
- State: Virginia
- County: Nottoway

Government
  - Type: Local
  - Mayor: Brenda Payne
  - Town Manager: Phil Miskovic
  - Police Chief: James "Phil" Morgan
  - Fire Chief: Joey Schnepf

Area
  - Total: 2.02 sq mi (5.22 km^{2})
  - Land: 2.02 sq mi (5.22 km^{2})
  - Water: 0.0039 sq mi (0.01 km^{2})
- Elevation: 531 ft (162 m)

Population (2020)
  - Total: 2,262
  - Density: 1,123/sq mi (433.6/km^{2})
- Time zone: UTC−5 (Eastern (EST))
  - Summer (DST): UTC−4 (EDT)
- ZIP code: 23930
- Area code: 434
- FIPS code: 51-20160
- GNIS feature ID: 1492824
- Website: Official website

Crewe is a town in Nottoway County, Virginia, United States. The population was 2,262 at the 2020 census.

== History ==
Crewe was founded in 1888 as a central location to house steam locomotive repair shops for the Norfolk & Western Railroad (now called Norfolk Southern) which has a rail yard there for east–west trains carrying Appalachian coal to Hampton Roads for export abroad, and the street pattern was laid out at that time. It was named after the railway town of Crewe in Cheshire, England.

The railroad repair facility's importance diminished sharply in the 1950s, as the switch to diesel-electric locomotives required less labor and equipment. Crewe has a small railroad museum. Lottie Moon, a noted Baptist missionary to China, is buried in the town cemetery. A chicken festival is held annually on the third Wednesday in June, as well as the town Homecoming Celebration on the third weekend in May.

The Battle of Sayler's Creek, the last major Civil War engagement before the Army of Northern Virginia's surrender at Appomattox Court House, took place nearby. The Southside Electric Cooperative, Piedmont Geriatric Hospital, and Nottoway Correctional Center are located in Burkeville.

Millbrook and Mountain Hall are listed on the National Register of Historic Places. Screenwriter and short story writer Robert Buckner was born in the town.

== Economy ==
In recent years retail business in Crewe has declined. This decline is often attributed to the presence of big-box chain stores in nearby Blackstone and Farmville, Virginia. The Star Value grocery store in Crewe closed its doors in 2005, but later on a Dollar General was opened. In November 2005, the Virginia Department of Rail and Public Transportation provided emergency funding for a bus route between Crewe and Blackstone in order to provide access to the Walmart, Food Lion, and other shops in Blackstone to those without other means of transportation.

== Geography ==
Crewe is located at 37°10′46″N 78°7′39″W (37.179316, −78.127549).

According to the United States Census Bureau, the town has a total area of 2.0 square miles (5.2 km^{2}), all land.

== Demographics ==
Historical population
Census	Pop.	Note	%±
1890	887		—
1900	1,329		49.8%
1910	1,802		35.6%
1920	2,097		16.4%
1930	2,152		2.6%
1940	2,048		−4.8%
1950	2,030		−0.9%
1960	2,012		−0.9%
1970	1,797		−10.7%
1980	2,325		29.4%
1990	2,276		−2.1%
2000	2,378		4.5%
2010	2,326		−2.2%
2020	2,262		−2.8%
U.S. Decennial Census

As of the census of 2000, there were 2,378 people, 971 households, and 645 families residing in the town. The population density was 1,171.6 people per square mile (452.3/km^{2}). There were 1,074 housing units at an average density of 529.1 per square mile (204.3/km^{2}). The racial makeup of the town was 77.04% White, 21.15% African American, 0.34% Native American, 0.17% Asian, 0.08% Pacific Islander, 0.21% from other races, and 1.01% from two or more races. Hispanic or Latino of any race were 0.80% of the population.

There were 971 households, out of which 34.5% had children under the age of 18 living with them, 45.9% were married couples living together, 15.7% had a female householder with no husband present, and 33.5% were non-families. 28.7% of all households were made up of individuals, and 16.4% had someone living alone who was 65 years of age or older. The average household size was 2.45 and the average family size was 2.98.

In the town, the population was spread out, with 29.1% under the age of 18, 7.6% from 18 to 24, 26.2% from 25 to 44, 19.0% from 45 to 64, and 18.1% who were 65 years of age or older. The median age was 36 years. For every 100 females, there were 86.9 males. For every 100 females age 18 and over, there were 79.9 males.

The median income for a household in the town was $33,828, and the median income for a family was $40,625. Males had a median income of $35,350 versus $20,819 for females. The per capita income for the town was $16,826. About 14.6% of families and 16.5% of the population were below the poverty line, including 22.5% of those under age 18 and 9.7% of those age 65 or over.

The town has its own police department and a volunteer fire service. The town is also served by the Nottoway County Sheriff's Office.

== Attractions ==
The Crewe Railroad Museum, located at 125 Carolina Street, is housed in a former Norfolk & Western Railroad station (later Amtrak); it features a permanent model train layout, and a handful of rolling stock. The museum is open year-round.
