= Piedmont Geriatric Hospital =

Hospital in Virginia, United States

Coordinates: 37.1924°N 78.1751°W

Piedmont Geriatric Hospital is a geriatric hospital located in the state of Virginia. It is Virginia's only state facility solely dedicated to the evaluation and treatment of persons over the age of 65 . The 123-bed geriatric hospital is located in Burkeville on the 300-acre (120 ha) site of the former Piedmont Sanatorium. Founded in 1967, the facility employs 320 staff members and is a training site for major universities, colleges, and vocational schools in geropsychiatry and other clinical specialties.

== History ==
The 300-acre site of PGH was originally Piedmont Sanatorium, a rest home for African Americans with tuberculosis. The Sanatorium was closed in 1965 and converted into a geriatric hospital in 1967. In 1985, PGH was accredited by the Joint Commission on Accreditation of Healthcare Organizations.

In 1999, word leaked out that PGH was slated to be closed under the 1999–2000 budget of Governor George Allen. The Legislature voted to keep PGH open with funding allocated through 2000.

On November 25, 2000, the Richmond Times-Dispatch cited an administration leak that PGH would be closed by 2006. State Senator Frank Ruff speculated that the information was leaked on purpose in order to gauge the public's reaction. Local officials and the Piedmont Geriatric Association organized to oppose the closure, and the Legislature funded PGH for 2000.

In 2002, Governor Mark R. Warner proposed budget amendments to shut down PGH and Delegate Robert McDonnell introduced House Bill 995 to close Piedmont by 2007 . Nottoway Supervisor Jack Green called it the facility's most serious closure threat to date. He noted the state's desire to save money and the attractiveness of the hospital's 300 acre estate for other building projects. The bill passed after it was amended to eliminate the provision to "close Piedmont Geriatric Hospital, opened in 1967 and located in Burkeville, no earlier than July 1, 2007".

In 2004, the state Department of Mental Health, Mental Retardation and Substance Abuse proposed building a facility to house 150 of Virginia's most dangerous sex offenders on PGH grounds. The facility would be self-contained and not occupy the same buildings as PGH. Reasons for selecting the Burkeville site included its proximity to Nottoway Correctional Center, which could provide backup security help, and the nearby temporary sex offenders unit in Dinwiddie, whose workers could easily transition to the new facility.

The offenders in question fall under the control of the DMHMRS, rather than the prison system, because they have completed their prison sentences but still meet the criteria for civil commitment as sexually violent predators .

== Residents ==
PGH treats elderly persons (65+ years of age) who:

- Are in need of inpatient treatment for mental illness,
- Meet the requirements for voluntary or involuntary admission as determined by their mental health center, and
- Do not have a medical condition that requires priority treatment in an acute care hospital.

According to PGH's facility profile, "80-90% of PGH's admissions come from a complex combination of psychiatric and physical impairments whose needs are not met in traditional medical or psychiatric settings". Many hospital residents are transferred there because of complex behavior that nursing homes are not equipped to manage . Under Virginia law, patients must be transferred out of nursing homes if they :

- Present an imminent physical threat or danger to self or others,
- Require continuous licensed nursing care (seven-days-a-week, 24-hours-a-day), or
- Have other medical and functional care needs of residents that cannot properly be met in an assisted living facility.

== Services ==
=== Music therapy ===
Music therapy part of the Psychosocial-Rehabilitation Department.

Music therapy is the prescribed use of music and musical interventions in order to restore, maintain, and improve emotional, physical, physiological, and spiritual health and well-being. Music therapy works towards specific therapeutic goals and objectives. Goal areas include communicative, academic, motor, emotional, and social skills. It is important to be aware that while clients may develop their musical skills during treatment, these skills are not the primary concern of the therapist. Rather it is the effect such musical development might have on the client's physical, psychological and socio-economical functioning.

The credential Music Therapist - Board Certified (MT-BC) is granted by the Certification Board for Music Therapists (CBMT) to identify music therapists who have demonstrated the knowledge, skills and abilities necessary to practice music therapy at the current level of the profession. The purpose of board certification in music therapy is to provide an objective national standard that can be used as a measure of professionalism by interested agencies, groups, and individuals.

=== Psychology ===
The PGH Psychology Department provides evaluations and nonpharmacological interventions for all PGH patients. Evaluations provided include neurocognitive, emotional, personality, decision-making capacity, and forensic evaluations. Interventions include, among others, individual psychotherapy, group therapy, psychoeducational sessions, and behavior planning. PGH Psychologists are also active in hospital administration, program evaluation, performance improvement, and risk management activities. Hospital research efforts are also overseen by the Psychology Department.

The Psychology Department utilizes the most current techniques available in current research literature. Department staff serve as leaders within and outside of the hospital regarding current knowledge in mental health and behavioral research, and have developed many innovative protocols and methods to optimally serve their clientele. Psychology is also involved in clinical teaching, serving as a practicum site for local doctoral and masters level programs and offering frequent seminars for community eldercare providers through Piedmont Geriatric Institute.

PGH Psychology consists of four licensed clinical psychologists, one resident in clinical psychology, and an administrative assistant.

== Organization ==
=== Units ===
PGH's 123 residents are divided into four units of approximately 30 residents each. The staff for each unit consists of Registered Nurses, Licensed Practical Nurses, and Direct Service Associates.

=== Shifts ===
The staff are organized into day, evening, and night shifts. During the day shift, members of the physical, recreational, occupational, Psychology, and Music Therapy staff, as well as social workers and the Chaplain visit each unit. During the evening and night shifts, unit nursing coordinators and the house-nursing supervisor make rounds.

=== Inspectors ===
The facility is inspected routinely by the Office of the Inspector General. Unannounced reviews conducted between 1999 and 2004 consistently reported clean, comfortable, and well-maintained surroundings.
