= Millbrook (Crewe, Virginia) =

Historic house in Virginia, United States

- U.S. National Register of Historic Places
- Virginia Landmarks Register
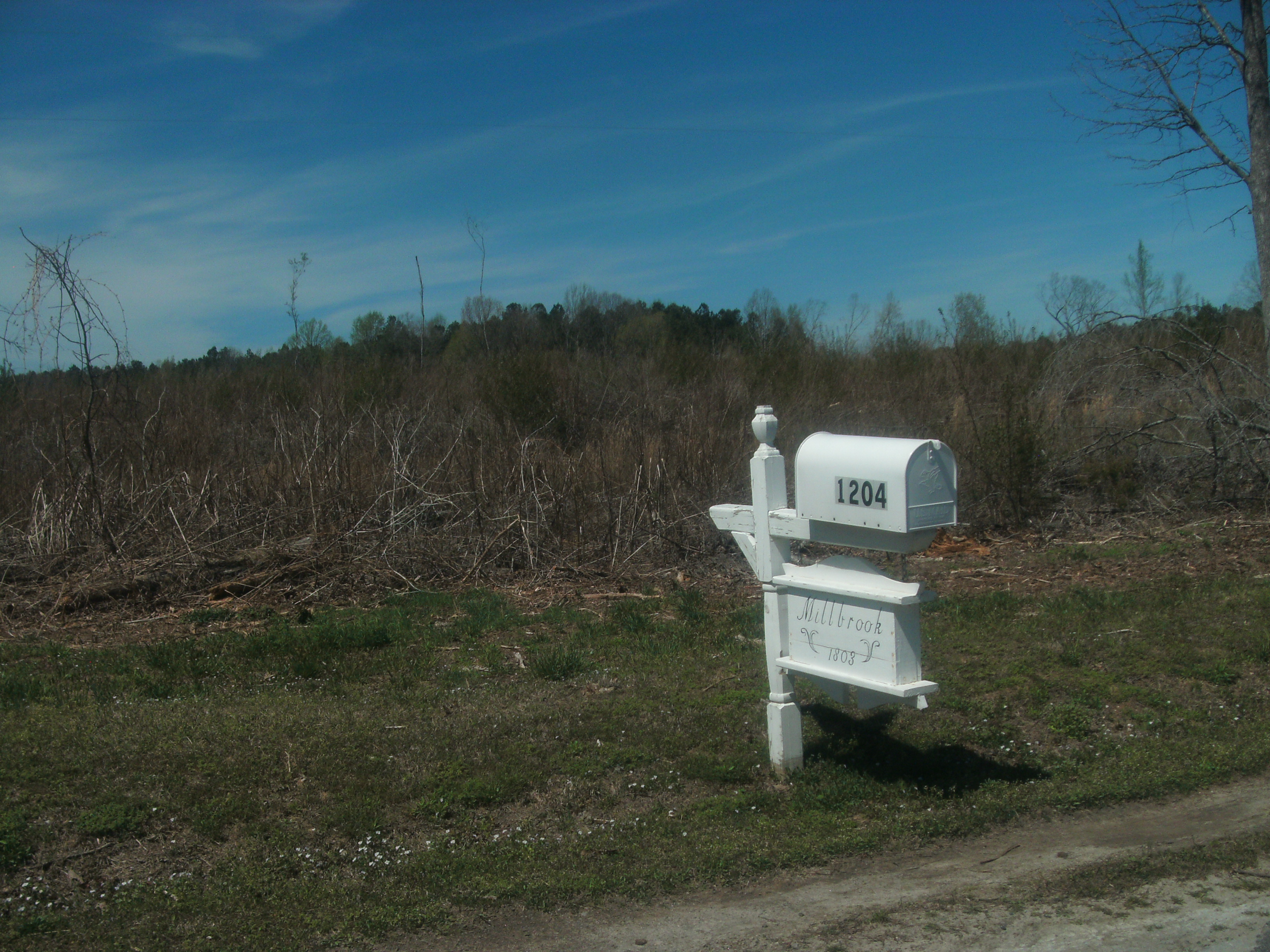
- Mailbox and sign for Millbrook, April 2017

- Location within Virginia Location within the United States
- Location: 1204 Snead Spring Rd., near Crewe, Virginia
- Coordinates: 37°6′30″N 78°6′34″W
- Area: 110 acres (45 ha)
- Built: c. 1840, c. 1855
- Architectural style: Early Republic, Federal, Greek Revival
- NRHP reference No.: 10000094
- VLR No.: 067-0012

Significant dates
- Added to NRHP: March 23, 2010
- Designated VLR: December 17, 2009

Millbrook is a historic home and farm complex located near Crewe, Nottoway County, Virginia. The original section of the Federal-style main house was built about 1840, and expanded to its present size about 1855. It is a balanced two-story, five-bay, center-hall plan I-house with a Greek Revival-style centered front porch and English basement with three finished floors above. Also on the property are a contributing tobacco barn ruin, and four restored contributing buildings: kitchen, smokehouse, hay barn, and dairy.

It was listed on the National Register of Historic Places in 2010.
