= Hyde Park (Burkeville, Virginia) =

- U.S. National Register of Historic Places
- Virginia Landmarks Register
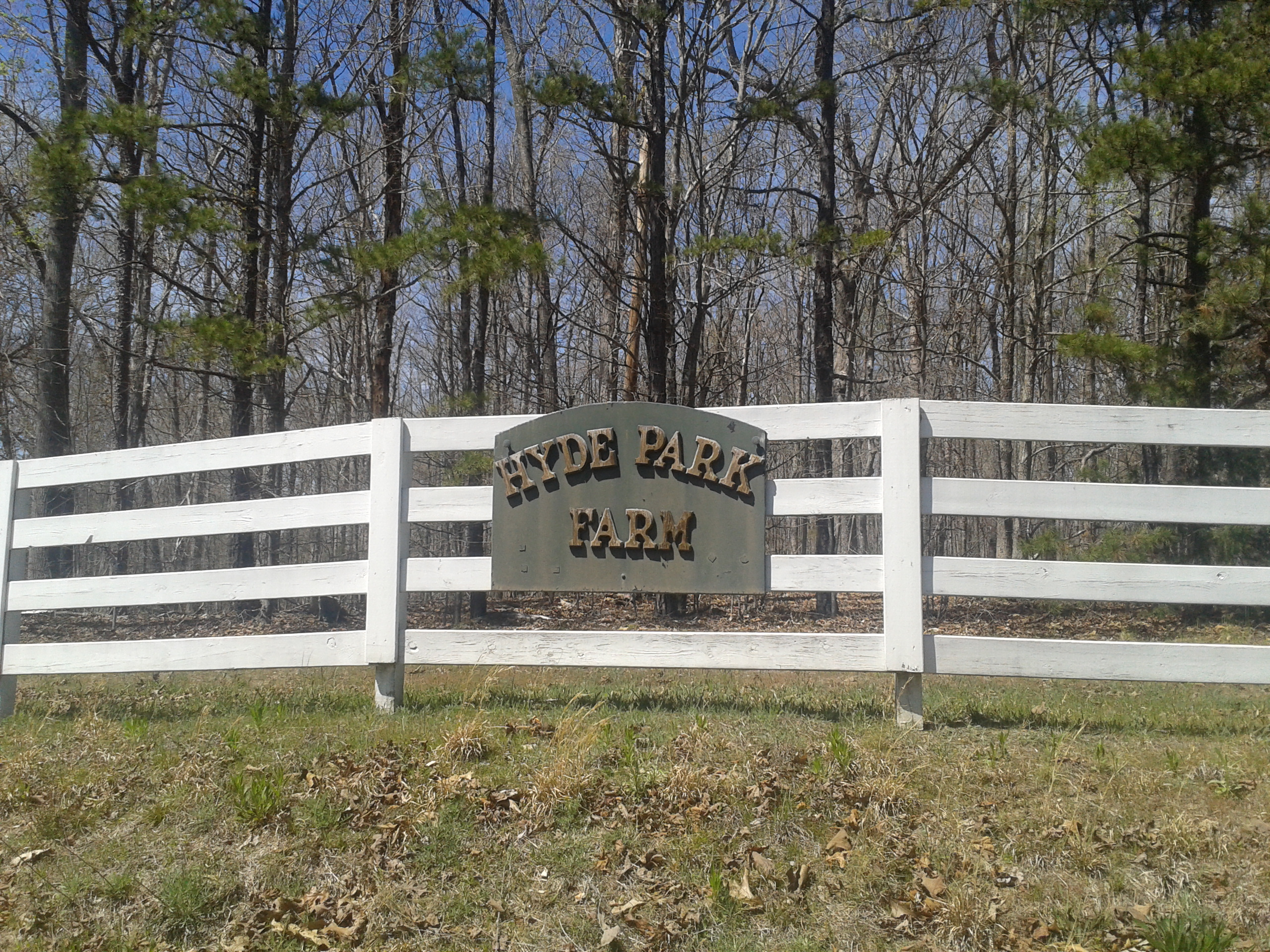
- Sign at the entrance to the property, April 2017

- Location within Virginia Location within the United States
- Location: 6808 W. Courthouse Rd., Burkeville, Virginia
- Coordinates: 37°07′17″N 78°10′17″W
- Area: 863.19 acres (349.32 ha)
- Built: 1762–1782; 244 years ago Enlarged: 1840–1860; 166 years ago Addition: 1906–1911; 115 years ago
- Built by: Fowlkes, John; Fowlkes, Paschal J.
- Architectural style: Federal; Greek Revival; Colonial Revival
- NRHP reference No.: 13000341
- VLR No.: 067-0040

Significant dates
- Added to NRHP: May 28, 2013
- Designated VLR: March 21, 2013

Hyde Park, also known as Old Field, Hyde Farmlands, Hyde Farmlands Academy, Hyde Farms, and Hyde Park Farm, is a historic home and farm complex located at Burkeville, Nottoway County, Virginia. The original section was built between 1762 and 1782, and is a three-story, three-bay, brick vernacular Federal style central passage dwelling. It was enlarged between 1840 and 1860. Between 1906 and 1911, a two-story Greek Revival-inspired brick addition was added to the east gable and a three-story Colonial Revival brick addition to the northwest corner. The farm complex also includes the tenant house, kitchen/wash house, ten log chicken houses (four in ruins), dairy barn, six small outbuildings, and the Fowlkes family cemetery. Also on the property is a large, multi-component archaeological site as well as the ruins of brooder houses, additional farm outbuildings, the tenant farmer house site, the cattle barn ruin, the old mill complex site, and the new mill complex site. During the 1930s and early 1940s, the property provided the opportunity for agriculturally skilled Jewish refugees from Nazi Germany to immigrate to America and expand the farm's productivity.

It was listed on the National Register of Historic Places in 2013.
