= Blue Ridge Sanatorium =

Charlottesville-area sanatorium

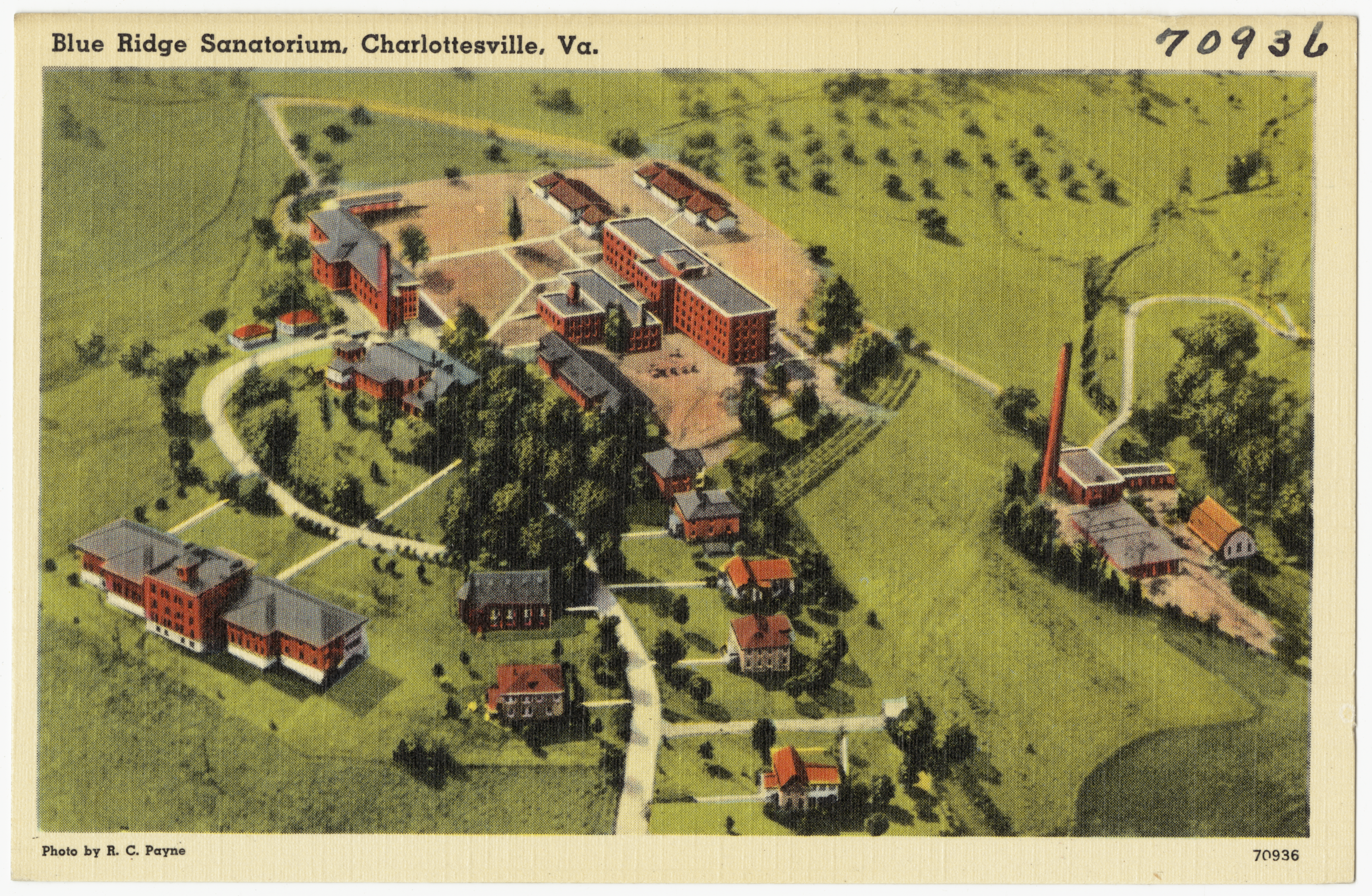
- Interactive map of the Blue Ridge Sanatorium area
- Alternative names: Blue Ridge Hospital

General information
- Coordinates: 38°00′32″N 78°28′21″W
- Opened: 1920
- Closed: 1996

Blue Ridge Sanatorium was a sanatorium for the treatment of tuberculosis located outside of Charlottesville, Virginia, United States.

The site was originally known as Moore's Brook and was operated as a private mental institution. One of its central buildings, Lyman Mansion, dates to 1875. Dr. D. M. Trice served as the director of Moore's Brook and used the grounds as a farm to breed prizewinning Berkshire pigs. As of 1908, August Mencken, younger brother of H. L. Mencken, was doing civil engineering work at the institution.

== Background ==
The government of Virginia acquired the 142 acres (57 ha) site in 1914. When it officially opened in 1920, Blue Ridge Sanatorium had room for 382 patients. Construction continued at the site for some years; in 1927, the George W. Wright Pavilion was completed, a collaborative effort between architects Charles M. Robinson and Marcellus E. Wright Sr. The Wright Pavilion was sponsored by the Grand Lodge of Virginia, on the condition that members of the Lodge were to receive preferential admission to the facility. Virginian philanthropist Paul Goodloe McIntire contributed to the building of the sanatorium's chapel.

Blue Ridge Sanatorium, along with other state-run medical institutions, was subject to racial segregation. Catawba Sanatorium (1908) and Piedmont Sanatorium (1918) had previously been established in Virginia for the treatment of tuberculosis. Black tuberculosis patients in the Charlottesville area were required to travel to Piedmont Sanatorium, as Blue Ridge Sanatorium operated from the beginning under a whites-only admissions policy. While the 1920s saw Blue Ridge Sanatorium establish a preventorium for pretubercular white children, "there were no sanatorium beds dedicated for African American children, even those with active disease, in or around Charlottesville until 1940," when Piedmont Sanatorium began to admit children.

The development of antibiotics against tuberculosis in 1946 was the beginning of the end for many American sanatoriums, as most began to see patient numbers dwindling. No new patients were admitted to Blue Ridge Sanatorium after 1962, and in 1978 the site was turned over to the University of Virginia, which renamed the facility Blue Ridge Hospital. (Note: Blue Ridge Hospital included inpatient facilities for the University of Virginia's Departments of Psychiatry, Orthopedics, Neurology, and Internal Medicine, as well as outpatient facilities for adult, child, and family psychiatry. Other components of the hospital complex included Highlands Comprehensive Epilepsy Center; Biofeedback Center; Forensic Psychiatry Clinic; Institute of Law, Psychiatry, and Public Policy; the Sleep and Dream Laboratory; and the Center for the Study of Mind and Human Interaction.) While the Commonwealth of Virginia was expected to provide $10 million in funding, only $3 million was eventually provided, resulting in several buildings, including the Lyman Mansion, not being renovated. Vamik Volkan served as medical director of Blue Ridge Hospital from 1978 to 1996, and was responsible for founding the Center for the Study of Mind and Human Interaction there in 1988.

Blue Ridge Hospital closed its doors in 1996. In 2001, the property was transferred to the UVA Foundation. Many of the surviving buildings were reportedly deteriorating as of 2002, and a tentative proposal from Monticello to acquire the site and demolish many buildings drew strenuous protests from the university community and local historians. Eventually, the UVA Foundation acted to preserve the property using "mothballing" standards developed by the National Park Service and posted a resident overseer to deter trespassing. Eleven surviving buildings were stabilized by the Foundation, including a barn, various silos, the Wright Pavilion, the Chapel, Lyman Mansion, and the Bradbury houses.

The site of the former Blue Ridge Sanatorium is not accessible to the public. Documents from the Blue Ridge Sanatorium are preserved at the Claude Moore Library of the University of Virginia.
