= Burke's Tavern =

Historic commercial building in Virginia, United States

- U.S. National Register of Historic Places
- Virginia Landmarks Register
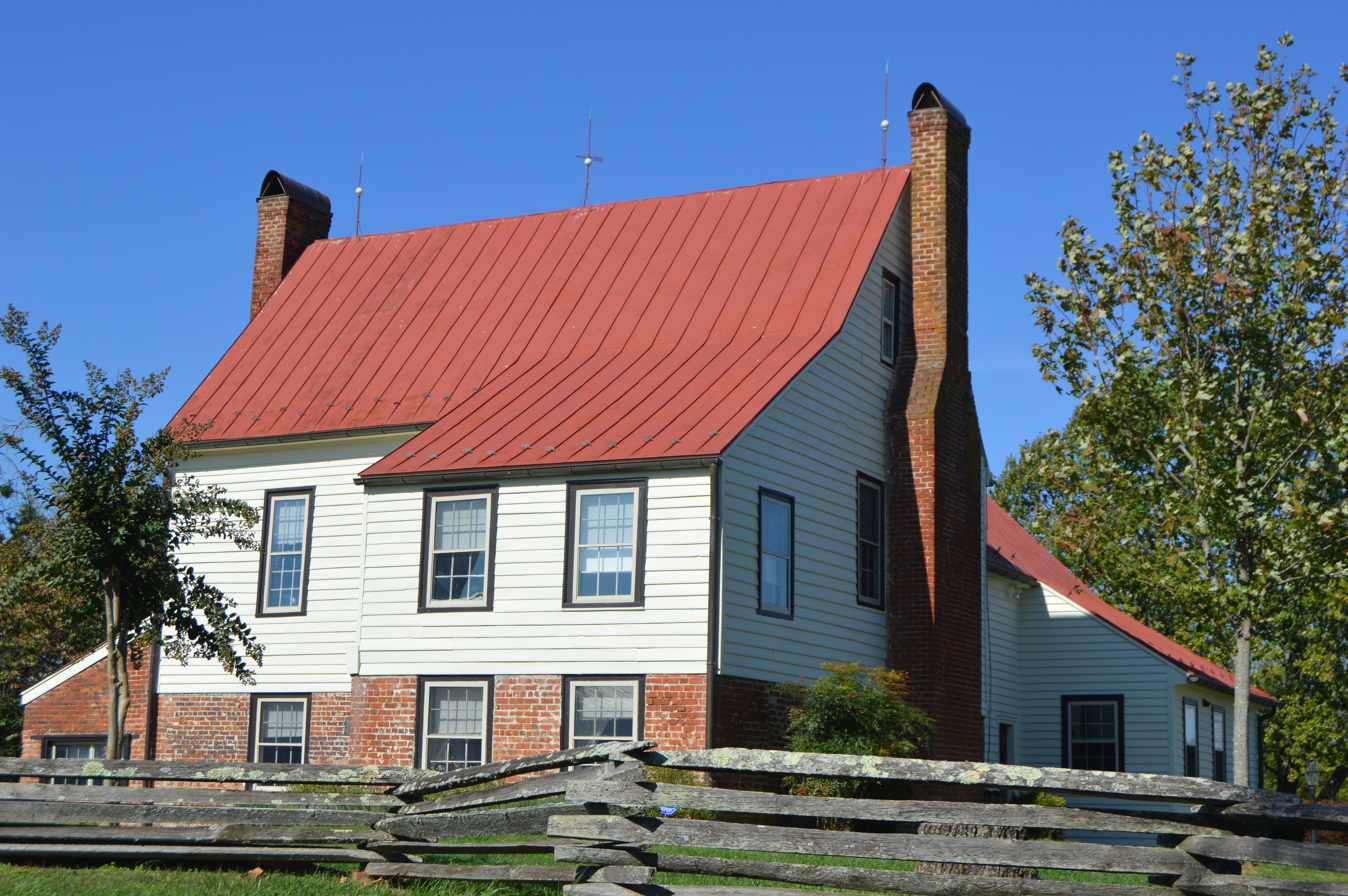
- Front and eastern side

- Location within Virginia Location within the United States
- Location: 1.5 mi. W of Burkeville at jct. of VA 621 and VA 607, near Burkeville, Virginia
- Coordinates: 37°11′43″N 78°14′17″W
- Area: 2 acres (0.81 ha)
- NRHP reference No.: 75002027
- VLR No.: 067-0047

Significant dates
- Added to NRHP: July 17, 1975
- Designated VLR: June 17, 1975

Burke's Tavern is a historic inn and tavern located near Burkeville, Nottoway County, Virginia. It was built in 1731, and is a one-story frame building set upon a ground-level brick basement. The building has a central hall, single pile plan. It features brick exterior end chimneys. Near the end of the American Civil War in 1865, the Union Brigadier General Thomas Alfred Smyth of Delaware, wounded at the Battle of High Bridge was brought to the house, where he died on April 9. Smythe was the last Union general to be killed in the war.

It was listed on the National Register of Historic Places in 1975.
