= Inverness-shire (disambiguation) =

Inverness-shire or the County of Inverness, is a historic county in Scotland. It may also refer to:

- Inverness-shire (Parliament of Scotland constituency)
- Inverness-shire (UK Parliament constituency)
- Inverness County, Nova Scotia
- Municipality of the County of Inverness, Nova Scotia
