= Inverness (Burkeville, Virginia) =

Historic house in Virginia, United States

- U.S. National Register of Historic Places
- U.S. Historic district
- Virginia Landmarks Register
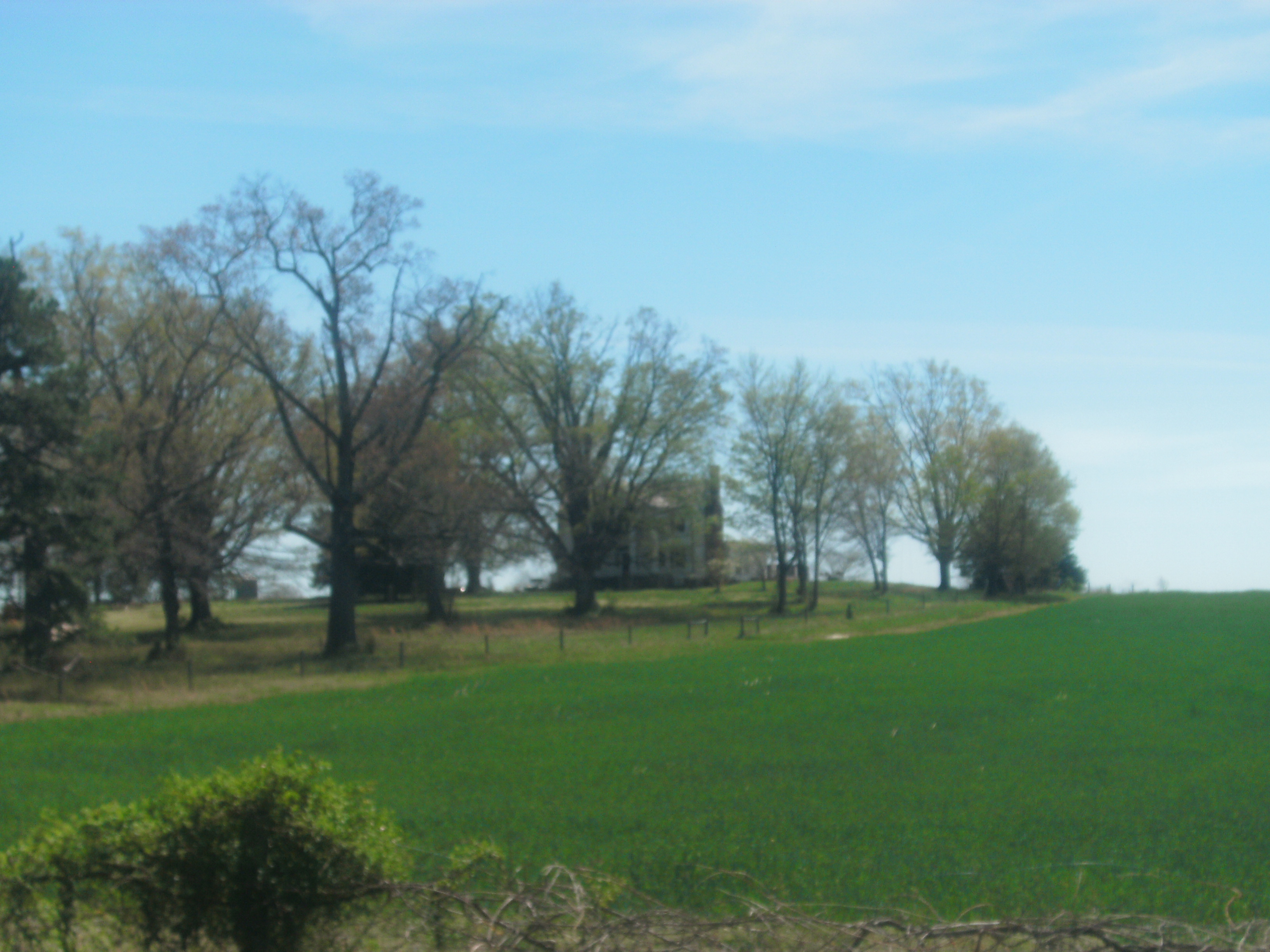
- Inverness in April 2017

- Location within Virginia Location within the United States
- Location: 884 Inverness Ave., Burkeville, Virginia
- Coordinates: 37°10′34″N 78°11′21″W
- Area: 321 acres (130 ha)
- Built: c. 1800-1820, c. 1845, c. 1895, c. 1907
- Architectural style: Classical Revival
- NRHP reference No.: 99001602
- VLR No.: 067-0003

Significant dates
- Added to NRHP: December 22, 1999
- Designated VLR: September 15, 1999

Inverness is a historic plantation house and national historic district located near Burkeville, Nottoway County, Virginia. In its present form the house is a five-bay, two-story, gable-roofed, L-shaped frame-and-weatherboard I-house set above a high basement, with exterior end chimneys. The original section of the house was built about 1800, and raised to two stories in the early-19th century. A large, two-story, two-room wing was added about 1845, forming the "L"-shape. Around 1895 a crude, two-story kitchen wing, was attached to the 1845 wing, and side porches were added. A Classical Revival monumental portico with four Doric order columns and a small second-floor balcony, was installed across the three center bays of the front facade about 1907. Also on the property are a contributing 20th century frame and cement-block dairy barn, and a 20th-century frame milk shed.

It was listed on the National Register of Historic Places in 1999.
