= List of ships named Inverness =

A number of ships have been named Inverness after the city in Scotland, including:-

- Inverness (1869 barque), a barque in service 1869–96.
- SS Inverness (1899), a steamship in service 1899–1901.
- SS Inverness (1902), a steamship in service 1902–29.
- SS Inverness (1940), a steamship in service 1940–41.
- MV Inverness (1945), a motor vessel in service 1946–53.
- HMS Inverness (M102), a Sandown-class minesweeper in service 1991–2004
