= Horsepen Creek (Potomac River tributary) =

Coordinates: 38°59′30.39″N 77°28′10.96″W

Horsepen Creek is one of the streams that flow into the Potomac River and then into the Chesapeake Bay. Horsepen Creek lies in Fairfax County, Virginia, a major county in Northern Virginia on the U.S. East Coast.

== Fecal coliforms ==
The water in Horsepen Creek is listed by the Environmental Protection Agency as containing fecal coliforms, although not in a great enough quantity to dangerously increase the likelihood of pathogens being present. According to the report, the levels of fecal coliforms must not be allowed to reach 200 colony-forming units per 100ml in the summer or 1000 colony-forming units per 100ml in the winter.

== Watershed restoration ==
Horsepen Creek and Sugarland Run are part of a Watershed Restoration Level II Area, with the condition of Horsepen Creek ranging from fair to very poor. This is because of the poor habitat provided, both for land animals and for fish.

== Variations in the name ==
While Fairfax County refers to this as "Horsepen Creek", the U.S. Geological Survey names it "Horsepen Run".

== See also ==
- List of rivers of Virginia
