= Sneads Spring, Virginia =

Unincorporated community in Virginia, United States

- Unincorporated community
- Location within Virginia Location within the United States
- Coordinates: 37°6′31″N 78°6′33″W
- Country: United States
- State: Virginia
- County: Nottoway
- Elevation: 443 ft (135 m)
- Time zone: UTC−5 (Eastern (EST))
  - Summer (DST): UTC−4 (EDT)
- GNIS feature ID: 1493620

Sneads Spring is an unincorporated community in Nottoway County, Virginia, United States.
