= Nottoway Correctional Center =

All-male state prison in Burkeville, Virginia

Coordinates: 37°10′59.3″N 78°10′30.3″W

- Interactive map of Nottoway Correctional Center
- Location: 2892 Schutt Road Burkeville, Virginia
- Status: open
- Security class: mixed (reception and classification facility)
- Capacity: 1112
- Opened: 1984
- Managed by: Virginia Department of Corrections

Nottoway Correctional Center is an all-male state prison in Burkeville, Nottoway County, Virginia, USA. A low-security work center is on the same site.

Nottoway, as a Level 3 security facility, has inmates serving long term sentences, including single, multiple, and life sentences. Inmates must exhibit no disruptive behavior for at least 24 months in order to be considered for transfer to a less-secure facility.
