= Burkeville, Virginia =

Town in Virginia, United States

- Town
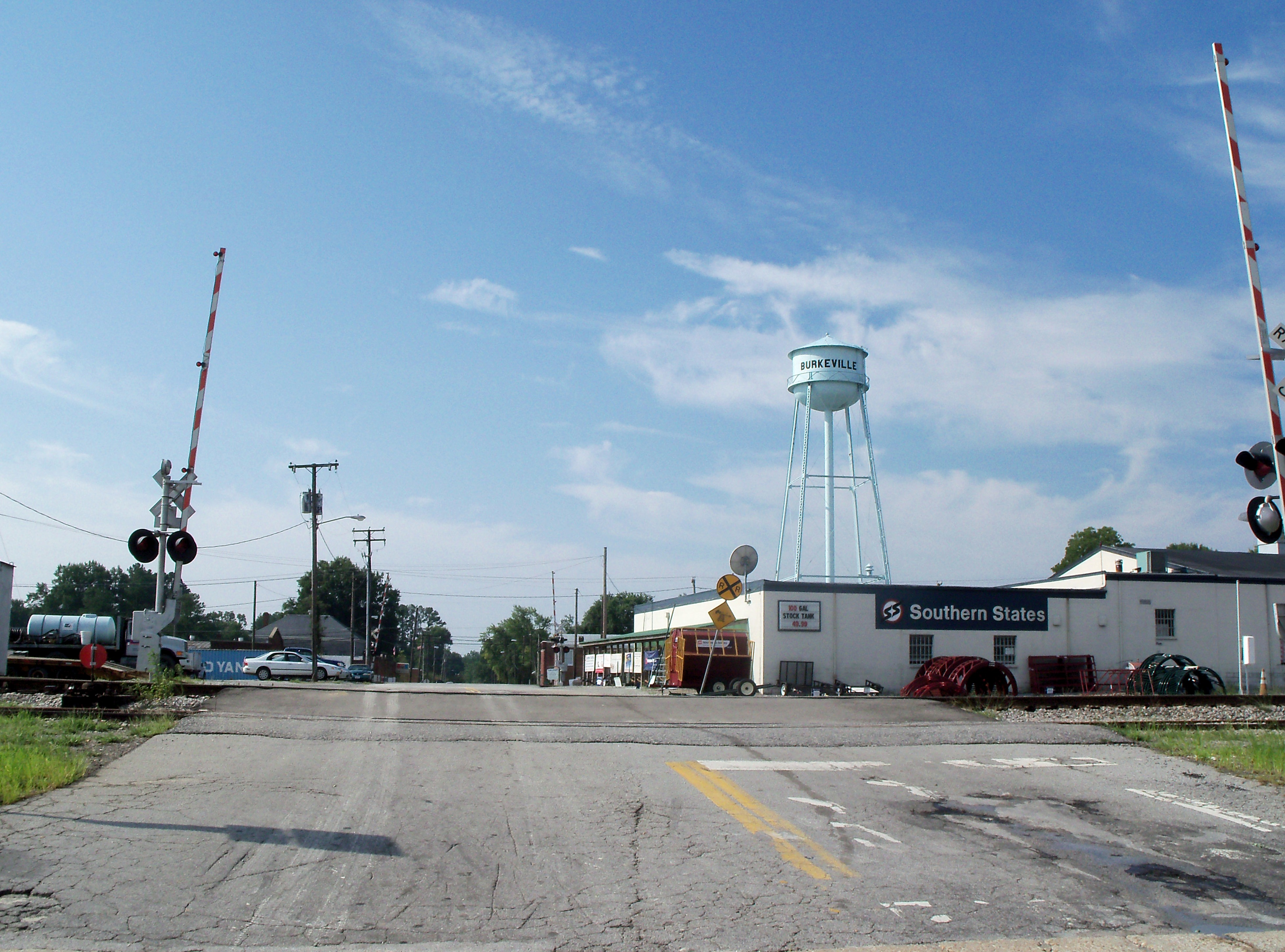
- Central Burkeville

- Flag Seal

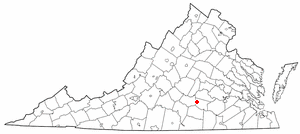
- Location of Burkeville, Virginia
- Coordinates: 37°11′14″N 78°12′6″W
- Country: United States
- State: Virginia
- County: Nottoway

Area
  - Total: 1.01 sq mi (2.61 km^{2})
  - Land: 1.00 sq mi (2.59 km^{2})
  - Water: 0.0077 sq mi (0.02 km^{2})
- Elevation: 548 ft (167 m)

Population (2020)
  - Total: 417
  - Estimate (2019): 399
  - Density: 398.7/sq mi (153.92/km^{2})
- Time zone: UTC-5 (Eastern (EST))
  - Summer (DST): UTC-4 (EDT)
- ZIP code: 23922
- Area code: 434
- FIPS code: 51-11560
- GNIS feature ID: 1464115
- Website: https://www.townofburkeville.com/

Burkeville is an incorporated town in Nottoway County, Virginia, United States. As of the 2020 census, Burkeville had a population of 417. The source of the town name is disputed. The town is located at the crossroads of U.S. routes 360 and 460.

== Major employers ==
- Luck Stone, Burkeville Plant, is the nation’s largest family-owned and -operated producer of crushed stone, sand, and gravel. In 1935 Luck Stone purchased the Burkeville Plant, located on the Route 360/460 bypass in Nottoway County, Virginia. The Burkeville plant is the recipient of the National Stone, Sand & Gravel Association’s 1997 About Face Award for Outstanding Achievement.
- A Southern States Cooperative store provides a full range of services and growing solutions for large commercial farming, tending backyard gardens, and trying to keep home yards looking green and lush.
- James River Equipment operates a John Deere dealership here.
- The Nottoway Correctional Center is an all-male state prison. As a Level 3–security facility, it has inmates serving long-term sentences, including single, multiple, and life sentences. A low-security work center is on the same site.
- The Piedmont Geriatric Hospital is Virginia's only state facility dedicated solely to the evaluation and treatment of persons over the age of 65.
- The Virginia Center for Behavioral Rehabilitation (VCBR) was opened in 2008 in Burkeville. Operated by the Department of Behavioral Health and Developmental Services (DBHDS), it provides a secure environment for the treatment of adults legally classified as sexually violent predators. In 2022 it expanded by building a second facility on site, increasing its total capacity to about 600 beds.
- The Burkeville Lodge is a vacation spot for the visually impaired to gather with family and friends. It was established in 1960 by the Virginia Association of Workers for the Blind at its current location.
- Frito-Lay operates a distribution warehouse it built in 2021 on Lewiston Plank Road.

== History ==
The Town of Burkeville, Virginia was established in 1877.

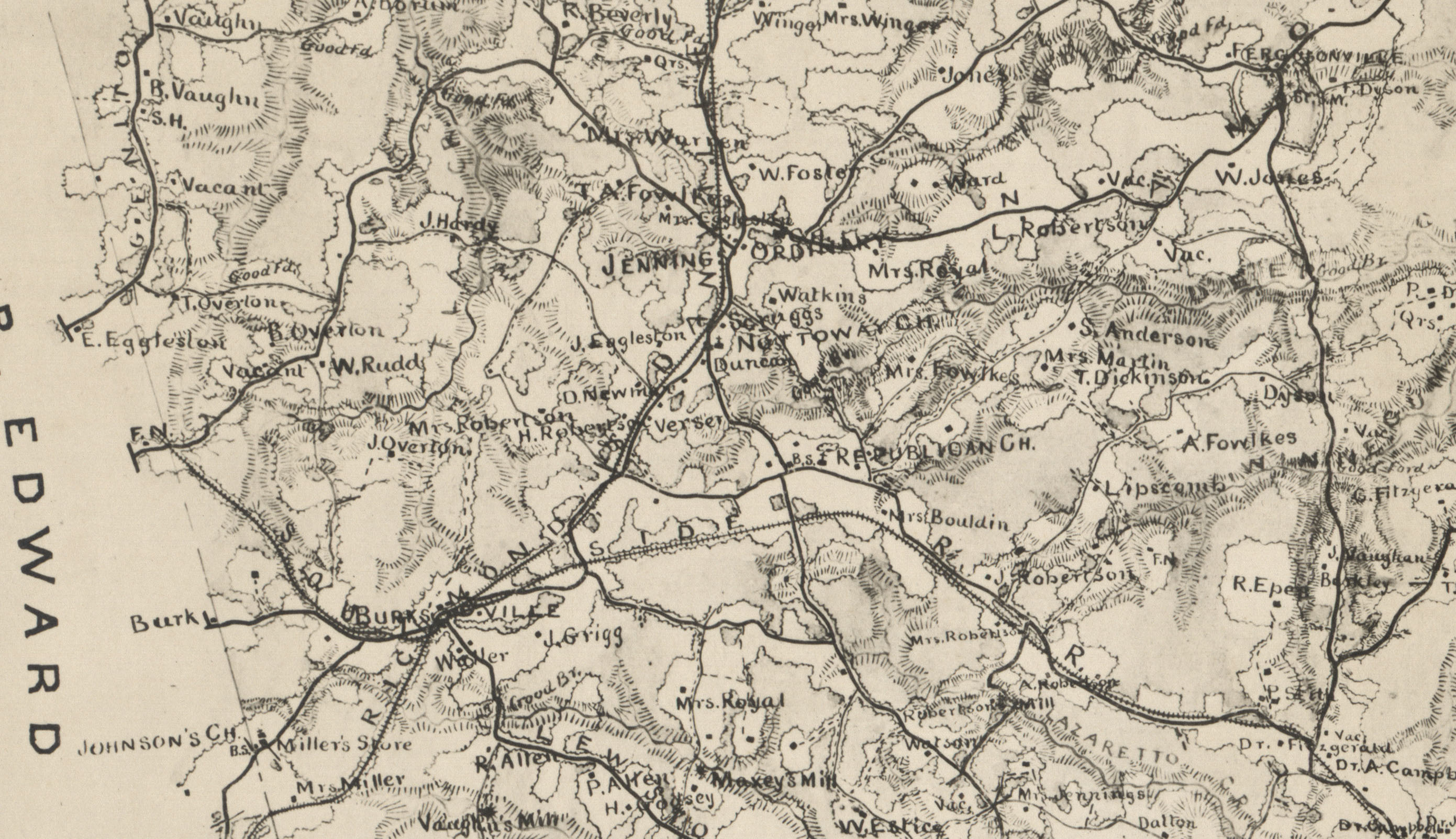
Burksville and Jennings Ordinary area of Nottoway County, Virginia, 1864

Burkeville was named either for a tavern or for a Samuel Burke, and was formerly called "Burke's Junction". It was founded at the junction of the Richmond and Danville Railroad and the Southside Railroad in the mid-nineteenth century. The Southside became the Atlantic, Mississippi and Ohio Railroad in 1870, then a line in the Norfolk and Western Railway, and finally a line in the Norfolk Southern Railway.

The rail line from Burkeville to Pamplin City, after being abandoned, was converted by the Virginia Department of Parks and Recreation into High Bridge Trail State Park. The state of Virginia has still yet to complete the portion from approximately 1 mile out into the town of Burkeville as of July 1, 2023.

The last major Civil War battle in the Appomattox campaign was fought nearby at Sayler's Creek on April 6, 1865. Here were unconditionally surrendered more men than in any other battle on American soil. General Robert E. Lee's depleted forces lost over 7,000 men killed, wounded, or taken prisoner either at Sayler's Creek or at General John B. Gordon's engagement the same day, a few miles west. Lee surrendered at Appomattox three days later.

Ella Graham Agnew was appointed in 1910 by the United States Department of Agriculture to be the first State Agent for women, and was the first woman to be appointed by the Department to represent it in the field. She had moved to the town as a baby and was later buried in the community's Sunset Cemetery.

Burke's Tavern, Hyde Park, and Inverness are listed on the National Register of Historic Places.

== Geography ==
Burkeville is located at 37°11′14″N 78°12′6″W (37.187, -78.202). According to the United States Census Bureau, the town has a total area of 1.0 square miles (2.6 km^{2}), of which 1.0 square miles (2.6 km^{2}) is land and 0.99% is water.

Twin Lakes State Park (formerly Prince Edward–Goodwin Lake State Park) is to the west of town.

== Demographics ==
Historical population
Census	Pop.	Note	%±
1880	237		—
1890	404		70.5%
1900	510		26.2%
1910	653		28.0%
1920	514		−21.3%
1930	755		46.9%
1940	658		−12.8%
1950	695		5.6%
1960	705		1.4%
1970	703		−0.3%
1980	606		−13.8%
1990	535		−11.7%
2000	489		−8.6%
2010	432		−11.7%
2020	417		−3.5%
U.S. Decennial Census

As of the census of 2000, there were 489 people, 206 households, and 134 families residing in the town. The population density was 486.3 people per square mile (186.9/km^{2}). There were 248 housing units, at an average density of 246.6 per square mile (94.8/km^{2}). The racial makeup of the town was 62.78% White, 34.76% African American, 1.02% from other races, 1.43% from two or more races, and 1.43% Hispanic or Latino of any race.

There were 206 households, out of which 27.7% had children under the age of 18 living with them, 43.7% were married couples living together, 18.4% had a female householder with no husband present, and 34.5% were non-families. 30.6% of all households were made up of individuals, and 16.0% had someone living alone who was 65 or older. The average household size was 2.37, and the average family size was 2.95.

23.3% of the population was under the age of 18, 8.8% from 18 to 24, 25.2% from 25 to 44, 24.1% from 45 to 64, and 18.6% aged 65 or older. The median age was 40 years. For every 100 females there were 91.8 males. For every 100 females age 18 and over, there were 90.4 males.

The median household income was $29,821, and the median family income was $39,688. Males had a median income of $23,542, versus $21,442 for females. The per capita income for the town was $15,947. About 7.8% of families and 12.3% of the population were below the poverty line, including 16.1% of those under age 18 and 8.7% of those age 65 or over.
