= Nottoway River =

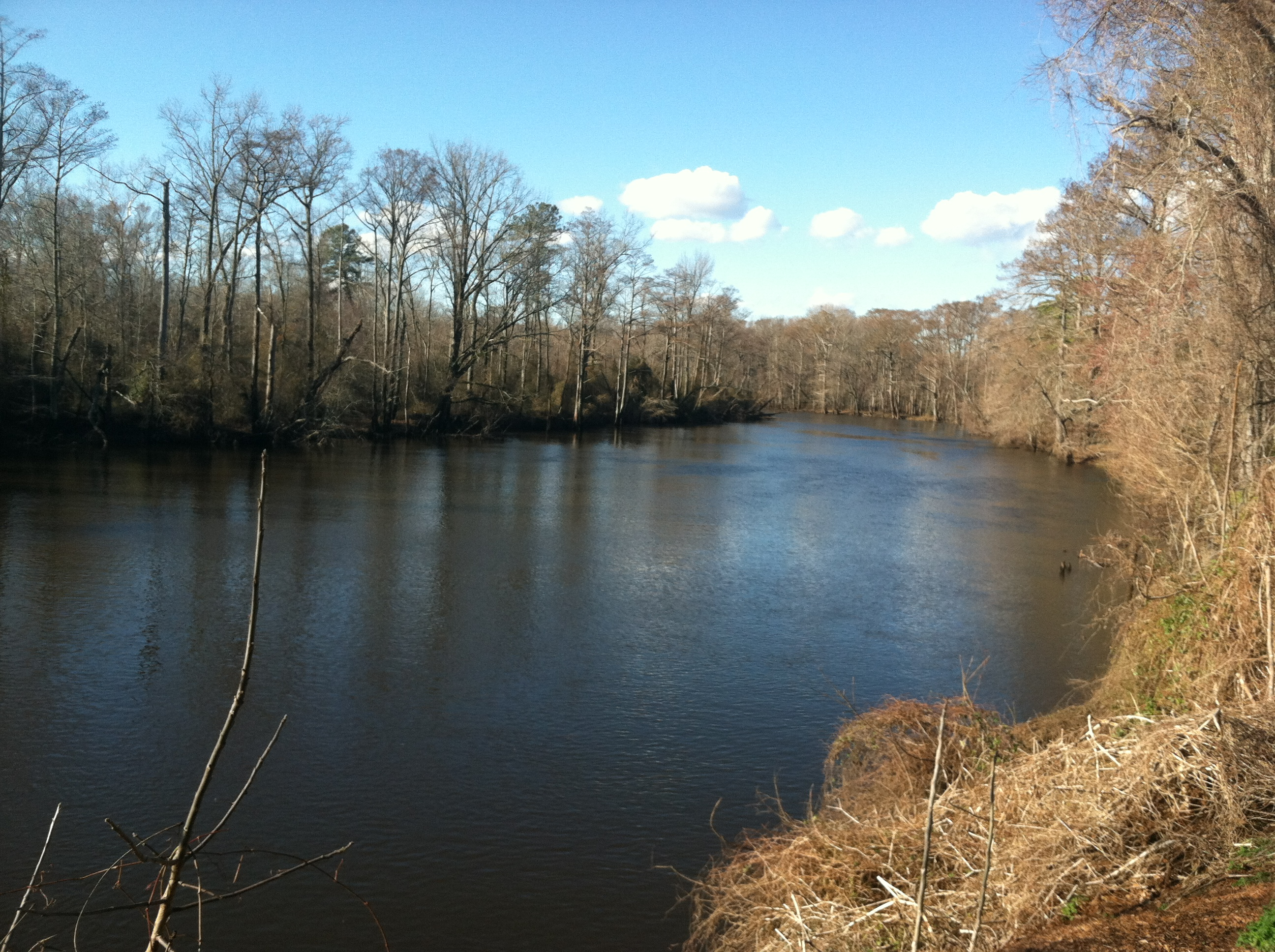
- Nottoway River in Courtland, Virginia

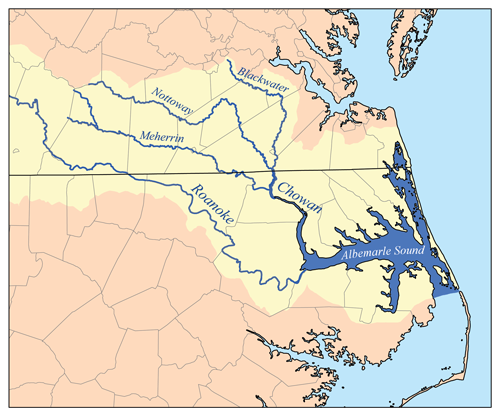

Location
- Country: United States
- State: Virginia, North Carolina

Physical characteristics
- Source
  - location: Boundary between Prince Edward and Lunenberg Counties
  - coordinates: 37°06′22″N 078°19′18″W
- Mouth: Chowan River
  - location: Confluence with the Blackwater River to form the Chowan River
  - coordinates: 36°32′38″N 076°54′58″W
- Length: 155 miles
- Basin size: 1.1 million acres

Basin features
- Progression: southeast
- River system: Chowan River

The Nottoway River is a river in the U.S. State of Virginia and northeastern North Carolina that is 155 miles (249 kilometers) in length. The river begins in Prince Edward County and merges with the Blackwater River to form the Chowan River in North Carolina. The river is part of the Chowan River system, which empties into the Albemarle Sound in North Carolina.

== Course ==
The Nottoway River rises in a dense forest outside of Scholfield, an unincorporated community in Prince Edward County. The Nottoway serves as the boundary of Prince Edward and Lunenburg counties, then Nottoway and Lunenburg counties. The river serves as the boundaries for other counties such as Brunswick, Dinwiddie, Sussex, where it makes a northeastern jump, and Greensville County. The river courses southeast into Southampton County.

The Nottoway River reaches North Carolina 9.53 miles (15.34 km) south of Franklin, Virginia. The river briefly enters North Carolina for 1,455 feet (443 meters) ending at the confluence of the Blackwater & Nottoway rivers, creating the Chowan River in Hertford County, North Carolina. The Chowan empties into Albemarle Sound.

== Fishing ==
The Nottoway River is known for its abundance of bass, catfish, and bluegill. Multiple counties have provided sports and recreational access through numerous boat ramps along the river.

== Cities and towns ==
Cities and towns along the river include:

- Courtland, Virginia
- Stony Creek, Virginia

== See also ==
- List of rivers of the Americas
- List of Virginia rivers
- Cactus Hill
