= Chowan River =

River in North Carolina and Virginia, United States

Coordinates: 36°1′0″N 76°39′43″W

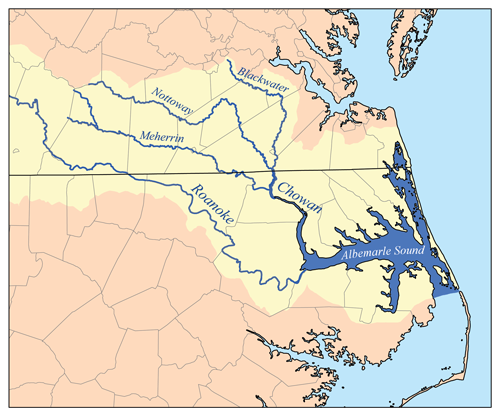

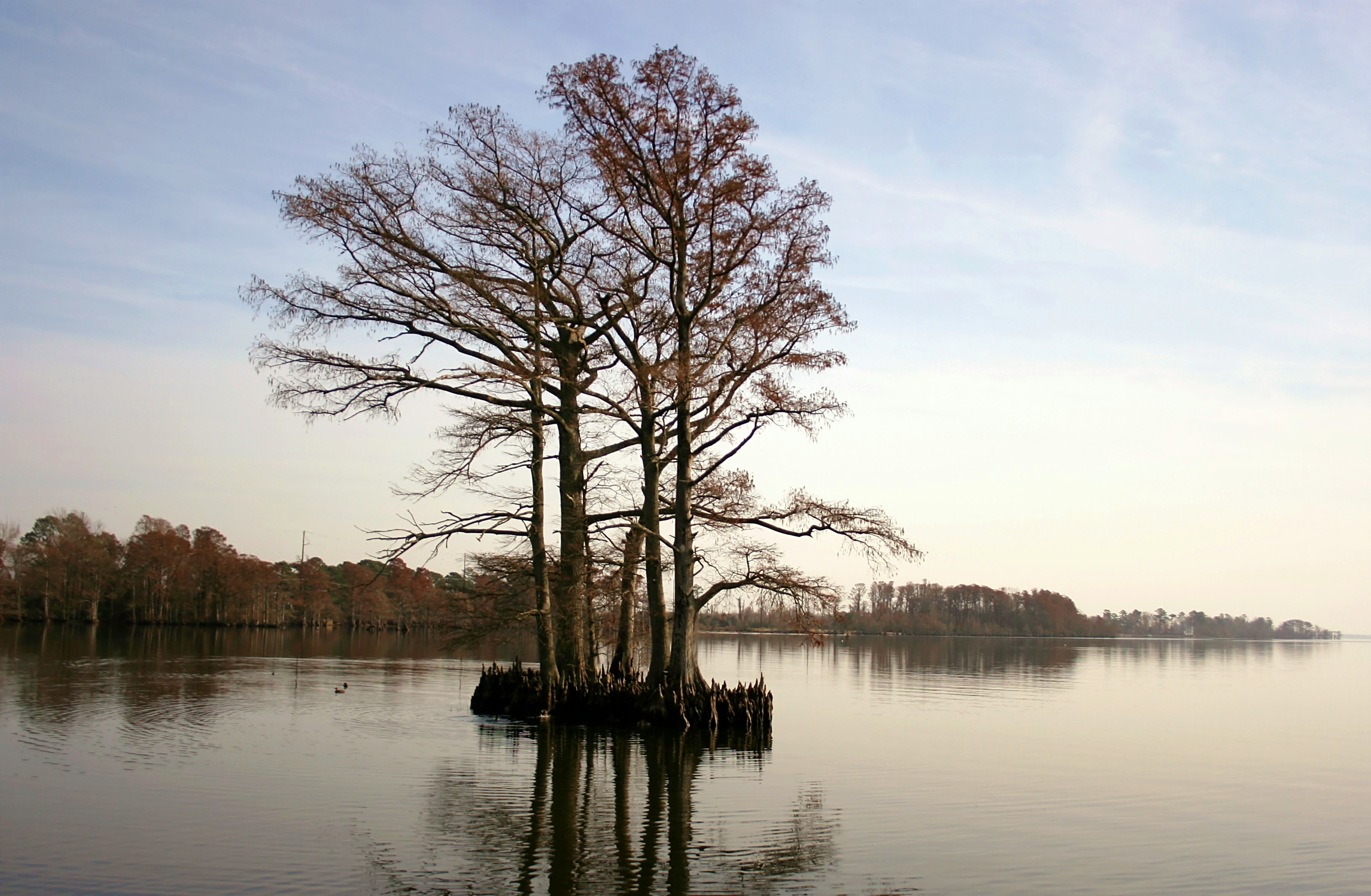
A scene along the Chowan River

The Chowan River (cho-WAHHN) is a blackwater river formed with the merging of Virginia's Blackwater and Nottoway rivers near the state line between Virginia and North Carolina. According to the USGS a variant name is Choan River.

Flowing for approximately 50 miles (80 km) before ending in the Albemarle Sound on North Carolina's coast, the river drains about 4,800 square miles (12,000 km^{2}) of land in North Carolina and Virginia. Flowing through mostly swamp land with occasional high ground, the Chowan River grows to nearly two miles wide (3 km) at its opening to the Albemarle Sound. The river offers excellent fishing for catfish and largemouth bass. While tidal, the variation in tide heights in the Chowan River are normally less than one foot (30 cm) between high and low tide. The average depth is 16 feet and the maximum depth is 40 feet around Holiday Island.

The Chowan River Bridge, also known as the Eden House bridge, on US Route 17 marks the border between the Chowan River and Albemarle Sound. Edenhouse Point, a cape named after former North Carolina governor Charles Eden, is located at the southern end of the bridge.

Significant tributaries include Bonds Creek, the Meherrin River, Bennett's Creek (which connects the Chowan River with Merchant's Millpond State Park), and the Wiccacon River.

== History ==
The river featured prominently in the Civil War in the region. As part of the Union plan to destroy the Wilmington and Weldon Railroad, Union ships sailed up the Chowan river, bombarding small Confederate posts outside of Harrellsville, North Carolina (at Deep Creek, also known as Swain's Mill Creek) and outside of Cofield, North Carolina (at Petty's Shore, where an old bunker is still visible in the landscape). By the time the ships reached Winton, North Carolina, the local troops had been alerted to the oncoming ships. Hiding in the woods near the dock for an ambush, the Confederate battalion at Winton sent a slave girl down to the Union boats to tell them that the locals had fled in fear of a Union attack. The ambush was foiled, however, when a Union soldier saw the gleam of the sun on a musket barrel in the woods. The Union ships quickly pulled anchor, regrouped, and returned minutes later to burn Winton to the ground. That same Union fleet would go on to land at Murfreesboro, North Carolina (via the Meherrin River) and march west to the railroad at Weldon.

The Chowan River is one of the three oldest surviving English place names in the United States. Along with Roanoke Island and the Neuse River, it was named in 1584 by Captains Philip Amadas and Arthur Barlowe, sent to explore the region by Sir Walter Raleigh. Their "Chowanook", or Chowanoc, name was shortened to Chowan.

== See also ==
- South Atlantic-Gulf Water Resource Region
