= Hotel Richmond =

- Ninth Street Office Building
- U.S. National Register of Historic Places
- Virginia Landmarks Register
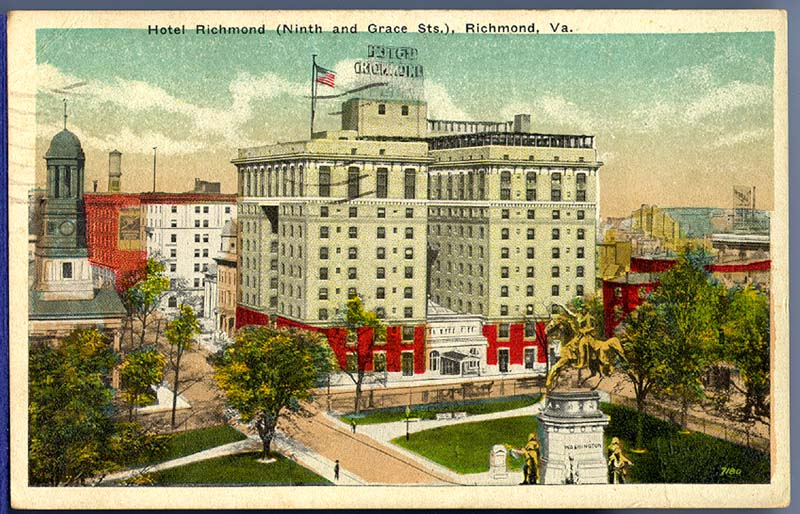
- Early postcard view of the Hotel
- Location: Richmond, Virginia
- Coordinates: 37°32′25.4″N 77°26′4.3″W
- Built: 1904
- Architect: Harrison Albright
- NRHP reference No.: 09000730
- VLR No.: 127-0180

Significant dates
- Added to NRHP: September 16, 2009
- Designated VLR: June 18, 2009

The Hotel Richmond was a historic hotel located in Richmond, Virginia. Constructed in phases between 1904 and 1911, it was a rare example of a Gilded Age hotel built by a woman, Adeline Detroit Wood Atkinson. Atkinson turned the facility into a popular meeting spot for Richmond-area politicians, and the hotel acted as the headquarters for numerous political campaigns in the early 20th century. It was also the home of WRVA, the city's first radio station, from 1933 until 1968. After operating as a hotel under various names until 1966, the building was then purchased by the Commonwealth of Virginia. It was listed to the National Register of Historic Places in 2009 as the Ninth Street Office Building, and was dedicated as the Barbara Johns Building in 2017. As of 2016 it housed the Office of the Attorney General.

== History ==
Atkinson, a Bedford County native, had come to Richmond in the early 1880s from Lynchburg, Virginia with her husband. She ran boarding houses to supplement the couple's income, eventually running hotels in Richmond as their sole income. By 1904, Atkinson had enough money to purchase the Saint Claire Hotel, which she demolished to make room for her own establishment.

The first phase of the Hotel Richmond was built in 1904 and designed by Harrison Albright. The second phase followed in 1911, this one designed by John Kevan Peebles. The building sits across Grace Street from St. Paul's Church, and next to St. Peter's Church.

Her energy got her into trouble as she bucked the city establishment. The Times-Dispatch on April 26, 1903, said that during her attempt to build the Hotel Richmond, she threatened to leave the city if she was not taxed at a more equitable rate for her Lexington as compared to the Murphy Hotel and the Jefferson Hotel. Indeed, she would not build the Hotel Richmond until she felt she was taxed at a more fair rate. She told the papers that: "I feel that I am being discriminated against because I am a woman, but if I am not wanted here, I can easily go somewhere else." The Richmond News Leader reported April 29, 1903 that she was "fuming and fretting" because of a high license fee that was to be placed on the hotel. Her issues with the city were not all about being a woman: she also stridently defended her use of "colored" men to do some of the excavation work.

The May 9, 1903 demolition that preceded the building of the Hotel Richmond was newsworthy. A neighboring house, home of the Catholic bishop, was damaged just as the demolition of the old hotel began. Miraculously, A picture of the Christ child survived "alone and uninjured" when the demolition of the St. Clare accidentally went awry.

Further additions were made by John Kevan Peebles, architect of the wings of the State Capitol, and were done in preparation for the 1907 300th anniversary of the founding of Virginia; obviously, the two were meant to be part of a whole look for Capitol Square.

On its construction it became one of many distinguished hotels in downtown Richmond that operated in the early part of the 20th century, including the Jefferson Hotel, Hotel Rueger, Murphy's Hotel, Hotel John Marshall and William Byrd Hotel. During the 1940s and 50s, it housed the studios of Richmond's top AM radio station, 1140 WRVA, and in 1948, it was joined by co-owned FM 94.5 WRVB (now WRVQ).

== Social History ==
The hotel's mezzanine housed WRVA, Richmond's pioneering AM 50,000 watt radio station. From 1939 until its relocation, WRVA had the strongest broadcasting power of any station from Washington, D.C. to Atlanta. The station aired the popular variety show Sunshine Sue and Her Rangers as well as Capitol Squirrel.

As the largest hotel immediately adjacent to Richmond's Capitol Square, the hotel had a central place in the political history of the city. Early in its life it was festooned with a Westmoreland Davis for Governor banner, and sometime in the early 19th century, it became headquarters for the state's Democratic party, with offices in the hotel's historic Parlor A. From the ballroom in 1926, the first Harry Byrd took control of the state with his Byrd Machine. At his inauguration party on the hotel's roof garden, he addressed the state on WRVA. In 1933, Gov. William M. Tuck set up an office in the building, and it was there Harry Byrd took over the seat of his father. It was, according to historian Jim Latimer, the room with the best view of the State Capitol and Executive Mansion. From the room, the final five Byrd governors (Battle, Stanley, J. Lindsay Almond, Albertis Harrison and Mills Godwin) ran their successful campaigns. In the 1970s, the building was the site of the state's tourism marketing efforts including the historic "Virginia Is For Lovers" campaign.

== Renovation ==
The hotel was renovated in 2016 by the Commonwealth of Virginia, which relocated the Attorney General's office into the refurbished hotel from the nearby Pocohantas Building. It had previously been under threat of demolition. In the current plan, the old Murphy Hotel will be razed for parking and office space. Some scenes for Steven Spielberg's movie Lincoln were filmed in the building.
