= Crozet House =

Historic house in Virginia, United States

- U.S. National Register of Historic Places
- Virginia Landmarks Register
- Richmond City Historic District
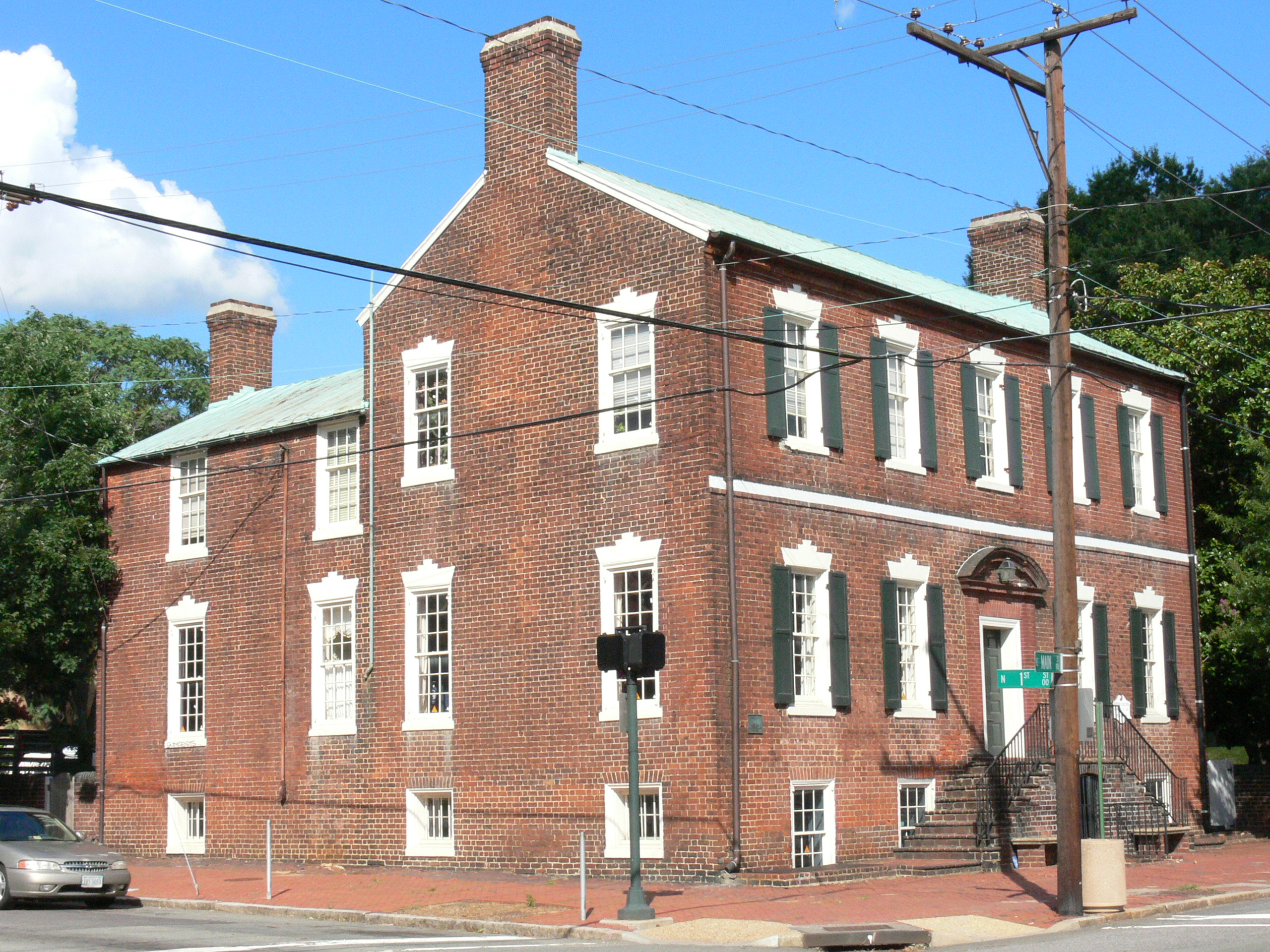
- Crozet House, July 2011

- Location within Virginia Location within the United States
- Location: 100 E. Main St., Richmond, Virginia
- Coordinates: 37°32′33″N 77°26′37″W
- Area: 9.9 acres (4.0 ha)
- Built: 1814
- Architectural style: Federal
- NRHP reference No.: 72001521
- VLR No.: 127-0047

Significant dates
- Added to NRHP: February 23, 1972
- Designated VLR: November 16, 1971

Crozet House, also known as the Curtis Carter House, is a historic home located in Richmond, Virginia. It was built in 1814, and was originally built as a two-story, five-bay, L-shaped brick house over a raised basement in the late-Federal style. It obtained its present U shape after the addition of an east wing to the rear of the house. It was built by Curtis Carter, a local brick mason and contractor. Claudius Crozet, a prominent engineer and educator, purchased the house in 1828 and lived there until 1832. His occupancy of the property gave the building its common name.

The architecture firm of Marcellus Wright Jr. maintained offices in Crozet House. It was listed on the National Register of Historic Places in 1972.
