= Hotel John Marshall =

- John Marshall Residences Logo

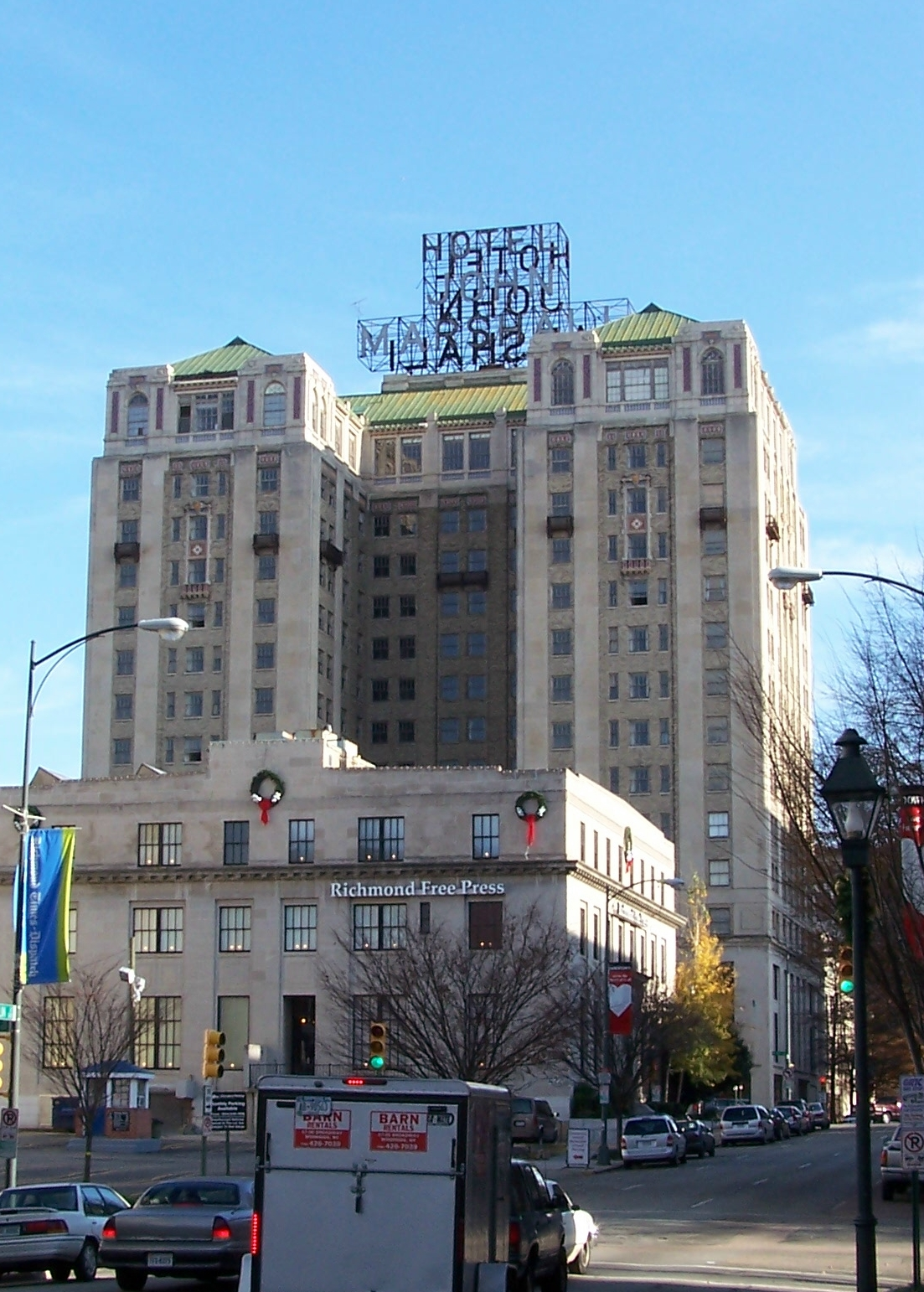
- Interactive map of the Hotel John Marshall area

General information
- Status: residential apartment building
- Location: Richmond, Virginia, 101 N. 5th Street
- Coordinates: 37°32′29″N 77°26′19″W
- Opened: October 30, 1929
- Renovated: 2011

Design and construction
- Architect: Marcellus E. Wright Sr.

Website
- johnmarshallresidences.com

The Hotel John Marshall, opened in 1929, was one of the leading hospitality establishments in downtown Richmond, Virginia. The hotel closed in 2004, and the building was renovated into apartments that opened in December 2011.

== History ==
=== Original development ===
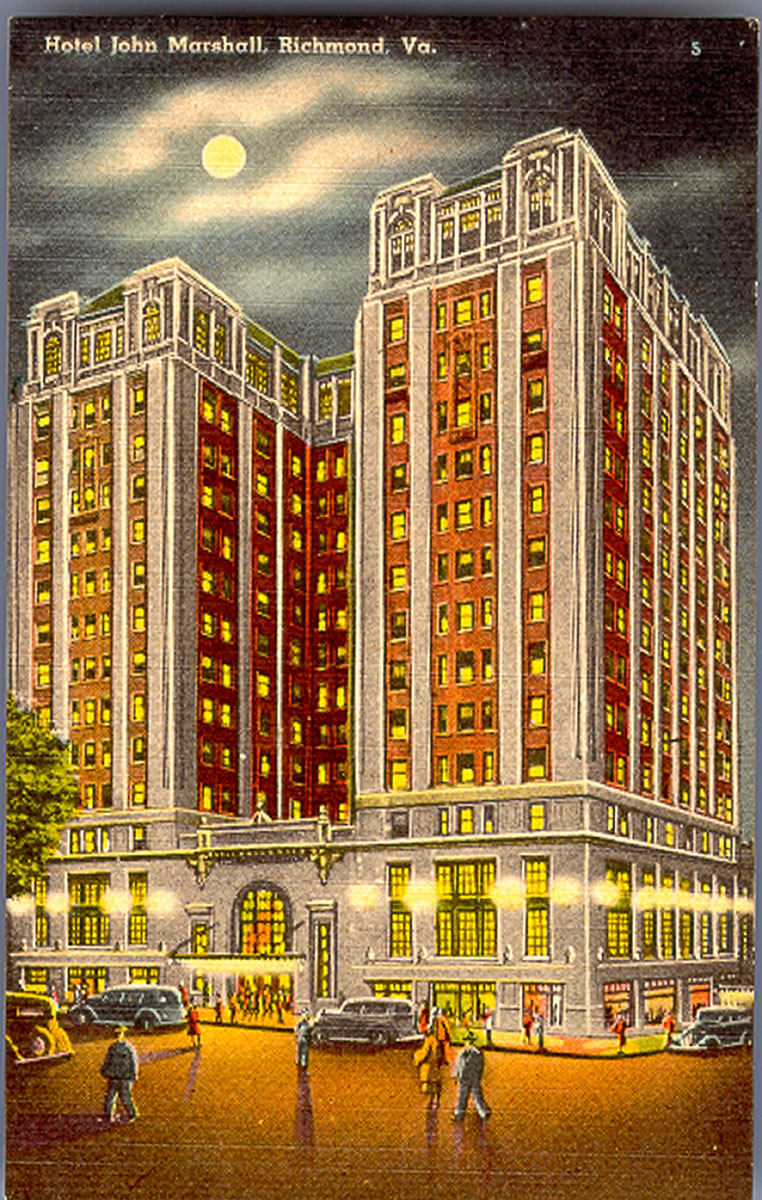
Early postcard view of the hotel

The Hotel John Marshall, located on Fifth Street between Franklin and Grace in downtown Richmond, Virginia, opened on October 30, 1929, the day after the Wall Street crash. The opening night ceremony included dinner for 600 guests, among whom were Mayor J. Fulmer Bright and Virginia Governor Harry F. Byrd.

The hotel's construction was funded by businessman Thomas Gresham of Richmond Hotels, Inc., the hotel group to which The John Marshall originally belonged. Architect Marcellus E. Wright Sr., who had studied at the Philadelphia School of Applied Art, designed the 16-story building in a neoclassical style with touches of deco and Moorish ornament. It cost $2 million to build, and the general contractor was Wise Granite and Construction Co. With 418 guest rooms, 500 bathrooms, two restaurants, ballrooms in the lobby, and a roof garden ballroom on the 16th floor, it was the largest hotel in the state when it opened. The name was reportedly chosen through a suggestion contest, with the winning entry paying tribute to Chief Justice John Marshall, whose house, now a museum, is located only a few blocks away.

=== Social history ===
When the hotel opened, it advertised itself as "The Finest Hotel in the South": from radio outlets in every room, a private switchboard manned by the Chesapeake & Potomac Telephone Co., to the rooftop garden ballroom, it was considered both modern and luxurious.

The height of the hotel's prestige was in the 1940s, when it had a staff of 400 (nearly one employee per guest room) and fed some 1,500 people a day in its restaurants. It had even begun attracting some permanent residents. During this time, the rooms, at $3/night, were more expensive than The John Marshall's chief competitors, The Jefferson or the Hotel Richmond, which rented for $2/night.

Due to its proximity to the State Capitol, three blocks away, the Hotel hosted many political events. Presidents Franklin D. Roosevelt, Harry S. Truman, Dwight Eisenhower, Richard Nixon, Gerald Ford, Jimmy Carter, and Ronald Reagan attended functions there, as well as Prime Minister Winston Churchill. It was a tradition for the outgoing state governor to meet governor-elect at the hotel on inauguration day, to proceed to the Capitol together. In 1985 Governor Douglas Wilder celebrated victory as first African-American to become Lieutenant Governor in the same room where he'd waited tables as a young man.

Entertainment stars also frequented the hotel, which counted amongst its guests Elvis Presley, Vincent Price, and Elizabeth Taylor. In 1954, the hotel added a wing of extra room from its north side, and in 1963 an exposition hall opened for retail and meeting use.

=== Hotel remodel and closure ===
In an effort to keep up with changing tastes, in 1978 the hotel went through a significant remodel, with tile paving, gold leaf, and 18' atrium in stainless steel. Despite this, the development of large new hotels that could host conventions, such as the Omni and Marriott, took a toll on the John Marshall's business in the 1980s.

In 1988 the remaining staff of 175 were laid off and 60,000 pieces of hotel memorabilia were auctioned off, from chandeliers to dining room demitasse spoons. The hotel closed it doors on May 31, 1988, leaving seven employees behind to keep up maintenance on the empty building.

The hotel re-opened in limited capacity in 1999, after Gilbert Granger, former mayor of Williamsburg, Virginia, had bought it for $3.16 million: 70 rooms were then in use, and the hotel hosted a Martini Kitchen & Bubble Bar. The hotel ran in this manner till it closed its doors again in 2004.

=== Residential redevelopment ===
In 2005, Virginia Atlantic Development, Inc., based out of Hampton Roads, acquired the property. Dominion Realty Partners came on board in 2007, and so began a $70 million remodel, including $40 million in financing from the Department of Housing and Urban Development, and both state and historic tax credits. The general contractor for the project was Choate Construction.

The development team restored the lobby to original 1930s appearance, as well as having the hotel's famous rooftop sign, now rusted, remade in new 9' letters to match the original. Holiday Signs, the designer, had the new letters hauled by crane to the roof on April 11, 2011. LED bulbs were used, running at only 30% of the energy consumption of the original sign, but they were made to look like light bulbs.

The building reopened as The Residences at The John Marshall, 238 downtown luxury apartments. It was observed that just as the hotel opened right after the Great Crash, so the apartments opened as the country was pulling out of Great Recession.

The Residences kept the long-running John Marshall Barber shop, which is on only its 3rd owner/manager, Hugh Campbell. The mirrors, countertops, and chairs from the original shop were kept and refinished.

Greenleaf's Pool Room, a pool hall and bar managed by Jim Gottier, a former professional pool player, opened in the southeast corner of The John Marshall in August 2014. Gottier named the establishment after pool player Ralph Greenleaf and designed it to capture the ambience of a classic 1930's pool hall. It closed in 2020, due to the COVID-19 pandemic.

While the roof garden ballroom was turned into penthouse units, the two lobby ballrooms were restored, including finding and restoring three of the original five chandeliers. Well-known Richmond caterer, Suzanne Wolstenholme, runs the ballrooms both as a luncheon venue and site for events such as small concerts and wedding receptions. As of spring 2013, the apartments were 100% leased, which has encouraged the building of other residential developments in downtown Richmond.
