= Murphy's Hotel =

Hotel in Richmond, Virginia

Coordinates: 37°32′28″N 77°26′5″W

Early Postcard of Murphy Hotel and Annex

Old Postcard With Dirigible

The Murphy Hotel (or Murphy's Hotel) was once a leading hotel in downtown Richmond, Virginia. Its location was at the corner of 8th and Broad Streets and for the last decade was known as the Commonwealth of Virginia's Eighth Street Office Building. The building shared a block with the Hotel Richmond, also known as the state's Ninth Street office building, and St. Peter's Church. It was deconstructed in late 2007 for a modern high-rise that would have housed offices for the Commonwealth of Virginia.

== History ==
The original hotel was built in 1872 by John Murphy, an Irish immigrant, and former Confederate soldier. He renovated his oyster shack by opening multiple rooms above it, giving birth to the Murphy Hotel. In 1886, all new buildings and an elevated walkway over 8th Street were completed.

An annex would eventually be built across 8th street in 1902 with another being built in 1907 between Broad and Grace Streets. Murphy would completely demolish the hotel in 1913 and would hire local architect John Kevan Peebles to replace it with a larger 11-story building, with the project being a success.

After John Murphy died in 1918, his son-in-law, James T. Disney, would run the hotel until his eventual death in 1933. The Board of Directors of The Richmond Hotels, Inc. would take hold of the Murphy Hotel in 1939, changing its name to the King Carter Hotel in 1949. The hotel was later sold to the state, and in 1969 was converted into numerous offices. By the late 1990s, the hotel and the annex were in a highly deteriorated state.

The hotel would be demolished in 2007 by the Commonwealth to make way for a parking deck.
