= Harrison Albright =

American architect

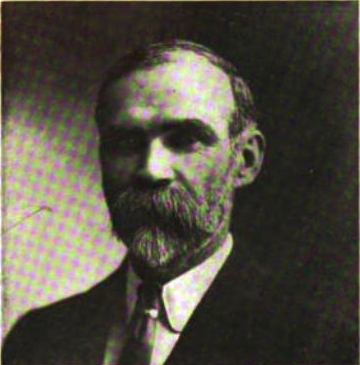
Harrison Albright (Photo by Marceau, Out West, 1909)

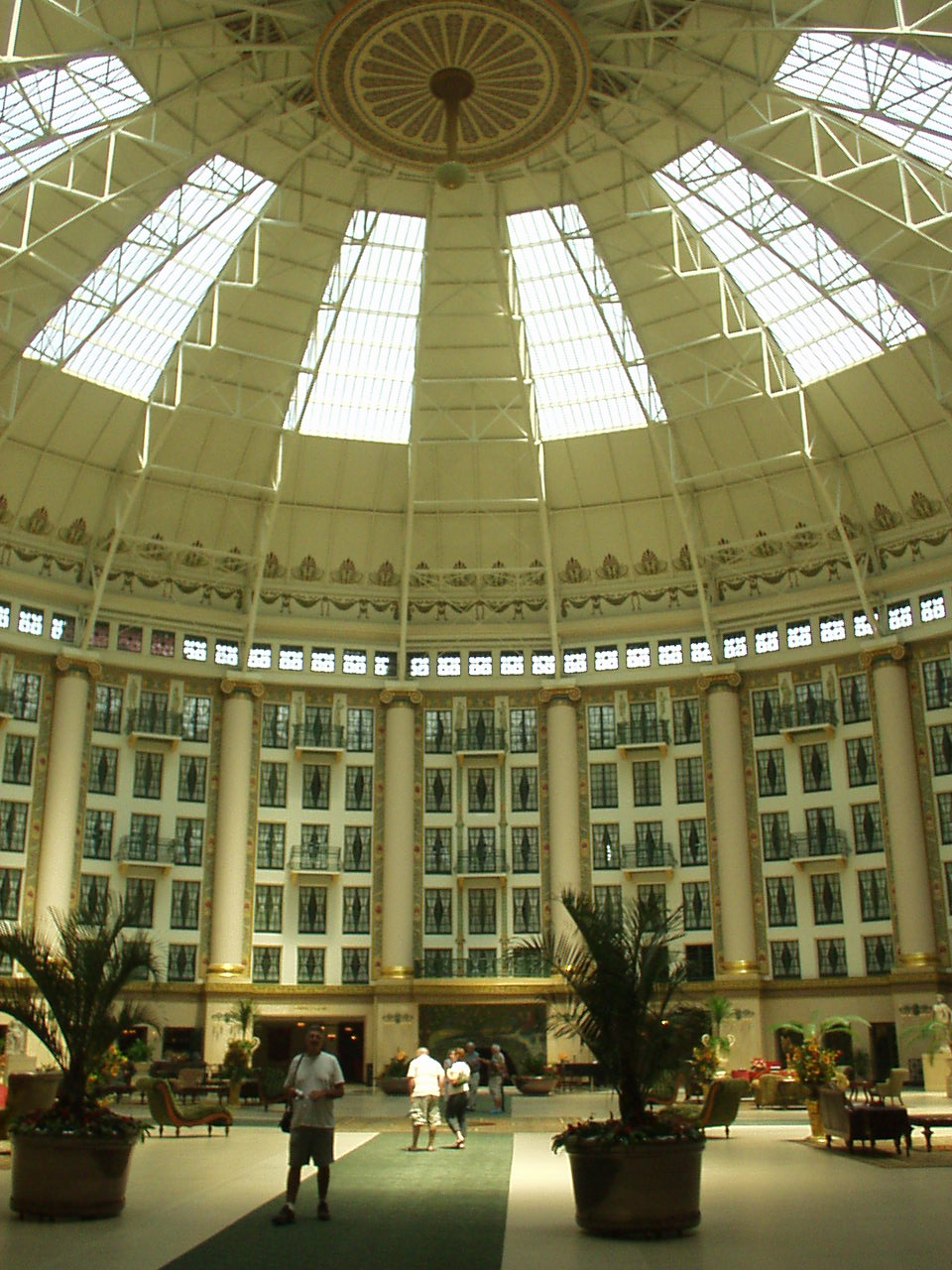
Interior of the West Baden Springs Hotel's steel and glass dome designed by Albright

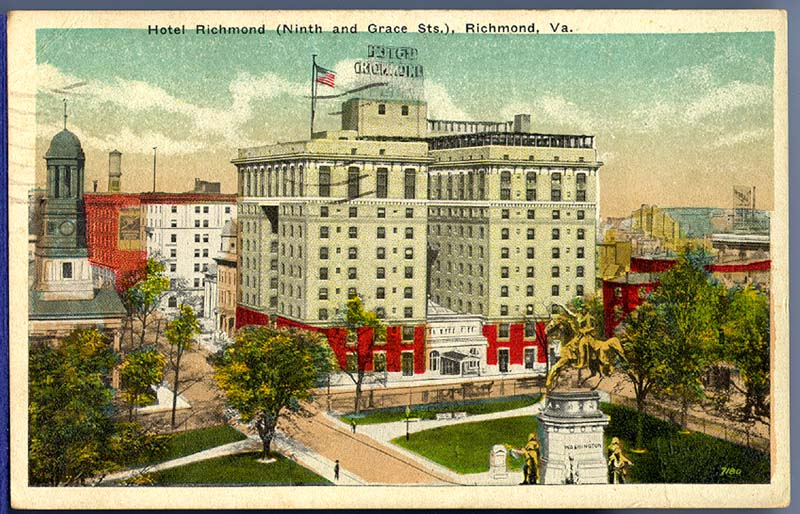
Albright's Hotel Richmond, Richmond, Virginia

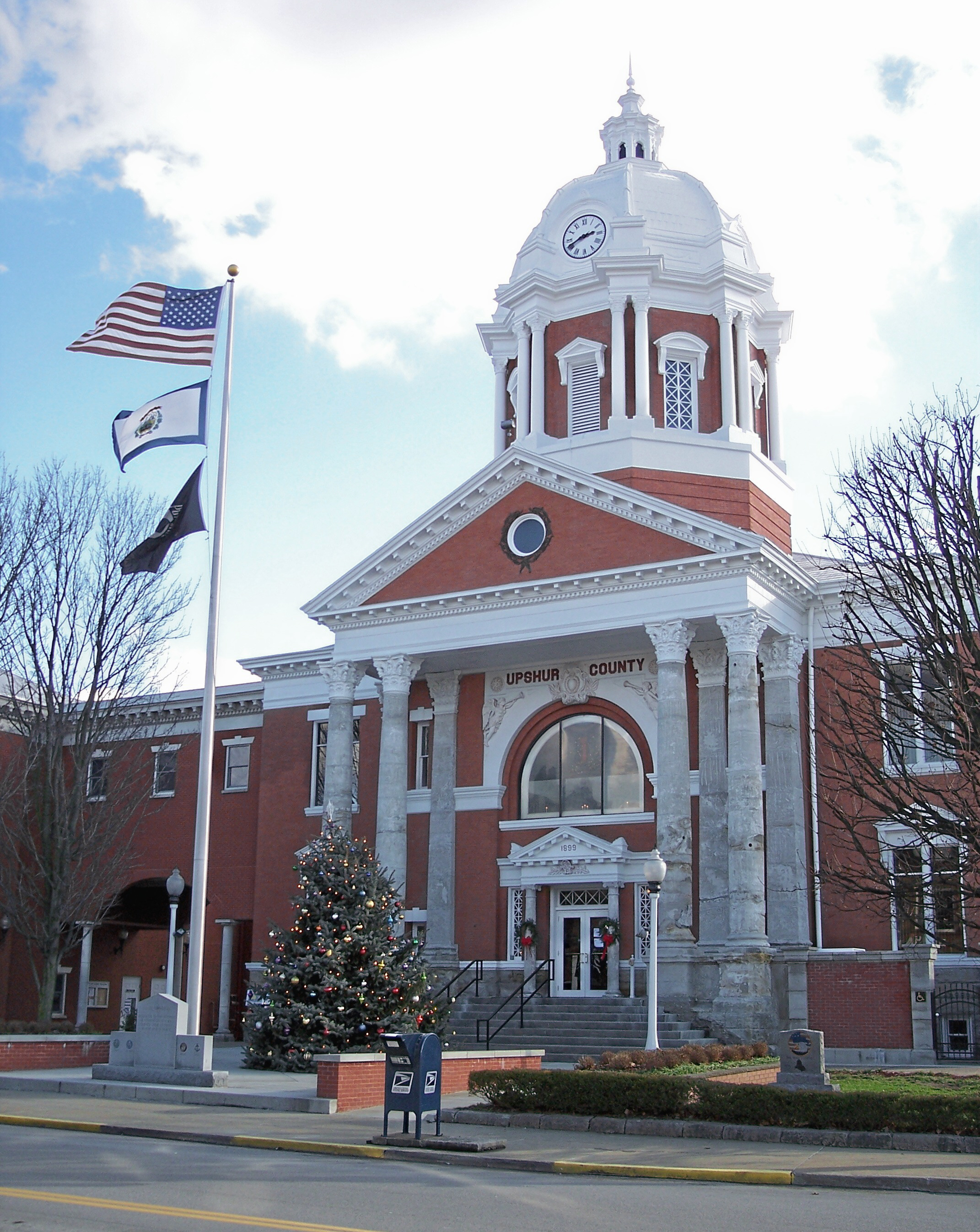
Upshur County Court House, Buckhannon, West Virginia built 1899-1901.

Harrison Albright (May 17, 1866 – January 3, 1932) was an American architect best known for his design of the West Baden Springs Hotel in Orange County, Indiana.

== Biography ==
Born in the Ogontz neighborhood of North Philadelphia, Pennsylvania, Albright was educated in the local public schools and at the Peirce College of Business and Spring Garden Institute in Philadelphia. In 1886, he began his architecture business designing residential and public projects in Philadelphia.

He moved to Charleston, West Virginia, in 1891 and was architect for the State of West Virginia in addition to designing residential projects. As State architect he designed an annex to the State Capitol, a state asylum at Huntington, West Virginia, the Miners' Hospital in Fairmont, West Virginia, and buildings at Shepherd University and the Preparatory Branch of West Virginia University at Keyser.

In 1901, he was hired by Indiana hotelier Lee Wiley Sinclair to design the landmark West Baden Springs Hotel which included a 200-foot-diameter (61 m) steel and glass dome.

In 1905, he moved his architectural practice to California, working in Los Angeles and San Diego, as an early proponent of reinforced concrete construction.

John L. Wright, son of Frank Lloyd Wright, was employed in the Albright firm.

Harrison Albright retired from architecture for health reasons in 1925 and died in 1932 at age 65.

== Works ==
Albright's designs include:

- Citizens' National Bank Building, southwest corner 3rd & Main, Los Angeles, 1897 (demolished, now site of Ronald Reagan State Office Building)
- One Bridge Place, Charleston, West Virginia, 1898
- Upshur County Courthouse, Buckhannon, West Virginia, 1901
- West Baden Springs Hotel, 1902
- Hotel Richmond, Richmond, Virginia, 1904
- expansion of Homer Laughlin Building Annex/Lyon Building, Los Angeles, California, 1905
- Santa Fe Freight Depot, Los Angeles, California (now home to the Southern California Institute of Architecture), 1907
- Coronado Library, Coronado, California, 1909
- U. S. Grant Hotel, San Diego, California, 1910
- Eli P. Clark Hotel, Los Angeles, 1912
- Spreckels Theater Building, San Diego, California, 1912
- Golden West Hotel, San Diego, 1913
- Spreckels Organ Pavilion, San Diego, California, 1915
- Bank of Coronado Building, Coronado, California, 1917
- Adams School, Maricopa, Arizona
- Spreckels Mansion, Coronado, California
- Waldo Hotel, Clarksburg, West Virginia
- Columbus Power House, Columbus, Indiana
