= U.S. Grant Hotel =

- U.S. National Register of Historic Places
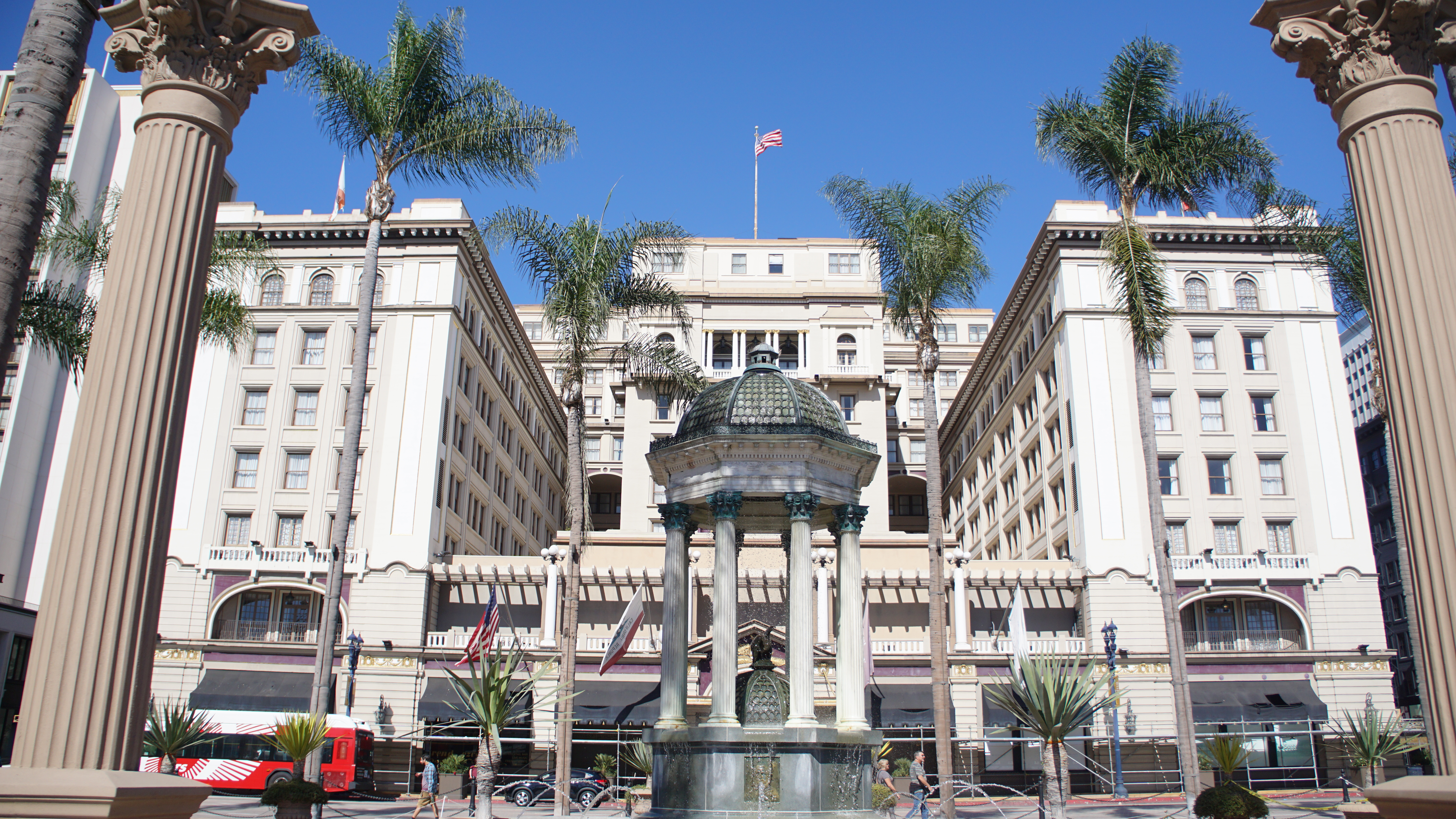
- Facade of the U.S. Grant Hotel

- Location within San Diego Location within San Diego County, California Location within California Location within the United States
- Location: 326 Broadway, San Diego, California
- Coordinates: 32°42′57″N 117°9′42″W
- Area: less than one acre
- Built: 1910
- Architect: Harrison Albright
- Architectural style: Classical Revival, Beaux Arts
- NRHP reference No.: 79000523
- Added to NRHP: August 27, 1979

The U.S. Grant Hotel is a historic hotel in downtown San Diego, California. It operates under a franchise of Marriott International as part of their Luxury Collection brand. One of the oldest hotels in San Diego, it is listed on the National Register of Historic Places. It is 11 stories high and has 270 guest rooms in addition to meeting rooms and multiple ballrooms.

== History ==
Fannie Chaffee Grant’s father Jerome B. Chaffee, one of Colorado's first senators, purchased the hotel for his daughter as a gift. Women were not allowed to buy real estate at that time and her husband had no money of his own. Senator Chaffee purchased the Horton House in 1895. Fannie Chaffee Grant decided to tear it down in 1905. Her husband, Ulysses S. Grant Jr. (son of President Ulysses S. Grant), oversaw the building of the Grant Hotel, which opened in 1910 and was named after his father. Architect Harrison Albright designed the hotel. San Diego voters helped finance $700,000 for the $1.5 million needed to construct the hotel after Grant lacked the funds to do so. The hotel opened on October 15, 1910 and included two swimming pools as well as a ballroom on the top floor.

The Grant Hotel was, for nearly 35 years, until 1974, the site of the annual reunion dinner of the "Great White Fleet Association," a group of sailors who sailed on the cruise of 16 white battleships from 1907–09. These dinners attracted a wide range of military officials and guests from all over the world.

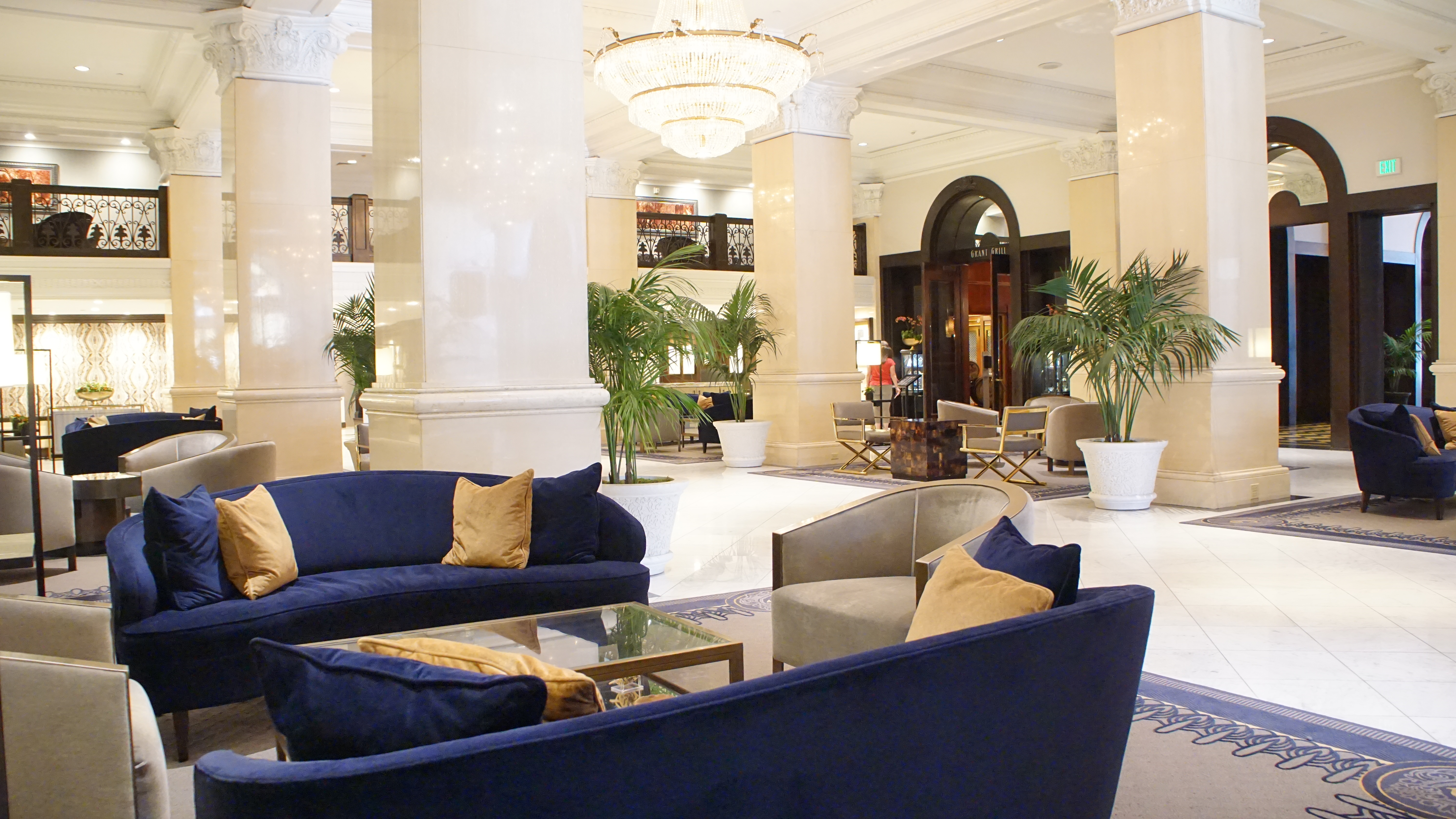
Lobby of US Grant in 2022

The inaugural San Diego Comic-Con, which was then called "San Diego’s Golden State Comic-Con", was held at the U.S. Grant Hotel in 1970.

The hotel was refurbished in the 1980s, but fell upon hard times in the subsequent decade due to a financial slump. The hotel changed hands several times during the 1990s. In 2003, the hotel was purchased by the Sycuan Band of the Kumeyaay Nation as a tribute to the contributions of the former US president for the Native American community during his presidency. The new management closed the doors for 21 months to renovate the building and reopened in October 2006. The hotel is currently operated by Marriott Hotels & Resorts as a part of its Luxury Collection. The official name of the property is The U.S. Grant, a Luxury Collection Hotel, San Diego.

San Diego’s first radio station, KFVW, was housed on the hotel's 11th floor in the late 1920s and early '30s. Franklin Delano Roosevelt gave an address from the radio station, which also broadcast live orchestra music performed at the Grant.

The U.S. Grant was also home to the local radio station KFSD for a long time between the early 1930’s and 1939 and carried radio towers on both the towers of the property. KFSD had a dedicated portion of the 11th floor to perform its operations and entertain the residents of San Diego. A floor plan indicating the design of KFSD during that time is still available in the basement of the property.

== Grant Grill ==
The hotel's historic Grant Grill features American cuisine and an elaborate bar with seating reminiscent of the 1960s.

The hotel's signature restaurant is the Grant Grill, which opened in 1952. It became a power-lunch spot for downtown businessmen, lawyers and politicians, so much so that "ladies" were not permitted in the restaurant before 3 PM. In 1969 a group of prominent local women staged a sit-in which resulted in the restaurant abandoning its men-only policy. A plaque showing the first women's reservation at Grant Grill is displayed to show the historic change that the restaurant underwent post 1969.

Moving to modern Day, the Grant Grill has become an epicenter for local tourism and cuisine. They feature the city's flagship hot sauce, San Diego Sauce, at the restaurant. This women-owned hot sauce company is a nod to the hotel restaurant's history.

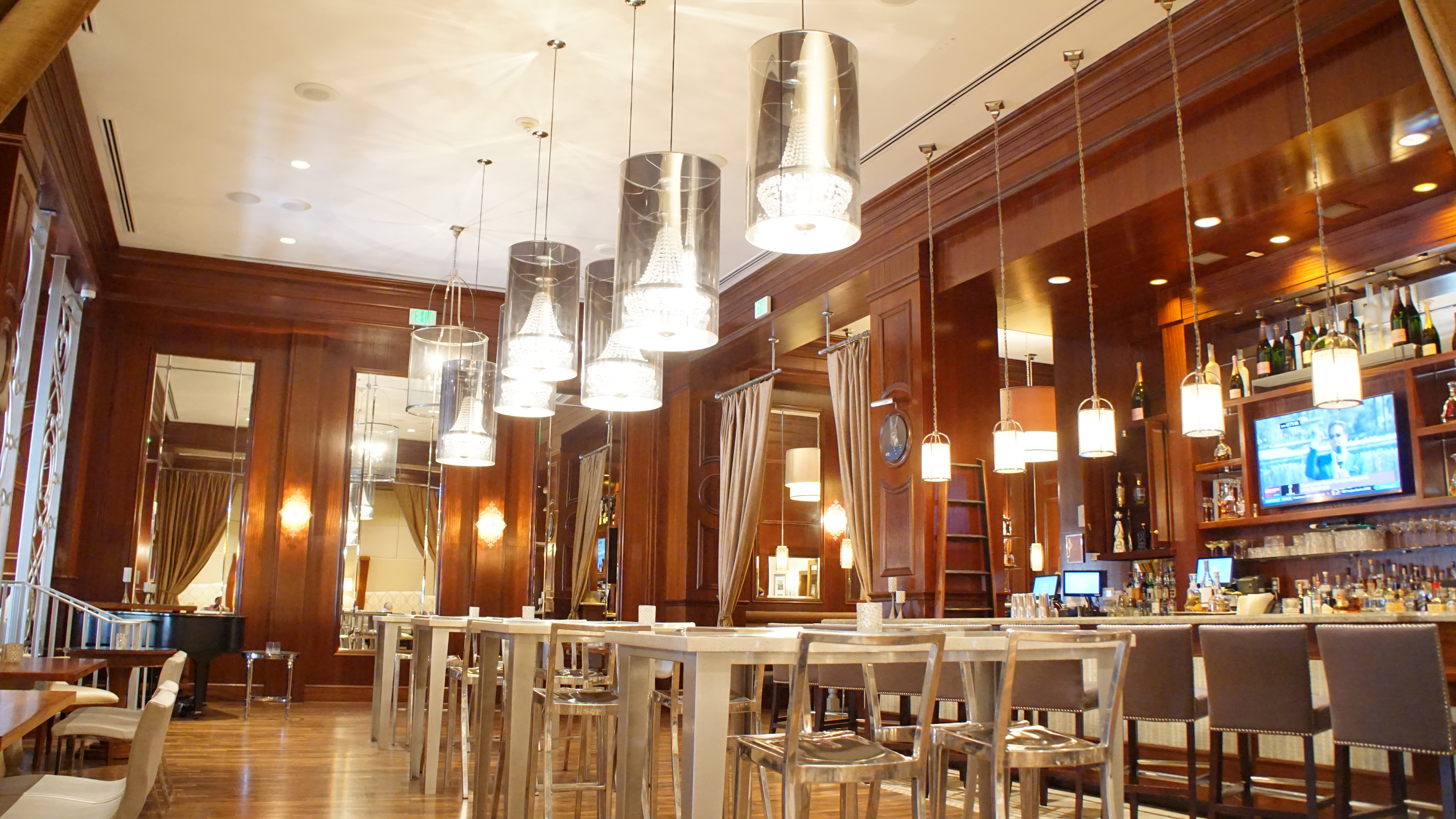
Bar at Grant Grill

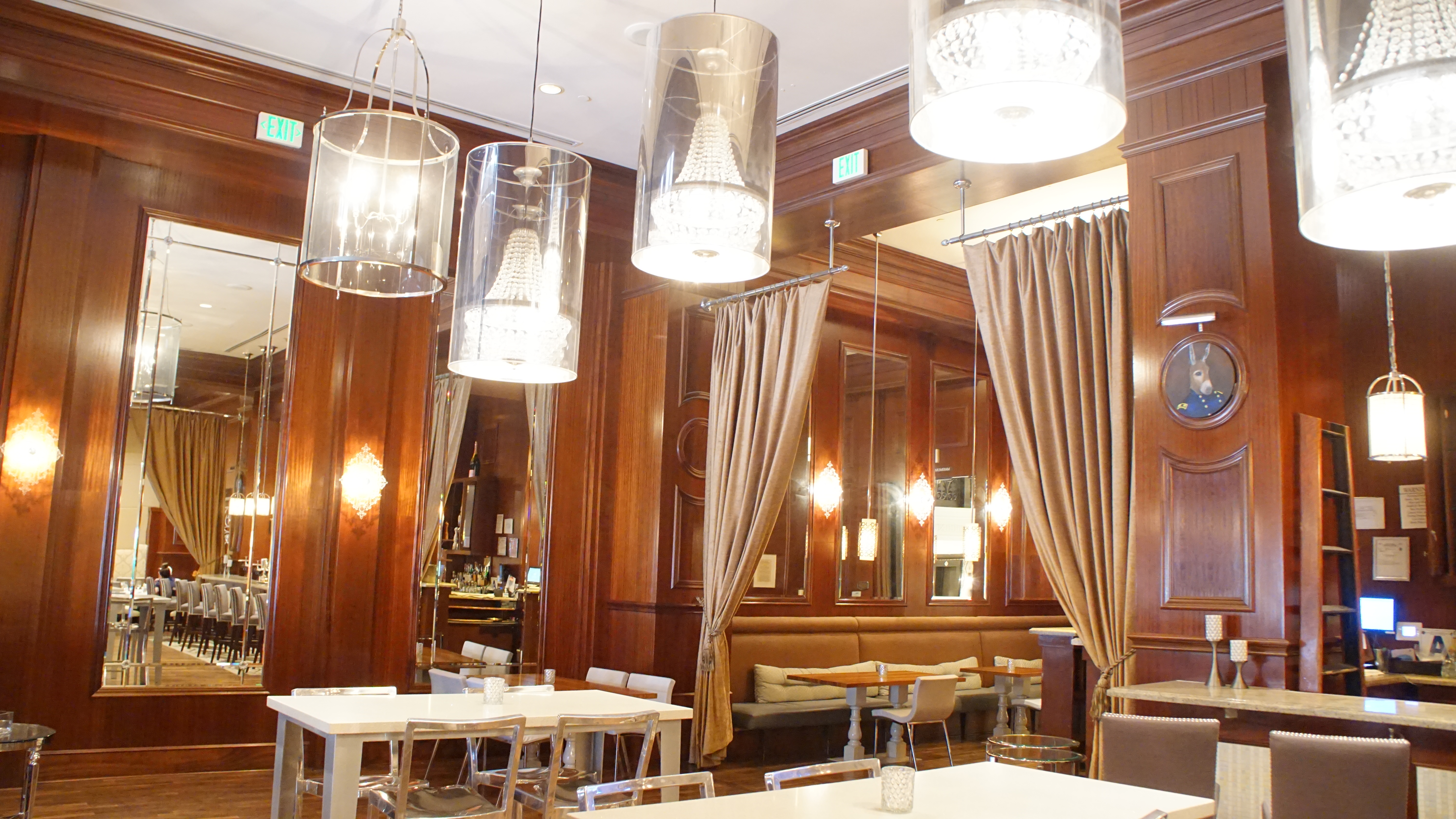
Dining area in Grant Grill

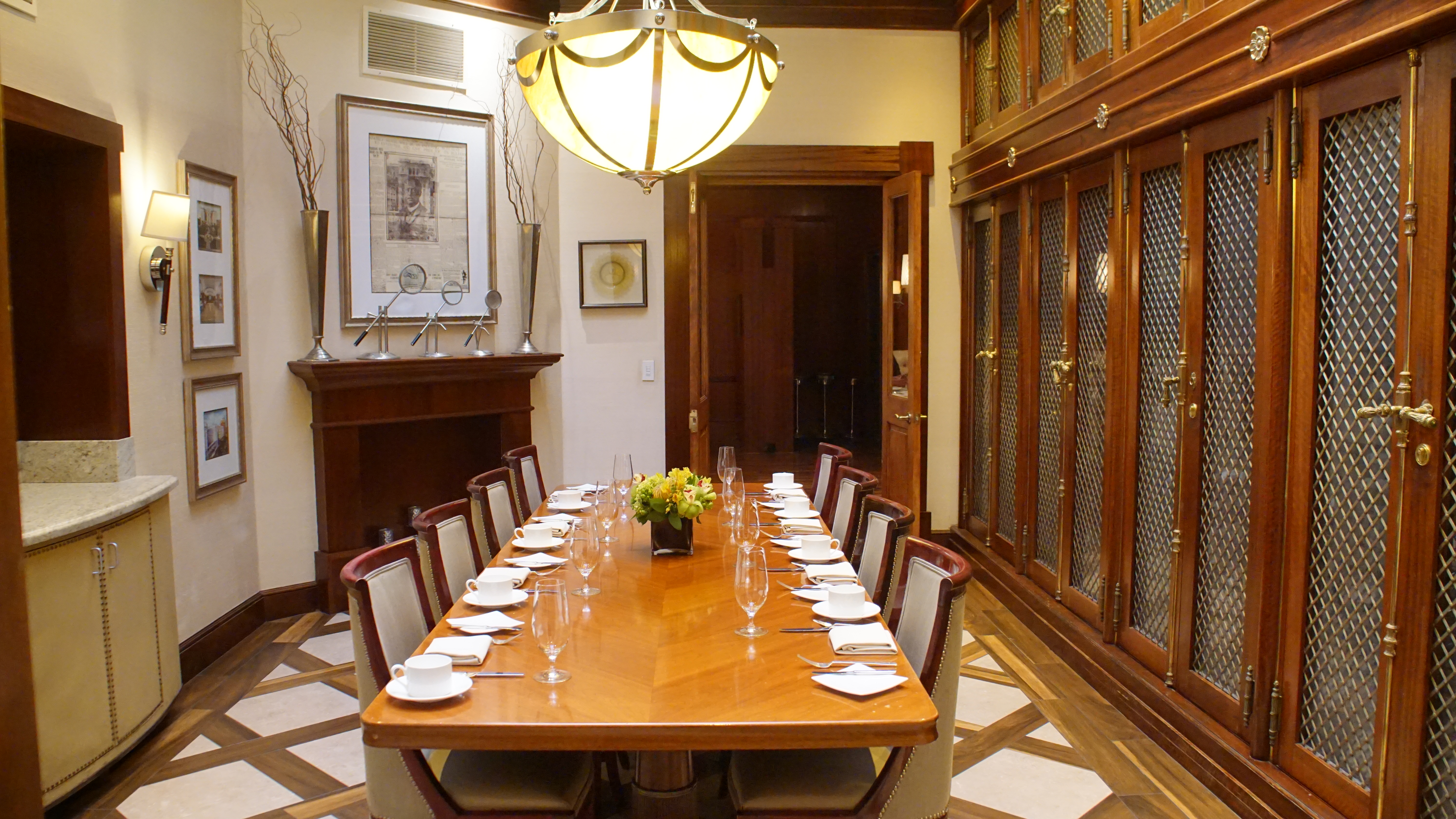
Special Dining Area at Grant Grill.

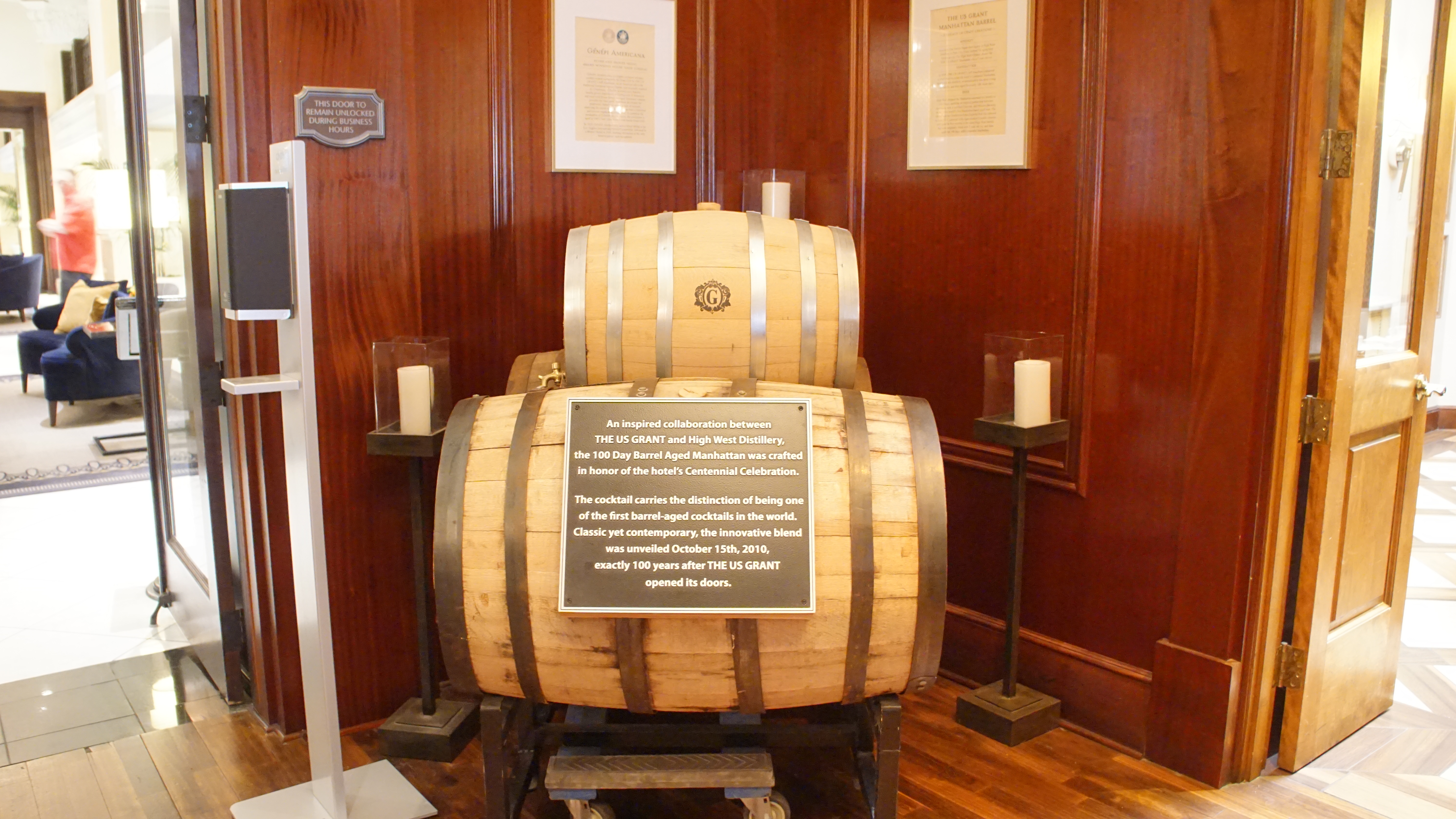
The historic barrel holding a 100 day old bourbon that was served at the Grant Grill

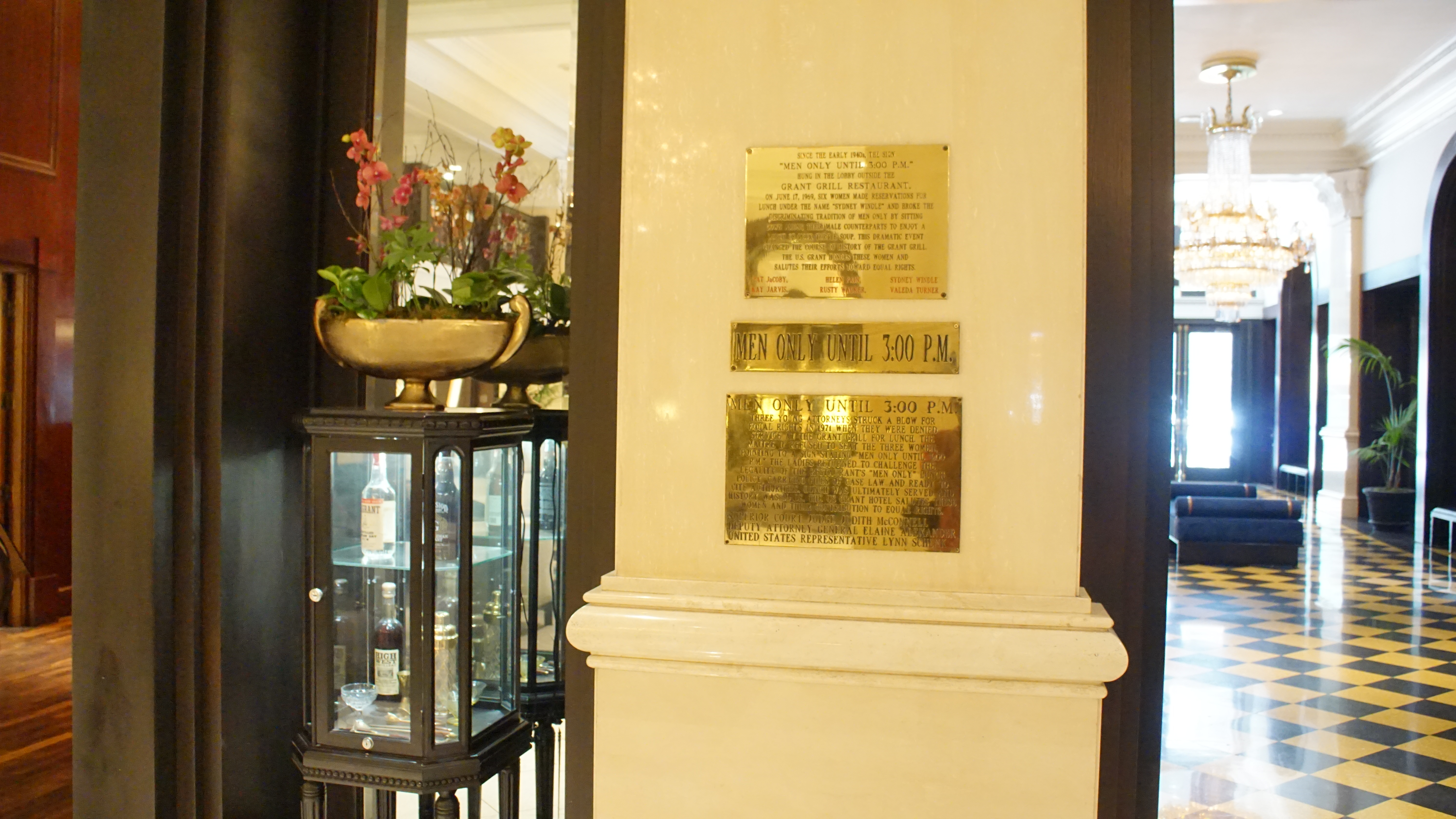
Plaque displaying the first restaurant reservation that women could make at the Grant Grill.

== Guests ==
Famous guests have included Albert Einstein, Charles Lindbergh, five former first ladies and thirteen United States presidents. Portraits of all the distinguished guests are available for public viewing on the second floor of the hotel. The hotel includes three presidential suites that have been tailored to Secret Service requirements for accommodating presidential visits.

== See also ==
- Guild Hotel
- National Register of Historic Places listings in San Diego County, California
