= Adeline Atkinson =

American businessperson (1841–1916)

- Born: Adeline Detroit Wood; July 30, 1841; Bedford County, Virginia, U.S.
- Died: December 11, 1916 (aged 75); Richmond, Virginia, U.S.
- Resting place: Hollywood Cemetery; Richmond, Virginia
- Other names: A.D. Atkinson
- Occupations: Businessperson; hotelier
- Known for: Hotel Richmond
- Spouse: John M. Atkinson (died 1894)
- Children: 6

Adeline Detroit "A. D." Atkinson (née Wood; July 30, 1841 – December 11, 1916) was an American hotelier.

== Early life ==
Adeline Detroit Wood was born on July 30, 1841, to Sarah Ann (née White) and William Wood in Bedford County, Virginia.

== Personal life ==
At the age of 19, she married John M. Atkinson. John Atkinson enlisted in the 11th Virginia Infantry Regiment and served with the Confederates in the Civil War. They moved to Lynchburg after he was paroled at the end of the war. Her husband died on November 6, 1894. Together, they had six children, three sons and three daughters.

She was known professionally as "A.D. Atkinson".

== Career ==
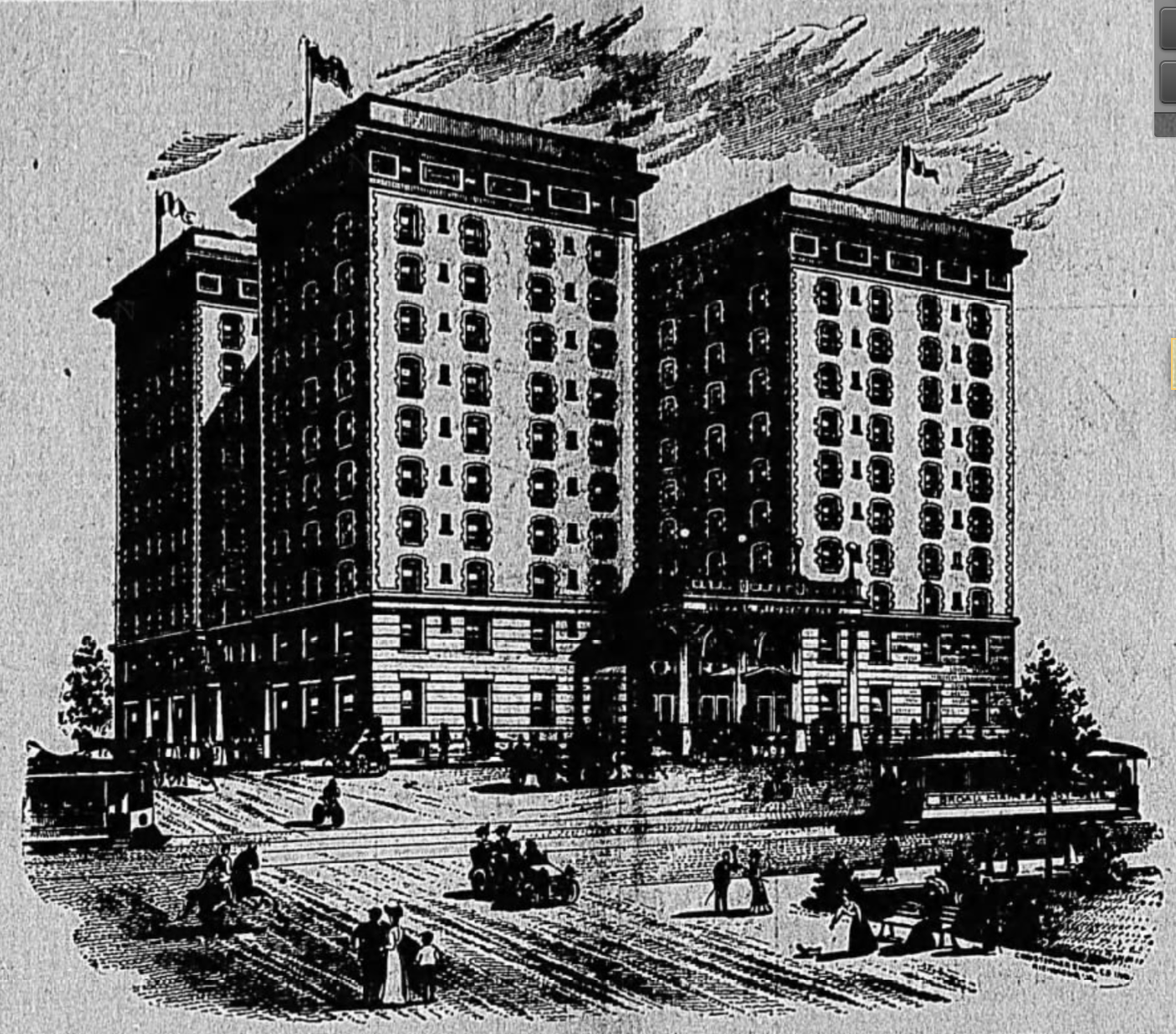
Drawing of Hotel Richmond, c. 1905

In the mid-1870's, Atkinson's husband's income as a bricklayer was insufficient to support their growing family, so she took on boarders. By 1881, her business was doing so well that she opened the Warwick House hotel on Main Street in Lynchburg. The Warwick House was a Confederate hospital during the war.

As her husband's health declined, they moved to Richmond. In 1884, she took over the struggling Saint James Hotel. By 1889, she became the proprietor of the American Hotel, which she renamed the Lexington in 1894. On April 25, 1903, Atkinson sold the Lexington to A. G. Spratley and J. L. Rodwell.

As she was selling the Lexington, she purchased the Saint Clair Hotel, at the corner of Ninth and Grace Street in Richmond. She destroyed it and in its place built the Hotel Richmond with a 140-room capacity. Hotel Richmond opened on April 4, 1904, and was successful, competing with the popular Jefferson Hotel. The hotel did so well that in 1912, Atkinson doubled its capacity and its value was estimated to be almost $1 million.

She brought her sons in to help manage Hotel Richmond, but remained in charge until her health declined in 1916.

== Death ==
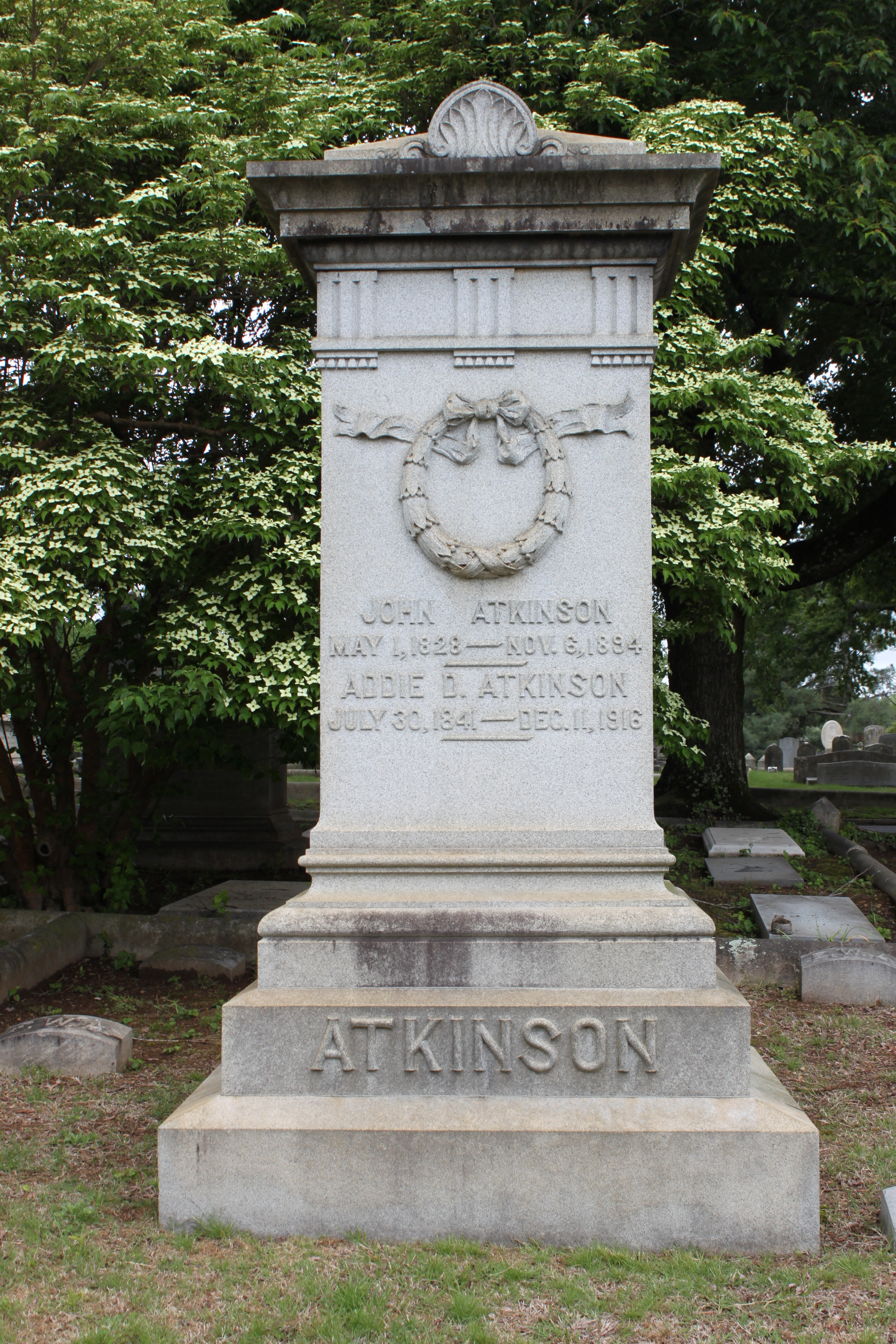
Grave of Atkinson and her husband at Hollywood Cemetery

Atkinson died about midnight on the evening of December 11, 1916, at the Hotel Richmond. She is buried at Hollywood Cemetery in Richmond.

== Legacy ==
Hotel Richmond was threatened to be demolished in 2005, but was placed on the Virginia Landmarks Register and National Register of Historic Places in 2009. It was restored in 2016.

== See also ==
- Hotel Richmond
