= Spreckels Theatre =

- Spreckels Theatre Building
- U.S. National Register of Historic Places
- San Diego Historic Landmark
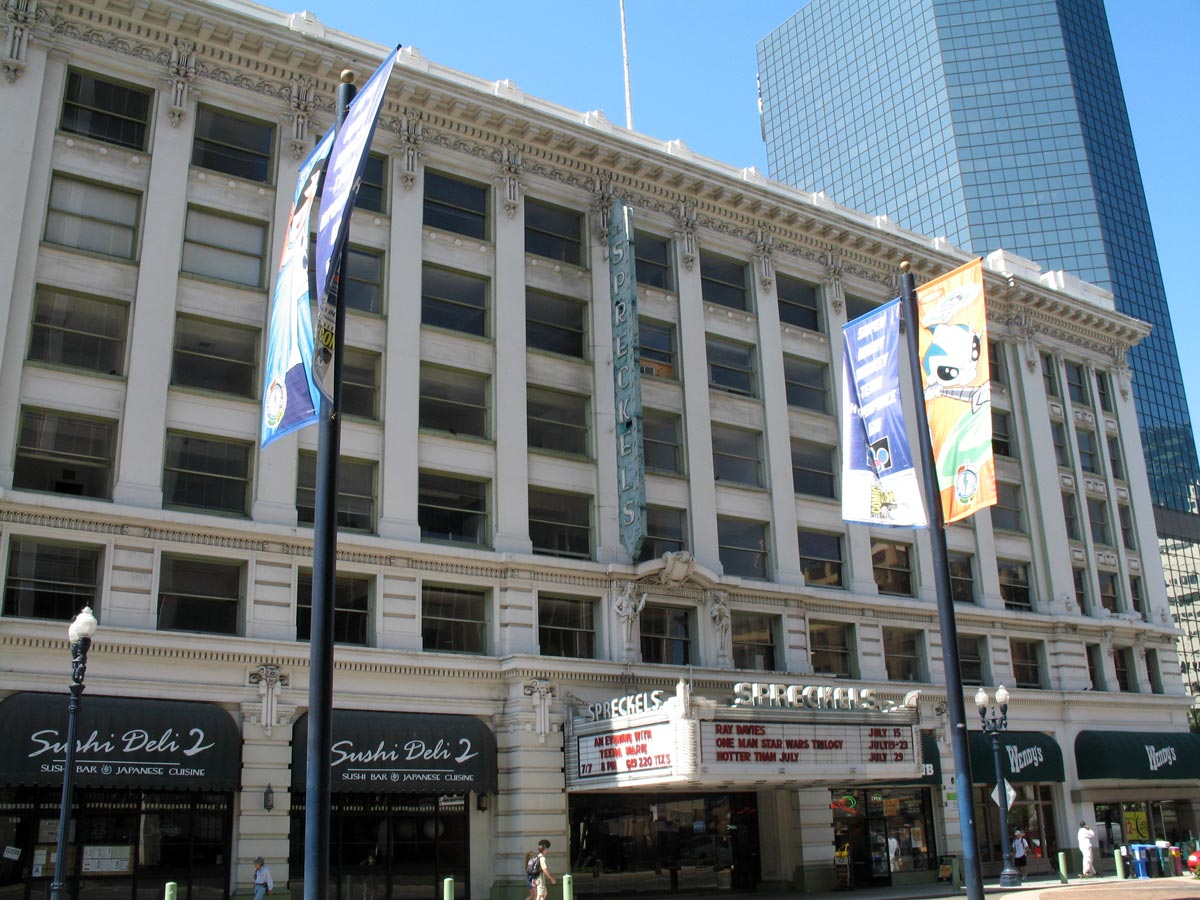
- Spreckels Theatre in July 2006
- Location: San Diego, California
- Built: 1912
- Architect: Harrison Albright
- Architectural style: Chicago-style
- NRHP reference No.: 75000467
- SDHL No.: 76

Significant dates
- Added to NRHP: 1975
- Designated SDHL: August 4, 1972

Spreckels Theatre is a performing arts center in San Diego, California. It was touted as "the first modern commercial playhouse west of the Mississippi". It was designed for philanthropist John D. Spreckels, and was meant to commemorate the opening of the Panama Canal. Built in 1912, it was originally created to host live theater performances, but was converted to allow motion pictures in 1931. The theater has been closed since being sold in 2021. There are currently plans to renovate the building.

== Architecture ==
Architect Harrison Albright designed the Spreckels Theater for the city's premier philanthropist, sugar heir John D. Spreckels. The building, which opened on August 23, 1912, was constructed to commemorate the opening of the Panama Canal. As with many west coast buildings from this era, it is constructed of reinforced concrete and concrete panels with architectural terra cotta manufactured by Gladding, McBean. The six-story building has a marquee over the main entrance. The theater is a 1,915-seat auditorium with an ornate Baroque interior. The auditorium is open with no pillars or columns to obstruct sightlines. The number of seats was chosen to correspond with the Panama–California Exposition year (1915). The stage is 82 feet x 58 feet, and was one of the largest stages ever constructed.

== History ==
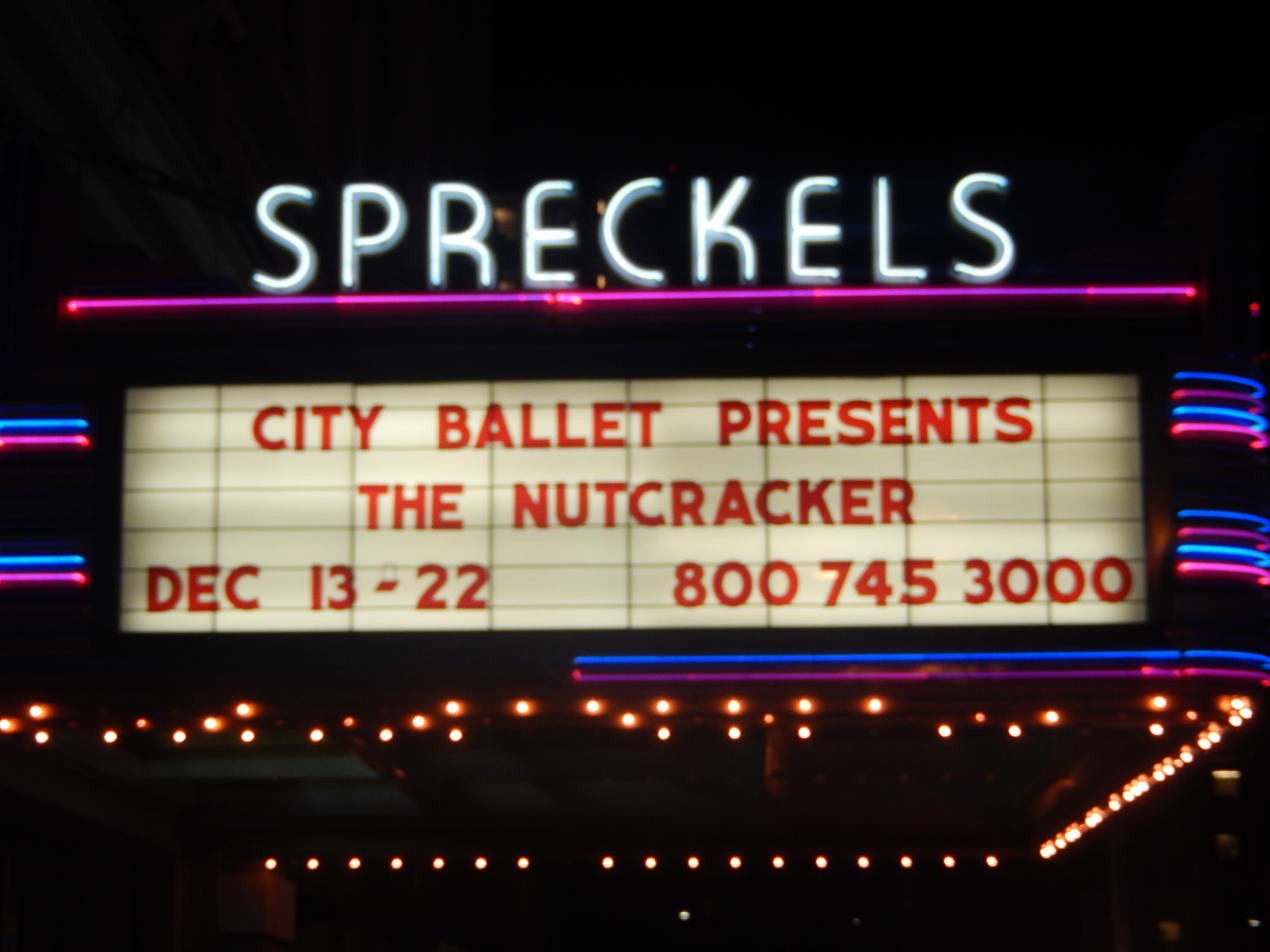
Spreckels sign at night (2013)

The theater originally presented live theatrical productions. Notable performers at the Spreckels included Enrico Caruso, John Barrymore, Al Jolson, Will Rogers, and Abbott and Costello.

In 1931, it was converted into a first-run motion picture house by its then-owner Louis B. Metzger.

In 1976, owner/operator Jacquelyn Littlefield (Metzger's daughter) restored it to a live theater format, bringing touring Broadway shows to San Diego in cooperation with the Nederlander Organization.

When fire destroyed San Diego's Old Globe Theatre in 1978, the Spreckels hosted the Globe's 1978-79 season.

Between July 2015 and July 2019, TBS has rented the theater for a week for Conan O'Brien to host his self-titled talk show from the theater to correspond with that year's San Diego Comic-Con. There are four tapings that occur, which each episode airing the following evening. Casts from several big name television shows have appeared such as Breaking Bad, Top Gun: Maverick, Veronica Mars, and It Chapter Two.

== Today ==
San Diego's Spreckels Building was listed on the National Register of Historic Places in 1975. It is currently closed indefinitely.

== Past Performers ==
- Arcade Fire
- Cocteau Twins
- George Arliss
- William Powell
- Bill "Bojangles" Robinson
- Ronald Colman
- Arthur Rubinstein
- Bela Lugosi
- Ed Wynn
- Bert Lahr
- Ronald Reagan
- Eva Le Gallienne
- Honi Coles
- Carol Shelly
- Jean-Pierre Rampal
- Julian Bream
- Burt Lancaster
- Chris Isaak
- Rickie Lee Jones
- Bobby Caldwell
- Kenny Loggins
- Linda Lavin
- Los Lobos
- Jason Mraz
- Jamie Foxx
- Jeffrey Osborne
- David Bowie
- Bryan Adams
- Dave Koz
- The Doobie Brothers
- Todd Rungren
- Sammy Hagar
- Chaka Khan
- Sarah McLachlan
- Béla Fleck
- Alice Cooper
- Fiona Apple
- Hootie & the Blowfish
- Smashing Pumpkins
- David Sanborn
- John Cleese
- Shane Gillis
- Dave Chappelle
- Margaret Cho
- Lisa Lampanelli
- David Brenner
- Eddie Griffin
- Ghost
- Ellen DeGeneres
- George Lopez
- Rita Rudner
- The D'Oyly Carte Opera Company
- The Martha Graham Dance Company
- The Royal Shakespeare Company
- The Moscow Art Theatre, Ballet Folklorico de Mexico
- The Paul Whiteman Orchestra
- The Kirov Ballet
- The Alvin Alley Dance Company
- The Harlem Boys Choir
- Jane's Addiction
