= Marcellus E. Wright Sr. =

American architect (1881–1962)

Marcellus Eugene Wright Sr.
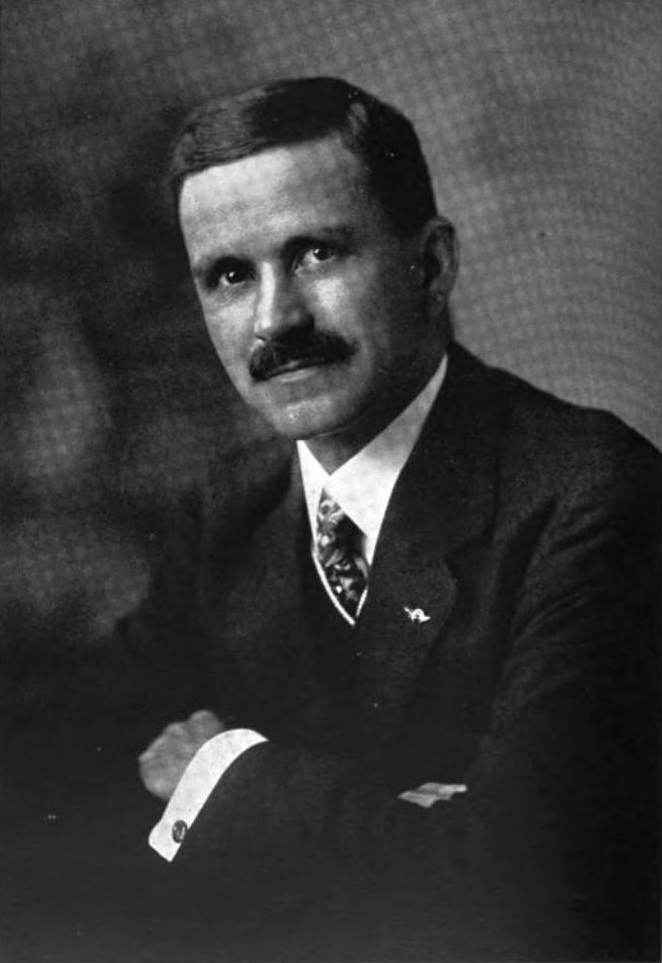
- Born: April 8, 1881; Hanover County, Virginia, U.S.
- Died: December 7, 1962 (aged 81); Richmond, Virginia, U.S.
- Resting place: Hollywood Cemetery
- Occupation: Architect
- Spouse: Ritta Brink Stovall
- Children: 2
- Buildings: Altria Theater, The Chamberlin, Hotel John Marshall
- Projects: Colonial Williamsburg

Marcellus Eugene Wright Sr. (April 8, 1881 – December 7, 1962) was an American architect. He was active in Richmond, Virginia and the surrounding region during the first half of the 20th century. In addition to his work on hotels, Wright was a pioneer of the Moorish Revival architectural style in his design for the Altria Theater (formerly known as the Mosque), which is a major component of the Monroe Park Historic District.

== Personal life ==
Marcellus E. Wright was born on April 8, 1881, in Hanover County, Virginia, the son of Anthony Westley Wright and Isabella Wright (née Granger). His father was a Confederate veteran who saw military service during the American Civil War at the Battle of Gaines's Mill.

In 1906, Marcellus Wright married Ritta Brink Stovall at a ceremony which took place in Henrico County, Virginia. The marriage resulted in two children: Marcellus Eugene Wright Jr. and Frances Stovall Wright. Marcellus Wright Sr. was active in local politics as a member of the Democratic Party, and with his wife was involved in the Church of Christ, Scientist. He died on December 7, 1962, of what were reported to be natural causes, and is buried in Hollywood Cemetery.

Multiple members of the Wright family went on to make a name for themselves in architecture. In 1936, Marcellus E. Wright Jr. joined his father's architectural firm; he later became a leading light of Virginia architecture as a principal of Marcellus Wright Cox & Smith. Oscar Pendleton Wright, brother to the senior Wright, entered into partnership with noted Richmond firm Carneal & Johnston, where he worked on local projects such as St. Joseph's Villa.

During his life, Marcellus Wright Sr. served as an active member of the Sons of the American Revolution, and from 1939 to 1940 was President of its Richmond Chapter. He was also a Freemason, having attained the thirty-second degree in the Scottish Rite.

== Career ==
At the age of sixteen, Wright began work for Richmond architecture firm Noland and Baskervill, where he stayed for five years before moving to the Philadelphia firm Cope and Stewardson. He received his education from the Virginia Mechanics Institute, the Philadelphia School of Applied Art, and the University of Pennsylvania, the last of which he graduated from in 1905. After graduating, Wright swiftly rose to prominence in the Richmond architecture scene; he was one of the eleven founding members of the Richmond Association of Architects, which was established in 1911. By 1922, he had attained sufficient stature to have been elected a member of the American Institute of Architects.

In April 1925, a collaboration between Marcellus Wright, Paul Philippe Cret, and Berthold Nebel produced the winning entry for a contest to design the Virginia War Memorial. Construction proceeded to the point of laying foundations before the project was scrapped. A carillon designed by Ralph Adams Cram was erected in its stead.

Through the 1930s, Wright served on the Architectural Advisory Committee which presided over the Colonial Williamsburg restoration.

Local architect Beth Nickels was hired to join Wright's firm in 1947 as a draftsman and project manager. Nickels was recognized by the Times-Dispatch as the first female architect from Richmond and one of the first from Virginia.

== Selected works ==
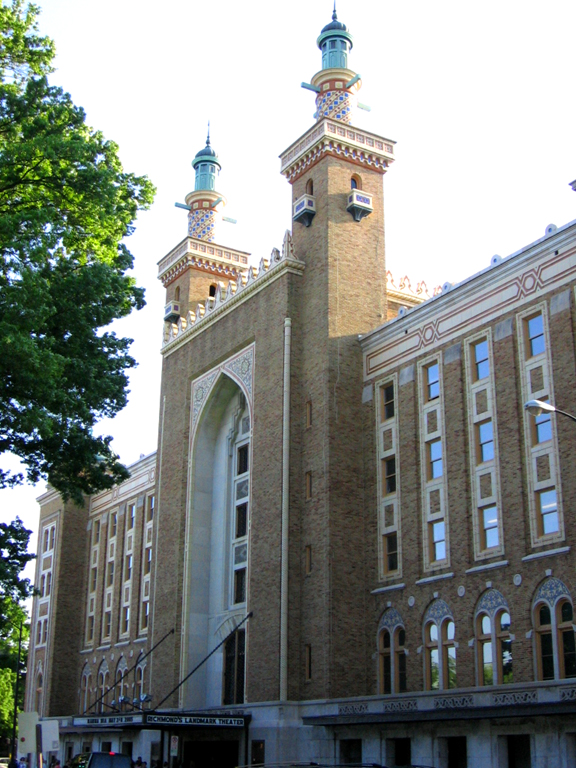
The Altria Theater.

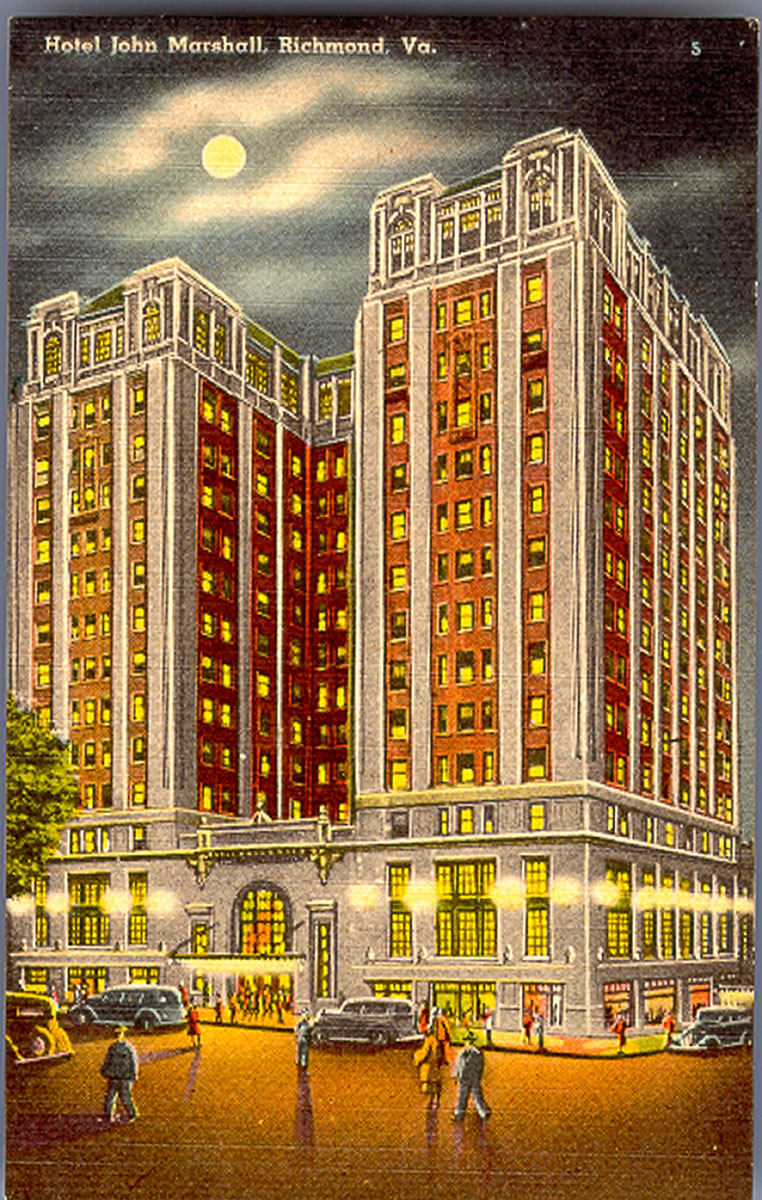
The Hotel John Marshall.

Marcellus Wright's works include:

- The Altria Theater (1925), dedicated originally for use by the Shriners and operated as the Acca Temple Shrine; due to its multiple minarets and domes the building was known for years as "the Mosque." It was designed in partnership with fellow Virginia architect Charles M. Robinson. In consideration for listing by the National Register of Historic Places, the Mosque was described as "an architectural fantasy on Moorish themes...a perfect example of turn-of-the-century American eclecticism."
- The William Byrd Hotel (1925), the first hotel designed by Marcellus E. Wright. Located across from Broad Street Station, the William Byrd Hotel was described by the Richmond News Leader as "a monument to Richmond energy, talent, and progressiveness." In 1996, the former hotel was reopened as an apartment building.
- The Wright Pavilion (1927), a component of the Blue Ridge Sanatorium which was sponsored by the Grand Lodge of Virginia and named in honor of Masonic leader George C. Wright. With capacity for sixty beds, the Pavilion was built to aid treatment of tuberculosis as part of the state-run tuberculosis sanatorium. In exchange for funding, members of the Grand Lodge obtained preference in admittance to the state-run facility, and any major changes had to seek Grand Lodge approval. This project marked Wright's second major collaboration with Charles M. Robinson, as Robinson was responsible for the Sanatorium's initial planning.
- The Chamberlin (1928), formerly known as the Chamberlin Hotel and originally as the Chamberlin-Vanderbilt Hotel due to financial backing from the Vanderbilt family. Designed in the Beaux-Arts style and opened as a luxury resort on the Chesapeake Bay, the building is now in use as a retirement home catering to U.S. veterans.
- The Hotel John Marshall (1929), an upscale fixture of downtown Richmond. Its main U-shaped structure originally was topped by a terracotta cornice, and rests upon a three-story limestone base. Since 2011, the former hotel has completed renovations and now functions as luxury apartments. Gubernatorial election festivities were held at the Hotel John Marshall by Virginia Governors-Elect Linwood Holton and Douglas Wilder. On other occasions, the hotel played host to multiple Presidents of the United States, including Franklin Roosevelt, Harry Truman, Dwight D. Eisenhower, Richard Nixon, Gerald Ford, Jimmy Carter, and Ronald Reagan.
- The Parcel Post Building (1933), constructed under the aegis of the Public Works Administration. Wright collaborated with the Richmond firm of Lee, Smith & Vandervoort in order to design the building, drawing up plans that were heavily revised due to the ongoing Great Depression. A private bill for the relief of the architects was debated in the 74th United States Congress. The Parcel Post Building is currently maintained as part of the Lewis F. Powell Jr. United States Courthouse.
- Lunenburg's Old County Courthouse (1939), originally built in 1827, modified and expanded by Marcellus Wright. The external stairs of the building are the most visible extant portion of Wright's expansion.
- The Terminal Building of Richmond International Airport (1950), which at the time was named after Virginia aviator Richard E. Byrd. Marcellus Wright Sr. was still active with his architecture firm at this time, providing political cover for his son's more Modernist style. The younger Wright, after assuming responsibility for day-to-day operations of the firm, would later remark that the design of the Terminal Building was one of the least favorite of his career due to compromises that he was required to make.
