= William Byrd Hotel =

Historic building in Virginia, US

- U.S. National Register of Historic Places
- Virginia Landmarks Register
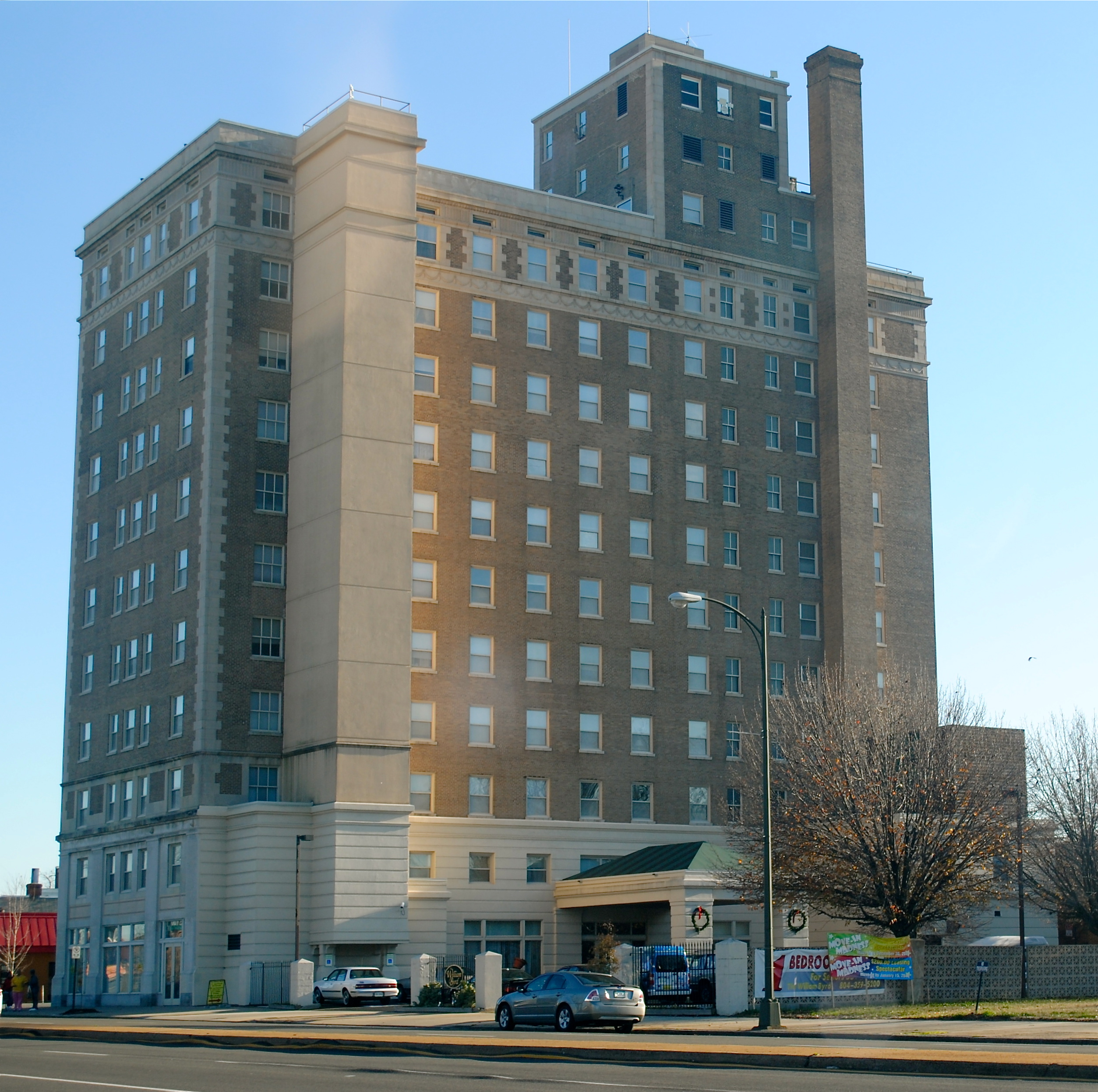
- William Byrd Hotel, December 2011

- Location within Virginia Location within the United States
- Location: 2501 W. Broad St., Richmond, Virginia
- Coordinates: 37°33′36″N 77°28′1″W
- Area: 0.5 acres (0.20 ha)
- Built: 1925
- Architect: Marcellus E. Wright Sr.
- Architectural style: Classical Revival
- NRHP reference No.: 96001454
- VLR No.: 127-0466

Significant dates
- Added to NRHP: December 16, 1996
- Designated VLR: September 18, 1996

William Byrd Hotel is a historic hotel building located in Richmond, Virginia. It was built in 1925, and is an 11-story, Classical Revival-style building consisting of a base, shaft and capital. It is a steel frame building clad in limestone, buff brick, and with terra cotta decorative elements. The building is topped by a three-story penthouse with a one-story addition. The hotel ceased operation in the 1980s, and the building was renovated into apartments in 1996. As of 2017, the William Byrd Apartments were owned by Project: Homes, a regional nonprofit dedicated to providing housing for low-income seniors.

It was listed on the National Register of Historic Places in 1996.
