= Laurel Street Methodist Church =

Church in Richmond, Virginia, United States

- The church in 1899
- Laurel Street Methodist Church
- 37.540324°N 77.451522°W
- Location: Laurel and Albemarle streets, Oregon Hill, Richmond, Virginia
- Country: United States
- Denomination: The Methodist Church
- Previous denomination: Methodist Episcopal Church, South

History
- Former name(s): Oregon Methodist Episcopal Church, South
- Status: Destroyed
- Founded: 1849
- Consecrated: January 1887

Architecture
- Functional status: Defunct; merged into St. Andrew's United Methodist Church (1968)
- Architect: Albert L. West
- Style: Gothic Revival
- Groundbreaking: June 22, 1880 (cornerstone laid)
- Demolished: January 15, 1968 (destroyed by fire)

Laurel Street Methodist Church was a Methodist congregation and church building in the Oregon Hill neighborhood of Richmond, Virginia, United States. Organized in 1849 as the Oregon Methodist Episcopal Church, South, it was the fifth Methodist congregation founded in Richmond.

In 1880-1881 the congregation moved from Church Street, in the eastern part of Oregon Hill, to a new building at Laurel and Albemarle streets designed by the Richmond architect Albert L. West. The building was destroyed by arson on January 15, 1968, after which the congregation merged with Grace Methodist Church to form St. Andrew’s United Methodist Church in Richmond’s West End. The City of Richmond acquired the site in 1971 to establish a public park.

== Laurel Street building ==
The cornerstone of the new church at Laurel and Albemarle streets was laid on June 22, 1880. The congregation held its first service in the building on Sunday, June 19, 1881. The Sunday school, numbering about 250 marched from the old Oregon Hill building to the new church. The building was designed by Albert L. West (1825-1892), a prominent Methodist layman who also designed Trinity Methodist Church and remodeled Centenary United Methodist Church, of which he was a member. The upper auditorium was finished in 1886. The completed church was consecrated on January 23, 1887, with three services, and the Rev. J. Powell Garland led the afternoon dedication. An account in the Richmond Christian Advocate described it as a plain Gothic brick structure with a slate roof, measuring 62 by 48 feet, with an auditorium and galleries that seat 700. Construction costs were approximately $9,000. The congregation numbered just over 300 members of modest means. About $500 was raised at the dedication, leaving roughly $200 of the building debt outstanding. According to the National Register of Historic Places nomination for the Oregon Hill Historic District, Laurel Street Methodist had the largest Sunday school in the Virginia Methodist Conference during the 1880s. The church celebrated its 50th anniversary with several days of services in October 1899.

Laurel St. Methodist Church in 1923

A new façade was added to the west front in 1909-1910. The congregation helped establish two further Richmond congregations, Monument Methodist Church and Byrd Park Methodist Church. The congregation celebrated its 100th anniversary in November 1949 when it had approximately 750 members. Mayor W. Sterling King spoke at the service.

== Destruction and merger ==
The church was destroyed by fire on the night of January 15, 1968, The blaze was attributed to arson. Photographs taken for the Richmond Times-Dispatch that night, now held by The Valentine, show firefighters working to extinguish the fire at the building at Laurel and Albemarle streets. Rather than rebuild, the congregation voted to merge with Grace Methodist Church to form St. Andrew’s United Methodist Church, off Three Chopt Road in Richmond’s West End.

== The site ==
On August 24, 1970, Richmond City Council adopted Ordinance No. 70-238-228, authorizing the city to purchase the parcel for a public park under the "Parks-in-Cities Open Space Program." The deed was recorded on April 30, 1971, for a consideration of $6,525. In 2003 the Oregon Hill Neighborhood Association petitioned the city to name the park for Robert Pleasants (1723–1801), a Virginia Quaker abolitionist. The site is now Pleasants Park.
