= Albert L. West =

American architect (1825–1892)

- Born: May 10, 1825; Laurel Grove, Chesterfield County, Virginia, U.S.
- Died: September 27, 1892 (aged 67); Richmond, Virginia, U.S.
- Resting place: Hollywood Cemetery
- Occupation: Architect
- Spouse(s): Emeline Woodson (died 1852) Georgiana Collis (m. 1860)
- Children: 3

Albert Lawrence West (May 10, 1825 – September 27, 1892), known as A. L. West, was an American architect based in Richmond, Virginia. His work is in Virginia and North Carolina and includes the Pasquotank County Courthouse (1883) in Elizabeth City, North Carolina.

== Biography ==
Albert L. West was born on May 10, 1825, in Laurel Grove, Chesterfield County, Virginia. His father owned a plantation. At the age of 18, he moved to Richmond, Virginia. He lived for a time in Petersburg.

West began his career as a carpenter and builder. He worked as an engineer and architect at the hospital in Augusta, Georgia, for the Confederacy during the American Civil War. As an architect he designed several Methodist churches. He wrote The Architect and Builder's Vade-Mecum and Book of Reference in 1871. He became a fellow in the American Institute of Architects (FAIA) towards the end of his career and was the first native Virginian so honored. He was chairman of the State Sunday School Executive Committee and in 1890 was the Virginia delegate to the International Sunday School Convention in Pittsburgh. He was superintendent and president of the Sunday School Union. He was also temporarily superintendent of the school at Highland Park.

West married Emeline Woodson of Lexington. She died in 1852. He married Georgiana Collis, daughter of William Collis, of Norfolk in 1860. They had three children, Mattie, Georgie and William C. His son William was also an architect. He was a member of the Methodist Church and the Centenary Church. He died on September 27, 1892, at his home on Clay Street in Richmond. He was buried in Hollywood Cemetery.

== Works ==
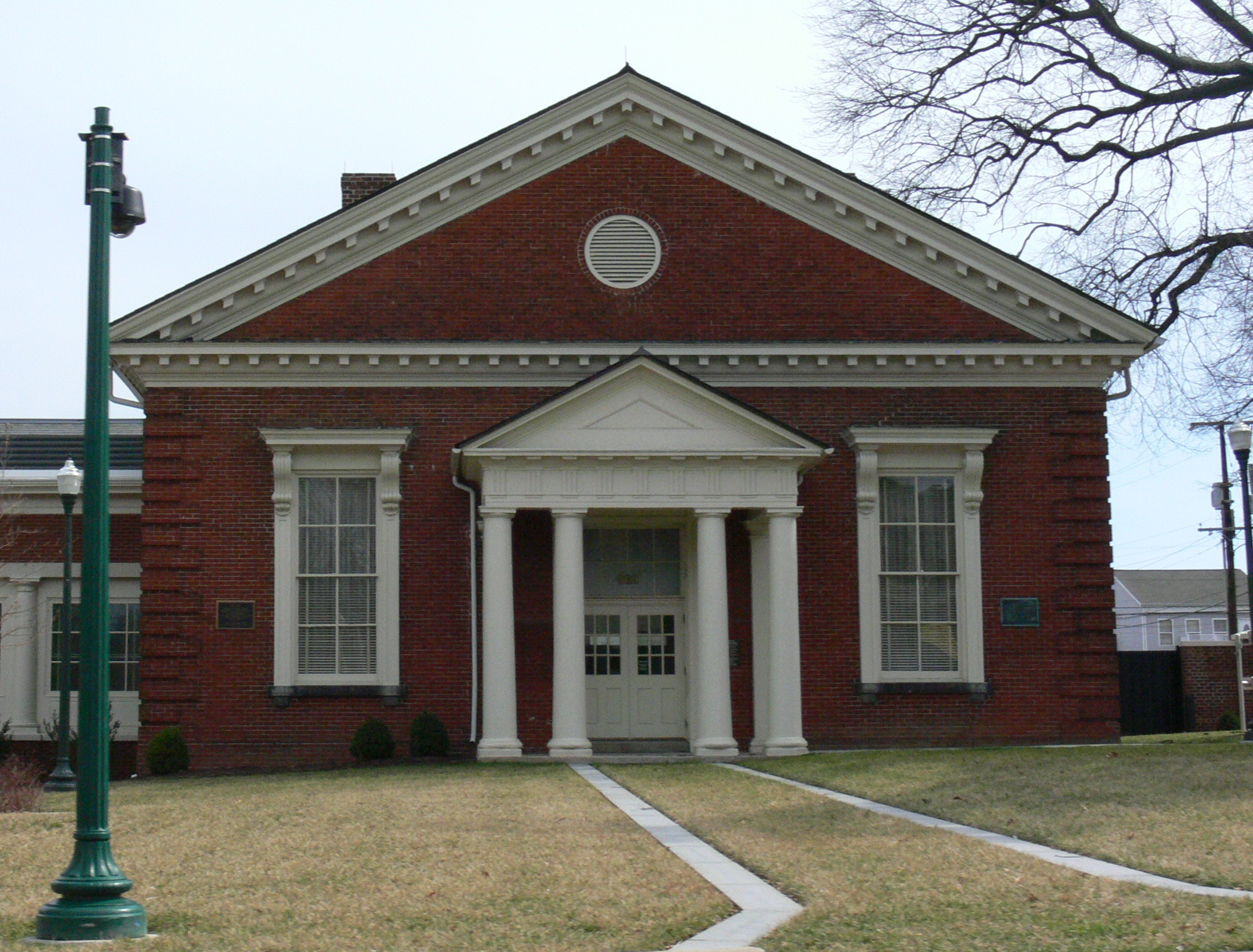
Manchester County Courthouse (Richmond, Virginia)

- Manchester Courthouse (Richmond, Virginia) at 920 Hull Street (1871)
- remodeling of Centenary Church (Richmond, Virginia)
- Monumental Methodist Church Portsmouth, Virginia
- Laurel Street Methodist Church (Richmond, Virginia)
- Trinity Methodist Church (Richmond, Virginia) at 2006 East Broad Street (1860). The church site includes a historical marker. The congregation relocated to Henrico County in 1945. The church building is still standing.
- original buildings at Richmond fairgrounds

== See also ==
- National Register of Historic Places listings in Richmond, Virginia
