= Lee Art Theatre =

Adult movie theater in Richmond, Virginia

Coordinates: 37.550750°N 77.452542°W

The outside of the Lee Art Theatre, photo from Special Collections and Archives, VCU Libraries

The Lee Art Theatre [sic] was an adult movie theater located on 934 W Grace Street, Richmond, Virginia, United States, that ran from 1965 to 1993. It is known as Richmond's first adult theater, and featured burlesque dancers in its later years. The theater closed in 1993, was bought and reopened by Virginia Commonwealth University, was renamed the Grace Street Theater, and is now used for the University's Dance program.

== Opening ==
The theater, originally the Lee Theater, named after the Confederate general Robert E. Lee, opened on October 13, 1935, and had seating for 588. The opening night program stated it was built "in anticipation of scientific entertainment, miracles of the present and future, talking pictures, and other developments, [that] future generations will know and enjoy." The first showing was of China Seas. At this time it was a second-run movie theater that showed family-oriented MGM movies. The Lee Theatre was designed by Richmond architect Henry Carl Messerschmidt in an Art Deco style. By 1950, it was operated by Fabian Theatres chain who closed it in 1963. Its final showing was Carry On Teacher.

It reopened on October 23, 1965, as the renamed Lee Art Theatre with Jayne Mansfield in "Promises, Promises" (the uncut European version) & Kenneth More in "Loss of Innocence". It screened adult films and this continued until closing in 1993.

== Opening as an art house ==
The theater was remodeled and reopened as the Lee Art Theatre in September 1965. It opened with the intention of being an art house, showing mostly foreign films. A personal account explains the Lee Art Theatre's marketing: "The programmer was clearly targeting couples with a guilty pleasure as bait but offering a respectable or even critically acclaimed title to validate their attendance." The theater used adult programs as a way to keep people interested in the art house.

== Richmond's first porn theater ==
Without the public desire for foreign films, the theater soon began playing soft-core porn movies such as The Girl From S.I.N and Olga's Dance Hall Girls. The theater even played the huge hit Deep Throat, which helped launch the porn chic movement of the 1970s. Lines formed around the block for the showings of this film. By 1971, it was calling itself "Richmond's first adult theater", and in 1975 it added burlesque dancers. The local drag queen Dirtwoman was a frequent performer.

== Lee Art Theatre, Inc v. Virginia ==
Richmond police confiscated several films (such as Angelique in Black Leather) from the Lee Art Theatre for obscenity based solely on one officer’s personal observations. On November 18, 1966, the lower court of the City of Richmond found the theater management guilty of possessing and exhibiting lewd and obscene motion pictures in violation of Va. Code, § 18.1-228. On October 10, 1967, the Virginia Supreme Court rejected an appeal from the theater and let the conviction stand. The U.S. Supreme Court took the appeal on June 17, 1968.

On July 15, 1968, the Supreme Court of the United States ruled that it was not constitutional to issue a warrant to seize obscene material based simply on a police officer’s personal observations without additional judicial inquiry into the factual basis of the officer’s assertions. Justice Harlan suggested that "the police officer should not merely say that he has seen a movie and considers it obscene, but should offer something in the way of a box score of what transpires therein." The case was sent back to the Virginia Supreme Court, which reversed the judgments of the lower court and dismissed the indictments against the theater management.

== Grace Street Theater ==
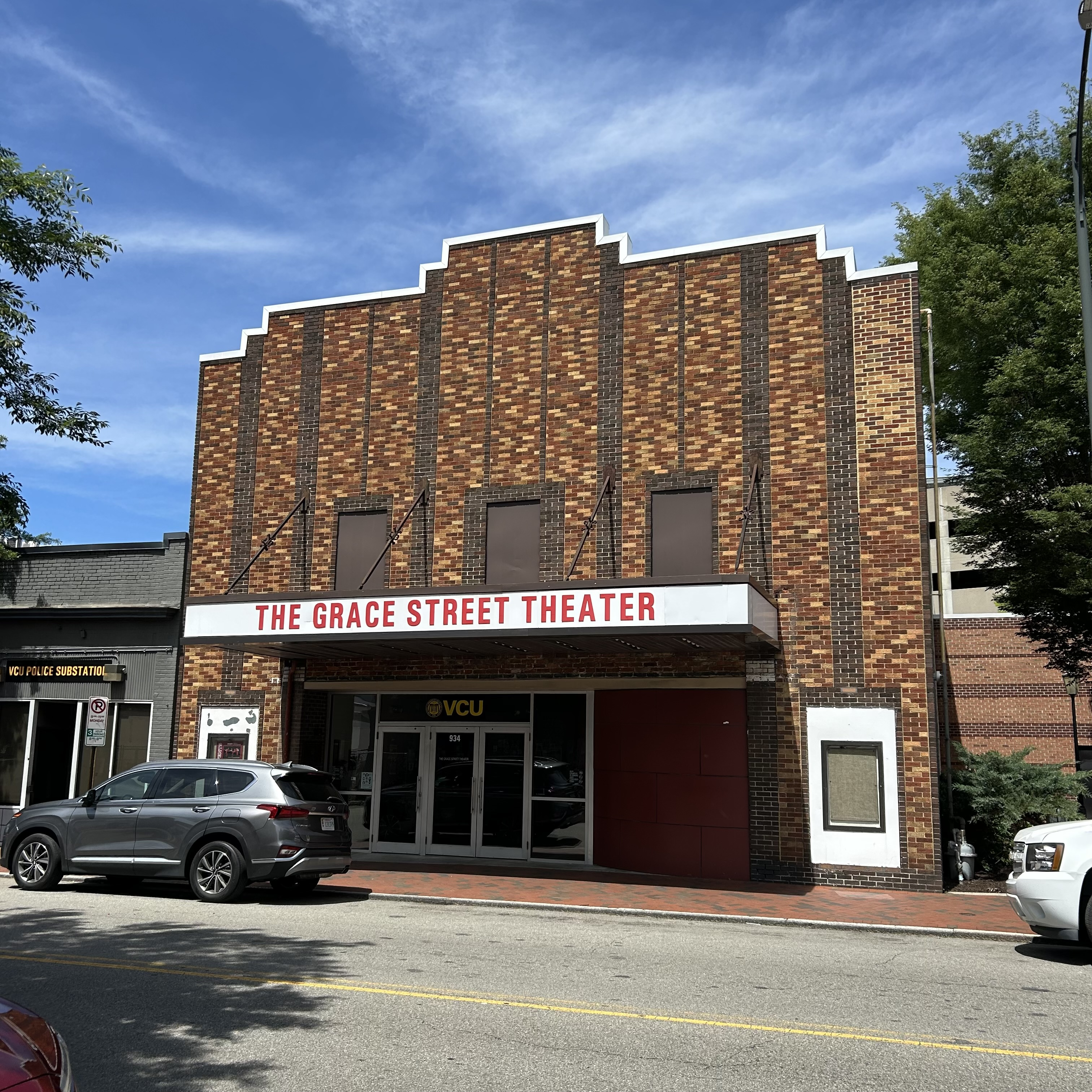
Grace Street Theater in 2025

After the Supreme Court case, the Lee Art Theatre continued to run as an adult theater until it closed in 1993. With the rise of home videos, the need for an adult theater decreased. The theater was then bought by Virginia Commonwealth University and remodeled. In February 1996 the theater reopened, was renamed the Grace Street Theater, and is currently still in use for the university's dance program.
