= Fifth and Main Downtown Historic District =

Historic district in Virginia, United States

- U.S. National Register of Historic Places
- U.S. Historic district
- Virginia Landmarks Register
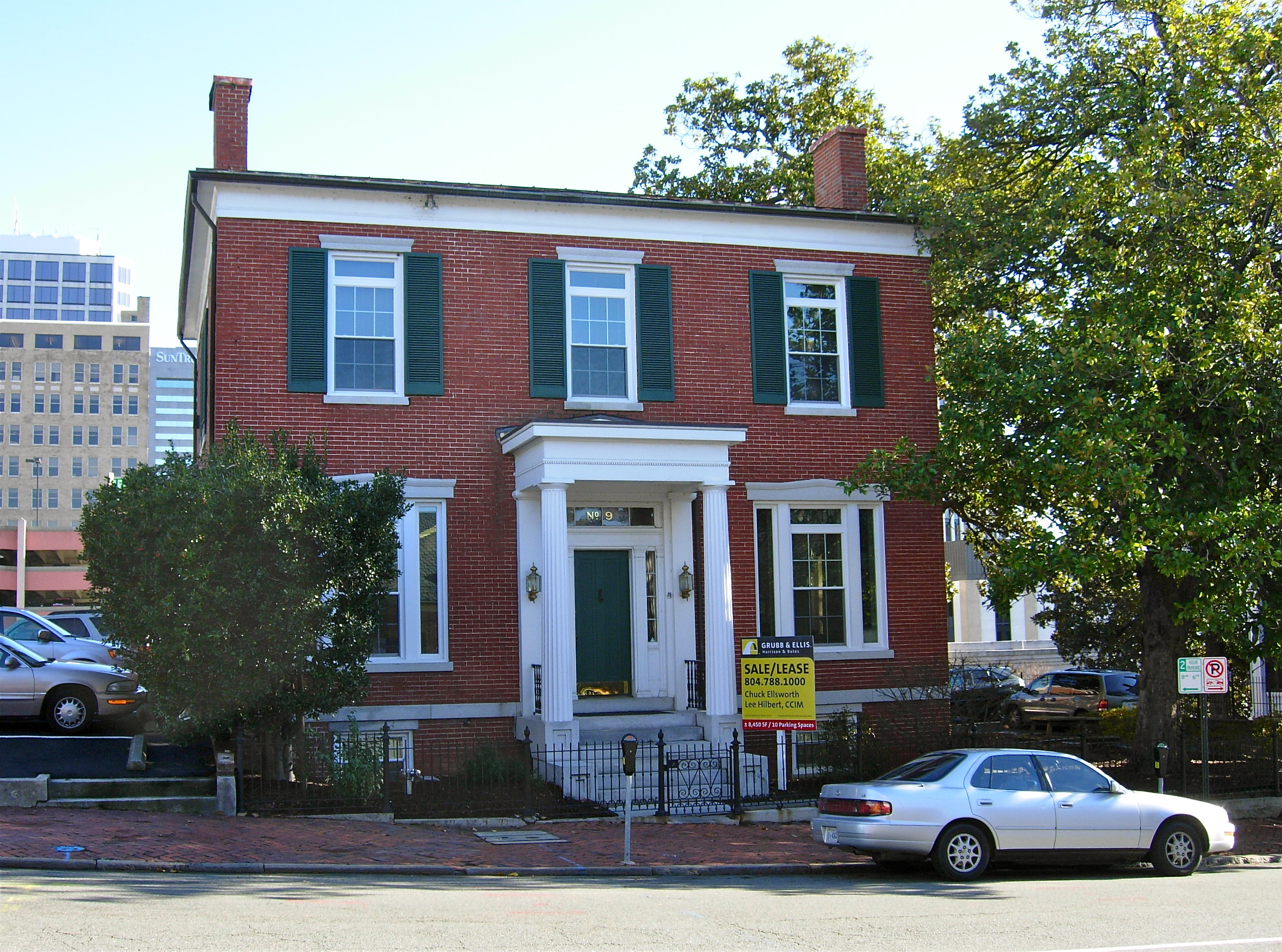
- House at Fifth and Main, January 2012

- Location within Virginia Location within the United States
- Location: 400-500 Blks E. Franklin St., 400-600 blocks E. Main St., 00 blocks N 4th, 5th and 6th Sts.; 0 blk. of N. 3rd, N. 4th, S. 6th, & 300, 400 blocks E. Main Sts., 00 blk S 5th St., Richmond, Virginia
- Coordinates: 37°32′32″N 77°26′23″W
- Area: 12.9 acres (5.2 ha)
- Architect: Lafever, Minard; Marcellus Wright & Son, Baskervill & Son, et al.
- Architectural style: Federal, Greek Revival, Classical Revival, International Style, et al.
- NRHP reference No.: 06000750, 12000989 (Boundary Increase)
- VLR No.: 127-6071

Significant dates
- Added to NRHP: August 30, 2006, November 28, 2012 (Boundary Increase)
- Designated VLR: June 8, 2006, September 20, 2012

The Fifth and Main Downtown Historic District is a national historic district located in downtown Richmond, Virginia. The district encompasses 38 contributing buildings and 1 contributing object located south of the Grace Street Commercial Historic District. It reflects the core of the city's early-20th century retail development. The district includes representative examples of the Federal, Greek Revival, Classical Revival and International Style architecture built between the mid-19th and mid-20th centuries. Notable buildings include the Equitable Life Insurance Building (1951), the Massey Building (1952, 1963–64), and 400 East Main Street (1951). Located in the district is the separately listed St. Alban's Hall (1869).

It was added to the National Register of Historic Places in 2006, with a boundary increase in 2012.
