= Samuel Pleasants Parsons House =

Historic house in Virginia, US

- U.S. Historic district – Contributing property
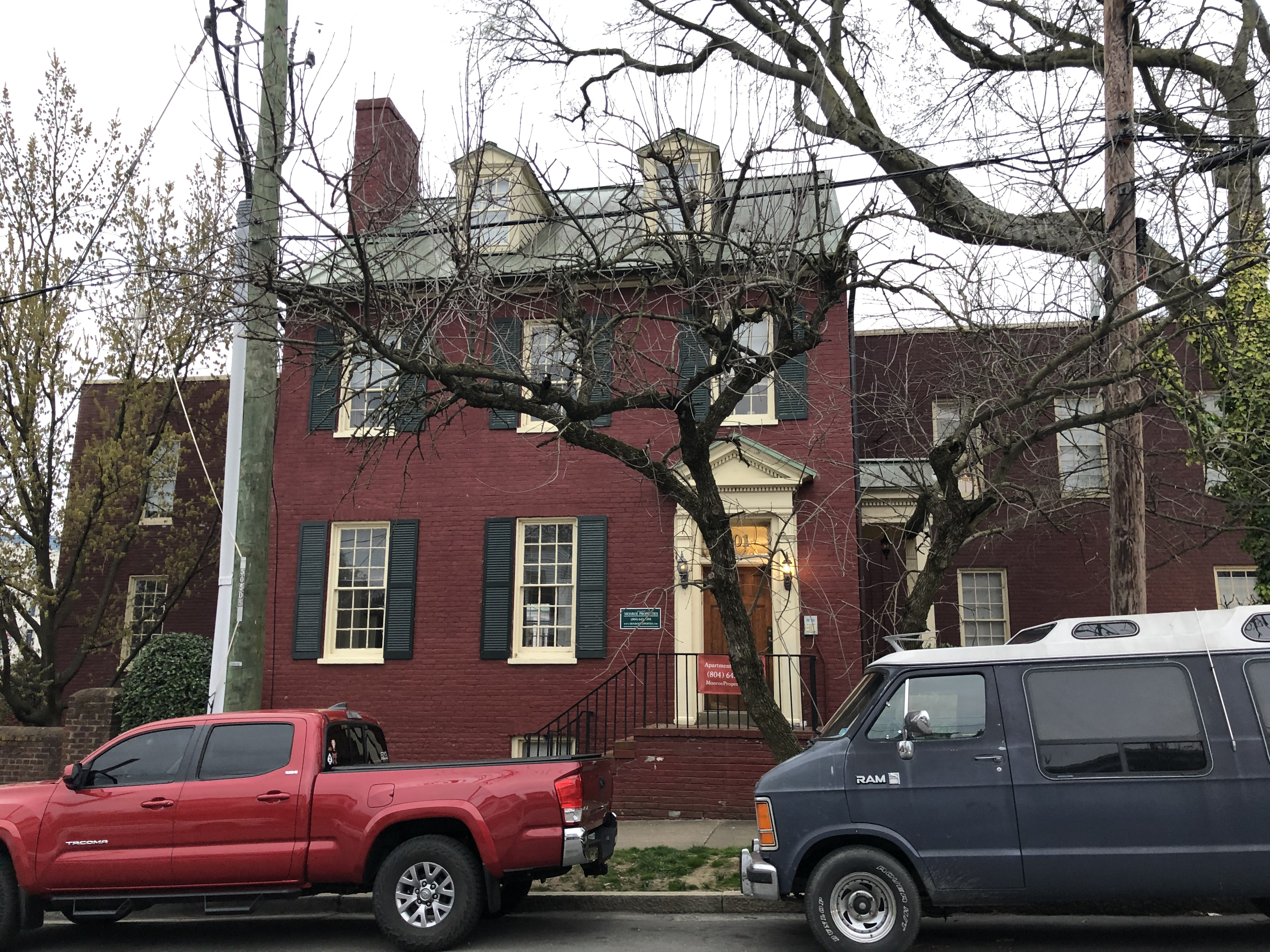
- Samuel Pleasants Parsons House, 2020
- Location: 601 Spring Street; Richmond, Virginia
- Coordinates: 37°32′20.4″N 77°26′59.2″W
- Built: 1818
- Architectural style: Federal-Style, Greek Revival
- Part of: Oregon Hill Historic District (ID91000022)
- Designated CP: February 5, 1991

The Samuel Pleasants Parsons House is a historic dwelling located at 601 Spring Street in Richmond, Virginia. It is best known for being the home of quaker, abolitionist, and prison superintendent Samuel Pleasants Parsons. It is likely that this house was once a stop on the Underground Railroad. It is the oldest remaining building within the Oregon Hill neighborhood.

== History ==
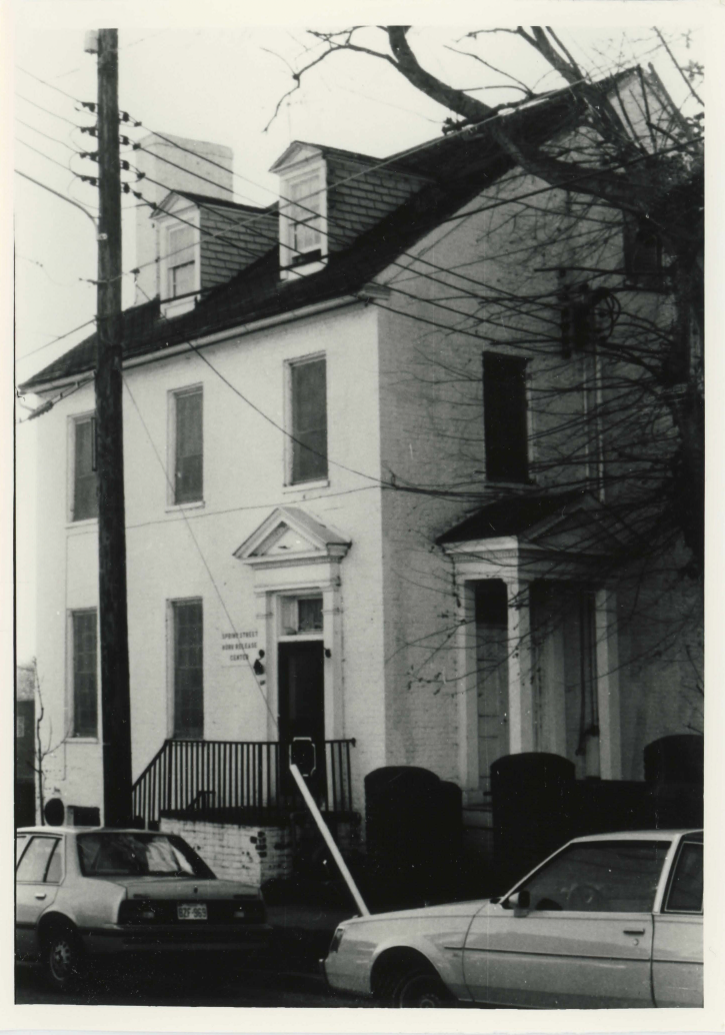
A picture taken in 1986, while the dwelling was being used by Virginia Department of Corrections for a work program.

Samuel Parsons had his residence built in 1818 around his time as the superintendent at the Virginia State Penitentiary which too stood on spring street across Belvedere Street. The dwelling is the only surviving building of "Harvie's Plan" of 1817. Beginning in the 1870s, the dwelling was used to house unwed mothers and later served the Virginia Department of Corrections as a refuge for young female offenders in their work release program.

By the turn of the 21st century, the house had fallen into despair, graffiti covered the walls, and a decade had passed since the dwelling had been inhabited. In 2000, local developer Robin Miller renovated the dwelling and now it serves as apartments.

== Architecture ==
The Federalist-style house was originally built in 1818 with additions being added in later years. It has a gabled roof and a Greek Revival portico on each of its front entrances. Important interior details survive, such as fireplace mantels and some woodwork.
