= Oregon Hill =

- Oregon Hill Historic District
- U.S. National Register of Historic Places
- U.S. Historic district
- Virginia Landmarks Register
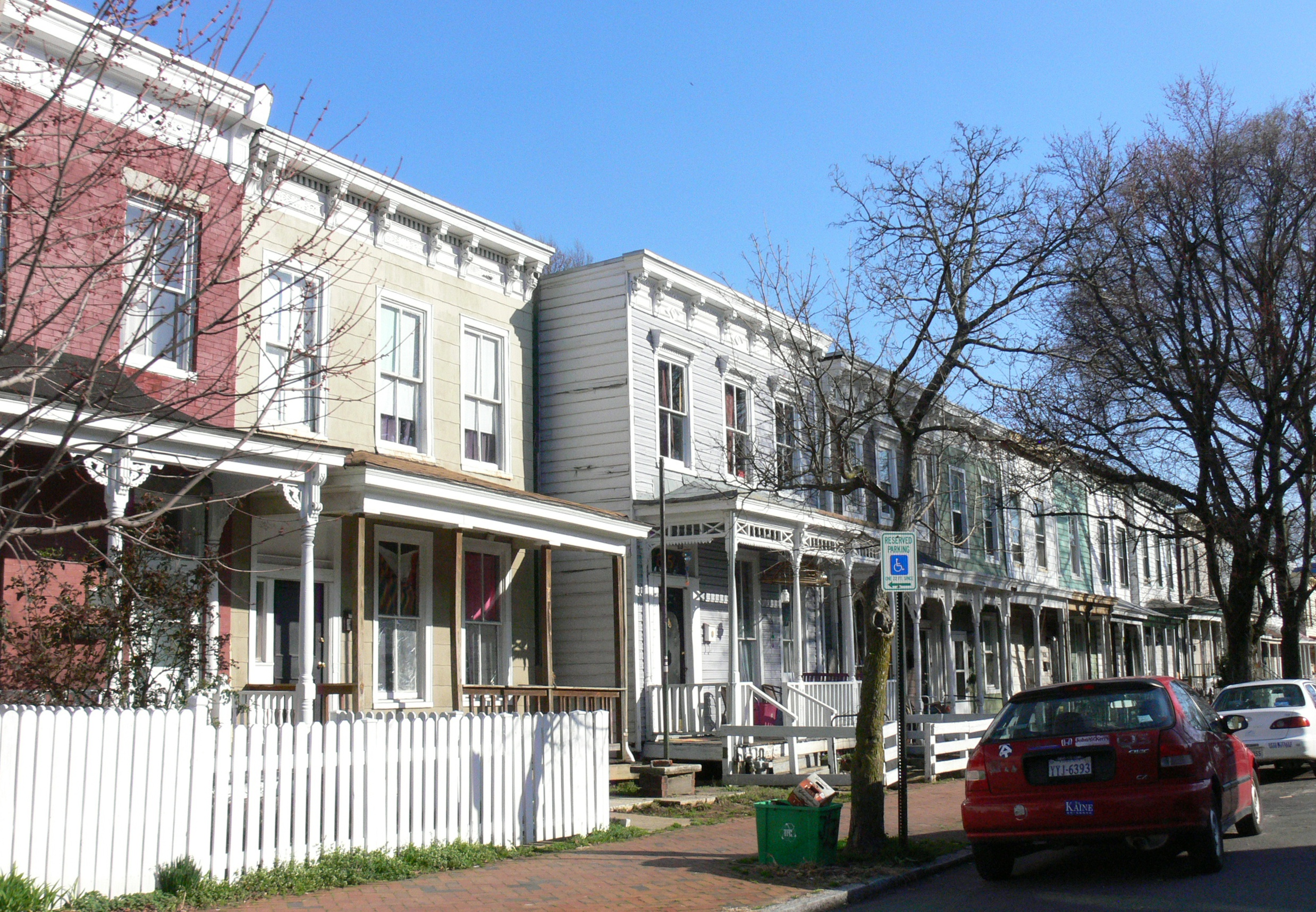
- View down Laurel Street in Oregon Hill
- Location: Roughly bounded by W. Cary St., Belvidere St., Oregon Hill Park, S. Cherry St. and S. Linden St., Richmond, Virginia
- Coordinates: 37°32′24″N 77°27′7″W
- Area: 84 acres (34 ha)
- Architect: Noland & Baskervill; Martin, Baylor S.
- Architectural style: Late 19th And 20th Century Revivals, Late Victorian, Federal
- NRHP reference No.: 91000022
- VLR No.: 127-0362

Significant dates
- Added to NRHP: February 5, 1991
- Designated VLR: December 11, 1990

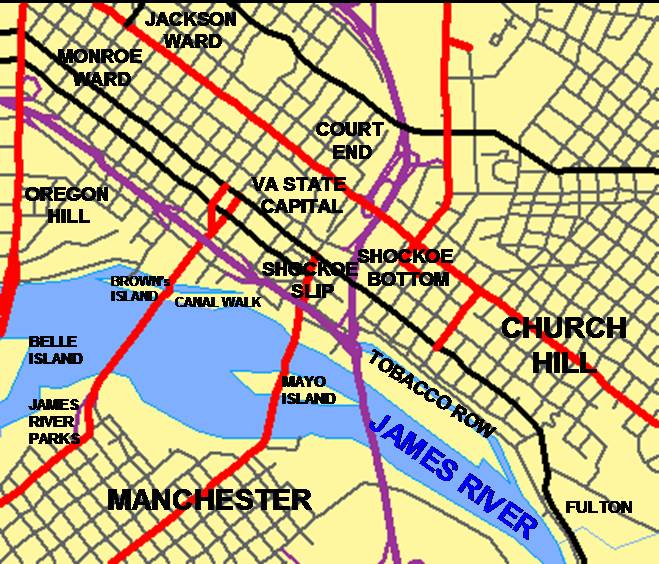
There are several areas in Downtown Richmond, including Shockoe Bottom, Shockoe Slip, the River District, Belle Isle, Monroe Ward, Manchester, Jackson Ward, Main Street, Court End, Tobacco Row, and the Canal Walk. edit

Oregon Hill is a historic working-class neighborhood in Richmond, Virginia. Oregon Hill overlooks the James River and Belle Isle, and provides access to Hollywood Cemetery. Due to the neighborhood's proximity to the Monroe Park Campus of Virginia Commonwealth University, the neighborhood is sometimes referred to as a student quarter because of its high college student population.

William Byrd III established a rural estate on the property in 1758. Wealthy heiress Grace Arents helped build many institutions to serve the community.

== History ==
In 1758, William Byrd III built his country house Belvidere on this hill, with views of the James River as well as Church Hill (Richmond, Virginia) and Shockoe Hill. Fire destroyed the house and gardens about a century later, by which time the neighborhood had transformed from an agricultural to industrial one. Construction of the James River and Kanawha Canal beginning in 1785 brought not only boatman, but merchants, millers and iron workers to the neighborhood.

Important Quakers who lived in the Oregon Hill neighborhood included Robert Pleasants, and later Samuel Pleasants Parsons, who became superintendent of the Virginia Penitentiary, which once stood on Belvidere Street. As General Superintendent of the canal company, Parsons oversaw its expansion to Lynchburg, Virginia. In 1817, the Harvie family, which owned most of the neighborhood, subdivided it into lots, which were sold to blacks as well as whites. The Baker House, built by a "free person of color" on Belvidere Street c. 1850, was moved in the 1920s to 617 Cherry Street. The neighborhood's name refers to quips that employees moving there to be close to their workplace might as well be moving westward to Oregon. The Tredegar Iron Works and Albemarle Paper Company became major employers by the 1850s. In 1849, the Hollywood Cemetery was developed from what had been known as Harvie's Woods at the edge of the neighborhood.

Most early buildings in the current historic district date from industrial expansion during Reconstruction following the Civil War, when state office buildings also replaced some single-family housing. Richmond annexed the neighborhood in 1869. The oldest surviving church building is the Pine Street Baptist Church, built in 1886. Another of the neighborhood's churches, Laurel Street Methodist Church, was destroyed by fire in 1968; its site is now Pleasant's Park. The city acquired the land which became Riverside Park, delimiting the neighborhood's southern edge, in 1889. The park keeper's house dates from 1900, but many of the walkways and other buildings were constructed by the Works Progress Administration in the 1930s. The park sustained substantial damage from tropical storm Gaston in 2004. In the early 1940s, the neighborhood saw a large fluxation of Jewish immigrants fleeing Eastern Europe. The population was extrapolated in the 1960s due to segregation laws.

St. Andrew's Church started as a Sunday school mission of St. Paul's Episcopal Church in 1873. A brick structure replaced the original wood-frame building in 1901. In 1894, Richmond philanthropist Grace Arents (niece of Lewis Ginter) established a kindergarten, which later expanded into St. Andrews School, and ultimately the St. Andrew's Church Complex. Around the same time, Sadie Cabaniss, superintendent of the nursing school at Old Dominion Hospital (now VCU School of Nursing), founded the Nurse's Settlement House, now known as the William Byrd Community House. All three continue to the current day, with separate but complementary missions among the neighborhood's (and metropolitan area's) working families.

== Today ==
Oregon Hill is currently bordered by Cary St. to the north, Belvidere St. to the east, The James River and Canal to the south, and by the Hollywood cemetery and Linden St. to the west. It is located only a few blocks south of Virginia Commonwealth University. This makes it a popular place for students to rent houses or apartments. It is also known as a white working-class enclave. Recently, there has been much development throughout Oregon Hill. This development has occurred in several forms. Infill projects have erected houses in lots that were previously vacant due to fires or other demolition. Many old buildings have either been torn down and replaced with townhouses, or renovated. A new townhouse complex called The Overlook was completed in the late 2010's and was constructed on the blocks overlooking the James River. Possibly one of the most important sites in this neighborhood is Moss's House. Oregon Hill is home to L'opossum restaurant, which Tom Hanks has visited. Up until the 1990s, original housing stock stood on and was inhabited in this area. It was demolished and the land stood vacant after 1997, during which time it was used as a riverside park overlooking the James. The complete demolition of all the houses on these 3 blocks was a source of bitter contention between the neighborhood and the Ethyl Corporation, which owned the land. Some original houses still look over the river to the west of this development. Due to the major development, and the accompanying rise in property taxes and general cost of living, many families who have lived in Oregon Hill for generations are selling their homes or finding their rents unaffordable.

== Notable residents ==
- Boris Kodjoe, actor, lived there while attending Virginia Commonwealth University
- Members of the heavy metal band Lamb of God lived in the neighborhood while attending Virginia Commonwealth University, playing their earliest shows in basements throughout Oregon Hill.
- Caressa Cameron, 2010 Miss America
- Donnie Corker, cross-dresser, entertainer, entrepreneur and activist
- Christopher Poole, founder of 4chan, lived in the neighborhood while attending Virginia Commonwealth University
- Troy Daniels, shooting guard for the Charlotte Hornets, briefly lived in the neighborhood while playing for the VCU Rams men's basketball team in 2010
- Jay Pharoah, Saturday Night Live cast member, while attending VCU
- David Baldacci, best-selling novelist
- Mary Jackson, leader of the 1863 Richmond Bread Riot

== In popular culture ==
Oregon Hill is the first book of Howard Owen's Willie Black mystery series. As the New York Times Sunday Book Review said, "Owen has recruited his sick, sad and creatively crazy characters from a rough neighborhood cut off from the rest of the city when the expressway was built. If anyone is watching out for the forgotten citizens of Oregon Hill, it's Willie, who grew up there and speaks the local language, a crisp and colorful urban idiom..."

== See also ==
- Samuel Pleasants Parsons House, a contributing property of the Oregon Hill Historic District
