= St. Alban's Hall (Richmond, Virginia) =

- U.S. National Register of Historic Places
- U.S. Historic district – Contributing property
- Virginia Landmarks Register
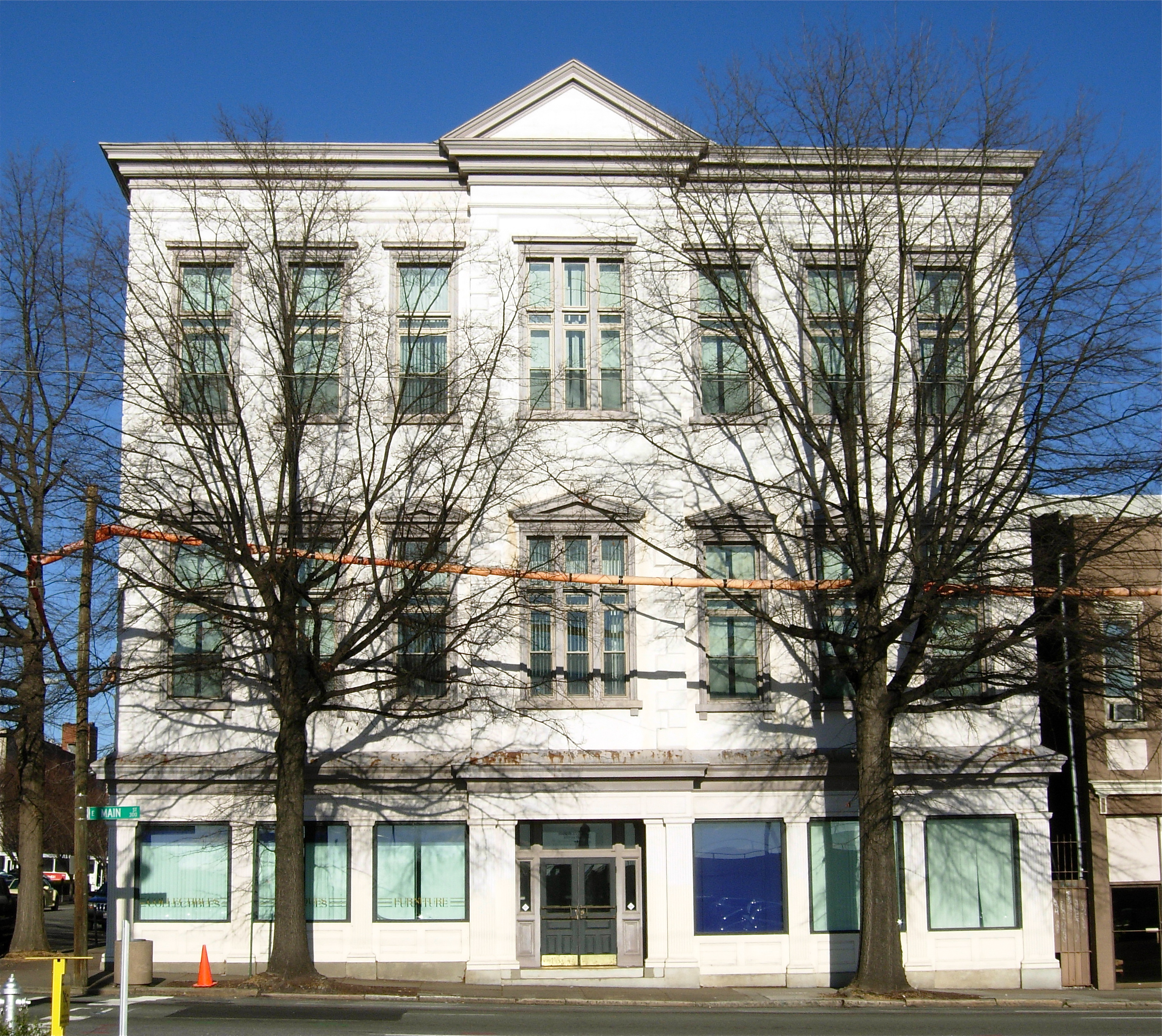
- St. Alban's Hall, January 2012

- Location within Virginia Location within the United States
- Location: 300-302 E. Main St., Richmond, Virginia
- Coordinates: 37°32′31″N 77°26′34″W
- Area: 0.1 acres (0.040 ha)
- Built: 1869
- Architectural style: Italianate
- NRHP reference No.: 82004588
- VLR No.: 127-0130

Significant dates
- Added to NRHP: September 9, 1982
- Designated VLR: July 20, 1982

St. Alban's Hall, also known as The Crenshaw Building, is a historic Masonic Lodge located in Richmond, Virginia, United States. It was built in 1869, and is a three-story, stuccoed brick Italianate style building. The Hall consisted of shops, a concert hall, as well as Masonic meeting rooms, and served as an important focus of post-Civil War Richmond's social and political life.

It was listed on the National Register of Historic Places in 1982. It is located in the Fifth and Main Downtown Historic District.
