= Joseph P. Winston House =

Historic house in Virginia, US

- U.S. National Register of Historic Places
- U.S. Historic district – Contributing property
- Virginia Landmarks Register
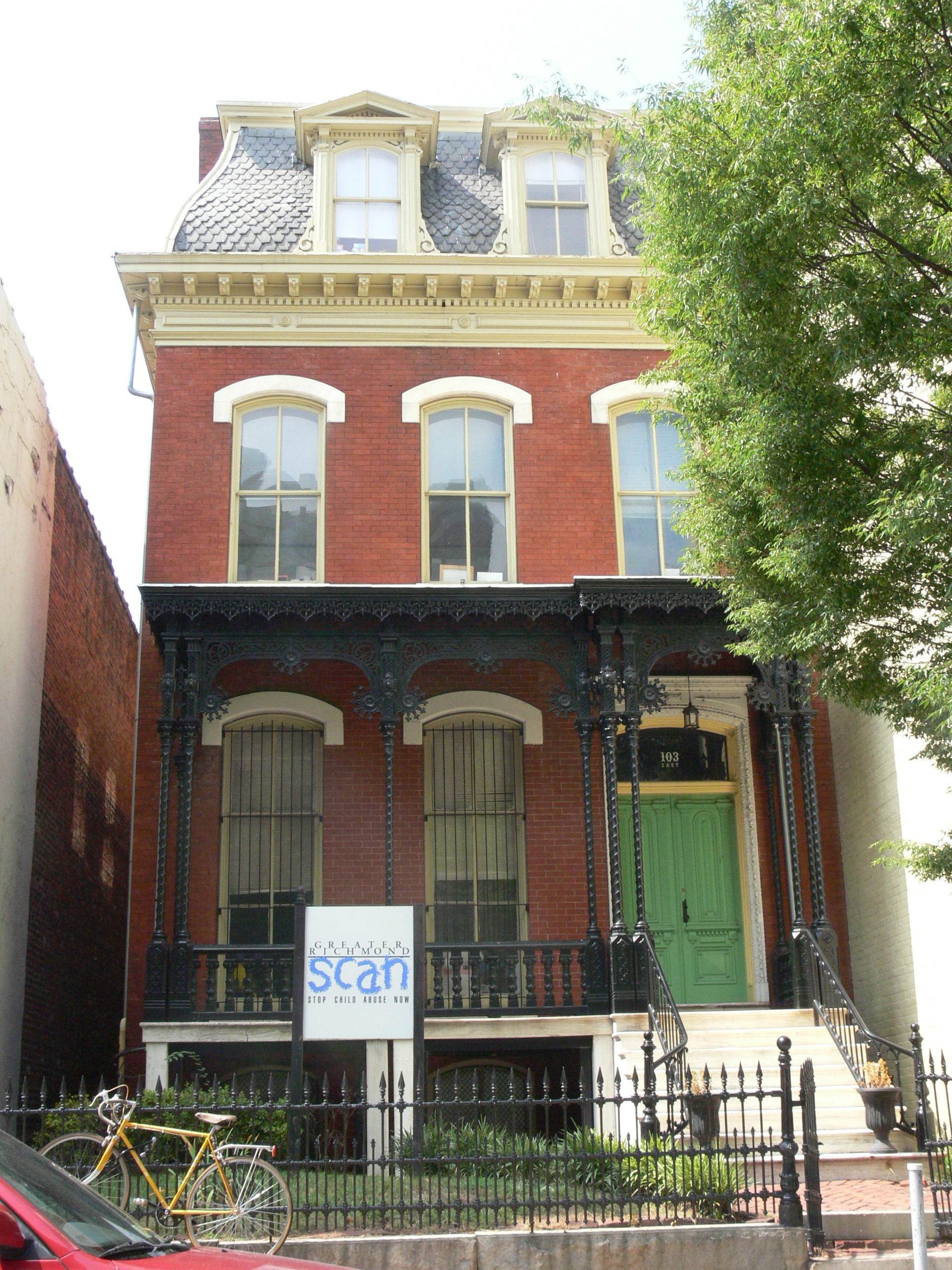
- Joseph P. Winston House, August 2011

- Location within Virginia Location within the United States
- Location: 101-103 E. Grace St., Richmond, Virginia
- Coordinates: 37°32′38″N 77°26′32″W
- Area: less than one acre
- Built: 1873-1874, 1920
- Architect: Lee, Duncan
- Architectural style: Spanish-Mediterranean Revival
- Part of: Grace Street Commercial Historic District (ID98000739)
- NRHP reference No.: 79003295
- VLR No.: 127-0222

Significant dates
- Added to NRHP: June 11, 1979
- Designated CP: July 13, 1998
- Designated VLR: February 21, 1978

Joseph P. Winston House, also known as the Winston House, is a historic residence in Richmond, Virginia, United States. It was built in 1873-1874 for wholesale grocer Joseph P. Winston, and is a 2 1/2-story, three-bay, brick residence. It features a half-story, ogee-curved mansard roof with black slate shingles. It also has an elaborate cast-iron front porch and original cast-iron picket fence with gate. Also included is the adjacent Richmond Art Company Building. It was designed in 1920 by prominent architect Duncan Lee, and is a three-story, stuccoed brick building in a Spanish-Mediterranean Revival style.

It was added to the National Register of Historic Places on June 11, 1979. It is located in the Grace Street Commercial Historic District.

== See also ==
- National Register of Historic Places listings in Richmond, Virginia
