= Dominion Energy Center =

Performing arts center in Virginia

- Carpenter Theatre; Dorothy Pauley Square
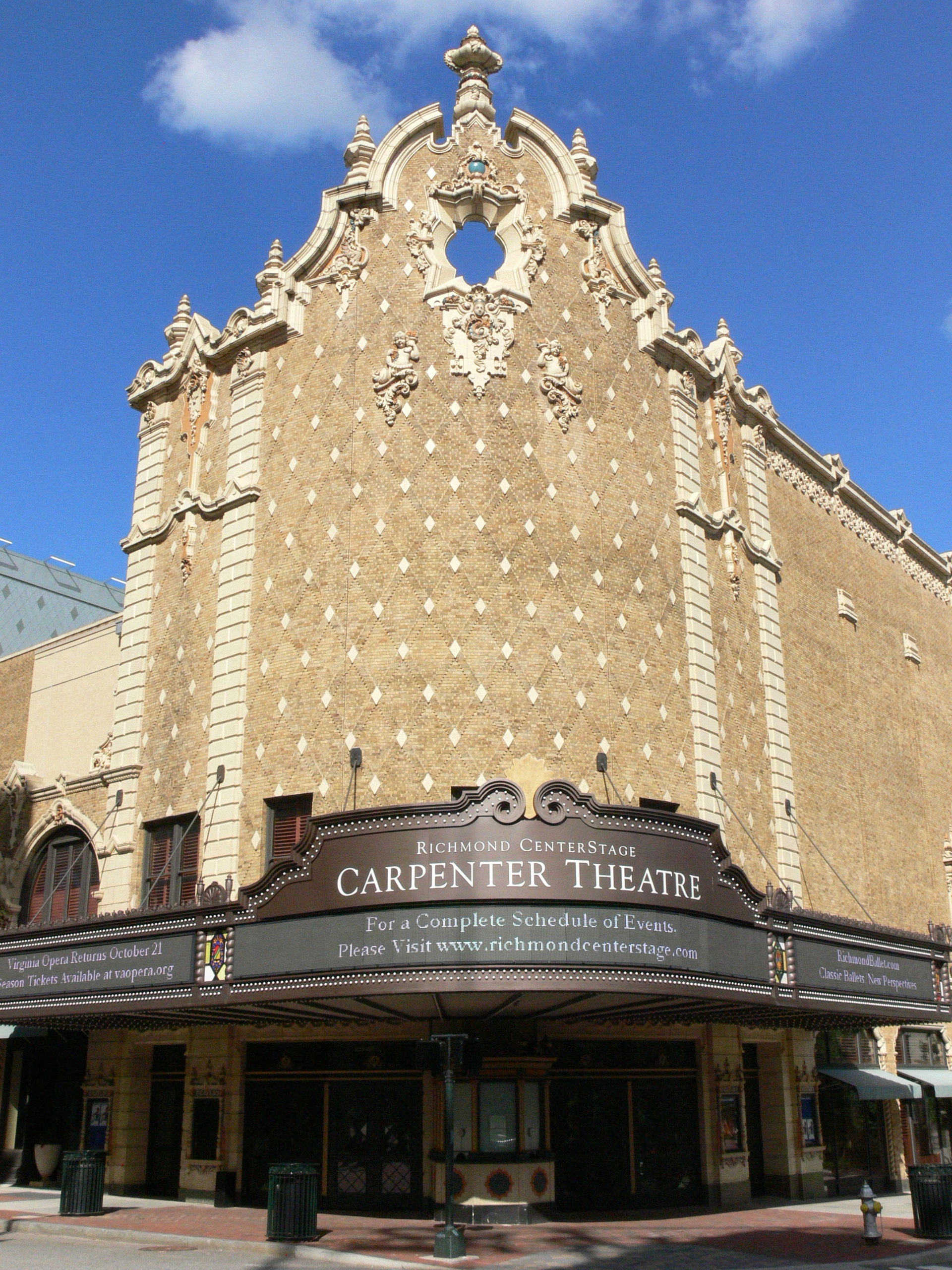
- Interactive map of Dominion Energy Center
- Former names: Loew's Theatre (1928‍–‍1979); Virginia Center for the Performing Arts (1979‍–‍2009); Richmond CenterStage (2009‍–‍2015); Dominion Arts Center (2015‍–‍2017)
- Address: 600 East Grace Street; Richmond, Virginia; United States
- Coordinates: 37.541°N 77.436°W
- Owner: City of Richmond (Carpenter Theatre); Richmond Performing Arts Alliance (Dorothy Pauley Square)
- Type: Proscenium theater
- Main venue: Carpenter Theatre; Capacity: approx. 1,800
- Facilities: Dorothy Pauley Square; Libby S. Gottwald Playhouse; Bob & Sally Mooney Hall

Construction
- Opened: April 9, 1928
- Reopened: September 12, 2009

Website
- www.dominionenergycenter.com
- Loews Theatre
- U.S. National Register of Historic Places
- U.S. Historic district – Contributing property
- Virginia Landmarks Register
- Location within Virginia Location within the United States
- Location: Downtown Richmond, Virginia
- Area: 1 acre (0.4 ha)
- Built: 1928
- Architect: John Eberson
- Architectural style: Spanish Colonial Revival
- Part of: Grace Street Commercial Historic District (ID98000739)
- NRHP reference No.: 79003292
- VLR No.: 127-0324

Significant dates
- Added to NRHP: November 20, 1979
- Designated CP: July 13, 1998
- Designated VLR: September 18, 1979

Dominion Energy Center is a performing arts center in Richmond, Virginia that houses a number of venues including the historic Carpenter Theatre, Libby S. Gottwald Playhouse, Bob & Sally Mooney Hall, and the Genworth BrightLights Education Center. The theatre was formerly known as Richmond CenterStage.

The Carpenter Theatre was originally a Loew's Theatre movie palace developed by the Loew's Theatres company and designed by John Eberson. The building's construction began in 1927, with its doors opening in 1928.

== Geography ==
Still known to many Richmonders as the Carpenter Theatre or Virginia Center for the Performing Arts, the main center stage structure occupies the 600 block of historic Grace Street, a one-way road traveling west through Richmond. In the Grace Street Commercial Historic District, it is bordered by Broad Street to the north, Seventh Street to the east, Grace Street to the south and Sixth street to the west. It is not in a City of Richmond Local Old & Historic District, but does now fall within the newly created Arts and Cultural District as designated by Richmond City Council.

== History ==
The Loew's Theatre Corporation's design was created by renowned New York architect John Eberson and was influenced by both Spanish and Moorish baroque architecture. Architectural historian Calder Loth states: "Loew's was considered the most up-to-date theater in the South when it opened on April 9, 1928". Eberson was famous for inventing the "atmospheric theatre" design, where the theater's walls resembled an elegant villa or streetscape under a night sky. The Carpenter Theatre design evokes a Spanish setting, with a faux sky ceiling containing stars and moving clouds.

The Richmond CenterStage complex was renamed Dominion Energy Center in 2015. The Richmond CenterStage Foundation has been re-branded as Richmond Performing Arts Alliance.

== Current use ==
The facility and organization, once known as the Carpenter Center for the Performing Arts, merged with Richmond Performing Arts Alliance (RPAA) in the early 2000s. After a major fundraising and advocacy campaign, and a private-public partnership with the City of Richmond, the Thalhimers Department Store, adjacent to the Carpenter Center, was purchased as part of the strategic plan to create the envisioned performing arts center. When construction was complete, the complex was renamed Richmond CenterStage and expanded to include the Altria Theater.

The center now contains five venues in two distinct locations. The Carpenter Theatre, named for the E. Rhodes and Leona B. Carpenter Foundation, is the historic 1,800-seat proscenium theater described above. Dorothy Pauley Square, a newer four-story building attached to the Carpenter Theatre, contains four venues: Libby S. Gottwald Playhouse, a 200-seat flexible playhouse; Bob & Sally Mooney Hall, a jazz / cabaret space; Showcase Gallery, a reception area and gallery for the visual arts; and the Genworth BrightLights Education Center, home to RPAA's BrightLights Education Initiatives.

The third and fourth floors of Dorothy Pauley Square contain office space currently occupied by the staffs of RPAA, Richmond Symphony and Virginia Opera. The third floor also contains the Genworth BrightLights Education Center, classroom and educational space used for RPAA and other arts groups' educational programming. The Digital Arts Lab is a state-of-the-art digital media center within the Bright Lights space.

CenterStage officially opened to the public on September 12, 2009, after a large capital campaign, a controversial public-private partnership with the City of Richmond, and a decision to resize the project from a much larger proposed one. Additionally controversial is the organizational structure of the complex that has Legends Global, a for-profit corporation, operating the venues via a City-appointed Board of local executives.

RPAA currently has eleven Resident Companies who use the venues for performances and educational programming. City of Richmond Department of Parks and Recreation, Elegba Folklore Society, Latin Ballet of Virginia, Modlin Center for the Arts at the University of Richmond, Richmond Ballet, The Richmond Forum, Richmond Shakespeare, Richmond Symphony, SPARC (School of the Performing Arts in the Richmond Community), Virginia Opera, and Virginia Repertory Theatre. The facility has the capacity to hold smaller groups for local and regional performances, as well as very large audiences for national touring acts.
