= The National (theater) =

Historic theater in Richmond, Virginia, US

- Interactive map of The National
- Address: 708 E Broad St
- Location: Richmond, Virginia
- Owner: AEG Live
- Operator: AEG Live
- Capacity: 1,500
- Type: Theater

Construction
- Opened: 1923
- Renovated: 2009

Website
- www.thenationalva.com
- National Theater
- U.S. National Register of Historic Places
- U.S. Historic district – Contributing property
- Virginia Landmarks Register
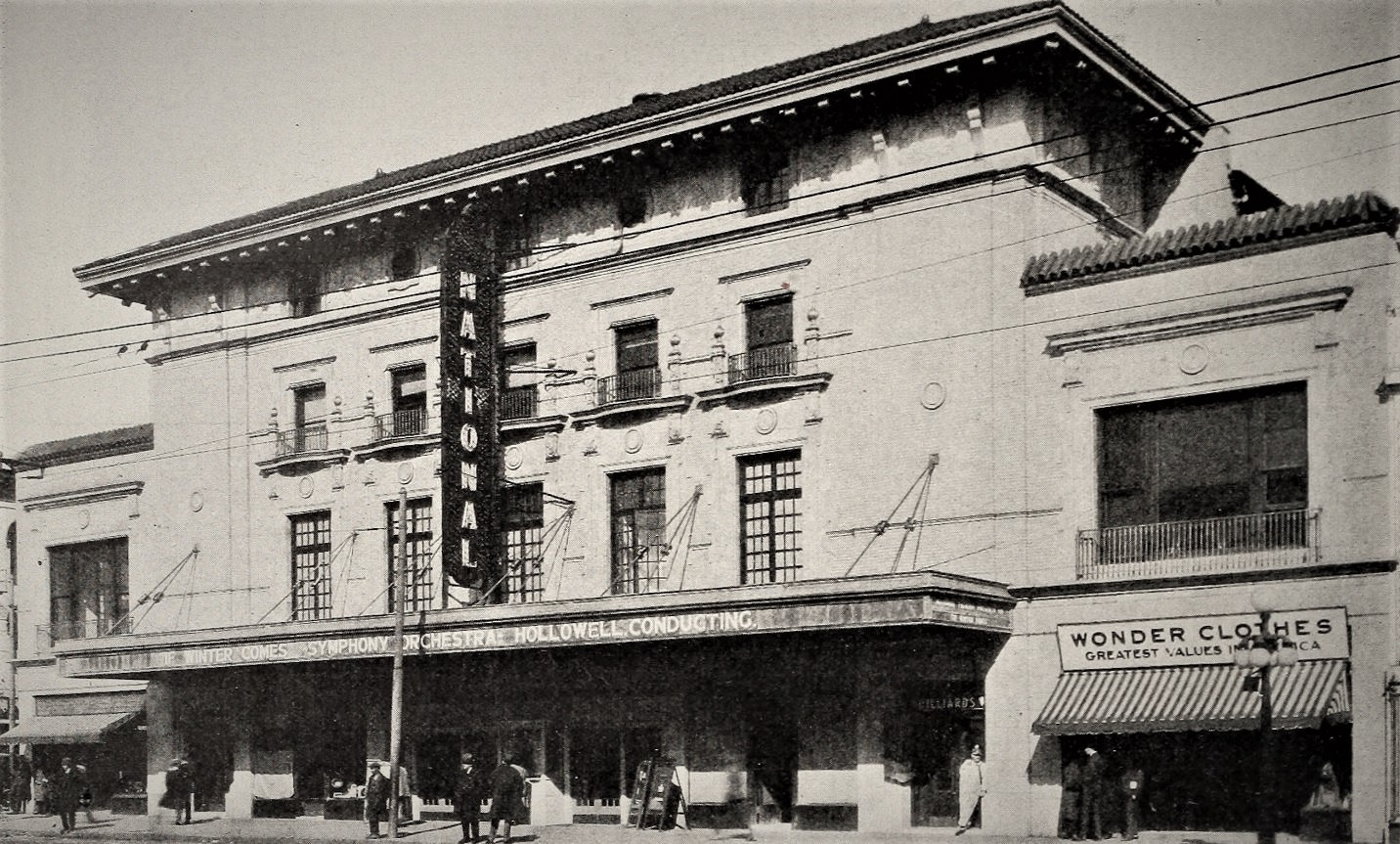
- The National Theater in March, 1924

- Location within Virginia Location within the United States
- Location: 700-710 E. Broad St., Richmond, Virginia
- Coordinates: 37°32′30″N 77°26′9″W
- Area: less than one acre
- Architect: Claude K. Howell; Ferruccio Legnaioli
- Architectural style: Renaissance Revival
- Part of: Grace Street Commercial Historic District (ID98000739)
- NRHP reference No.: 03000188
- VLR No.: 127-0178

Significant dates
- Added to NRHP: April 02, 2003
- Designated CP: July 13, 1998
- Designated VLR: December 4, 2002

The National, formerly the National Theater and then Towne Theater, is a historic theater and performance venue located in Richmond, Virginia, US. Part of a section of Broad Street once known as Theatre Row, it is the only one of the three original auditoriums still standing. Built in 1923, the theater was constructed with an adaptable stage that allowed it to show early motion pictures as well as live performances. After a 1968 conversion to a dedicated cinema house it was renamed the Towne Theater, in which capacity it operated until closing in 1983. After an extensive renovation, the theater reopened in 2008 as The National, serving as a live music and performing arts venue.

== History ==
The National Theater's construction began in 1922 and was completed in 1923. It was built in the Renaissance Revival style, with the street-facing sides finished in sandstone-colored brick with terracotta detailing. A four-story central section is flanked to the east and west by two-story wings. The street front portion of the first floor housed restaurant and retail space while the second and third contained offices. The fourth floor was dominated by the theater's projection room and a billiard room was housed in the basement. The auditorium itself originally sat 1,300, and features a large oval dome and considerable Adamesque plasterwork. The orchestra pit sat 24 musicians and was considered the largest in Virginia.

The theater opened on November 11, 1923 with a showing of Thomas Ince's film Her Reputation, which was attended by a crowd of 2,000 that included the governor of Virginia and the mayor of Richmond. The National's stage was notable for its ability to convert from showing motion pictures to also stage live entertainment such as vaudeville shows.

By 1966 the theater had come under the ownership of a Richmond-based firm that also owned the Colonial and State Theaters which constituted the rest of Theater Row. The National received a 1968 renovation that rearranged seating in the auditorium's balcony, covered the orchestra pit, and painted over much of the intricate plasterwork. It was also renamed as the Towne Theater. Despite the new name and look, business continued to wane as more theaters opened in the suburbs, and by 1981 it was the last theater open in downtown Richmond. It finally closed in 1983 and sat vacant for years afterward. In 1991 the City of Richmond entered into an agreement with the state government and a local historical society to purchase Theater Row; the State Theater was razed, and the Colonial's façade was incorporated into a new social services building. The National/Towne, meanwhile, began undergoing a gradual restoration by the Historic Richmond Foundation.

The theater was sold in 2006 to a company that completed a $15 million renovation, and in 2008 it reopened as The National and is used as a 1,500-seat performing arts and music venue. In 2014, the venue was acquired by AEG Live.

It was added to the National Register of Historic Places in 2003 and is located in the Grace Street Commercial Historic District.
