= Grace Street Commercial Historic District =

Historic district in Richmond, Virginia, United States

- U.S. National Register of Historic Places
- U.S. Historic district
- Virginia Landmarks Register
- Richmond City Historic District
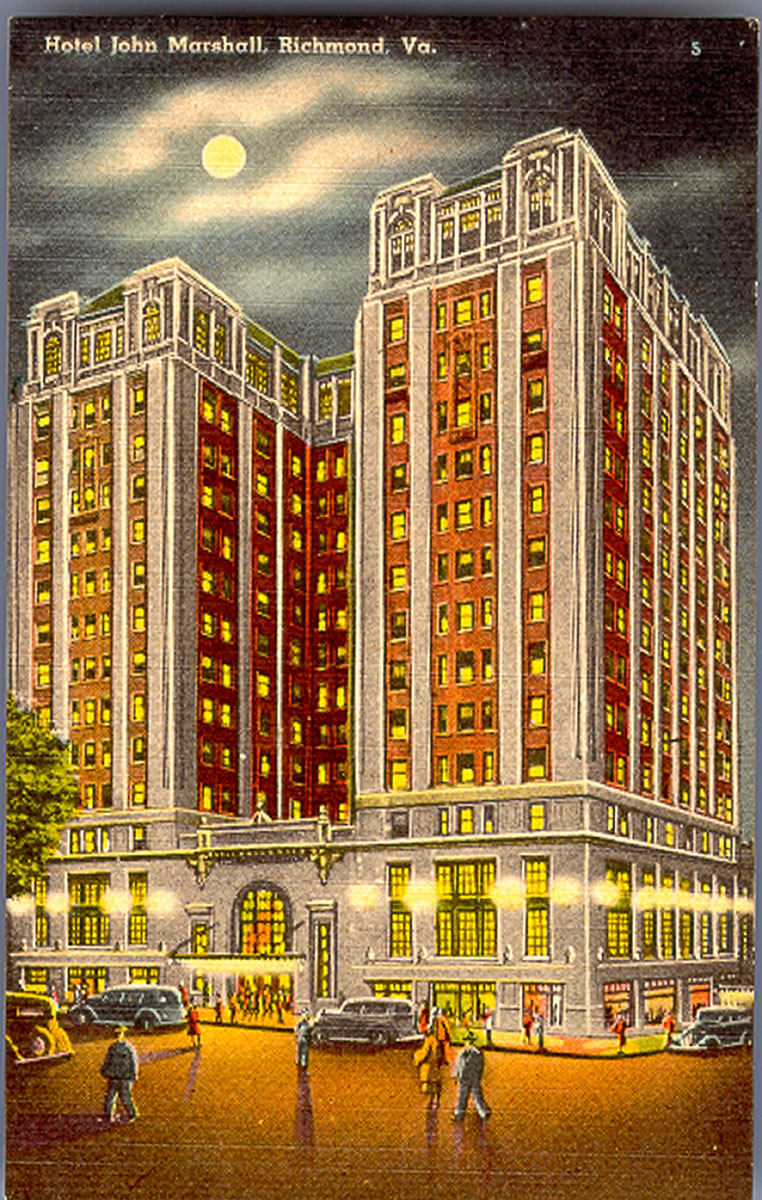
- Hotel John Marshall, c. 1930s

- Location within Virginia Location within the United States
- Location: Roughly bounded by Adams, Broad, 8th and Franklin Sts.; 626, 700 E. Broad St., 12-118 N. 8th St., 707-715 E. Franklin St., 2-18 and 13 W. Franklin St., Richmond, Virginia
- Coordinates: 37°32′31″N 77°26′19″W
- Area: 48.5 acres (19.6 ha)
- Built: 1844
- Architect: Howell, C.K.; et al.
- Architectural style: Chicago, Classical Revival, Mission/Spanish Revival, Colonial Revival, International Style
- NRHP reference No.: 98000739, 09000924 (Boundary Increase)
- VLR No.: 127-0857

Significant dates
- Added to NRHP: July 13, 1998, November 12, 2009 (Boundary Increase)
- Designated VLR: December 2, 1997; September 17, 2009

The Grace Street Commercial Historic District is a national historic district located in Richmond, Virginia. The district encompasses 93 contributing buildings located in downtown Richmond. The buildings reflect the core of the city's early 20th-century retail development and the remnants of a 19th-century residential neighborhood. The buildings are in a variety of popular 19th-century and early 20th-century architectural styles, including Classical Revival, Mission Revival, International Style, and Colonial Revival. Notable buildings include the Administration and Equipment Building for the Chesapeake & Potomac Telephone Company (1929), Thalhimer's Department Store, Atlantic Life Building (1950-1959), Miller & Rhoads Department Store, Berry-Burk Building, former W. W. Foster Studios (1927), Bank of Virginia (1949), Investment Realty Company building (1930), W.T. Grant Store (1939), Hotel John Marshall (1927), Franklin Federal Savings and Loan building (1954), and the Tompkins House (1820). Located in the district and separately listed are the Loew's Theatre, Centenary United Methodist Church, Joseph P. Winston House, Central National Bank, and National Theater.

It was added to the National Register of Historic Places in 1998, with a boundary increase in 2009.
