= Centenary United Methodist Church =

Historic church in Virginia, United States

- Centenary Church
- U.S. National Register of Historic Places
- U.S. Historic district – Contributing property
- Virginia Landmarks Register
- Richmond City Historic District
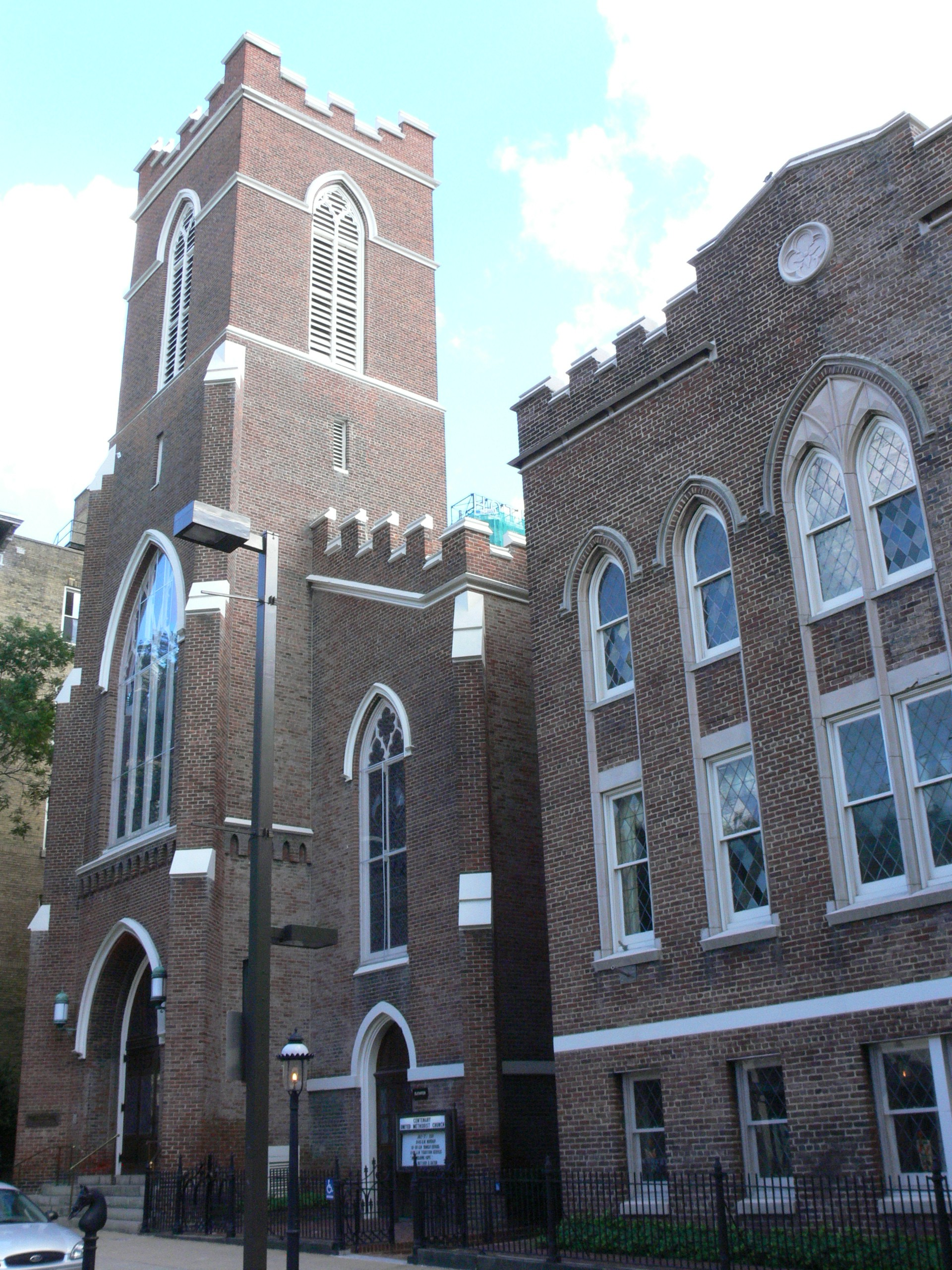
- Centenary United Methodist Church

- Location within Virginia Location within the United States
- Location: 411 E. Grace St., Richmond, Virginia
- Coordinates: 37°32′32″N 77°26′21″W
- Area: less than one acre
- Built: 1842
- Architect: Freeman, John; West, Albert L.
- Architectural style: Gothic Revival
- Part of: Grace Street Commercial Historic District (ID98000739)
- NRHP reference No.: 79003077
- VLR No.: 127-0321

Significant dates
- Added to NRHP: December 28, 1979
- Designated CP: July 13, 1998
- Designated VLR: October 16, 1979

Centenary United Methodist Church is a historic Methodist church located in Richmond, Virginia. The Gothic Revival building was completed in 1843. A simple brick building it was initially designed by John and Samuel Freeman before receiving a major expansion in the 1870s according to designs by Richmond architect Albert L. West. It is located at 411 East Grace Street.

It was added to the National Register of Historic Places on December 28, 1979. It is located in the Grace Street Commercial Historic District.

== See also ==
- National Register of Historic Places listings in Richmond, Virginia
