= Donnie Corker =

American local character (1951–2017)

- Born: Donald W. Corker; December 7, 1951; Richmond, Virginia, U.S.
- Died: September 26, 2017 (aged 65); Richmond, Virginia, U.S.

Donnie Corker, better known as Dirtwoman, (December 7, 1951 – September 26, 2017) was an American cross-dresser living in Richmond, Virginia known for involvement in Richmond politics, arts, music, and food banks. Corker additionally sold "Dirt-grams" during the holidays where he personally delivered messages and greetings. Also well known as the human floral arrangement of the annual Hamaganza holiday rock n roll charity benefit show that for 20 years had paired Dirtwoman with a revolving cast of Richmond politicians, luminaries and journalists. He died in his sleep at age 65 on September 26, 2017, falling short of his stated goal to "die at 90, onstage".

== Background ==
Corker grew up in the Oregon Hill neighborhood of Richmond, Virginia. He was formerly a streetwalker, and his name stems from an incident of "going to the bathroom in the back of a police car" after an arrest. He became locally known as a drag performer and street peddler, and later for his participation in Richmond food bank fund raisers such as Ham-a-Ganza. Style Weekly noted that Corker was also known for minor controversies such as supposedly gate crashing the inauguration of Virginia Governor Douglas Wilder. Corker claimed that he had a press pass that he'd obtained from a WANT station manager, but was still escorted off of the property and arrested. His 2017 death was reported on the front page, top-of-the-fold of the Richmond Times-Dispatch and featured nationally on NPR.

=== Mayoral candidacy ===
In May 2008, Corker announced his intentions to run for the office of mayor in Richmond. In an interview with Richmond.com, Corker described his reasons for running as "I think we need a change here in Richmond" and stated that he would like to improve city schools and reduce spending. However, Corker was eventually unable to collect the necessary number of signatures to be included on the ballot and was taken out of the race.

=== Felony conviction and voting rights ===
Corker had a previous felony conviction due to a sexual encounter in a public park, from which he lost the right to vote. Shortly after Tim Kaine took office, Corker petitioned Kaine for clemency and the restoration of his right to vote, which was granted after the Office of the Secretary of the Commonwealth found that he had no repeat offenses or DUI convictions in the time since his felony conviction.

=== Elliot in the Morning ===
Dirtwoman and his family (mother and sister) were frequent callers on the Elliot in the Morning show for several years. He appeared as a special guest at station events. He often talked about his love life, political views, and his numerous health issues. The show aired a tribute to his mother, Mae Corker, when she died in 2005. After his death, a memorial tribute also ran on the morning of September 27, 2017 in celebration of Dirt's involvement with the show.

=== The Dirtwoman Documentary ===
In 2017, Jerry Williams (AKA TVJerry) started a feature-length documentary on Donnie called "Spider Mites of Jesus." After interviewing more than 70 people and acquiring previously unseen video and photos, he started post-production. He also launched the website to post progress reports. The documentary premiered at the Virginia Film Festival in Charlottesville, VA on November 3, 2018. The "hometown" premiere" was at the Richmond International Film Festival in April, 2019. It played a total of 6 festivals in the US and one in Durban, South Africa.
