= Trinity Methodist Church (Richmond, Virginia) =

Historic church in Virginia, United States

- U.S. National Register of Historic Places
- Virginia Landmarks Register
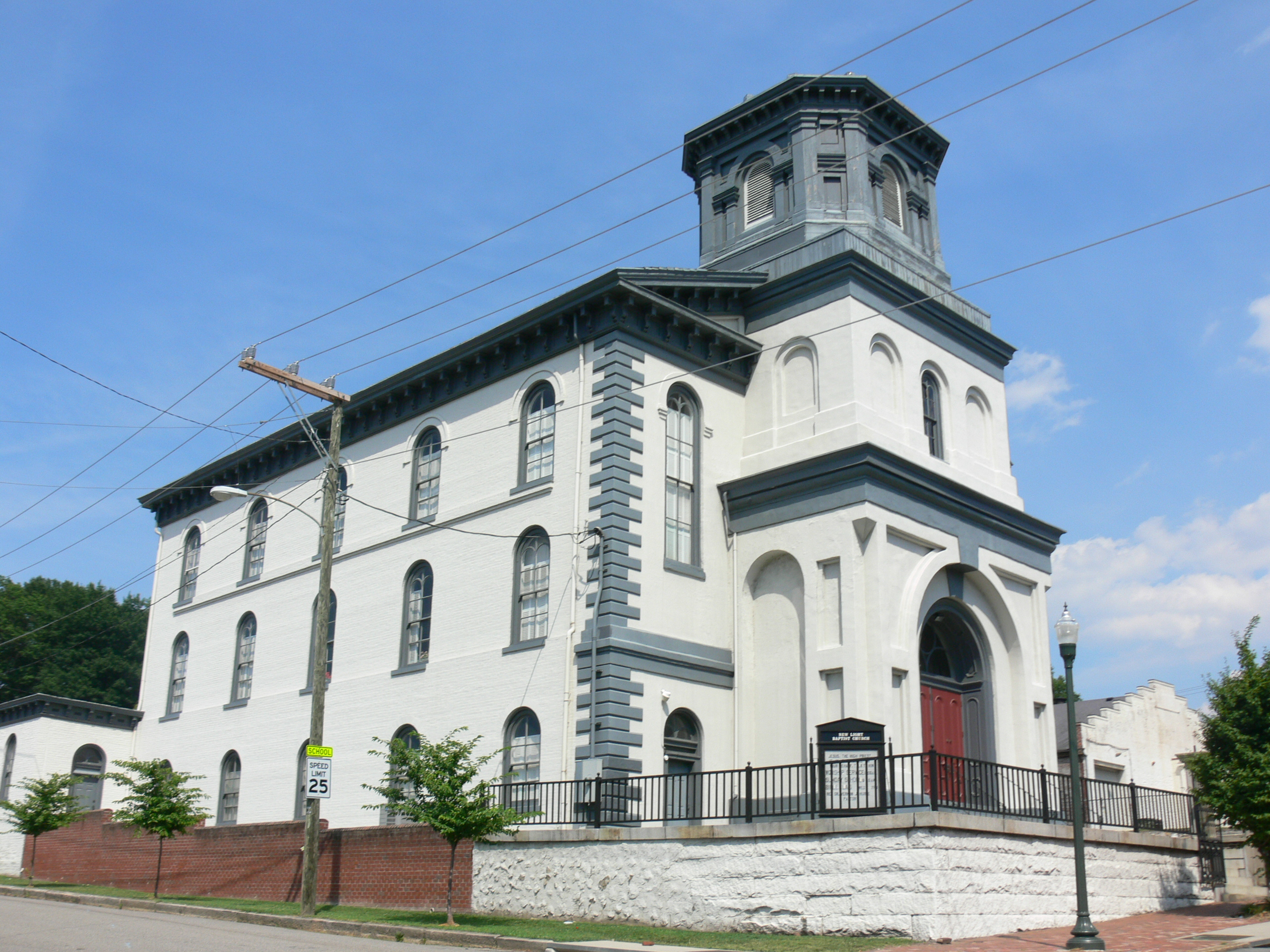
- Trinity Methodist Church, July 2011

- Location within Virginia Location within the United States
- Location: 2000 E. Broad St., Richmond, Virginia
- Coordinates: 37°32′4″N 77°25′24″W
- Area: less than one acre
- Built: 1859–1875
- Architect: West, Albert L.
- Architectural style: Italianate
- NRHP reference No.: 87000625
- VLR No.: 127-0401

Significant dates
- Added to NRHP: April 16, 1987
- Designated VLR: December 9, 1986

Trinity Methodist Church, also known as Trinity United Methodist Church and New Light Baptist Church, is a historic Methodist church located in Richmond, Virginia. It was built between 1859 and 1875, and is a three-story, Italianate style stuccoed brick structure. It features a three-stage central tower, with an octagonal third stage that rises above the ridge of the gable roof. The tower once had a fourth stage open octagonal belfry and spire, which was removed in 1955 after being damaged in Hurricane Hazel.

It was listed on the National Register of Historic Places in 1987.
