= Block 0-100 East Franklin Street Historic District =

Historic district in Virginia, United States

- U.S. National Register of Historic Places
- U.S. Historic district
- Virginia Landmarks Register
- Richmond City Historic District
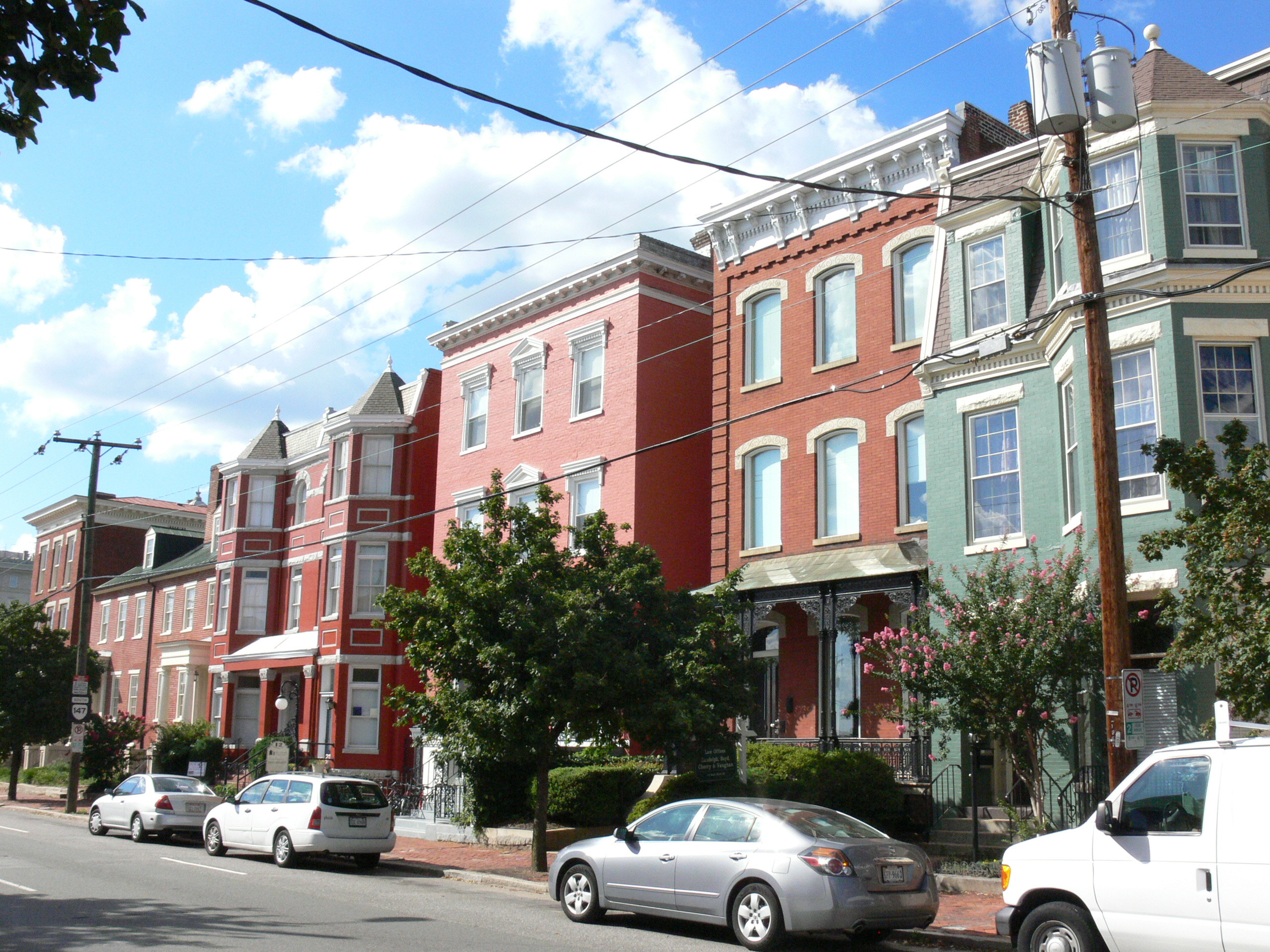
- North 00 Block E Main, July 2011

- Location within Virginia Location within the United States
- Location: Roughly bounded by 1st, Main, Foushee and Grace Sts., Richmond, Virginia
- Coordinates: 37°32′35″N 77°26′37″W
- Area: 5 acres (2.0 ha)
- Architect: Rogers, Isaiah; Et al.
- Architectural style: Greek Revival, Italianate, Queen Anne
- NRHP reference No.: 80004216
- VLR No.: 127-0317

Significant dates
- Added to NRHP: February 27, 1980
- Designated VLR: October 16, 1979

The Block 0-100 East Franklin Street Historic District is a national historic district located at Richmond, Virginia. It is located west of downtown. The district encompasses 21 contributing buildings built between about 1840 and 1920. The district is characterized by numerous mid- to late-19th century brick town houses in a variety of popular 19th-century architectural styles including Queen Anne, Italianate, and Greek Revival.

It was added to the National Register of Historic Places in 1980.
