= Antioch Pines Natural Area Preserve =

Nature preserve in Virginia, USA

- IUCN category IV (habitat/species management area)
- Location within Virginia
- Location: Isle of Wight County, Virginia
- Coordinates: 36°48′34″N 76°51′32″W
- Area: 1,157 acres (4.68 km^{2})
- Governing body: Virginia Department of Conservation and Recreation

The Antioch Pines Natural Area Preserve is a 1,157-acre (4.68 km^{2}) Natural Area Preserve located along the Blackwater River near Zuni, Virginia. It contains growths of loblolly pine and turkey oak, and supports various species that are rare in Virginia, including Plukenet's flatsedge, sandy-woods chaffhead and viperina; in addition, swales support various species of wildflowers, including orchids, trilliums, bellworts and lilies. Also on the property are a pair of longleaf pines which represent some of the last of the species in Virginia; they are currently the subject of a breeding program by the Virginia Department of Forestry designed to restore the pines to their former habitat.

The preserve is owned and maintained by the Virginia Department of Conservation and Recreation, and is open to public visitation only through prior arrangement with a state-employed land steward.

Antioch Pines is located adjacent to the Blackwater Ecological Preserve run by Old Dominion University, being located to its north.

== See also ==
- List of Virginia Natural Area Preserves
- List of Virginia state forests
- List of Virginia state parks
