= Cape Charles Coastal Habitat Natural Area Preserve =

Nature preserve in Virginia, US

Cape Charles Natural Area Preserve
- Location within Virginia Location within the United States
- Location: Northampton County, Virginia
- Coordinates: 37°15′17″N 76°1′10″W
- Area: 50 acres (20 ha)
- Governing body: Virginia Department of Conservation and Recreation

Cape Charles Natural Area Preserve is a 50-acre (20 ha) Natural Area Preserve located in Northampton County, Virginia on the Chesapeake Bay side of Virginia's Eastern Shore. The small preserve protects coastal beach, dune, and maritime forest habitat, preserving a home for the northeastern beach tiger beetle (Cicindela dorsalis), listed as threatened in the United States. Coast bedstraw (Galium hispidulum) grows on the dunes. The preserve serves as a staging area for southward-bound migratory birds in the fall.

Cape Charles Coastal Habitat Natural Area Preserve is owned and maintained by the Virginia Department of Conservation and Recreation, and is open to public. Public access is limited to a boardwalk that facilitates viewing the preserve; access to the beach is allowed only for research and management purposes.

All state laws in Virginia State Parks also apply in all of Virginia's Natural Area Preserves. The Department of Conservation and Recreation manages Virginia State Parks and the Natural Heritage Program. Law Enforcement Rangers with both the State Parks and Natural Heritage Program routinely patrol these areas, along with DWR and VMRC officers. All DCR Rangers have statewide jurisdiction.

== See also ==
- List of Virginia Natural Area Preserves
