= Hughlett Point Natural Area Preserve =

Protected area in Virginia, United States

- Location within Virginia
- Location: Northumberland County, Virginia
- Nearest city: Hardings
- Coordinates: 37°44′17″N 76°18′44″W
- Area: 204 acres (0.83 km^{2})
- Governing body: Virginia Department of Conservation and Recreation

Hughlett Point Natural Area Preserve is a 204-acre (0.83 km^{2}) Natural Area Preserve located in Northumberland County, Virginia. It preserves various types of habitat, including tidal and non-tidal wetlands, undeveloped beaches, dunes, and upland forests. Among the species living on the property is the northeastern beach tiger beetle, as well as other rare invertebrates. Hughlett Point is also an important staging area for various species of migrating bird.

Hughlett Point Natural Area Preserve is owned and maintained by the Virginia Department of Conservation and Recreation, and is open to the public. The preserve includes a parking area, trails, boardwalk, viewing platform, and educational signs. Access to portions of the shoreline is seasonally restricted to encourage use of the habitat by shore birds and other sensitive species.

== See also ==
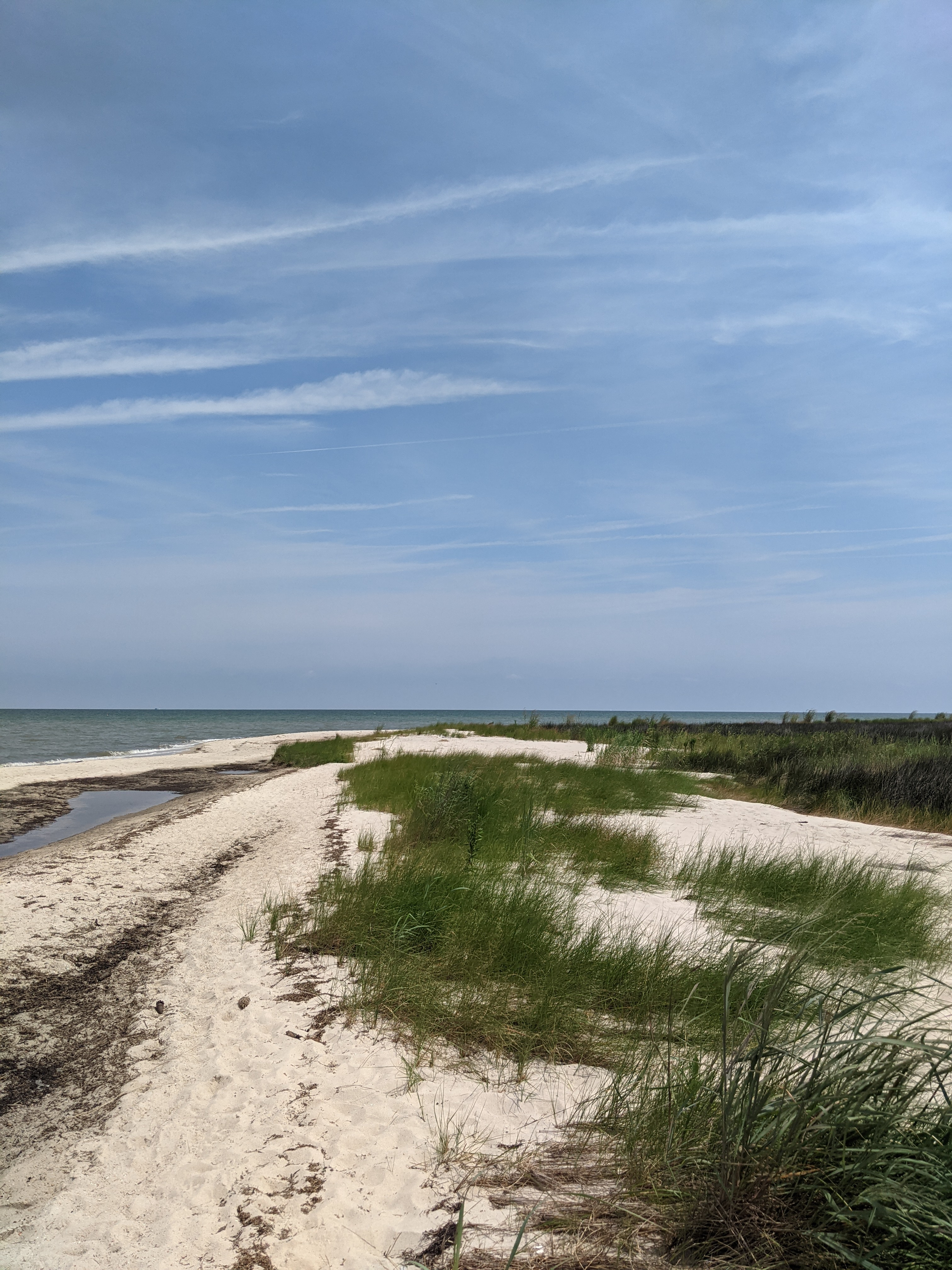
- Dunes at and beach at Hughlett Point
  List of Virginia Natural Area Preserves
