= Mount Joy Pond Natural Area Preserve =

Protected area in Virginia, US

- Location within Virginia
- Location: Augusta County, Virginia
- Coordinates: 37°56′08″N 79°09′03″W
- Area: 359 acres (1.45 km^{2})
- Governing body: Virginia Department of Conservation and Recreation

Mount Joy Pond Natural Area Preserve is a 359-acre (1.45 km^{2}) Natural Area Preserve located in Augusta County, Virginia in the United States. Located on the western side of the Blue Ridge Mountains, it supports a large population of the rare Virginia sneezeweed (Helenium virginicum). This and other plants are associated with a large sinkhole pond, the centerpiece of the property; fewer than two dozen such ponds remain in Augusta and neighboring Rockingham County. Much of the surrounding landscape consists of hardwoods and pines.

As of 2016, property managers are investigating why and how the sinkhole pond goes dry by early fall, despite historical photo evidence that the pond formerly retained water longer into the season. Management of the surrounding forestland, including thinning and prescribed burning, was planned with the goal of restoring the property's original hydrology.

The preserve is owned and maintained by the Virginia Department of Conservation and Recreation. It does not include improvements for public access, and visitors must make arrangements with a state-employed land steward prior to visiting.

== See also ==
- List of sinkholes of the United States
- List of Virginia Natural Area Preserves
