= Dameron Marsh Natural Area Preserve =

Nature preserve in Virginia, US

- Location within Virginia
- Location: Northumberland County, Virginia
- Nearest city: Hardings
- Coordinates: 37°46′55″N 76°17′57″W
- Area: 316 acres (128 ha)
- Governing body: Virginia Department of Conservation and Recreation

Dameron Marsh Natural Area Preserve is a 316-acre (128 ha) Natural Area Preserve located in Northumberland County, Virginia. It is one in a series of protected areas lining the shores of the Chesapeake Bay, and contains one of the region's most significant wetlands for marsh-bird habitats. Its pristine beaches serve as a home for the northeastern beach tiger beetle. Some of the land had been used in the past for agriculture, however these former fields were restored to forest through the combined efforts of the Virginia Department of Conservation and Recreation, The Nature Conservancy, and the United States Army Corps of Engineers.

The preserve is owned and maintained by the Virginia Department of Conservation and Recreation. Public access facilities, including a parking area, hiking trails, boardwalks, and a boat launch for small watercraft, are available. Portions of the preserve's shoreline are seasonally closed to public access to protect habitat for threatened species.

== See also ==
- List of Virginia Natural Area Preserves
