= Deep Run Ponds Natural Area Preserve =

Protected area in Virginia, US

- Location within Virginia
- Location: Rockingham County, Virginia
- Nearest city: Port Republic
- Coordinates: 38°16′33″N 78°46′36″W
- Area: 907 acres (3.67 km^{2})
- Governing body: Virginia Department of Conservation and Recreation

Deep Run Ponds Natural Area Preserve is a 907-acre (3.67 km^{2}) Natural Area Preserve in Rockingham County, Virginia. The preserve contains one of the largest remaining systems of Shenandoah Valley sinkhole ponds in Virginia. Such ponds are found in Rockingham and Augusta counties; their water levels fluctuate throughout the year. The preserve's eight sinkhole ponds support a variety of rare plant and animal life; two ponds support the rare Virginia sneezeweed (Helenium virginicum), while others contain black-fruited spikerush (Eleocharis melanocarpa), northern St. John's-wort (Hypericum boreale), Buxbaum's sedge (Carex buxbaumi), and northern bog clubmoss (Lycopodiella inundata).

The preserve is owned and maintained by the Virginia Department of Conservation and Recreation. It does not include improvements for public access, and visitors must make arrangements with a state-employed land steward prior to visiting.

== See also ==
- List of sinkholes of the United States
- List of Virginia Natural Area Preserves
