= Virginia State Route 89 =

State highway in western Virginia, US

State Route 89

Route information
- Maintained by VDOT
- Length: 7.85 mi (12.63 km)
- Existed: 1940–present

Major junctions
- South end: NC 89 near Galax
- SR 97 in Galax
- North end: US 58 / US 221 in Galax

Location
- Country: United States
- State: Virginia
- Counties: Grayson, City of Galax

Highway system
- Virginia Routes; Interstate; US; Primary; Secondary; Byways; History; HOT lanes
← SR 87	→ SR 90

State Route 89 (SR 89) is a primary state highway in the U.S. state of Virginia. The state highway runs 7.85 miles (12.63 km) from the North Carolina state line, where the highway continues as North Carolina Highway 89 (NC 89), north to U.S. Route 58 (US 58) and US 221 in Galax.

== Route description ==
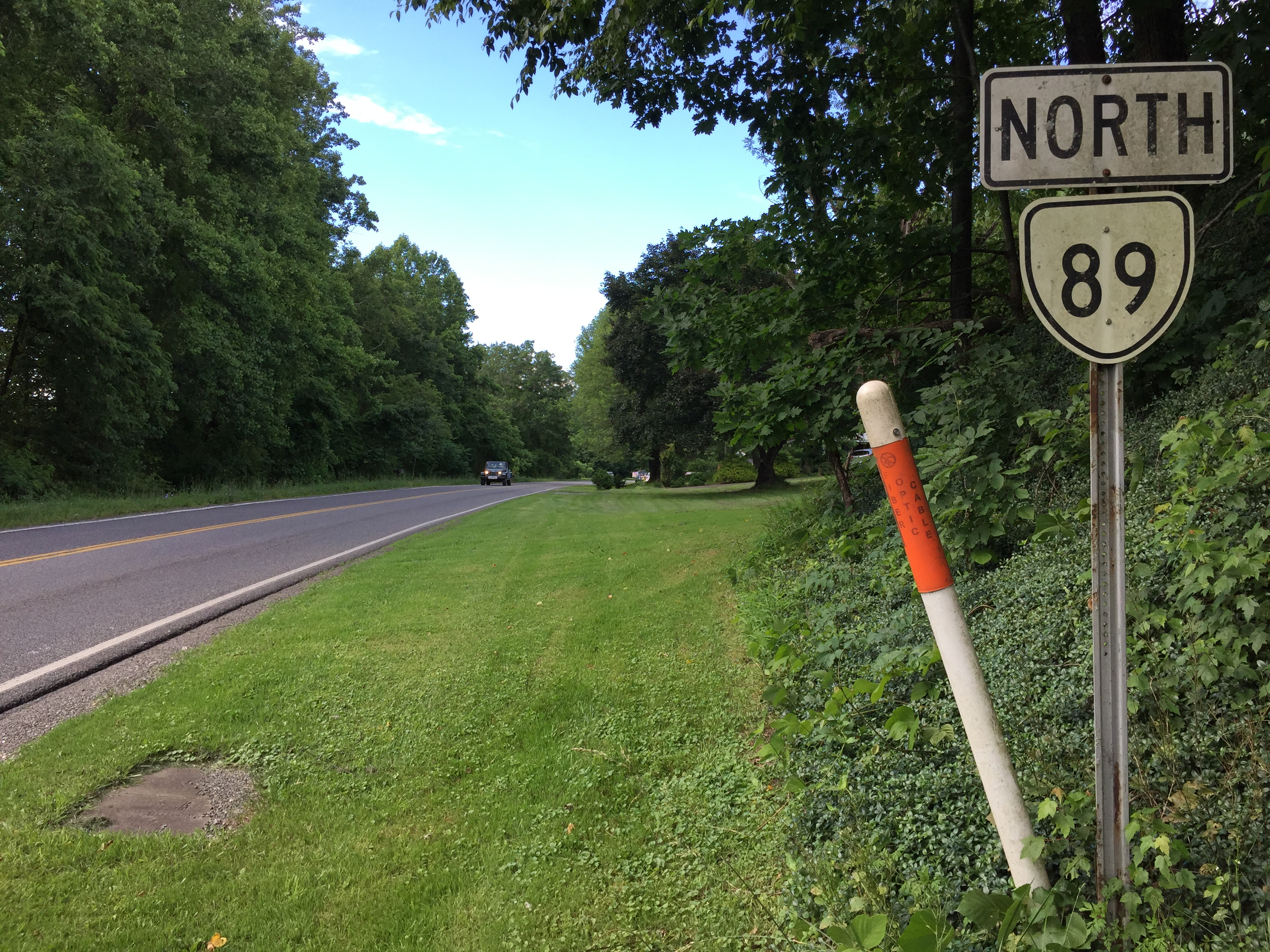
View north along SR 89 north of SR 865 in Galax

SR 89 begins at the North Carolina state line a short distance south of Low Gap, where the highway crosses the Eastern Continental Divide. The highway continues south as NC 89, which descends the Blue Ridge Mountains to the community of Lowgap in the valley of the Fisher River. After entering the watershed of the New River, SR 89 crosses the West Fork of Chestnut Creek and has an interchange with the Blue Ridge Parkway, which provides access to the Blue Ridge Music Center to the east. North of the parkway, the state highway intersects SR 613 (Edmonds Road), which leads west to Big Spring Bog Natural Area Preserve. SR 89 heads straight north as Skyline Highway to McCarmant Hill, where the highway leaves Grayson County and enters the independent city of Galax as Main Street. The state highway crosses Chestnut Creek twice before meeting the western end of SR 97 (Pipers Gap Road). SR 89 heads through downtown Galax before reaching its northern terminus at US 58 and US 221 (Stuart Drive).

== History ==
The whole route was added to the state highway system in 1928 as State Route 117. It was renumbered State Route 96 in the 1933 renumbering, and in the 1940 renumbering it was renumbered State Route 89 to match North Carolina Highway 89.

== Major intersections ==
County	Location	mi	km	Destinations	Notes
Grayson		0.00	0.00	NC 89 east – Mt. Airy, Winston-Salem	North Carolina state line; southern terminus
Grayson	Low Gap			Blue Ridge Parkway	Interchange
City of Galax		6.15	9.90	SR 97 east (Pipers Gap Road) – Pipers Gap	
City of Galax				SR 89 Truck north (Lineberry Road) to US 58	
City of Galax		7.85	12.63	US 58 / US 221 (Stuart Drive) to I-77	Northern terminus
1.000 mi = 1.609 km; 1.000 km = 0.621 mi

== VA 89 Truck ==
State Route 89 Truck
- Location: Galax

Virginia State Route 89 Truck in Galax, Virginia is Meadow Street from SR 89, one block north of the western terminus of SR 97 to US 58/US 221. It runs entirely along the east bank of Chestnut Creek.

< SR 116	District 1 State Routes; 1928–1933	SR 118 >
