= Cherry Orchard Bog Natural Area Preserve =

Nature preserve in Virginia, US

- Location within Virginia
- Location: Sussex and Prince George counties, Virginia
- Nearest city: Templeton, Virginia
- Coordinates: 37°02′43″N 77°17′41″W
- Area: 354 acres (143 ha)
- Governing body: Virginia Department of Conservation and Recreation

Cherry Orchard Bog Natural Area Preserve is a 354-acre (143 ha) Natural Area Preserve located in Sussex and Prince George counties, Virginia. The preserve is owned and maintained by the Virginia Department of Conservation and Recreation (DCR). It does not include improvements for public access, and visitors must make arrangements with a state-employed land steward prior to visiting. The preserve is located along the right of way for a power line, receiving acidic, low-nutrient groundwater.

== Plants and preservation ==
The site preserves a seepage wetland that supports a large collection of rare plants, including camass, bog-buttons, fringed orchids, and purple pitcher plants. This diverse community of plants has previously been maintained by frequent fires that prevented the long-term domination of woody plants. Since 2000, the DCR has managed the site with prescribed fire to expand and maintain the habitat for rare, fire-dependent plants. In 2014, the DCR began restoration work on the longleaf pines at the Cherry Orchard Bog preserve. Using a combination of tree removal, prescribed burning and planting, the DCR has managed to restore over 50 acres of industrial loblolly pine plantations to young longleaf pine communities.

== See also ==
- List of Virginia Natural Area Preserves
