= Redrock Mountain Natural Area Preserve =

Protected area in Virginia, United States

- Location within Virginia
- Location: Smyth County, Virginia
- Coordinates: 36°54′43″N 81°47′32″W
- Area: 640 acres (260 ha)
- Governing body: Virginia Department of Conservation and Recreation

Redrock Mountain Natural Area Preserve is a 640-acre (260 ha) Natural Area Preserve located in Smyth County, Virginia. The preserve is named for the 4,413-foot (1,345 m) Redrock Mountain, which itself is named for its red siltstone cliffs. It supports a number of rare natural features, and two natural community types, including examples of "mountain/piedmont basic woodlands" upon the mountain's slopes, and "rich cove/slope forests" in the preserve's lowlands. Five rare plant species are found on the property, including spring blue-eyed Mary (Collinsia verna), fringed scorpion-weed (Phacelia fimbriata), and Carey saxifrage (Saxifraga careyana).

The preserve was expanded with the purchase of 96 acres (39 ha) in 2016. The expansion connected the preserve with the Clinch Mountain Wildlife Management Area, located nearby.

The preserve is owned and maintained by the Virginia Department of Conservation and Recreation. It does not include improvements for public access, and visitors must make arrangements with a state-employed land steward prior to visiting.

== See also ==
- List of Virginia Natural Area Preserves
