= Bald Knob Natural Area Preserve =

State natural area preserve in Virginia, United States

- IUCN category IV (habitat/species management area)
- Location within Virginia Location within the United States
- Location: Franklin County, Virginia
- Coordinates: 36°59′59″N 79°52′41″W
- Area: 112 acres (45 ha)
- Established: 2016
- Governing body: Virginia Department of Conservation and Recreation

Bald Knob Natural Area Preserve is a state natural area preserve in Franklin County, Virginia. The preserve was established in 2016, and currently not open to the public. Bald Knob is one of few sites in the world home to the Piedmont fameflower.

== History ==
The Piedmont fameflower was first documented as a unique species in the Bald Knob Natural Area Preserve by the Virginia Natural Heritage Program. After decades of work, the preserve was established in 2016 with funding support by the Land & Water Conservation Fund and Virginia Land Conservation Foundation. In 2019, volunteers from the Virginia Master Naturalists helped to remove privet shrubs from the preserve. Later that year, the preserve was of three sites to which a total of 300 acres were added.

== See also ==
- List of Virginia state natural area preserves
