= Poor Mountain Natural Area Preserve =

Nature preserve in Virginia

- IUCN category V (protected landscape/seascape)
- Location within Virginia
- Location: Roanoke County, Virginia
- Nearest city: Salem
- Coordinates: 37°14′10″N 80°05′30″W
- Area: 1,404 acres (5.68 km^{2})
- Governing body: Virginia Department of Conservation and Recreation

Poor Mountain Natural Area Preserve is a 1,404-acre (568 ha) Natural Area Preserve located on Poor Mountain in Roanoke County, Virginia. The preserve protects the world's largest population of piratebush (Buckleya distichophylla), a globally rare parasitic shrub. The mountain derives its name from the fact that the soils on its slopes are poor, due to their base of metamorphosed sandstone bedrock. The preserve's pine-oak/heath woodlands include Table Mountain pine, eastern hemlock, several species of oak, and shrubs including huckleberry, mountain laurel, and fetterbush.

Poor Mountain Natural Area Preserve is owned and maintained by the Virginia Department of Conservation and Recreation. The preserve is open to the public, with improvements including a small parking area and four miles (6.4 km) of trails.

== See also ==
- List of Virginia Natural Area Preserves
