= Clover Hollow Natural Area Preserve =

Natural preserve and cave in Virginia, US

- IUCN category IV (habitat/species management area)
- Location within Virginia Location within the United States
- Location: Giles County, Virginia
- Coordinates: 37°20′31″N 80°27′43″W
- Area: 25 acres (10 ha)
- Established: 2005
- Governing body: Virginia Department of Conservation and Recreation

Clover Hollow Natural Area Preserve is a Natural Area Preserve located in Giles County, Virginia. The 25-acre (10 ha) preserve protects Stay High Cave, which houses seven rare cave-dwelling invertebrate species, three of which are only known from the county's Sinking Creek Valley. More common species, such as salamanders, crickets, harvestmen, spiders, crayfish, and bats, also live within the cave's streams, riparian mud banks, and drip pools. Most water in the cave stream comes from forested slopes.

The significance of the preserve was discovered in 1994, when speleologist Dave Hubbard inventoried the cave in response to local concerns. After both the Virginia Natural Heritage Program and the Cave Conservancy of the Virginias identified the cave as a conservation priority, the state took control of the site in 2005.

The preserve is owned and maintained by the Virginia Department of Conservation and Recreation. Access is strictly limited to activities related to data collection and monitoring.

== See also ==
- List of Virginia Natural Area Preserves
