= Unthanks Cave Natural Area Preserve =

Natural preserve and cave in Virginia (US)

- IUCN category III (natural monument or feature)
- Location within Virginia Location within the United States
- Location: Lee County, Virginia
- Coordinates: 36°36′52″N 83°13′36″W
- Area: 171 acres (69 ha)
- Established: 2004
- Governing body: Virginia Department of Conservation and Recreation

Unthanks Cave Natural Area Preserve is a 171-acre (69 ha) Natural Area Preserve in Lee County, Virginia. It protects the entrance to Unthanks Cave, which houses significant biological diversity and a wide variety of invertebrate life. The cave's streams drain a significant karst area south of the Powell River.

A rare species of hydrobiid snail was first discovered in Unthanks Cave in 1986. Holsingeria unthanksensis, also known as the thankless ghostsnail, has since been found in additional cave streams in Lee County, with an additional population noted 310 miles (500 km) north in Skyline Caverns. Additional unusual species found within the cave include a second hydrobiid snail, the Powell Valley planarian (Sphalloplana consimilis), the Southwest Virginia cave isopod (Caecidotea recurvata), and a cave-dwelling carabid beetle.

The only known entrance to the seven-mile-long (11 km) cave was purchased by The Nature Conservancy in 1987, and was the first cave system purchased in Virginia by the organization. The Nature Conservancy gave the property to the Virginia Department of Conservation and Recreation in 2004, although they continue to conduct research at the site.

Although previously popular with spelunkers due to the cave's large speleothems, Unthanks Cave is today gated and inaccessible except for official scientific monitoring and inquiry.

== See also ==
- List of Virginia Natural Area Preserves
