= Wreck Island Natural Area Preserve =

Nature preserve in Virginia

- IUCN category III (natural monument or feature)
- Location within Virginia
- Location: Northampton County, Virginia
- Coordinates: 37°16′0″N 75°47′57″W
- Area: 1,380 acres (5.6 km^{2})
- Governing body: Virginia Department of Conservation and Recreation

Wreck Island Natural Area Preserve is a 1,380-acre (5.6 km^{2}) Natural Area Preserve located in Northampton County, Virginia. One of the Virginia Barrier Islands, it protects various marsh, beach, grassland, dune, and shrubland habitats. It was designated as part of the National Audubon Society's "Barrier Island/Lagoon System Important Bird Area" for its importance as a nursery for nesting bird colonies. The island, which is slowly migrating towards the mainland, formerly featured dune-like mounds of shells which were destroyed by Hurricane Isabel.

The preserve is owned and maintained by the Virginia Department of Conservation and Recreation. It is open to the public seasonally, with access restricted between mid-April and early September to protect nesting birds. The preserve is accessible only by boat.

== Climate ==
The climate in this area is characterized by hot, humid summers and generally mild to cool winters. According to the Köppen Climate Classification system, Wreck Island has a humid subtropical climate, abbreviated "Cfa" on climate maps. It has a USDA hardiness zone of 8b.

Climate data for Wreck Island
Month	Jan	Feb	Mar	Apr	May	Jun	Jul	Aug	Sep	Oct	Nov	Dec	Year
Mean daily maximum °F (°C)	47.4 (8.6)	49.1 (9.5)	55.2 (12.9)	65.0 (18.3)	72.7 (22.6)	81.2 (27.3)	85.6 (29.8)	83.7 (28.7)	78.7 (25.9)	69.3 (20.7)	59.2 (15.1)	51.5 (10.8)	66.5 (19.2)
Mean daily minimum °F (°C)	33.0 (0.6)	34.1 (1.2)	39.9 (4.4)	49.3 (9.6)	58.8 (14.9)	67.8 (19.9)	72.7 (22.6)	71.6 (22.0)	66.4 (19.1)	55.5 (13.1)	44.9 (7.2)	37.6 (3.1)	52.6 (11.4)
Average precipitation inches (mm)	3.33 (85)	2.90 (74)	3.74 (95)	3.36 (85)	3.50 (89)	3.84 (98)	4.70 (119)	4.57 (116)	4.48 (114)	3.90 (99)	3.07 (78)	3.65 (93)	45.04 (1,144)
Source: PRISM

== See also ==
- List of Virginia Natural Area Preserves
