= Elk Lick =

Elk Lick or Elklick may refer to:

- Elk Lick, Ohio
- Elk Lick Township, Somerset County, Pennsylvania
- Elk Lick Lodge
- Elklick Woodlands Natural Area Preserve
