= Pinnacle Natural Area Preserve =

Nature reserve in Virginia

- IUCN category V (protected landscape/seascape)
- Location within Virginia
- Location: Russell County, Virginia
- Nearest city: Lebanon
- Coordinates: 36°57′32″N 82°03′07″W
- Area: 1,147 acres (4.64 km^{2})
- Governing body: Virginia Department of Conservation and Recreation

Pinnacle Natural Area Preserve is an 1,147-acre (464 ha) Natural Area Preserve in Russell County, Virginia. Located at the confluence of the Clinch River and Big Cedar Creek, the preserve's namesake and centerpiece is the Pinnacle, a dolomite formation rising 400 feet (120 m) above the creek.

At least nine rare species and two rare natural communities make their home within the boundaries of the preserve. It is home to the globally rare Big Cedar Creek millipede (Brachoria falcifera), known only from the preserve and several nearby locations. Two globally rare plants, Canby's mountain-lover (Paxistima canbyi) and Carolina saxifrage (Saxifraga caroliniana), grow upon the preserve's limestone cliffs, where they are joined by American harebell (Campanula rotundifolia), which is rare in Virginia. The preserve's creek banks host the rare glade spurge (Euphorbia purpurea).

Pinnacle Natural Area Preserve is owned and maintained by the Virginia Department of Conservation and Recreation. The preserve includes improvements such as a parking area, four miles (6.4 km) of hiking trails, and a suspension foot bridge.

== See also ==
- List of Virginia Natural Area Preserves
