= Difficult Creek Natural Area Preserve =

Protected area in Virginia, US

- IUCN category IV (habitat/species management area)
- Location within Virginia
- Location: Halifax County, Virginia
- Nearest city: Scottsburg
- Coordinates: 36°45′15″N 78°44′03″W
- Area: 819 acres (3.31 km^{2})
- Governing body: Virginia Department of Conservation and Recreation

Difficult Creek Natural Area Preserve is an 819-acre (3.31 km^{2}) Natural Area Preserve located in Halifax County, Virginia. The preserve aims to restore a portion of Virginia's southern Piedmont to pre-settlement conditions, when the region was dominated by savannas maintained through a natural fire regime. These savannas featured open, prairie-like areas with scattered pines and hardwoods. Management of the preserve includes utilizing prescribed burns and removing loblolly pine plantations to restore the former landscape. Several rare plants, remnants of the original prairie vegetation, survived by colonizing roadsides and power lines; these plants are now protected and encouraged within the preserve.

The preserve is owned and maintained by the Virginia Department of Conservation and Recreation, and is open to the public. The preserve includes about two miles (3.2 km) of fire breaks which may be used by hikers.

== See also ==
- List of Virginia Natural Area Preserves
