= Northwest River Natural Area Preserve =

Natural Area Preserve in Chesapeake, Virginia

- Location within Virginia
- Location: City of Chesapeake, Virginia
- Coordinates: 36°34′48″N 76°12′22″W
- Area: 2,788 acres (11.28 km^{2})
- Governing body: Virginia Department of Conservation and Recreation

Northwest River Natural Area Preserve is a 2,788-acre (11.28 km^{2}) Natural Area Preserve located in the city of Chesapeake, Virginia. Located along the Northwest River, the preserve protects upland forests as well as swamps and marshes along the river.

The preserve is home to numerous rare species of plants and animals; those found in the forest include silky camellia (Stewartia malacodendron) and canebrake rattlesnakes (Crotalus horridus), while the swamps host Dismal Swamp southeastern shrews (Sorex longirostris fisheri), epiphytic sedge (Carex decomposita), and Dukes' skipper (Euphyes dukesi). Sawgrass (Cladium jamaicense), winged seedbox (Ludwigia alata), and little grass frogs (Pseudacris ocularis) can be found in the preserve's marshes.

Northwest River Natural Area Preserve is owned and maintained by the Virginia Department of Conservation and Recreation. It does not include improvements for public access, and visitors must make arrangements with a state-employed land steward prior to visiting.

== See also ==
- List of Virginia Natural Area Preserves
