= Chestnut Creek Wetlands Natural Area Preserve =

Nature preserve in Virginia, US

- IUCN category IV (habitat/species management area)
- Location within Virginia
- Location: Floyd County, Virginia
- Nearest city: Willis, Virginia
- Coordinates: 36°50′34″N 80°26′54″W
- Area: 244 acres (99 ha)
- Governing body: Virginia Department of Conservation and Recreation

Chestnut Creek Wetlands Natural Area Preserve is a 244-acre (99 ha) Natural Area Preserve located in Floyd County, Virginia, United States. Local wetlands support several rare species, while the upland slopes support northern hardwoods including beech, birch, and maple. The area has a long farming and grazing history, but the wetlands have survived, dominated by sedges and grasses with few trees and shrubs. The property was acquired using a voter-approved state government bond and a recovery grant from the United States Fish and Wildlife Service.

The preserve is owned and maintained by the Virginia Department of Conservation and Recreation, which focuses of preserving the wetlands vegetation. The site does not include improvements for public access, and visitors must make arrangements with a state-employed land steward prior to visiting.

== See also ==
- List of Virginia Natural Area Preserves
