= Grayson Glades Natural Area Preserve =

Protected area in Virginia, United States

- Location within Virginia
- Location: Grayson County, Virginia
- Coordinates: 36°35′10″N 80°54′28″W
- Area: 53 acres (21 ha)
- Governing body: Virginia Department of Conservation and Recreation

Grayson Glades Natural Area Preserve is a 53-acre (21 ha) Natural Area Preserve located in Grayson County, Virginia. Its centerpiece is an extremely rare wetland type known as a "mafic fen", which are situated upon soils rich in magnesium and fed by springs. The site is at the headwaters of a small stream system supporting additional mafic fens.

Among the rare species found on the property are tuberous grass-pink (Calopogon tuberosus), ten-angled pipewort (Eriocaulon decangulare var. decangulare), large-leaved grass-of-parnassus (Parnassia grandifolia), queen-of-the-prairie (Filipendula rubra), sticky false-asphodel (Triantha glutinosa) and Canada burnet (Sanguisorba canadensis).

The preserve is owned and maintained by the Virginia Department of Conservation and Recreation. It does not include improvements for public access, and visitors must make arrangements with a state-employed land steward prior to visiting.

== See also ==
- List of Virginia Natural Area Preserves
