= Buffalo Mountain Natural Area Preserve =

Nature preserve in Virginia, US

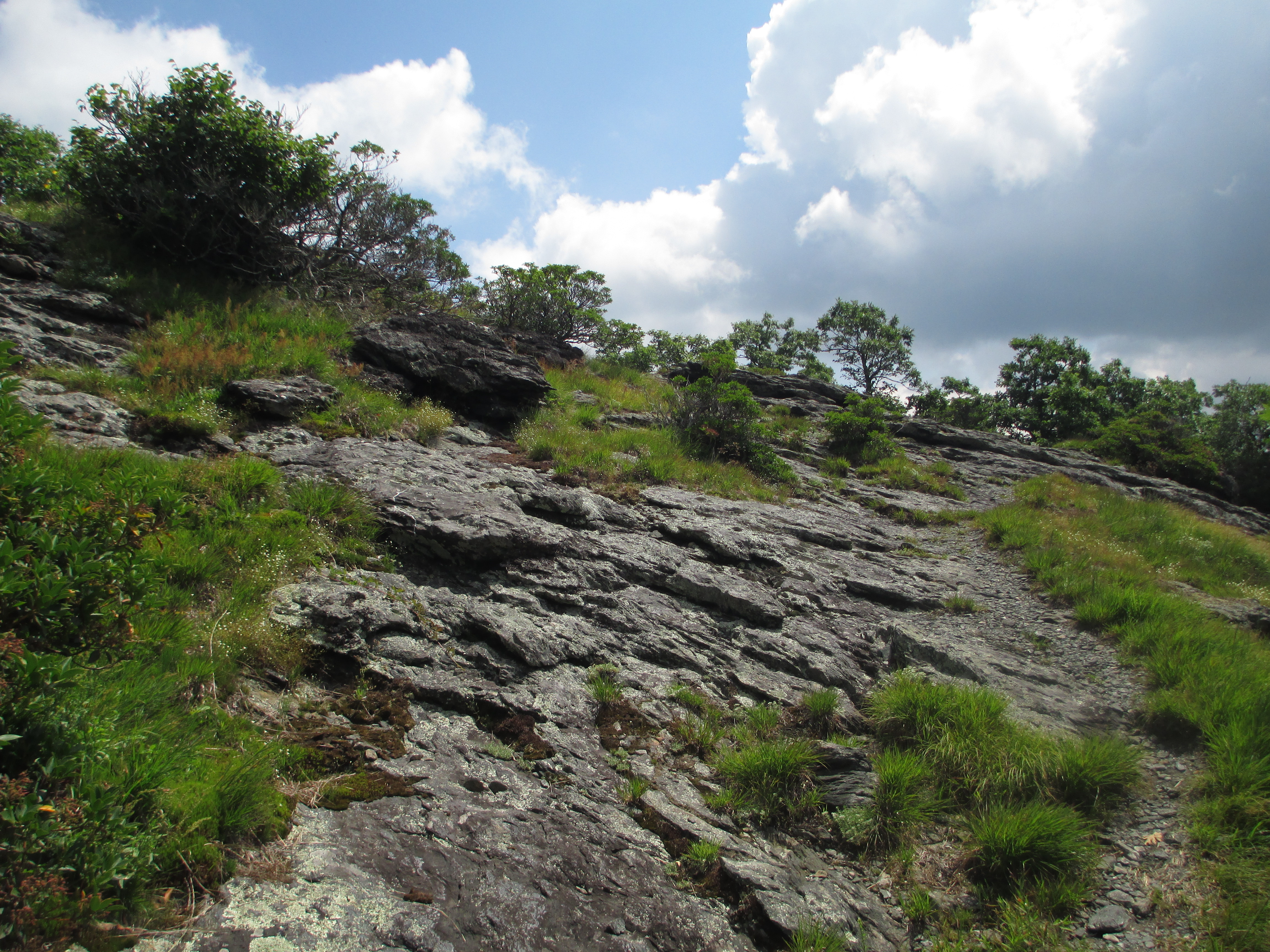
- Near Buffalo Mountain's treeless summit

- Location within Virginia Location within the United States
- Location: Floyd County, Virginia
- Coordinates: 36°47′45″N 80°28′37″W
- Area: 1,146 acres (4.64 km^{2})
- Governing body: Virginia Department of Conservation and Recreation

Buffalo Mountain Natural Area Preserve is a 1,146-acre (4.64 km^{2}) Natural Area Preserve in Floyd County, Virginia.

== Description ==
Buffalo Mountain Natural Area Preserve covers the summit and slopes of Buffalo Mountain, a 3,960-foot (1,210 m) peak in southwest Virginia. It is open to the public and includes a small parking area from which an approximately one-mile-long (1.6 km) trail may be traversed to reach the summit.

The treeless summit is home to rare plant species including three-toothed cinquefoil (Sibbaldia tridentata) and Rocky Mountain woodsia (Physematium scopulinum); other rare plants, such as bog bluegrass (Poa paludigena) and large-leaved grass-of-Parnassus (Parnassia grandifolia), are found at seeps along the mountain's base. In total, the preserve protects thirteen rare plant occurrences, three rare animal occurrences, and six significant natural communities. Buffalo Mountain is also the only place in the world where the mealybug Puto kosztarabi is known to live.

== See also ==
- List of Virginia Natural Area Preserves
