= Grassy Hill Natural Area Preserve =

Conservation area in Virginia, United States

- IUCN category V (protected landscape/seascape)
- Location within Virginia
- Location: Franklin County, Virginia
- Nearest city: Rocky Mount, Virginia
- Coordinates: 37°00′22″N 79°55′12″W
- Area: 1,440 acres (5.8 km^{2})
- Governing body: Virginia Department of Conservation and Recreation

Grassy Hill Natural Area Preserve is a 1,440-acre (5.8 km^{2}) Natural Area Preserve located in Franklin County, Virginia, just to the west of the town of Rocky Mount. The site is composed of rocky slopes with various hardwood species and patches of Virginia pine. Shallow basic soils, typified by heavy clay, are found among bedrock outcrops rich in magnesium. Rare woodland communities live upon these substrates, and numerous rare plants may be found within grassy forest clearings near the summit. Evidence at the preserve suggests that the majority of the site was once more open, and may have historically been maintained through a natural fire regime that has been suppressed during modern times.

The preserve is owned and maintained by the Virginia Department of Conservation and Recreation, and is open to the public. Public facilities at the preserve include 6.6 miles (10.6 km) of hiking trails, educational signs, parking, and a kiosk.

== See also ==
- List of Virginia Natural Area Preserves
