= Johnsons Creek Natural Area Preserve =

Protected area in Virginia, US

- Location within Virginia
- Location: Alleghany County, Virginia
- Coordinates: 37°50′04″N 80°04′51″W
- Area: 99 acres (40 ha)
- Established: 1990
- Governing body: Virginia Department of Conservation and Recreation

Johnsons Creek Natural Area Preserve is a 99-acre (40 ha) Natural Area Preserve located in Alleghany County, Virginia. It contains a variety of trees, including ancient red cedars, oaks, and pines, all of which stand on steep shale bluffs overlooking Johnsons Creek.

The preserve protects a type of natural community known as a shale barrens. Shale barrens are typified by thin soils on south-facing slopes, and feature hot, dry conditions. They are rare in the eastern United States; within Virginia, this type of landscape is restricted largely to the Ridge and Valley region. Several rare plants are found at Johnsons Creek Natural Area Preserve, including the shale-barren rockcress (Boechera serotina).

Johnsons Creek Natural Area Preserve was initially purchased by The Nature Conservancy, and was dedicated as a Natural Area Preserve in 1990. The preserve is owned and maintained by the Virginia Department of Conservation and Recreation. It does not include improvements for public access, and visitors must make arrangements with a state-employed land steward prior to visiting.

== See also ==
- List of Virginia Natural Area Preserves
