= Cave Hill Natural Area Preserve =

State natural area preserve in Virginia, United States

- IUCN category IV (habitat/species management area)
- Location within Virginia Location within the United States
- Location: Augusta County, Virginia
- Coordinates: 38°15′20″N 78°50′08″W
- Area: 89 acres (36 ha)
- Established: 2020
- Governing body: Virginia Department of Conservation and Recreation

Cave Hill Natural Area Preserve is a state natural area preserve in Augusta County, Virginia. It is currently not open to the public. The preserve was established in 2020 by a partnership of the Virginia Department of Conservation and Recreation, the Cave Conservancy of the Virginias, and trustees of the DuPont Natural Resource Damage Assessment and Restoration Fund. Cave Hill includes Stegers Fissure, part of Grand Caverns, and Madisons Saltpetre Cave, where the Madison Cave isopod was discovered. As well, the preserve is home to six globally rare invertebrae, making it the highest ranking for biodiversity significance in Virginia.

== History ==
Madisons Saltpetre Cave was explored by multiple founding fathers. European settlers mined the caves of the reserve for saltpetre nitrogen deposits, used to manufacture gunpowder, converting the site into a strong economic engine. The Madison Cave Isopod was first discovered in the cave by Tom Barr and John Holsinger in 1958. In 2020, after several attempts by the DCR to formally conserve Cave Hill, the Cave Conservancy of the Virginias bought the land.

== See also ==
- List of Virginia state natural area preserves
