= Biscuit Run Park =

County Park in Virginia, United States

- Interactive map of Biscuit Run Park
- Location: Albemarle County, Virginia, United States
- Coordinates: 37.9823°N 78.5072869°W
- Area: 1,190-acre (1.86 sq mi)
- Created: 2024
- Operator: Albemarle County Parks and Recreation
- Open: All year
- Website: Official Website

Biscuit Run Park is a 1,190-acre (1.86 sq mi) county park located in Albemarle County, Virginia, United States, just south of the city of Charlottesville. The park officially opened on December 14, 2024. It is the largest park in the county.

== History ==
The park property was originally planned for a large residential housing development. In January 2010, as real estate values reeled from the burst housing bubble and ensuing recession, the Commonwealth of Virginia and the Virginia Department of Conservation and Recreation negotiated the purchase of the property from developer Forest Lodge, LLC for $21.48 million in cash and tax credits.

The land was purchased with the intention of creating a state park, but the Virginia General Assembly never provided the necessary funding and the idea was abandoned. In January 2018, Albemarle County reached an agreement on a 99-year lease of the property from the Commonwealth with the intention to create a county park.

Construction on the 550-acre (0.86 sq mi) first phase of the park began in March 2024 and was completed in November of that year.

== Amenities ==
The park currently contains over eight miles of trails for both hiking and biking, along with bathrooms and a parking lot. When complete, the park is expected to have additional trails, basketball courts, a mountain biking course, grass playing fields, playgrounds, dog parks, and other improvements. The majority of the park is protected forestland.
