= Mutton Hunk Fen Natural Area Preserve =

Protected area in Virginia, US

- Location within Virginia
- Location: Accomack County, Virginia
- Coordinates: 37°46′15″N 75°34′28″W
- Area: 516 acres (2.09 km^{2})
- Governing body: Virginia Department of Conservation and Recreation

Mutton Hunk Fen Natural Area Preserve is a 516-acre (2.09 km^{2}) Natural Area Preserve located in Accomack County, Virginia. Fronting on the Atlantic Ocean's Gargathy Bay to the east, it is also bounded by Whites Creek and Mutton Hunk Branch to its north. The property contains a rare "sea level fen" community, one of only four in Virginia. Despite the proximity to the ocean's saltwater, freshwater wetland plants are able to survive in this environment due to the influence of freshwater springs. Acidic conditions also encourage the growth of plants normally found in bogs, in addition to tidal freshwater wetland plants; five of the species found at the preserve are regionally rare.

Mutton Hunk Fen Natural Area Preserve is owned and maintained by the Virginia Department of Conservation and Recreation, and is open to the public. Improvements at the preserve include a parking area and trails to view the marsh and Whites Creek.

All state laws in Virginia State Parks also apply in all of Virginia's Natural Area Preserves. The Department of Conservation and Recreation manages Virginia State Parks and the Natural Heritage Program. Law Enforcement Rangers with both the State Parks and Natural Heritage Program routinely patrol these areas, along with DWR and VMRC officers. All DCR Rangers have statewide jurisdiction.

== See also ==
- List of Virginia Natural Area Preserves
