= Bush Mill Stream Natural Area Preserve =

Nature preserve in Virginia, US

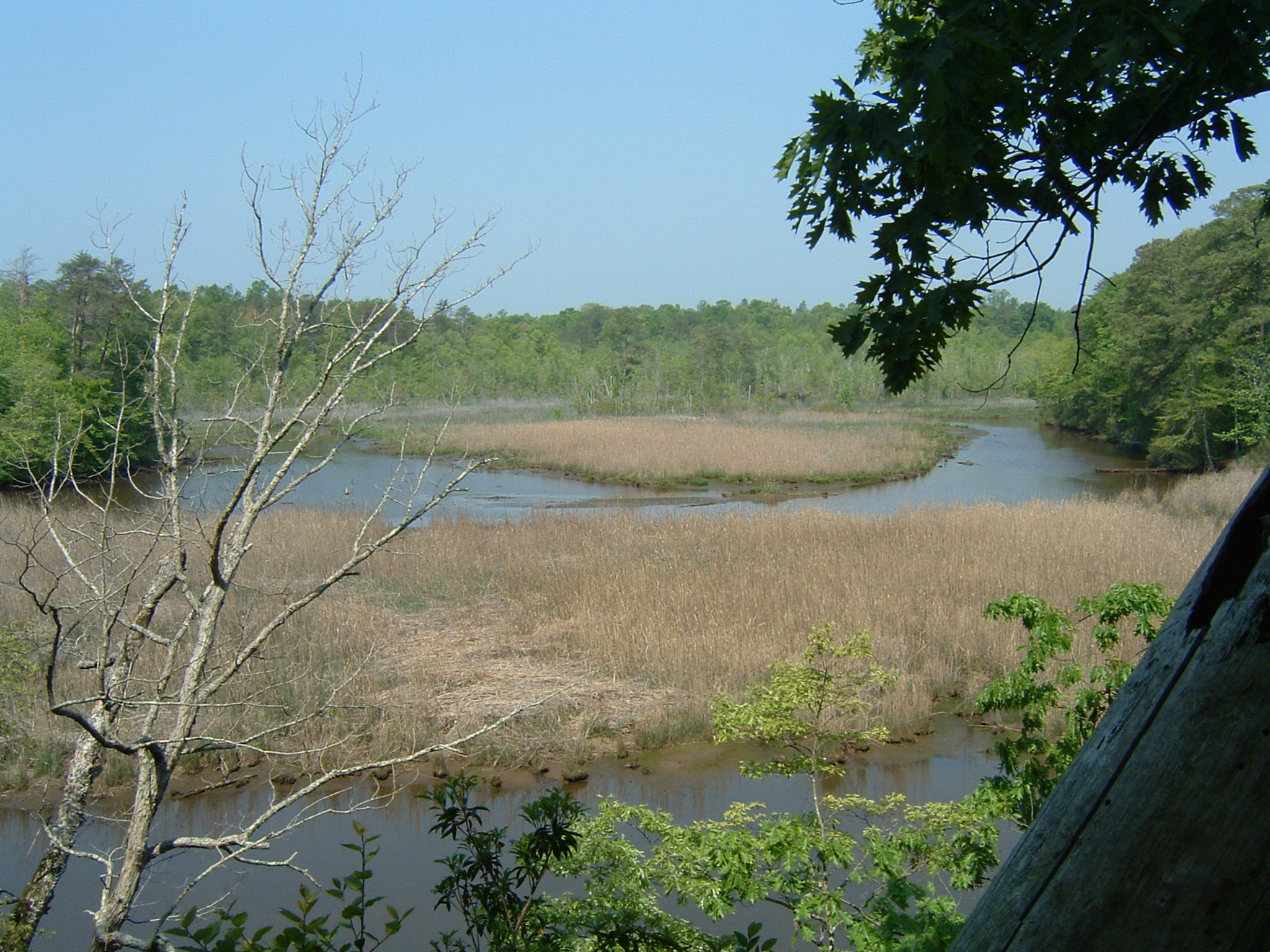
- Bush Mill Stream as seen from the observation deck

- Location within Virginia Location within the United States
- Location: Northumberland County, Virginia
- Coordinates: 37.8724°N 76.4486°W
- Area: 144 acres (58 ha)
- Governing body: Virginia Department of Conservation and Recreation

Bush Mill Stream Natural Area Preserve is a 144-acre (58 ha) Natural Area Preserve in Northumberland County, Virginia. The preserve protects an area of fresh and brackish tidal wetlands at the confluence of the freshwater Bush Mill Stream and the saltwater Great Wicomico River, which serves as important habitat for numerous species of birds.

The preserve is open to the public during daylight hours and contains hiking trails, a boardwalk over the stream, an observation deck, and signs about the history of the stream. It is owned and maintained by the Virginia Department of Conservation and Recreation.

== See also ==
- List of Virginia Natural Area Preserves
