= Pedlar Hills Glades Natural Area Preserve =

Natural preserve in Virginia, US

- IUCN category IV (habitat/species management area)
- Location within Virginia
- Location: Montgomery County, Virginia
- Nearest city: Blacksburg
- Coordinates: 37°13′10″N 80°14′24″W
- Area: 1,177 acres (4.76 km^{2})
- Governing body: Virginia Department of Conservation and Recreation

Pedlar Hills Glades Natural Area Preserve is a 1,177-acre (4.76 km^{2}) Natural Area Preserve located in Montgomery County, Virginia. Rising over the South Fork of the Roanoke River, it supports numerous rare plants and natural communities, including a dolomite barren. Among the species found within the preserve are tall gay-feather (Liatris aspera) and Addison's leatherflower (Clematis addisonii), the latter endemic to Virginia.

The preserve is owned and maintained by the Virginia Department of Conservation and Recreation. It does not include improvements for public access, and visitors must make arrangements with a state-employed land steward prior to visiting.

== See also ==
- List of Virginia Natural Area Preserves
