= Cowbane Prairie Natural Area Preserve =

Protected area in Virginia, U.S.

- Location within Virginia
- Location: Augusta County, Virginia
- Nearest city: Stuarts Draft
- Coordinates: 38°01′20″N 79°03′30″W
- Area: 156 acres (63 ha)
- Governing body: Virginia Department of Conservation and Recreation

Cowbane Prairie Natural Area Preserve is a 156-acre (63 ha) Natural Area Preserve located in Augusta County, Virginia, along the western slope of the Blue Ridge in the Shenandoah Valley. It preserves both mesic and wet prairie habitats, as well as a calcareous spring-fed marsh; these areas contain eleven regionally rare plants such as queen-of-the-prairie, blueflag iris, and marsh-speedwell. Although common in the Midwest, these plants occur only at a handful of sites in Virginia.

The preserve is owned and maintained by the Virginia Department of Conservation and Recreation. It does not include improvements for public access, and visitors must make arrangements with a state-employed land steward prior to visiting.

== See also ==
- List of Virginia Natural Area Preserves
