= Chestnut Ridge Natural Area Preserve =

Nature preserve in Virginia, United States

- IUCN category V (protected landscape/seascape)
- Location within Virginia
- Location: Giles and Bland counties, Virginia
- Nearest city: Narrows, Virginia
- Coordinates: 37°17′47″N 80°58′54″W
- Area: 1,596 acres (646 ha)
- Established: 2006
- Owner: Virginia Department of Conservation and Recreation
- Website: www.dcr.virginia.gov/natural-heritage/natural-area-preserves/chestnutridge

Chestnut Ridge Natural Area Preserve is a Natural Area Preserve located in Giles and Bland counties, Virginia. A 1,596-acre (646 ha) tract of old-growth forest, it is dominated by northern red oak and chestnut oak. The extent of unbroken forest on the property is unusual for southwestern Virginia; many of the trees, including cucumber magnolia and American basswood, are between three and four hundred years old.

The preserve was privately owned from its establishment in 2006 until 2020, when the Virginia Department of Conservation and Recreation purchased the property.

In May 2023, the preserve expanded by 775 acres to its current size, adding 1.5 miles of riparian forest along Dry Fork, a stream that contains native trout.

== See also ==
- List of Virginia Natural Area Preserves
