= Blackwater Sandhills Natural Area Preserve =

State park in Virginia, United States

- IUCN category IV (habitat/species management area)
- Location within Virginia Location within the United States
- Location: Isle of Wight, Virginia
- Coordinates: 36°56′01″N 76°50′10″W
- Area: 815 acres (330 ha)
- Established: 2012
- Governing body: Virginia Department of Conservation and Recreation

Blackwater Sandhills Natural Area Preserve is a state natural area preserve in Isle of Wight, Virginia. The preserve is not open to the public. The site is owned by Isle of Wight county. The preserve was established in 2012.

== Ecology and restoration ==
The upland portions of the preserve consist of over 300 acres of sandhills and upland forests. Reforestation and prescribed burning are used to restore Longleaf Pine and Scrub Oak Sandhill communities. The preserve also includes 500 acres of old-growth tupelo-baldcypress bottomland forest and protects approximately five miles of the Blackwater River.

== See also ==
- List of Virginia state natural area preserves
