= Savage Neck Dunes Natural Area Preserve =

Nature preserve in Virginia

- IUCN category V (protected landscape/seascape)
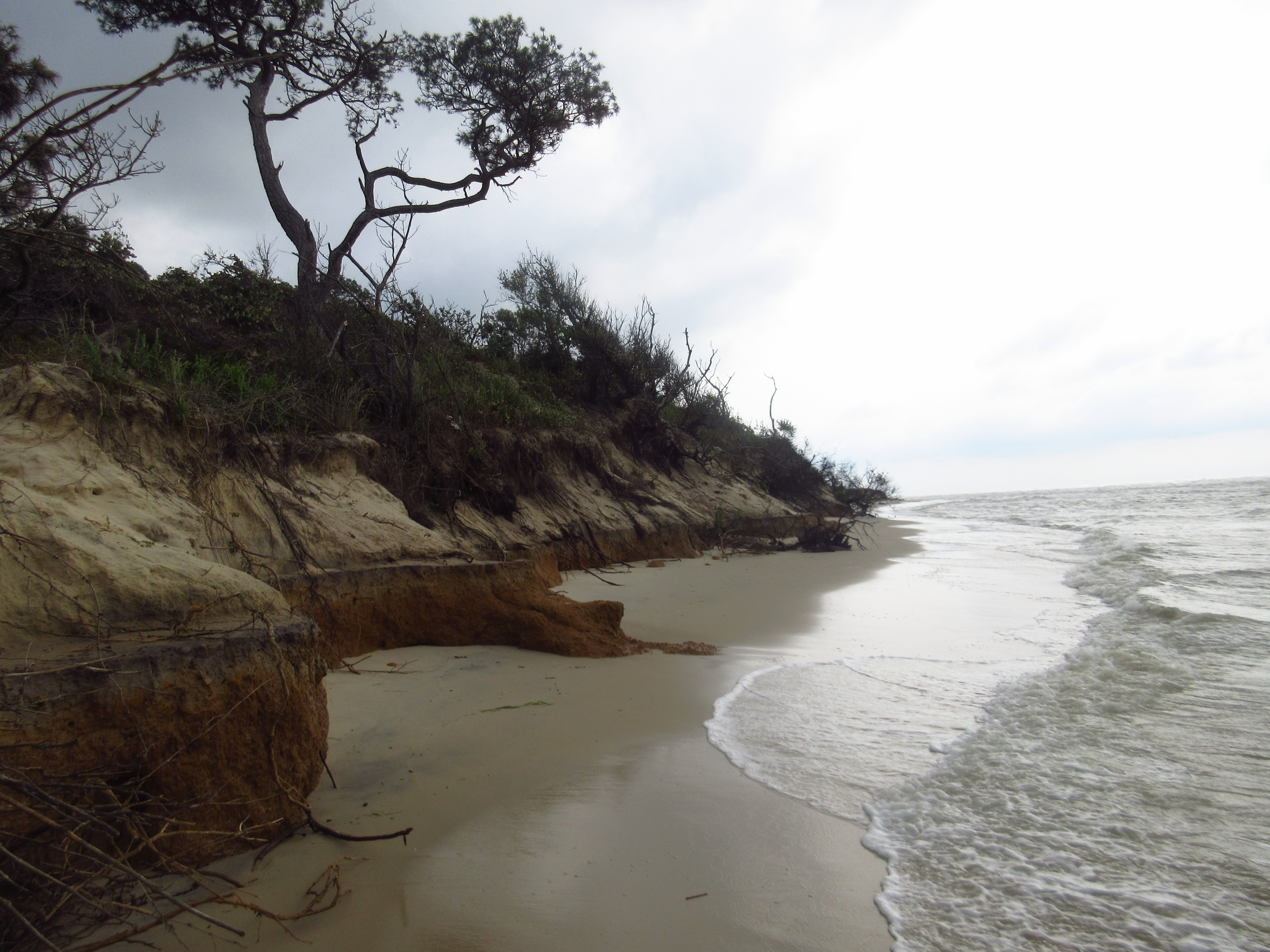

- Location within Virginia
- Location: Northampton County, Virginia
- Coordinates: 37°19′34″N 76°0′42″W
- Area: 298 acres (121 ha)
- Governing body: Virginia Department of Conservation and Recreation

Savage Neck Dunes Natural Area Preserve is a 298-acre (121 ha) Natural Area Preserve located in Northampton County, Virginia on the Chesapeake Bay. Fifty-foot-tall (15 m) dunes within the preserve are among the highest points on Virginia's Eastern Shore. The preserve contains beach, dune, and maritime forest natural communities of various sorts, as well as habitat for migratory songbirds and northeastern beach tiger beetles. Regionally rare plants at the preserve include Engelmann's umbrella-sedge (Cyperus engelmannii), dwarf burhead (Echinodorus tenellus), and southern bladderwort (Utricularia juncea).

The plot of land was named after Thomas Savage, a teenaged boy who arrived in Virginia in 1608 and lived with natives as a liaison. Debedeavon of the Accomac people gifted Savage 9,000 acres (14 sq mi) of land on the eastern shore.

The preserve is owned and maintained by the Virginia Department of Conservation and Recreation, and is open to the public. Improvements at the site include three trails that have been marked off for hiking, and there is a small public parking area near the entrance.

All state laws in Virginia State Parks also apply in all of Virginia's Natural Area Preserves. The Department of Conservation and Recreation manages Virginia State Parks and the Natural Heritage Program. Law Enforcement Rangers with both the State Parks and Natural Heritage Program routinely patrol these areas, along with DWR and VMRC officers. All DCR Rangers have statewide jurisdiction.

== See also ==
- List of Virginia Natural Area Preserves
