= Big Spring Bog Natural Area Preserve =

Nature preserve in Virginia, US

- Location within Virginia
- Location: Grayson County, Virginia
- Coordinates: 36°34′4.2″N 80°55′39.5″W
- Area: 50 acres (20 ha)
- Governing body: Virginia Department of Conservation and Recreation

Big Spring Bog Natural Area Preserve is a 50-acre (20 ha) Natural Area Preserve located in Grayson County, Virginia. The terrain is hilly, and within its borders is Chestnut Creek, a tributary of the New River. The preserve features a rare wetland known as a "cranberry glade".

The preserve is owned and maintained by the Virginia Department of Conservation and Recreation, and is open to public visitation only through prior arrangement with a state-employed land steward.

== See also ==
- Cranberry Glades
- List of Virginia Natural Area Preserves
- List of Virginia state forests
- List of Virginia state parks
