= Bethel Beach Natural Area Preserve =

Nature preserve in Virginia, U.S.

- IUCN category IV (habitat/species management area)
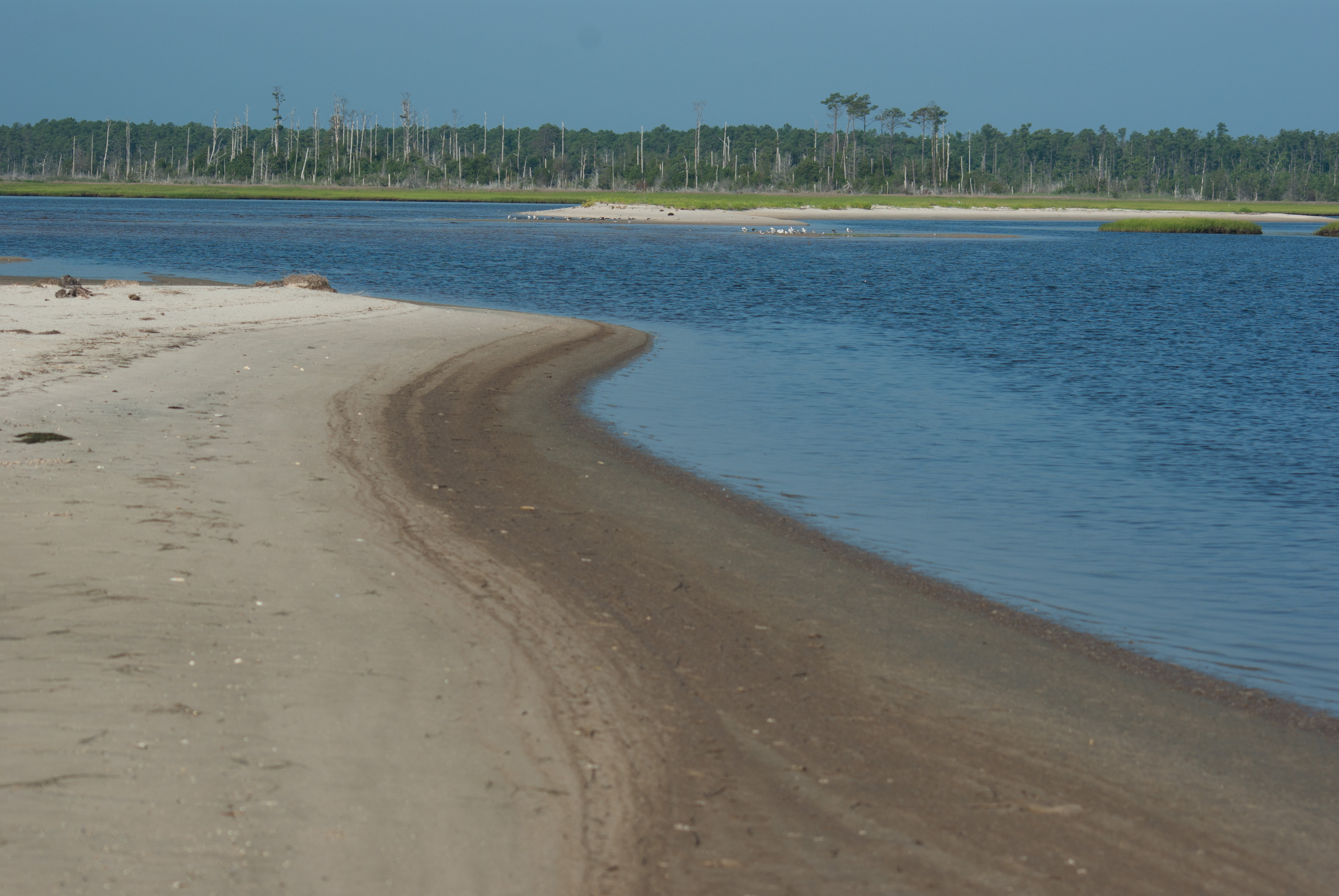
- Mud flat and forest at Bethel Beach Natural Area Preserve

- Location within Virginia Location within the United States
- Location: Mathews County, Virginia
- Coordinates: 37°24′33″N 76°15′8″W
- Area: 105 acres (42 ha)
- Governing body: Virginia Department of Conservation and Recreation

Bethel Beach Natural Area Preserve is a 105-acre (42 ha) Natural Area Preserve located in Mathews County, Virginia, near the Chesapeake Bay. It contains beach, low dune, and salt marsh habitats, and provides a haven for rare marsh and colonial nesting birds, The preserve also protects habitat for two globally rare species, the northeastern beach tiger beetle and sea-beach knotweed.

The preserve is owned and maintained by the Virginia Department of Conservation and Recreation, and is open to the public; however the preserve is largely undeveloped with the exception of a gravel parking area for visitors.

== See also ==
- List of Virginia Natural Area Preserves
- List of Virginia state forests
- List of Virginia state parks
