= Naked Mountain Natural Area Preserve =

Protected area in Virginia, US

- Location within Virginia
- Location: Nelson County, Virginia
- Coordinates: 37°45′09″N 78°49′41″W
- Area: 356 acres (1.44 km^{2})
- Established: 2006
- Owner: Private

Naked Mountain Natural Area Preserve is a 356-acre (1.44 km^{2}) Natural Area Preserve located in Nelson County, Virginia. The preserve was dedicated in 2006.

It was created to protect an uncommon growth of shooting-stars (Dodecatheon meadia) and a small population of the globally rare Torrey's mountain mint (Pycnanthemum torreyi), which occupy rocky clearings on otherwise forested slopes. The preserve includes an example of a "low-elevation basic outcrop barrens", a rare natural community that grows in dry areas with thin, basic soils and outcrops of amphibolite bedrock. The forests also represent a rare community known as "mountain/piedmont basic woodlands".

The preserve is privately owned and protected by a conservation easement held by the Virginia Department of Conservation and Recreation (DCR). It is not open to the public, although organized field trips may be arranged through the DCR and the property's private owners.

== See also ==
- List of Virginia Natural Area Preserves
