= Chub Sandhill Natural Area Preserve =

Nature preserve in Virginia, United States

- Location within Virginia Location within the United States
- Location: Sussex County, Virginia
- Nearest city: Norfolk
- Coordinates: 36°51′47″N 77°11′09″W
- Area: 1,066 acres (4.31 km^{2})
- Governing body: Virginia Department of Conservation and Recreation

Chub Sandhill Natural Area Preserve is a 1,066-acre (4.31 km^{2}) Natural Area Preserve located in Sussex County, Virginia. It contains a group of low sandhills and riparian wetlands along the Nottoway River. Much of the region's original vegetation has been lost, but the preserve supports such remnants as queen's delight, golden puccoon, and hoary scurf-pea. Sand post oak, rare in Virginia, may also be found in the woods, as may a number of native legumes.

The preserve's natural communities were historically maintained through a naturally frequent fire regime, typical of longleaf pine ecosystems that are more common to the south. To maintain the preserve's unique assemblage of species, management has incorporated regular prescribed burning since 1998. Intentional re-introduction of longleaf pine began in 2007, replacing 320 acres (1.3 km^{2}) of old fields and loblolly pine plantations. Seedlings used for reintroduction are collected from native stands at Virginia's South Quay Sandhills Natural Area Preserve.

The preserve is owned and maintained by the Virginia Department of Conservation and Recreation. Public access is permitted during daylight hours, facilitated by improvements such as a parking area, wildlife viewing platform, and trails.

== See also ==
- List of Virginia Natural Area Preserves
