= North Landing River Natural Area Preserve =

Protected area in Virginia, United States

- Location within Virginia Location within the United States
- Location: Virginia Beach, Virginia
- Coordinates: 36°38′19″N 76°04′47″W
- Area: 3,441 acres (13.93 km^{2})
- Established: 1990
- Governing body: Virginia Department of Conservation and Recreation

North Landing River Natural Area Preserve is a 3,441-acre (13.93 km^{2}) Natural Area Preserve located in Virginia Beach, Virginia, United States. It almost entirely consists of wetlands, including five wetland types considered rare in the Commonwealth of Virginia. The preserve protects pocosins, an increasingly scarce type of wetland in the southeastern United States; also in the area are a number of forested swamps and freshwater tidal marshes, all found along the lower North Landing River and supporting numerous rare species. Breeding and wintering waterfowl also make their home in the area.

North Landing River Natural Area Preserve was dedicated in 1990, and was the first Natural Area Preserve to be established in Virginia.

The preserve is owned and maintained by the Virginia Department of Conservation and Recreation. After a decade of closure due to illegal activities and lack of staff, the preserve is scheduled to re-open for public use by the end of 2026. Improvements at the preserve include a boardwalk, informational signs, a wildlife viewing platform, and a canoe/kayak launch.

== See also ==
- List of Virginia Natural Area Preserves
