= Ogdens Cave Natural Area Preserve =

Natural preserve and cave in Virginia (US)

- Location within Virginia
- Location: Frederick County, Virginia
- Coordinates: 39°02′54″N 78°19′00″W
- Area: 131 acres (53 ha)
- Governing body: Virginia Department of Conservation and Recreation

Ogdens Cave Natural Area Preserve is a 131-acre (53 ha) Natural Area Preserve located in Frederick County, Virginia, United States. The preserve protects a cave that carries a below-ground branch of Buffalo Marsh Run, which also flows overland through the preserve.

With nearly one mile (1.6 km) of the cave mapped, Ogdens Cave is the longest known cave in Frederick County. Several rare invertebrate species are found within the cave, including the thin-neck cave beetle (Pseudanophthalmus parvicollis), two amphipods, an isopod, and the Appalachian springsnail (Fontigens bottimeri). These species are sustained by nutrients delivered by the cave's stream and by various animals, such as bats and crickets, that come and go from time to time.

Above ground, the preserve covers a former farm that is reverting to a natural state. Management of the preserve includes the planting of native warm-season grasses in upland fields, and hardwood trees along Buffalo Marsh Run, to reconstruct the historic natural landscape of the area.

The preserve is owned and maintained by the Virginia Department of Conservation and Recreation. To protect the cave's delicate ecosystem, public access is not permitted. Public, guided tours of the cave have been arranged in the past.

== See also ==
- List of Virginia Natural Area Preserves
