= False Cape Natural Area Preserve =

Conservation area in Virginia, United States

- IUCN category V (protected landscape/seascape)
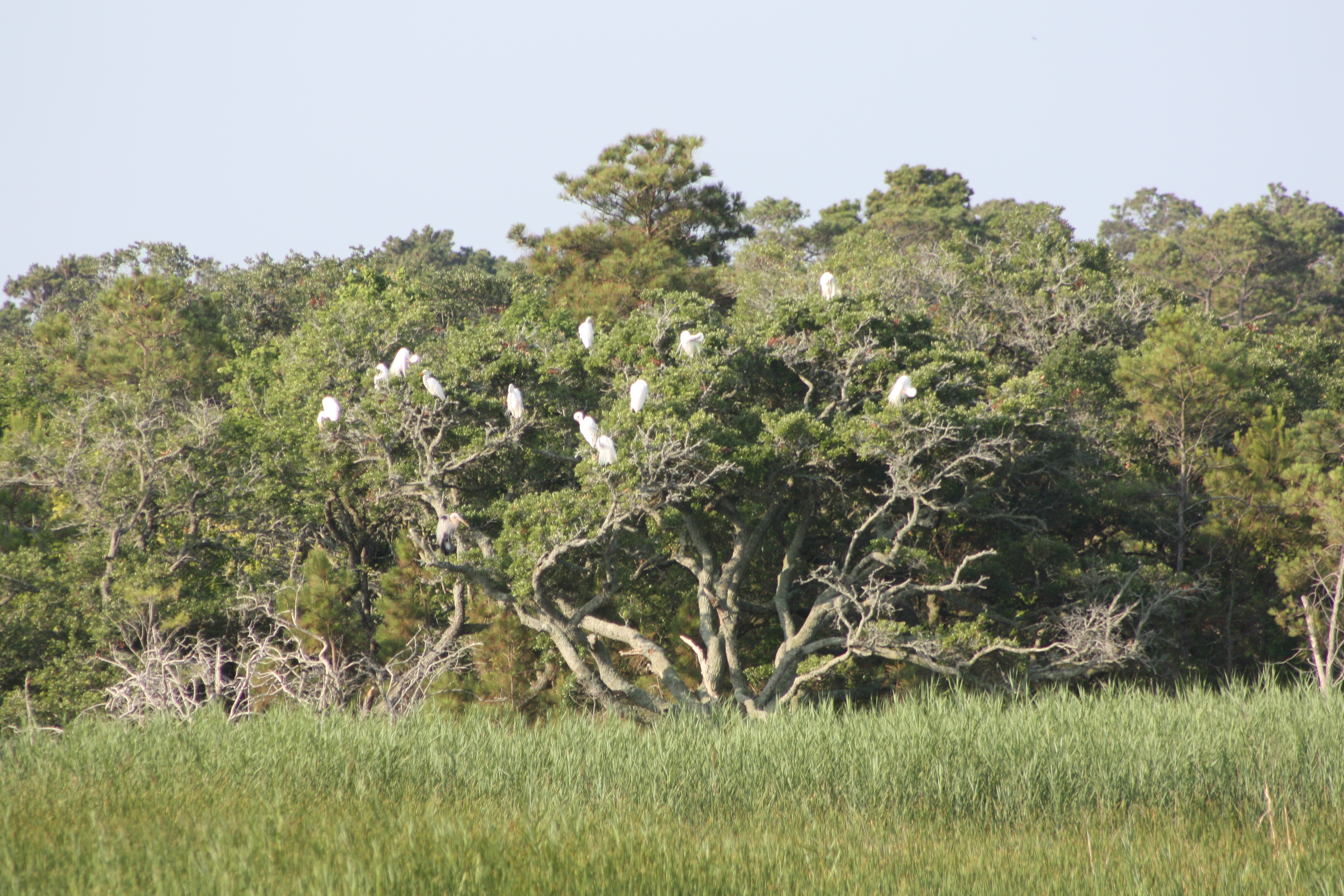
- Egrets at False Cape Natural Area Preserve

- Location within Virginia
- Location: Virginia Beach, Virginia
- Coordinates: 36°36′59″N 75°53′43″W
- Area: 3,573 acres (14.46 km^{2})
- Established: 2002
- Governing body: Virginia Department of Conservation and Recreation

False Cape Natural Area Preserve is a 3,573-acre (14.46 km^{2}) Natural Area Preserve located in Virginia Beach, Virginia, just north of the state border with North Carolina. The preserve covers a one-by-six-mile (1.6 by 9.7 km) strip of largely undeveloped land located on False Cape between the Atlantic Ocean and Back Bay, and is one of the most undisturbed areas of coastal habitat remaining in the Mid-Atlantic.

The preserve protects a variety of wetland and upland habitats, including maritime and swamp forest, interdunal wetlands, and Back Bay marshes. It also hosts various plants and animals rare in Virginia, more than two dozen in all; many of these are southern species at the northern limit of their range in far southern Virginia. Many birds also come to the area during the fall and spring migrations.

The preserve is owned and maintained by the Virginia Department of Conservation and Recreation as part of False Cape State Park, and comprises the undeveloped portions of the park; these were dedicated as a Natural Area Preserve in 2002. The preserve, like the remainder of False Cape State Park, is not publicly accessible by vehicle. The nearest parking is approximately five miles (8 km) from the preserve, which can be accessed by hiking, boating, or via a seasonal shuttle. Visitors must travel through Back Bay National Wildlife Refuge, which assesses a separate access fee.

== See also ==
- List of Virginia Natural Area Preserves
