= Bull Run Mountains Natural Area Preserve =

Nature preserve in Virginia, United States

- Location within Virginia Location within the United States
- Location: Fauquier and Prince William counties, Virginia
- Nearest city: Manassas
- Coordinates: 38°48′46″N 77°38′6″W
- Area: 2,486 acres (10.06 km^{2})
- Established: 2002
- Owner: Virginia Outdoors Foundation

Hiking Trails on Bull Run Mountains Natural Area Preserve as of 2021-05-19

Bull Run Mountains Natural Area Preserve is a 2,486-acre (10.06 km^{2}) Natural Area Preserve located along the Bull Run Mountains in Fauquier and Prince William counties, Virginia. Dedicated in 2002, the majority of the preserve is owned and operated by the Virginia Outdoors Foundation (VOF). The preserve harbors a number of outstanding natural community types, some of which are rare in the Commonwealth. There are also quartzite cliffs and boulder fields around High Point Mountain within the preserve's boundaries.

While most of the preserve is prioritized for scientific and educational activities, the Virginia Outdoors Foundation keeps 800 acres of the preserve open to the public on weekends (Friday-Sunday) for low-impact uses such as hiking and wildlife observation. On November 25, 2014, the Virginia Outdoors Foundation announced that the private landowner of the High Point Cliffs area of the preserve would close the cliffs to the public for an indefinite period of recovery and restoration, starting January 15, 2015. As of January 2025, the privately owned area is still closed to the public and there are no stated plans to re-open access.

The preserve is part of the Virginia Outdoors Foundation's Bull Run Mountains Special Project Area, which encompasses 12,800 acres (52 km^{2}).

Dogs are not allowed in the preserve.

== See also ==
- List of Virginia Natural Area Preserves
