= Blackwater River (Virginia) =

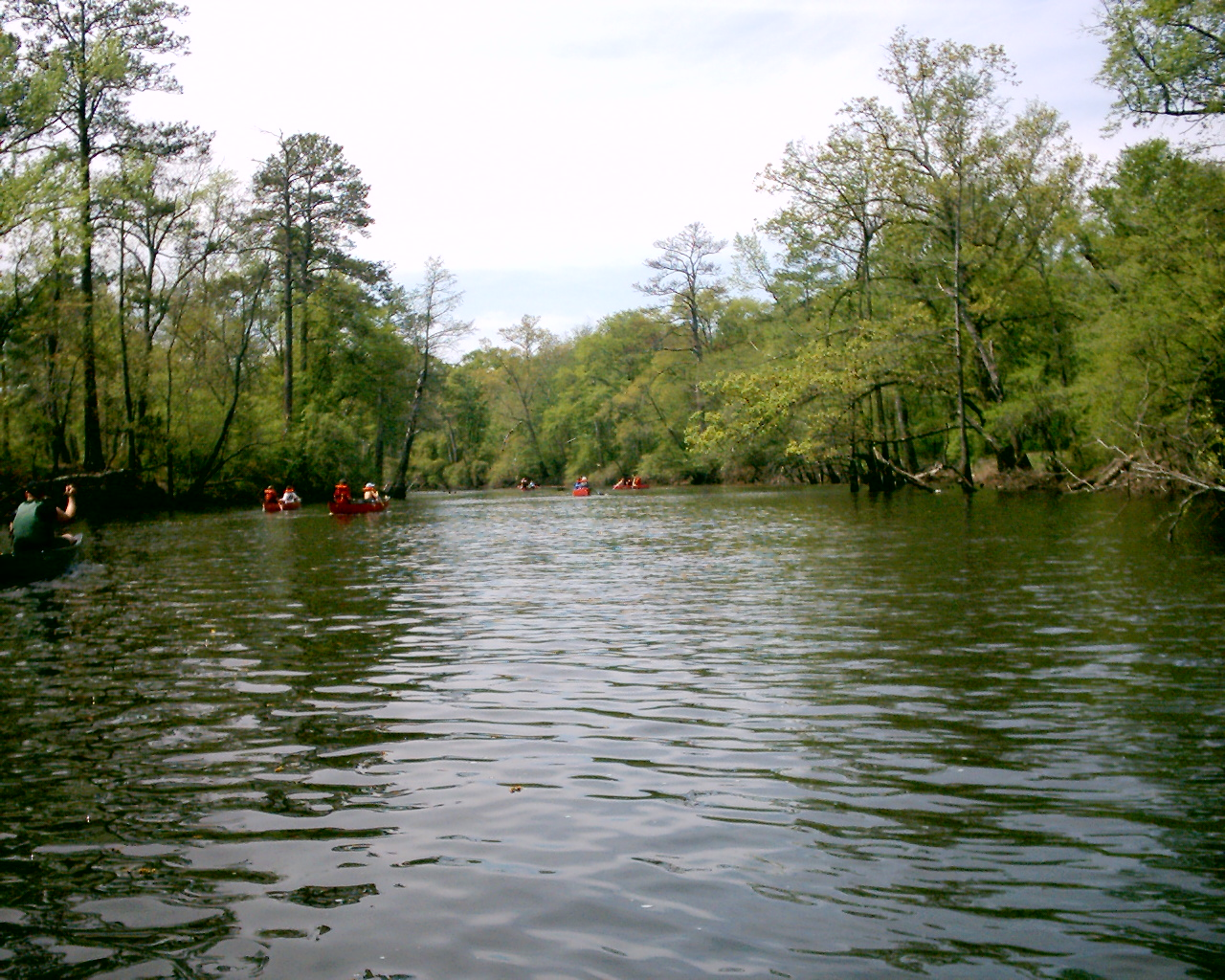

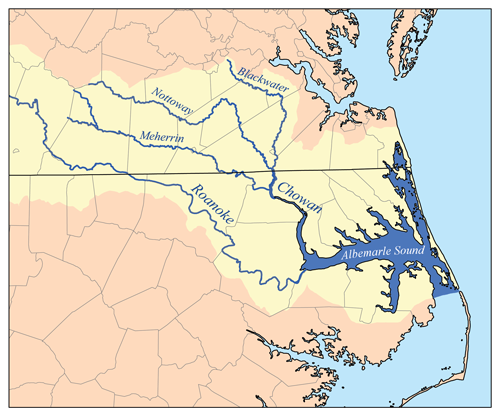
- The Blackwater River is the northernmost of the Albemarle Sound river system.

Location
- Country: United States
- State: Virginia

Physical characteristics
- Source
  - location: Prince George County
  - coordinates: 37°10′49″N 77°22′54″W
- Mouth: Chowan River
  - coordinates: 36°32′38″N 76°54′58″W

The Blackwater River of southeastern Virginia flows from its source near the city of Petersburg, Virginia for about 105 miles (169 km) through the Inner Coastal Plain region of Virginia (part of the Atlantic Coastal Plain). The Blackwater joins the Nottoway River to form the Chowan River, which empties into Albemarle Sound. The Blackwater and Nottoway river confluence is located at the border between Virginia and North Carolina.

== Overview ==
The Blackwater River is a true blackwater river. Its water is clear, dark, slightly acidic, and tannin stained. Its drainage basin contains many swamps. The river's flood plain is mostly forested and swampy, including bald cypress and tupelo swamp forests. The upper Blackwater River is called Blackwater Swamp. In this region of Virginia, many streams are called "swamps" but still function like streams in being long and linear, with water moving from one end to the other and laid out in a normal stream tributary network. In contrast, some of the region's wetlands are not streams, such as the bog-like pocosins found on the higher land between swamp-stream drainages.

The Blackwater River was a transportation route in the 17th and 18th centuries, connecting the Chesapeake Bay settlements with the Albemarle Settlements. It was one of the few rivers of colonial Virginia that did not empty into the Chesapeake Bay yet lay close to the colony's oldest settlements on the James River. Settlements in the Blackwater's drainage basin were founded very early in Virginia's history. As a result, the Blackwater River became one of the early migration routes southward from the James River into the region then called Southside Virginia, and beyond into the Albemarle District of Carolina (later North Carolina). Today's usual definition of Southside differs somewhat from that of colonial times.

== Course ==
The Blackwater River originates in several swamps within, or just south of, the city of Petersburg. It flows southeast through Prince George County, where it is called Blackwater Swamp. It then forms part of the border between Surry County and Sussex County, where its name becomes Blackwater River. It collects tributaries called Warwick Swamp, Otterdam Swamp, Coppahaunk Swamp, and Cypress Swamp. In southern Surry County, the Blackwater River turns south and forms the border between Isle of Wight County and Southampton County. It collects tributaries called Terrapin Swamp, Antioch Swamp, Seacock Swamp, Corrowaugh Swamp, and Kingsale Swamp.

The city of Franklin lies on its west bank at the river's head of navigation. While canoes and other small boats plied the Blackwater upstream of Franklin in colonial times (and still do today), in the steamboat era, navigation was restricted to the river downstream of Franklin.

South of Franklin, the Blackwater River forms the border between Southampton County and Suffolk.

About nine miles (14 km) south of Franklin, on the border between Virginia and North Carolina, the Blackwater River is joined by the Nottoway River, forming the Chowan River, which continues south to Albemarle Sound. The boundary between Virginia and North Carolina runs west from the Atlantic Ocean, striking the Blackwater River about a one-half mile (0.80 km) north of the confluence with the Nottoway River. From there the state line follows the Blackwater River south to the confluence, then continues west.

The watershed of the Blackwater River contains a portion of three cities and five counties of Virginia: the cities of Franklin, Petersburg, and Suffolk, and the counties of Isle of Wight, Prince George, Southampton, Surry, and Sussex.

== Natural history ==
The Blackwater River is, as its name implies, a blackwater river – its waters are clear, dark, acidic, low in nutrients, and tannin stained. Several environmental factors cause the blackwater condition. The many forested wetlands along the river include Streamhead Pocosins and Bald Cypress and Tupelo Swamps.

The Blackwater is known for its pocosins, including the rare type called streamhead pocosin. The only two streamhead pocosins known in Virginia are on the Blackwater River.

Bald Cypress and Tupelo Swamps occur along many streams of the Atlantic Coastal Plain. Most were logged, thus old-growth examples are rare. The Blackwater River Preserve protects one of the oldest bald cypress and tupelo swamp forests in the South, with trees up to 800 years old. The largest known water tupelo in the United States, according to the National Register of Big Trees, is in Isle of Wight County. It stands 95 feet (29 m) tall with a circumference of 406 inches (10.3 m). Another stand of old-growth bald cypress and tupelo forest, known as Dendron Swamp, was recently designated a Natural Area Preserve by the Virginia Department of Conservation of Recreation.

Another rare type of forest found along the Blackwater River is a type called longleaf pine and Mixed Pine Flatwoods. The forests were once common in southeastern Virginia, but today are restricted, in Virginia, to a few small sites on the east side of the Blackwater River. Near the town of Zuni, Virginia, one stand is protected by the Blackwater Ecological Preserve. The Red-cockaded woodpecker is endemic to the flatwoods ecosystem and the Blackwater River is the northern range of this woodpecker. Many species of reptiles and amphibians depend on the long leaf pine ecosystem. The Blackwater River is one of the few locations in Virginia that has over thirty species of amphibians.

The many old forests and wetlands along the Blackwater River have made it popular for recreational canoeing.

== Fishing ==
The Blackwater originates as a coastal plain swamp in Prince George County. It flows east through braided channels of bald cypress and tupelo in Surry County. The river then turns south into Southampton County where several boat ramps are accessible for anglers, hunters and boaters alike. The Blackwater then joins with the Nottoway to form the Chowan at the Virginia-North Carolina state line. On any one trip you can see whitetail deer, numerous waterfowl, raccoons, squirrels and many unique reptile and amphibian species, not to mention a healthy fish population swimming under the water's surface.

The dark, tannin stained waters of the Blackwater River host runs of striped bass, river herring (alewives and blueback), American and hickory shad in the spring. Angling for redbreast sunfish ("red throats" or "red robins") is also quite good in the spring. The river also hosts largemouth bass, bluegill, crappie, flier, and chain pickerel populations. Bowfin and gar are common in the lower main stem. Angling for bowfin provides a great opportunity to catch many hard-fighting fish in a short amount of time. The possibility also exists to land a trophy bowfin over ten pounds.

== Canoeing and kayaking ==
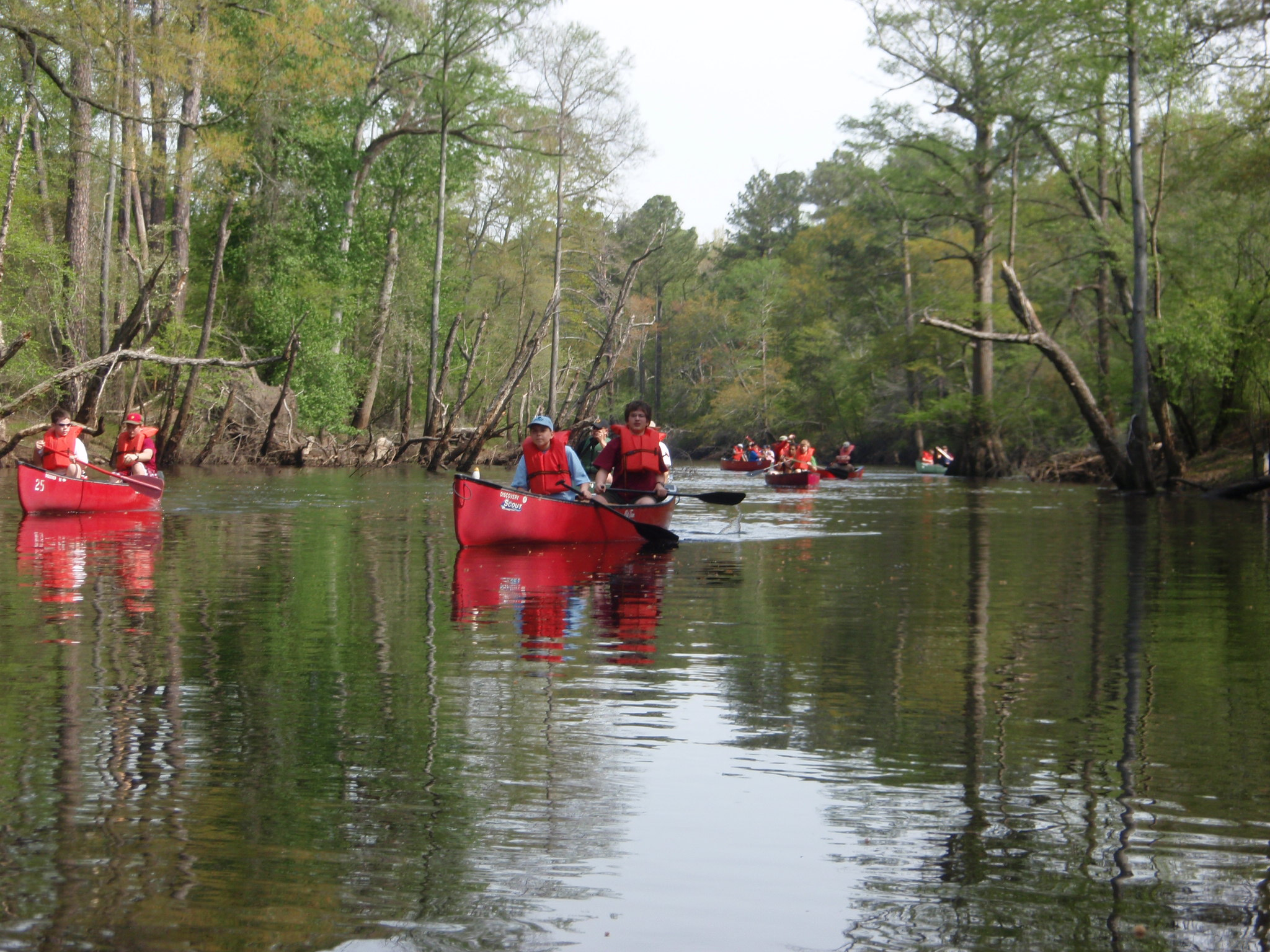
Boy Scouts canoeing on the Blackwater River, Virginia

Recreational opportunities are limited to some bridge crossings, state boat ramps, and canoe access areas. No permits are required.

Boat ramps can be found at Routes 611 (Joyner's Bridge Rd) and 603 off Route 258 in Isle of Wight County.

A new double-lane boat ramp with paved parking will be open in the City of Franklin in the spring of 2007.

Canoe access can be found off of Rt. 619 (Burdette), Rt. 189 (S. Quay), and Rt. 620 (Broadwater Br.), but beware of vehicle parking restrictions. If you are putting in at Rt. 620 speak with landowner across the street.

There is a new canoe and kayak launch now in the city of Franklin at the River Walk park next to the bridge that crosses the river from Franklin to Isle of Wight county at the mill.

== Colonial and later history ==
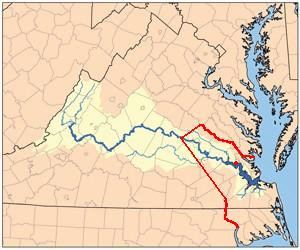
The portion of the 1646 Treaty line running from the James River southeast to "Yapim" on the Blackwater remained the legal frontier for colonists for the next 60 years.

In 1646, after two years of war between the Virginia colony and the Powhatan confederation, a peace treaty was agreed to by the leaders of the two sides (Governor William Berkeley and Chief Necotowance). The treaty set the boundary between Virginia and Indian lands at the lower Blackwater River (or Blackwater Swamp) up to its head at "Yapim" (modern Franklin), and thence in a directly straight line to the "Monacan town" (Mowhemencho, at the eastern tip of Powhatan County). Native Americans were only allowed to cross this line at the newly built Fort Henry on the Appomattox, where Petersburg now is, and they had to display a special badge, without which they could be killed on the spot, or after 1662, arrested.

By the late 17th century, some settlers from Virginia were crossing the Blackwater-Ft. Henry-Monacan town boundary, and settling in territory of Indian tribes such as the Appomattoc and the Nottoway. The government of Virginia repeatedly ordered such people to return northeast of this line, and would not allow the land beyond to be surveyed for land grants. In 1685, the House of Burgesses asked Governor Howard for permission to grant some land south of the Blackwater River. The governor denied the request.

According to a petition by the colonial government of Virginia made to the King, dated May 1, 1688, the Tributary Indians, who still legally owned the land west of the line, allegedly asked for settlers to move into their territory. The reason for the request was said to be fear of invasion by larger, non-Tributary tribes, in light of their own dwindling numbers, besides that "Such large Tracts of Land are of noe benefit nor use unto them". However, King William and Queen Mary wanted the moratorium on patents extended, and in 1691, another order was given demanding all settlers south of the river to return north. By 1706, the Blackwater boundary law was revoked and settlements south of the river or west of the line became legal.

Transportation in early colonial Virginia was usually done by water. The many wide estuaries and wetlands made land transport difficult, especially when moving goods. Migration and settlement patterns thus tended to follow the rivers, most of which flowed from the west and emptied into the Chesapeake Bay. The Blackwater River was an exception. It flowed south to Albemarle Sound. The Blackwater's headwaters were close to the main settlements along the James River (some within three miles). By the early 18th century, Virginians were living along the upper Blackwater River and using the river for travel and transportation. The political authority of Virginia was centered on the Chesapeake Bay. Most of the other rivers used for travel in Virginia at the time emptied into the bay, which helped Virginia's government control the colony's affairs. The settlers using the Blackwater River, however, were drawn away from the Chesapeake Bay to the relatively lawless settlements of Albemarle Bay. This played a role in the emerging "southside" society, as the region "south of the James River" became known. As early as 1713 a place called South Quay six and a half miles downriver from Franklin was becoming an important trade port. By 1777 South Quay was known as the leading interior port to the Tidewater area. Large warehouses were storing tobacco, pork and other goods for export and import. The South Quay venture eventually also became a shipyard and built two ships, the Caswell and the Washington, that helped defend the coast from the British fleet in 1777/78. On July 16, 1781, English Lieutenant Colonel Dundas was dispatched by Cornwallis to destroy South Quay, ending the commercial activity of what today is called Old South Quay.

During the American Civil War, the Blackwater River was for a time the dividing line between Union-occupied territory and Confederate Virginia. The boundary was not well defended, allowing thousands of "contrabands" (as the slaves were called during the war) the chance to flee east out of Southampton County, across the Blackwater River and into freedom.

== Flooding ==
Because the Blackwater River drains a large area of southern Virginia east of the Atlantic Seaboard Fall Line, when heavy rainfall occurs throughout the area, severe flooding occasionally occurs at several points as the large volume of water flows downstream. Critical points of such flooding have been near Zuni along U.S. Route 460, and in the independent city of Franklin, which borders Southampton County and Isle of Wight County. Unlike the marshy areas upstream, at these points the river's channel is limited, and flood stages can be reached very quickly. This occurred during Hurricane Floyd in 1999, and again in October 2006, after an unnamed Nor'-Easter storm dumped 10 inches (25 cm) of rain on the region.

== See also ==
- List of rivers of Virginia
