= Grafton Ponds Natural Area Preserve =

Protected nature area in Virginia, US

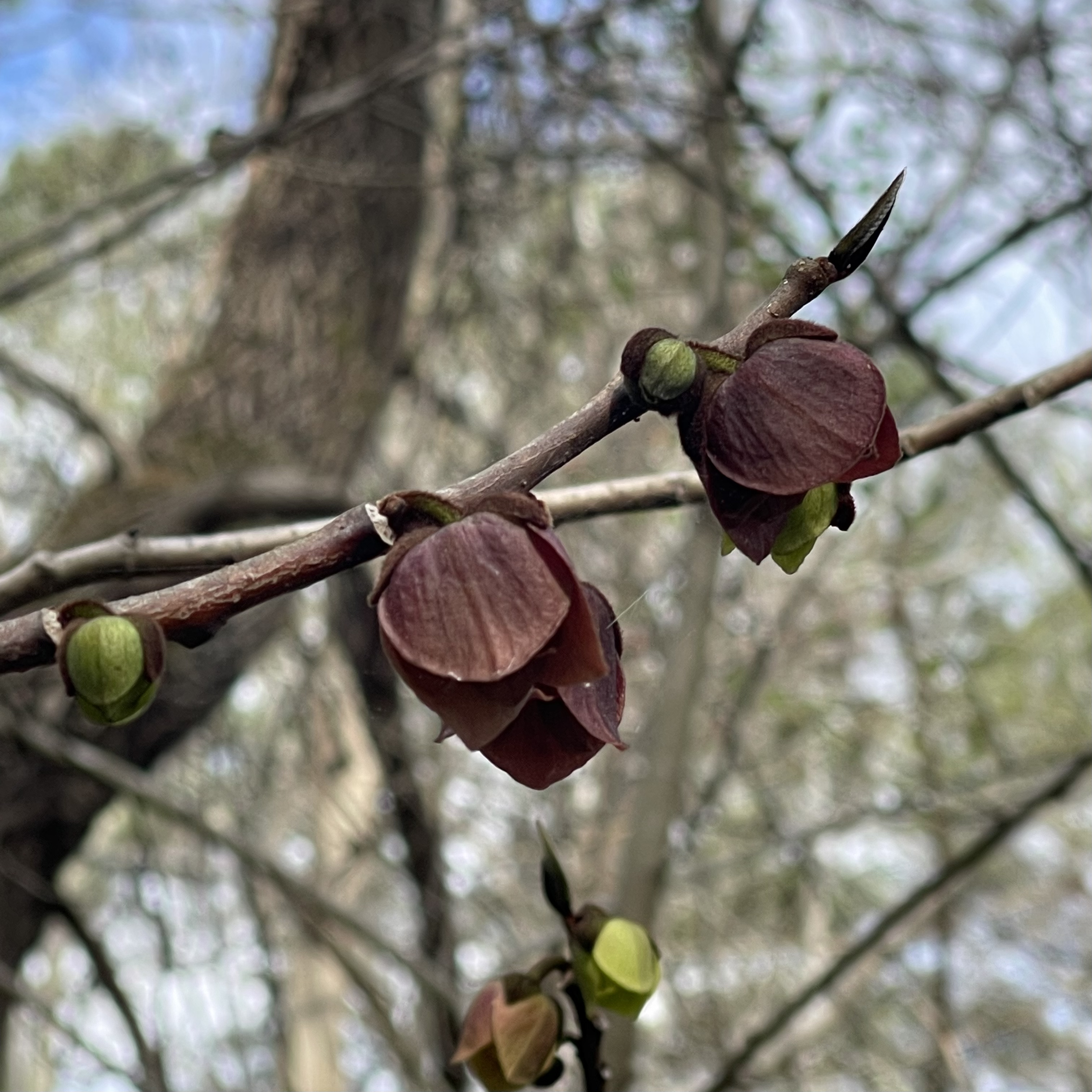
- Pawpaw blossoms as leaves emerge, in Grafton Ponds Natural Area Preserve

- Location within Virginia
- Location: York County, Virginia
- Nearest city: Newport News
- Coordinates: 37°12′0″N 76°32′15″W
- Area: 375 acres (1.52 km^{2})
- Owner: City of Newport News

Grafton Ponds Natural Area Preserve is a 375-acre (1.52 km^{2}) Natural Area Preserve located in York County, Virginia. It preserves Virginia's best remaining example of a coastal plain pond complex, and supports several locally-rare species including pond spice (Litsea aestivalis), Mabee's salamander (Ambystoma mabeei), barking treefrog (Hyla gratiosa), and the globally imperiled Harper's fimbristylis (Fimbristylis perpusilla).

The preserve is owned and maintained by the city of Newport News, and is open for public access.

== See also ==
- List of Virginia Natural Area Preserves
