= Virginia Natural Area Preserve System =

System of protected areas in Virginia

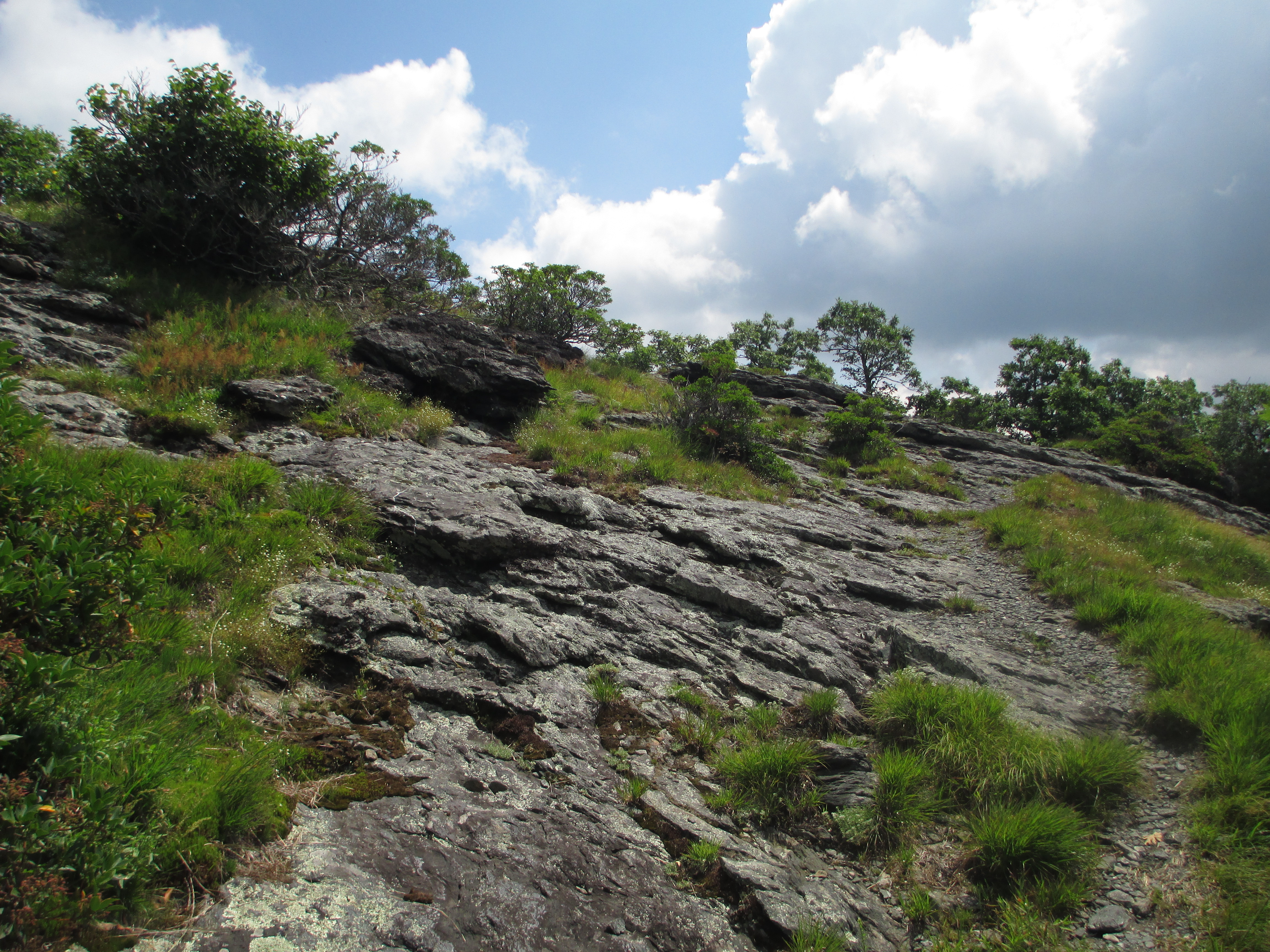
View of Buffalo Mountain's nearly treeless summit within the Buffalo Mountain Natural Area Preserve in Virginia's Floyd County

The Virginia Natural Area Preserve System is a system of protected areas in the state of Virginia. It is managed by the Virginia Department of Conservation and Recreation.

As of 2025, there are sixty-seven (67) dedicated preserves totaling 65,107 acres (263.48 km^{2}). These preserves contain examples of some of the rarest natural communities in the state; in addition, many serve as a home for locally, nationally, and globally rare species.

== History ==
In 1986, the Virginia Natural Heritage Program was formed through a cooperative agreement between the Commonwealth of Virginia and The Nature Conservancy. In 1988 the program was placed under the control of the Virginia Department of Conservation and Recreation (DCR). To further the Natural Heritage Program's mission to conserve and manage sites identified as significant natural areas within the state, The Virginia Natural Area Preserve System was established in 1989.

The system's first preserve, North Landing River Natural Area Preserve, was established in 1990. By 2007, the preserve system included 50 protected areas.

== Description ==
The Virginia Natural Area Preserve System is managed as part of the Natural Heritage Program of the Virginia Department of Conservation and Recreation, with the purpose of protecting threatened or rare plants, animals, and natural communities.

To become a part of the system, a Natural Area Preserve must be accepted by the director of the Department of Conservation and Recreation, although they may be initially dedicated by other departments and agencies of the Commonwealth of Virginia. Natural Area Preserves may be acquired by the Commonwealth of Virginia, or may continue to be owned by independent conservation organizations or other private landowners. Dedication itself is similar to a conservation easement, as it places certain legal strictures on future development of a given portion of land.

=== Access ===
Most properties are owned by the state's Department of Conservation and Recreation. However, some are owned by local governments, universities, private citizens, and independent conservation organizations, such as The Nature Conservancy.

Many state-owned properties are freely open to the public for low-impact uses, such as hiking and birdwatching. However, some state-owned properties with rare and/or species and habitats require that arrangements be made with a state-employed land steward prior to visitation.

Privately held properties may restrict public access, although sometimes it can be arranged in coordination with a preserve's owner.

Access to any individual Virginia Natural Area Preserve may be temporarily restricted or closed when it is determined as necessary to protect sensitive plant and animal populations within the preserve, for seasonal migration habitat, or for habitat management and ecological restoration activities, such as prescribed burns. Visitor impactful activities, such as camping, hunting, fishing, timber cutting, campfires, vegetation harvesting, and motorized trail vehicles are typically forbidden at all preserves.

== List of Virginia Natural Area Preserves ==
The following table lists Virginia's Natural Area Preserves as of October 2025. Those listed as being accessible "by arrangement" require prospective visitors to contact either state-employed land stewards, private property owners, or both.

Preserve name	County or counties	Area	Owner	Public access?	Notes
Antioch Pines	Isle of Wight	1,157 acres (4.68 km^{2})	DCR	By arrangement	
Bald Knob	Franklin	112 acres (0.45 km^{2})	DCR	No	
Bethel Beach	Mathews	105 acres (0.42 km^{2})	DCR	Yes	
Big Spring Bog	Grayson	50 acres (0.20 km^{2})	DCR	By arrangement	
Blackwater Ecological Preserve	Isle of Wight	319 acres (1.29 km^{2})	Old Dominion University	By arrangement	
Blackwater Sandhills	Isle of Wight	815 acres (3.30 km^{2})	Isle of Wight County	No	
Buffalo Mountain	Floyd	1,146 acres (4.64 km^{2})	DCR	Yes	
Bull Run Mountains	Fauquier, Prince William	2,486 acres (10.06 km^{2})	Virginia Outdoors Foundation	Yes	No dogs allowed on property. Highpoint Cliffs area is closed to the public.
Bush Mill Stream	Northumberland	144 acres (0.58 km^{2})	DCR	Yes	
Camp Branch Wetlands	Floyd	147 acres (0.59 km^{2})	Private	No	
Cape Charles Coastal Habitat	Northampton	50 acres (0.20 km^{2})	DCR	Yes	
Cave Hill	Augusta	89 acres (0.36 km^{2})	Madison Cave Hill LLC	No	
The Cedars	Lee	2,265 acres (9.17 km^{2})	DCR	By arrangement	
The Channels	Washington, Russell	721 acres (2.92 km^{2})	Virginia Department of Forestry	Yes	
Cherry Orchard Bog	Sussex, Prince George	354 acres (1.43 km^{2})	DCR	By arrangement	
Chestnut Creek Wetlands	Floyd	244 acres (0.99 km^{2})	DCR	By arrangement	
Chestnut Ridge	Giles, Bland	1,596 acres (6.46 km^{2})	DCR	By arrangement	
Chotank Creek	King George	1,108 acres (4.48 km^{2})	Private	No	
Chub Sandhill	Sussex	1,066 acres (4.31 km^{2})	DCR	Yes	
Cleveland Barrens	Russell	1,288 acres (5.21 km^{2})	DCR/The Nature Conservancy	By arrangement	
Clover Hollow	Giles	25 acres (0.10 km^{2})	DCR	By permission	Access permitted only for the purpose of data collection and monitoring.
Cowbane Prairie	Augusta	147 acres (0.59 km^{2})	DCR	By arrangement	
Crawford's Knob	Nelson	1,387 acres (5.61 km^{2})	Private	By arrangement	
Crow's Nest	Stafford	3,115 acres (12.61 km^{2})	Stafford County	Yes	
Cumberland Marsh	New Kent	1,095 acres (4.43 km^{2})	The Nature Conservancy	Yes	
Cypress Bridge	Southampton	553 acres (2.24 km^{2})	DCR	By arrangement	
Dameron Marsh	Northumberland	316 acres (1.28 km^{2})	DCR	Yes	
Deep Run Ponds	Rockingham	907 acres (3.67 km^{2})	DCR	By arrangement	
Dendron Swamp	Sussex	636 acres (2.57 km^{2})	DCR	By arrangement	Contains the 19-acre (7.7 ha) Charles C. Steirly Natural Area, an essentially virgin bald cypress swamp that was designated a National Natural Landmark in 1974.
Difficult Creek	Halifax	821 acres (3.32 km^{2})	DCR	Yes	
Dundas Granite Flatrock	Brunswick	11 acres (0.045 km^{2})	Private	By arrangement	
Elklick Woodlands	Fairfax	226 acres (0.91 km^{2})	Fairfax County Park Authority	By arrangement	
False Cape	Virginia Beach	3,573 acres (14.46 km^{2})	DCR	Yes	
Fletcher Ford	Lee	54.5 acres (0.221 km^{2})	The Nature Conservancy	By arrangement	
Folly Mills Creek Fen	Augusta	28 acres (0.11 km^{2})	Private	By arrangement	
Goshen Pass	Rockbridge	936 acres (3.79 km^{2})	DCR	Yes	
Grafton Ponds	York	375 acres (1.52 km^{2})	Newport News	Yes	
Grassy Hill	Franklin	1,440 acres (5.8 km^{2})	DCR	Yes	
Grayson Glades	Grayson	53 acres (0.21 km^{2})	DCR	By arrangement	
Hickory Hollow	Lancaster	254 acres (1.03 km^{2})	Northern Neck Audubon Society	Yes	
Hughlett Point	Northumberland	204 acres (0.83 km^{2})	DCR	Yes	
Johnsons Creek	Alleghany	99 acres (0.40 km^{2})	DCR	By arrangement	
Lyndhurst Ponds	Augusta	376 acres (1.52 km^{2})	DCR	By arrangement	
Magothy Bay	Northampton	445 acres (1.80 km^{2})	DCR	Yes	
Mark's and Jack's Island	Accomack	2,305 acres (9.33 km^{2})	The Nature Conservancy	By arrangement	
Mill Creek Springs	Montgomery	222 acres (0.90 km^{2})	The Nature Conservancy	By arrangement	
Mount Joy Pond	Augusta	359 acres (1.45 km^{2})	DCR	By arrangement	
Mutton Hunk Fen	Accomack	516 acres (2.09 km^{2})	DCR	Yes	
Naked Mountain	Nelson	356 acres (1.44 km^{2})	Private	By arrangement	
New Point Comfort	Mathews	105 acres (0.42 km^{2})	The Nature Conservancy	Yes	
North Landing River	Virginia Beach	3,441 acres (13.93 km^{2})	DCR	No	After a decade of closure due to illegal activities, this preserve was scheduled to re-open for public use in 2016 or 2017.
Northwest River	Chesapeake	2,788 acres (11.28 km^{2})	DCR	By arrangement	
Ogdens Cave	Frederick	131 acres (0.53 km^{2})	DCR	By arrangement	
Parkers Marsh	Accomack	759 acres (3.07 km^{2})	DCR	Yes	
Parramore Island	Accomack	7,000 acres (28 km^{2})	The Nature Conservancy	By arrangement	Access permitted for research or educational purposes only.
Pedlar Hills Glades	Montgomery	1,177 acres (4.76 km^{2})	DCR	By arrangement	
Pickett's Harbor	Northampton	125 acres (0.51 km^{2})	DCR	By arrangement	
Piney Grove Flatwoods	Sussex	446 acres (1.80 km^{2})	The Nature Conservancy	By arrangement	
Pinnacle	Russell	1,147 acres (4.64 km^{2})	DCR	Yes	
Poor Mountain	Roanoke	1,404 acres (5.68 km^{2})	DCR	Yes	
Redrock Mountain	Smyth	640 acres (2.6 km^{2})	DCR	By arrangement	
Savage Neck Dunes	Northampton	298 acres (1.21 km^{2})	DCR	Yes	
South Quay Sandhills	Southampton, City of Suffolk	3,753 acres (15.19 km^{2})	DCR/The Nature Conservancy	By arrangement	
Southside Savannah	Halifax	3,899 acres (15.78 km^{2})	DCR	By arrangement	
Sweet Springs	Montgomery	235 acres (0.95 km^{2})	Private	By arrangement	
Unthanks Cave	Lee	171 acres (0.69 km^{2})	DCR	By permission	Access permitted only for the purpose of data collection and monitoring.
Wreck Island	Northampton	1,380 acres (5.6 km^{2})	DCR	Yes	

== See also ==
- Virginia Natural Area Preserves topics
- Virginia Wildlife Management Areas
- List of Virginia state forests
- List of Virginia state parks
- Virginia Department of Conservation and Recreation topics
