= Cumberland Marsh Natural Area Preserve =

Natural Area Preserve in Virginia, US

- Location within Virginia Location within the United States
- Location: New Kent County, Virginia, US
- Nearest city: Richmond
- Coordinates: 37°33′12.5″N 76°58′51.2″W
- Area: 1,095 acres (4.43 km^{2})
- Established: 1993
- Owner: The Nature Conservancy

Cumberland Marsh Natural Area Preserve is a Natural Area Preserve located in New Kent County, Virginia, near the Cumberland Hospital Children-Adolescents. Owned by the Nature Conservancy, it preserves 1,095 acres (4.43 km^{2}) of freshwater tidal marsh along the Pamunkey River, providing habitat for bald eagles, osprey, blue herons, and egrets, as well as for the sensitive joint-vetch. It is also an important habitat for wintering waterfowl.

== See also ==
- List of Virginia Natural Area Preserves
