= Hickory Hollow Natural Area Preserve =

Protected area in Virginia, United States

- Location within Virginia
- Location: Lancaster County, Virginia
- Nearest city: Lancaster
- Coordinates: 37°46′34″N 76°26′59″W
- Area: 254 acres (1.03 km^{2})
- Established: July 12, 2000
- Owner: Northern Neck Audubon Society

Hickory Hollow Natural Area Preserve is a 254-acre (1.03 km^{2}) Natural Area Preserve located in Lancaster County, Virginia. The preserve's mixed pine-hardwood forests, ravines, and swampland form a habitat for various songbirds, wild turkeys, and a rare species of plant. The swamp is an example of a globally rare natural community known as a "coastal plain basic seepage swamp", and supports a high level of biological diversity.

Hickory Hollow Natural Area Preserve is owned by the Northern Neck Audubon Society, who purchased the land from Lancaster County in 1999. It was dedicated as a Natural Area Preserve on July 12, 2000.

The preserve is open to the public, and contains a parking area and hiking trails.

== See also ==
- List of Virginia Natural Area Preserves
