= New Point Comfort Natural Area Preserve =

Protected area in Virginia, United States

- Location within Virginia
- Location: Mathews County, Virginia
- Coordinates: 37°19′9″N 76°16′53″W
- Area: 105 acres (42 ha)
- Owner: The Nature Conservancy

New Point Comfort Natural Area Preserve is a 105-acre (42 ha) Natural Area Preserve located in Mathews County, Virginia. The point is situated on the Chesapeake Bay along the Atlantic Flyway, and consequently provides habitat for nesting and breeding birds, both during the migration season and at other times throughout the year; among the birds that may be found there is the rare least tern. The northeastern beach tiger beetle, listed as threatened in the United States, also makes its home in portions of the preserve.

New Point Comfort Natural Area Preserve is owned and maintained by The Nature Conservancy, and is open to the public. Improvements at the preserve include a short boardwalk and overlook within the marsh, and a nature trail through the forest.

== See also ==
- List of Virginia Natural Area Preserves
