= Camp Branch Wetlands Natural Area Preserve =

Nature preserve in Virginia, US

- Location within Virginia
- Location: Floyd County, Virginia
- Coordinates: 36°52′57″N 80°31′50″W
- Area: 147 acres (59 ha)
- Established: 2007
- Owner: Private

Camp Branch Wetlands Natural Area Preserve is an 147-acre (59 ha) Natural Area Preserve located in Floyd County, Virginia. Privately owned, it was officially dedicated in 2007, and is part of a larger private holding of 188 acres (76 ha) protected by a conservation easement held by the Virginia Outdoors Foundation. The preserve is closed to the public.

== See also ==
- List of Virginia Natural Area Preserves
