= Blackwater Ecological Preserve =

Nature preserve in Virginia, US

- Location within Virginia
- Location: Isle of Wight County, Virginia
- Coordinates: 36°48′53″N 76°51′8″W
- Area: 319 acres (129 ha)
- Owner: Old Dominion University

The Blackwater Ecological Preserve is a 319-acre (129 ha) Natural Area Preserve located in the area of Zuni, Virginia and owned by Old Dominion University. It is home to flatwoods of longleaf pine and turkey oak and savannas of longleaf pine, two of the rarest plant communities in Virginia. The longleaf pine savanna is the northernmost natural occurrence of such a plant community in the United States. Research on longleaf pine survival rates are currently being performed by Old Dominion University.

The preserve is open to public visitation only through prior arrangement with Old Dominion University.

== See also ==
- List of Virginia Natural Area Preserves
