= Elklick Woodlands Natural Area Preserve =

Protected area in Virginia, US

- IUCN category V (protected landscape/seascape)
- Location within Northern Virginia Location within Virginia Location within the United States
- Location: Fairfax County, Virginia
- Coordinates: 38°51′33″N 77°29′50″W
- Area: 226 acres (91 ha)
- Governing body: Fairfax County Park Authority

Elklick Woodlands Natural Area Preserve is a 226-acre (91 ha) Natural Area Preserve located in Fairfax County, Virginia. Owned by the Fairfax County Park Authority, it is protected with a local conservation easement, and preserves a globally rare natural community known as a "northern hardpan basic oak-hickory forest". This kind of forest occurs on diabase soil with an underlay of dense plastic clay; such terrain is called "shrink-swell soil" due to extreme variations in moisture availability exhibited throughout the year. Trees which grow in such an environment are stunted, and their relatively open canopies encourage the growth of a wide variety of grasses and herbs in the understory. Such forests were once common around northern Virginia, but many have been lost due to increasing suburbanization of the area.

The forest found within Elklick Woodlands Natural Area Preserve is one of the most diverse upland forests types in Virginia. The forest's overstory is composed of several species of oaks (particularly white oak) and hickories (particularly pignut hickory); other canopy trees include white ash, tulip poplar, eastern red cedar, and Virginia pine. These trees are somewhat stunted and reach heights that are, on average, about 20 feet (6.1 m) shorter than typical forest trees in the region. The understory contains redbud, ironwood, flowering dogwood, and hawthorn.

The preserve is owned and maintained by the Fairfax County Park Authority. It does not include improvements for public access, and visitors must make arrangements with the Fairfax County Park Authority prior to visiting. The preserve is part of a larger tract of county-owned parkland known as the Elklick Preserve. It is continuous with other county-owned and privately conserved greenspace, as well as the nearby Manassas National Battlefield Park.

== See also ==
- List of Virginia Natural Area Preserves
