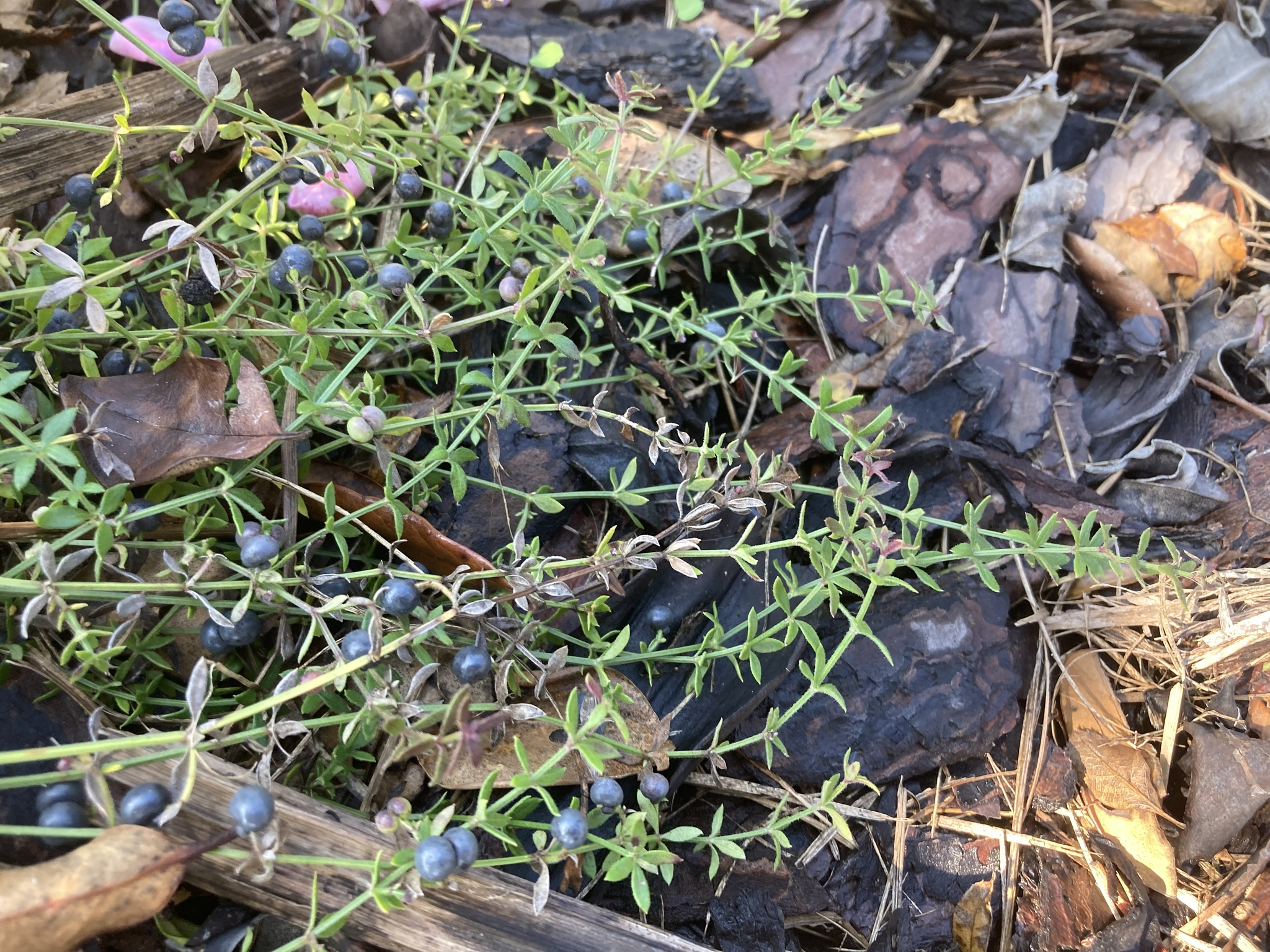

Scientific classification
- Kingdom: Plantae
- Clade: Tracheophytes
- Clade: Angiosperms
- Clade: Eudicots
- Clade: Asterids
- Order: Gentianales
- Family: Rubiaceae
- Genus: Galium
- Species: G. bermudense

Binomial name
- Galium bermudense L.

Synonyms
- List: Galium rotundifolium var. bermudense (L.) Kuntze; Relbunium bermudense (L.) Britten; Rubia peregrina Walter sensu auct.; Galium hispidulum Michx.; Rubia brownei Michx.; Rubia rotundifolia Poir. in J.B.A.M.de Lamarck; Galium hispidum Pursh; Galium carolinianum F.Dietr; Rubia techensis Raf.; Rubia walteri DC; Galium peregrinum Britton; Bataprine hispidula (Michx.) Nieuwl.

= Galium bermudense =

Bermuda bedstraw

Species of plant

Galium bermudense, commonly known as Bermuda bedstraw, is a species of plant in the family Rubiaceae. It is native to Bermuda, the Bahamas, and the south-eastern United States (all the coastal states from Texas to New Jersey).

It has been observed growing in habitat types such as dry sandy forests, sandhills, maritime forests, and longleaf pine systems.
