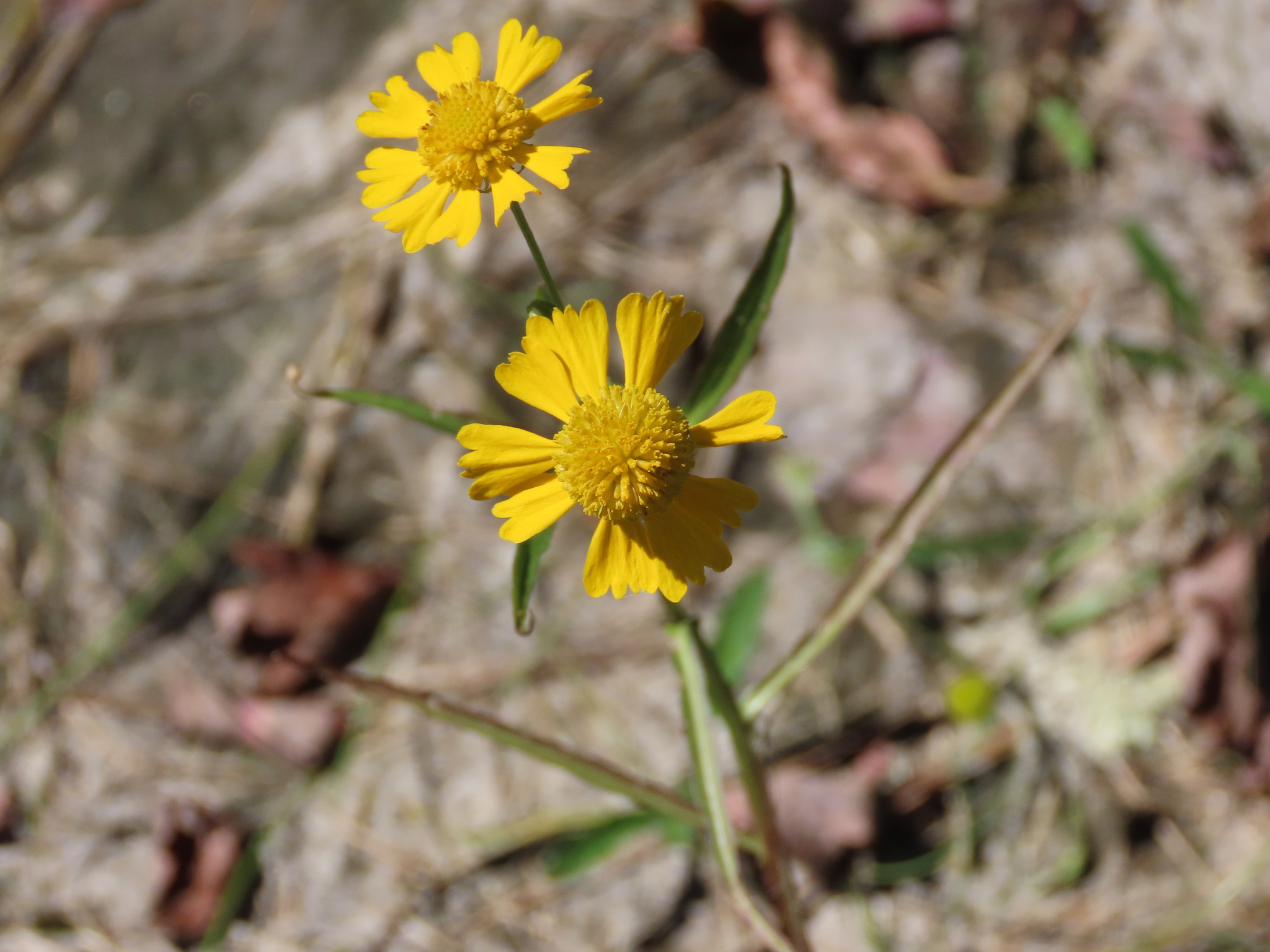

Conservation status
- Vulnerable (NatureServe)

Scientific classification
- Kingdom: Plantae
- Clade: Tracheophytes
- Clade: Angiosperms
- Clade: Eudicots
- Clade: Asterids
- Order: Asterales
- Family: Asteraceae
- Genus: Helenium
- Species: H. virginicum

Binomial name
- Helenium virginicum S.F.Blake

= Helenium virginicum =

Species of flowering plant

Helenium virginicum is a rare species of flowering plant in the aster family known by the common name Virginia sneezeweed. It occurs in the United States, where it has a disjunct distribution; it is known only from Virginia and Missouri. It is limited to a specific type of habitat and it is threatened by modification of this habitat. It was federally listed as a threatened species of the United States in 1998.

At the time the plant received federal protection it was known from 28 populations in two Virginia counties. Soon after, a population of similar plants was found in Missouri and by genetic analysis were confirmed to be of the same species. Searches turned up a total of 44 occurrences in six counties in the Ozark Highlands of Missouri. This disjunct distribution was probably caused by the cleaving of the species' geographical range during Pleistocene glaciation, leaving two relict ranges.

Helenium virginicumis similar to and often mistaken for Helenium autumnale, the common sneezeweed. It is a perennial herb generally growing to a maximum height between 70 centimeters and 1.1 meters (28-44 inches), but it is known to reach 1.7 meters (68 inches or 5 2/3 feet) at times. There is a basal rosette of leaves and an erect, winged stem lined with lance-shaped leaves that become smaller toward the top of the stem. The inflorescence has several flower heads, each with a spherical disc covered with disc florets and lined with yellow ray florets just over a centimeter (0.4 inches) long. Blooming occurs in July through October. The plant is self-incompatible.

Helenium virginicum only grows near sinkhole ponds in the Ozark Highlands of Missouri and the western margin of the Blue Ridge Mountains in Virginia. These ponds are lined with clay or bedrock and are filled with water from about January to June or July each year. They may take the form of actual holes or they may be more like very wet meadows. The ponds are often actively grazed by cattle and can tolerate disturbance. The hydrology of the sinkholes varies seasonally and year to year, causing a similar fluctuation in the population and recruitment of the sneezeweed.

The greatest threat to this species is habitat modification. Destruction of the sinkhole habitat could lead to the extinction of the species.
