= Zuni, Virginia =

Unincorporated community in Virginia, United States

- Unincorporated community
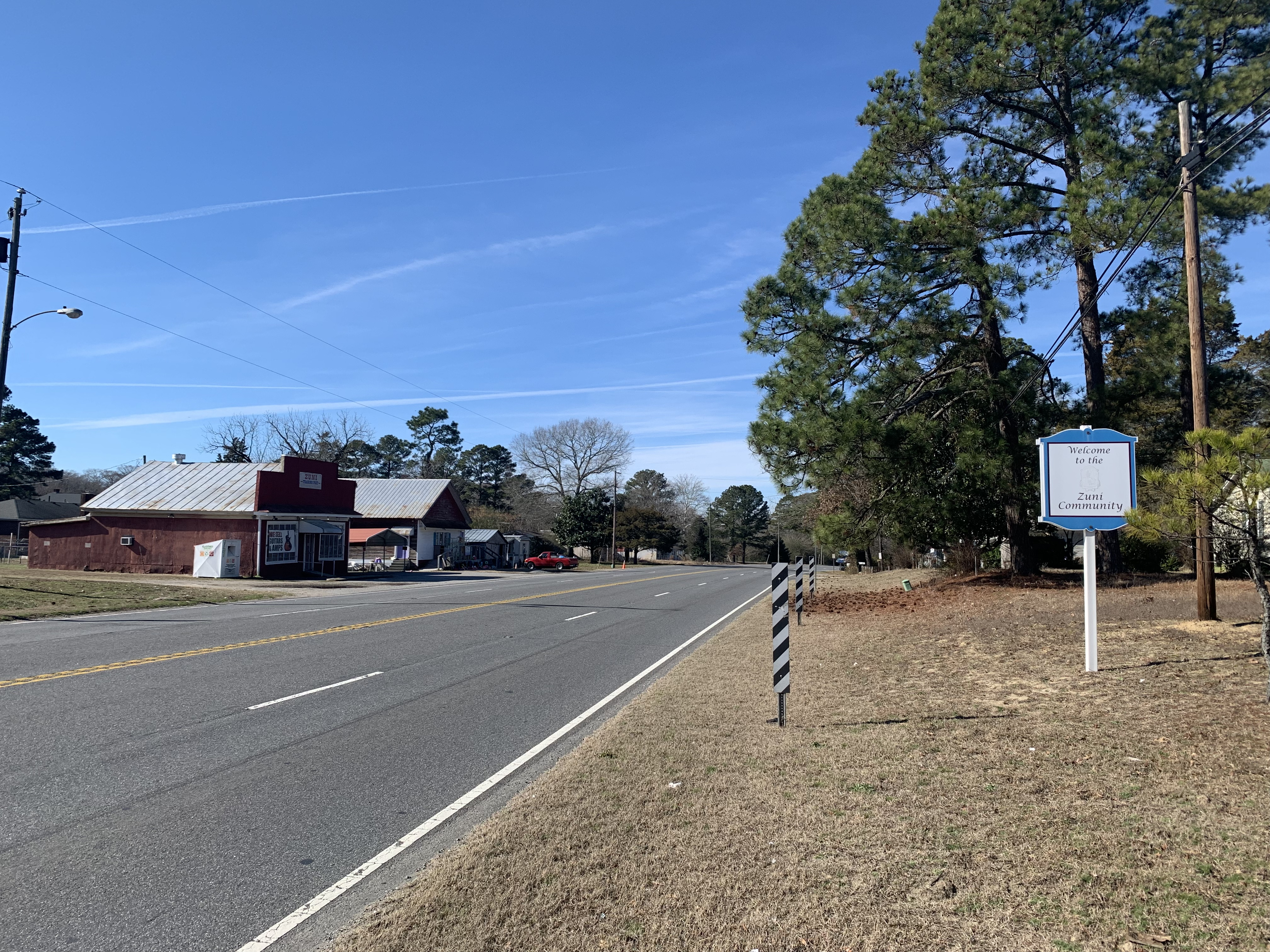
- Zuni in 2022, along US Route 460

- Location within Virginia Location within the United States
- Coordinates: 36°51′58″N 76°49′51″W
- Country: United States
- State: Virginia
- County: Isle of Wight
- Elevation: 745 ft (227 m)
- Time zone: UTC−5 (Eastern (EST))
  - Summer (DST): UTC−4 (EDT)
- ZIP codes: 23898
- GNIS ID: 1500086

Zuni (/ˈzuːnaɪ/) is an unincorporated community in Isle of Wight County in the Hampton Roads region of southeastern Virginia, United States. It also gives its name to the 1000 acre Zuni Pine Preserve, with its associated Antioch Pines Natural Area Preserve operated by the Virginia Department of Conservation and Natural Resources (DCR) and Blackwater Ecological Preserve operated by Old Dominion University in conjunction with the DCR.

Zuni sits on the banks of the Blackwater River, which separates Isle of Wight County and Southampton County. In addition to a post office, Zuni has a general store, gas station, small engine repair shop and two churches. In the mid-20th century Zuni also had hotels, a bank and other businesses, but suffered severe storm damage during Hurricane Floyd in 1999 and the Blackwater River flooded again in 2006.

== Geography ==
Zuni is on U.S. Route 460, southeast of Ivor and northwest of Windsor. Zuni is the closest community to Virginia's only naturist facility, known as White Tail Resort, which is technically within Ivor.

== Literature ==
Zuni, Virginia appears as a location in the dystopian novel Asphalt by Carl Hancock Rux.
