= Chestnut Creek =

Coordinates: 36°45′31.45″N 80°57′19.29″W

Location
- Country: United States

Physical characteristics
- Source
  - location: Virginia

Chestnut Creek is a river in the state of Virginia.

== See also ==
- List of rivers of Virginia
