= Hardings, Virginia =

Unincorporated community in Virginia, US

Coordinates: 37°44′55″N 76°19′47″W

Hardings is an unincorporated community in Northumberland County, in the U.S. state of Virginia.
