= Virginia Department of Conservation and Recreation =

Agency overview
- Jurisdiction: Government of Virginia
- Headquarters: 600 East Main Street, 24th Floor, Richmond, Virginia 23219; 37.54003°N 77.43899°W
- Minister responsible: David L. Bulova, Secretary of Natural Resources
- Agency executive: Nikki Rovner, Director
- Website: www.dcr.virginia.gov

The Virginia Department of Conservation and Recreation is a department of the government of Virginia, United States; it oversees all Virginia state parks and Natural Area Preserves.

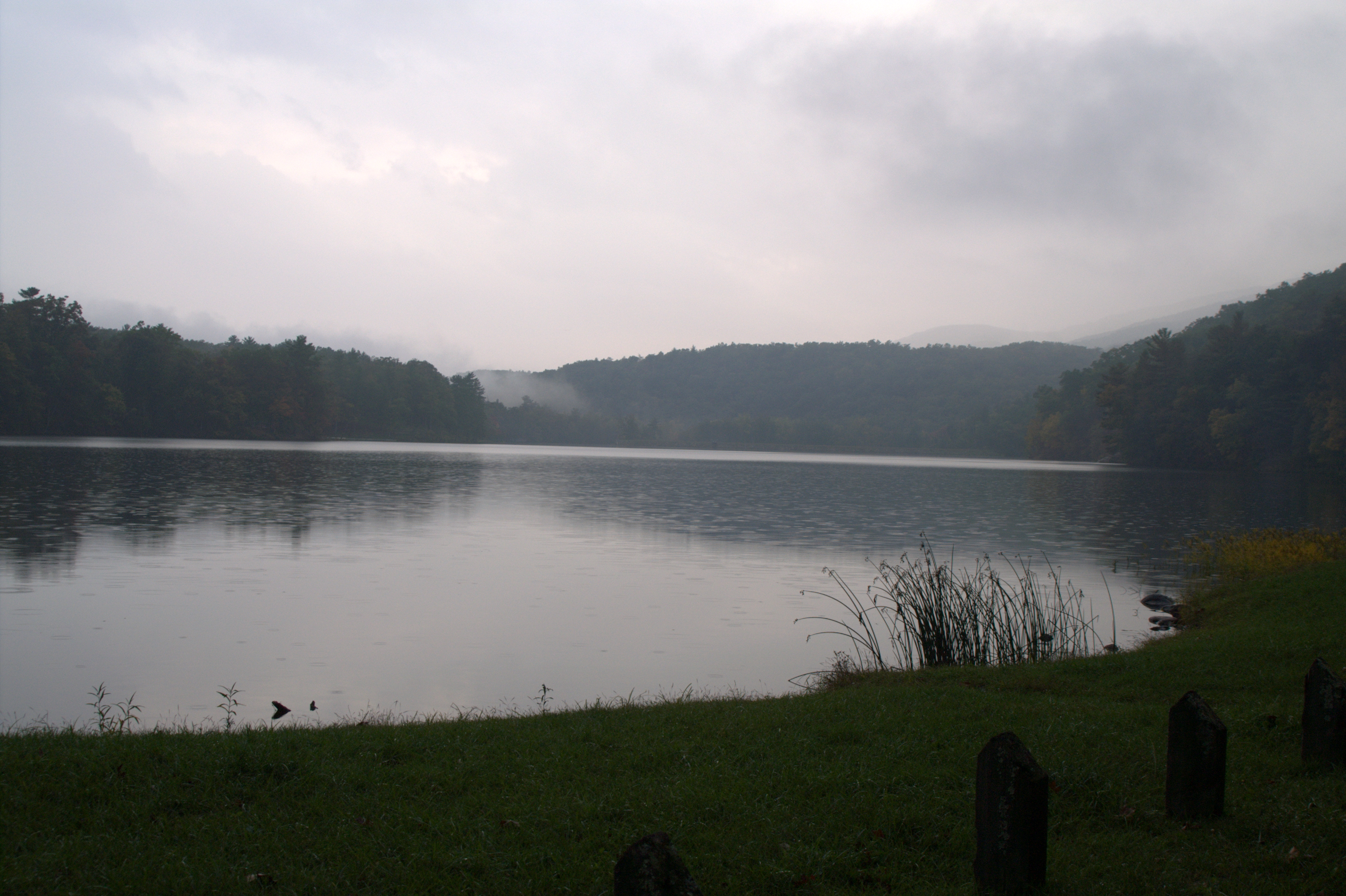
Douthat Lake at Douthat State Park, one of the original Virginia state parks built by the Civilian Conservation Corps.

== History ==
The Virginia State Commission of Conservation and Development was created in 1926 under Governor Harry F. Byrd to consolidate and coordinate several conservation agencies: the Water Power and Development Commission, the State Geological Commission, the State Geological Survey, Office of the State Geologist, Office of the State Forester, and the Division of Parks. William E. Carson (1870–1942) was the commission's first (unpaid) chairman and served until resigning pending a reorganization that became effective in late December 1934 and which authorized a full-time state employee to head the agency. Carson consolidated what under his successor Wilbur C. Hall (1935–1939), became Shenandoah National Park, as well as coordinated with the federal Department of the Interior and Civilian Conservation Corps (CCC), which created a $5 million system of state parks (in exchange for Virginia appropriations of $100,000 which some called "the biggest bargain of the New Deal"). Also during Carson's chairmanship, Governor John Garland Pollard in 1932 accepted several land parcels in and surrounding Richmond, Virginia, which in March 1936 became Richmond National Battlefield Park after being given to the National Park Service because during the Great Depression the Commonwealth lacked funds to develop and maintain those lands and structures. Carson also created a Division of History and Archaeology within the State Commission of Conservation and Development and started a historical marker program.

Virginia's first six state parks were created in June 1936 despite the opposition of Virginia's senators Carter Glass and Harry F. Byrd to many other aspects of President Franklin Delano Roosevelt's administration. The first state parks were: Westmoreland State Park, Seashore State Park (which later became First Landing State Park), Fairy Stone State Park, Staunton River State Park, Douthat State Park and Hungry Mother State Park. CCC labor also built Prince William Recreational Development Area (now Prince William Forest Park operated by the National Park Service) and Swift Run Recreational Demonstration Areas (now Pocahontas State Park) as group camping areas, which were later converted into parks. In these and other projects, the CCC employed 107,210 in Virginia at one time or another, including 64,762 young Virginians who planted 15.2 million trees, built 986 bridges, reduced fire hazards over 152,000 acres, strung 2,128 miles of telephone line and stocked 1.3 million fish. Virginia received the fifth largest state expenditure in the country, totaling $109 million during the agency's nine-year existence.

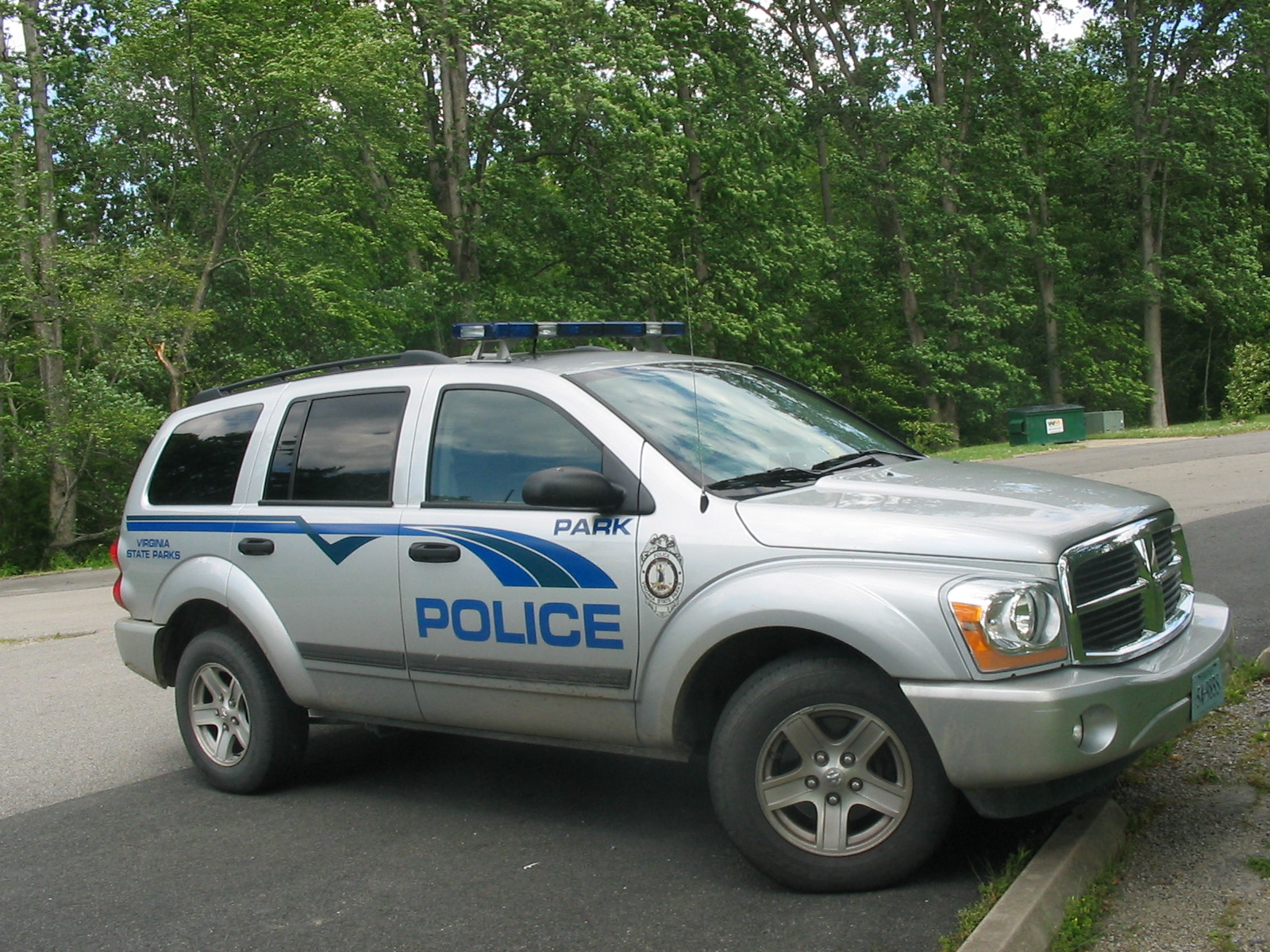
A Virginia State Parks Police vehicle at Mason Neck State Park

The agency's name changed in 1938 to the Virginia Conservation Commission, which was led by N. Clarence Smith (1939–1942), and William A. Wright (1942–1948). In 1948 the Virginia General Assembly again reorganized state government and created the Department of Conservation and Development, which consolidated the functions of the Conservation Commission, State Port Authority and the State Planning Board. Governor William Tuck named Wright as director of the new Department of Conservation and Development. In 1985, another major governmental reorganization created the current Virginia Department of Conservation and Recreation.
