= William E. Carson (conservationist) =

Virginia conservationist and businessman

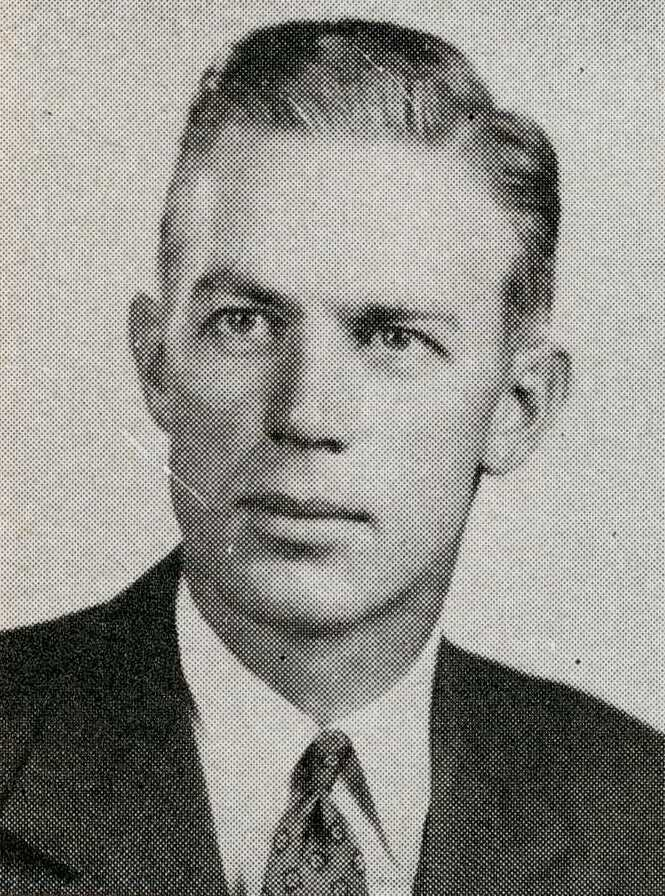

1st Chair of the Virginia Conservation and Development Commission
- In office 1925 – December 31, 1934
- Governor: Harry Byrd; John Garland Pollard; George Peery
- Preceded by: position created
- Succeeded by: position reorganized

Personal details
- Born: October 8, 1870 Enniskillen, Ireland
- Died: March 25, 1942 (aged 71) Killahevlin, Front Royal, Warren County, Virginia, U.S.
- Spouse: Agnes Holladay McCarthy
- Children: 3 (incl. 2 daughters who survived him)
- Parent(s): Samuel Carson and Anne Lougheed Carson
- Occupation: Businessman and conservationist

William Edward (Will) Carson (October 8, 1870 – March 25, 1942) was an Irish immigrant who became a prominent Virginia businessman, conservationist and author. As the (unpaid) chairman of the Virginia State Commission on Conservation and Development (a predecessor of the Virginia Department of Conservation and Recreation) for about a decade, he worked to foster a tourist economy by initiating Virginia's model historical marker program, as well as by securing land, funding and Civilian Conservation Corps workers; these actions laid the groundwork for state and federal parks in Virginia. Carson served under three Virginia Governors and two U.S. Presidents, but due to political exigencies within the Byrd Organization, he only spoke at the Virginia and national sesquicentennial celebrations and the dedications of Skyline Drive and Colonial National Monument (which became Colonial National Historical Park). The Virginia General Assembly reorganized the agency in early November 1934, requiring a full-time leader, but failing to appropriate a salary, prompting Carson to resign effective January 1, 1935. Thus, although considered one of the founders of Shenandoah National Park, as well as the Virginia state park system, Carson was not publicly acknowledged at those dedications on June 15 and July 3, 1936. He and his wife also donated 63 acres of land which is still a public golf course and park in Front Royal, Virginia, and their former home in Front Royal, Killahevlin, is listed on the National Register for Historic Places.

== Early life and education ==
Born in Enniskillen in what became Northern Ireland to the former Anne Lougheed and her husband Samuel Carson. Carson had three brothers, including: Adam C. Carson (1868-1941), Charles W. Carson of Woodstock and Dr. Samuel W. Carson (d. 1935). In 1885 the brothers arrived in Norfolk (in the state's southeast corner) following their father, who found business opportunities in opposite corners of the Commonwealth. In 1870, his father had bought land in Warren County (in the state's northwest corner). Relations between this family and another Carson family which included a never-married man also named William Carson who had served in the House of Delegates from Shenandoah County around the War of 1812 and helped found Warren County are unknown. In any event, this Will Carson was educated in Ireland, and began working at his father's lime plant in Virginia in 1888. In 1891, Samuel Carson (Sr.) received a state charter for the Carson Lime Company (which this man ultimately reincorporated as the Riverton Lime Corporation in 1904). Meanwhile this Will Carson received an education in Ireland, then lived with his father and stepmother (Sarah H. Carson) until 1905 at the family home named "Delbrook" in Riverton, until Killahevlin (an elaborate house in the Queen Anne style which he commissioned in connection with his upcoming marriage) was finished. He welcomed his nieces Isabella McNeil Carson and Annie Lougheed Carson from Ireland to his Riverton home in 1908.

== Personal life ==
Carson married Agnes Holladay McCarthy at the Seventh Street Christian Church in Richmond on May 9, 1906. Her father, William H. McCarthy (1842–1919), a leading fire and marine insurance executive in Richmond, was descended from an early 19th century Irish immigrant merchant named Florence McCarthy (1798–1864), and his gravestone notes his service as a Confederate States Army artilleryman throughout the Civil War and surrender with CSA General R.E. Lee at Appomattox. Her middle name reflected her mother, Louisa Holladay McCarthy (1845–1922). Several maternal ancestors (surname spellings varying in that era) had served in the Virginia General Assembly since burgess Anthony Holliday represented Isle of Wight County for multiple terms beginning in 1693, and Anthony Holladay represented neighboring Nansemond County in 1752–1755. Her grandfather had been named to honor Waller Holliday who represented Spotsylvania County, Virginia beginning in 1819, and a probably never-married relative named Waller Holladay served in the state Senate during this man's career, retiring in 1931.

The Carson-McCarthy wedding attracted political and social elite from various areas within the Commonwealth. Carson's best man was Winchester attorney Richard Evelyn Byrd (1860–1925), his brother's law partner as well as a member of the Virginia House of Delegates who two years later became that body's Speaker. Congressman Henry D. Flood was a groomsman. The couple had a son, William E. Carson Jr (1909-1925 who died of influenza) and two daughters (Louisa and Virginia) who married and survived their parents.

== Career ==
=== Businessman ===
In addition to operating the Riverton Lime Company (which in 1935 became Riverton Lime and Stone), in 1908 Carson became chairman of the board of directors of the National Lime Manufacturers Association (which merged late in 1918 with the Hydrated Lime Bureau and became the National Lime Association). Despite unsuccessfully lobbying against future Virginia Governor Westmoreland Davis' second attempt to establish two additional lime grinding plants in 1912, Carson served as the national association's president in 1919. In August 1936, during Carson's tour of the lime and cement plants of England, Germany, France and Switzerland, the British Scientific and Industrial Research Society elected him a fellow, recognizing his contributions to ceramics, lime and mortar technology.

=== Politician ===
Although his father was a Republican, Carson and his brother A.C. Carson became active in the local Democratic Party. A.C. Carson (sometimes nicknamed "Kit" or with the "Judge" honorific) graduated from the University of Virginia School of Law and in 1893 began reading law with Richard Evelyn Byrd Sr. and by 1902 served in the Philippines with Byrd's son the future explorer Richard E. Byrd, and secured an appointment as a territorial judge in 1904 thru the support of Republican President William Howard Taft and Democratic congressman Henry D. Flood. Will Carson chaired the Seventh District Democratic Committee for three decades (from 1910 until 1940). Although considered for several other posts, Carson was appointed by Governor E. Lee Trinkle to the Hampton Roads Port Commission (on the opposite end of the state) in 1923, and served until his State Commission on Conservation and Development appointment in 1926 discussed below. Meanwhile, in 1925, Carson ran the successful gubernatorial campaign of Harry Flood Byrd.

=== State Commission on Conservation and Development ===
Shortly after taking office on January 1, 1926, Governor Byrd received legislative approval and created the State Commission on Conservation and Development in March 1926 (consolidating the Water Power and Development Commission with the geological and forestry offices). Carson became the new agency's first Chairman, for which he received no pay. The vice-chairman was Richmond stockbroker Coleman Wortham, and other members included bankers E. Griffith Dodson of Norfolk and Thomas L. Farrar of Charlottesville, newspaperman Junius P. Fishburn of Roanoke, Rufus G. Roberts of Culpeper and Lee Long of Dante in far southwest Virginia.

By 1927, Carson and his assistant H.J. Eckenrode initiated a historical highway marker program. Governor Byrd later said he and Carson had been inspired during a campaign stop by a sign at the Cuckoo Tavern in Louisa County marking Jack Jouett's ride during the Revolutionary War. By 1931, the VDC had erected more than a thousand historical markers, and became a model for other states.

Traveling across Virginia as well as taping radio addresses, Carson advocated for the creation of both federal and state parks, to spur tourism from its historic and natural resources, thus creating jobs as well. Governor Byrd envisioned development that would attract industry and benefit the state, while Carson believed Virginia's natural and historic resources would lure both tourists and businesses. Carson envisioned parks in all the state's regions, from its historic Tidewater region to Shenandoah National Park in the Appalachian mountains. VDC crews also restored George Washington's mill near Mount Vernon, and Wakefield. Initially, the VDC (as well as government entities from West Virginia, Kentucky, Tennessee and Arkansas) also opposed Appalachian Power Company's proposed damming of the New River in Pulaski County near Radford, and so joined in a lawsuit against the Federal Power Commission, arguing that the private entity was usurping governmental powers, and that the federal commission was usurping state's rights. However, that project was ultimately completed, and became Claytor Lake State Park in 1939.

==== Federal parks ====
Creation of a national park on the East Coast had been advocated since 1911 or earlier, with various local politicians in various areas of the Commonwealth. Although sites in Virginia's Historic Triangle would first be consolidated with federal imprimatur early in Carson's tenure with the Conservation and Development, his major effort would prove closer to his home, with creation of Shenandoah National Park shortly after his tenure ended. In 1928 (a federal but not state election year), the Democratic controlled Virginia legislature passed a mass condemnation act (drafted by Adam C. Carson) to create the long-planned Shenandoah National Park. The following year, Will Carson as head of the Conservation and Development Commission purchased fishing rights for more than 10,000 acres along the Rapidan River. Virginia planned to pay for the condemned land in abbreviated proceedings, then donate it to create the proposed national park, citing its proximity to the national capital and other East Coast cities, as well as increased tourism and revenue from national parks already created in the western United States.

Even before his inaugulation, Carson hosted President Herbert Hoover (elected in 1928 and an enthusiastic fly fisherman), with his wife and retinue in Criglersville. The Presidential party rode horses up the Rapidan River to a fishing camp, where Hoover later celebrated his 55th birthday. Although Virginians offered to give Hoover what is now known as Rapidan Camp (but sometimes as Camp Hoover), the President used his own funds to buy the land for $1,045 (at the going rate of $5 per acre), and building materials for $22,719. The Marine Corps provided construction labor for drainage, electricity and telephone lines as a "military exercise" by September 1929.

In 1930, Carson convinced President Hoover and Congress to appropriate money to create Skyline Drive, in part using drought relief funds, and to assist the growing number of unemployed. In July 1931, the VDC deeded the federal government a one hundred foot right of way forty two miles long. Although Hoover lost his 1932 re-election bid in a landslide, before leaving office he named Carson as one of the trustees of the Presidential Summer Camp, which was expected to become part of Shenandoah National Park. However, his successor, Franklin D. Roosevelt, preferred a Maryland location with a possible pool, which became Camp David. Moreover, when Hoover added up accounts, he found he personally spent $114,000 for the camp and school buildings and furnishings in the Rapidan development, even though the appraisal commissioners evaluated his donation at $26,861.80

Since Virginia's constitution did not permit re-election of governors, and particularly after Byrd suggested that the next governor should be a businessman, some reporters considered Carson a candidate to succeed Byrd in the 1929 state election. Other potential candidates included former Virginia Attorney General (and Byrd opponent) John Garland Pollard of Williamsburg (a dry Baptist who ultimately became Governor), B. Frank Buchanan of Smyth County, George Peery of Tazewell County and G. Walter Mapp of Northampton County. After "wet" Democrat Alfred E. Smith lost the 1928 Presidential election, Virginia Democrats wanted to reduce the influence of Methodist Bishop James Cannon Jr., long a fierce temperance advocate. In February 1929, Carson announced he would not be a candidate, and continued to campaign against Republican candidate William Moseley Brown (an educator, Masonic leader and former Democrat), and Pollard won by a 2-to-1 margin. However, after the election, Carson refused to endorse Byrd loyalist (and former Speaker) Thomas W. Ozlin to replace Elmer O. Flippin as the DVC's executive secretary. Carson was also "boomed" as a gubernatorial candidate in 1932 and 1934.

By May 1929 Carson had recommended the creation of a state park in the Tidewater region, with the cooperation of Princess Anne County, to include Cape Henry, where English colonists first landed. The proposed acreage in August 1933 was 3000 acres. Ultimately, it would link the historical sites of Jamestown, Williamsburg and Yorktown. The federal government acquired Jamestown island in 1934, and dedicated the Colonial National Monument (which after 1936 became Colonial National Historical Park). Nearby the land in Virginia Beach became Seashore State Park (now First Landing State Park), one of the original six Virginia state parks, but dedicated after Carson's tenure. During and after his tenure, locals wanted it to become part of Colonial National Park, which never happened.

Carson also met with federal officials. In February 1931, he discussed the proposed George Washington Memorial Parkway with officials in the Hoover administration. Carson participated in transferring land to the National Park Service which became Richmond National Battlefield Park in 1934. Other important Civil War battlefields were discussed by the Fredericksburg and Spotsylvania National Battlefield Commission, and Congressman R. Walton Moore succeeded V.M. Fleming as member of that board during Carson's VDC tenure, but that battlefield dedication occurred in 1935 (in the Roosevelt administration after Carson's tenure). In 1932 Governor Pollard proclaimed Carson as the outstanding public servant in the state. The New York Southern Society also awarded him its Parchment of Distinction that year, which he shared with Douglas Southall Freeman (known for his civil war histories) and John D. Rockefeller Jr. (who created Colonial Williamsburg.

Many people living in mountainous areas of Virginia did not have proper title to their homesteads, even though ancestors had lived there for generations. This proved a severe problem for the 1300 families living in the proposed Shenandoah National Park, many of whom received appraisals for far less than they thought their property worth. While people with proper titles received compensation pursuant to the state blanket condemnation statute drafted by A.C. Carson, those without titles (half of those within the park were tenants or squatters) were subject to eviction without compensation. One landowner, Thomas J. Rudacille, filed a lawsuit in state court, arguing that the condemnation was designed to benefit the federal government (not the state) and thus violated the state constitution. The Virginia Supreme Court upheld the law in January 1931, requiring the state to prove the value of each parcel and to pay the owners. By the end of March, condemnation proceedings had been filed in all affected counties. By January 1932, (as with the case of Smoky Mountain National Park to the south), land acquisition costs had increased, so Virginia's Governor reduced the original planned acreage by half and eliminated some of the highest priced parcels (thus reducing size 325,000 to 160,000 acres). Carson also announced that a 15-mile portion of Skyline Drive would be opened between October 12 until November 30, 1932 (during the peak autumn foliage season, weather permitting). Carson also announced large donations totaling over $213,000 from wealthy non-Virginians, including the estate of Thomas Edison, as well as from Edsel Ford and John D. Rockefeller III. He also announced that creditors for a tract totaling 22,000 acres in Rockingham County (about an eighth of the acreage minimum the federal government required for the park's creation) had accepted $2 per acre.

In early 1934 (another federal but not state election year) William Carson signed the Shenandoah Park eviction notices, which were soon posted. On August 17, 1934, Carson and Governor George Peery signed documents deeding 188,000 acres to the federal government, and widely publicized photographs showed President Franklin Roosevelt and Secretary of Interior Harold Ickes present to accept them. A federal resettlement project bought 343 acres at Ida for 28 proposed farms, but the solicitor general notified Secretary Ickes that the statute only authorized houses for refugees from urban centers, so the project was moved from the Resettlement Administration to the Farm Security Administration, but still only 172 families were absorbed, out of the 464 eligible counted in 1934. The evictions were scheduled for completion by November 1, 1934. On November 10, 1934, another landowner, Robert H. Via, filed a lawsuit in the U.S. District Court for the Western District at Harrisonburg, and another petition in the U.S. District Court for the District of Columbia seeking to prohibit U.S. Interior Secretary Ickes from accepting the deeds previously delivered to him. A.C. Carson argued the case before a panel consisting of Judges John Paul, John J. Parker and William C. Coleman on December 10, 1934. Judge Paul issued the panel's decision on January 12, 1935 upholding the state's power of eminent domain. Via appealed and the U.S. Supreme Court noted probable jurisdiction, then heard oral arguments on November 19, 1935, before affirming the panel's decision on November 25, 1935.

==== State park controversies ====
Meanwhile, in early November 1934, as the eviction deadline passed and congressional elections approached on November 6, Carson was embroiled in several controversies. Legislators had proposed reorganizing the commission and not funding it since September, in order to force his resignation, which they passed on November 5. In addition to becoming embroiled in the dam/power controversies (in what became Claytor Lake State Park in 1939), Carson declined to sign a federal contract with respect to a state park in Chesterfield County (which later became Swift Run Recreation Area, now Pocahontas State Park), aligning his views with Governor Peery by stating the state lacked funds to meet the federal government's precondition. The State Auditor also announced beginning an audit concerning funds spend in establishing Shenandoah National Park and Seashore State Park (possibly in conjunction with a Richmond Times-Dispatch article condemning Carson for withholding a National Park Service report concerning trees cut during creation of Seashore State Park), but by mid-March the audit exonerated Carson (and Governor Peery praised him). On November 7, 1934, Carson issued a statement from his Riverton office that he had completed much of the work he had planned and announced his resignation as of the year end, consistent with the Commission's reorganization effective January 1, 1935.

The day after Christmas, Carson tried to visit engineer-in-charge James R. Lassiter at Luray, but was lost on Skyline Drive in a blizzard, prompting his family to call 20 local hospitals and Lassiter to deploy three entire CCC camps (about 600 men) as well as the state police, who located Carson and secured medical attention. He improved enough to attend a year-end dinner at the Randolph Macon Academy planned by state and local officials to honor his service. State senator Aubrey G. Weaver was toastmaster; speakers included Secretary of Interior Harold Ickes and National Park Service director Arno Cammerer; and President Roosevelt, Senator Byrd, and others sent congratulatory messages.

The new Conservation and Development Commission appointed by Governor Peery on December 31, 1934 included Wilbur C. Hall of Leesburg (the second oldest member of the House of Delegates, who soon resigned that legislative position to become the new chairman), D.D. Hull of Roanoke, Marshall Booker of Halifax, Braden Vandeventer of Norfolk and C.S. Carter of Bristol.

=== Later years ===
In March 1935, after Carson's Conservation and Development Commission tenure in Virginia had ended, he issued a 100-page report entitled "Conserving and Developing Virginia" and listed 14 future development projects. Although he attempted to become a candidate to succeed Governor Peery in 1937, that attempt fizzled, with the Norfolk-Ledger Dispatch noting "Virginia's Old Guard" was out to "get" Carson. However, Carson continued on the 7th District Democratic Committee (and was its representative on the State Democratic Committee) until June 12, 1940.

After his resignation, Carson received honors and continued in the parks movement. In 1935, the American Scenic and Historic Preservation Society of New York awarded Carson its Cornelius Amory Pugsley Silver Medal for his work commemorating historic sites and establishing parks. As noted above, in August 1936, during Carson's summer voyage to examine the lime and cement plants of England, Germany, France and Switzerland, the British Scientific and Industrial Research Society elected him a fellow, recognizing his contributions to ceramics, lime and mortar technology.

Carson became vice president of the National Conference on State Parks, and continued in that office until 1940. Meanwhile, Governor Peery and Carson's successor, Wilbur C. Hall dedicated Virginia's first six state parks in a ceremony at Hungry Mother State Park in Smyth County near Peery's alma mater, Emory Henry College on June 15, 1936. The other original Virginia state parks (beside Seashore/First Landing) were Douthat State Park in Alleghany and Bath Counties, Fairy Stone State Park in Patrick County, Staunton River State Park in Halifax County and Westmoreland State Park in the county of the same name. Weeks later, on July 3, 1936, President Roosevelt dedicated Shenandoah National Park, and some northern Virginia papers and letter writers noted the absence of mentions of Carson's contributions to that effort, and suggested erecting a historical marker to honor him. The Commission denied a Richmond Times Dispatch story that Carson was not invited to either event, and stated that he attended the Hungry Mother dedication and was on the platform at the Shenandoah National Park Dedication.

On June 21, 1938, the State Commission on Conservation and Development changed its name to become the Virginia Conservation Commission. That September, the peak tourist season for Virginia's mountain parks, Hall praised Carson as founder of Virginia's state park system in several speeches, including at a ceremony within Fairy Stone State Park marking the dedication of a tablet honoring J.B. Fishburn of Roanoke, who had donated 5,000 acres which became that park. In March 1939, the new governor announced N. Clarence Smith as the agency's new director, and the following month Carson's sometime embattled friend R.E. Burson, who had been Director of Parks under Carson, was replaced as assistant director of the Virginia Conservation Commission by Randolph Odell, formerly of the National Park Service.

The southern section of Skyline Drive (a/k/a Blue Ridge Parkway connecting to the Great Smoky Mountains) was dedicated at summer's end in 1939. During Carson's tenure, Civilian Conservation Corps workers also created improvements in the George Washington National Forest in several Counties near Skyline Drive south of Shenandoah National Park, as well as areas near other national parks and monuments, some of which became state parks in his lifetime. Appomattox Court House National Park in Appomattox County) near Virginia's geographic center (but an area with significant financial hardship because of its distance from industrial centers as well as agricultural issues based on decades of cultivation of hilly soil) was created on federal land transferred from the War Department to the National Park Service in 1935. Nearby state lands were improved in Buckingham, Prince Edward, Charlotte, and Campbell counties that became Bear Creek Lake State Park and Holliday Lake State Park. In northern Virginia, the CCC built the George Washington Birthplace National Monument near Westmoreland State Park. Between 1933 and 1936, the Resettlement Administration built the Chopawamsic Recreational Demonstration Area near Quantico Marine Base in Prince William and (minimally) Stafford County, which the Office of Strategic Services used in World War II and after the conflict became Prince William Forest Park. In 1938, CCC crews also worked at the Front Royal Recreation Park, and Carson formally donated the 69 acres in his son's memory in a ceremony circa July 9, 1938.

However, like Shenandoah National Park (which created a separate area at Lewis Mountain for "Negroes" in 1939), the original state parks were segregated. A lawsuit concerning that segregation resulted in the creation of a Prince Edward County Park (which is now Twin Lakes State Park) and advocacy by local groups in 1936 led to dedication in 1939 of an area in the George Washington Forest near Longdale, Virginia which is now the Green Pastures Recreation Area.

In mid-September, 1941, shortly before Carson's death, Hall announced that a historical marker had been ordered to honor Carson. Although it was originally to be erected on Skyline Drive, it is now in Front Royal, en route to what became Shenandoah River State Park decades later. That September, Carson was part of a committee to select a peak in the Great Smoky Mountain National Park near Gatlinburg, Tennessee to honor Arno B. Cammerer, the late director of the National Park Service. In early August 1941, the CIO instituted a strike at Riverton Lime, which was settled with a 3 cent wage increase.

Carson's last major public appearance may have been on November 17, 1941, as chairman of the dedication committee for the new bridges of the North and South Branches of the Shenandoah River between Riverton and Front Royal and the Crooked Run bridge just north of them. Virginia governor James H. Price and state senator Aubrey G. Weaver led the event; the former Riverton bridges having been criticized as the state's No. 1 traffic hazard in 1938.

== Death and legacy ==
Carson died of a chronic heart ailment and kidney issues on March 25, 1942, and was buried at Prospect Hill cemetery in Front Royal. His widow died three years later in Broward County, Florida and was later buried beside him and their son, William E. Carson Jr. The Library of Virginia holds his scrapbooks of newspaper clippings (1928–1941), Virginia Conservation Commission meeting books (1926–1933), records of the Virginia State Commission on Conservation and Development, and numerous radio talks. A historic marker in his memory was placed outside Front Royal in 1948, en route to the Shenandoah River State Park (established 1994, and whose interior exhibits include mention of this prominent philanthropist). Carson Mountain in Shenandoah National Park was named in his honor shortly after his death. His home in Front Royal was placed on the National Register of Historic Places in 1993.

== Bibliography ==
Virginia's Natural Wonders (Virginia Consrvation Commission 1932)
Historic Shrines of Virginia (with Virginia State Historian H.J. Eckenrode) (Richmond: Virginia State Commission on Conservation and Development 1933)
