= List of Virginia state parks =

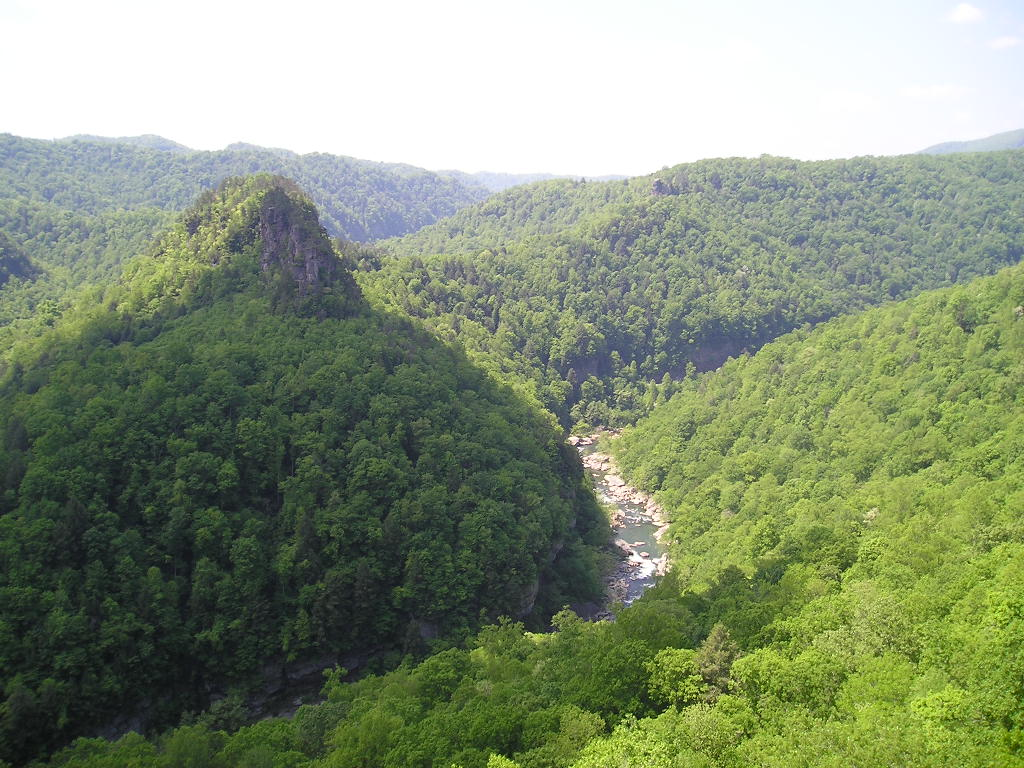
Breaks Canyon, located in Breaks Interstate Park

This is a list of state parks and reserves in the Virginia state park system.

Virginia opened its state park system on June 15, 1936 as a six-park system. The six original state parks were Seashore State Park (now First Landing State Park), Westmoreland State Park, Staunton River State Park, Douthat State Park, Fairy Stone State Park, and Hungry Mother State Park. In addition to the 44 official state parks, two additional properties, the Southwest Virginia Museum and the Green Pastures Recreation Area, are also administered as part of the state park system.

== State parks ==
Virginia State Parks (Hover mouse over pog to popup clickable link)
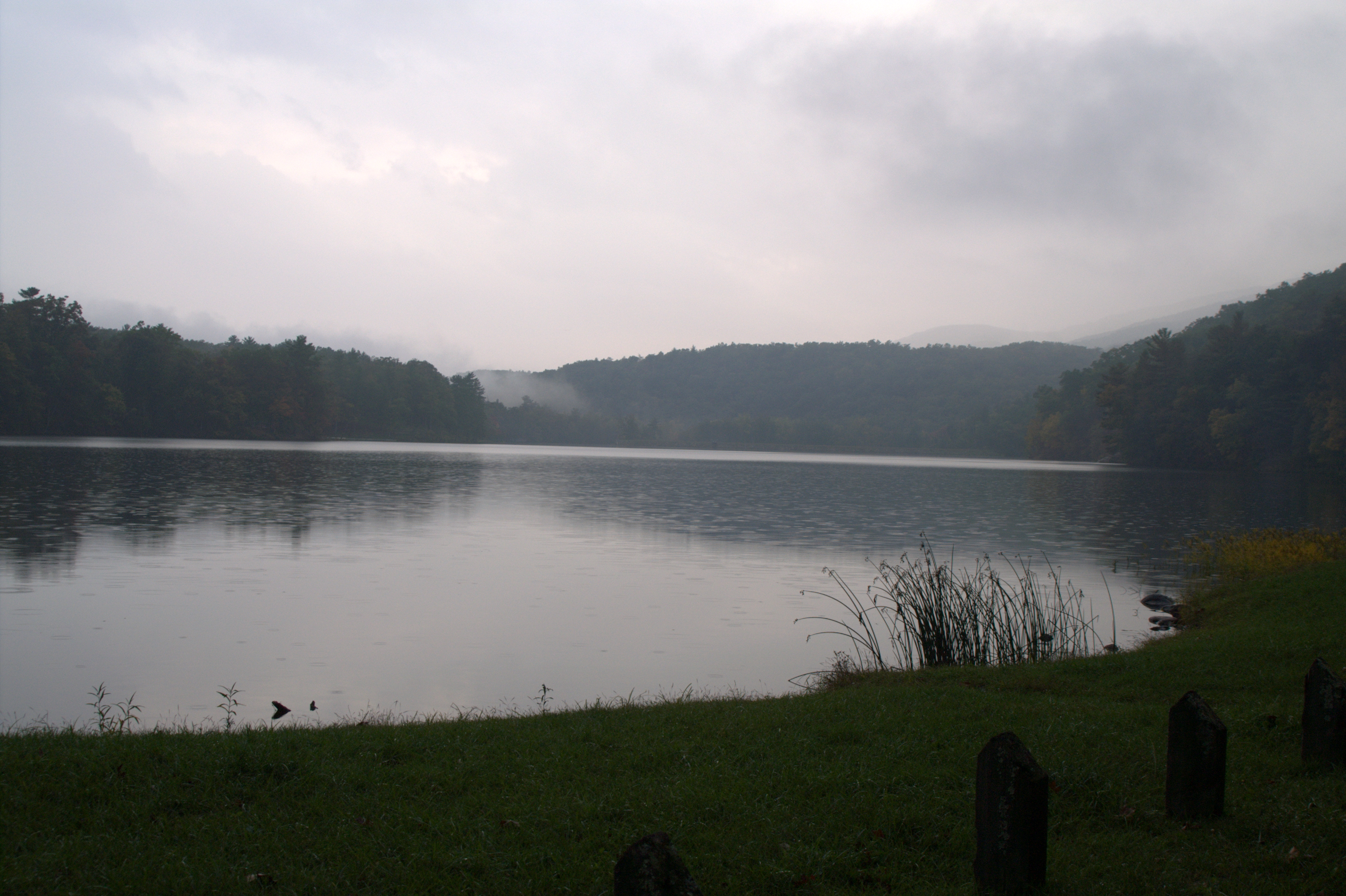
Douthat
State Park

Hungry Mother
State Park

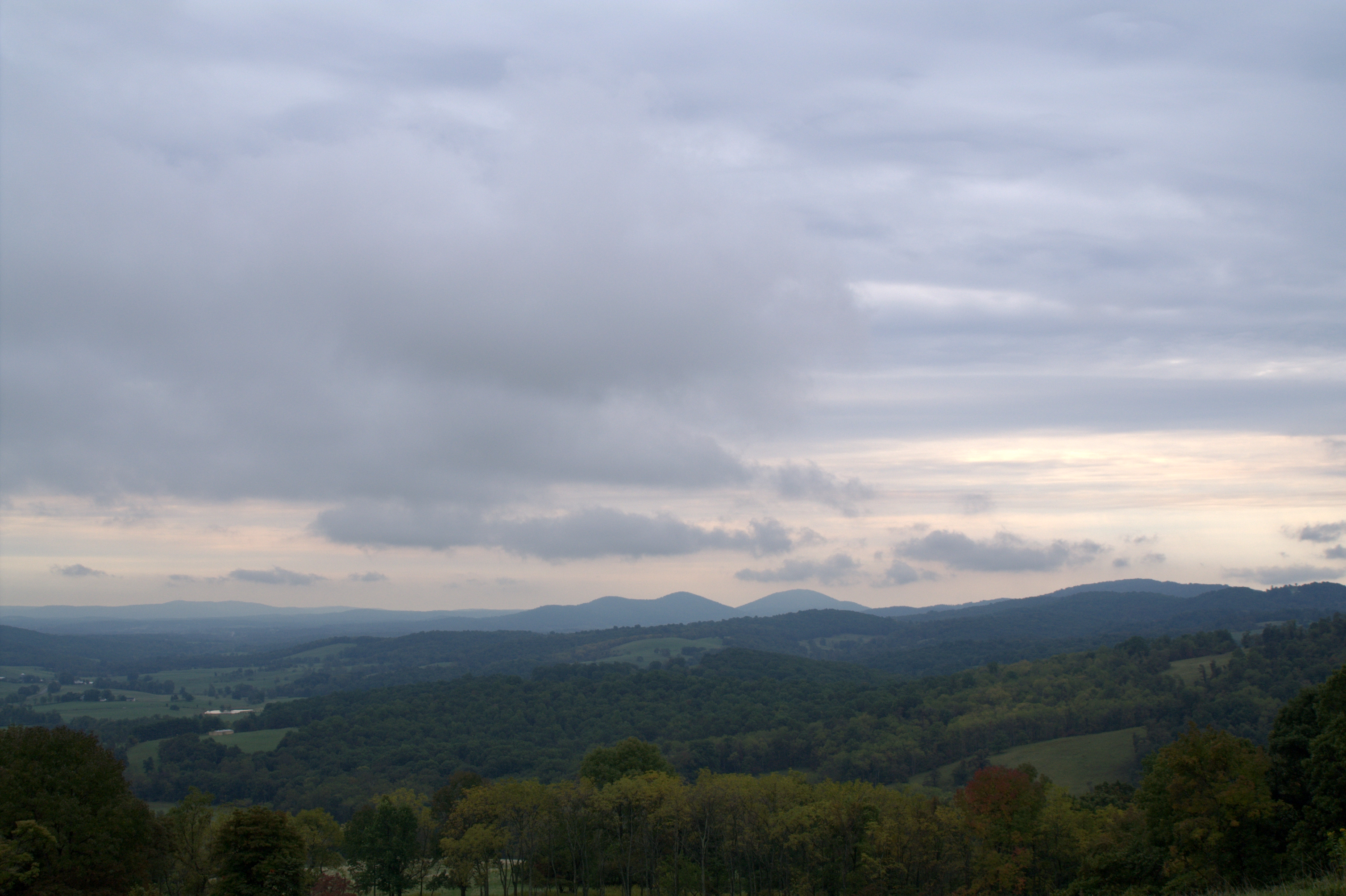
Sky Meadows State Park

Name	Web- site	Location	Size	Established	Status	Remarks
Bear Creek Lake State Park		Cumberland	329 acres (1.33 km^{2})	1939	Open	
Belle Isle State Park		Lancaster County	892 acres (3.61 km^{2})	1993	Open	
Breaks Interstate Park		Breaks	4,500 acres (18 km^{2})	1954	Open	
Caledon State Park		King George	2,587 acres (10.47 km^{2})	1974	Open	
Chippokes State Park		Surry	1,947 acres (7.88 km^{2})	1967	Open	
Claytor Lake State Park		Dublin	472 acres (1.91 km^{2})	1951	Open	
Clinch River State Park		St. Paul	1,092 acres (4.42 km^{2})	2019	Open	As of January 2024, two main properties are open to the public.
Culpeper Battlefields State Park		Culpeper	263 acres (1.06 km^{2})	2024	Open	
Douthat State Park		Millboro	4,545 acres (18.39 km^{2})	1936	Open	
Fairy Stone State Park		Stuart	4,741 acres (19.19 km^{2})	1936	Open	
Falling Spring Falls State Park		Covington	19 acres (0.077 km^{2})	2004	Open	Administered by Douthat State Park
False Cape State Park		Virginia Beach	3,844 acres (15.56 km^{2})	1968	Open	
First Landing State Park		Virginia Beach	2,888 acres (11.69 km^{2})	1936	Open	Originally Seashore State Park
Grayson Highlands State Park		Mouth of Wilson	4,502 acres (18.22 km^{2})	1965	Open	
Green Pastures Recreation Area		Clifton Forge	133 acres (0.54 km^{2})	2021	Open	Administered by Douthat State Park
Hayfields State Park		Highland County	1,034 acres (4.18 km^{2})	2025	Open	Limited hours
High Bridge Trail State Park		Farmville	1,236 acres (5.00 km^{2})	2006	Open	
Holliday Lake State Park		Appomattox	560 acres (2.3 km^{2})	1939	Open	
Hungry Mother State Park		Marion	3,334 acres (13.49 km^{2})	1939	Open	
James River State Park		Gladstone	1,561 acres (6.32 km^{2})	1993	Open	
Kiptopeke State Park		Cape Charles	562 acres (2.27 km^{2})	1992	Open	
Lake Anna State Park		Spotsylvania County	3,127 acres (12.65 km^{2})	1972	Open	
Leesylvania State Park		Woodbridge	556 acres (2.25 km^{2})	1975	Open	
Machicomoco State Park		Gloucester	645 acres (2.61 km^{2})	2020	Open	
Mason Neck State Park		Lorton	1,856 acres (7.51 km^{2})	1967	Open	
Natural Bridge State Park		Natural Bridge	1,540 acres (6.2 km^{2})	2016	Open	
Natural Tunnel State Park		Duffield	909 acres (3.68 km^{2})	1967	Open	
New River Trail State Park		Fosters Falls	1,217 acres (4.93 km^{2})	1987	Open	
Occoneechee State Park		Clarksville	2,698 acres (10.92 km^{2})	1968	Open	
Pocahontas State Park		Chesterfield	7,919 acres (32.05 km^{2})	1946	Open	
Powhatan State Park		Powhatan	1,565 acres (6.33 km^{2})	2003	Open	
Sailor's Creek Battlefield State Park		Rice	379 acres (1.53 km^{2})	1937	Open	
Seven Bends State Park		Woodstock	1,066 acres (4.31 km^{2})	2019	Open	
Shenandoah River Raymond R. "Andy" Guest Jr. State Park		Bentonville	1,619 acres (6.55 km^{2})	1994	Open	
Shot Tower Historical State Park		Austinville	10 acres (0.040 km^{2})	1964	Open	
Sky Meadows State Park		Delaplane	1,860 acres (7.5 km^{2})	1975	Open	
Smith Mountain Lake State Park		Huddleston	1,248 acres (5.05 km^{2})	1967	Open	
Southwest Virginia Museum Historical State Park		Big Stone Gap	1.5 acres (0.0061 km^{2})	1943	Open	
Staunton River State Park		Scottsburg	2,336 acres (9.45 km^{2})	1939	Open	
Staunton River Battlefield State Park		Randolph	300 acres (1.2 km^{2})	1955	Open	
Sweet Run State Park		Hillsboro	884 acres (3.58 km^{2})	2023	Open	Facilities under development
Twin Lakes State Park		Green Bay	548 acres (2.22 km^{2})	1936	Open	
Westmoreland State Park		Montross	1,321 acres (5.35 km^{2})	1936	Open	
Widewater State Park		Stafford	1,089 acres (4.41 km^{2})	2019	Open	
Wilderness Road State Park		Ewing	327 acres (1.32 km^{2})	1993	Open	
York River State Park		Williamsburg	2,954 acres (11.95 km^{2})	1969	Open	

== See also ==
- List of national parks of the United States
- List of Virginia state forests
- List of Virginia Natural Area Preserves
- List of Virginia Wildlife Management Areas
