= Scottsburg =

Scottsburg may refer to:

- Scottsburg, former name of Centerville, Fresno County, California
- Scottsburg, Indiana
- Scottsburg, Virginia
