= Clinch River State Park =

State park in Virginia, United States

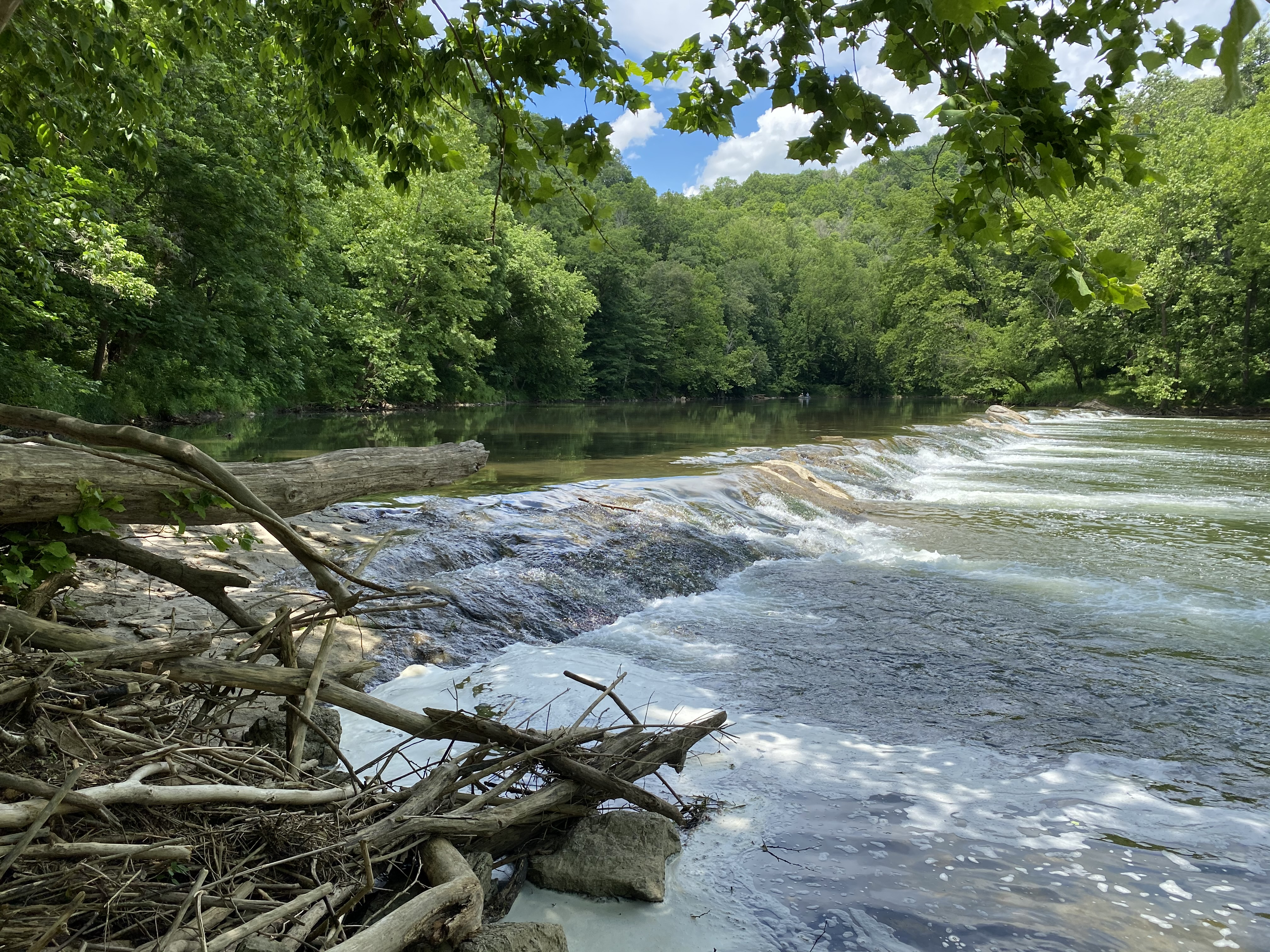
- Burton's Ford Falls - Clinch River

- Location within Virginia Location within the United States
- Location: Tazewell, Russell, Wise, and Scott Counties, Virginia
- Nearest city: St. Paul, Virginia
- Coordinates: 36°53′55″N 82°19′03″W
- Area: 1,092 acres (442 ha)
- Established: 2019
- Governing body: Virginia Department of Conservation and Recreation

Clinch River State Park is a river-based state park in Tazewell, Russell, Wise, and Scott counties in Southwest Virginia. It was dedicated by Gov. Ralph Northam on 16 June 2021 as the 41st park in the Virginia State Park system. The park preserves some of the most scenic and ecologically diverse parts of the Clinch River. It is the first "blueway" park in the Commonwealth.

== Details ==
The Clinch River, known as "Virginia's Hidden River," contains the highest number of imperiled freshwater animals in the country, including 29 varieties of rare freshwater mussels and 19 species of fish. Other rare species include the hellbender, loggerhead musk turtle, and the green-faced clubtail dragonfly. Since 1990, The Nature Conservancy has worked to preserve the Clinch River watershed as part of its "Last Great Places" program.

When completely developed, the park will constitute a “string of pearls” of anchor properties along an approximately 135-mile (217 km) section of the river from Tazewell County to the Tennessee border. These anchor properties will be connected by multiple canoe/kayak access points for visitors to enjoy the river through such activities as boating, fishing, and sightseeing.

There are two major units open for public use. The Sugar Hill Unit in St. Paul (Wise County) consists of 400 acres and has nearly 9 miles of hiking trails for hiking and biking, and more than 2 miles of river access. There is also a picnic area. Cultural relics include the remains of an 18th-century French settlement. The Artrip Bent Unit comprises 232 undeveloped acres with boat access in Russell County.

The park is currently in development status and there are no facilities available.

== See also ==
- List of Virginia state parks
