= Killahevlin =

Historic house in Virginia, United States

- U.S. National Register of Historic Places
- Virginia Landmarks Register
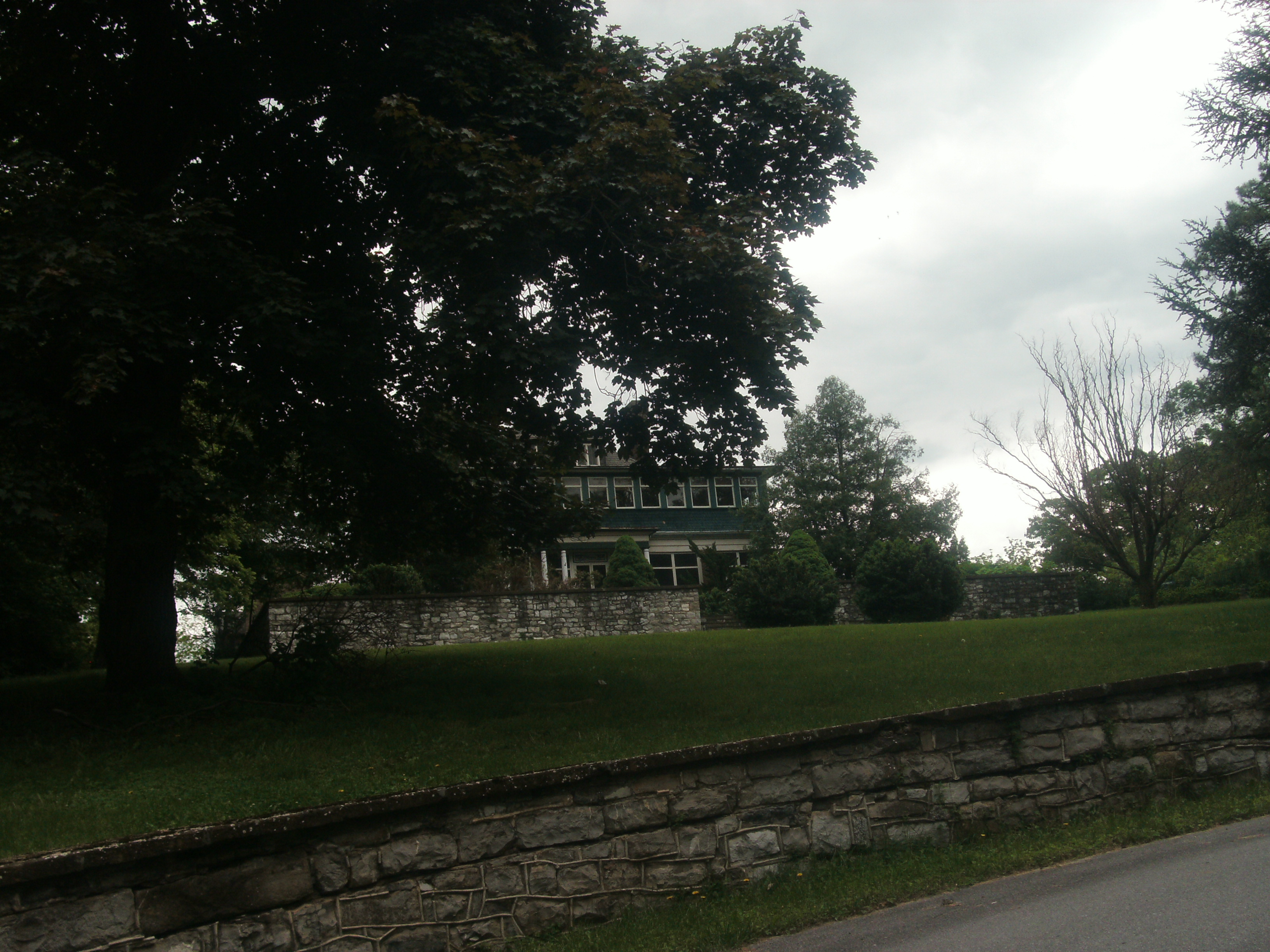
- Killahevlin in May, 2016

- Location within Shenandoah Valley Location within Northern Virginia Location within Virginia Location within the United States
- Location: 1401 N Royal Ave., Front Royal, Virginia
- Coordinates: 38°56′12″N 78°11′38″W
- Area: 2.9 acres (1.2 ha)
- Built: c. 1905
- Architect: Mullett, A.B., and Co.
- Architectural style: Queen Anne
- NRHP reference No.: 93001128
- VLR No.: 112-0024

Significant dates
- Added to NRHP: October 14, 1993
- Designated VLR: August 18, 1993

Killahevlin is an historic home located at Front Royal, Warren County, Virginia. It is a large 2 1/2-story, Queen Anne-style brick dwelling, built about 1905 for William E. Carson, president of the Riverton Lime Company.

Carson directed the formation of Virginia's recreational parks system, established the state's system of historical road markers, and was instrumental in the creation of the Shenandoah National Park and the Skyline Drive.

In 1906, at the age of 36, Carson married Agnes Holladay McCarthy in Richmond.

The upcoming marriage provided an impetus for the construction of the Riverton home where the couple would live for the next thirty-six years. The house was called "Killahevlin," after the Irish home of a boyhood friend where Carson had often visited. That estate is now the famous Killyhevlin Lakeside Hotel in Enniskillen, Northern Ireland.

Designed by the Washington, D.C., firm of A. B. Mullett and Co., Killahevlin is a distinctive Front Royal landmark. The modified Queen Anne style house contains fine early 20th-century interior woodwork and other arresting architectural detail.

Other trademark Mullet designs include the Capitol Park Hotel, Hotel Harris, Farmers and Merchants Bank, and the Annex to the Union Trust Building—all in the District of Columbia; as well as Visitation Monastery in the Alta Vista neighborhood of Bethesda, Maryland; and various residences in and around Washington, D.C.

Carson's older brother, A. C. Carson, was generally known as Kit after the famous American frontiersman. Kit had studied law at the University of Virginia and, in 1893, had gone to work in the Winchester legal firm of Richard Evelyn Byrd.

For many years, the Carson family enjoyed a friendly relationship with the Byrds and, through them, with Virginia's Democratic Party.

Will Carson served for thirty years on the Democratic State Central Committee (1910-1940), and his work with the Conservation and Development Commission was highly praised by the press and public, despite a controversy over his highly personalized management of its programs. He was mentioned as a possible candidate for the governorship in 1929 and again in 1933.

In 1933, as a memorial to their only son, who had died of pneumonia at the age of 17, the Carsons donated 63 acres of land for a public golf and country club to the town. The Front Royal Golf Club still operates an 18-hole course initially built to Carson's design.

Carson retired from the political arena to Killahevlin and died in 1942.

Also on the property are the contributing guesthouse/water tower and two gazebos. The house has in the past been operated as a bed and breakfast.

It was listed on the National Register of Historic Places in 1993.
