= Hayfields State Park =

State park in Virginia, United States

- Location within Virginia Location within the United States
- Location: Highland County, Virginia
- Nearest city: McDowell, Virginia
- Coordinates: 38°15′43″N 79°33′11″W
- Area: 1,034 acres (418 ha)
- Established: 2025
- Governing body: Virginia Department of Conservation and Recreation

Hayfields State Park is a state park in Highland County, Virginia, near McDowell. The 1,034-acre (4.18 km^{2}) park was dedicated by Governor Glenn Youngkin on October 20, 2025 as Virginia's 44th state park and the first state park in Highland County. The park is located between the Bullpasture and Jack Mountains and contains a diverse landscape of wooded mountain land and valley pastures.

== History ==
The property was acquired by the Virginia Outdoors Foundation in 2017 in order to mitigate the effects of the planned Atlantic Coast Pipeline crossing nine conservation easements in the area. In 2023, 994 acres were transferred to the Virginia Department of Conservation and Recreation for the purposes of creating and administering a state park. The remaining 40 acres were transferred shortly before the park opened in 2025.

== Features ==
The park is home to four miles of easy-to-moderate hiking and biking trails and fishing access along the Bullpasture River. The park property also contains a farmhouse and a small cabin where a local doctor practiced medicine in the mid-19th century.

The park is currently operating under limited hours and visitors are encouraged to call ahead to ensure the park is open.

== See also ==
- List of Virginia state parks
