= Seven Bends State Park =

State park in Virginia, United States

- Location within Virginia
- Location: Shenandoah County, Virginia
- Nearest city: Woodstock, Virginia
- Coordinates: 38°51′17″N 78°29′25″W
- Area: 1,066 acres (431 ha)
- Established: 2019
- Governing body: Virginia Department of Conservation and Recreation

Seven Bends State Park is a state park in the U.S. state of Virginia, located approximately 2 miles (3.2 km) southeast of the town of Woodstock, near the historic "Seven Bends" region of the North Fork Shenandoah River. The park, Virginia's 41st, provides recreational and land-based outdoor recreational and educational opportunities for visitors while protecting the natural resources of the river and the surrounding landscape.

== History ==
The park was assembled from several different parcels of land bordering the river. Dr. James R. Myers donated 674 acres (273 ha) next to the reservoir. The Town of Woodstock donated approximately 85 acres (34 ha) and the Commonwealth of Virginia purchased another parcel from the Massanutten Military Academy that contained over 306 acres (124 ha). This property had formerly been a camp for young boys known as "Camp Lupton."

The park opened to the public in late 2019 and was officially dedicated by Governor Glenn Youngkin on 14 June 2022.

== Description ==
The park land is bounded on the eastern side by Powell Mountain in the Massanutten Mountain range and the George Washington and Jefferson National Forests, which provides visitors with additional outdoor recreation opportunities. The park's western boundary is the Shenandoah River. The park lands along the banks of North Fork of the Shenandoah River generally consist of old floodplain terraces. Of the 1,066 acres of park land, approximately 234 acres (95 ha) are open fields that have been farmed as hay and row crops and are currently being maintained through agricultural leases.

North Fork Shenandoah River near Seven Bends State Park

== Entrances ==
The park has two entrances that are not interconnected to each other within the park. The Hollingsworth Road Entrance features a boat launch, picnic tables, and restroom facilities. The Bass Bight Trailhead is also accessed from this entrance. The Lupton Road entrance includes a parking area, picnic tables, boat launch, and access to the Gokotta and Eagles Edge Trails. The park has eight miles of hiking and biking trails, including two miles of trail that lie along the Shenandoah River.

== Activities ==
In addition to hiking, activities include fishing and boating. There are no designated swimming areas in the park due to the swift currents.

As of 2024, there is no visitor center, ranger station, or campground at the park.

== See also ==
- List of Virginia state parks
