= Green Pastures Recreation Area =

State park in Virginia, United States

Green Pasture Recreation Area
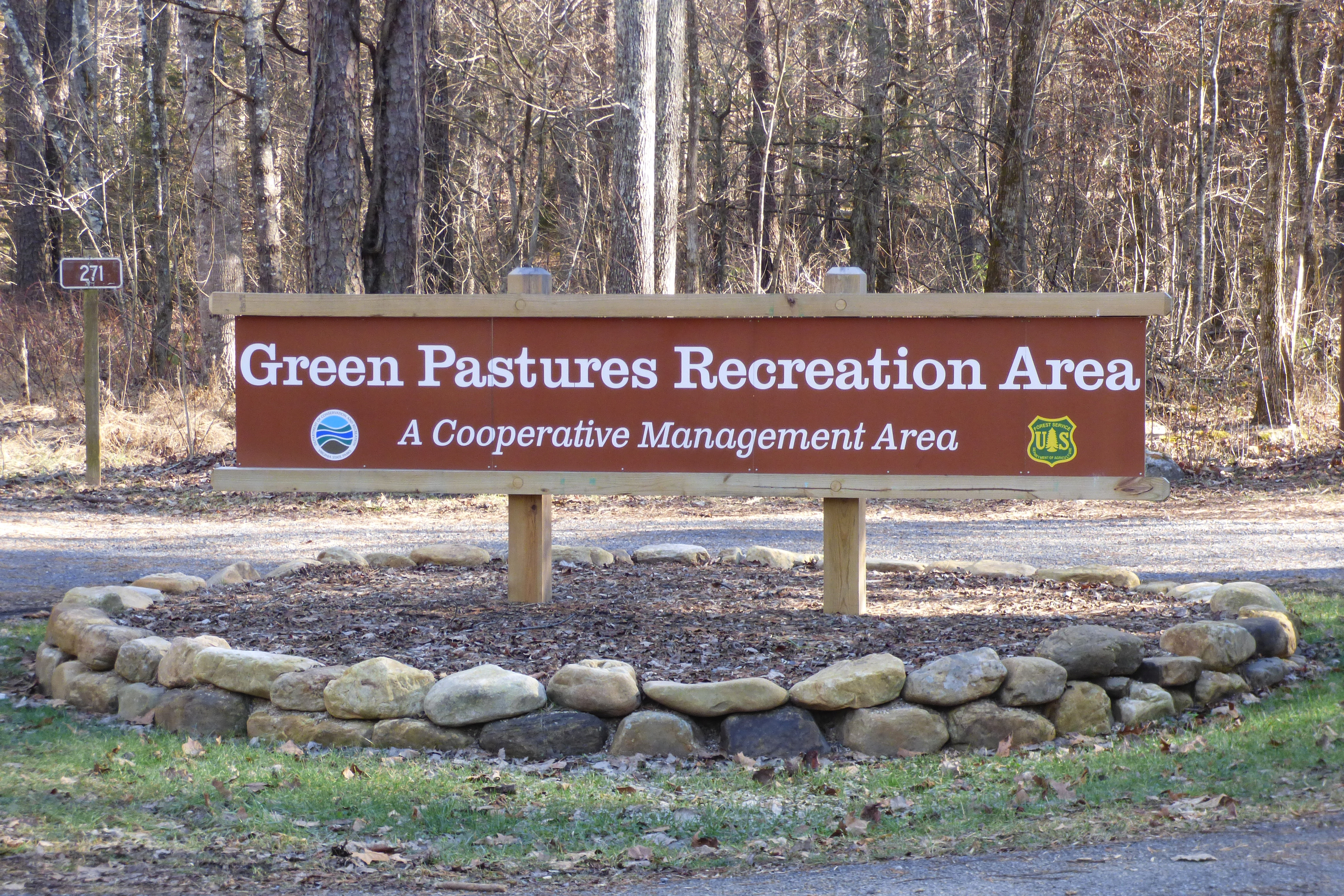

- Location within Virginia Location within the United States
- Location: Clifton Forge, Virginia
- Coordinates: 37°47′25″N 79°42′14″W
- Area: 133 acres (54 ha)
- Established: 1940
- Governing body: Virginia Department of Conservation and Recreation

Green Pastures Recreation Area (formerly Longdale Recreation Area) is a state park in Clifton Forge, Virginia, in the George Washington National Forest. The park contains over 8 miles of hiking and biking trails, as well as fishing in Blue Suck Run. The park is also home to an historic picnic shelter built by the Civilian Conservation Corps during the Great Depression.

Closed in 2017 but reopened in 2020 following community activism and support from the NAACP, Green Pastures Recreation Area is maintained today as an additional area of nearby Douthat State Park.

== History ==
The 133-acre (0.54 km^{2}) park was constructed in 1936 after lobbying from the Clifton Forge Chapter of the NAACP to create a park for black Virginians, and opened to the public in 1940. The park was officially desegregated in 1950, and renamed to Longdale Recreation Area after the surrounding town. The park was closed in 2017 due to budget issues. After community activism, amendments added to Governor Ralph Northam's 2020 budget bill reopened the park under its historic name, Green Pastures Recreation Area.

== See also ==
- Douthat State Park
- List of Virginia state parks
