= Powhatan State Park =

State park in Virginia, USA

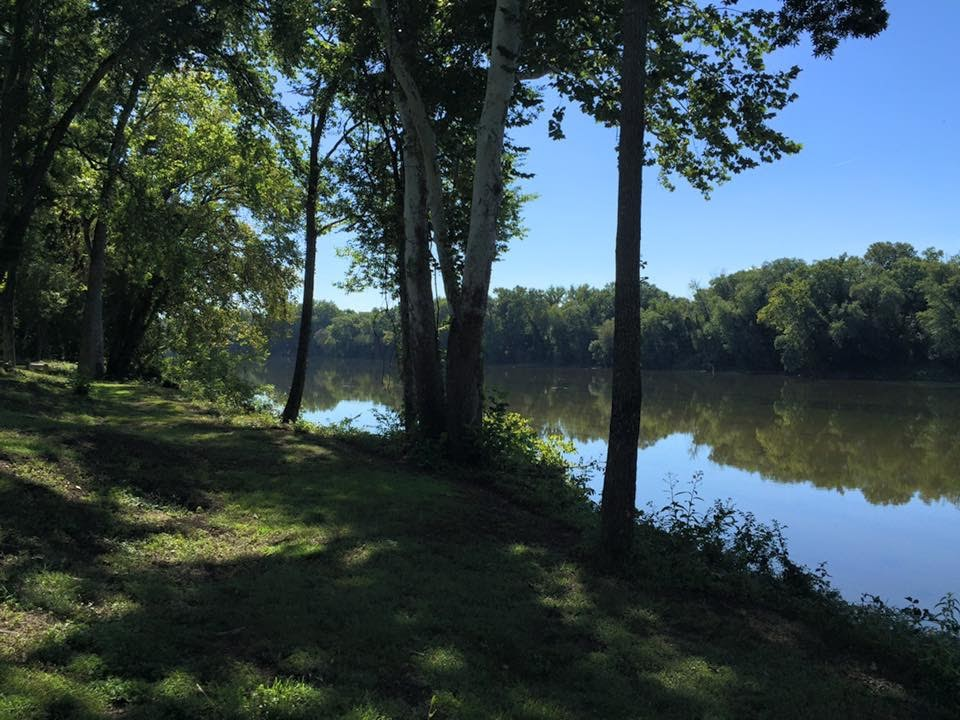
- James River at Powhatan State Park

- Location within Virginia Location within the United States
- Location: Powhatan county, Virginia, USA
- Nearest city: Powhatan, Virginia
- Coordinates: 37°39′35″N 77°55′22″W
- Area: 1,565 acres (6 km^{2})
- Established: July 6, 2013
- Governing body: Virginia Department of Conservation and Recreation

Powhatan State Park is a state park located along the James River in Virginia. It is in Powhatan County. The park is 1,565 acres (6 km^{2}) total with two miles (3.2 km) of riverfront. Powhatan opened in 2013 after a 10-year process of transferring it from use by the Virginia Department of Juvenile Justice to a Virginia state park.

== History ==
In 2003, 1,565 acres (6 km^{2}) were transferred from the Virginia Department of Juvenile Justice to the Virginia Department of Conservation and Recreation for the creation of the state park. The goal in creating the park was to provide access to state park facilities in central Virginia and to create both day-use and overnight facilities on the James River. Preparations were completed and Powhatan State Park was opened on 6 July 2013.

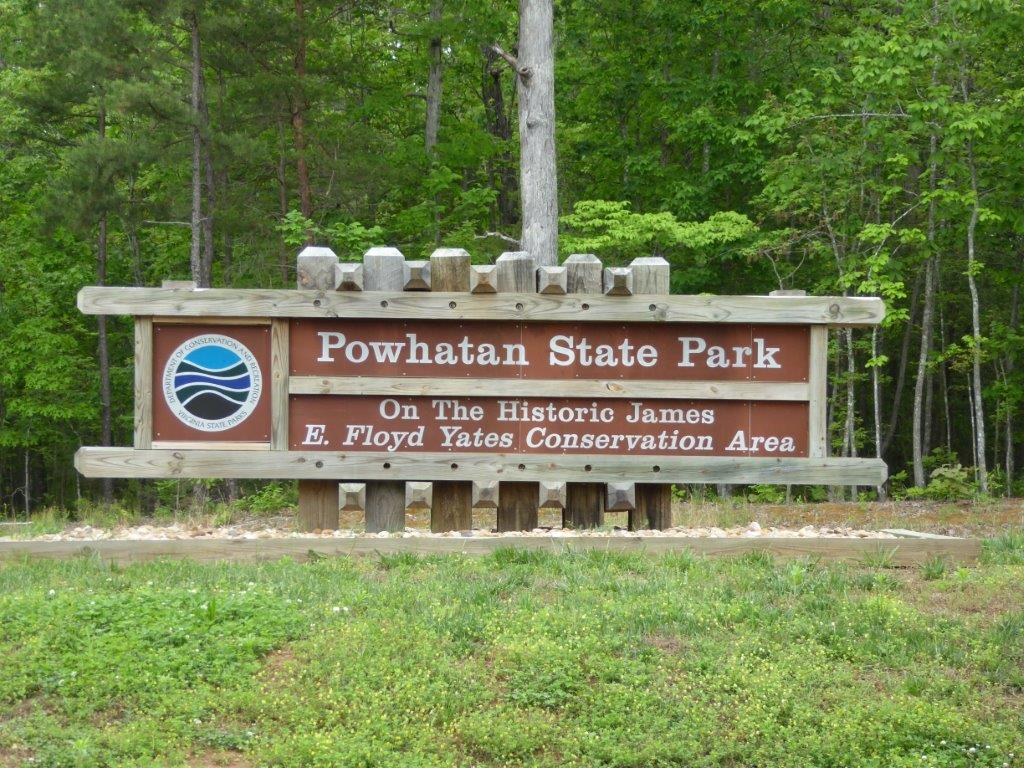
Park entrance sign

== Attractions ==
=== Trails ===
The park has five trails open. These total about 7.3 miles (11.7 km) of multi-use (hiking, biking, horse riding) trails through a number of diverse habitats including field edge, upland pine and mature hardwoods. The trails provide opportunities for viewing wildlife.

Equestrian parking is now open and horses are welcome on several trails.

=== Boating and fishing ===
The park has about 2.5 miles (4.0 km) of James River waterfront accessible by a canoe slide launch. Fishing access to the river bank is limited because of high bluffs, but easier access is being worked on. Fishing licenses are required and are available from the Virginia Department of Game and Inland Fisheries.

Visitors launching a canoe or kayak from the park may enjoy a five-mile float down river to the Maidens boat launch.

=== Camping ===
The park has a canoe-in campground which is accessible via the James River. This campground provides six primitive (no electricity or water) camping sites. There are restroom facilities but no bathhouses.

The park boasts a new full service campground, which opened on November 1, 2016. Electric and water sites, including one accessible site and several pull through, are available by reservation. Specific site selection is possible for some of the sites. The new campground includes a bathhouse. A dump station has been built near the campground for those with campers and RVs.

=== Picnic shelters ===
The park has three large picnic shelters. Each has picnic tables and a charcoal grill. None has electricity or water. Two of the picnic areas have accessible playground areas. All have restroom facilities.

== See also ==
- List of Virginia state parks
- List of Virginia state forests
