= Widewater State Park =

State park in Virginia, United States

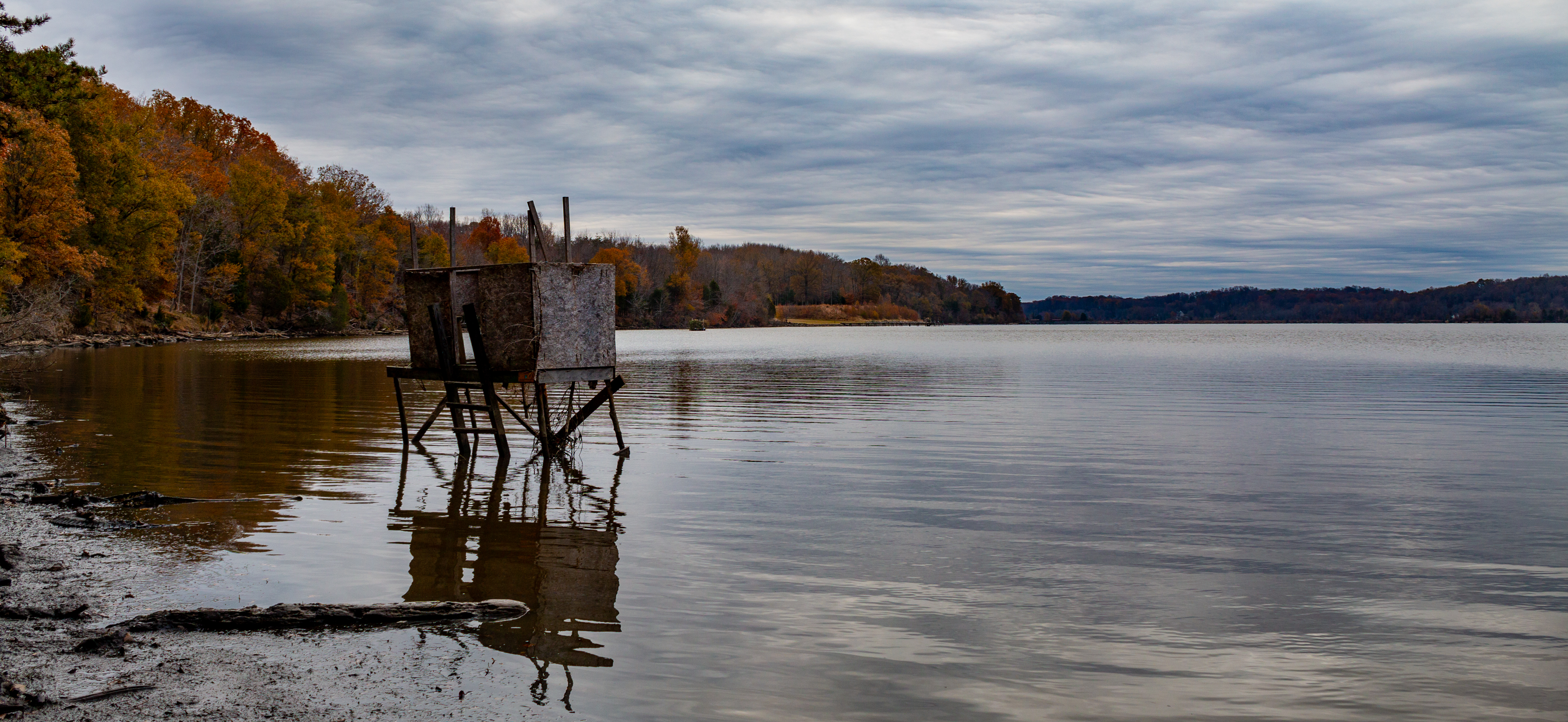
- Widewater State Park, November 2018

- Location within Virginia Location within the United States
- Location: Stafford County, Virginia
- Nearest city: Fredericksburg
- Coordinates: 38°25′37″N 77°20′6″W
- Area: 1,089 acres (440.7 ha)
- Created: 2019
- Administrator: Virginia Department of Conservation and Recreation

Widewater State Park is a state park on a 1,100 acres (450 ha) peninsula in the Potomac River in Stafford County, Virginia. It and Leesylvania State Park to the north on Occoquan Bay, and several wildlife refuges and regional parks are on the Captain John Smith Chesapeake National Historic Trail. Current facilities include a combined visitor center and staff building along Aquia Creek, as well as four picnic shelters, children's play areas and kayak launches on both sides of the peninsula and a soft boat launch and campgrounds.

== History ==
Native Americans lived, hunted and fished in the area for centuries. Captain John Smith visited the area in this first and second voyages in 1607–1609 and claimed the area for England, while using that indigenous peoples as guides and trading partners. By 1670 George Brent a lawyer who had fled the English Civil War established a plantation along Aquia Creek, which he and relatives farmed until after the American Revolutionary War, increasingly using enslaved labor. In addition to farming activities by the Brents and their successors, the area became a prominent fishery, even after silting of Aquia Harbor made loading tobacco onto overseas ships difficult. Aquia Landing (now a county park) at the peninsula's foot had become a steamship terminal by 1815. By the 1840s, it had become the terminus of the Richmond, Fredericksburg and Potomac Railroad. During the American Civil War, Aquia Landing changed hands several times, and an estimated 10,000 formerly enslaved people used it to flee north. In 1872, a reconstructed railroad bridge led to the decline of Aquia Landing and the formerly busy Brooke Road.

However, another reconstructed railroad line on the peninsula could transport fish to city markets. It became the largest fish shipping terminal on the Cheasapeake in the early 20th century until pollution and overfishing compromised the fishery so that it nearly vanished by the Great Depression. Fishing is now regulated by a joint commission. In 1903 Samuel P. Langley conducted an early flight experiment with a steam powered airplane from a houseboat offshore at Widewater. From the 1750s until the 1920s, Clifton fishery operated at Widewater, one of five or six commercial fisheries in the area which used massive seine and gill nets and other means to capture herring, shad, rockfish and even sturgeon (for caviar). In 1922, Western Marine and Salvage acquired 200 "ghost ships" (wooden steamships constructed during World War I), moved them to Widewater and attempted to strip them of metal machinery and fittings. Local outrage about the resulting pollution led to the operation's transfer across the Potomac to Mallows Bay, Maryland, where it was ended as unprofitable during World War II, despite a similar recycling attempt by Bethlehem Steel. Another attempt in the 1960s failed to start, when Congress heard testimony that the ghost fleet was providing important wildlife habitat.

== State park establishment ==
In 2006 Virginia purchased five parcels of land on either side of Brent Point Road from Dominion Resources, but the Great Recession prevented development of the property, so it was administered together with Leesylvania State Park. In 2018, after a successful bond issue, the Virginia General Assembly appropriated funds which permitted groundbreaking for entrance facilities and a visitor center. The park officially opened in 2019, and a hiking trail connects four of the five parcels, with development of the furthest parcel (at the tip of the neck, surrounded by private homes) scheduled to begin soon.

Near the Visitor Center is a historical marker honoring Palmer Hayden, a native of Widewater who moved to Washington D.C. and then New York City and became a prominent African American artist in the United States and France. He had been a parishioner at Oak Grove Baptist Church, one of the many private entities still on the peninsula. The visitor center also has an exhibit of some of his work, and occasionally offers art programs.

The Widewater Volunteer Fire Department (en route to Widewater State Park) has a historical marker honoring Kate Waller Barrett who was raised at her family's home at Clifton before becoming a prominent Virginia physician, social activist and philanthropist.

== See also ==
- List of Virginia state parks
- List of Virginia state forests
