= Wilbur C. Hall =

American politician (1892–1972)

Member of the Virginia House of Delegates from the Loudoun Counties district
- In office January 9, 1924 – December 31, 1934
- Preceded by: district reorganized
- Succeeded by: Hayward C. Thompson

Member of the U.S. House of Representatives from 's Fauquier and Loudoun Counties district
- In office January 9, 1918 – January 8, 1924
- Preceded by: John Orr Daniel
- Succeeded by: district reorganized

Personal details
- Born: Wilbur C. Hall; February 5, 1892 Mountain Gap, Loudoun County, Virginia
- Died: August 21, 1972 (aged 80) Loudoun County, Virginia
- Party: Democratic
- Spouse: Margaret Hickman
- Education: Washington and Lee University; Georgetown University School of Law

Wilbur Curtis Hall (February 5, 1892 – August 21, 1972) was a Virginia lawyer, World War I Navy veteran and Democratic politician who served in the Virginia House of Delegates (1918-1935) before becoming the 1st chairman of the Virginia Conservation and Development Commission (1935-1939).

== Early life and education ==
Hall was born to the former Annie Eliza Holiday and her husband John William Hall in a small town called Mountain Gap in Loudoun County, Virginia. Their ancestors had lived nearby for generations and the family included a younger brother, Stilson Hall (1893-1981). The boys were educated in a one-room schoolhouse (the other in the town being used by African-American students). Hall graduated from Leesburg High School, then Washington and Lee University. He later received an LL.B. from Georgetown University Law School.

== Career ==
Hall practiced law in Loudoun and surrounding counties. During World War I he enlisted in the U.S. Navy. In 1918 voters from Loudoun and nearby Fauquier counties elected him to represent them (part-time) in the Virginia House of Delegates, and re-elected him many times, although in 1924 (after his third term and reorganization based on the 1920 census) the district split, so Hall came to represent Loudoun County and John T. Ramey represented Fauquier County to the south. Hall also participated in various local civic organizations, including the Episcopal Church, Rotary Club, Masons, Odd Fellows, Pi Gamma Mu and Phi Beta Kappa.

In early 1935 Hall resigned his legislative position in order to accept an appointment by Governor George Peery to the newly reorganized Virginia Conservation Commission, the chairman of the previous entity, William E. Carson having resigned effective January 1, 1935. Banker Hayward C. Thompson succeeded to as Loudoun's state delegate. Hall served as the Commission's chairman for four years, until a new governor took office.

As Carson's successor (and with Governor Peery's consent), Hall initiated evictions of remaining elderly residents from Shenandoah National Park, which President Franklin D. Roosevelt dedicated on July 3, 1936. As of April 1940, after Hall's tenure, 19 families remained within the park boundaries, the last dying in 1979 at age 92.

== Personal life ==
Hall married Margaret Hickman (1897-1963) late in life, and the couple lived on South Wirt Street in Leesburg, but had no children. Through the 1940 census, Hall lived with his parents (until their deaths) and his brother (who also married late and moved to Georgia).

== Death and legacy ==
Hall died in Loudoun County in 1972, and is buried at Union Cemetery in Leesburg. The Thomas Balch library in Leesburg holds his papers. The Washington and Lee University Law School Library (which had burned in December 1934) has since 1972 been named in his honor, recognizing his donation to establish an audiovisual center. Oatlands Historic House & Gardens occasionally conducts tours of the remaining one-room schoolhouse he had purchased in 1953, and which is now the only building remaining of the former town.
