= Piney Run (Virginia) =

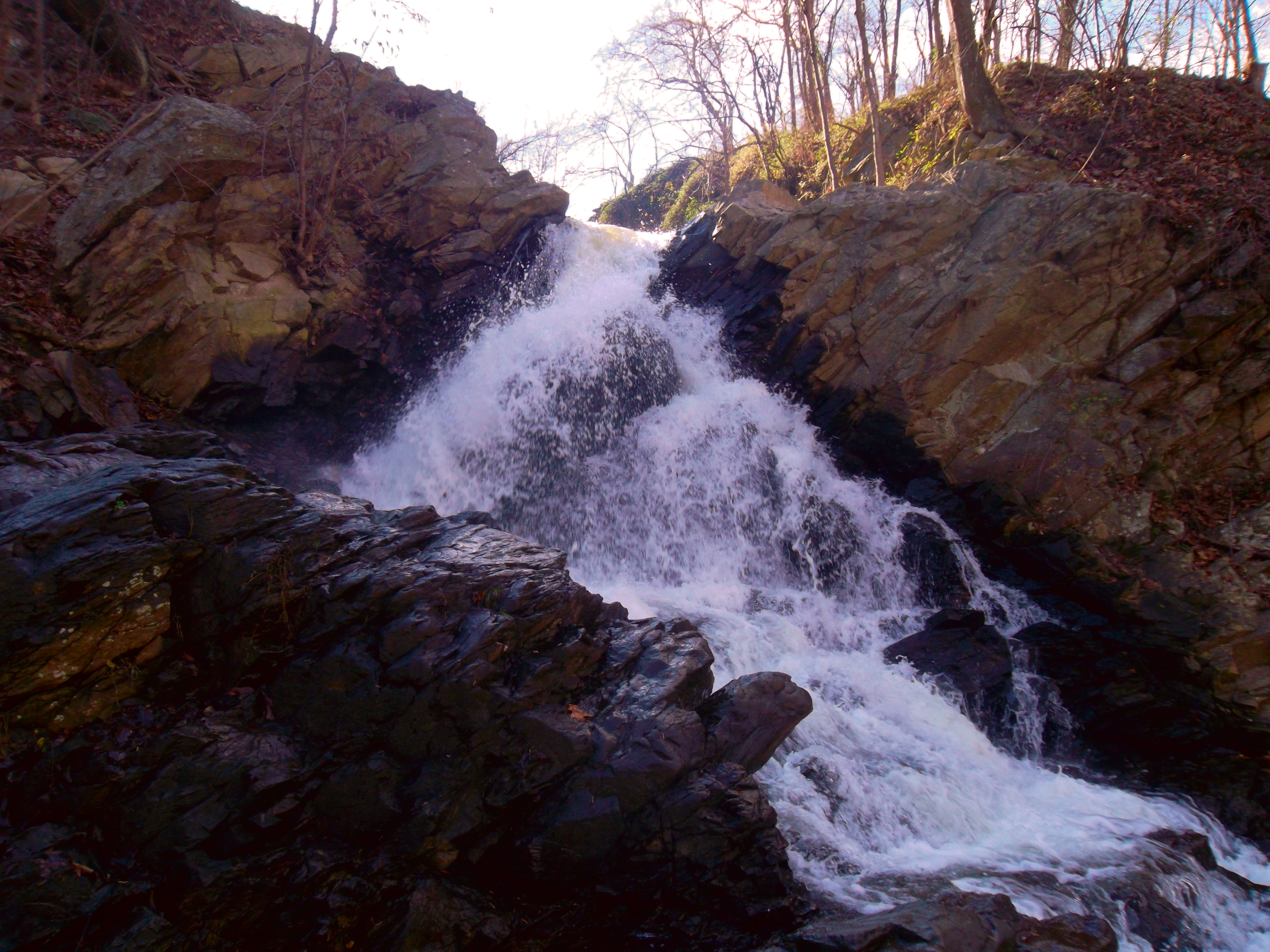
- Falls of Piney Run

Location
- Country: United States
- State: Virginia
- Region: Loudoun County

Physical characteristics
- Source
  - location: Neersville
  - coordinates: 39.24°N 77.74°W
  - elevation: 650 ft (200 m)
- Mouth: Potomac River
  - location: Loudoun Heights
  - coordinates: 39.32°N 77.71°W
  - elevation: 240 ft (73 m)
- Length: 9 mi (14 km)
- Basin size: 15.2 mi^{2} (39 km^{2})

Basin features
- Tributaries
  - left: Sweet Run

Piney Run is a tributary of the Potomac River in Loudoun County, Virginia. The creek is the principal drainage of the upper Between the Hills valley in northwestern Loudoun County.

The headwaters of the creek are located approximately 1.75 miles (2.82 km) south of Neersville, Virginia, just west of State Route 671 (Harpers Ferry Road). Just prior to an impoundment, 5 miles (8.0 km) from its headwaters in Sweet Run State Park, the creek is joined by its only named tributary branch, Sweet Run. From the impoundment, the creek flows 2 miles (3.2 km), to the crossing by State Route 671, whereupon the creek cuts a deep gorge, falling 150 feet (46 m) over its last 2 miles (3.2 km). Just prior to its confluence with the Potomac below the White Horse Rapids, 4,500 feet (1,400 m) down river from the confluence with the Shenandoah River, the creek passes through a culvert under U.S. Route 340 and then cascades approximately 20 feet (6.1 m) over a waterfall, the only in Loudoun County.

== See also ==
- List of rivers of Virginia
