= Sweet Run State Park =

State park in Virginia, United States

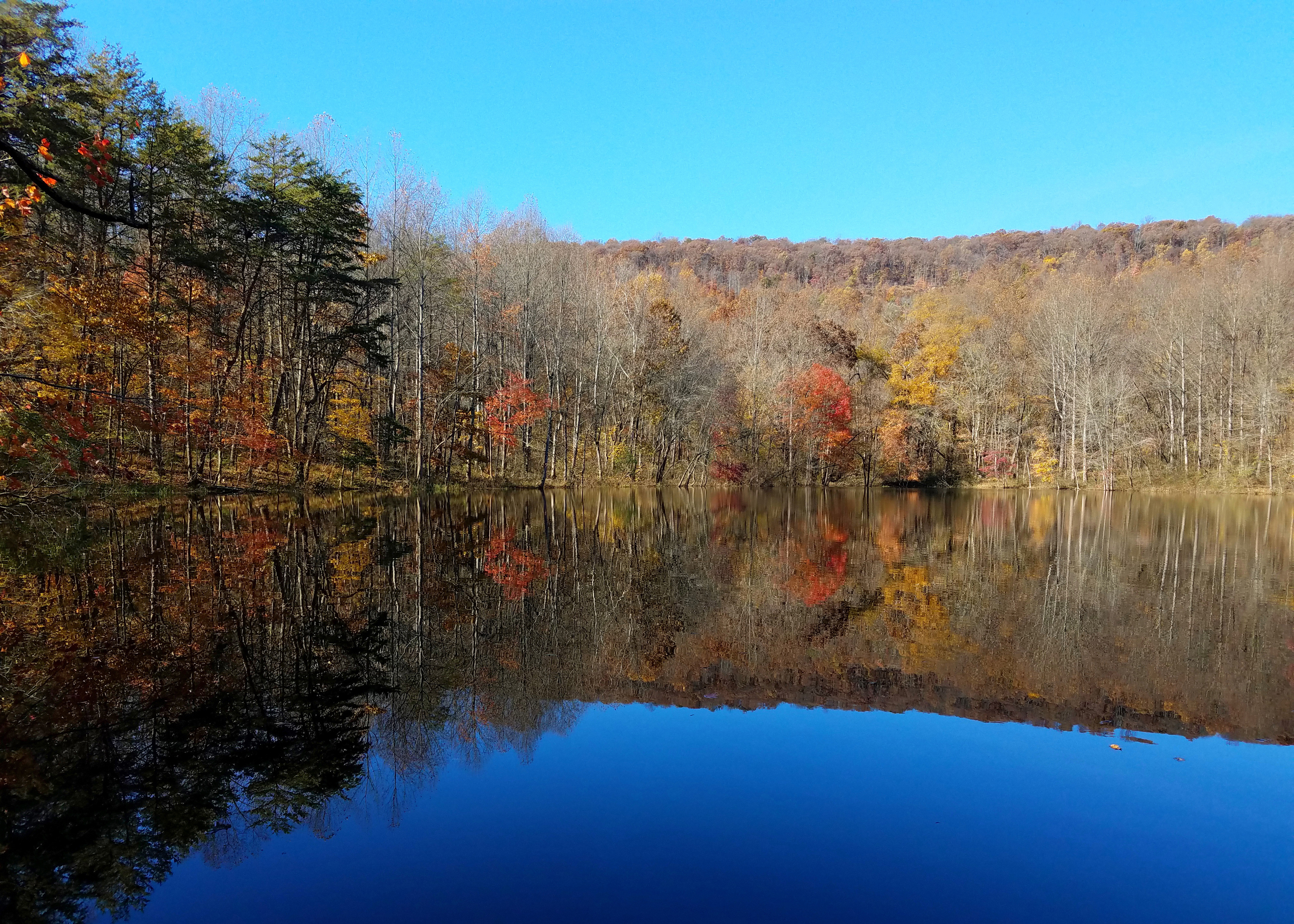
- Gordon Pond in autumn

- Location within Northern Virginia Location within Virginia Location within the United States
- Location: Loudoun County, Virginia
- Nearest city: Hillsboro, Virginia
- Coordinates: 39°17′37″N 77°43′30″W
- Area: 884 acres (358 ha)
- Established: 2023
- Governing body: Virginia Department of Conservation and Recreation

Sweet Run State Park is a state park in northern Loudoun County, Virginia, near Harper's Ferry, West Virginia. The park was dedicated on October 6, 2023 by Governor Glenn Youngkin. The 884-acre (3.58 km^{2}) park is the first state park in Loudoun County and the 42nd park to be established under the Virginia state park system. Situated between Short Hill Mountain and the Blue Ridge Mountains, the park is located in a valley known to locals as Between the Hills.

== History ==
In the late 18th century, settlers developed a community around the area known as the "Waters” at the confluence of Piney and Sweet Runs. The settlers raised cash crops such as wheat and corn, and harvested lumber to create charcoal to supply the iron forges in Harper's Ferry. Remnants of this activity are still visible in the park, where the remains of old buildings, charcoal hearths, and road networks can still be found.

During the Civil War, the area was the scene of frequent clashes between Union cavalry and the 43rd Virginia Cavalry Battalion commanded by Col. John S. Mosby. Between 1861 and 1865, control of Harper's Ferry changed hands fourteen times. The area saw a new state created when West Virginia became the 35th state in the Union on June 20, 1863.

After the Civil War and with the advent of large-scale agriculture, the rural population of the area declined and those who remained shifted primarily to dairy, livestock, and poultry operations to supply local cities. As the area shifted away from agriculture, developers began to eye the area for a golf course community.

In 1999, the Robert and Dee Leggett Foundation purchased land in this area and named it the Blue Ridge Center for Ecological Stewardship (BRCES). The center focused on sustainability, managing natural and cultural resources, and promoting open access to nature for the public. The foundation donated 604 acres to the Virginia Department of Conservation and Recreation in 2016, and Loudoun County purchased an additional 280 acres in 2018 which they transferred in 2022. The land officially became a state park on May 26, 2023 and BRCES was renamed to the Between the Hills Conservancy, which will support the park.

== Features ==
Hiker walking the Upper Sweet Run Trail

The park has approximately 11 miles of hiking trails and nine miles of equestrian trails, including access to the Appalachian Trail. The terrain includes mature forest, meadows, and mountain slopes. Wood turtles, an endangered species native to Virginia, as well as bald eagles, black bears, and herons can be found in the park. Passive recreation activities such as hiking, fishing, and bird watching and horseback riding are available.

As of January 2025, there are no facilities open, but a visitor center is under development.

== See also ==
- List of Virginia state parks
