= Falling Spring Falls State Park =

State park in Virginia, United States

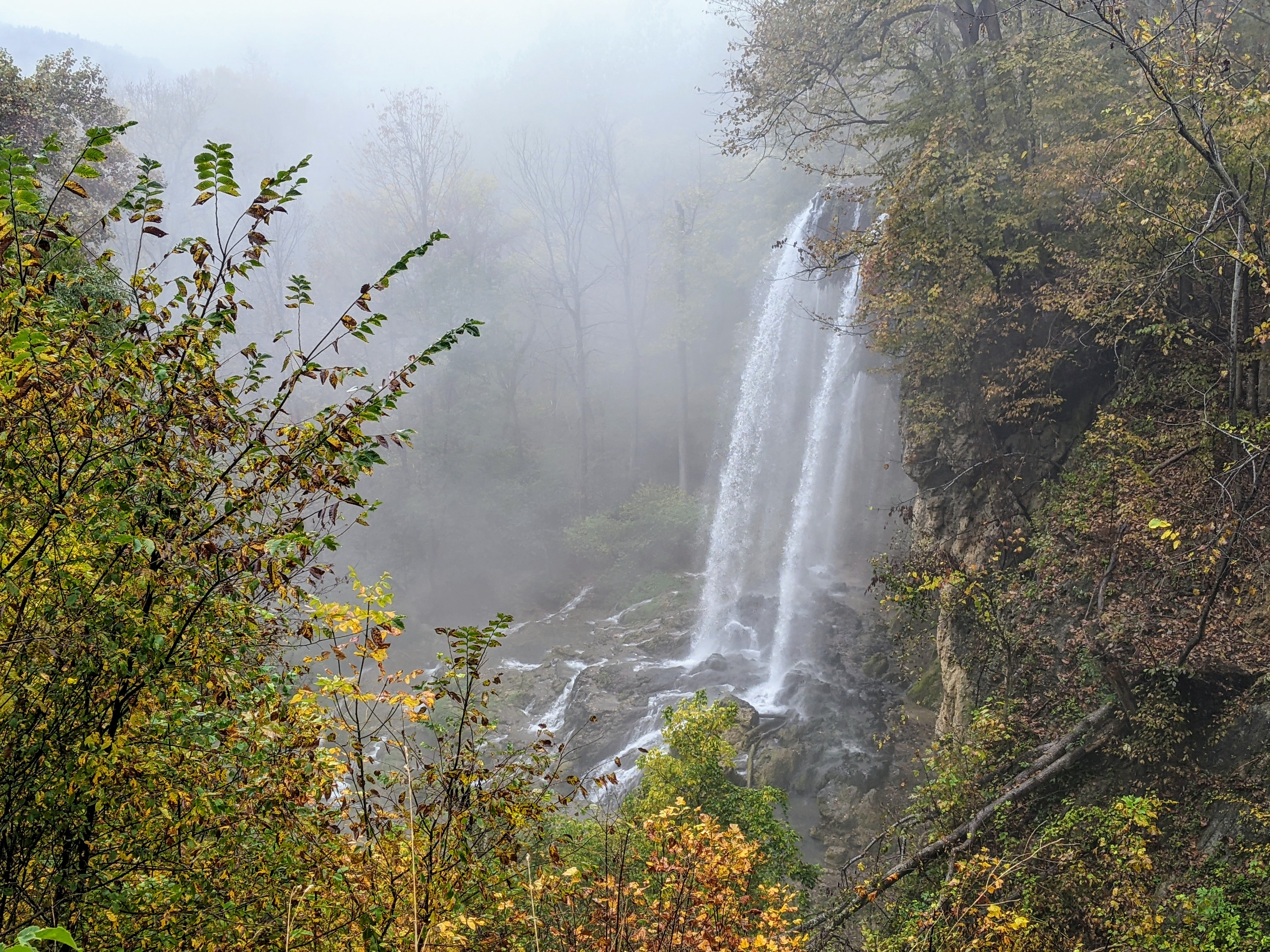
- Falling Spring Falls

- Location within Virginia Location within the United States
- Location: Alleghany County, Virginia
- Nearest city: Covington
- Coordinates: 37°52′04″N 79°56′52″W
- Area: 19 acres (7.7 ha)
- Established: 2004
- Governing body: Virginia Department of Conservation and Recreation

Falling Spring Falls State Park is a state park in Alleghany County, Virginia, five miles north of the town of Covington in the Alleghany Highlands region. The 19-acre (0.077 km^{2}) park opened in 2004. The centerpiece of the park is an 80 ft (24 m) waterfall. The park, one of the smallest in the Virginia State Park system, is maintained by nearby Douthat State Park.

== History ==
King George III of Great Britain granted 82 acres, including the falls, to Gabriel Jones in 1771. In 1780, Governor Thomas Jefferson, who had once surveyed the falls and mentioned them in his book, Notes on the State of Virginia, deeded the property to Major Thomas Massie.

During the first half of the 20th century, the falls were used to generate electricity to power the crushing of travertine and limestone, which were used in agriculture. Mining operations necessitated that the falls, which were originally 200 ft (61 m), be shortened to the present height.

In 2004, the falls and surrounding land was donated to the Virginia Department of Conservation and Recreation for perpetual preservation.

== Features ==
There is a viewing area for the falls that is a short walk from the parking lot. Going past the fenced off viewing area is strictly prohibited and could result in a fine.

== See also ==
- Douthat State Park
- List of Virginia state parks
