= Staunton River State Park =

State park in Virginia, U.S.

Staunton River State Park, Virginia, USA
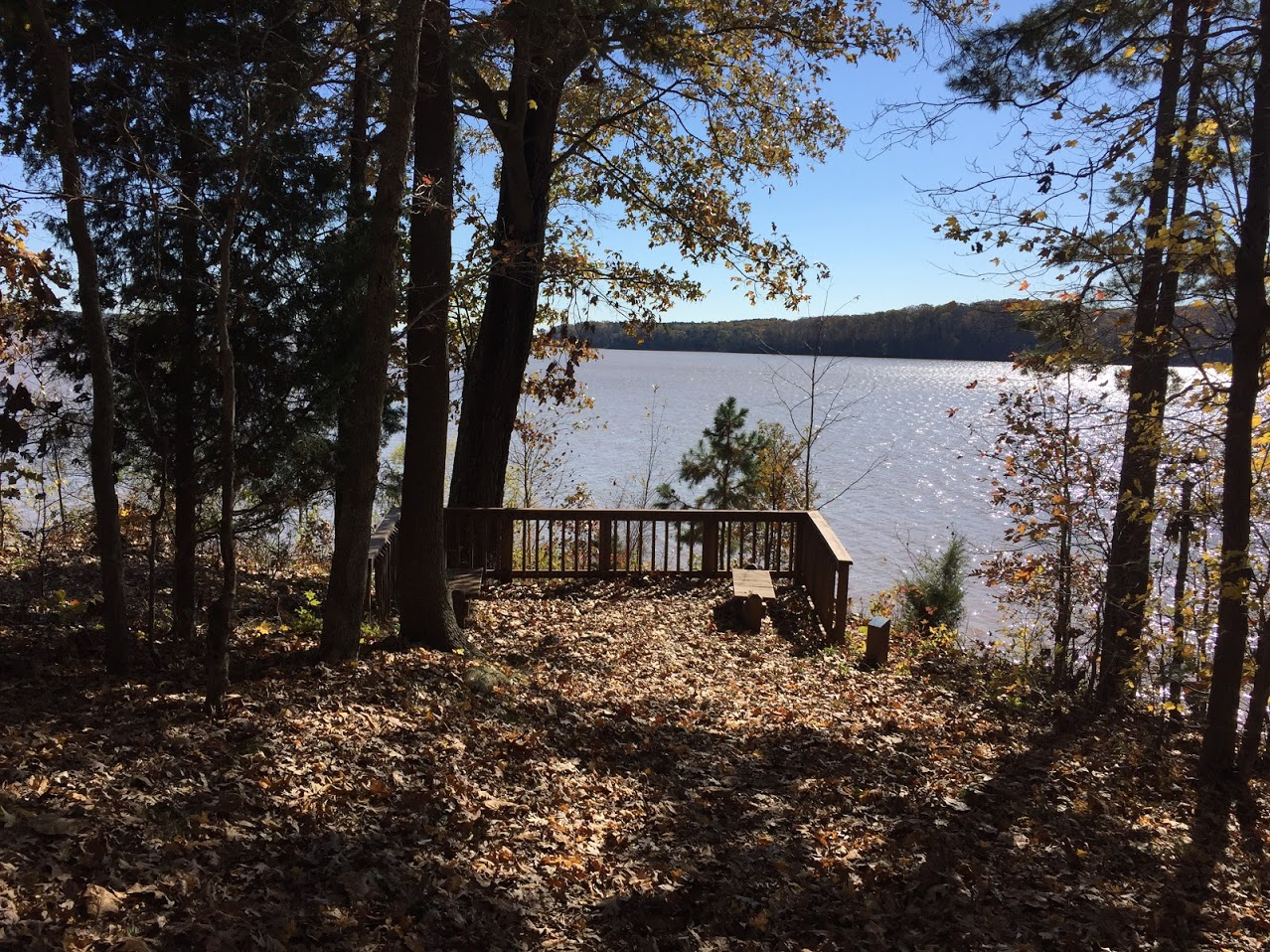
- Staunton River State Park

- Location within Virginia Location within the United States
- Location: 1170 Staunton Trail, Scottsburg, VA 24589
- Coordinates: 36°41′45.8″N 78°41′7″W
- Area: 2,336 acres (945 ha)
- Governing body: Virginia Department of Conservation and Recreation

Staunton River State Park is a state park in Virginia. One of the Commonwealth's original state parks, built by the Civilian Conservation Corps and opening in 1936, it is located along the Staunton River near Scottsburg, Virginia. It is an International Dark Sky Park.

== Location ==
Construction of the park was begun (at the confluence of the Staunton and Dan Rivers) beginning in 1933; Buggs Island Lake was formed in the early 1950s. These two rivers form the Roanoke River basin, and the section of land starting at the park and continuing downstream beside the Roanoke River was known as the Roanoke River valley.

== Background ==
The park is named for the Staunton River, which forms part of its boundary. Today the river is also known as the Roanoke River; however, locally it is still called the Staunton River (pronounced "Stanton"). The Staunton River is said to be named for Captain Henry Staunton; before the American Revolution, Staunton commanded a company of soldiers organized to patrol the river valley from the Blue Ridge Mountains to the mouth of the Dan River. Their duty was to protect Virginian settlers from attacks by Native Americans. This section of the river became known as "Captain Staunton's River" and, later, the Staunton River.

== History ==
- Staunton River State Park Historic District
- U.S. National Register of Historic Places
- U.S. Historic district
- Virginia Landmarks Register
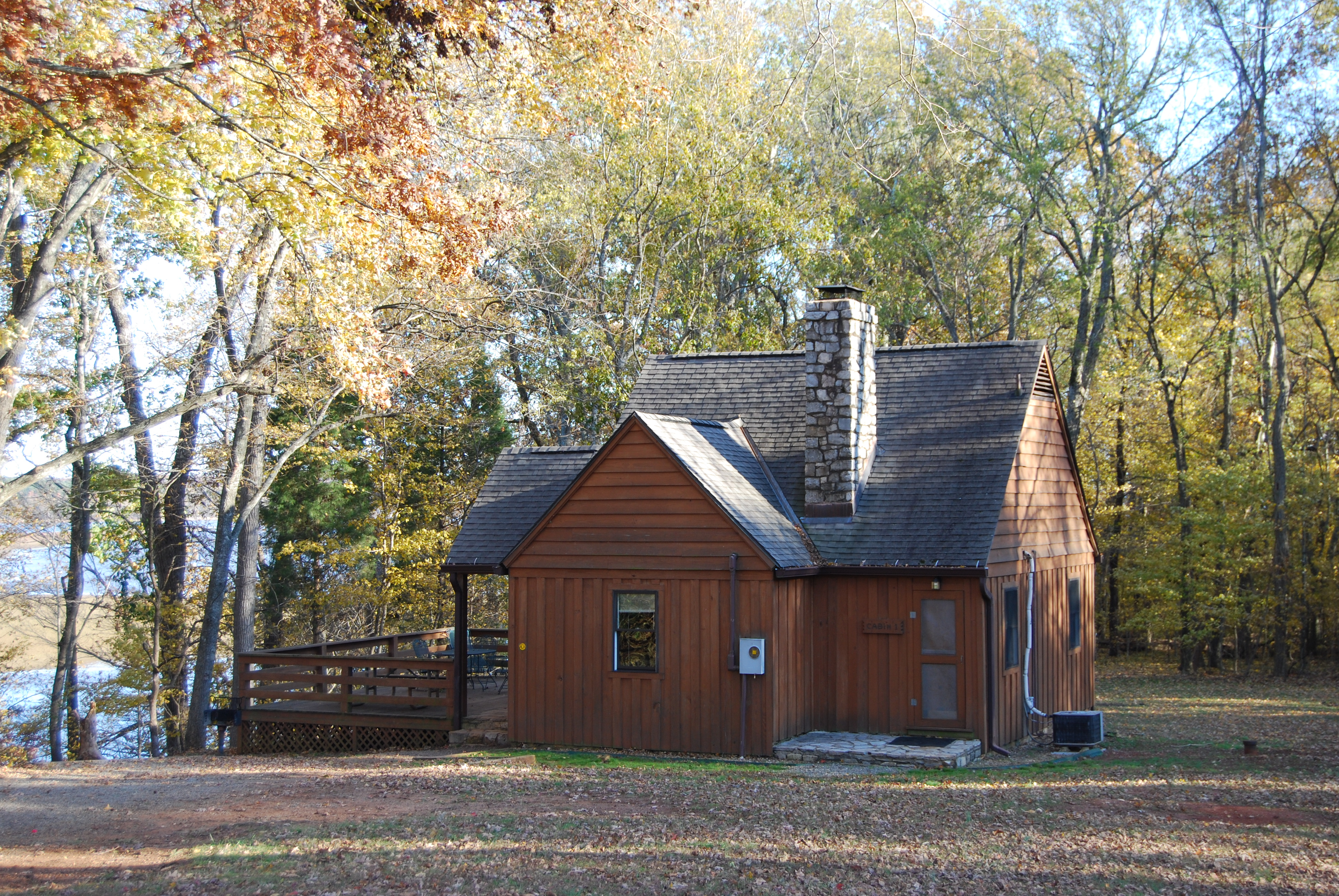
- A cabin in the park

- Location within Virginia Location within the United States
- Nearest city: Scottsburg, Virginia
- Area: 1,597 acres (646 ha)
- Built: 1933
- Architectural style: Late 19th And Early 20th Century American Movements, Modern Movement
- NRHP reference No.: 07000402
- VLR No.: 041-0100

Significant dates
- Added to NRHP: May 4, 2007
- Designated VLR: June 8, 2006

The first Europeans who settled were small farmers. With the introduction of tobacco as a cash crop, area plantations began to expand. Many plantations were located along the Staunton River above the park. Red Hill (the last home of Patrick Henry) and Roanoke Plantation (home of Captain Adam Clement and his son John Marshall Clemens, father of Samuel Clemens—Mark Twain) are two of the better-known plantations. The Fork Plantation was located on what is now Staunton River State Park. H. E. Coleman owned the plantation, and in 1839 the ownership was transferred to Richard Logan. The plantation contained all of the land located on the fork; one tract covered more than 1,000 acres (4.0 km^{2}). At this time, there was also a Fork Mission located near the present town of Scottsburg.

With the plantations there was a need for transportation, and the Staunton and Dan Rivers permitted water-borne commerce. A fleet of freight bateaux (flatboats) operated upstream from Brookneal and downstream to Clarksville and Gaston, North Carolina. Samuel Pannilla owned these flatboats, which bypassed the falls through channels walled in with stone masonry (forming a canal). These boats stopped not only stopped at Pannilla's plantation, but at landings up and down the river to take on and deliver freight for other shippers. This system lasted until the Civil War, becoming popular again in 1869 until the advent of the railroads. Charles Bruce of Staunton Hill placed two small steamboats in operation on the Staunton River, but most forms of water travel ended with the coming of the railroads.

Matt Haskins was a legendary strong man of the Staunton River bateaux men. Haskins, an African American who lived in Randolph, was known up and down the river. It was said that he could lift a 200-pound (91 kg) sack of fertilizer with his teeth and pick up a barrel full of liquor in his hands and drink out of the bunghole.

After the war, the Fork Plantation fell into ruins. Tenant farmers took over the land of the plantation. The land near the rivers was rich and fertile, and crops grew well; each year, 500–600 pounds (230–270 kg) of corn was harvested. Tobacco was the main crop, and large quantities were grown. One landlord usually had around 50 tenant farmers and their families living in what is today the park.

In 1899, there was a Christian social colony from Wisconsin at the fork. The colony was an experimental Utopian commune. On August 8, 1899 J. C. Zimmerman purchased a tract of land about two miles (3 km) above the confluence of the Dan and Staunton Rivers. The parcel covered 1,426 acres (5.77 km^{2}). Zimmerman headed the group of nine or ten families who established the colony. Buildings were arranged in a semicircle, with a communal kitchen and dining room in the center. However, the people knew little of the area's farming practices; the colony began to fail, and the group soon left.

In 1933, the Commission of Conservation and Development of the Commonwealth of Virginia bought 1,196 acres (4.84 km^{2}) of land from J. W. Johnson, his wife Mary C. Johnson, J. E. Johnson and his wife Elizabeth Johnson. Other land for the park was also purchased. From 1933 to 1935, a Civilian Conservation Corps (CCC) company was established at "the fork". Most of the buildings and facilities of the park were built by the CCC.

In 1936, Staunton River State Park was opened to the public as one of the original six state parks. Covering 1,776 acres (7.19 km^{2}), it provided recreation for the people of south-central Virginia. In 1952, with the completion of the John H. Kerr Dam and the formation of Buggs Island Lake, part of the park was flooded. The park offers many forms of recreation: a pool, tennis courts, a volleyball court, concession stand, picnic areas, children's playground, boat-launching facility, campground, cabins and nature trails. Located in a rural area, much of the original beauty of "Captain Staunton's River" still exists.

The Staunton River State Park Historic District was listed on the National Register of Historic Places in 2007. The national historic district encompasses 14 contributing buildings, 5 contributing sites, and 5 contributing structures. They include the District Manager's House and garage (1934), restaurant / visitor center (1935–1936), pool area including the bath house and concession building, picnic areas including shelters and latrines (1933–1934, 1934–1935), the cabin area and cabins (1934–1936), campground (1940), and tennis courts (1937).

== See also ==
- List of Virginia state parks
- List of Virginia state forests
