= Hungry Mother State Park =

State park in Virginia, United States

- Hungry Mother State Park Historic District
- U.S. National Register of Historic Places
- U.S. Historic district
- Virginia Landmarks Register
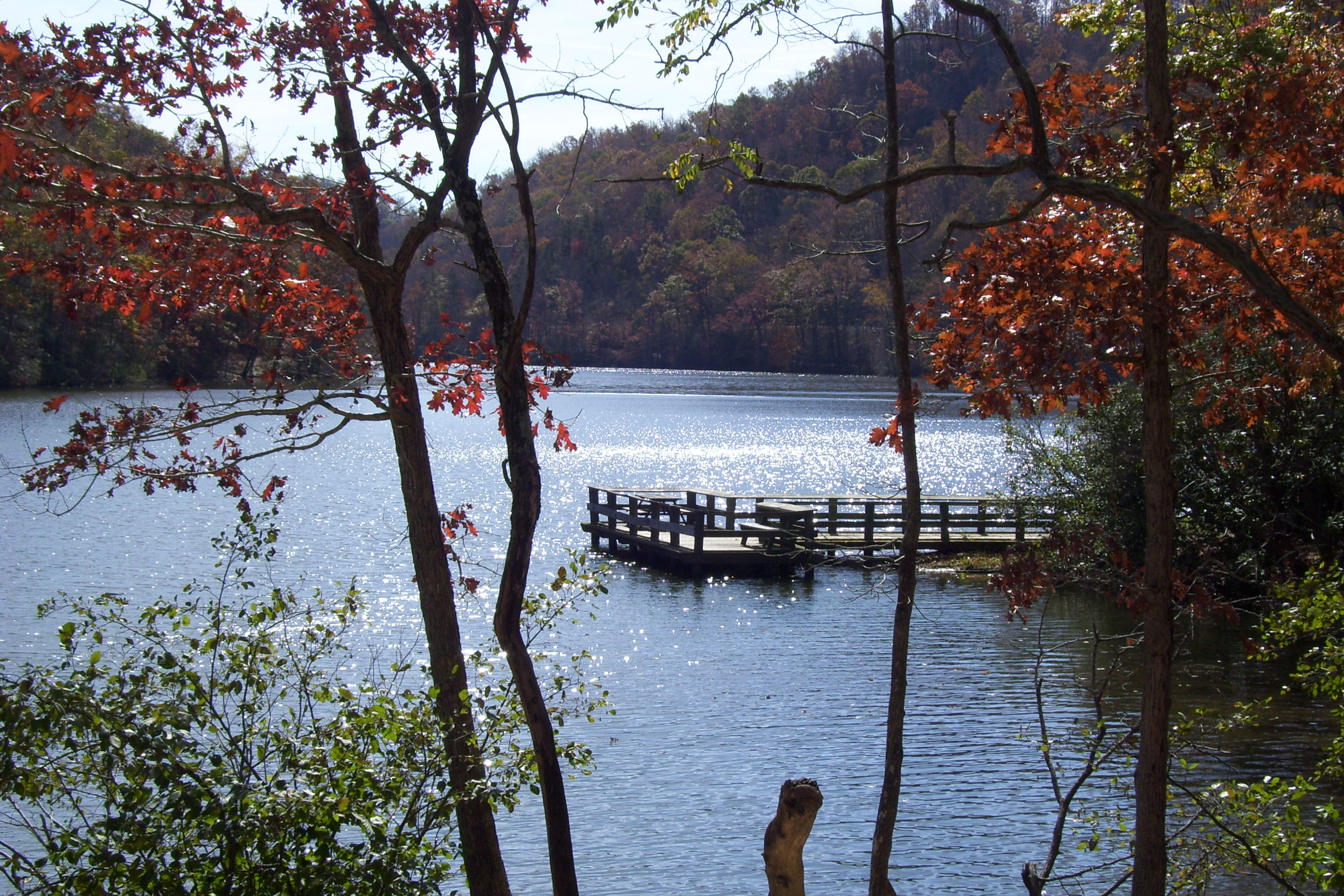
- A lake in the Park

- Location within Virginia Location within the United States
- Nearest city: Marion, Virginia
- Coordinates: 36°52′52″N 81°32′05″W
- Area: 3,334 acres (1,349 ha)
- Built: 1933
- Architect: Myers, E.L.; et al.
- Architectural style: Late 19th and early 20th century American movements, modern movement
- NRHP reference No.: 07000303
- VLR No.: 086-0015

Significant dates
- Added to NRHP: April 12, 2007
- Designated VLR: June 8, 2006

Hungry Mother State Park is a state park in southwestern Virginia. The park's main feature is a 108-acre lake with a sandy beach. Opened in June 1936, Hungry Mother State Park is one of the six original Virginia state parks built by the Civilian Conservation Corps in the early-mid 1930s.

== History ==
Much of the land for Hungry Mother State Park was donated by local landowners to develop a new state park in Smyth County on Hungry Mother Creek. The original grounds, trails and campsites of the park were built CCC, like the other five Virginia state parks that opened on 15 June 1936. Governor George C. Peery attended the opening ceremonies on June 15 at Hungry Mother, giving a speech about the benefits of the new state park system.

The park was added to the National Register of Historic Places in 2007.

== Origins of name ==
It has frequently been noted on lists of unusual place names. A legend states that when the Native Americans destroyed several settlements on the New River south of the park, Molly Marley and her small child were among the survivors taken to the raiders’ base north of the park. They eventually escaped, wandering through the wilderness eating berries. Molly finally collapsed, and her child wandered down a creek. Upon finding help, the only words the child could utter were "Hungry Mother." When the search party arrived at the foot of the mountain where Molly had collapsed, they found the child's mother dead. Today, that mountain is Molly's Knob (3,270 feet), and the stream is Hungry Mother Creek.

== See also ==
- List of Virginia state parks
