= Douthat State Park =

Park in the Appalachians, United States

- IUCN category V (protected landscape/seascape)
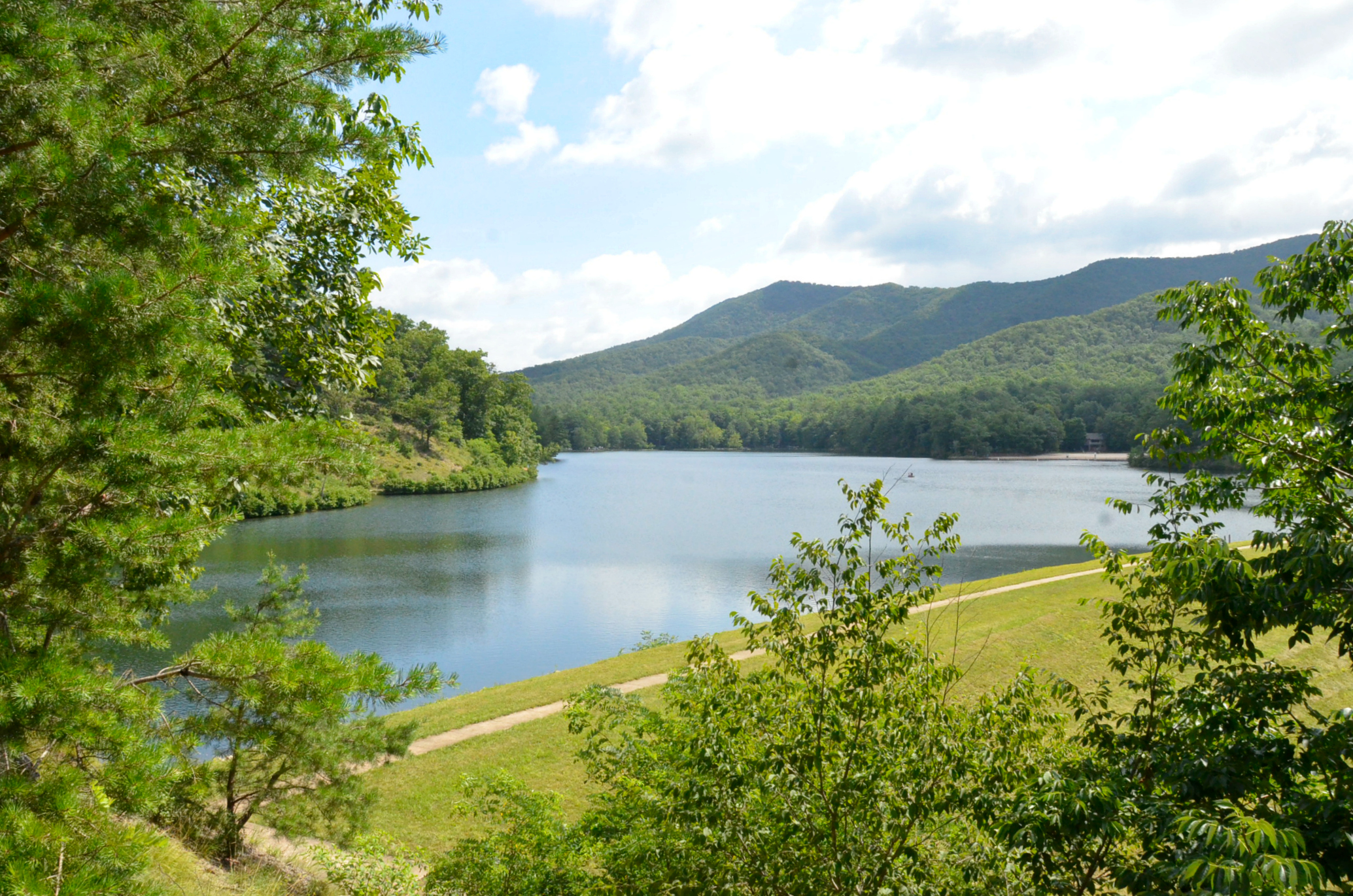
- Douthat Lake in July 2016

- Location within Virginia Location within the United States
- Location: Bath / Alleghany counties, Virginia, USA
- Nearest city: Clifton Forge, Virginia
- Coordinates: 37°53′51″N 79°48′40″W
- Area: 4,545 acres (18 km^{2})
- Established: June 15, 1936
- Governing body: Virginia Department of Conservation and Recreation
- Douthat State Park Historic District
- U.S. National Register of Historic Places
- U.S. Historic district
- Virginia Landmarks Register
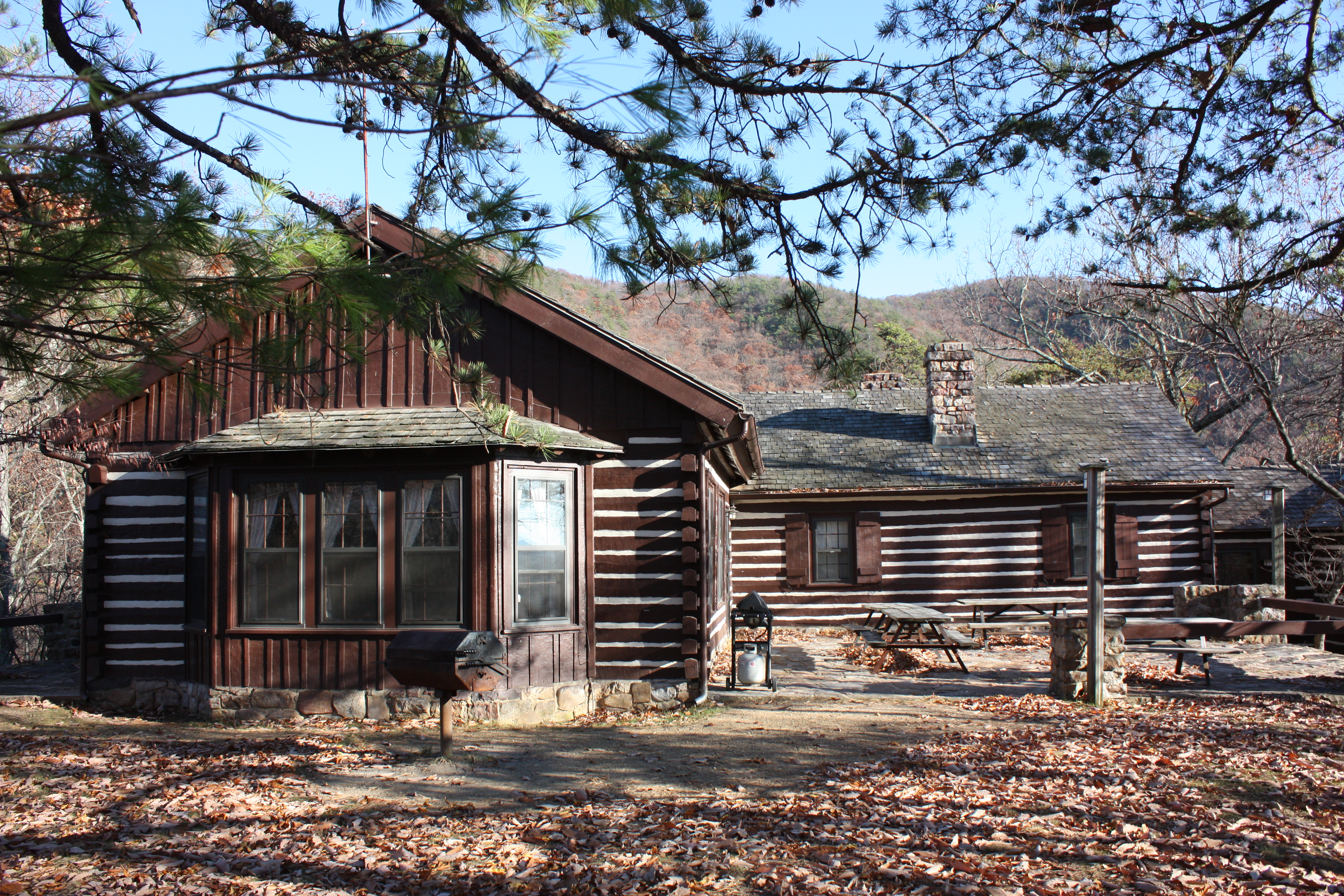
- Douthat Lodge in January 2000

- Location within Virginia Location within the United States
- Nearest city: Clifton Forge, Virginia
- Area: 4,493 acres (1,818 ha)
- Built: 1933
- Built by: Civilian Conservation Corps
- Architectural style: Log cabin style
- NRHP reference No.: 86002183
- VLR No.: 008-0136, 134–5088

Significant dates
- Added to NRHP: September 20, 1986
- Designated VLR: June 17, 1986

Douthat State Park is a state park located in the Allegheny Mountains in Virginia. It is in Bath County and Alleghany County. The park is 4,545 acres (18 km^{2}) total with a 50-acre (20 ha) lake, making it the third-largest Virginia state park after Pocahontas State Park and Fairy Stone State Park. It is one of the six original Virginia state parks, built in the 1930s by the Civilian Conservation Corps.

== History ==
=== 20th century ===
The Douthat Land Company, a group of businessmen headed by Robert Douthat, donated the first portion of land — 1,920 acres (780 ha). (Douthat State Park History: A Research Paper) In 1933, the Virginia General Assembly allotted $50,000 for the purchase of land for state parks, and the remainder of the present-day park was purchased with this money.

Approximately 600 men from the Civilian Conservation Corps developed and constructed the majority of the modern-day park between 1933 and 1942. The CCC modeled its hierarchy and organization after the US Army, and assigned three companies to construct Douthat State Park.

Each of the three CCC companies held a particular mission and specialty. Company 1836 conducted forestry work and trail construction, while Company 1374 constructed the original park office, shelters, beach complex building, and the initial 25 cabins. Company 1373 built the dam and spillway, using Wilson Creek- the only natural body of water in the area- to create Douthat Lake. Wilson Creek still flows down from the mountains and into Douthat Lake beside Lakeside Campground, and continues downstream of the dam's spillway.

Exactly three years after CCC work crews started on June 15, 1933, Douthat State Park opened on June 15, 1936 alongside the other five original state parks in Virginia, all built with the men and resources of the Civilian Conservation Corps. Further work continued into 1941 and concluded in 1942, after the United States entered World War II on December 7, 1941.

For the first 29 years Douthat was operational, Virginia state law barred non-whites from visiting Douthat State Park. In response, the Clifton Forge chapter of the NAACP lobbied for an alternate site for black citizens to visit, and the 133-acre Green Pastures Recreation Area was opened in 1940. Green Pastures became racially integrated in 1950- a rarity in the still heavily-segregated South.

With the passage of the Civil Rights Act of 1964, federal law no longer supported de jure racial segregation of public parks. The Virginia state government remained in the hands of many opposed to integration, but the central force that had coordinated such efforts- the political machine led by and named for powerful U.S. Senator and former Virginia governor Harry F. Byrd- was faltering by the mid-1960s, and the Virginia state park system ceased imposing racial segregation in 1965.

50 years after it first opened to visitors, Douthat State Park was added to the Virginia Landmark Register on June 17, 1986, and to the National Register of Historic Places three months later, on September 20, 1986.

=== 21st century ===
Whispering Pines Campground, a newer campground designed specifically to accommodate RV's, added 52 acres to the park after the private RV campground formerly occupying the land closed and sold the land to the Virginia Department of Conservation & Recreation in 2007.

The 2010s brought a major renovation to the park's three original campgrounds- Lakeside, Beaver Dam, and White Oak- with the addition of electricity to all campsites, which had previously only guaranteed water at all sites. In the 2020s, Virginia DCR added public-access wifi to the park office, beach complex, and the renovated Lakeside Campground bathhouse.

Green Pastures Recreation Area closed in 2017, but was reopened following community advocacy and NAACP support, and is today maintained by Douthat State Park staff.

== Attractions ==
- Camping: Four campgrounds- Lakeside, Beaver Dam, White Oak, and Whispering Pines, offer numerous sites for visitors, with each supported by a Camp Host, who resides there as a park volunteer.
- Lodging: Douthat offers 33 cabins for rent to visitors, mostly one or two-bedrooms, all fully electrified and climate-controlled. Two lodges (Douthat and Creasey) offer accommodations for larger gatherings.
- Mountain biking: Douthat State Park has become a premier mountain biking destination. Twenty-four of the twenty-six trails at Douthat are open to biking. The park has been heralded as the best mountain biking destination on the East Coast. By spring 2009, almost all of the 45 miles of 70-year-old Civilian Conservation Corps trail at Douthat will be restored to its original condition with sustainable trail design techniques integrated to maintain a unique mountain biking experience.
- Fishing: Douthat allows trout fishing in its stocked lake with a valid Virginia Fishing License and a daily permit.
- Boating: A boat ramp launch is available April through October. Jonboats (including those with electric motors), canoes, paddleboats, hydrocycle and funyaks (similar to kayaks) are available for rental. No gasoline-powered boats are allowed on the lake.
- Hiking: Over 43 miles (69 km) of varied difficulty trails are available, many of them created originally by the Civilian Conservation Corps. Horseback riding at the park is restricted to several trails on the Western side of the park and mountain biking is permitted on nearly all of the trails.
- Swimming: The beach area of the lake is available from Memorial Day through Labor Day.
- Restaurant/store: The Lakeview Grill & Camp Store operates in the original CCC building that operated for many years as the Lakeview Restaurant and adjacent Camp Store.
- Picnicking: There are three picnic areas with shelters that can be reserved for a group.
- Hunting: Hunting is allowed by reservation with the appropriate permits.

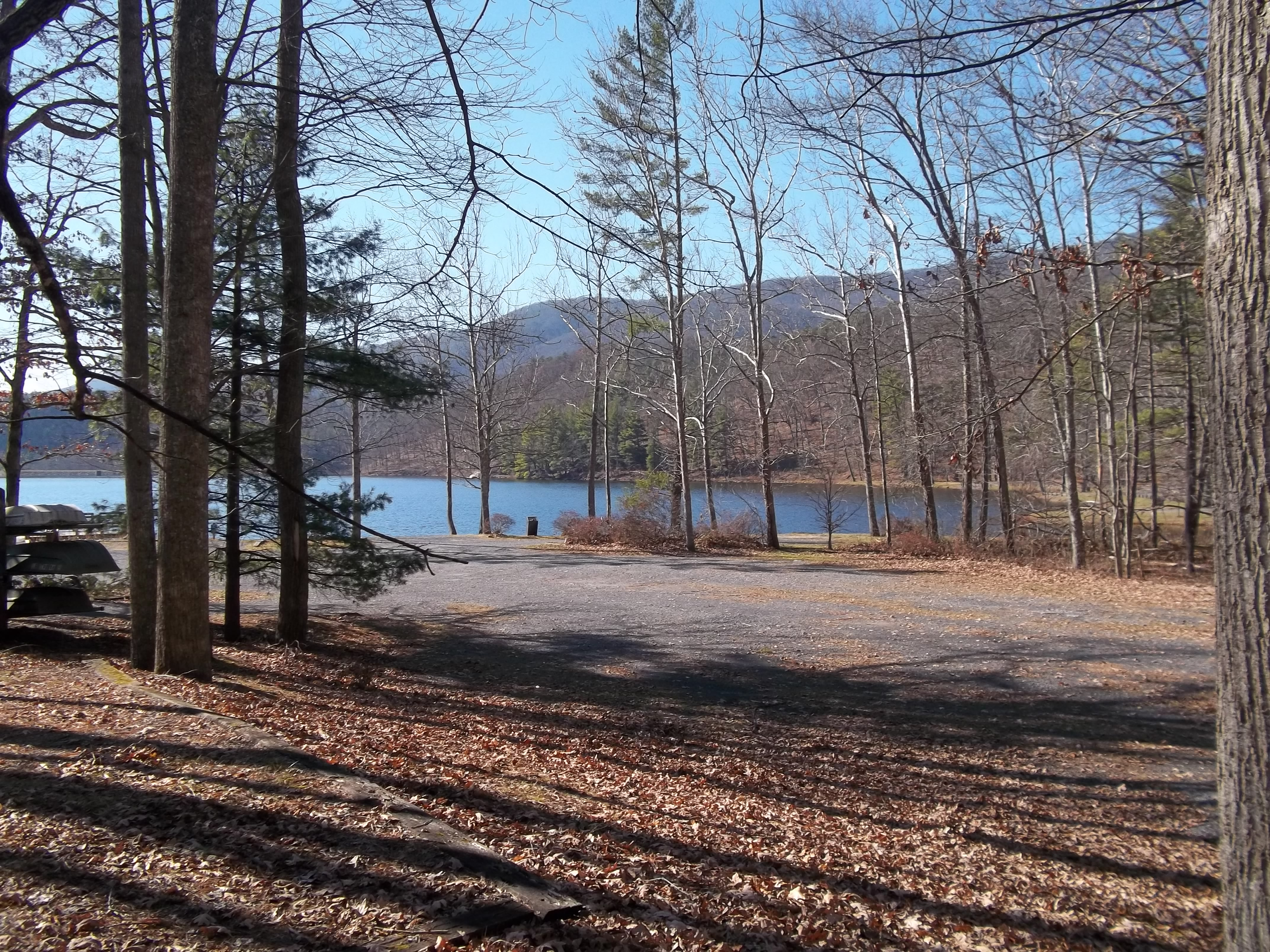
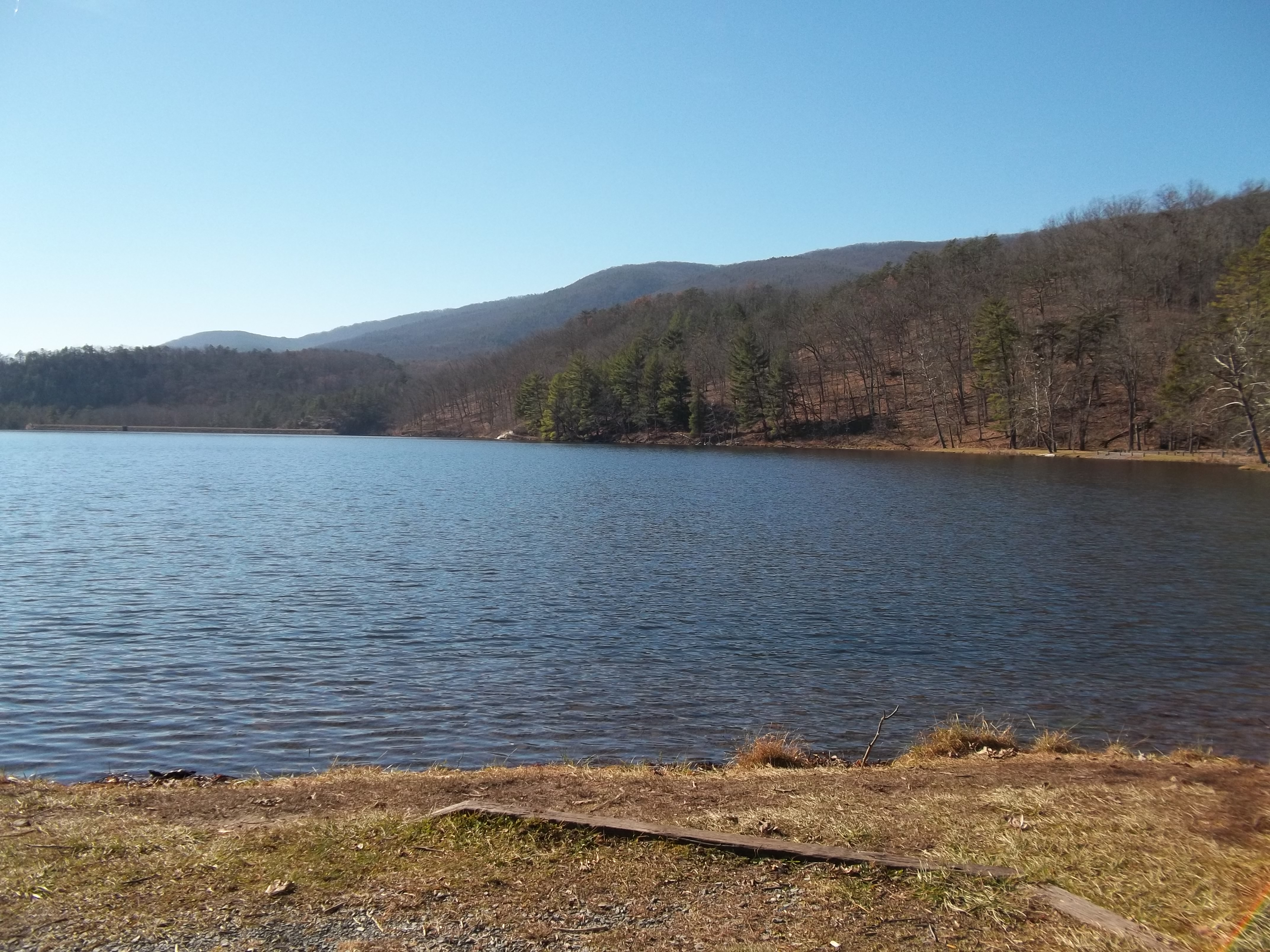
Views of the lake from boat launch area

== Awards and recognitions ==
- 1986 – Douthat recognized as a national historic district
- 1998 – Virginia Lakes and Watersheds Association Award for Best Operated and Maintained Dam
- 1999 – Centennial Medallion from the American Society of Landscape Architects
- 1999 – Named one of Outside Family Vacation Guide's top ten state parks

== See also ==
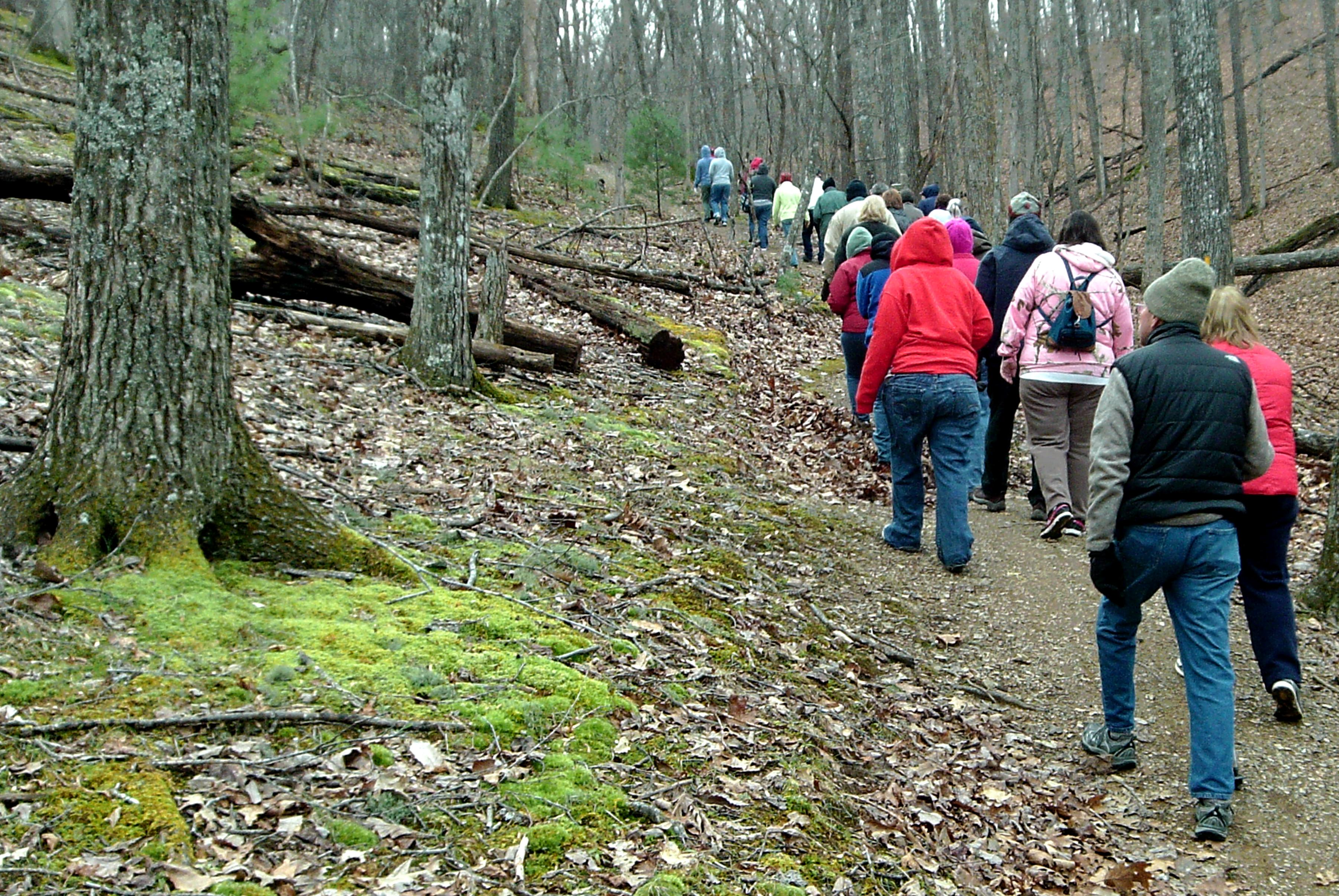
Participants in a First Day Hike in the park in 2014

- List of Virginia state parks
- Great Depression
- Franklin D. Roosevelt
- Green Pastures Recreation Area
- Falling Spring Falls State Park
