= Shenandoah River Raymond R. "Andy" Guest Jr. State Park =

State park in Virginia, United States

Shenandoah River State Park
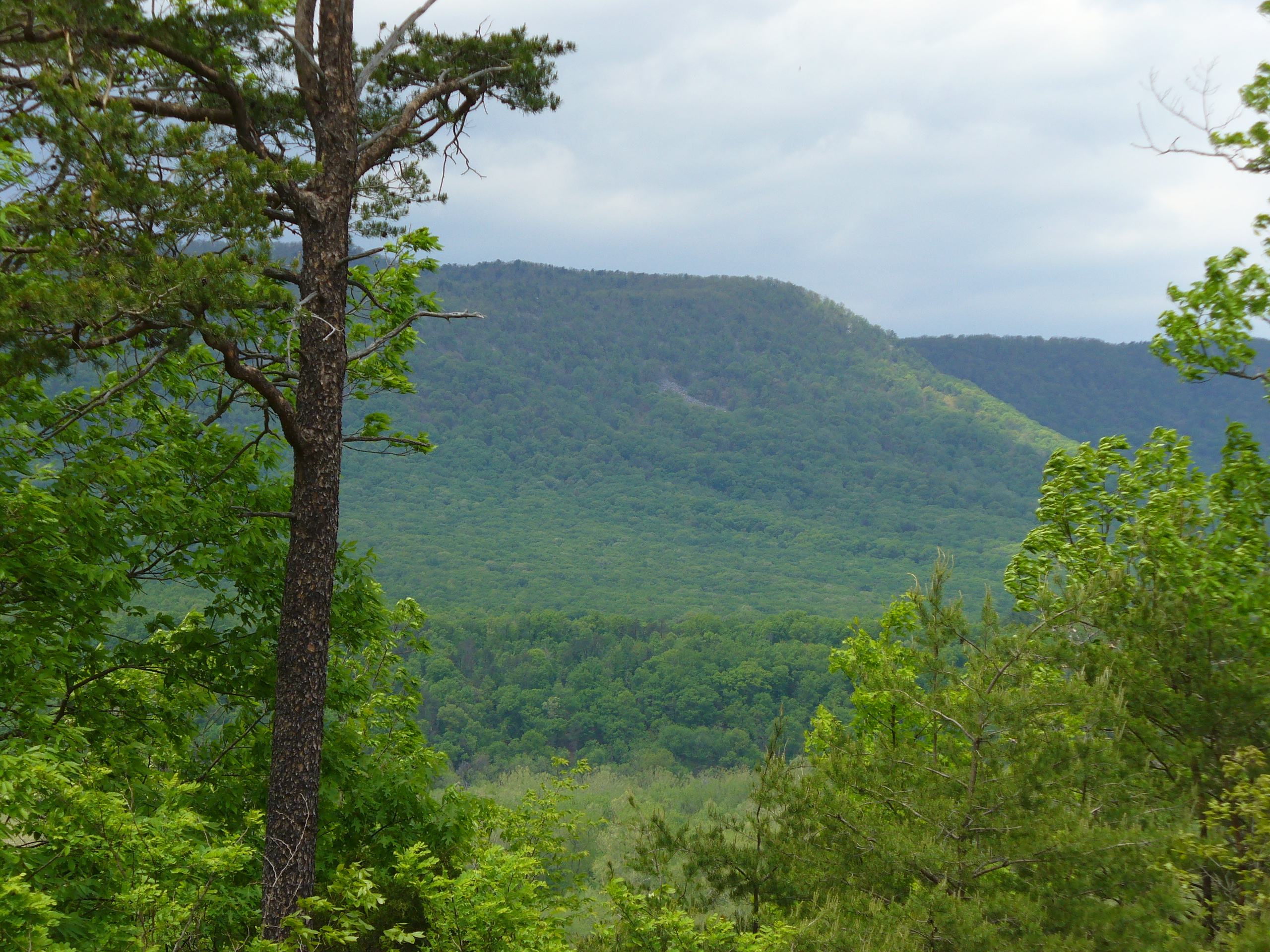
- The view from Cullers Overlook in Shenandoah River State Park

- Location within Virginia Location within the United States
- Location: 350 Daughter of Stars Dr., Bentonville, VA 22610
- Coordinates: 38°51′20″N 78°18′12″W
- Area: 1,619 acres (6.55 km^{2})
- Established: 1994
- Governing body: Virginia Department of Conservation and Recreation

Shenandoah River Raymond R. "Andy" Guest Jr. State Park, known generally as Shenandoah River State Park, is a state park near the town of Bentonville, Virginia, United States. The park was established in 1994, and covers 1,619 acres (6.55 km^{2}) along the South Fork Shenandoah River. It was named for Virginia Delegate Andy Guest, long a resident of the area.

== See also ==
- List of Virginia state parks
