= Scottsburg, Virginia =

- Town
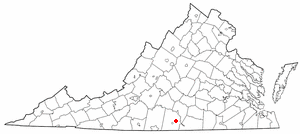
- Location of Scottsburg, Virginia
- Coordinates: 36°45′36″N 78°47′26″W
- Country: United States
- State: Virginia
- County: Halifax

Area
  - Total: 0.75 sq mi (1.93 km^{2})
  - Land: 0.74 sq mi (1.92 km^{2})
  - Water: 0.0039 sq mi (0.01 km^{2})
- Elevation: 374 ft (114 m)

Population (2020)
  - Total: 127
  - Estimate (2019): 128
  - Density: 172.9/sq mi (66.77/km^{2})
- Time zone: UTC-5 (Eastern (EST))
  - Summer (DST): UTC-4 (EDT)
- ZIP code: 24589
- Area code: 434
- FIPS code: 51-70752
- GNIS feature ID: 1474116

Scottsburg is a town in Halifax County, Virginia, United States. As of the 2020 census, Scottsburg had a population of 127.

== Geography ==
Scottsburg is located in eastern Halifax County at 36°45′36″N 78°47′26″W (36.759890, -78.790515). Virginia State Route 344 passes through the center of town, leading northwest 2 miles (3 km) to U.S. Route 360 and southeast 8 miles (13 km) to its terminus at Staunton River State Park.

According to the United States Census Bureau, Scottsburg has a total area of 0.69 square miles (1.8 km^{2}), of which 2.3 acres (9,371 m^{2}), or 0.52%, are water. Gibson Creek, a tributary of the Banister River, flows north to south through the center of town.

== Demographics ==
Historical population
Census	Pop.	Note	%±
1880	87		—
1890	297		241.4%
1930	225		—
1940	239		6.2%
1950	222		−7.1%
1960	188		−15.3%
1970	157		−16.5%
1980	335		113.4%
1990	152		−54.6%
2000	145		−4.6%
2010	119		−17.9%
2020	127		6.7%
U.S. Decennial Census

At the 2000 census there were 145 people, 56 households, and 39 families living in the town. The population density was 196.0 people per square mile (75.7/km^{2}). There were 64 housing units at an average density of 86.5 per square mile (33.4/km^{2}). The racial makeup of the town was 80.69% White, 16.55% African American, 2.76% from other races. Hispanic or Latino of any race were 6.21%.

Of the 56 households 35.7% had children under the age of 18 living with them, 51.8% were married couples living together, 17.9% had a female householder with no husband present, and 28.6% were non-families. 26.8% of households were one person and 10.7% were one person aged 65 or older. The average household size was 2.59 and the average family size was 3.13.

The age distribution was 30.3% under the age of 18, 6.2% from 18 to 24, 29.7% from 25 to 44, 21.4% from 45 to 64, and 12.4% 65 or older. The median age was 34 years. For every 100 females there were 88.3 males. For every 100 females aged 18 and over, there were 87.0 males.

The median household income was $28,750 and the median family income was $25,938. Males had a median income of $28,750 versus $24,583 for females. The per capita income for the town was $15,289. There were 13.3% of families and 10.7% of the population living below the poverty line, including 8.9% of under eighteens and 19.0% of those over 64.
