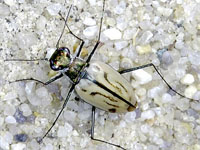
- Habroscelimorpha dorsalis dorsalis

Conservation status
- Vulnerable (NatureServe)

Scientific classification
- Domain: Eukaryota
- Kingdom: Animalia
- Phylum: Arthropoda
- Class: Insecta
- Order: Coleoptera
- Suborder: Adephaga
- Family: Cicindelidae
- Genus: Habroscelimorpha
- Species: H. dorsalis

Binomial name
- Habroscelimorpha dorsalis (Say, 1817)

Synonyms
- Cicindela dorsalis Say, 1817

= Habroscelimorpha dorsalis =

Species of beetle

Habroscelimorpha dorsalis, commonly known as the eastern beach tiger beetle, is a species of flashy tiger beetle (Cicindelini tribe) in the family Cicindelidae. It is found in Central America and North America.

== Description ==
The body length is 13 to 15 millimetres (0.51 to 0.59 in). The head and thorax are bronze-green, the legs are long and slender, and the elytra are white to light tan with narrow bronze markings. The head has long antennae, large compound eyes, and powerful jaws. There are white hairs on the pronotum and the sides of the abdomen. The pale coloration provides camouflage for the beetle on the light sand. The larvae are grub-like, with long, segmented bodies and large jaws similar to those of adults.

Habroscelimorpha dorsalis dorsalis, commonly known as the Northeastern beach tiger beetle, is the largest subspecies of Habroscelimorpha dorsalis. In 2012, the subgenus Habroscelimorpa was reclassified to the genus level Fitting to its name, the Northeastern beach tiger beetle is found along the north-eastern coast of the US and dwells in small sand burrows. The beetle is highly susceptible to abundant human activity and beach erosion, and in 1990, the Northeastern beach tiger beetle was listed as “threatened” under the Endangered Species Act (ESA). It is the only subspecies to be listed under the ESA.

The larva of the subspecies C. d. media is notable for its ability to leap into the air, loop its body into a rotating wheel and roll along the sand at a high speed using wind to propel itself. If the wind is strong enough, the larva can cover up to 60 metres (200 ft) in this manner. This remarkable ability may have evolved to help the larva escape predators such as the thynnid wasp Methocha. Wheel locomotion in nature is extremely rare and has only been observed in a few animals around the world.

== Subspecies ==
These four subspecies belong to the species Habroscelimorpha dorsalis:

- Habroscelimorpha dorsalis dorsalis (Say, 1817)
- Habroscelimorpha dorsalis media (LeConte, 1856)
- Habroscelimorpha dorsalis saulcyi (Guérin-Méneville, 1840)
- Habroscelimorpha dorsalis venusta (LaFerte-Senectere, 1841)

== Range and habitat ==
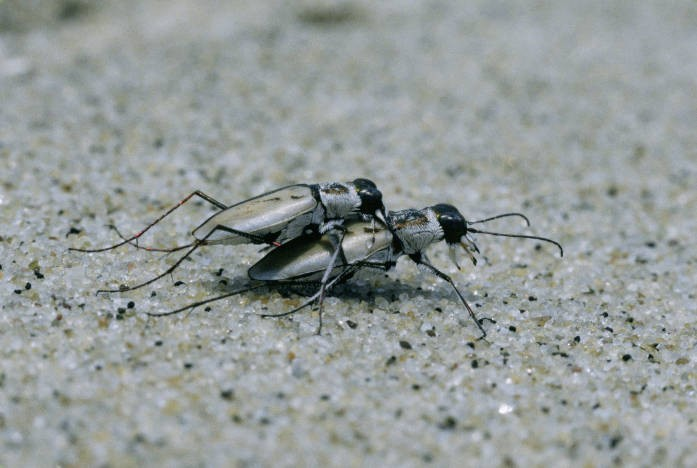
Habroscelimorpha dorsalis dorsalis

H. d. media is found along the southeast coast of the United States, including South Carolina. H. d. dorsalis is found along the northeast coast. C. d. saulcyi and C. d. venusta occur along the coasts of Florida, the Gulf of Mexico, and Mexico. In general, C. dorsalis is most abundant on broad, fine-sand beaches that are highly exposed to tidal action and relatively undisturbed by humans. In order for the beetles to breed, beaches need to be at least 100 metres (330 ft) long and 2 metres (6 ft 7 in) wide, 5-8 being the optimal width. The eastern beach tiger beetle prefers a climate with average temperatures exceeding 15 °C and moderate to arid rainfall totals.

== Biology ==
The entire life cycle lasts 2 years. Adults emerge between mid-June and mid-August, usually reaching peak abundance by mid-July and declining by September. They spend the day foraging in the intertidal zone when the weather is warm and sunny. They feed on small invertebrates including flies, ants, and amphipods, but will also scavenge dead fish and crabs.

Mating takes place between mid-July and early August when the weather is warm and humid. Females lay their eggs in the intertidal zone. They use sensitive hairs on their abdomen to determine whether the soil moisture content is suitable for larval survival and development. Oviposition takes place at night. The female uses her ovipositor to create a small hole in the sand where she deposits the eggs individually.

Eggs hatch in mid-August, and the larvae dig vertical burrows where they secure themselves using hooks along their abdomen. They are predatory and prey on passing insects and other small invertebrates. Tiger beetle larvae go through three instars before pupating. They usually reach the second instar by September. As winter approaches, the larvae dig new burrows higher up the beach to protect themselves against storms and wave activity. After overwintering, they emerge in late May and June. Then they reach the third instar and overwinter again. The following spring they pupate in their burrows and emerge as adults.

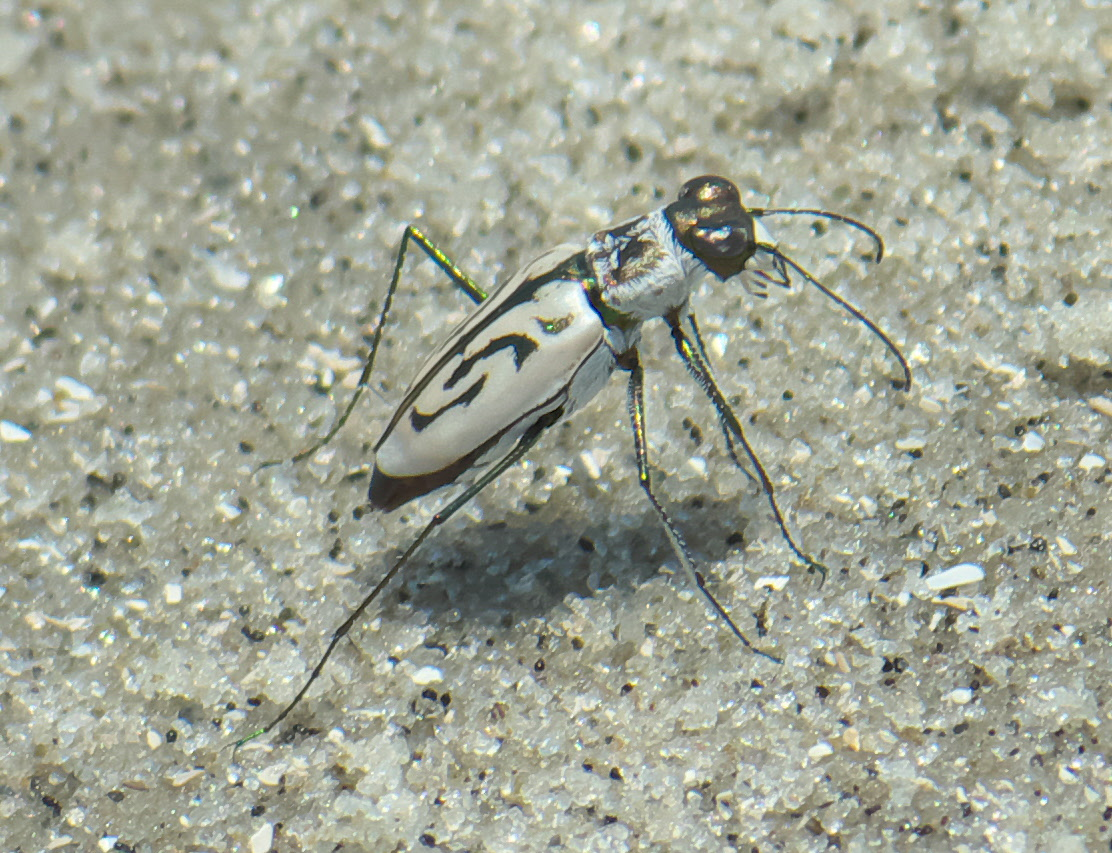
Habroscelimorpha dorsalis media

== Status ==
The subspecies C. d. dorsalis (northeastern beach tiger beetle) suffered a major decline over the last 20 years. It used to be found all along the Atlantic coast of the US from Massachusetts to Virginia. Today it only occurs in the Chesapeake Bay of Maryland, Martha's Vineyard island off the coast of Massachusetts, and Virginia. This decline was caused by the destruction and disturbance of the beetle's natural beach habitat by human activity, one of the greatest threats being shoreline hardening by the placement of rip-rap. Other threats include pollution and pesticides, as well as the use of off-road vehicles that crush adults and larvae, also damaging larval burrows. In 2009 the United States Fish and Wildlife Service recommended C. d. dorsalis be uplisted to endangered status.
