= Caladenia robinsonii =

Frankston spider orchid

Conservation status
- Endangered (EPBC Act)

Scientific classification
- Kingdom: Plantae
- Clade: Tracheophytes
- Clade: Angiosperms
- Clade: Monocots
- Order: Asparagales
- Family: Orchidaceae
- Subfamily: Orchidoideae
- Tribe: Diurideae
- Genus: Caladenia
- Species: C. robinsonii

Binomial name
- Caladenia robinsonii G.W.Carr

Synonyms
- Arachnorchis robinsonii (G.W.Carr) D.L.Jones & M.A.Clem.

Species of orchid

Caladenia robinsonii, commonly known as the Frankston spider orchid, is a plant in the orchid family Orchidaceae and is endemic to Victoria. It is a ground orchid with a single hairy leaf and one or two red and creamy-yellow flowers with dark red glandular tips on the sepals. In 2010 only about forty specimens of this plant, growing in a single population were known.

== Description ==
Caladenia robinsonii is a terrestrial, perennial, deciduous, herb with an underground tuber. A shoot arises from the tuber each year in the early autumn producing a single hairy leaf in May. The leaf is 80–100 mm (3–4 in) long and 8–10 mm (0.3–0.4 in) wide. In September or October, one or two red and creamy-yellow flowers 30–40 mm (1–2 in) across are produced on a hairy stem 200–300 mm (8–10 in) high. The sepals, but not the petals, have thick, red glandular tips 5–10 mm (0.2–0.4 in) long. The dorsal sepal is erect near its base then gently curves forward and is 25–35 mm (0.98–1.4 in) long and 3–4 mm (0.1–0.2 in) wide. The lateral sepals are a similar size to the dorsal sepal but spread widely. The petals are 20–30 mm (0.8–1 in) long, about 3 mm (0.1 in) wide and arranged like the lateral sepals. The labellum is 12–14 mm (0.5–0.6 in) long and 7–11 mm (0.3–0.4 in) wide, and creamy yellow with a dark red tip. The sides of the labellum have many short red teeth and the tip of the labellum curves downwards. There are four or six rows of crowded, shiny red calli along the labellum mid-line. Flowering occurs in September and October.

== Taxonomy ==
Caladenia robinsonii was first formally described in 1991 by Geoffrey Carr from material collected in Frankston North and the description was published in Indigenous Flora and Fauna Association Miscellaneous Paper.

== Distribution and habitat ==
The Frankston spider orchid occurs in heathy coast manna gum woodland, on the Mornington Peninsula.

== Ecology ==
The flowers of C. robinsonii exude a scent that mimics pheromones of the female thynnid wasp, which attracts male wasps that pollinate the flowers. The orchid has a symbiotic relationship with a mycorrhizal fungus that enables it to absorb nutrients.

== Conservation ==
The population from which Carr obtained the type specimen was lost when the locality was developed in the 1990s for housing, however a second population was discovered at Rosebud in 1990. Potential threats to the latter population, estimated to be around 40 plants, include weed invasion, tramping, fire and grazing by rabbits. In 2010, 150 of the orchids were planted in rehabilitated areas by volunteers, utilising seed that had been propagated by the Royal Botanic Gardens, Melbourne.
