= Blue ant (disambiguation) =

The blue ant is a species of wasp native to Australia.

Blue ant or Blue Ant may also refer to:

- Polyrhachis cyaniventris, a blue ant species found in coconut groves in the Philippines.
- BlueAnt Wireless, an Australian vendor of Bluetooth-enabled products and wireless accessories (founded in 2003)
- Blue Ant Media, a Canadian media company (founded in 2011)
- Chinese workers and farmers in the 1950s and 1960s (so called because, due to China's then-limited textile industry, most of them wore blue)
- Blue Ant, a fictional marketing company appearing in several of William Gibson's novels (since 2003)
