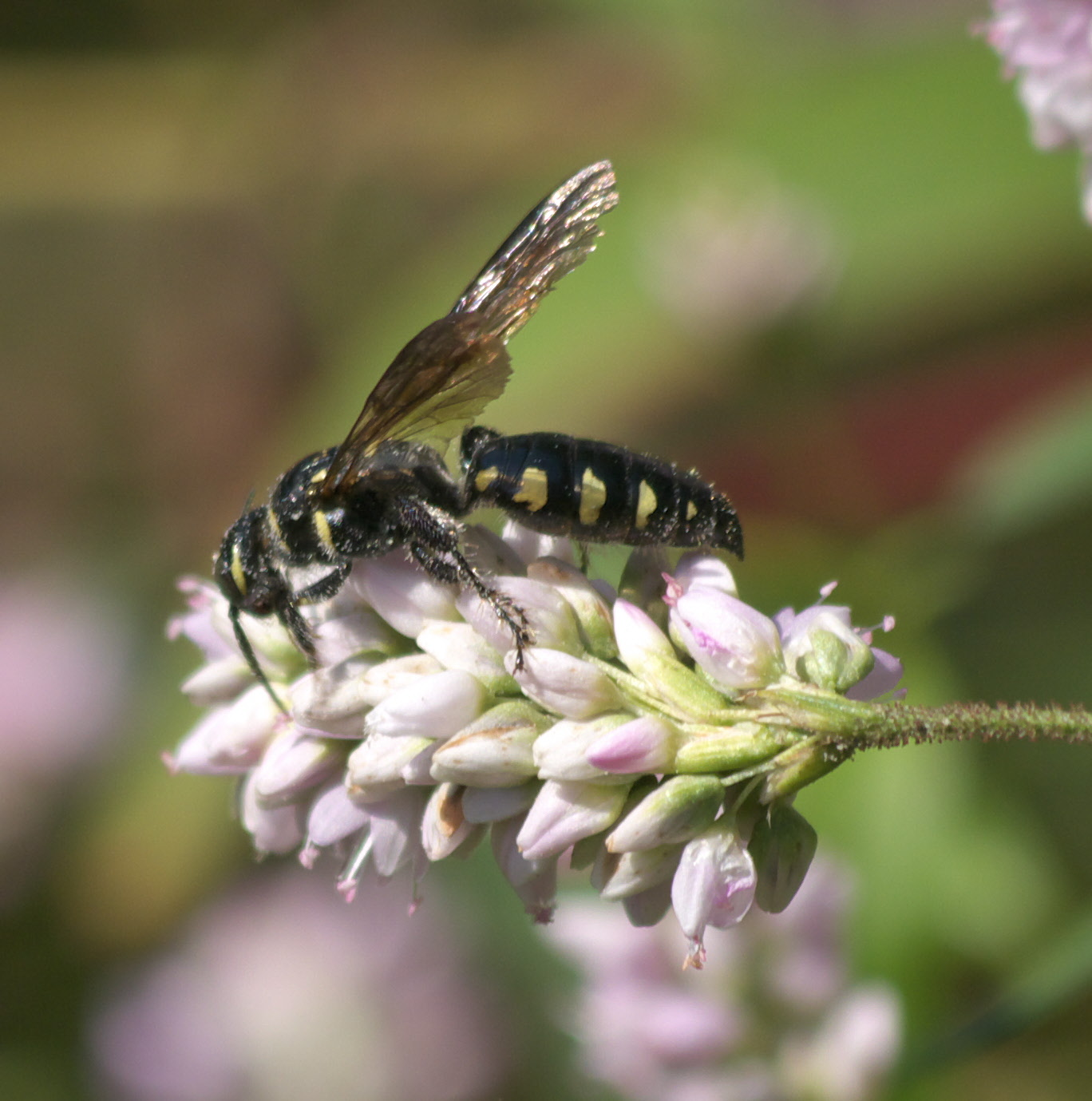

Scientific classification
- Kingdom: Animalia
- Phylum: Arthropoda
- Class: Insecta
- Order: Hymenoptera
- Family: Thynnidae
- Genus: Myzinum
- Species: M. obscurum

Binomial name
- Myzinum obscurum (Fabricius, 1805)

Synonyms
- Tiphia obscura (Fabricius 1805) Myzinum beryli (Brimley 1927)

= Myzinum obscurum =

Species of wasp

Myzinum obscurum is a species of wasp in the family Thynnidae. It is found in the Eastern United States.
