= Thynnus zonatus =

Scientific classification
- Kingdom: Animalia
- Phylum: Arthropoda
- Class: Insecta
- Order: Hymenoptera
- Family: Thynnidae
- Genus: Thynnus
- Species: T. zonatus

Binomial name
- Thynnus zonatus Guérin-Méneville, 1838

Species of wasp

Thynnus zonatus is a species of wasp found in Australia.
