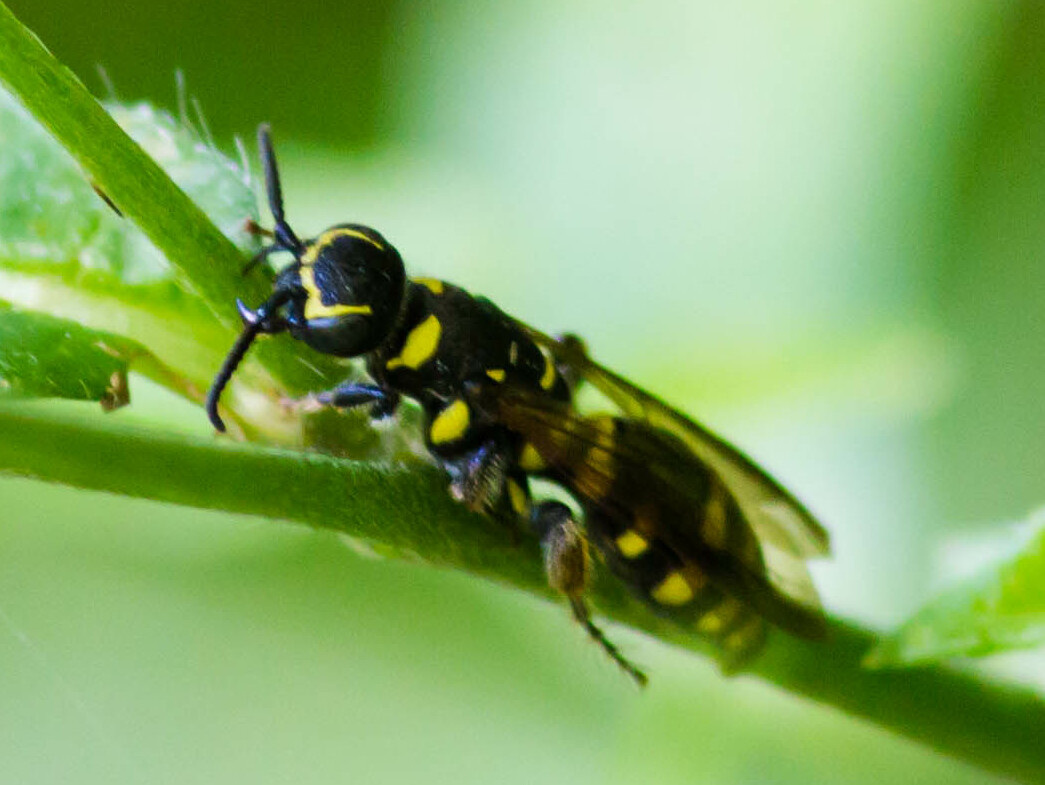

Scientific classification
- Domain: Eukaryota
- Kingdom: Animalia
- Phylum: Arthropoda
- Class: Insecta
- Order: Hymenoptera
- Family: Thynnidae
- Genus: Myzinum
- Species: M. maculatum

Binomial name
- Myzinum maculatum (Fabricius, 1793)

= Myzinum maculatum =

Species of wasp

Myzinum maculatum is a species of wasp in the family Thynnidae. It is used as a biological control of turf grass pests.
