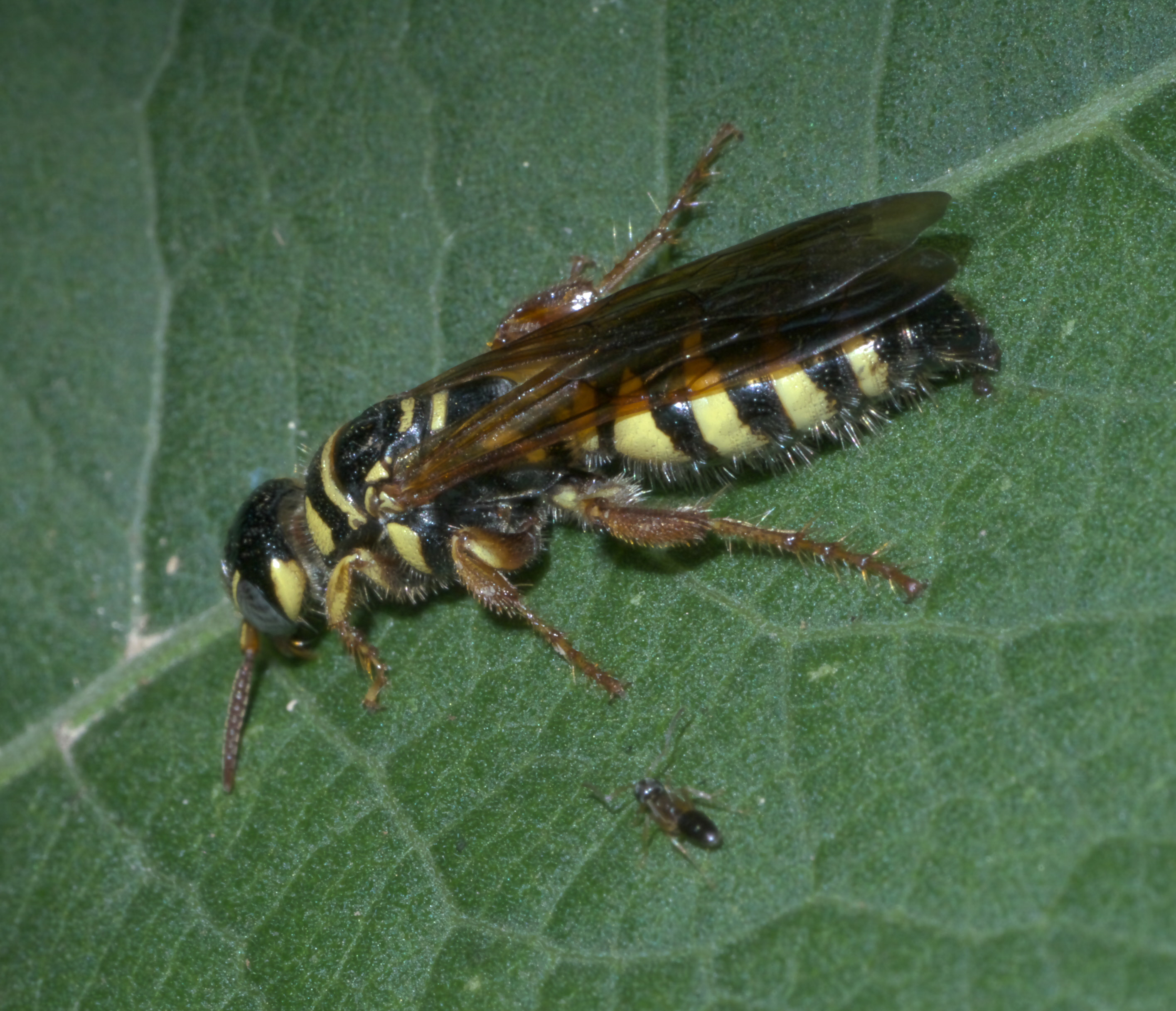

Scientific classification
- Domain: Eukaryota
- Kingdom: Animalia
- Phylum: Arthropoda
- Class: Insecta
- Order: Hymenoptera
- Family: Thynnidae
- Subfamily: Myzininae
- Genus: Myzinum
- Species: M. quinquecinctum

Binomial name
- Myzinum quinquecinctum (Fabricius, 1775)

= Myzinum quinquecinctum =

Species of wasp

Myzinum quinquecinctum, the five-banded thynnid wasp, is a species of thynnid wasp in the family Thynnidae, found mainly in North America east of the Rocky Mountains.

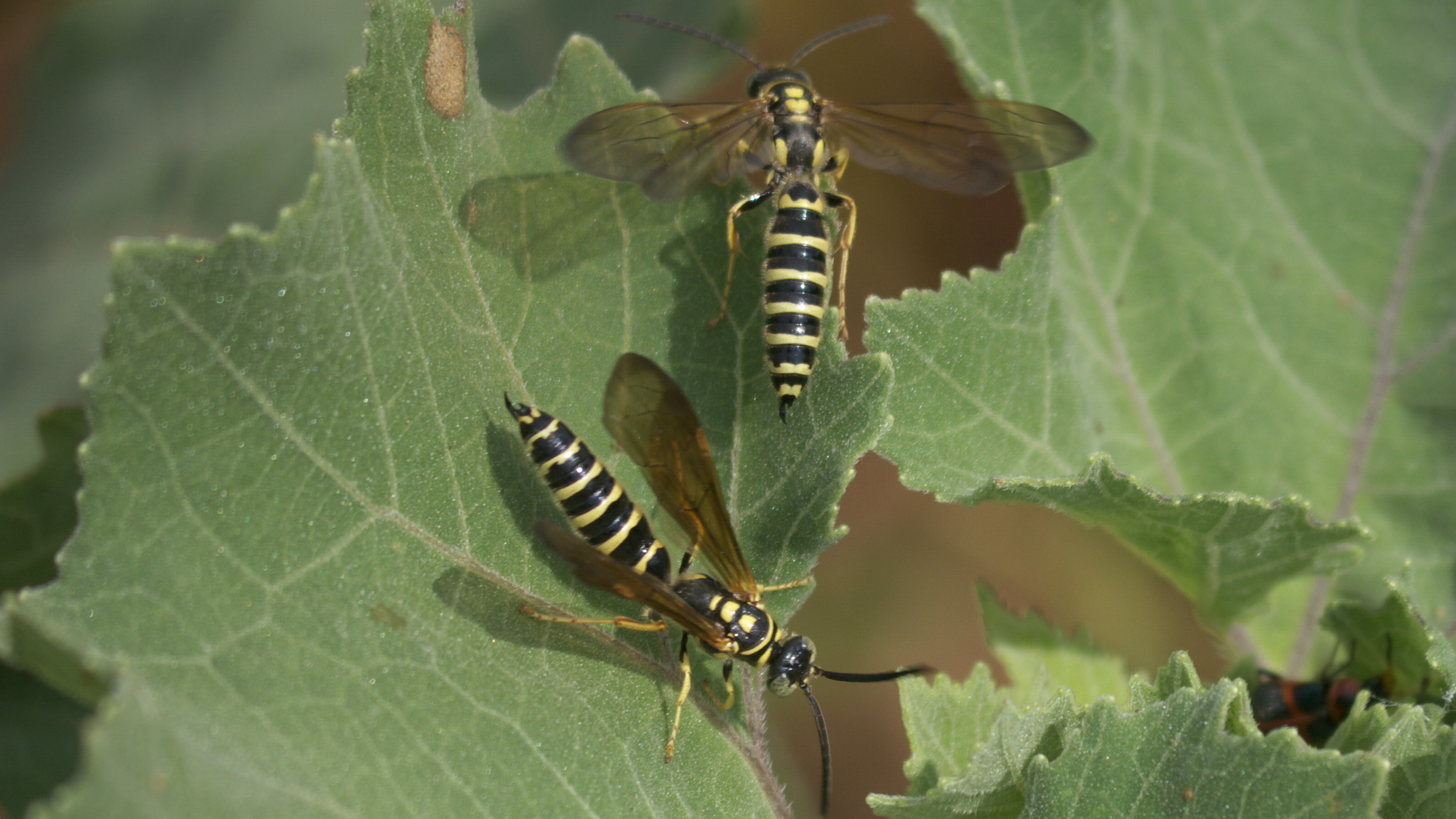
Myzinum quinquecinctum
