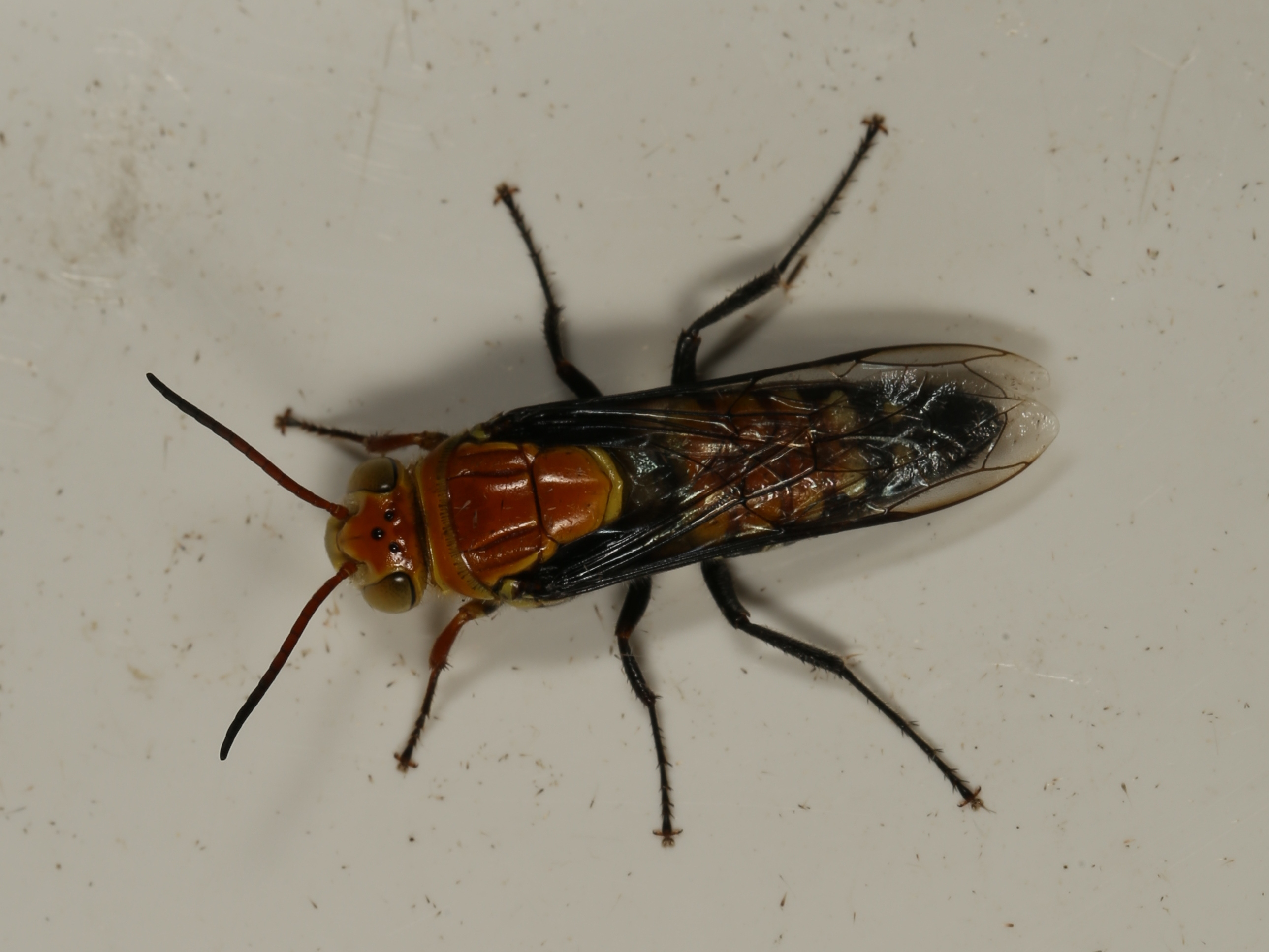
- Male Thynnus pulchralis

Scientific classification
- Kingdom: Animalia
- Phylum: Arthropoda
- Class: Insecta
- Order: Hymenoptera
- Family: Thynnidae
- Subfamily: Thynninae
- Genus: Thynnus; Fabricius, 1775

= Thynnus =

Genus of wasps

Thynnus is a genus of wasps in the family Thynnidae.

== Selected species ==
- Thynnus brenchleyi Smith, 1873
- Thynnus brisbanensis Turner, 1909
- Thynnus conator Turner, 1910
- Thynnus cookii Turner, 1910
- Thynnus darwiniensis Turner, 1908
- Thynnus dentatus Fabricius, 1775
- Thynnus elgneri Turner, 1908
- Thynnus emarginatus Fabricius, 1775
- Thynnus pedestris (Fabricius, 1775)
- Thynnus pulchralis Smith, 1859
- Thynnus sabulosus Turner, 1908
- Thynnus ventralis Smith, 1865
- Thynnus zonatus Guérin-Méneville, 1838
