= Agriomyia =

Scientific classification
- Kingdom: Animalia
- Phylum: Arthropoda
- Class: Insecta
- Order: Hymenoptera
- Family: Thynnidae
- Subfamily: Thynninae
- Genus: Agriomyia

Genus of wasps

Agriomyia is a genus of wasps in the family Thynnidae.
