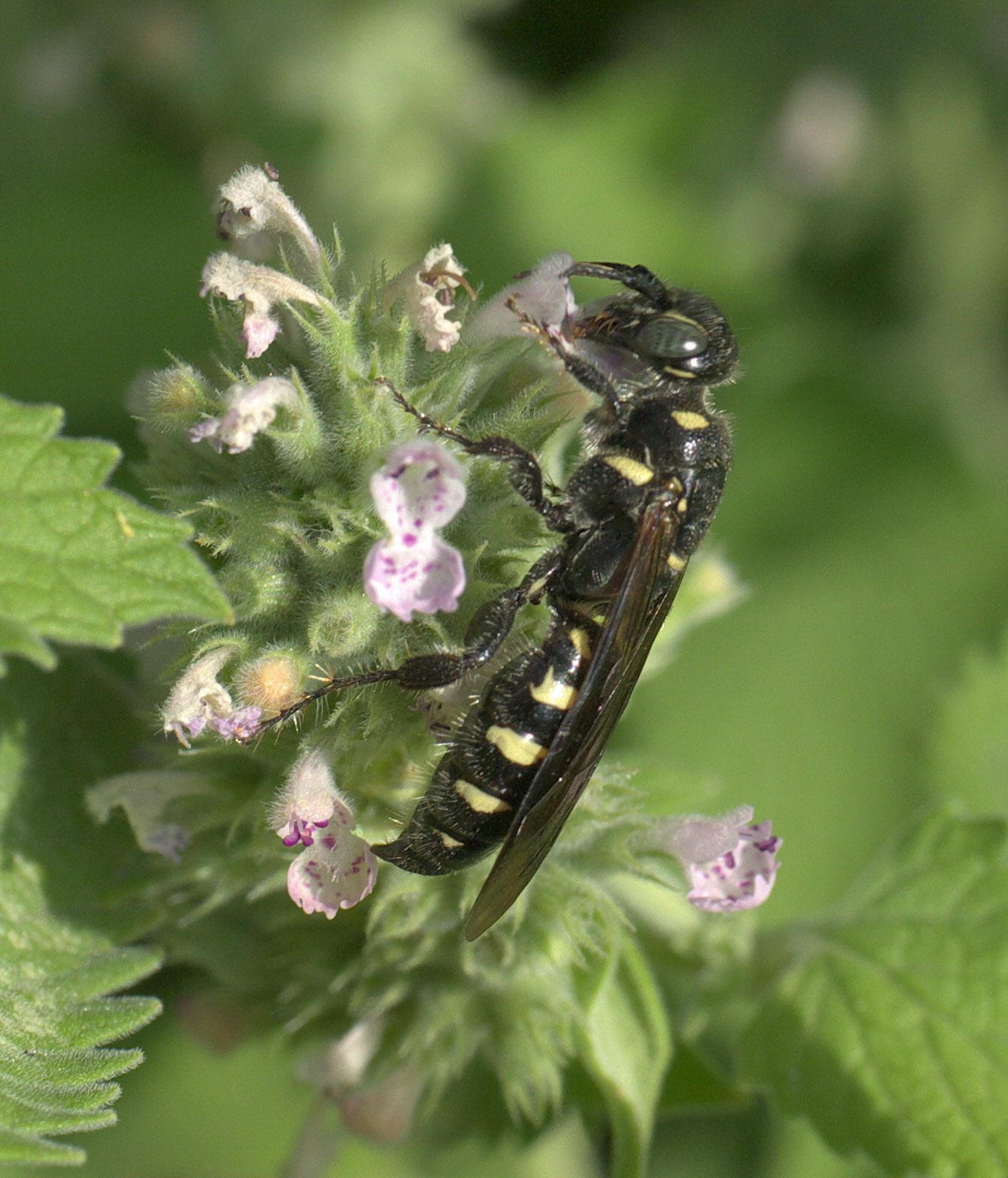
- Myzinum obscurum

Scientific classification
- Kingdom: Animalia
- Phylum: Arthropoda
- Class: Insecta
- Order: Hymenoptera
- Family: Thynnidae
- Subfamily: Myzininae
- Genus: Myzinum; Latreille, 1803

= Myzinum =

Genus of wasps

Myzinum is a genus of wasps in the family Thynnidae. There are 63 species presently recognized in Myzinum. They measure 7–24 mm. They parasitize white grubs (scarab larvae), including Phyllophaga. They are used as biological controls.

== Distribution ==
Myzinum are found in New World and are most diverse in the Neotropics.

== North American species list ==
The following 10 species occur in North America:

- Myzinum carolinianum (Panzer, 1806)
- Myzinum cocoritense Kimsey, 2009
- Myzinum confluens (Cresson, 1865)
- Myzinum dubiosum (Cresson, 1872)
- Myzinum frontale (Cresson, 1875)
- Myzinum fulviceps (Cameron, 1900)
- Myzinum maculatum (Fabricius, 1793)
- Myzinum navajo (Krombein 1938)
- Myzinum obscurum (Fabricius, 1805)
- Myzinum quinquecinctum (Fabricius, 1775) (five-banded thynnid wasp)

== Gallery ==
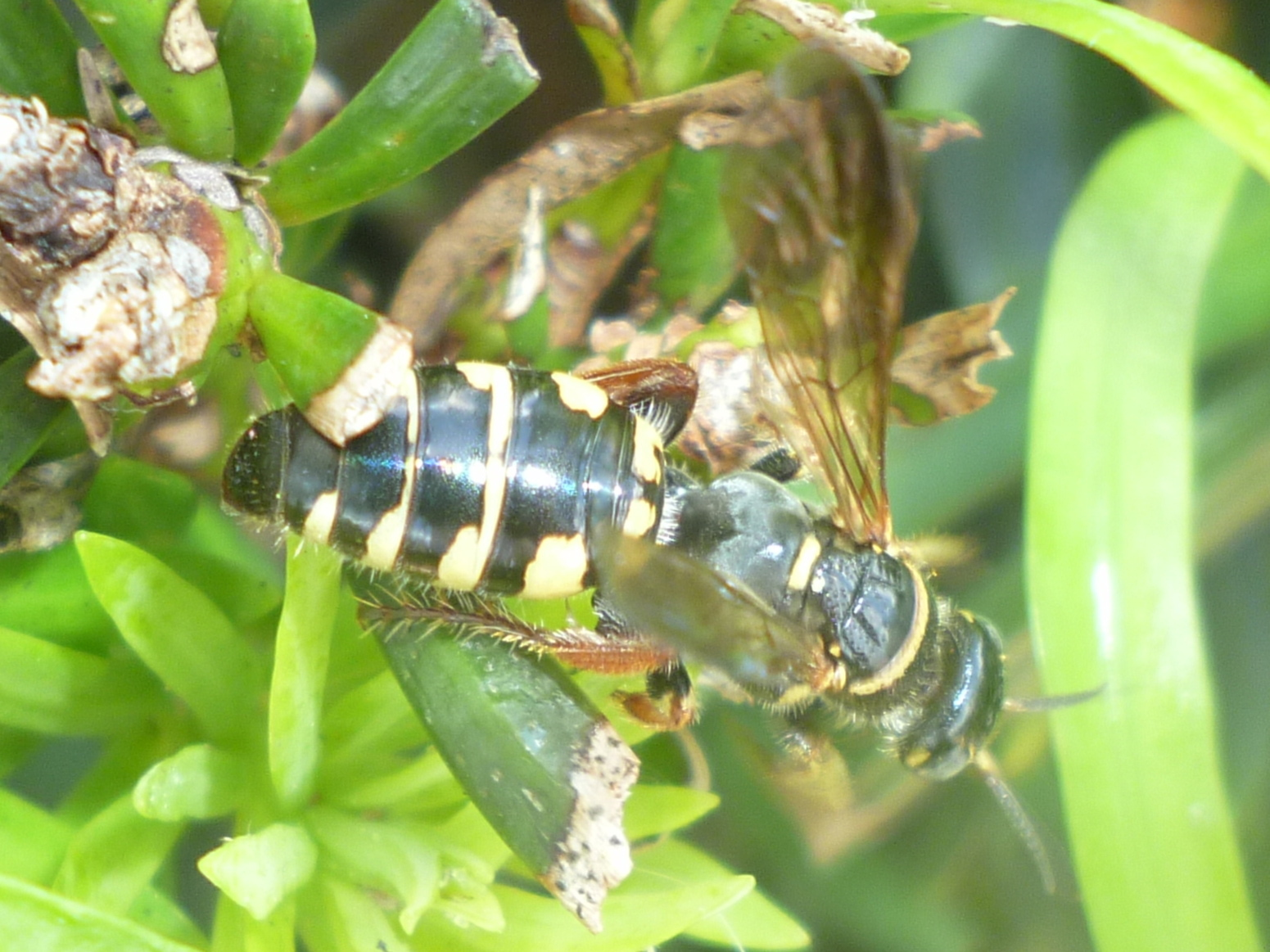
Female M. carolinianum

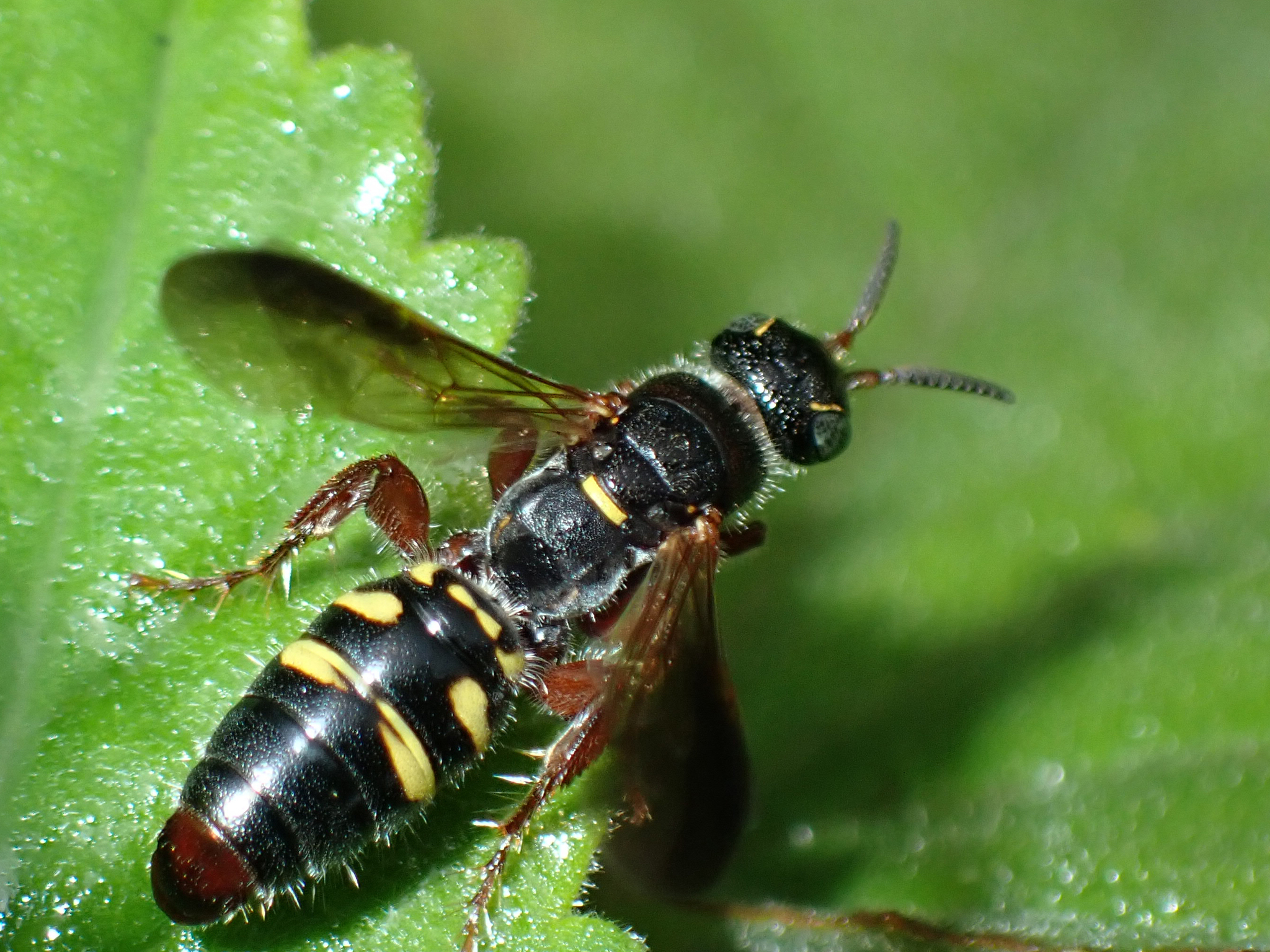
Female M. dubiosum

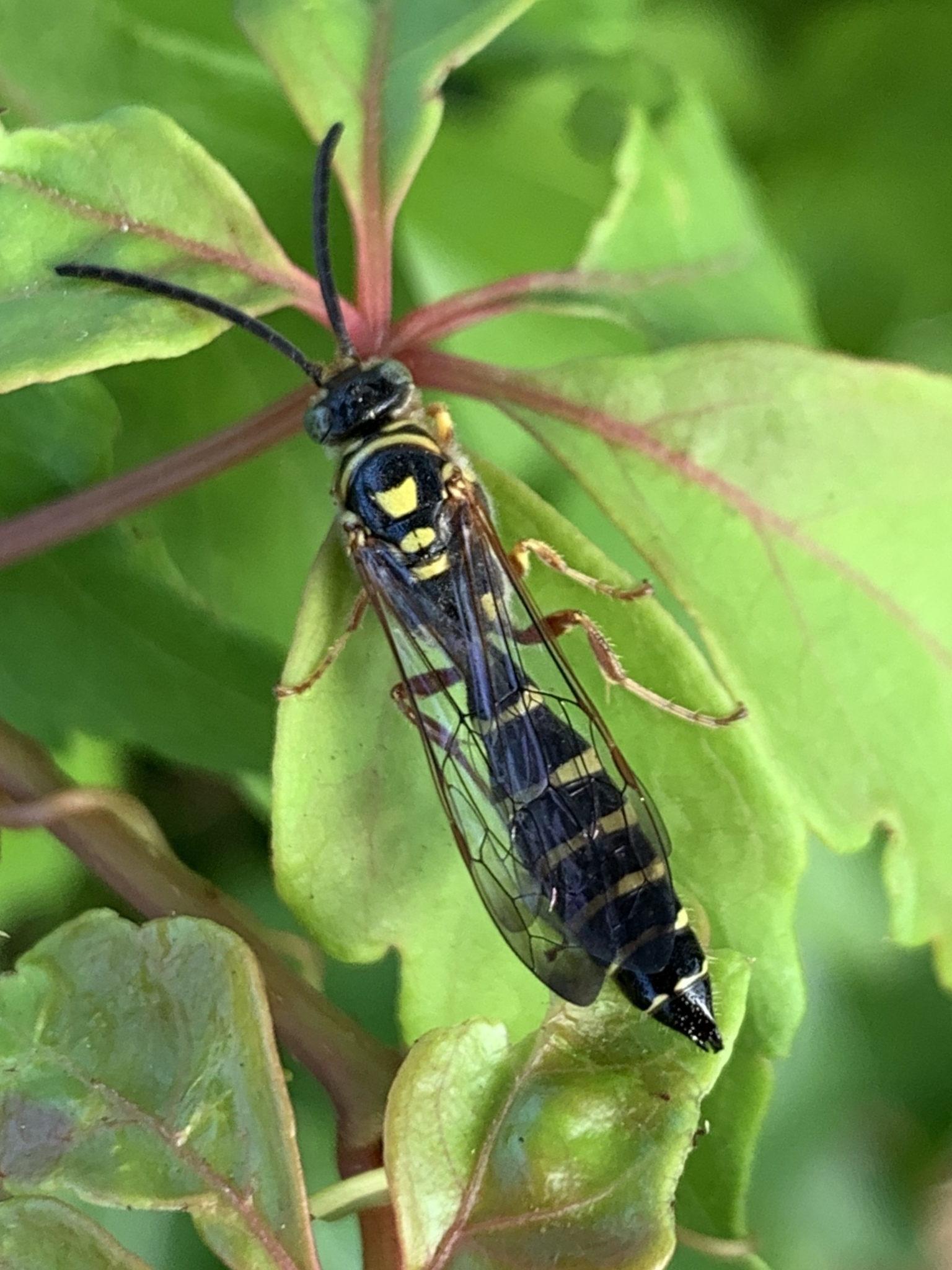
Male M. dubiosum

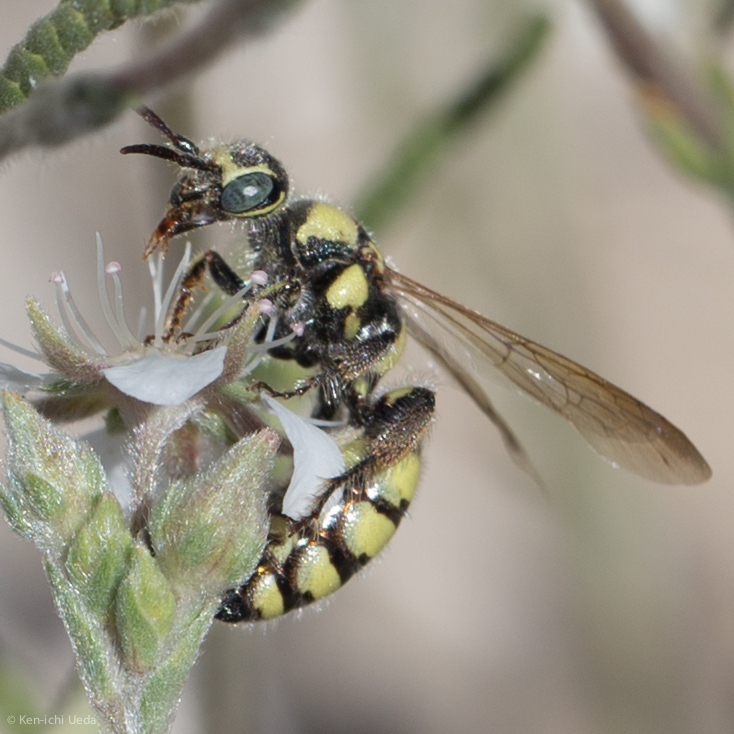
Female M. frontale

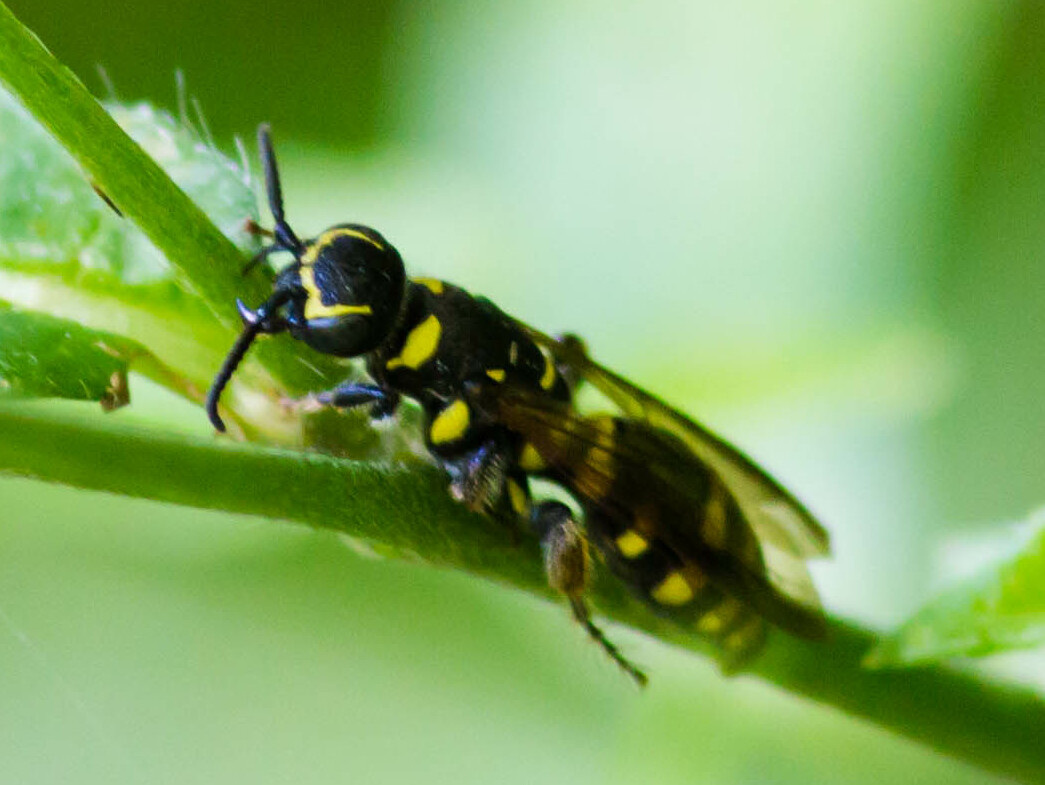
Female M. maculatum

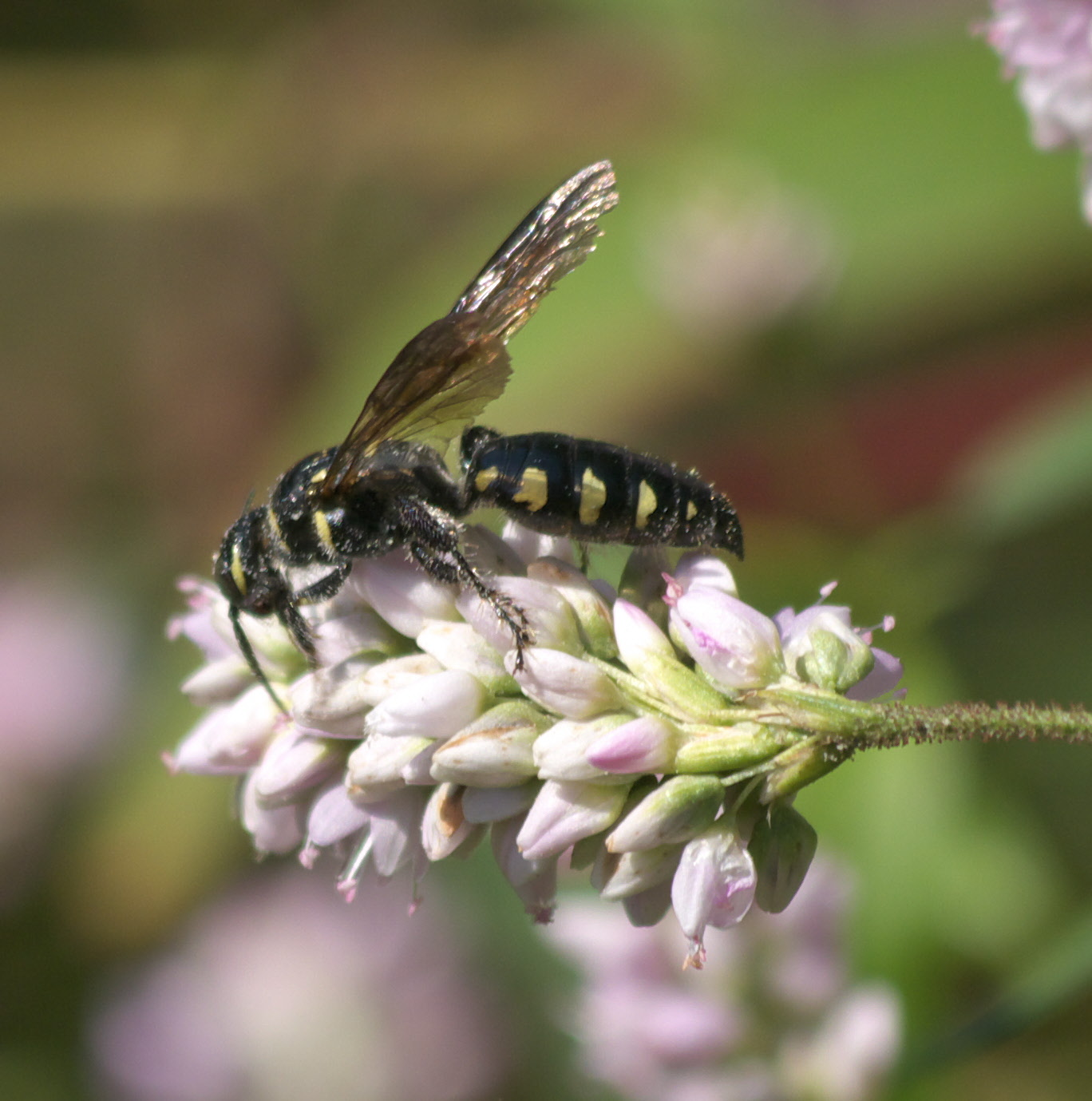
Female M. obscurum

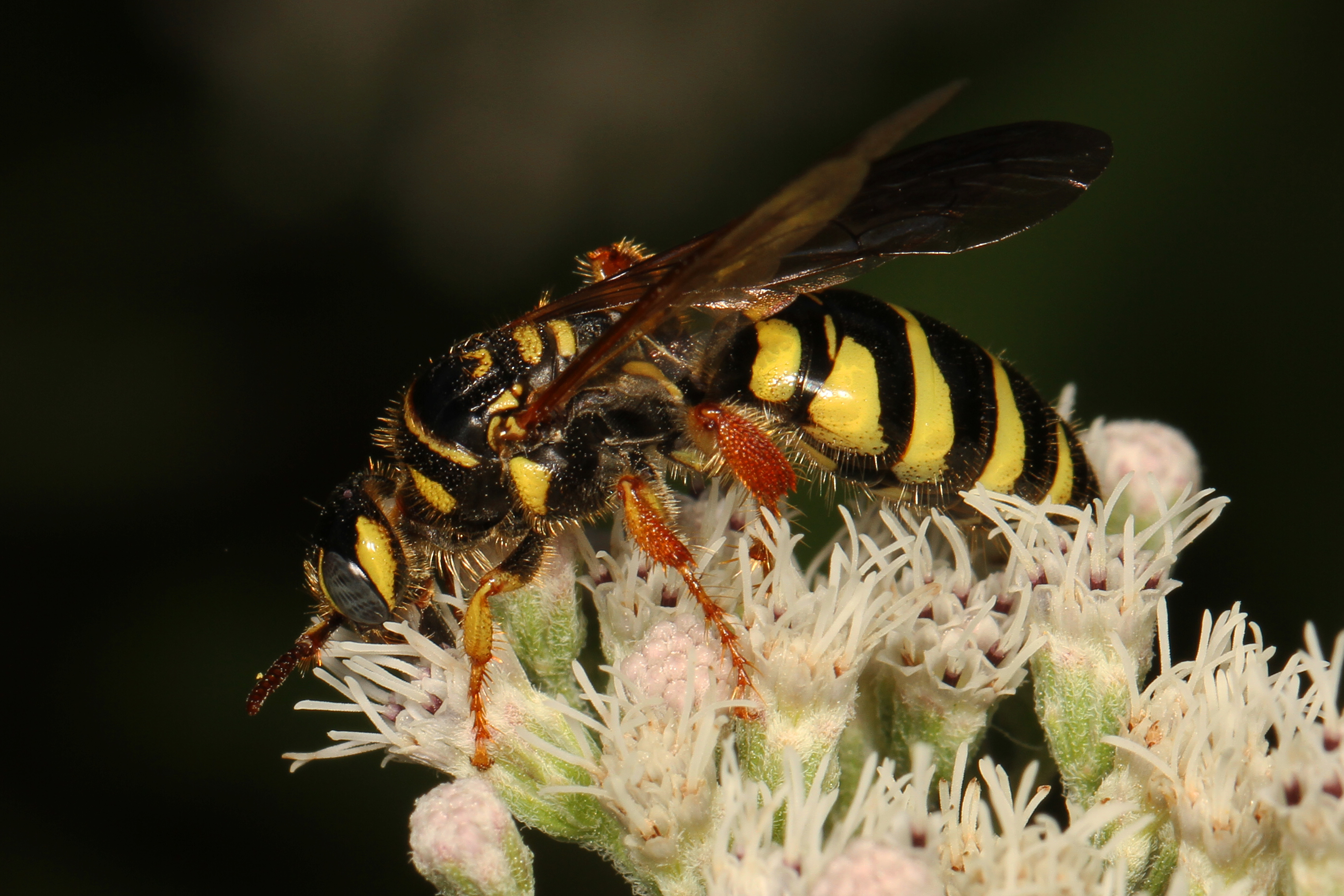
Female Myzinum quinquecinctum

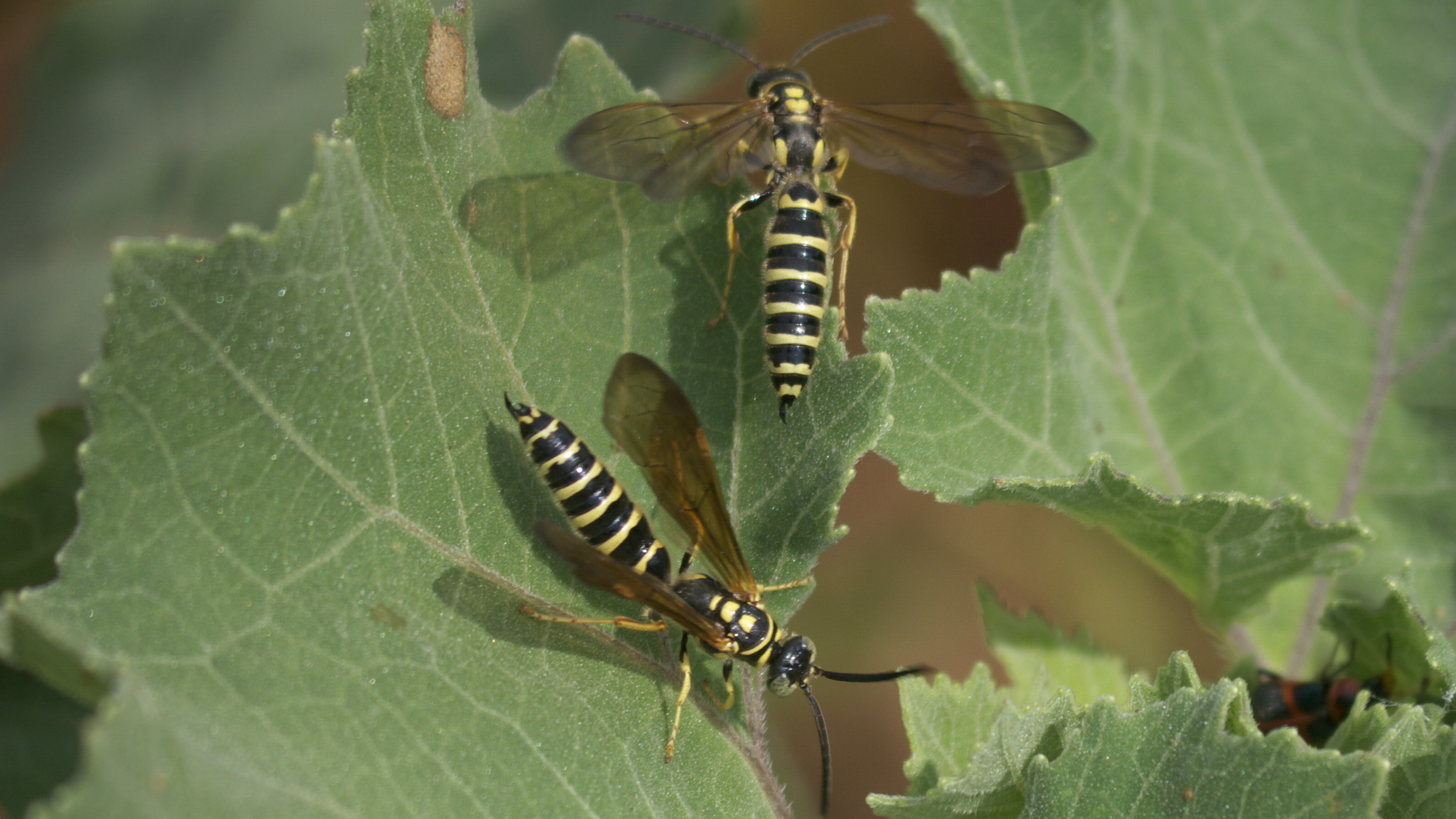
Male Myzinum quinquecinctum
