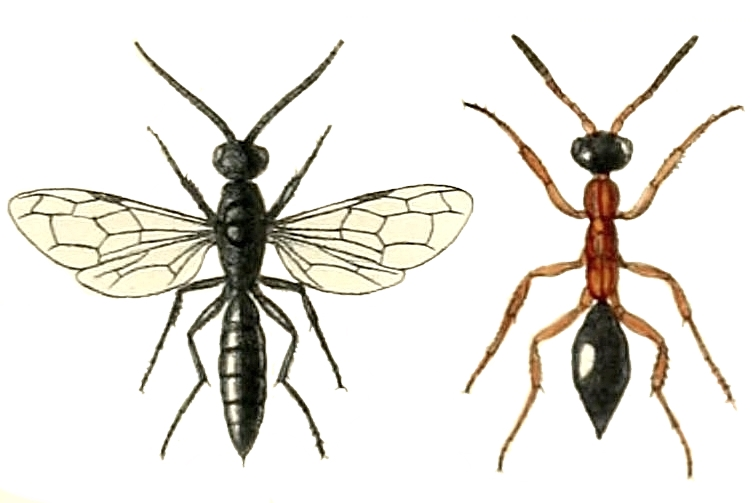
- Methocha ichneumonides

Scientific classification
- Domain: Eukaryota
- Kingdom: Animalia
- Phylum: Arthropoda
- Class: Insecta
- Order: Hymenoptera
- Family: Thynnidae
- Subfamily: Methochinae; Rohwer, 1916

= Methochinae =

Subfamily of wasps

Methochinae is a small subfamily of solitary wasps in the family Thynnidae, whose larvae are parasitoids of various tiger beetle larvae.

== Genera ==
- Methocha Latreille, 1804
- Pterombrus Smith, 1869

== Gallery ==
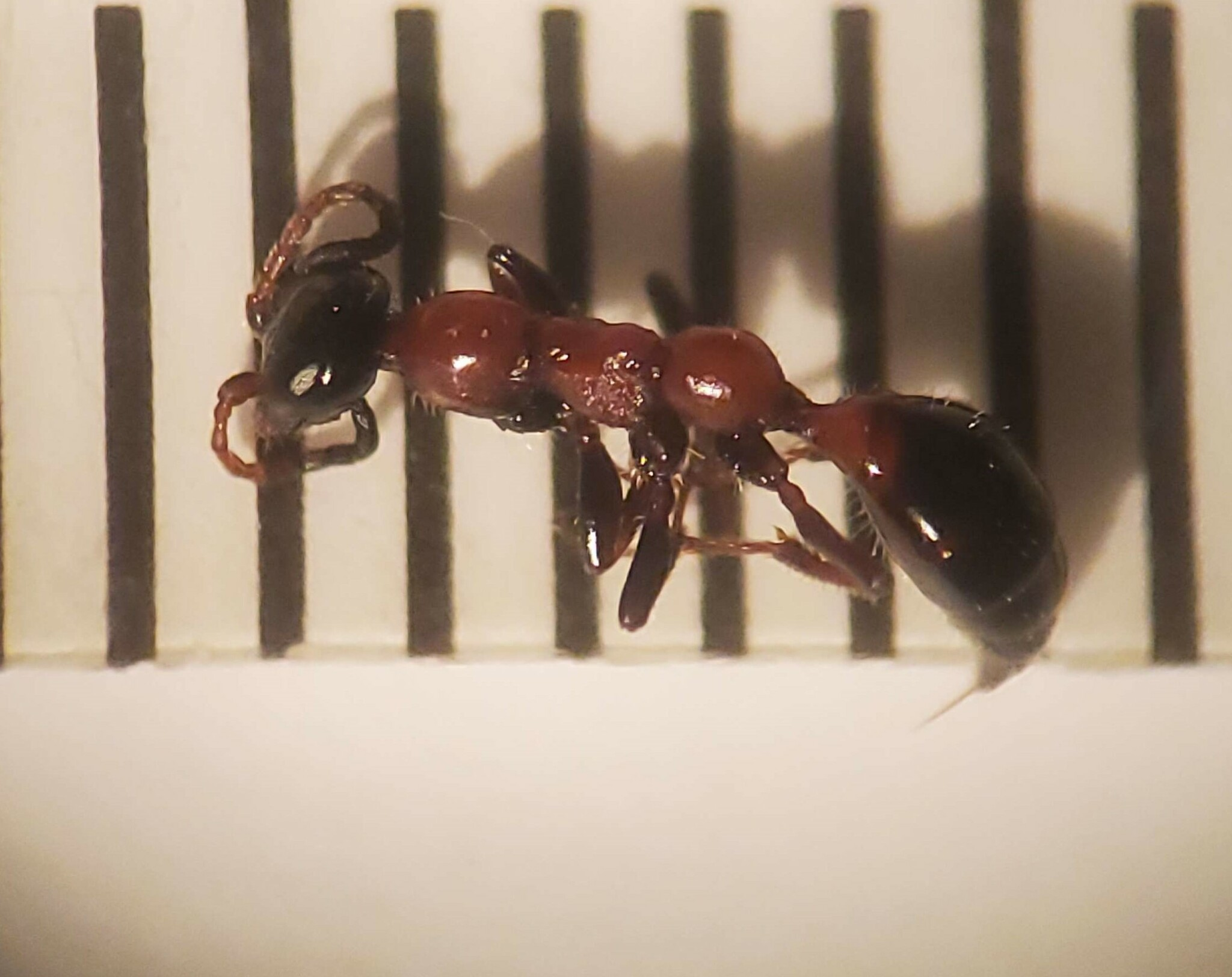
Methocha stygia

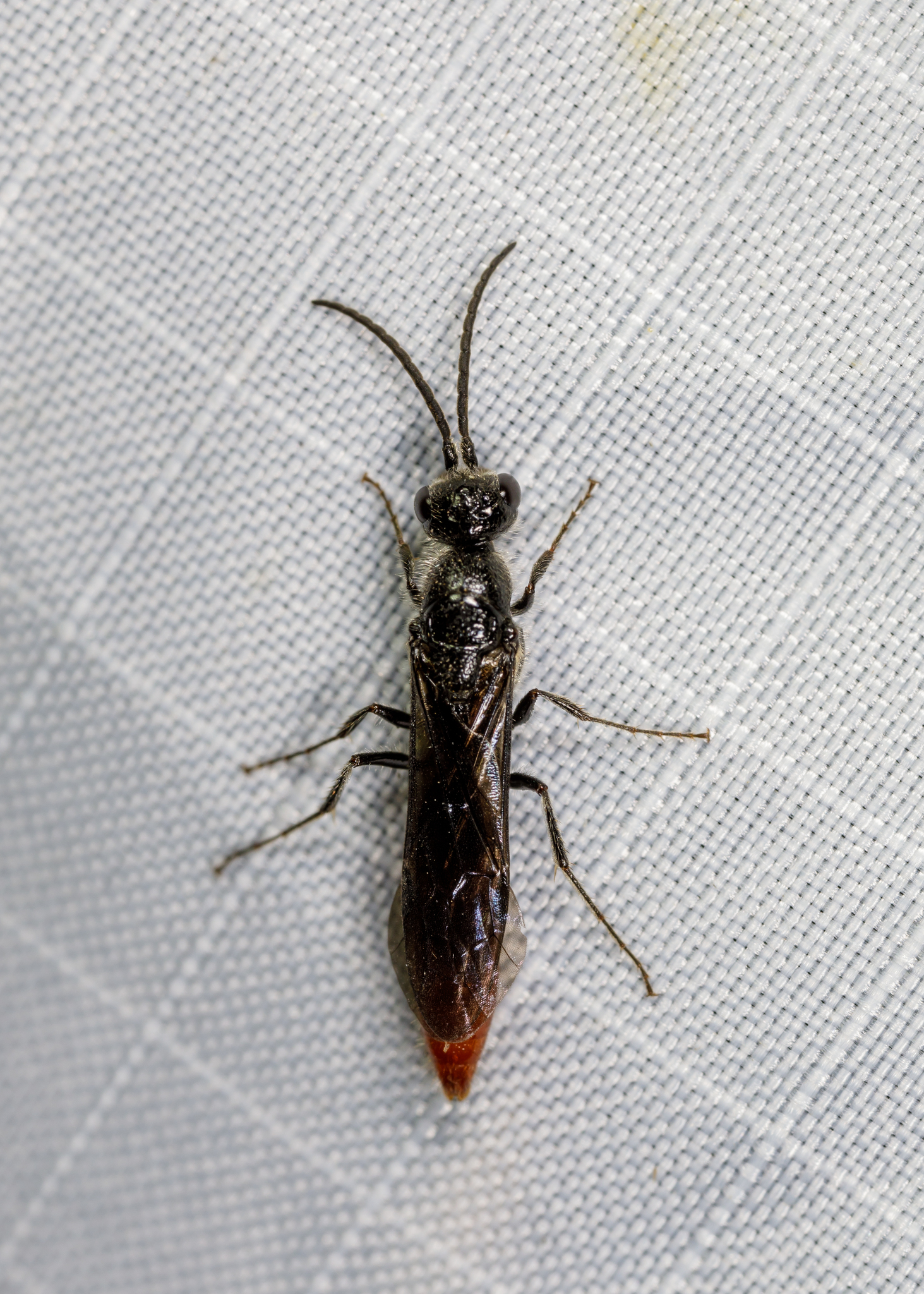
Pterombrus rufiventris
