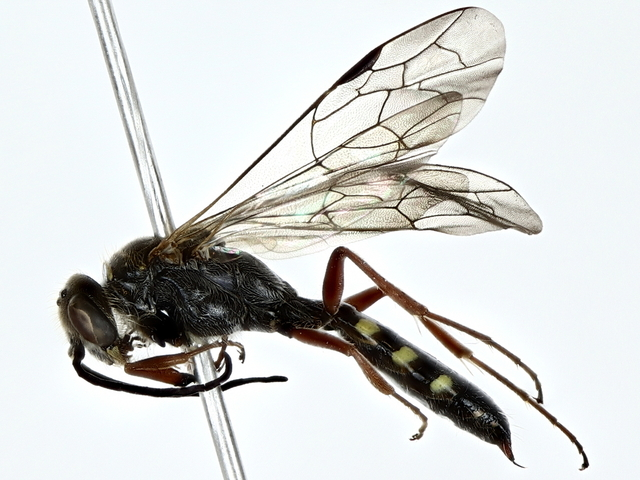

Scientific classification
- Kingdom: Animalia
- Phylum: Arthropoda
- Class: Insecta
- Order: Hymenoptera
- Family: Thynnidae
- Subfamily: Thynninae
- Genus: Neozeleboria; Rohwer, 1910

Type species
- Neozeleboria sexmaculata (Smith, 1859)

Synonyms
- Zeleboria Turner, 1910 (partial)

= Neozeleboria =

Genus of wasps

Neozeleboria is a genus of thynnid wasp in the order Hymenoptera, first described in 1910 by Sievert Allen Rohwer. The type species is Thynnus sexmaculata Smith, 1859.

== Species ==
Species found in Australia are:

- Neozeleboria ada (Turner, 1908)
- Neozeleboria alexandri Turner, 1915
- Neozeleboria calcaratus (Smith, 1859)
- Neozeleboria carinicollis Turner, 1915
- Neozeleboria compar (Turner, 1910)
- Neozeleboria cryptoides (Smith, 1959)
- Neozeleboria femoratus (Turner, 1908)
- Neozeleboria flavicoxa Brown, 1998
- Neozeleboria lacteimaculata Turner, 1914
- Neozeleboria adelpha Turner, 1940
- Neozeleboria laevifrons (Smith, 1859)
- Neozeleboria longicornis (Turner, 1908)
- Neozeleboria monticola (Turner, 1909)
- Neozeleboria nitidula (Turner, 1908)
- Neozeleboria olivei (Turner, 1910)
- Neozeleboria polita (Turner, 1908)
- Neozeleboria proxima (Turner, 1908)
- Neozeleboria rarum Brown, 1998
- Neozeleboria rufum Brown, 1998
- Neozeleboria sexmaculata (Smith, 1859)
- Neozeleboria sodalis (Turner, 1908)
- Neozeleboria tabulata Brown, 1998
- Neozeleboria trivialis (Smith, 1859)
- Neozeleboria impatiens Smith, 1879
- Neozeleboria usitatum Brown, 1998
- Neozeleboria volatilis (Smith, 1859)
