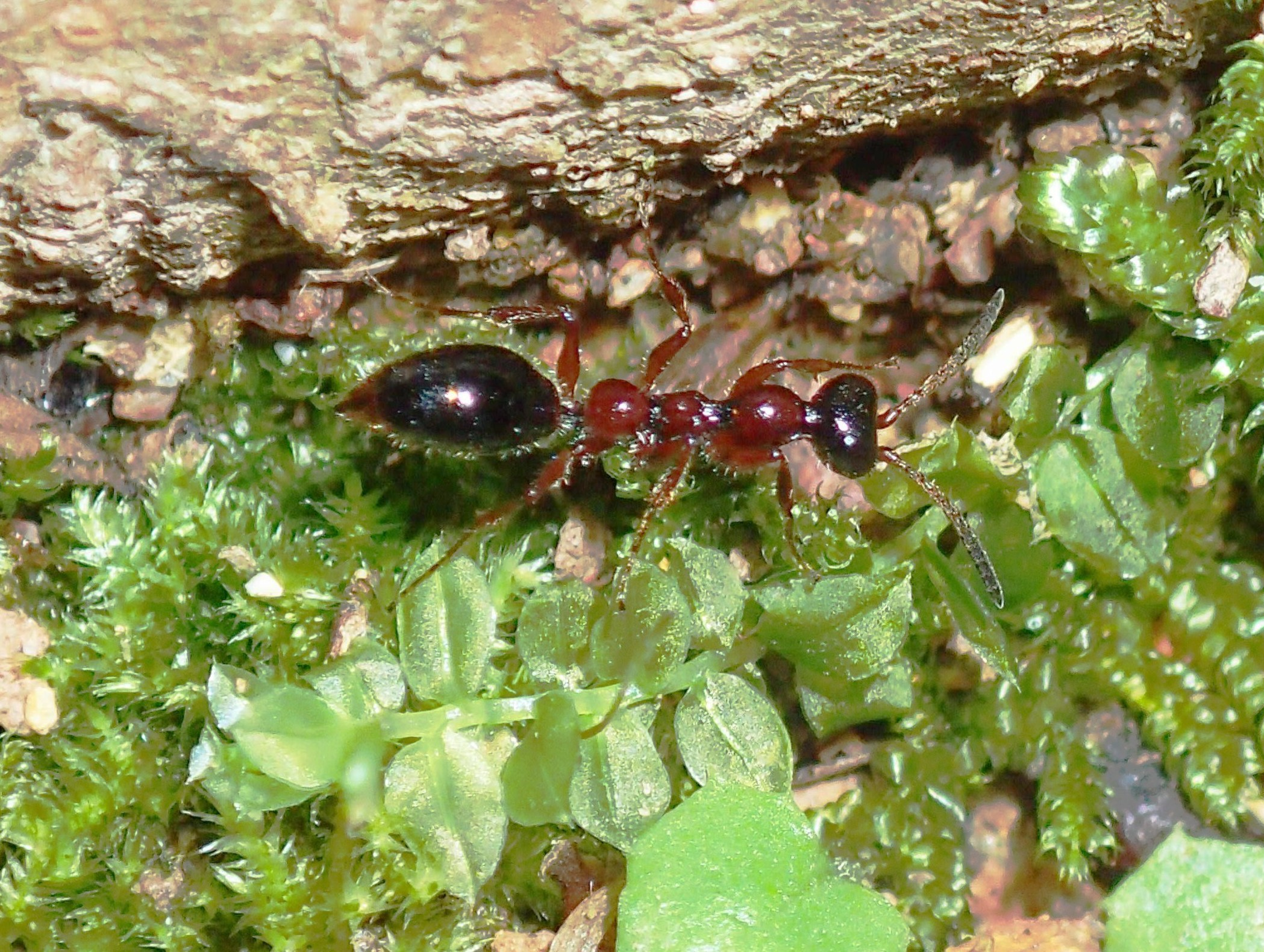
- Methocha yasumatsui ♀（Japan）

Scientific classification
- Kingdom: Animalia
- Phylum: Arthropoda
- Clade: Pancrustacea
- Class: Insecta
- Order: Hymenoptera
- Family: Thynnidae
- Subfamily: Methochinae
- Genus: Methocha; Latreille, 1804

= Methocha =

Genus of insects

Methocha is a genus of parasitoid wasps in the family Thynnidae.

The species of this genus are found worldwide except in Australia, and attack the larvae of tiger beetles. Females are wingless, and can be mistaken for ants, while males are winged.

== Biology ==
Female Methocha actively hunt over the ground for burrows containing tiger beetle larvae, which are ambush predators; the wasp entices the beetle larva into attacking, evades being bitten, and quickly moves in and stings the larva in its vulnerable underside, paralyzing it. It then lays an egg on the immobile beetle larva, and the wasp larva consumes it.

== Species ==
- Methocha alutacea Linnaeus
- Methocha anomala Krombein
- Methocha californica Westwood, 1881
- Methocha cariniventris Narita & Mita, 2018
- Methocha formosa Krombein, 1954
- Methocha granulosa Narita & Mita, 2018
- Methocha ichneumonides Latreille, 1804
- Methocha impolita Krombein, 1958
- Methocha japonica (Yasumatsu, 1931)
- Methocha krombeini Raveendram, Kumar, Binoy, & Sureshan, 2021
- Methocha michinoku Terayamma, 2019
- Methocha okinawensis Terayamma & Mita, 2015
- Methocha paraceylonica Raveendram, Kumar, Binoy, & Sureshan, 2021
- Methocha shyamagatra Raveendram, Kumar, Binoy, & Sureshan, 2021
- Methocha stygia (Say, 1836)
- Methocha uchinanensis Terayamma & Mita, 2015
- Methocha yaeyamensis Terayamma & Mita, 2015
- Methocha yasumatsui (Iwata, 1936)
