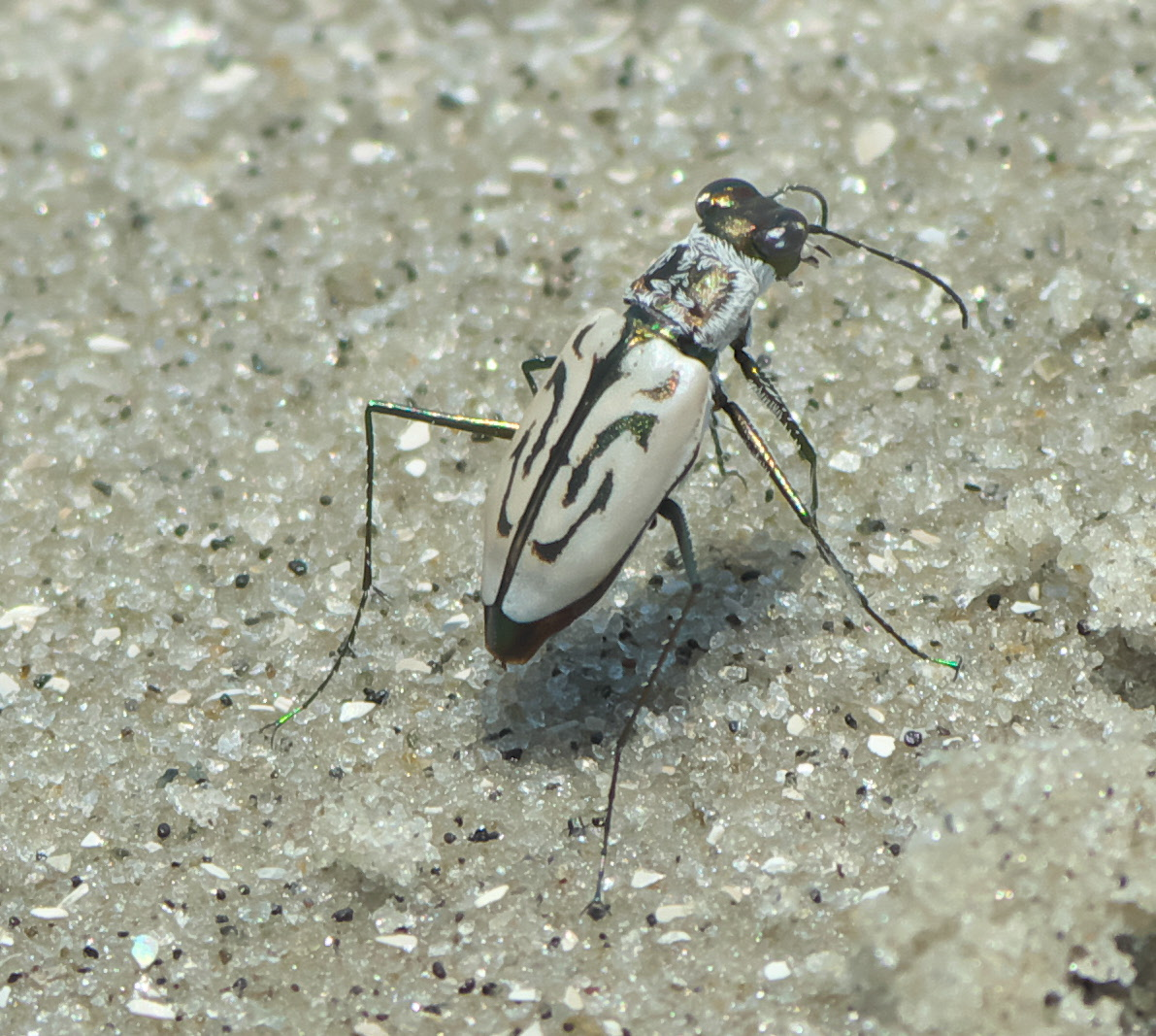
- Habroscelimorpha dorsalis media

Scientific classification
- Kingdom: Animalia
- Phylum: Arthropoda
- Class: Insecta
- Order: Coleoptera
- Suborder: Adephaga
- Family: Cicindelidae
- Tribe: Cicindelini
- Genus: Habroscelimorpha; Dokhtouroff, 1883

= Habroscelimorpha =

Genus of beetles

Habroscelimorpha is a genus in the beetle family Cicindelidae. There are about seven described species in Habroscelimorpha.

== Species ==
These seven species belong to the genus Habroscelimorpha:

- Habroscelimorpha auraria (Klug, 1834) (the Lesser Antilles, Colombia, Venezuela, Panama, and Costa Rica)
- Habroscelimorpha boops (Dejean, 1831) (the Lesser Antilles, Hispaniola, and Cuba)
- Habroscelimorpha curvata (Chevrolat, 1834) (Mexico)
- Habroscelimorpha dorsalis (Say, 1817) (United States, Mexico, and Cuba)
- Habroscelimorpha euryscopa (Bates, 1890) (Nicaragua, El Salvador, and Mexico)
- Habroscelimorpha schwarzi (W.Horn, 1923) (Colombia, Panama, and Costa Rica)
- Habroscelimorpha wellingi Cassola & Sawada, 1990 (Mexico)
