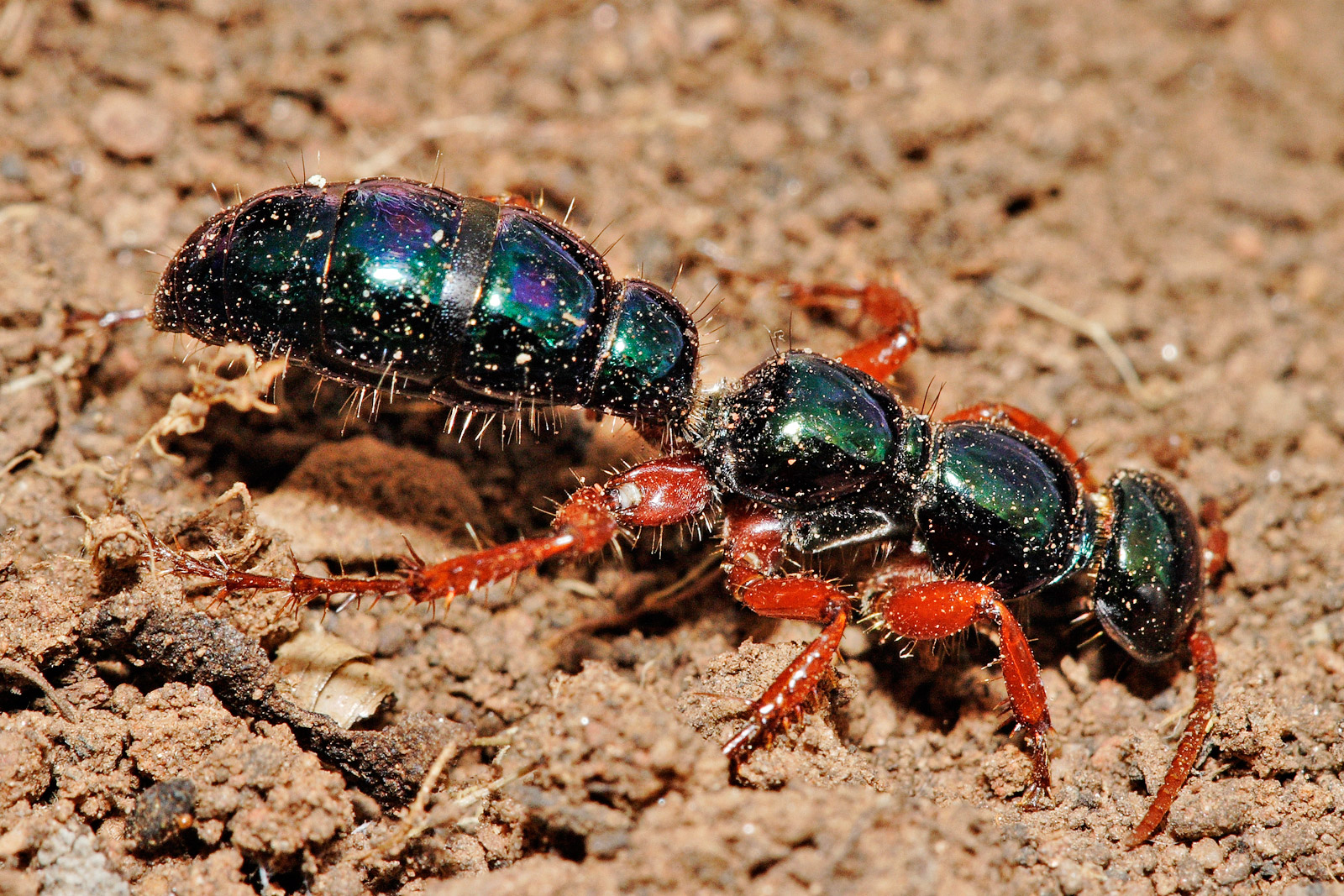
- Female

Scientific classification
- Kingdom: Animalia
- Phylum: Arthropoda
- Class: Insecta
- Order: Hymenoptera
- Family: Thynnidae
- Subfamily: Diamminae
- Genus: Diamma
- Species: D. bicolor

Binomial name
- Diamma bicolor Westwood, 1835

= Blue ant =

Species of insect endemic to Australia

The blue ant (Diamma bicolor), also known as the blue-ant or bluebottle, is a species of flower wasp in the family Thynnidae. It is the sole member of the genus Diamma and of the subfamily Diamminae. Despite its common name and wingless body, it is not an ant but rather a species of large, solitary, parasitic wasp.

== Distribution ==
The blue ant is endemic to south and southeast Australia, including the states of Tasmania, New South Wales, Victoria, and South Australia.

== Description and identification ==
Blue ants have a distinctive metallic blue-green body, with red legs. The female ranges up to 25 mm (1 in) in length, and is wingless. The male is smaller, about 15 mm (5/8 in), and has wings.

== Biology ==
Blue ants are ground-nesting. They are unusual among members of the family Thynnidae in exclusively hunting mole crickets as larval provisions, whereas all other species of thynnids attack beetle larvae. The cricket is paralysed with venom injected by the female's stinger and an egg is laid upon it so the wasp larva has a ready supply of food.

Adults feed on nectar and pollinate various native Australian flowers, such as Lomatia silaifolia.

They are fast-moving and burrow under leaves to escape danger. They do not show aggression unless provoked.

== Gallery ==
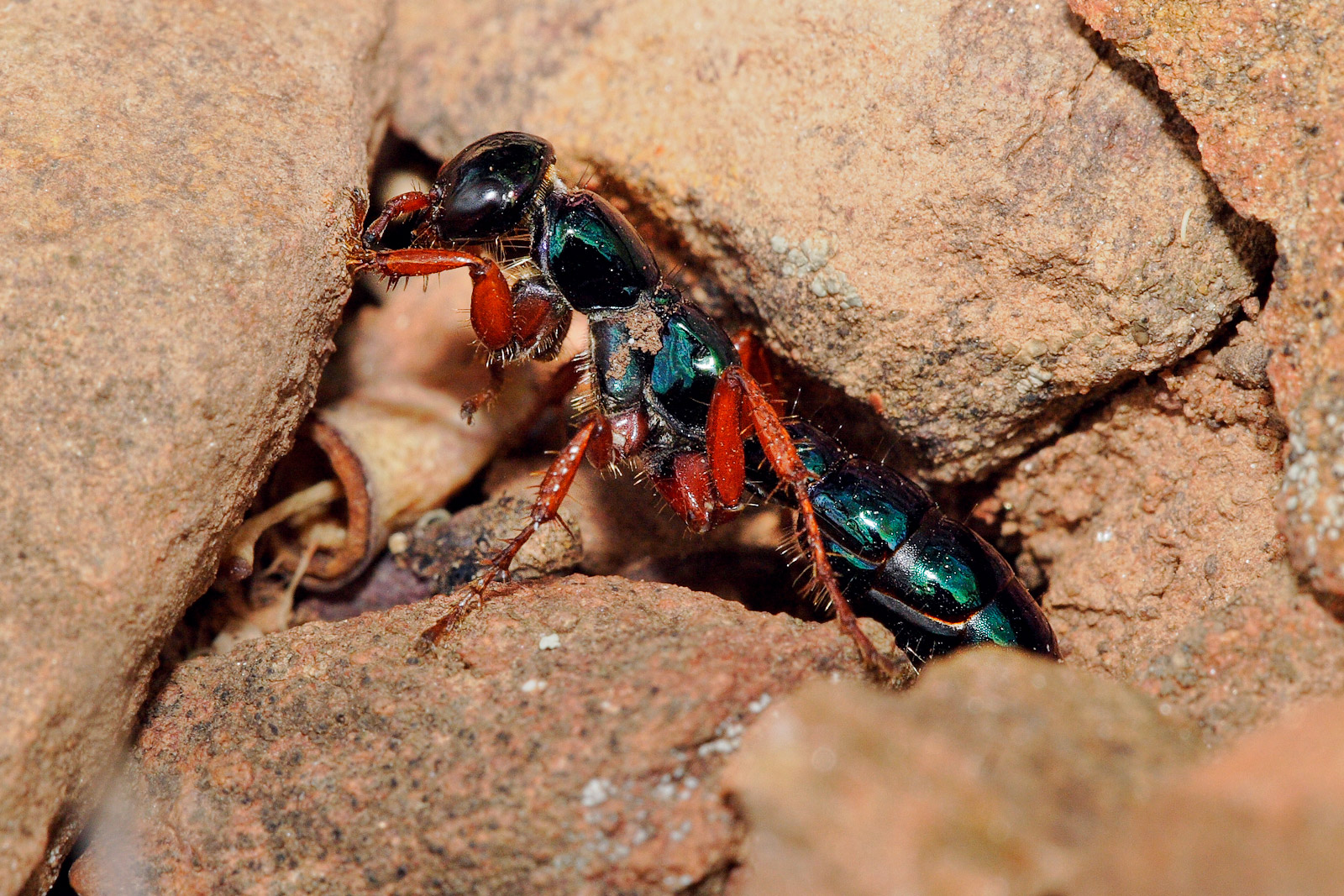
Blue ant female

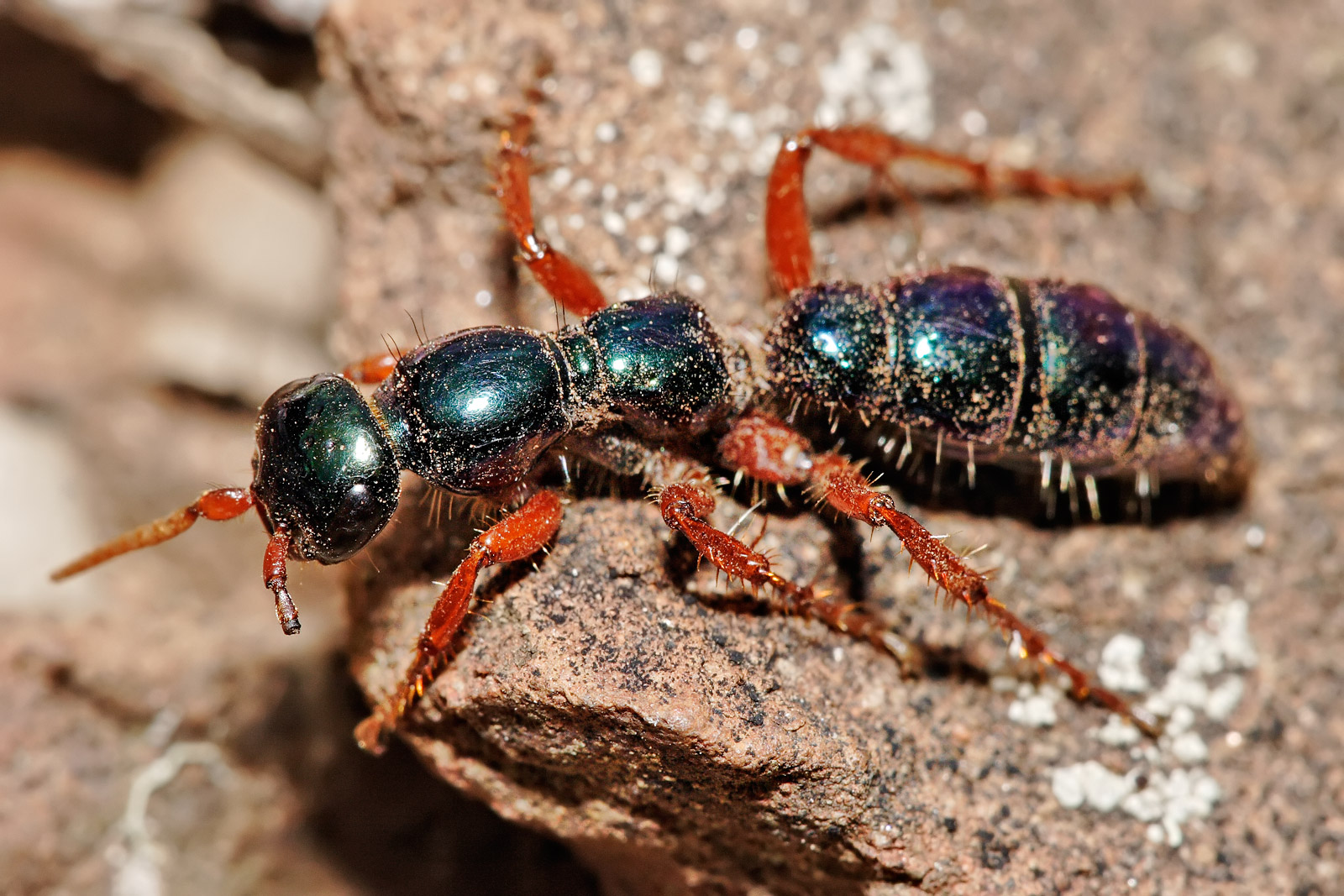
Blue ant female with damaged antennae

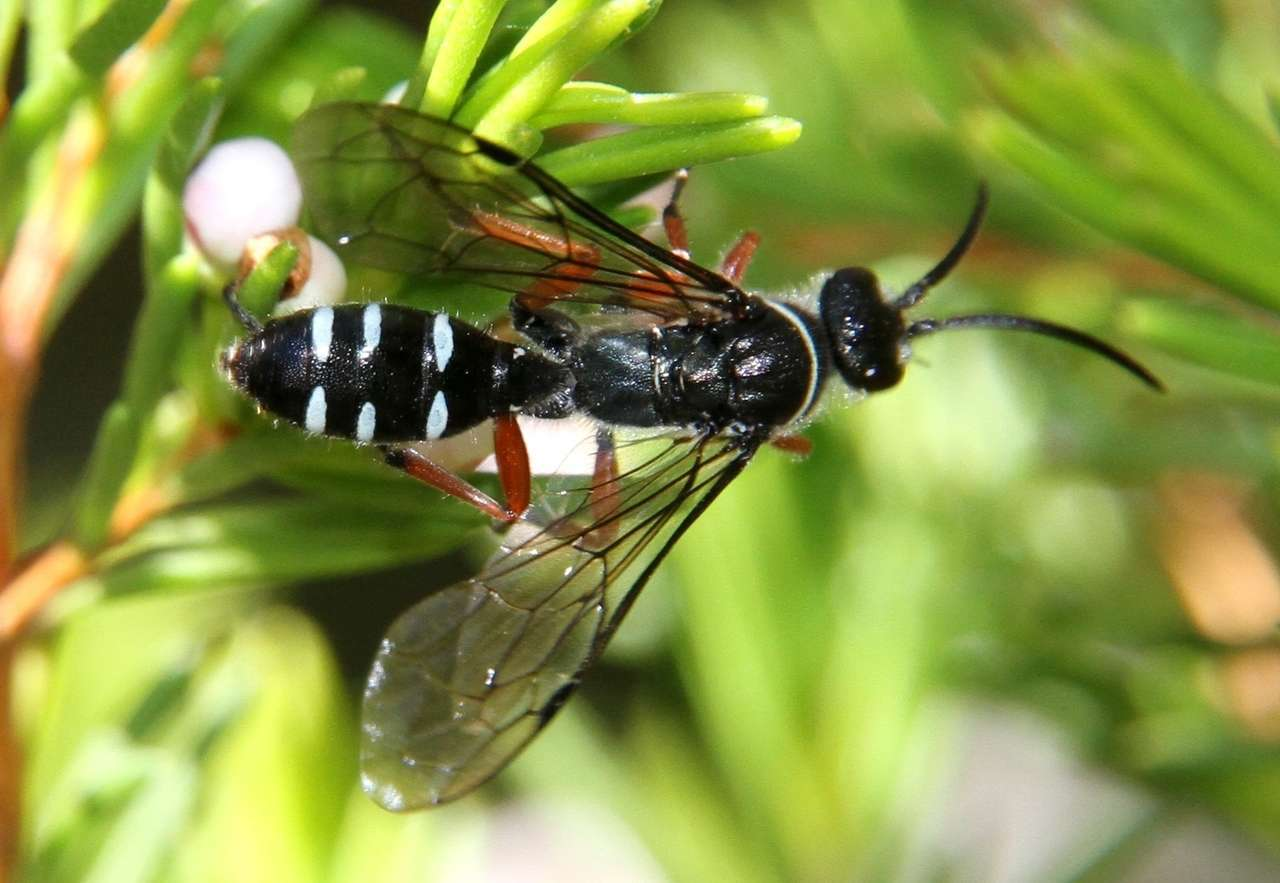
Blue ant male
