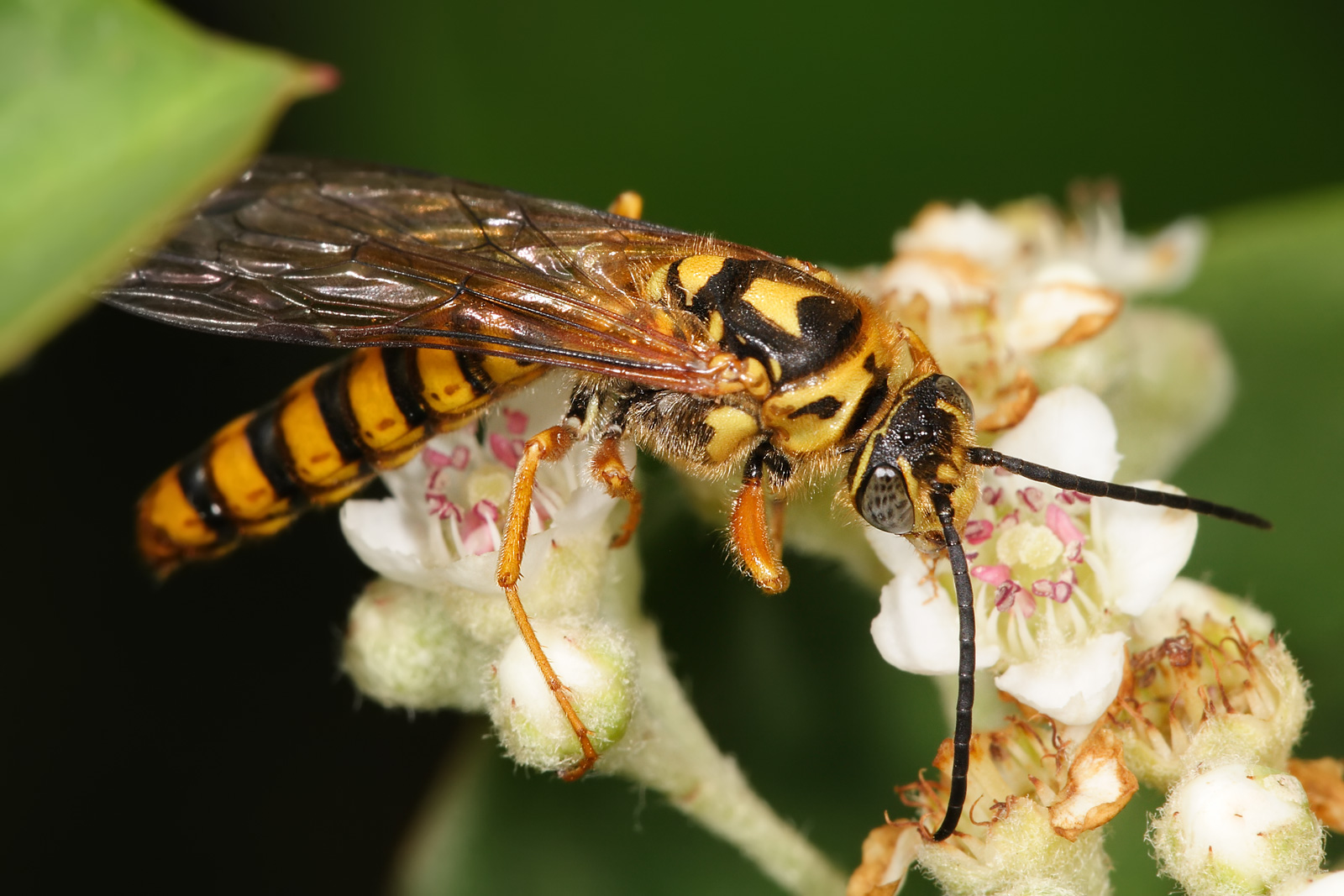
- Male Elidothynnus melleus feeding on nectar

Scientific classification
- Kingdom: Animalia
- Phylum: Arthropoda
- Clade: Pancrustacea
- Class: Insecta
- Order: Hymenoptera
- Superfamily: Thynnoidea
- Family: Thynnidae; Shuckard, 1841

Subfamilies
- Anthoboscinae Turner, 1912; Diamminae Turner, 1907; Methochinae Rohwer, 1916; Myzininae Borner, 1919; Thynninae Ashmead, 1903

= Thynnidae =

Family of insects

The Thynnidae (also known as thynnid wasps, flower wasps, or thynnid flower wasps) are a family of large, solitary wasps whose larvae are almost universally parasitoids of various beetle larvae, especially those in the superfamily Scarabaeoidea. Until recently, the constituents of this family were classified in the family Tiphiidae, but multiple studies have independently confirmed that thynnids are a separate lineage.

== Description ==
Most species are small, but they can be up to 30 mm long. The females of some subfamilies (Diamminae, Methochinae, and most Thynninae) are wingless and hunt ground-dwelling (fossorial) beetle larvae, or (in one species) mole crickets. The prey is paralysed with the female's sting, and an egg is laid on it so the wasp larva has a ready supply of food. In species where both sexes are winged, males are similar in size to the females, but are much more slender. The males of species with wingless females, however, are often much larger than the females and have wings; the adults mate in the air, with the female carried by the male's genitalia. Adults feed on nectar and are minor pollinators. As some of the ground-dwelling scarab species attacked by thynnids are pests, some of these wasps are considered beneficial as biological control agents.

== Taxonomy ==
The family has five extant subfamilies, which were previously placed in Tiphiidae before it was found to be non-monophyletic. Thynnidae genera are classified as follows:

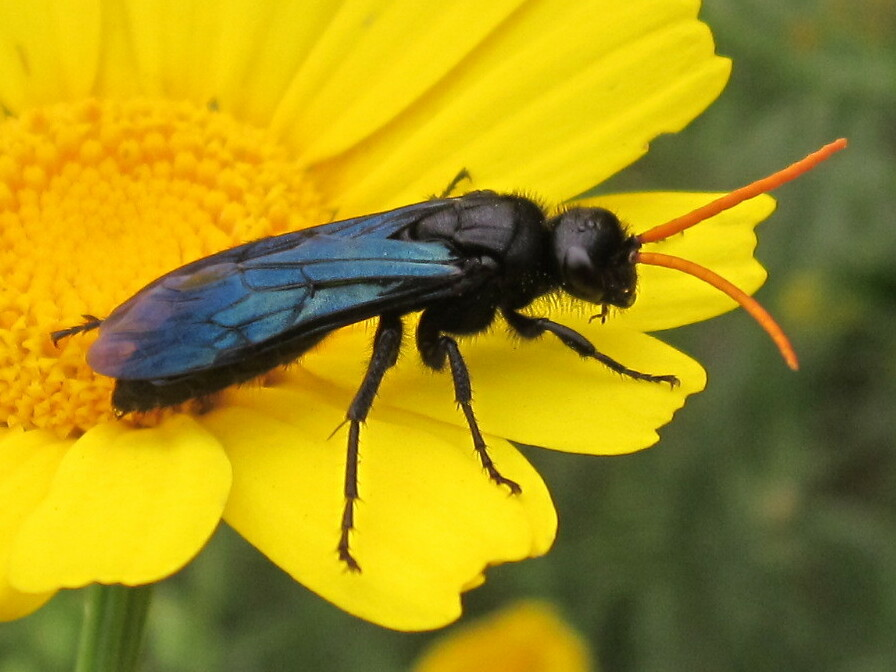
Cosila chilensis (subfamily Anthoboscinae) photographed in Chile

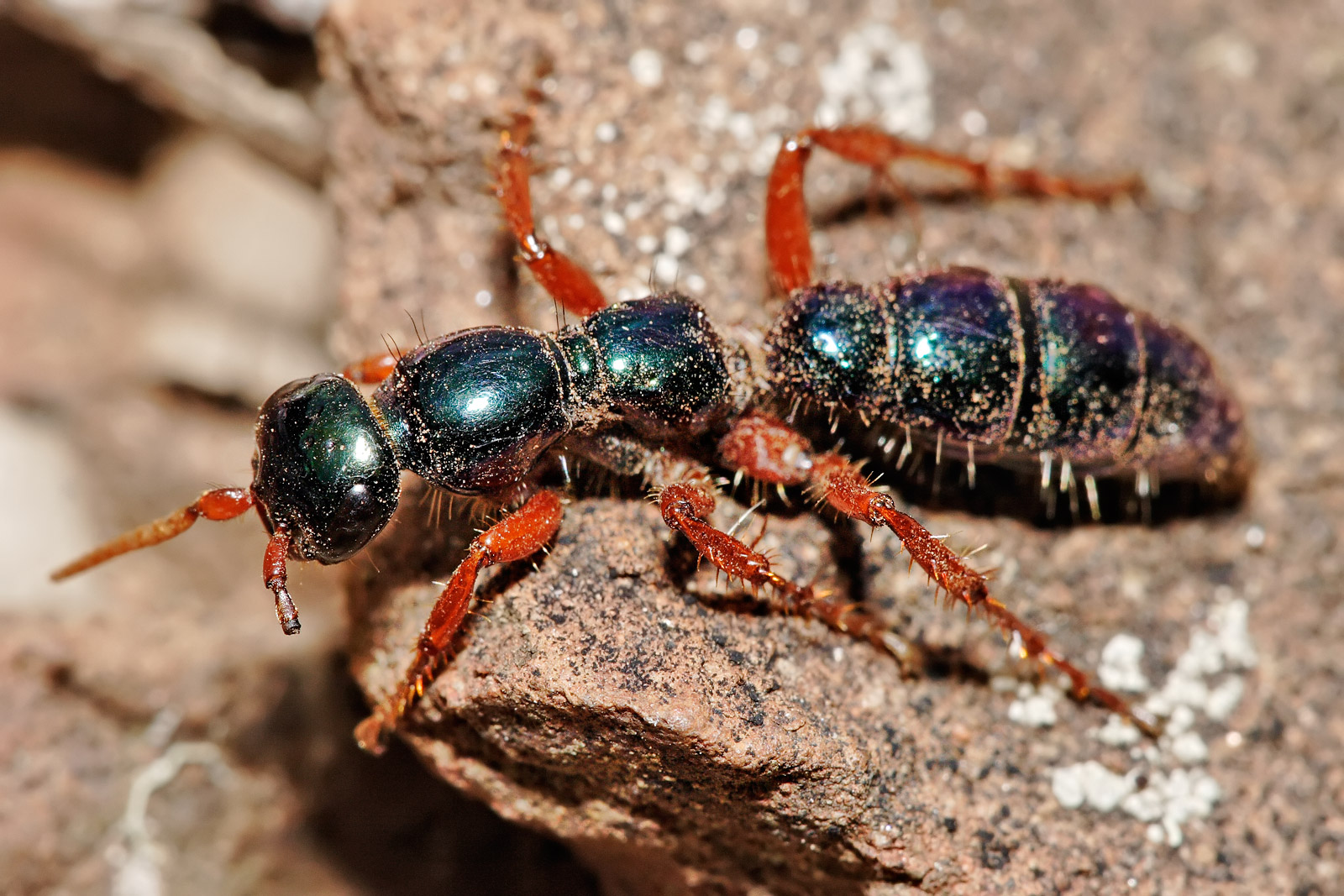
Diamma bicolor female (subfamily Diamminae) photographed in Australia

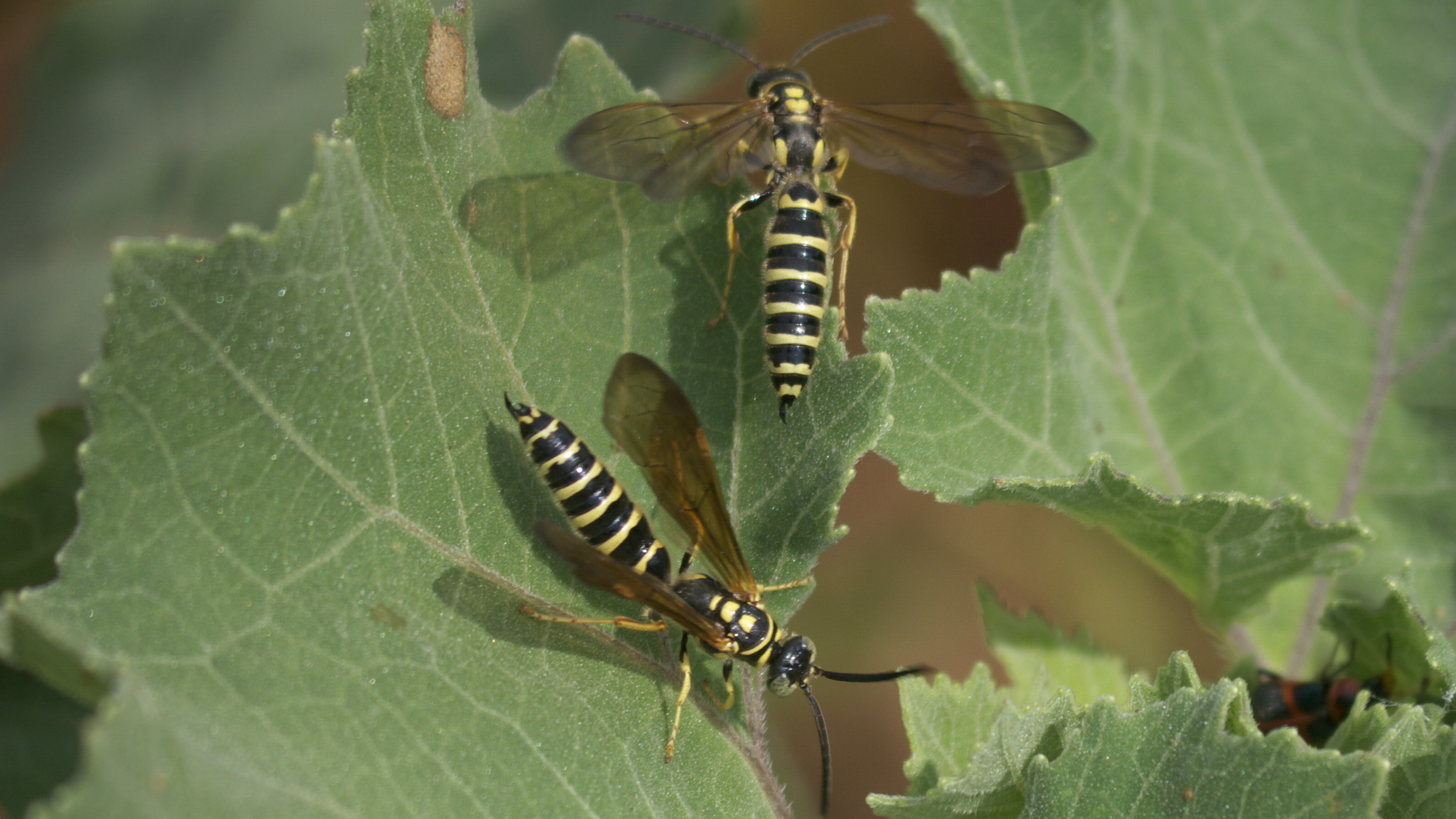
Myzinum quinquecinctum males (subfamily Myzininae) photographed in Oklahoma.

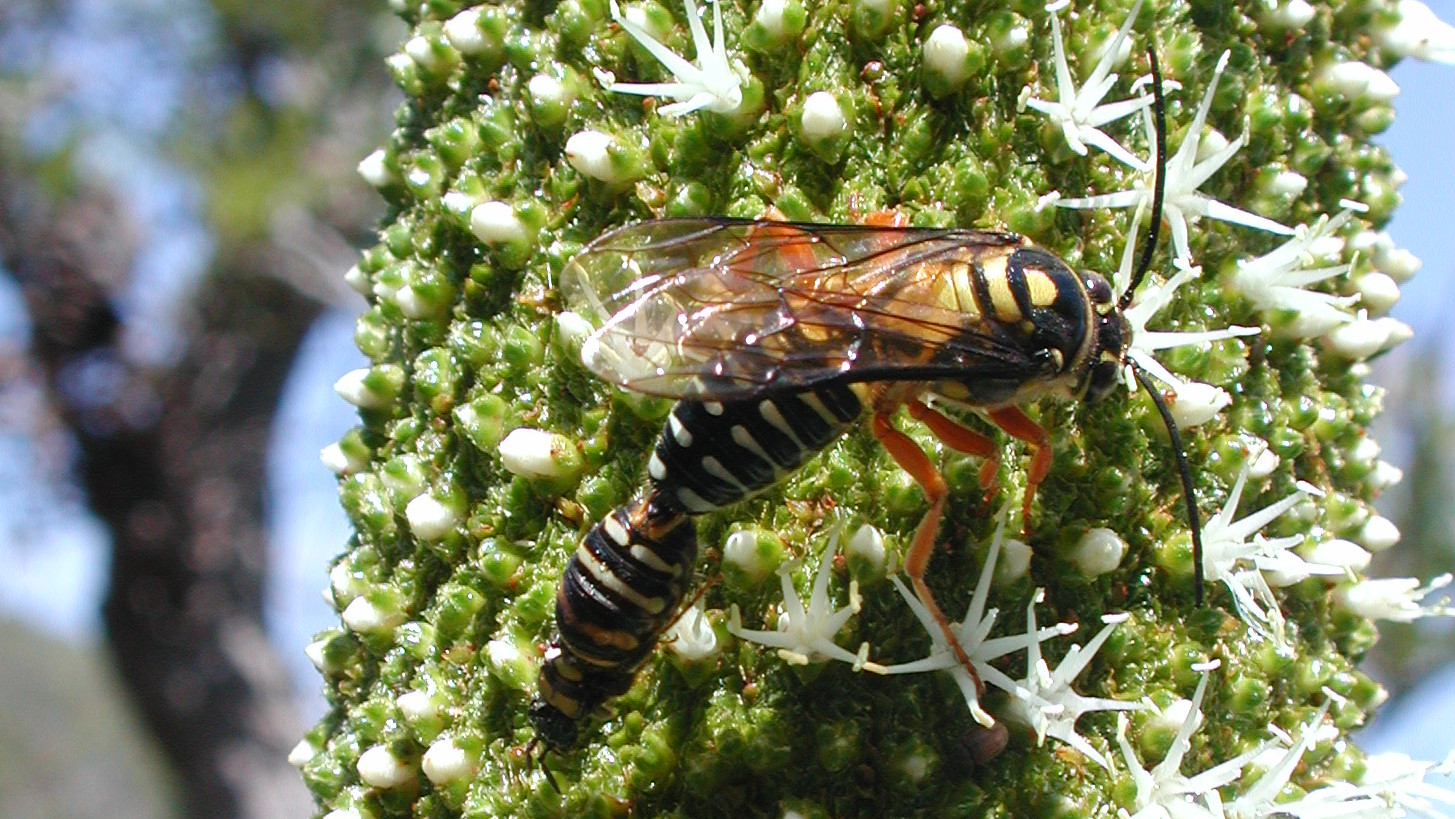
A pair of Zaspilothynnus sp. mating (subfamily Thynninae), photographed in Australia: The male is larger and has wings.

=== Extant genera ===
==== Subfamily: Anthoboscinae Turner, 1912 ====
- Anthobosca Guérin-Ménéville, 1838
- Anthosila Genise, 1985
- Calchaquila Genise, 1985
- Cosila Guérin-Méneville, 1838
- Lalapa Pate, 1947
- Odontothynnus Cameron, 1904
- Paramyzine Berg, 1898

==== Subfamily: Diamminae Turner, 1907 ====
- Diamma Westwood, 1835

==== Subfamily: Methochinae Rohwer, 1916 ====
- Methocha Latreille, 1804
- Pterombrus Smith, 1869

==== Subfamily: Myzininae Borner, 1919 ====
===== Tribe: Austromyzinini =====
- Austromyzinum Brown, 1985
- Cleftomyzinum Brown, 1985

===== Tribe: Myzinini =====
- Myzinum Latreille, 1803

===== Tribe: Mesini Argaman, 1994 =====
- Mesa Saussure, 1892
- Hylomesa Krombein, 1968

===== Tribe: Meriini Costa, 1858 =====
- Afromeria Boni Bartalucci, 2007
- Allomeria Boni Bartalucci, 2007
- Braunsomeria Turner, 1912
- Iswara Westwood, 1851
- Komarowia Radoszkowski, 1886
- Lamprowara Boni Bartalucci, 2004
- Macromeria Westwood, 1835
- Meria Illiger, 1807
- Meriodes Boni Bartalucci, 2007
- Myzinella Guiglia, 1959
- Notomeria Boni Bartalucci, 2011
- Parameria Guérin-Méneville, 1837
- Poecilotiphia Cameron, 1902
- Tamerlanella Boni Bartalucci, 2004
- Weerpaga Argaman, 1994
- Zezelda Argaman, 1994

==== Subfamily: Thynninae Ashmead, 1903 ====
===== Tribe: Agriomyini Brown, 2025 =====
- Aeolothynnus Ashmead, 1903
- Agriomyia Guérin-Ménéville, 1838
- Aulacothynnus Turner, 1910
- Chilothynnus Brown, 1996
- Dythynnus Kimsey, 2001
- Gyrothynnus Brown, 2005
- Leiothynnus Turner, 1910
- Neozeleboria Rohwer, 1910
- Nitidothynnus Brown, 2001
- Pentazeleboria Brown, 1983
- Procerothynnus Brown, 2001
- Psammothynnus Ashmead, 1903
- Sinothynnus Brown, 2025
- Zeleboria Saussure, 1867

===== Tribe: Elaphropterini Kimsey, 1992 =====
- Ammodromus Guérin-Méneville, 1838
- Argenthynnus Genise, 1991
- Atopothynnus Kimsey, 1991
- Brethynnus Genise, 1991
- Chrysothynnus Turner, 1910
- Dolichothynnus Turner, 1910
- Elaphroptera Guérin-Ménéville, 1838
- Eucyrtothynnus Turner, 1910
- Merithynnus Kimsey, 1991
- Mesothynnus Kimsey, 1991
- Spilothynnus Ashmead, 1903
- Telephorornyia Guérin-Ménéville, 1838
- Upa Kimsey, 1991
- Zeena Kimsey, 1991

===== Tribe: Iswaroidini Brown, 2025 =====
- Acanthothynnus Turner, 1910
- Arthrothynnus Brown, 1996
- Aspidothynnus Turner, 1910
- Beithynnus Kimsey, 2002
- Caetrathynnus Brown, 2001
- Doratithynnus Turner, 1910
- Encopothynnus Turner, 1915
- Epactiothynnus Turner, 1910
- Eurysothynnus Brown, 2025
- Flatrothynnus Brown, 2025
- Gymnothynnus Turner, 1910
- Iswaroides Ashmead, 1899
- Jocothynnus Brown, 2025
- Mulctothynnus Brown, 2025
- Pappothynnus Brown, 2025
- Quirithynnus Brown, 2025
- Rostrothynnus Brown, 2025
- Thynnoturneria Rohwer, 1910
- Tmesothynnus Turner, 1910
- Ypsilothynnus Brown, 2025

===== Tribe: Rhagigasterini Ashmead, 1903 =====
- Curvothynnus Brown, 2010
- Dimorphothynnus Turner, 1910
- Eirone Westwood, 1844
- Rhagigaster Guérin-Ménéville, 1838
- Rugosothynnus Brown, 2015
- Rhytidothynnus Brown, 2008
- Umbothynnus Brown, 2008
- Zonothynnus Brown, 2025

===== Tribe: Scotaenini Kimsey, 1992 =====
- Anodontyra Westwood 1835
- Glottynnus Genise, 1991
- Glottynoides Kimsey, 1991
- Kaysara Carnimeo & Noll, 2018
- Ornepetes Guérin, 1838
- Pampathynnus Carnimeo & Noll, 2018
- Parelaphroptera Turner, 1910
- Pseudelaphroptera Ashmead, 1903
- Pseudoscotaena Carnimeo & Noll, 2018
- Rostrynnus Genise, 1991
- Scotaena Klug, 1810

===== Tribe: Tachynomyini Brown, 2025 =====
- Ariphron Kimsey, 2007
- Deuterothynnus Brown, 2005
- Heligmothynnus Brown, 2005
- Phymatothynnus Turner, 1908
- Tachynoides Kimsey, 1996
- Tachynomyia Guérin-Ménéville, 1842
- Tachyphron Brown, 1995
- Wrangathynnus Brown, 2025

===== Tribe: Thynnini Ashmead, 1903 =====
- Amblysoma Westwood, 1841
- Anpogothynnus Brown, 2025
- Belothynnus Turner, 1910
- Bifidothynnus Brown, 1992
- Campylothynnus Turner, 1910
- Catocheilus Guérin-Ménéville, 1842
- Elidothynnus Turner, 1910
- Guerinius Ashmead, 1903
- Hathynnus Kimsey, 2003
- Hemithynnus Ashmead, 1903
- Insolitothynnus Brown, 2025
- Keteiothynnus Brown, 2025
- Leptothynnus Turner, 1910
- Lestricothynnus Turner, 1910
- Levothynnus Brown, 2025
- Lophocheilus Guérin-Ménéville, 1842
- Macrothynnus Turner, 1908
- Megalothynnus Turner, 1910
- Oncorhinothynnus Salter, 1954
- Ozaspothynnus Brown, 2025
- Pogonothynnus Turner, 1910
- Thynnoides Guérin-Ménéville, 1838
- Thynnus Fabricius, 1775
- Vehemenothynnus Brown, 2025
- Zaspilothynnus Ashmead, 1903
- Zythynnus Kimsey, 2001

=== Extinct genera ===
The following 4 genera are extinct members of Thynnidae:

==== Subfamily: Anthoboscinae Turner, 1912 ====
- †Architiphia Darling, 1990

==== Subfamily: Methochinae Rohwer, 1916 ====
- †Brachymethoca Zhang, 1989

==== Subfamily: Myzininae Borner, 1919 ====
- †Geotiphia Cockerell, 1906
- †Lithotiphia Cockerell, 1906
