= List of Virginia placenames of Native American origin =

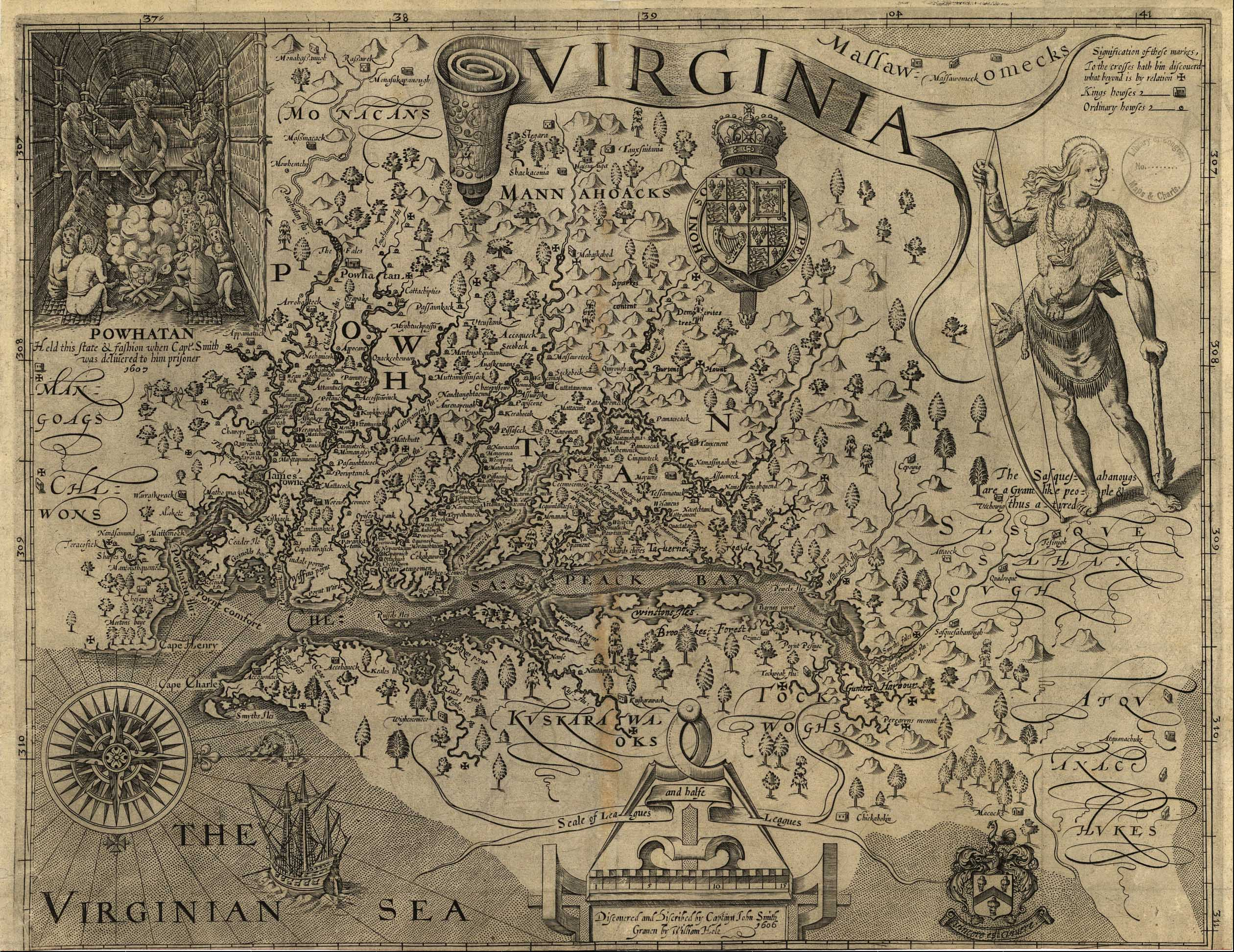
Some of the current place names of Native American origin in present-day Virginia and Maryland can be found recorded on Capt. John Smith's 1612 map of the region

This is a list of Native American place names in the U.S. state of Virginia.

== Listings ==
=== Counties ===
- Accomack County
- Alleghany County
  - Alleghany
  - Alleghany Springs
  - Alleghany Mountain
- Appomattox County
  - Town of Appomattox
  - Appomattox River
  - Appomattox-Buckingham State Forest
- Nottoway County
  - Village of Nottoway
  - District of Nottaway
  - Nottoway River
  - Little Nottoway River
  - Nottoway Lake
  - Nottoway Swamp
- Powhatan County – named after the Powhatan people.
  - Powhatan State Park
  - Powhatan Wildlife Management Area
- Rappahannock County
  - Rappahannock River
  - Rappahannock Mountain
- Roanoke County
  - City of Roanoke
  - District of Roanoke
  - Roanoke River
  - Roanoke Creek
  - Roanoke Valley
  - Roanoke Mountain
- Shenandoah County
  - Shenandoah River
  - North Fork Shenandoah River
  - South Fork Shenandoah River
  - Shenandoah River State Park
  - Shenandoah Mountain
  - Shenandoah Caverns
  - Shenandoah Valley
  - Shenandoah National Park

=== Settlements ===
- Accotink
  - Lake Accotink
  - Accotink Creek
- Accomac
- Achash
- Alcoma
- Amonate
- Appalachia
- Aquia
  - Aquia Harbour
- Assawoman
- Atoka
  - Atoka Historic District
- Cana
- Canada
- Catalpa
- Chesapeake
  - Chesapeake Bay
- Chickahominy – named after the Chickahominy people.
  - Chickahominy (Hanover County)
  - Chickahominy River
  - Chickahominy Wildlife Management Area
- Chilhowie
- Chincoteague
  - Chincoteague Island
  - Chincoteague National Wildlife Refuge
- Elko Tract
- Hiwassee
- Keokee
- Konnarock
- Marumsco – from the Algonquin word for "island rock".
- Massanetta Springs
- Matoaca – after Pocahontas's birthname, Matoaka.
  - District of Matoaca
- Massanutten
  - Massanutten Mountain
- Massaponax
- Mattaponi – named after the Mattaponi people.
  - Mattaponi River
  - Mattaponi Wildlife Management Area
  - Mattaponi Bluffs Wildlife Management Area
- Meherrin – named after the Meherrin people.
  - Meherrin River
  - North Meherrin River
  - Middle Meherrin River
  - South Meherrin River
- Merrimac
- Metompkin
  - Metompkin Island
- Nassawadox
- Occoquan
  - Occoquan River
  - Occoquan Creek
  - Occoquan Reservoir
  - Occoquan Bay National Wildlife Refuge
- Onancock
- Opequon
- Oriskany
- Passapatanzy
- Pocahontas
  - Pocahontas State Park
- Poquoson
  - Poquoson River
- Potomac Yard
  - Potomac Mills
  - Potomac River
  - Potomac Creek
  - Potomac Water Gap
- Pungoteague – from Algonquin word "Pungotekw", meaning "sand fly river".
- Quantico
  - Quantico Creek
- Seneca
  - Seneca River
- Shawnee
- Shockoe Bottom
  - Shockoe Hill
  - Shockoe Slip
  - Upper Shockoe Valley
  - Shockoe Creek
- Tappahannock
- Tobacco Row
- Totaro
  - District of Totaro
- Tuckahoe
  - District of Tuckahoe
- Wachapreague
- Wingina
- Zuni

=== Bodies of water ===
- Accokeek Creek
- Assamoosick Swamp
- Big Moccasin Creek
- Catawba Creek
- Catoctin Creek
  - North Fork Catoctin Creek
  - South Fork Catoctin Creek
- Chopawamsic Creek
- Chotank Creek
  - Chotank Creek Natural Area Preserve
- Chuckatuck Creek
- Corrotoman River
- Diascund Creek
  - Diascund Reservoir
- Dogue Creek
- Great Wicomico River
- Hyco River
- Keokee Lake
- Lake Manassas
- Little Wicomico River
- Mattox Creek
- Machipongo River
- Maracossic Creek
- Mat River
- Matta River
- Mechums River
- Mechunk Creek
- Namozine Creek
- Nansemond River – named after the Nansemond people.
  - Nansemond National Wildlife Refuge
- Neabsco Creek
- Maggodee Creek
- Ni River
  - Ni Reservoir
- Occohannock Creek
- Occupacia Creek
- Opequon Creek
- Pamunkey River – named after the Pamunkey people.
  - Pamunkey Creek
- Piankatank River
- Piscataway Creek
- Po River
- Pocaty River
- Pocomoke Sound
  - Pocomoke Sound Wildlife Management Area
- Pohick Creek
- Poni River
- Poropotank River
- Possum Creek
- Powhite Creek
- Pungoteague Creek
- Racoon Creek
- Rowanty Creek
- Sappony Creek
- Ta River
- Tommeheton Creek
- Totuskey Creek
- Upper Chippokes Creek
- Upper Machodoc Creek
- Waqua Creek
- Yeocomico River
  - Northwest Yeocomico River
  - South Yeocomico River
  - West Yeocomico River

=== Other ===
- Allegheny Mountains
- Assateague Island
- Catoctin Valley
  - Catoctin Mountain
- Chippokes State Park
- Kiptopeke State Park
- Machicomoco State Park
- Manassas Gap
- Merrimac Farm Wildlife Management Area
- Mottesheard
- Occoneechee State Park
- Shockoe Valley
- Turkeycock Mountain
  - Turkeycock Wildlife Management Area

== See also ==
- List of place names in the United States of Native American origin
