= Attempts to make the Potomac River navigable =

A series of projects in the 18th and 19th centuries attempted to make the Potomac River navigable and connect the Ohio River valley and the East Coast. The first project was started by the Potomac Company, but it was the Chesapeake and Ohio Canal Company (C&O) that finished the project in the 1830s and 1840s.

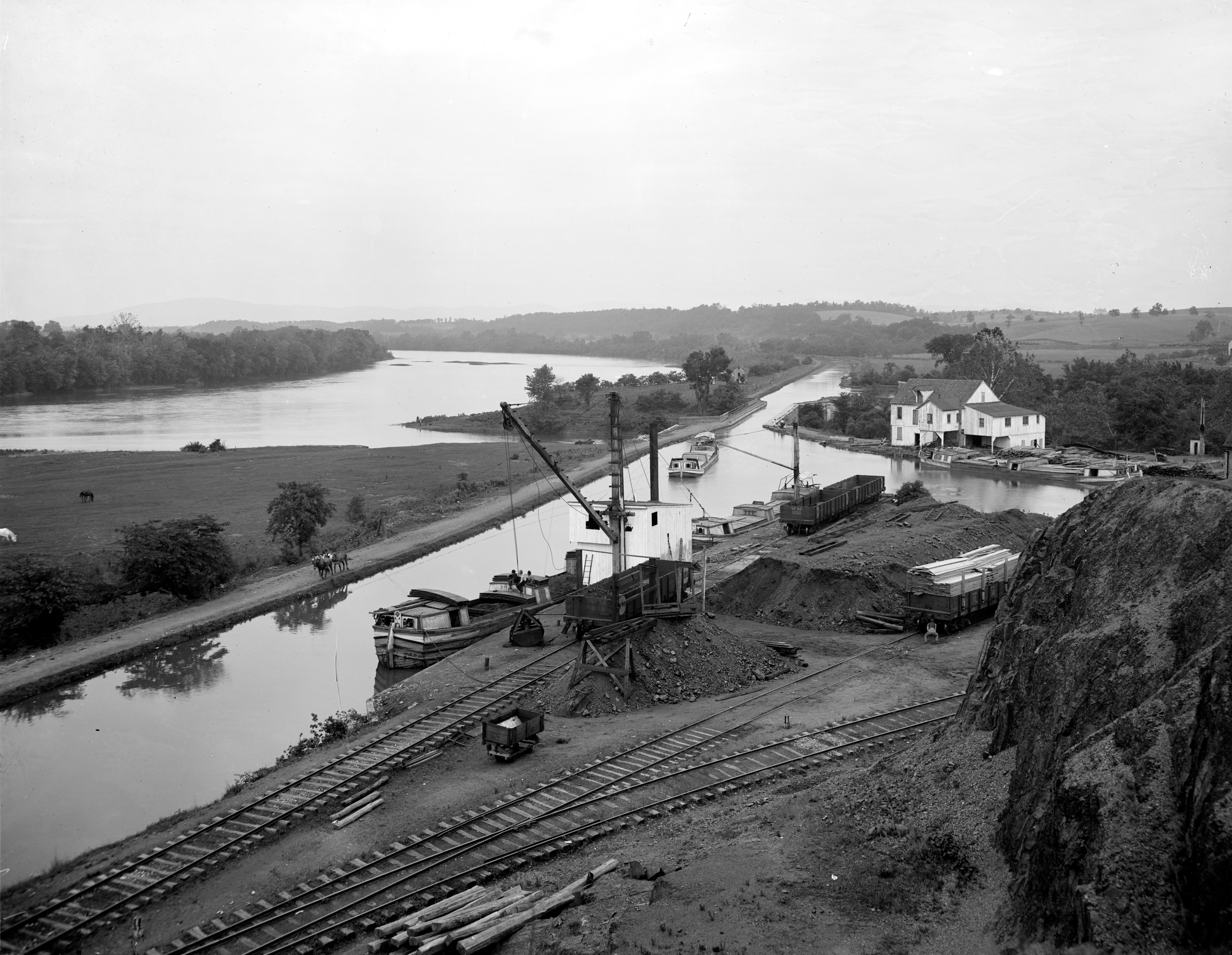
View of loading basin area of the Chesapeake and Ohio Canal at Williamsport, Maryland, USA, with the Potomac River on the left

== History ==
Since 1749 many leaders in Maryland and Virginia had been interested in making the Potomac River into a major transportation route to the trans-Appalachian West. The project to fix the Potomac was seen as a major opportunity strategically (it would transport troops to the frontier with the French or the Indians more rapidly) and economically (it would increase fur trade and improve real estate values). However, a lack of technology, a severe shortage of labor, conflicts with foreign countries, and rivalries internally prevented the project from being started until the 1780s, thirty years later.

=== Project initiation ===
In 1784, a year after the Treaty of Paris was signed, George Washington and Horatio Gates traveled to Annapolis, Maryland to seek the state's assent to the project. Washington urged Virginia Governor Benjamin Harrison to bring the matter to the Virginia Assembly, citing the "commercial and political importance" of the project. Washington's formidable reputation in the U.S. during the time after the Revolution persuaded the governor to present a letter to the Virginia Assembly asking for support for the project. The Virginia Assembly appointed Washington, Gates, and Thomas Blackburn to seek Maryland's agreement. Washington's subsequent visit to Annapolis was successful and led to the incorporation of the Potomac Company in 1784 Maryland and in 1785 in Virginia.

While it was not the first or only project started after the end of the American Revolution, its incorporation was a milestone because it was the first project that connected different regions and required the cooperation of multiple state governments. While the Potomac Company's charter eventually failed—the Maryland and Virginia acts of incorporation were very similar—the company stated it was going to raise 220,000 Spanish dollars (50, 000 pounds sterling) through 500 shares and also stated its plan and timeline. In the charter, the Potomac Company had three years to clear the upper Potomac, and ten years to build a bypass canals and locks around the Little and Great Falls (a distance of 175 miles). Both states passed additional laws to go further—building roads and connecting headwaters in order to link the Potomac River to the Ohio River.

The Potomac Company originally wanted to hire only free labor, but due to the shortage of labor, the directors hired free, indentured, and slave labor to build the locks and canals and deepen the river. James Rumsey, a well known for his work with steam-propelled riverboats, was hired as the project's chief engineer.

=== Legal and financial problems ===
There was a large conflict with Virginia Governor Henry Lee (father of Robert E. Lee), who purchased 500 acres of land around Great Falls (he named it “Matildaville” after his wife) to build a warehouse for goods being transported down the Potomac (predicting the route would quickly become profitable after the project's completion). The legal troubles of the Potomac Company kept its lawyers in and out of court incessantly.

The decline in public confidence in the project led to a more difficult economic position, because the Potomac Company relied on individually buying shares for funds. Maryland and Virginia continued funding the Potomac Company's project beyond the original contract. However even continued investment by Maryland, Virginia, and some individuals could not offset growing expenses due to poor technical advice, labor problems, poor planning and incessant repair work. The work was stop and go because of the continuous need to raise more money. At many points in the project's history (for example in) all work would stop as the company begged for economic assistance, settled lawsuits, and revised its plan.

=== Business starts as problems continue ===
In February 1802, the locks at Great Falls were completed, and the Potomac Company was expected to be immediately profitable. Also in 1802, the Patowmack Canal was completed after 17 years of construction. However, the poor snow in the winter of 1801-1802 and little spring rain in 1802 meant the river was too shallow to navigate that year. The late realization of these unanticipated problems caused the company to give up its earlier goal to link the Potomac and the Ohio Valley, and the new goal was to improve other rivers in the watershed such as the Shenandoah, the Monocacy, and the Antietam.

A commission in 1821 agreed that water transport in the Potomac valley would only be possible with a still-water canal, and the Potomac Company announced it could not fulfill its charter. Virginia created the Potomac Canal Company. Maryland incorporated the Chesapeake and Ohio Canal Company in 1825, and Congress quickly approved its charter.

In 1824, the holdings of the Patowmack Company were ceded to the Chesapeake and Ohio Company. Benjamin Wright, formerly Chief Engineer of the Erie Canal, was named Chief Engineer of this new effort, and construction began with a groundbreaking ceremony on July 4, 1828, by President John Quincy Adams.

The narrow strip of available land along the Potomac River from Point of Rocks, Maryland, to Harpers Ferry caused a legal battle between the C&O Canal and the Baltimore and Ohio Railroad (B&O) in 1828 as both sought to exclude the other from its use. Following a Maryland state court battle involving Daniel Webster and Roger B. Taney, the companies later compromised to allow the sharing of the right of way.

=== The Potomac as a mail route ===
In 1836, the canal was used as a Star Route for the carriage of mails from Georgetown to Shepherdstown, West Virginia, using canal packets. The contract was held by Albert Humrickhouse at $1,000 per annum for a daily service of 72 book miles. The canal approached Hancock, Maryland, by 1839. In 1843, the Potomac Aqueduct Bridge was constructed near the present-day Francis Scott Key Bridge (Washington, D.C.) to connect the Chesapeake and Ohio Canal to the Alexandria Canal which led to Alexandria, Virginia.

The C&O Canal construction work ended at Cumberland, Maryland, in 1850. There was no further construction towards the Ohio River. By this time the canal had already been rendered obsolete. The B&O Railroad had reached Cumberland eight years previously. Debt-ridden, the company dropped its plan to continue construction of the next 180 miles (290 km) of the canal into the Ohio valley.

=== Final canal construction and operation ===
In the 1870s, a canal inclined plane was built two miles (3 km) upriver from Georgetown, so that boats whose destination was downriver from Washington could bypass the congestion in Georgetown. The inclined plane was dismantled after a major flood in 1889 when ownership of the canal transferred to the B&O Railroad, which operated the canal to prevent its right of way (particularly at Point of Rocks) from falling into the hands of the Western Maryland Railway. Operations ceased in 1924 after another flood damaged the canal.

The planned C&O Canal route to navigable waters of the Mississippi watershed would have followed the North Branch Potomac River west from Cumberland to the Savage River. Via the Savage, the canal would have crossed the Eastern Continental Divide at the gap between the Savage and Backbone Mountains near where present day O'Brien Road intersects Maryland Route 495, then via the valley of present-day Deep Creek Lake, followed the Youghiogheny River to navigable waters.
