= Falling Creek =

Falling Creek may refer to:

- Falling Creek (Broad River tributary), a stream in Georgia
- Falling Creek (James River tributary), a stream in Virginia
- Falling Creek, Virginia, an unincorporated community

== See also ==
- Falling Creek Ironworks, Virginia
