= Seneca Creek =

Seneca Creek may refer to:

- Seneca Creek (Potomac River), Maryland
  - Seneca Creek State Park
- Seneca Creek, a watercourse in New Mexico and Oklahoma
- Seneca Creek (North Fork South Branch Potomac River), West Virginia
- Seneca River (Virginia)
