= Seneca River =

Seneca River may refer to:

- Seneca River (New York)
- Seneca River (South Carolina)
- Seneca River (Virginia)
