= Lignite (disambiguation) =

Lignite may refer to:

- Lignite, a type of low quality coal
- Lignite, North Dakota
- Lignite, Virginia
- USS Lignite (IX-162), a Trefoil-class concrete barge
