= Freeman, Virginia =

Unincorporated community in Virginia, United States

Coordinates: 36°45′18″N 77°41′36″W

Freeman is an unincorporated community located in Brunswick County, in the U.S. state of Virginia, formally known as Totaro.

== Oral history of origins ==
The oral history that is shared by members of the Union Bethel RZUA Church tells of two or three enslaved persons, some by the last name of Callis. The brothers, Rufin and Ira, were told by their enslaver in Louisiana that they would be given their freedom and a certain amount of gold if he did not return alive from the Civil War. The enslaver's last name was Callis; Rufin and Ira took it as their own.

When it became known that the enslaver had died, in 1866 the two brothers, now free, walked for about ten days to Totaro, Virginia. With their large sum of money, they were referred to as freemen. Rufin Callis purchased 900 acres of land for $1 per acre. Ira Callis also purchased "several hundred" acres. The area is now known as "Freeman", named in honor of their freedom.

The oral history tells that the land for the Union Bethel RZUA Church, the adjacent school building (now a cemetery), and the cemetery were parts of the purchased land donated to create the church. To this day, members of the Callis and Robertson families own tract of lands in Freeman, Virginia.
