= William Hartshorne =

American merchant and financier

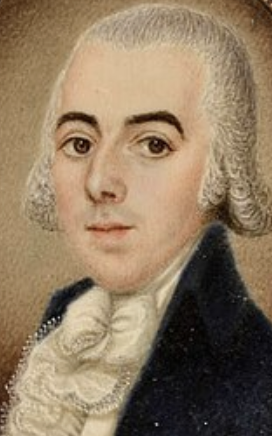
- Born: June 1742; Virginia Colony
- Died: December 14, 1816 (aged 74); Alexandria, Virginia
- Spouse: Susanna Saunders (m. 1767)

William Hartshorne (June 1742 – December 14, 1816) was an American merchant and financier who played a central role in the Potowmack Company as a treasurer as well as commissioner.

== Biography ==
Hartshorne was born in June 1742 in the Virginia Colony. He later moved to Alexandria, ultimately establishing a family of note there; his descendants are said to have had a disproportionate presence in the medical field. On October 8, 1767, he married Susanna Saunders, with whom he had twelve children.

In 1785, upon the inception of Potowmack Company, Hartshorne began working as its commissioner-treasurer. He remained in the position until 1800.

He died in Alexandria on December 14, 1816, at the age of 74.
