= Lorraine, Virginia =

Unincorporated community in Virginia, U.S.

Coordinates: 37°34′02″N 77°37′12″W

Lorraine was an unincorporated community in Henrico County, Virginia.

Lorraine was named for Edward Lorraine, who was the 19th century chief engineer of the James River and Kanawha Canal. According to the Library of Virginia, he was born in 1818. In 1842, he first worked as a rod man doing surveying work on the James River and Kanawha Canal, beginning a career of over 30 years. He was promoted to assistant engineer, and finally appointed chief engineer of the canal succeeding Walter Gwynn. Lorraine served in this position until his death from smallpox in December 1872.

Lorraine became a station stop of the Richmond and Allegheny Railroad which was built on the defunct canal's right-of-way in the 1880s. Soon after completion, the railroad was acquired by the Chesapeake and Ohio Railway. It became a major conduit for transportation of coal from southern West Virginia to the coal pier on the harbor of Hampton Roads at Newport News. The line later became the James River line of CSX Transportation, and continued to support eastbound coal traffic.

Once a moderately busy passenger and freight station on the railroad, Lorraine was discontinued by the C&O in the mid 20th century.

== See also ==
- Former counties, cities, and towns of Virginia
- List of ghost towns in Virginia
