= Howrytown, Virginia =

Former settlement in Virginia, United States

Coordinates: 37.4386°N 79.8871°W

Howrytown was the name of a settlement near Daleville in Botetourt County, Virginia, United States.

== History ==
Howrytown was laid out by Jacob Howry on the Great Wagon Road. He sold 40 lots to 23 people, beginning June 1, 1795.

The settlement is mentioned as a "hamlet" in 1835.

== Geography ==
The site of Howrytown lies at the intersection of VA-670 (Trinity Road) and VA-673 (Greenfield Street), approximately 7 miles south of Fincastle.

== See also ==
- List of ghost towns in Virginia
