= Totaro, Virginia =

Unincorporated community in Virginia, United States

Coordinates: 36°44′51″N 77°41′44″W

Totaro is an unincorporated community located in Brunswick County, in the U.S. state of Virginia.

== Etymology ==
The origin is unknown. In some references Totaro is listed as a placename with Native American origins.

== Name change ==
Formally Totaro is overlapping in coordinates and map references with Freeman. See Freeman, Virginia for references to the name change.
