= Callis =

Callis is a surname. Notable people with the surname include:

- Ann Callis (born 1964), American judge
- Charles A. Callis (1865–1947), American Mormon leader
- Don Callis (born 1963), Canadian wrestler
- Henry Arthur Callis (1887–1974), American physician and fraternity co-founder
- James Callis (born 1971), British actor
- Jim Callis (born 1967), American sportswriter
- Jo Callis (born 1951), British musician and songwriter
- Jo Ann Callis (born 1940), American artist
- John Callis (died 1576), Welsh pirate
- John Benton Callis (1828–1898), American businessman
- Paul Callis (born 1978), British swimmer
- Sam Callis (born 1973), British actor and director
- Tracy Callis, American sportswriter
- William Overton Callis (1756–1814), American politician
