= Matildaville, Virginia =

- Ghost town
- Location within Northern Virginia Location within Virginia Location within the United States
- Coordinates: 38°59′50″N 77°15′46″W
- Country: United States
- State: Virginia
- County: Fairfax
- Time zone: UTC-5 (Eastern (EST))
  - Summer (DST): UTC-4 (EDT)

Matildaville is a ghost town located along the Patowmack Canal near present day Great Falls, Virginia, United States. It was named for the wife of Light Horse Harry Lee, on 40 acres of land owned at the time by Bryan Fairfax, 8th Lord Fairfax of Cameron, and served as headquarters for the Patowmack Company from 1785 until 1799. Now, all that remains of the town are a series of ruins on the grounds of Great Falls Park.

== History ==
Although both the Maryland and Virginia legislatures issued charters for the Patowmack Company in 1785, and George Washington became its first president (as well as owner of 50 shares of stock), the Virginia General Assembly did not issue a charter for this town until 1790. Its first trustees were: George Gilpin, Albert Russell, Josiah Clapham, Richard Bland Lee, Leven Powell and Samuel Love. It began as a staging and headquarters area for construction of the canal. At its height the town included the residence of the Patowmack Canal Company superintendent, a market, grist mill, sawmill, foundry, inn, ice house, workers' barracks, boarding houses, and other homes. Boatman and passengers stopped to wait their turn through the locks.

Although the canal which ultimately opened up the Ohio River Valley for development was a lifelong dream of George Washington, the President died two years before completion of this first section. In 1802, the Patowmack Company finished a series of five canals and locks (including the Patowmack Canal) which enabled flat-bottomed boats poled like gondolas to skirt the falls of the Potomac River, and in 1807 it collected $15,000 in tolls. However, its construction costs greatly exceeded estimates and it never became a financial success. In 1821 a joint committee appointed by the Virginia and Maryland legislatures recommended that its charter be revoked, though instead it merged into the newly organized Chesapeake and Ohio Canal Company in 1828.

An attempt to reinvent the town as a textile manufacturing center, modeled after the town of Lowell, Massachusetts, was made in 1839 by the Great Falls Manufacturing Company. The Company purchased the Patowmack Canal land at Great Falls, along with several town lots. In 1839, the town was re-chartered as South Lowell. However, in 1853, Congress granted the U.S. government power to condemn land in order to construct an aqueduct. In 1858, the government filed a lawsuit to shut the mills, which shareholders and the State of Virginia contested for four decades, by which time the Civil War had ended and the manufacturing enterprise long closed.

Tourists and local fisherman at Great Falls frequently dined and lodged at one of the town's taverns. Dickey's Tavern, constructed c. 1797, claimed to have hosted every U.S. President from George Washington to Theodore Roosevelt and was the last remaining building in Matildaville before a fire destroyed it in 1950.
