= Caledon State Park =

State park in Virginia, US

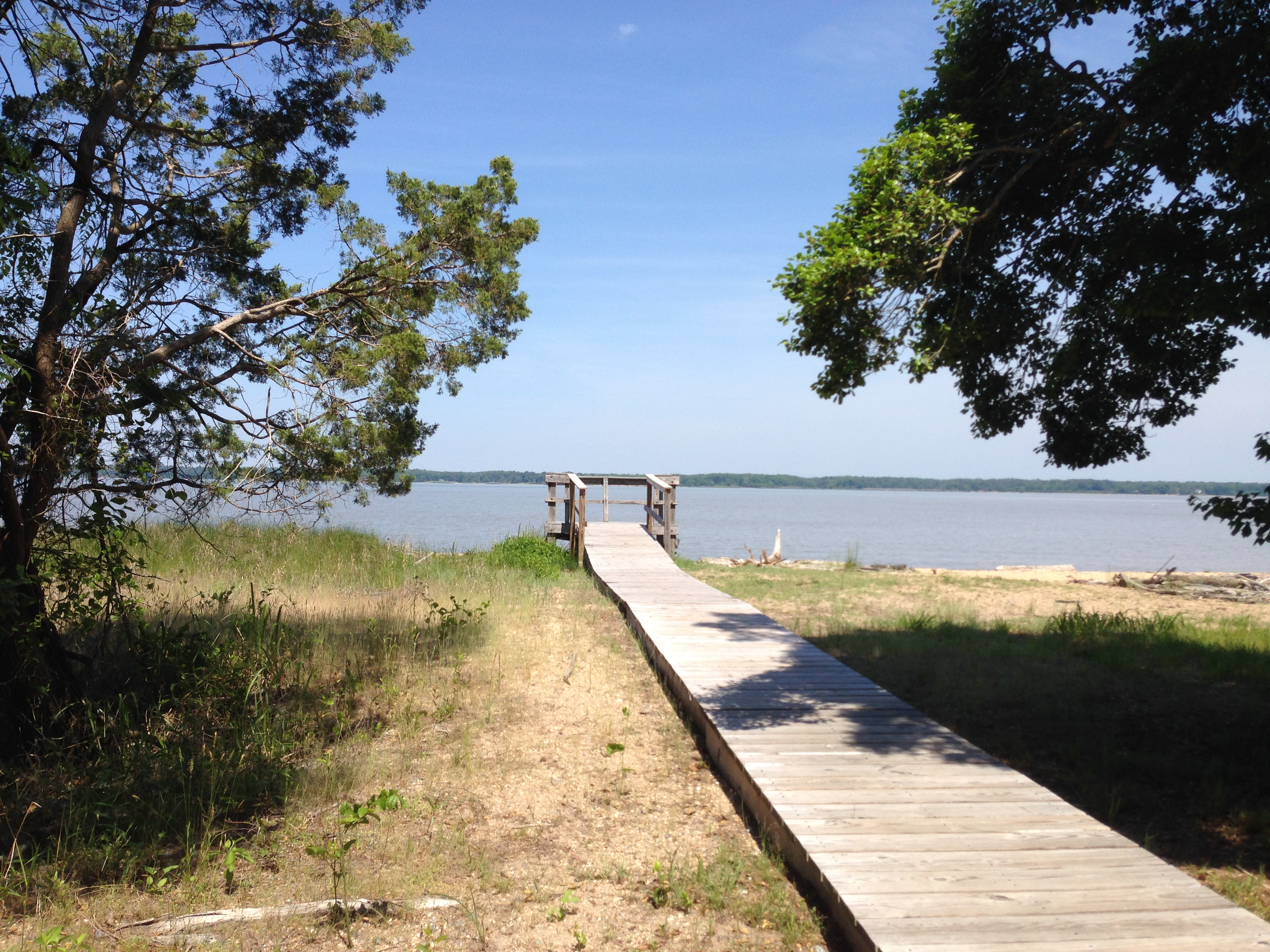
- Boardwalk to the Potomac River at Caledon State Park

- Location within Virginia Location within the United States
- Location: King George County, Virginia
- Coordinates: 38°21′09″N 77°07′58″W
- Area: 2,587 acres (10.47 km^{2})
- Established: 1974
- Visitors: 49,328 (in 2010)
- Governing body: Virginia Department of Conservation and Recreation

U.S. National Natural Landmark
- Designated: 1974

Caledon State Park is a 2,587-acre (10.47 km^{2}) state park located in King George, Virginia. As of 2010, the yearly visitation was 49,328. The property was initially owned by the Alexander brothers, founders of the city of Alexandria, and was established in 1659 as Caledon Plantation. Ownership passed, in 1974, to the Commonwealth of Virginia.

A 302-acre (1.22 km^{2}) portion of the park known as the Caledon Natural Area was designated a National Natural Landmark in 1974 for its old-growth oak-tulip poplar forest. The park also provides a habitat for bald eagles along the Potomac River. Adjacent to the park is the Chotank Creek Natural Area Preserve, a state-designated private conservation area that further protects bald eagle habitat, in addition to wetlands and other significant communities.

== See also ==
- List of Virginia state parks
- List of National Natural Landmarks in Virginia
