= List of ghost towns in Virginia =

This is an incomplete List of ghost towns in Virginia.

== Ghost Towns ==
- Bigler's Mill (York County)
- Ca Ira (Cumberland County)
- Canada (Charlottesville)
- Carvins Cove
- Colchester, Virginia
- Elko Tract
- Falling Creek
- Hanover Town
- Henricus
- Hickory Ridge
- Howrytown
- Jamestown
- Joplin
- Kopp
- Lackey
- Lignite
- Lorraine
- Magruder
- Matildaville
- South Lowell
- Warwick
- Westham
