= Turkeycock Mountain =

Mountain in Virginia, United States of America

Turkeycock Mountain as seen from Quail Road in Callands, Virginia

Turkeycock Mountain is a mountain summit located in Franklin County, Virginia and Henry County, Virginia. Rising out of the eastern foothills of the Blue Ridge Mountains, Turkeycock Mountain rises to 1,657 feet (505 m) above sea level and is located at 36°49′45″N 79°41′13″W. A portion of the mountain is protected as the Turkeycock Wildlife Management Area, which is open to the public.

The Samuel Calland (1750-1808) family home had 22 rooms and was situated at the foot of the Turkeycock Mountain. A one-and-a-half-story six-room building with earthen basement is all that remains of the formerly large structure. Several features of the home, including the main room's high ceiling, pine wainscoting, brick chimney, and one staircase, are still visible.
