= Canada, Virginia =

Community of free African Americans established in Charlottesville in the 19th century

Coordinates: 38°1′53.6″N 78°30′18.6″W

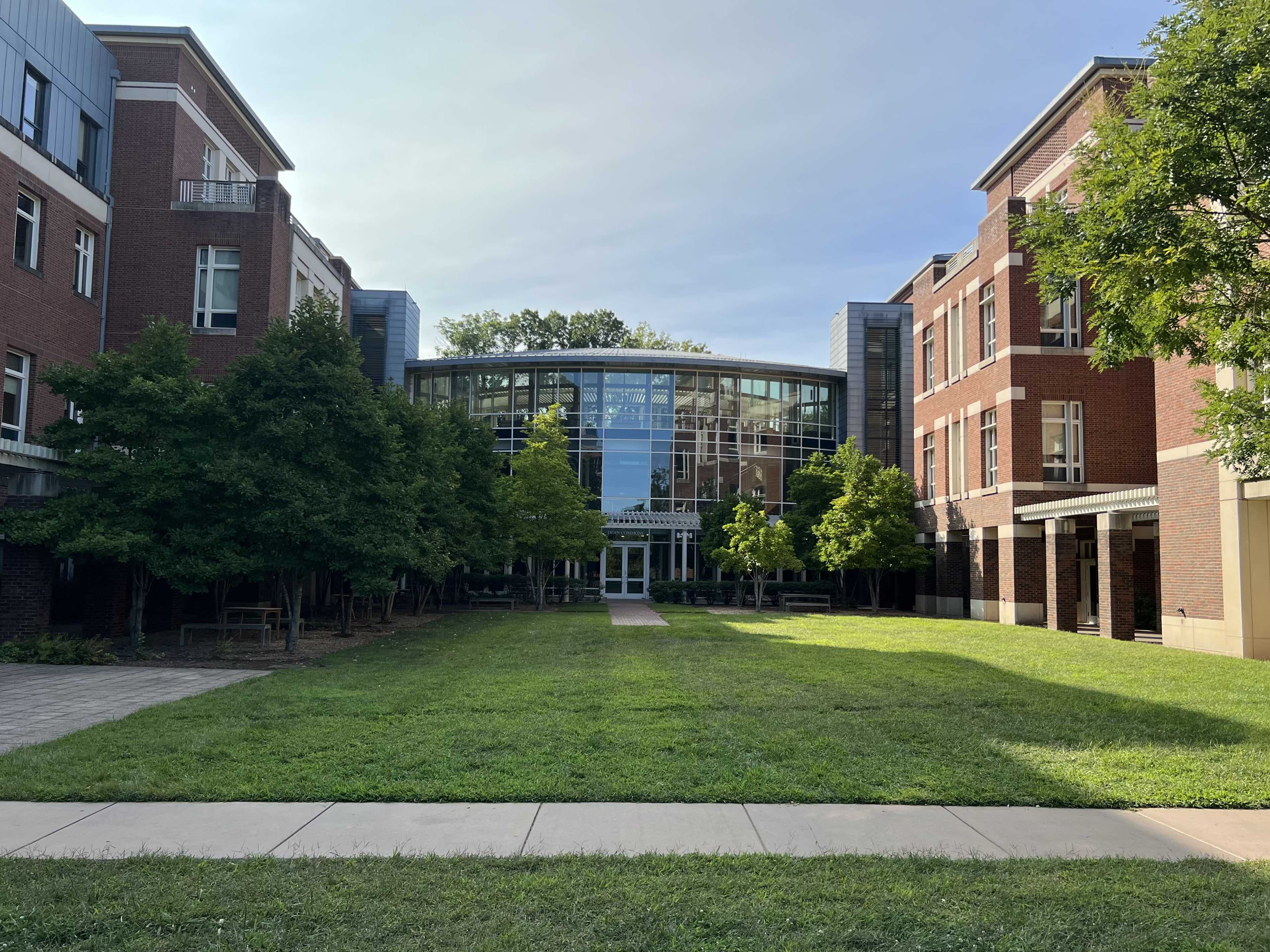
Nau-Gibson Hall at the University of Virginia, approximately where Canada, Virginia was located.

Canada was a small community of free African Americans established near the University of Virginia in Charlottesville in the 19th century. Many residents of Canada were employed by the university. The community existed from the early 19th century until the early 20th century, by which time the increasingly valuable land had been purchased by white speculators. Researchers theorize that the community was named in homage to the country bordering the United States to the north, where slavery had been abolished under the Slavery Abolition Act of 1833.

It was located between what is now Jefferson Park Avenue and Venable Lane, and was rediscovered during the expansion of a university parking lot in May 1993. An architectural firm cataloging the finding believes that the cemetery that they've uncovered served the community; 32 graves have been discovered. The site of the home of one community member is being turned into a 1-acre (4,000 m^{2}) public park.

== See also ==
- List of ghost towns in Virginia
