= Falling Creek, Virginia =

Coordinates: 37°26′13.67″N 77°25′40.84″W

Falling Creek was an unincorporated location in Virginia, United States, along Interstate 95 near the point where a local tributary, Falling Creek, has its confluence with the James River. It was perhaps best known as the site of one of the toll barriers on the Richmond-Petersburg Turnpike, completed in 1958. In modern times, I-95 and the more recently built Pocahontas Parkway toll road now occupy much of the site. Nearby, at the northwestern edge, the old lost town of Port Warwick was located on the river before it was destroyed during the American Revolutionary War.

Nearby, portions of the original Warwick Road extended through what is now South Richmond and Chesterfield County to the Bon Air, Virginia area.

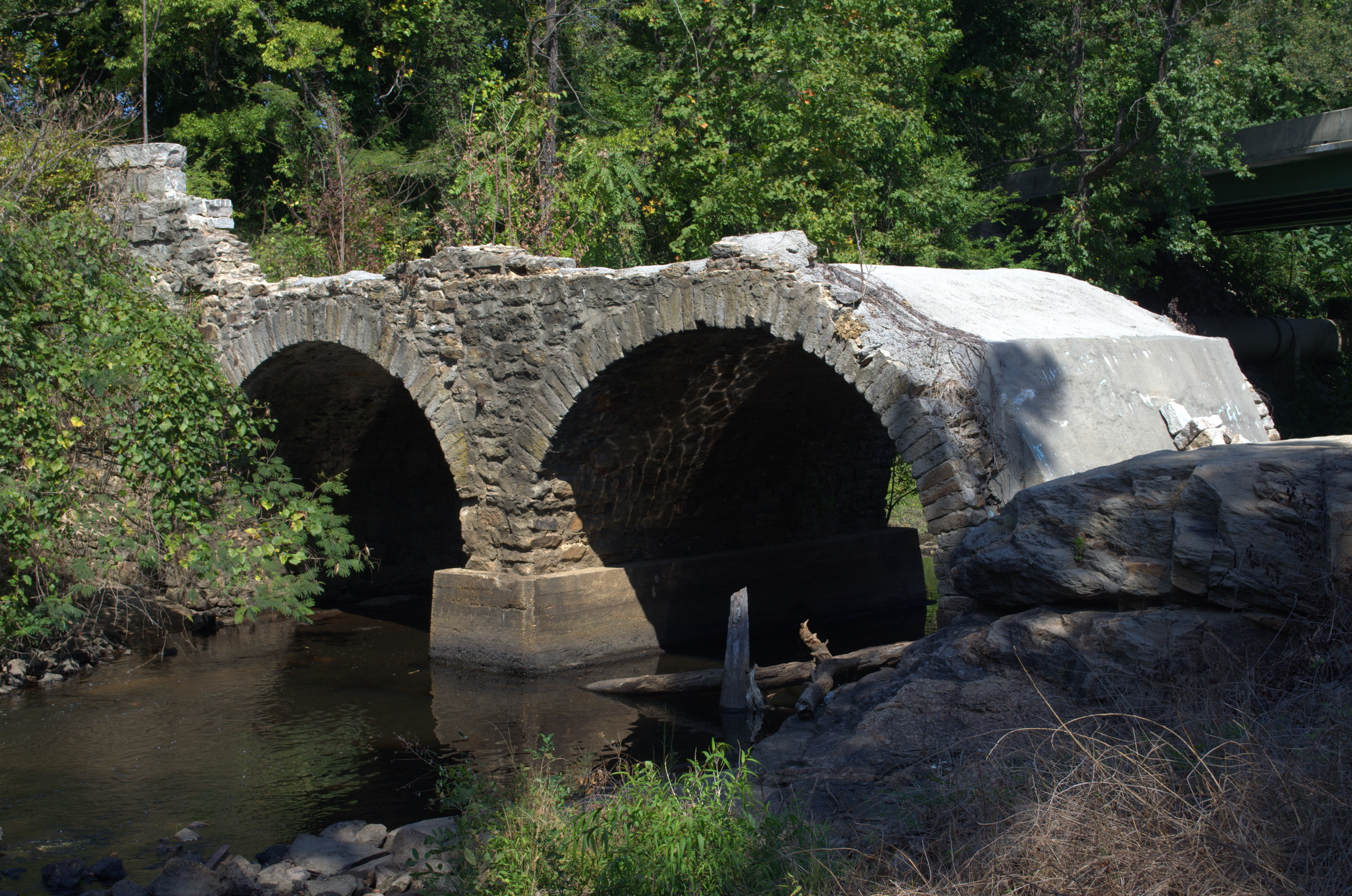
Stone Bridge across Falling Creek

Along U.S. 1, also nearby, a historic stone bridge across Falling Creek was destroyed by flood waters resulting from Tropical Storm Gaston in August, 2004.

== See also ==
- List of ghost towns in Virginia
