= Chotank Creek Natural Area Preserve =

Nature preserve in Virginia, United States

- Location within Virginia
- Location: King George County, Virginia
- Coordinates: 38°21′28″N 77°07′26″W
- Area: 1,108 acres (4.48 km^{2})
- Established: 2001
- Owner: Private

Chotank Creek Natural Area Preserve is a 1,108-acre (4.48 km^{2}) Natural Area Preserve located in King George County, Virginia. The preserve is situated east of Caledon State Park, and borders the Potomac River to which the preserve's namesake, Chotank Creek, is a tributary. It is part of the larger Cedar Grove farm, which is protected by a conservation easement. The preserve was dedicated in 2001 through an agreement with the property's private landowner.

Chotank Creek Natural Area Preserve protects a variety of habitats and natural communities, including upland hardwood forests, marshlands, swamp forests, and brackish scrub. Large gatherings of bald eagles have been observed to congregate on the Potomac near the preserve, and several nests have been found on the property.

The preserve is privately owned, and public access is not permitted. The site is managed with guidance from the Virginia Department of Conservation and Recreation.

== See also ==
- List of Virginia Natural Area Preserves
