= Paul Callis =

British swimmer

Personal information
- Born: October 2, 1978 (age 47) Kingston upon Hull, Great Britain

Sport
- Sport: Swimming

Paul Callis (born 2 October 1978) is a retired British swimmer. Paul attended Hymers College whilst training at various Hull swimming clubs during his sporting career including Hull Olympic, City of Hull, Kingston Upon Hull swimming club (KUHSC) and in his later years of competing at South Hunsley.

Born in Kingston upon Hull, Humberside, England, Paul's specialty was individual medley and breaststroke, and took bronze in the 100 and 200 metre finals representing England at the 2001 World Cup in Sheffield.

Paul was an unbeaten champion within Hull and Humberside for many years at various disciplines including: 50m/100m/200m breaststroke, 100m/200m individual medley, 50m/100m butterfly and 50m/100m/200m freestyle. Paul has won regional gold medals on numerous occasions at the Yorkshire championships and North Eastern England championships. Paul has also been a British champion on numerous occasions across a multitude of events.

Paul was one of a handful of swimmers selected to test the 'shark suit' before it was released at the USA Olympic centre in Colorado Springs before the launch at the Sydney Olympics in 2000. Furthermore, Paul tested the suits in Dunedin New Zealand, as a 'guinea pig' for Michael Phelps prior to the Athens Olympics in 2004.

Paul gained a world ranking positioning of 17th, and 2nd in the UK. Paul was also one of a select few to break the 50 second barrier for the 100 metre freestyle.
