= Falling Creek (Broad River tributary) =

Stream in Georgia, U.S.

Coordinates: 33°58′42″N 82°47′54″W

Falling Creek is a stream in the U.S. state of Georgia. It is a tributary to the Broad River.

The creek was named after John Falling, a relative of Cherokee leader James Vann.
