= Alexandria Canal (Virginia) =

Abandoned canal in Alexandria, Virginia, United States

- Alexandria Canal Tide Lock
- U.S. National Register of Historic Places
- Virginia Landmarks Register
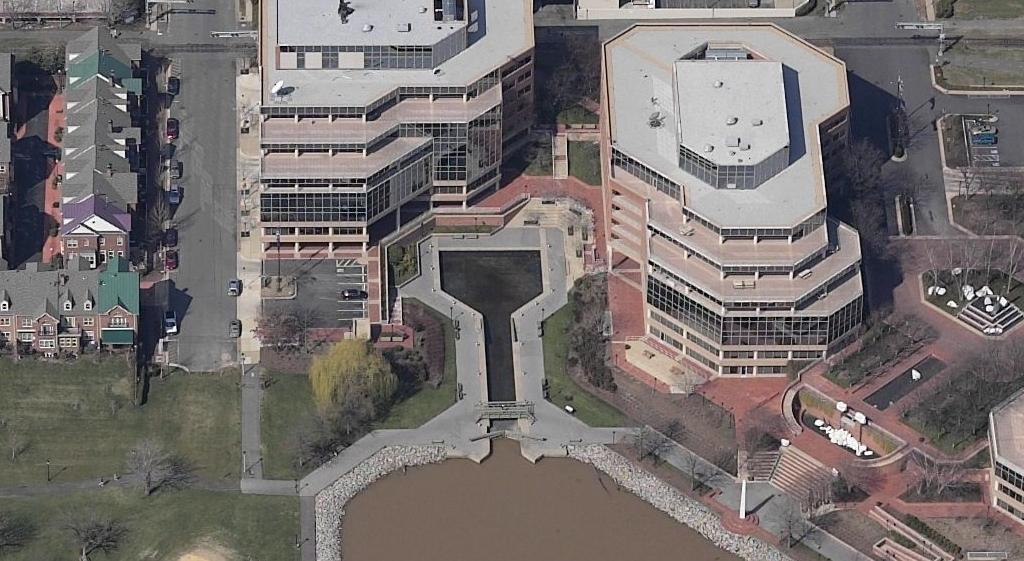
- Alexandria Canal Center with reconstructed Tidal Basin and Tidal Lock

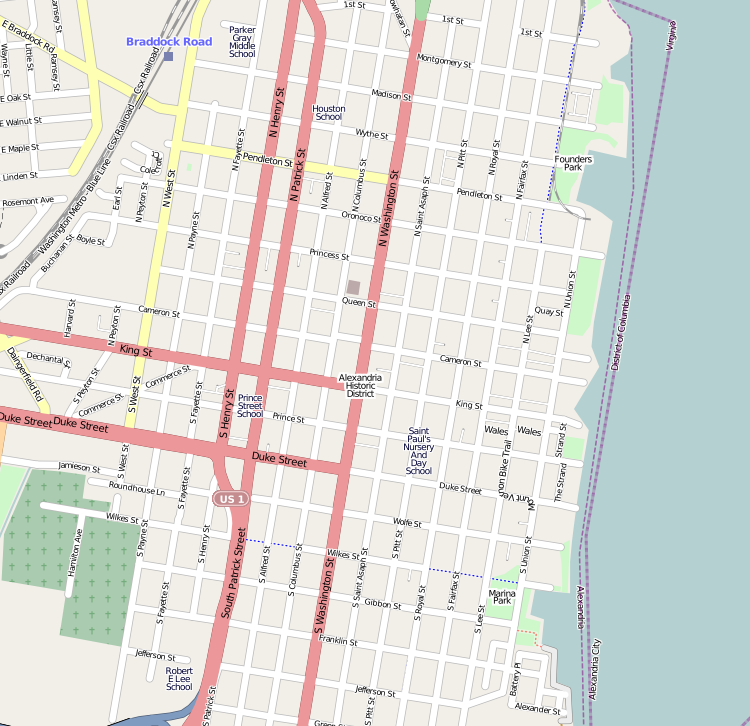
- Location within Alexandria Historical District Location within Virginia Location within the United States
- Nearest city: Alexandria, Virginia
- Coordinates: 38°48′49.6″N 77°2′18.2″W
- Area: 5.7 acres (2.3 ha)
- Built: 1833
- Architect: Alexandria Canal Co.
- NRHP reference No.: 80004305
- VLR No.: 100-0099

Significant dates
- Added to NRHP: January 15, 1980
- Designated VLR: November 20, 1979

The Alexandria Canal was a canal in the United States that connected the Chesapeake and Ohio Canal at Georgetown in the District of Columbia to the Potomac River at the city of Alexandria both when it was a part of the District of Columbia and when it was part of Virginia.

It was often treated as an extension of the Chesapeake and Ohio Canal and called by that name. It was also sometimes called the Washington and Alexandria Canal.

== History ==
=== Planning ===
The idea of connecting Alexandria, VA to the Ohio River predated the American Revolution. The first real effort to do that started in 1785 when George Washington formed the Potomac Company to improve the movement of boats on the Potomac River. This company created some small canals to improve the navigability of the Potomac River, but it was not an easy journey.

Talk of a canal between Alexandria and Georgetown started in 1805 after the construction of the causeway to Mason's Island obstructed the safest passage for boats, making water trips between the two cities hazardous when the weather was anything other than favorable; and thus harming business interests in Alexandria. In 1812, Congress passed a law authorizing construction of a canal between the two if work began within two years; but plans were scuttled by the War of 1812.

In 1825, the Chesapeake and Ohio Canal Company (C&O Canal) was established to connect Washington, DC to the Ohio River. Its first section opened in 1830.

=== Construction and opening ===
In 1830 merchants from Alexandria (which at the time was within the jurisdiction of the federal District of Columbia) proposed linking their city to Georgetown to capitalize on the new canal. Unlike Georgetown, Alexandria had a deep water port and merchants there saw an opportunity. Congress granted a charter to the Alexandria Canal Company on May 26, 1830, to build a canal as a spur to the C&O Canal. A groundbreaking featuring George Washington Parke Custis was held in Alexandria on July 3, 1831, and construction began the next day. The C&O Canal built the Georgetown abutment and the Alexandria Canal Company built the rest. Work relied heavily upon the forced labor of enslaved people. In 1835, the canal built a causeway across Four Mile Run and a viaduct to carry the turnpike over the stream and under the canal. Despite delays caused by the Panic of 1837, the aqueduct opened on July 4, 1843, and the canal opened, as far as the turning basin at Washington and Montgomery Streets on December 2, 1843. The locks down to the river weren't completed until 1845.

The Aqueduct Bridge (begun in 1833 and completed in 1843) enabled canal boats from the C&O Canal to cross the Potomac River without descending to the river level. The boats would then continue their trips downstream on a canal on the southwest side of the Potomac until they reached Alexandria's seaport.

=== Early Years ===
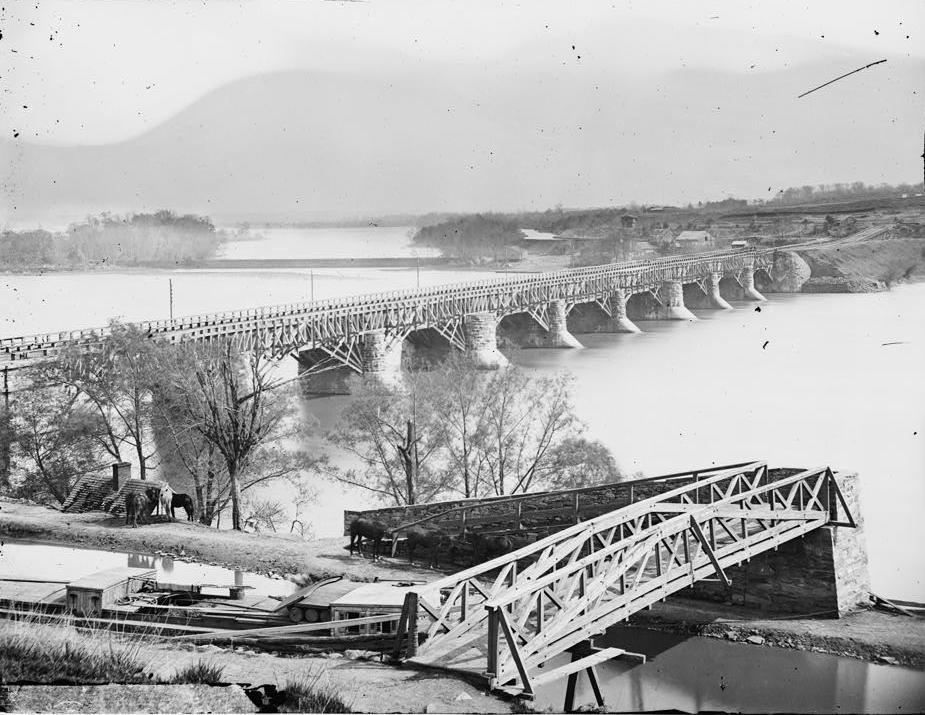
First Aqueduct Bridge in 1860

The canal proved to be more expensive, and less profitable, than expected. In early 1846, three years after the Canal opened, Alexandria Common Council member Lewis McKenzie, motivated by the large corporation taxes that had to be paid to fund the canal, restarted the Alexandria retrocession movement that had been on and off again since the District was formed. He introduced a motion that the mayor resend the results of the 1840 pro-retrocession vote to Congress and the Virginia legislature and promised that Congress would assume the Canal debt. On February 2, 1846, the Virginia General Assembly voted to accept the retrocession of Alexandria County if Congress approved. The debate over retrocession then moved to the U.S. Congress, where the Town Committee met with the District Committee of the House to ask for both retrocession and relief from their Canal debt, with the Committee expressing support of relief if retrocession were carried out. Town leaders then expected a bill that would provide for both, causing many to believe that the issues were tied together and that to vote for retrocession would be to vote for Congress to take on Alexandria's debt. Later the House decided to decouple the issues and to abandon relief altogether. Despite this, retrocession passed later in 1846, in large part because Virginia promised to take on Alexandria's canal debt, which it did in 1848.

In 1850, the C&O Canal was completed to Cumberland, extending the reach of the Alexandria Canal and the first ship made it from the mines to Alexandria on October 17, 1850. From then on coal became the major commodity and source of revenue for the canal, but it was also used to ship wheat, corn, whiskey, corn meal, flour, fish, salt, plaster, and lumber. The canal also made money supplying water to mills and businesses along the canal and in the winter it sold ice to local butchers. Despite this, traffic on the canal continued to decline in the face of competition from railroads, which had many advantages including the ability to run all winter. In addition, the canal needed constant repair due to freshets and silt build up.

In the late 1850s the Alexandria, Loudoun and Hampshire railroad built a trestle over the canal at what was then Water Street (then Lee Street, and now the Washington and Old Dominion Trail) and another near the current day intersection of Potomac Greens Drive and Norfolk Lane; and in the same time period the Alexandria and Washington Railroad built their railroad through an existing arch under the canal near Four Mile Run. The railroad, which was double-tracked elsewhere, had to be single-tracked under the canal, which resulted in a fatal crash in 1885. In 1858-59 several new bridges were built over the canal. One was at Poor House Lane (now Monroe Avenue) and replaced one that had collapsed earlier, another at Hunter's, and a third at the locks in Alexandria.

=== Civil War Closure ===
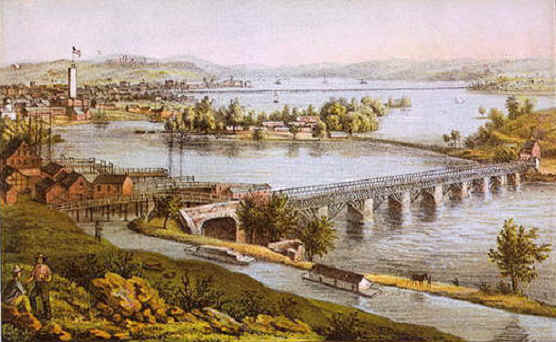
1865 Painting of the Aqueduct Bridge and canals

In 1861, the Alexandria Canal was shut down due to the Civil War and on May 23 U.S. troops used it to cross the river and take control of Alexandria. The bridge was drained and turned into a road to enable troop movement and the canal was used as an earthwork. General George McClellan had the canal itself drained and turned into a military road and Fort Haggerty was built on one side of it. The use as a road caused substantial damage to the banks of the canal and it took years after the war to repair it.

=== Alexandria Canal and Bridge Company ===
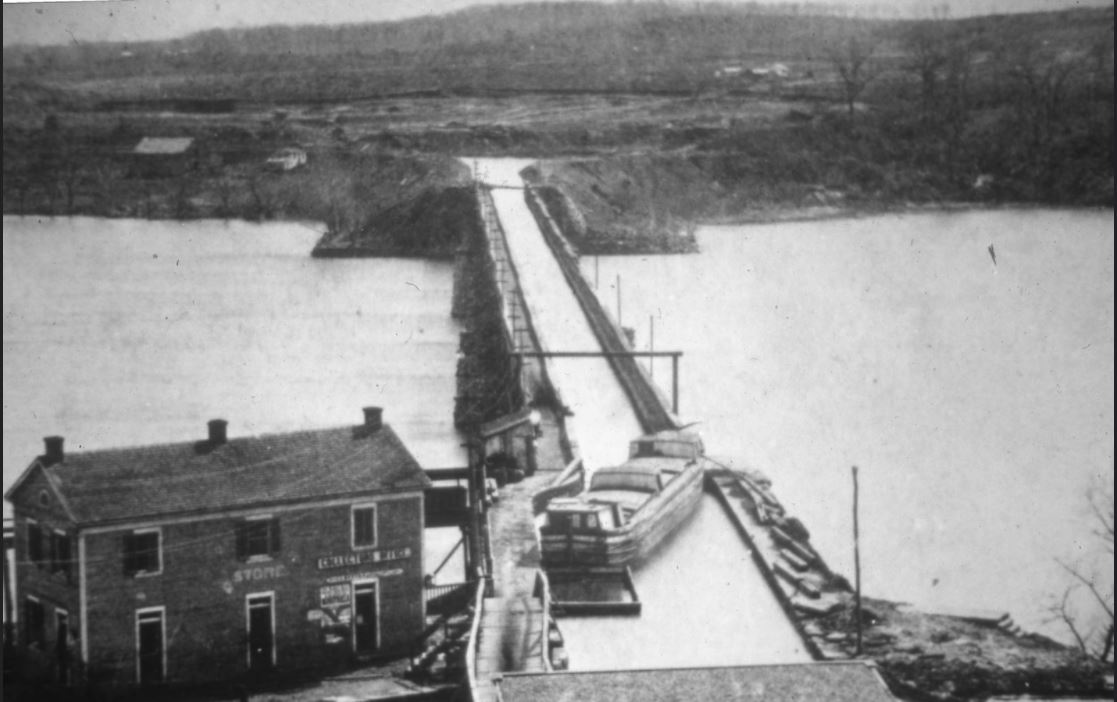
1885 View of the Potomac Aqueduct Bridge from Georgetown into Rosslyn, Virginia

In 1866 the state ordered Alexandria to dispose of its canal stock and they did so while arranging for the Alexandria Canal Company to lease for 99 years the bridge to local businessmen - including General H.H. Wells - who formed the Alexandria Canal and Bridge Company (sometimes the Alexandria Canal, Railroad and Bridge Company). A few months later, in September, the military turned the aqueduct over to the lessees who began repairs on the canal while also obtaining permission to build a railroad, the Alexandria and Georgetown Railroad, alongside it. The canal reopened on April 2, 1867, but due to the continued need for repairs, was closed again in June. Over the ensuing months, a new aqueduct was constructed on the old piers. The new canal bridge opened on May 30, 1868, and soon after it did they began to design and have authorized the construction of a bridge over the canal, on the same piers, that could hold a wagonway and a railroad line. They received permission for the addition in late September and started work by mid-November 1868. In December 1868, they were granted permission to lay out a small village on the Virginia side of the bridge that they wanted to call Rosslyn after the Ross farm located there. The toll bridge over the canal opened on January 12, 1869.

Later in 1868, the canal lessees turned their focus to the railroad they wished to build from Georgetown to Four Mile Run. In late 1869 they hired an engineer, bought ties and iron rails and made arrangements to connect to the existing Loudoun and Hampshire Railroad at Four Mile Run. They held a formal groundbreaking at the Virginia side of the Aqueduct Bridge on October 28, 1869, but no work was done. In 1870-1871 they contracted with the National Junction Railroad, a railroad chartered in 1870, to build a railroad from the south end of the bridge to Alexandria and from the north end to the B&O's depot in Washington. Again, work was never started and instead the two parties wound up in a lengthy lawsuit.

The people of Georgetown had wanted a toll-free bridge across the Potomac for years and had grown accustomed to being able to use the Aqueduct Bridge for free during the Civil War. Furthermore, boating interests wanted the bridge removed or replaced with a draw-bridge so that taller ships could travel farther up-river and they wanted the leakage repaired to keep boats from being drenched when they passed underneath. In 1881 Congress authorized the government to purchase the Aqueduct Bridge to create a toll-free bridge across the river and in 1882 they appropriated money to that end. At first the canal company refused to sell, then agreed to sell only on the condition that the aqueduct portion remain; but in 1884 it relented and agreed to receive $85,000 for the piers and $50,000 for the deck.

For the next two years the Canal, the C&O Canal, the city of Alexandria and the U.S. government fought over who owned the Georgetown abutment, debts owed, and the location of $300,000 of canal stock that the U.S. Government purchased in 1866–67, but that they claimed Alexandria never transferred to them.

=== Purchase of the Aqueduct Bridge and Final Closure ===
Things came to a head in 1886. In July Congress passed an act obligating the Secretary of War to purchase the Aqueduct Bridge for $125,000 and to repair and reconstruct it; or if not able to buy it, to build a new bridge at Three Sisters. A few days earlier the lessees had requested that the owners agree to sell. On September 20, 1886, a section of the aqueduct trunk fell, releasing the water into the river. An analysis of the bridge's safety led the District government to close it on October 6, 1886, and with it the Alexandria Canal. Two weeks later the lessees and owners agreed to terms for the sale of the bridge. At a stockholder's meeting on November 22, it was agreed that the Canal company would transfer the Bridge to the Canal and Bridge company who would then sell it to the U.S. Government for $125,000. It would use the revenue to pay all outstanding judgments against the Canal and the Canal Company would retain the nine miles of canal land in Virginia. The deal was then finalized on December 21, 1886 - only one day before the deadline set by the 1886 law.

=== Disposition ===
A series of lawsuits followed the closing. The Canal and Bridge Company sued the District for closing the canal while allowing people to use the wagonway for free. The District sued them back for not maintaining the bridge for 20 years and for not paying taxes. Another lawsuit against the Canal Company resulted in the officers being ousted in May 1887 and the company's assets being turned over to a receiver. At the time, the stock was owned almost entirely by the United States, Virginia and the Wheeler family (which had inherited the Charles Bennett fortune in 1850). In July 1887, Virginia gave some of its stock to the United States to clear Alexandria's debt and sold the rest, making the US government the controlling interest in the company.

The end of the canal also spelled the end of several businesses. The Arlington Brick Machine Company near the outlet of the canal closed, as it relied on the canal for its business and it shut down that same year - though it was replaced by the Excelsior Brick Company. The coal companies cancelled their leases to the wharfs at the canal outlet as well.

Despite the lawsuits and delays, the Bridge and Canal Company began removing the wooden trunk of the Aqueduct in February 1887.

In 1888, the courts decided that Alexandria's claims for loans were valid, that all of the property of the Canal - including the stones and land - would be used to pay those debts and later forced the sale of the canal's property to pay debts. The property was divided into six sections and sold at auction on June 7, 1888, as were all of the cut stones at the locks. The timber from the bridge was sold as well and the boards were cut and reused in Georgetown. Before Alexandria could collect, the federal government sued claiming they were owed some of that money as well. The city of Alexandria paid nearly $500,000 into the canal over the years, but after the sale of the property for $40,000 and the payment of legal fees, they wound up evenly dividing the remaining $24,000 with the U.S. government in October 1889.

The Alexandria and Washington Railroad purchased the section from Four Mile Run to the Alexandria boundary and in late July/early August 1888 they removed the canal embankment near its rail line and blew up part of the heavy stone two-arch viaduct over it with dynamite so that it could double track the railroad there. The rest of the viaduct remained at least until 1891, but was eventually removed. A few weeks after the auction the railroad purchased the canal property section from Four Mile Run north along the tracks.

By August 1890, the canal south of Four Mile Run had been significantly filled in and the banks had been plowed down and seeded.

The City of Alexandria purchased the portion of the locks and the land around it. Alexandria residents began repurposing the bricks and stones in the late 1890s. Bricks were removed to build the floor of the old gas house. In late 1900 they partially dismantled the locks, broke up the rough stone of the lock pools for street pavement and repurposed the smooth stones for curbs. The cornerstone of the Canal, bearing the date "1844", was moved from near the railroad bridge over the canal (along the current day Mt. Vernon Trail between Canal Center Plaza and Montgomery) to the corner of Cameron and Union and used as a curb.

In 1904, the Washington and Ohio railroad bridge over the canal near Del Ray was torn down as part of construction of the Potomac Yard.

== Route ==
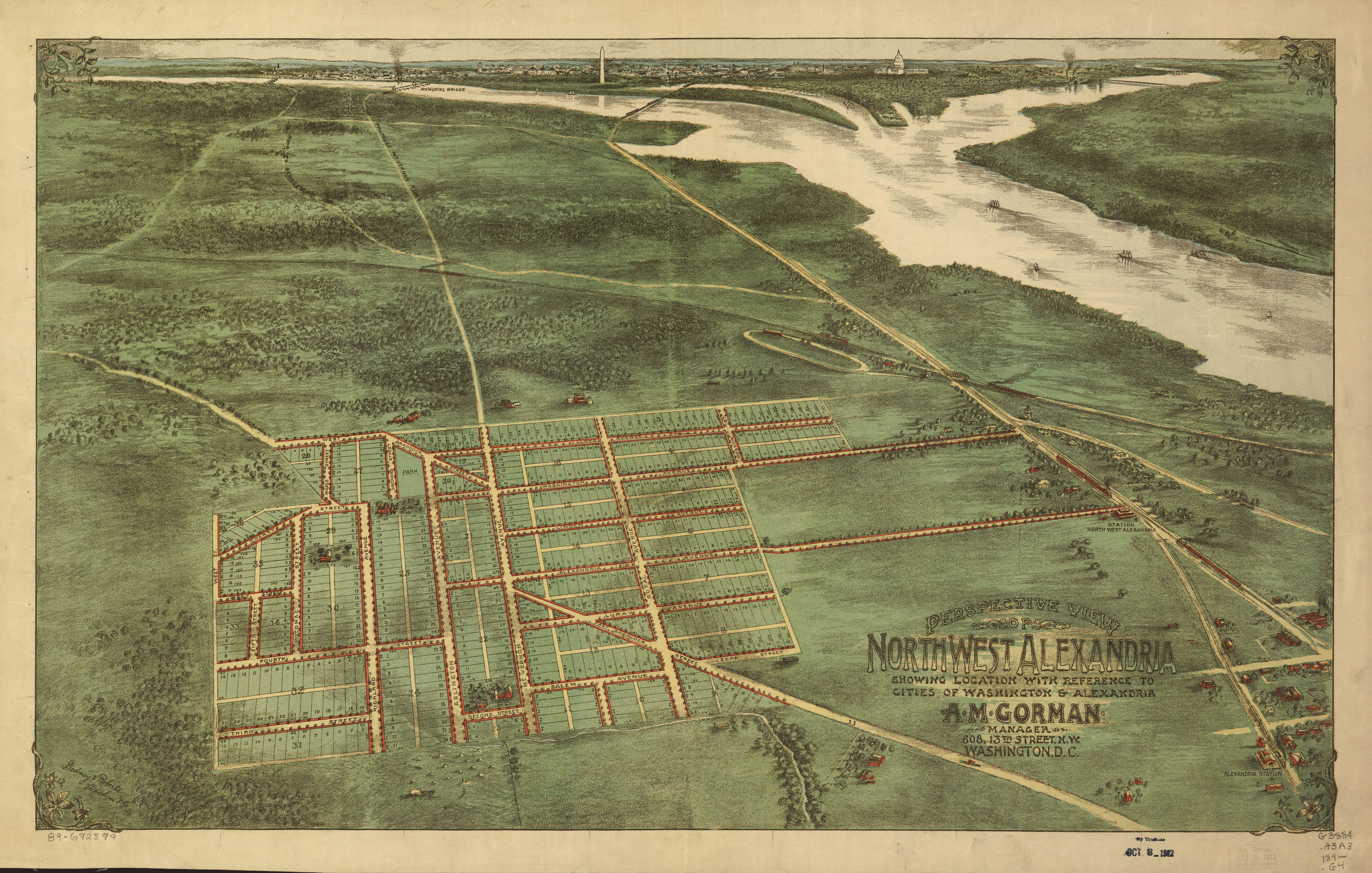
Panoramic map of Alexandria county from 1890 in which the canal can be seen as a dark line.

The canal ran southwards for 7.12 miles from the Aqueduct Bridge through today's Arlington County and City of Alexandria, Virginia. It had arched masonry bridges (torn down during expansion north of the George Washington Parkway) over the road to Mason's Island and Rocky Run. Farther south it crossed over Four Mile Run and, later, the Alexandria and Washington Railroad on a brick and stone aqueduct. It passed under the Washington and Old Dominion Railroad and then into Alexadria. In Alexandria, it dropped 38 feet through a series of four locks between Washington Street and the Potomac River. The Canal ended at a Tidal Basin (Pool No. 1), after crossing under the W&OD railroad again, and a Tidal Lock (Lift Lock No. 1) located at the north end of Old Town Alexandria.

== Remnants ==
The most prominent remnant of the canal is the continued presence of Arlington County and Alexandria in northern Virginia following retrocession. But the impact of the canal lives on in other ways as well. Historic markers are located in Alexandria at 901 N. Fairfax Street, 2501 Potomac Avenue and 525 Montgomery Street.

=== Bridge remnants ===
==== The Aqueduct Bridge ====
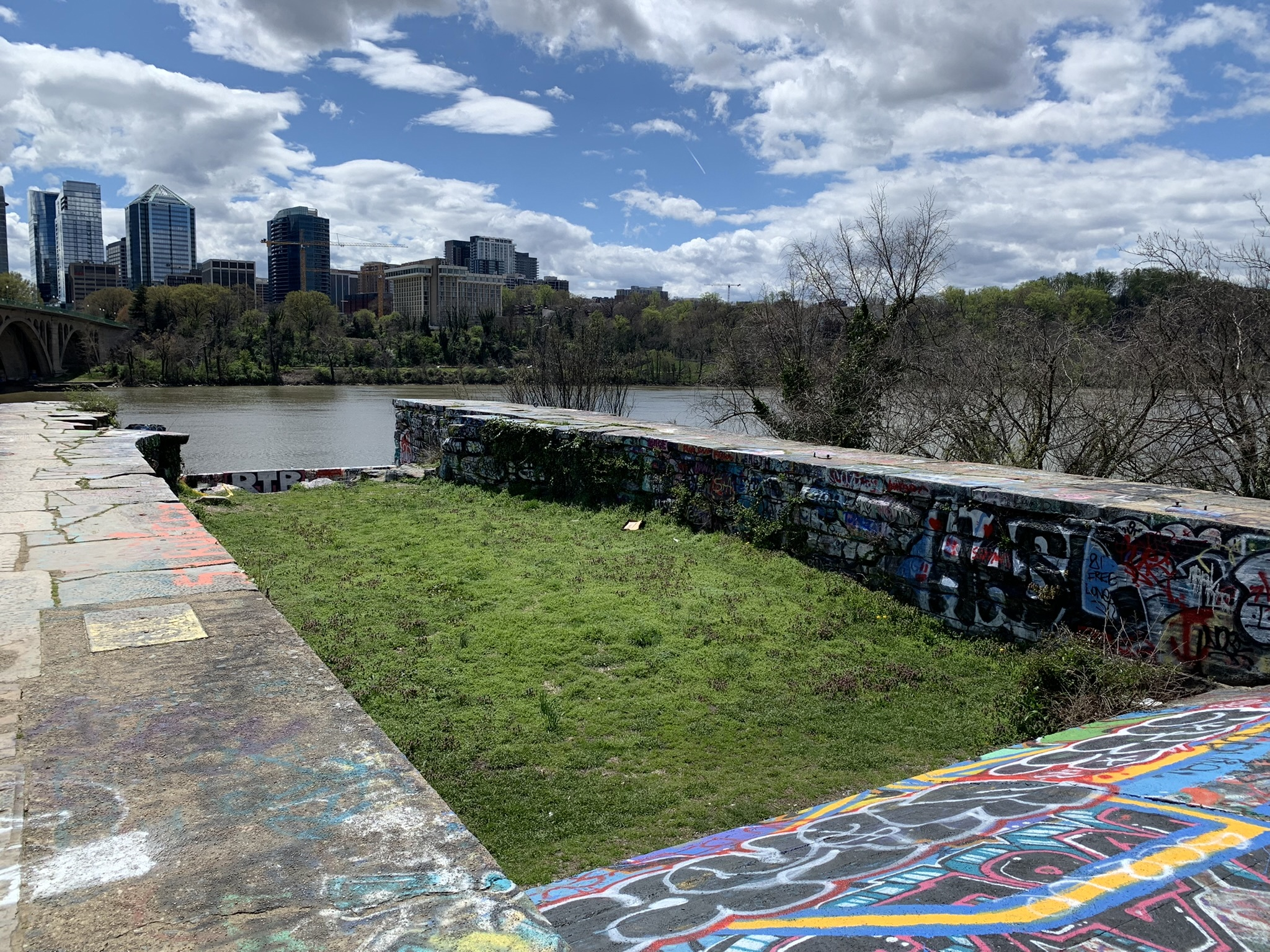
View of Rosslyn from the top of the Aqueduct Bridge Abutment in Georgetown

The bridge pier and abutments were used to create a new free bridge, with a 24 foot wide roadway and two 6 feet wide sidewalks, that opened on April 11, 1888.

After the Key Bridge was completed in 1923 the bridge was closed. The old superstructure of the Aqueduct Bridge was removed in 1933, but the Georgetown abutment, part of the Alexandria abutment and the piers remained. In 1962, seven of the eight stone piers were demolished by the Army engineers as a training exercise and to make more room in the river for racing regattas. The rubble was moved to Anacostia Park, and used as seawalls. One pier was preserved for historical purposes at the insistence of Eleanor Lee Templeman of the Arlington Historical Society.

==== Rosslyn Culverts ====
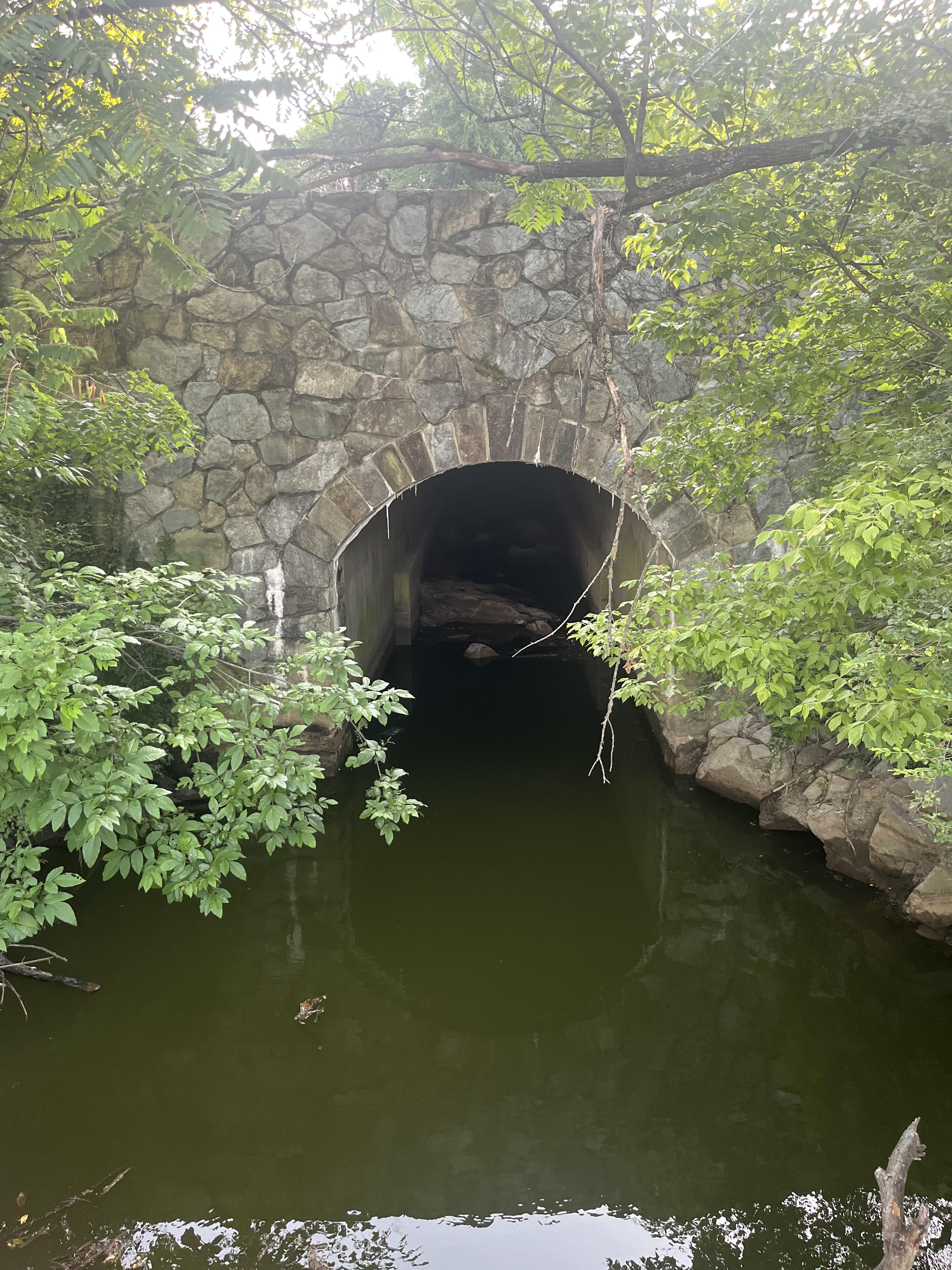
Alexandria Canal Culvert carrying Rocky Run under the George Washington Parkway

Two culverts from the old canal still exist. A small one allowed Rocky Run to pass beneath the Canal and is now used by the George Washington Parkway to cross the stream (it can be seen from the Mt. Vernon Trail bridge over Rocky Run). The other, larger one - through which the road to Analostan Island passed - also remains but is buried. During prohibition it was used by bootleggers and then later for storage.

=== Railroads and roads ===
In April 1888, just days after the Free Bridge opened, the Canal was filled where the Columbia Pike crossed it to create a better road.

==== Rosslyn Connecting Railroad ====
In 1892, the Pennsylvania Railroad purchased the canal land from the north side of Arlington estate to Rosslyn and began construction of a line that traveled between the southern end of the Long Bridge and the southern end of the Aqueduct Bridge. In 1893 they were granted permission to build the rail line on the canal right-of-way through the Arlington reservation (currently Arlington Cemetery). It opened in 1896. The line, which passed the present site of The Pentagon, traveled within the grade of the former canal in the area that lies between Arlington National Cemetery and the Potomac River. In 1904, the line became the Rosslyn Connecting Railroad, which the Pennsylvania Railroad owned through a subsidiary, the Philadelphia, Baltimore and Washington Railroad (PB&W).

Development of Arlington's waterfront led to several changes to, and the ultimate demise of, the railroad. In 1931 the railroad was moved into an underpass below Memorial Avenue to allow for the construction of the Arlington Memorial Bridge. When the Pentagon was erected in 1941, the railroad gave more than 12 acres of land and its tracks - including the footprint of the canal - to the War Department for construction of the building. They were given 4.5 acres of land to the east of the Pentagon to use instead. In 1962 the northern 2.3 miles of the line, the part that was still on the Canal footprint, was purchased by the Virginia Highway Department to construct the approaches to the Theodore Roosevelt Bridge and a few months later the line was abandoned. In 1969, the Arlington Connecting Railroad was merged into the Penndel Company. The last 0.39 miles, which only served the Pentagon's Heating and Refrigeration Plant, was closed sometime later.

The railroad land purchased by the Highway Department and not used by them was given to the Park Service in late 1962. The Park Service allowed the Washington Metropolitan Area Transit Authority to construct an open section of Metrorail's Blue Line along a portion of the railroad's (and former canal's) route from Arlington Boulevard south to Washington Boulevard. The section of the Blue Line opened on July 1, 1977.

The route of the canal/connecting railroad from the old Aqueduct Bridge to Arlington Boulevard is now mostly empty land along the west side of the George Washington Memorial Parkway or under the footprint of the I-66-Route 110 interchange. A small portion of the Mt. Vernon Trail between Lynn and the Parkway sits on about 500 feet of the remaining route. From Washington Boulevard to Arlington Junction Park, the route has been supplanted by the Pentagon, its parking lots and the roads around it.

==== Mount Vernon Line ====
In 1896, ten years after the canal closed, the Mount Vernon line of the Washington, Alexandria, and Mount Vernon Electric Railway was constructed on the canal's bed and west-side towpath from Four Mile Run to just past Arlington Junction. Arlington's South Eads Street now approximates the canal's route in this area.

Between Four Mile Run and Canal Center there are no visible remnants of the canal, but the Mason Hall Apartments in Alexandria were built on the Canal's right of way and thus has a curve that matches the canal's curve there.

=== Locks ===
The canal's locks and basin remain, at least in part, but are all buried underground.

Parts of the canal in Alexandria were still visible, with a bridge over part and ice skating in some of the basins, as late as 1937.

In the 1970s the American Canal Society began taking an interest in preserving the locks. In 1979 Alexandria City archaeologists identified the exact location of lock #1 and in March 1982 began excavating it. The developers of the neighboring Trans-Potomac Canal Center, settled a 1983 lawsuit with the US Justice Department over who owned the land and as part of that settlement agreed to restore the canal lock and create a Waterfront Museum. They later excavated the Tidal Basin and Lock #1, removed the old gate and then covered the original remnants with a reconstruction. They also removed some of the stones that lined the canal and used them to build a small stone feature in Rivergate Park. Other stones were marked with plaques, and put in public places including Beatley Central Library, Fort Ward Park, and Windmill Hill Park. Work on the reconstructed lock was completed in late 1985 and the TransPotomac Canal Center opened in 1987.

The city placed marker at street level above the buried #3 canal lock on N. Royal Street in 1983.

In 1987 the former Hot Shoppe Restaurant at 905 N. Washington Street was razed and the Alexandria Archaeology office took the opportunity to excavate the site, which sat atop the old canal turning basin.

Alexandria named a new park, located on the shores of the Potomac River east of Lee Street between Montgomery and Third streets, "Tide Lock Park" in honor of the canal in 1989.

In 1993, the Waterfront Museum, which opened in 1988, was closed due to low attendance and budget constraints.

In 2022, a condominium called Venue was constructed on top of lock #2 and a marker was added to the courtyard.

A 2024-2025 excavation during the demolition of the Waterman Place office building uncovered lock #4 and the basin just before it at the 900 block of North Pitt Street. It was reburied beneath the new 901 N. Pitt Street building, but some of the cut stones were salvaged and stored for eventual re-use in a public area.

In 2017, during construction on the block between First, Montgomery, St. Asaph and Pitt, archaeologists uncovered the remains of the Turning Basin, just past lock #4. It also included an in-tact and still working culvert that allowed Spa Spring to flow beneath the basin.

In 2026, Arlington Junction Park opened near the old route of the canal and included historical information on it.

== Maps ==
Map of canal

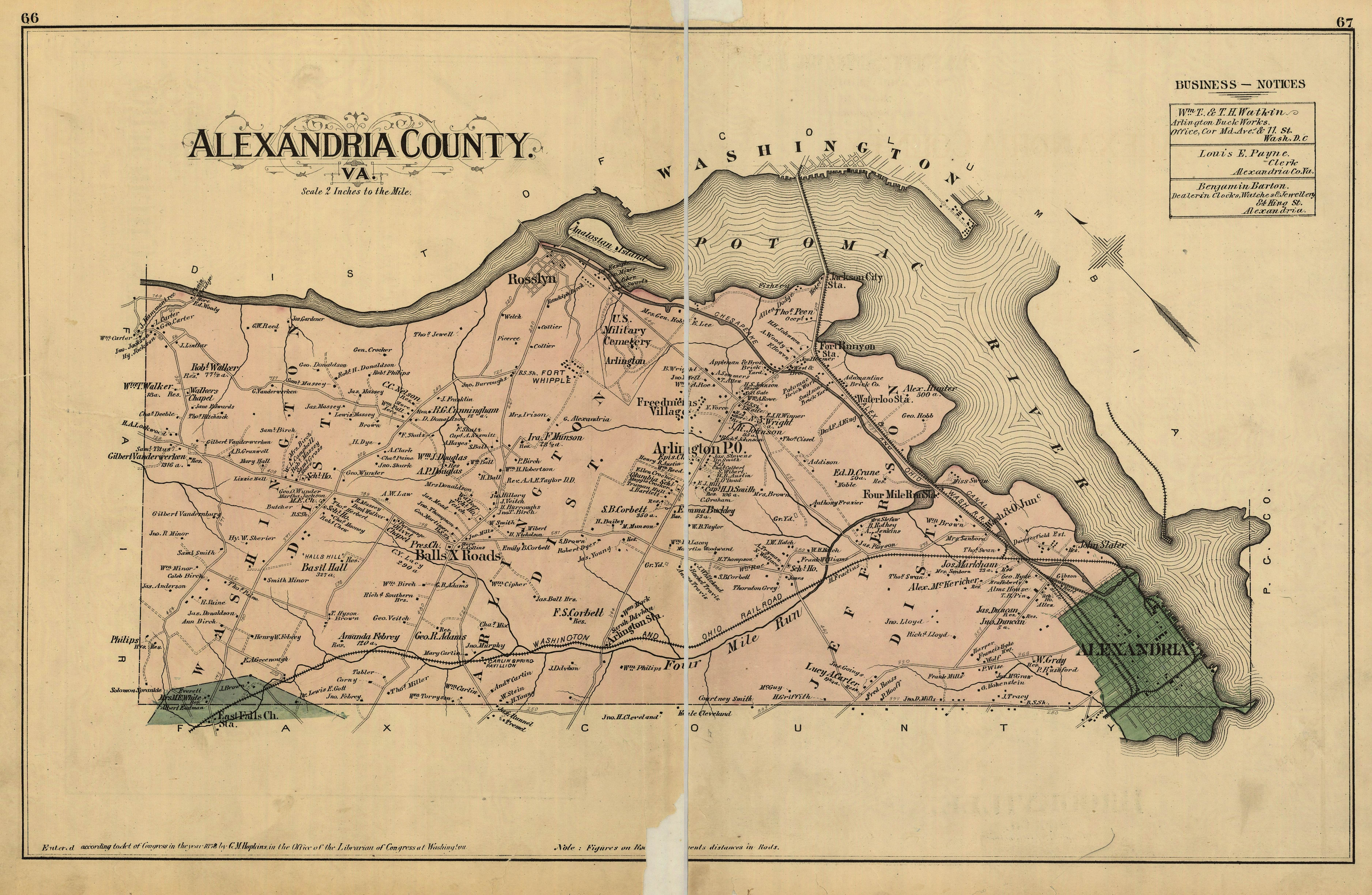
1878 map of Alexandria County, Virginia (now Arlington County, Virginia), showing the route of the Alexandria Canal (identified as the "Chesapeake and Ohio Canal") southwest of the Potomac River
