= Patowmack Canal =

Five canals in Maryland and Virginia, USA

Coordinates: 38°59′22″N 77°14′55″W

- Potomac Canal Historic District
- U.S. National Register of Historic Places
- U.S. National Historic Landmark District
- Virginia Landmarks Register
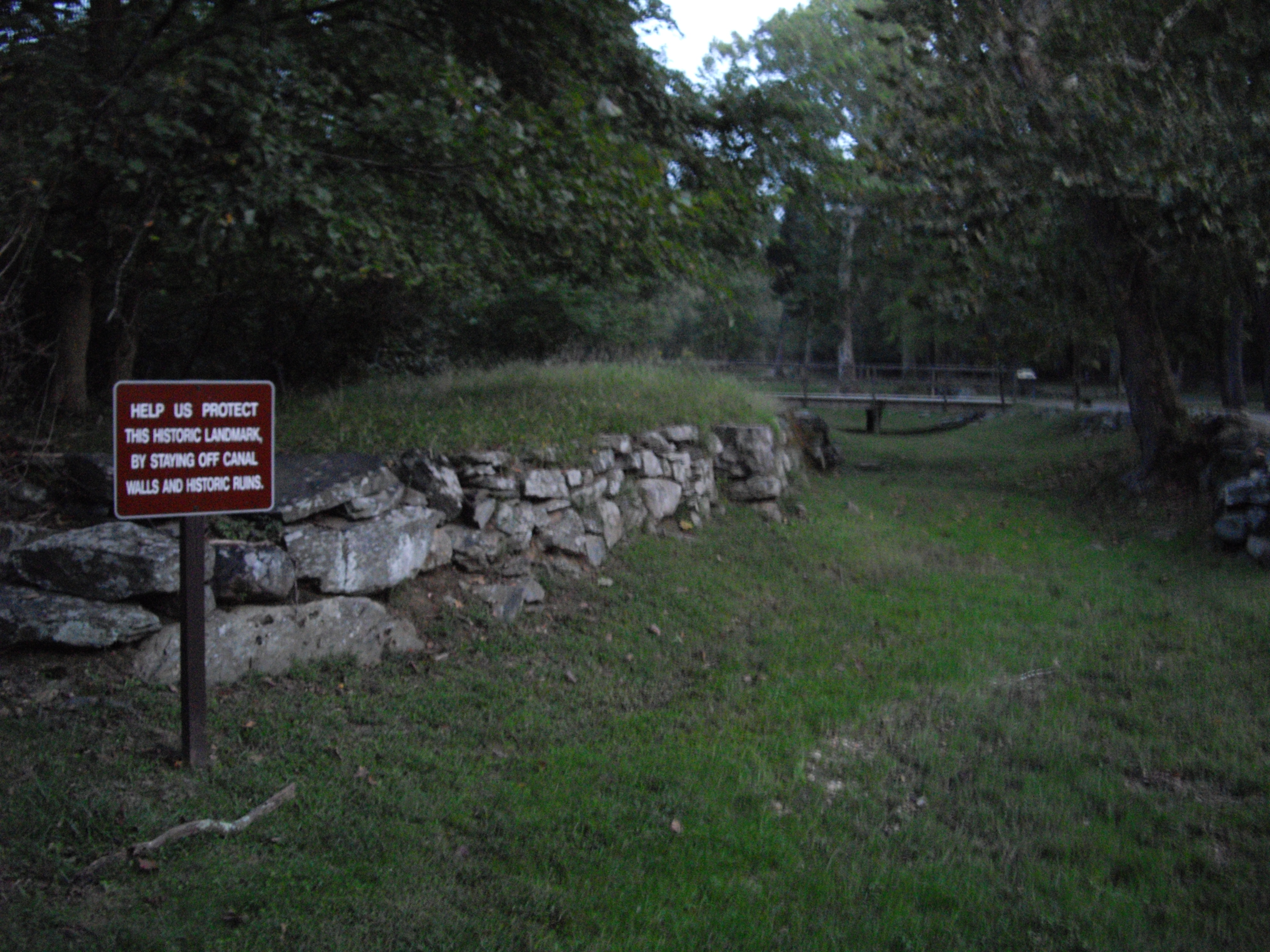
- Location: Fairfax County, Virginia, U.S.
- Nearest city: Great Falls, Virginia, U.S.
- Area: 25 acres (10 ha)
- Built: 1786
- Architect: Multiple
- NRHP reference No.: 79003038
- VLR No.: 029-0211

Significant dates
- Added to NRHP: October 18, 1979
- Designated NHLD: December 17, 1982
- Designated VLR: September 19, 1978

The Patowmack Canal, sometimes called the Potomac Canal, is a series of five inoperative canals located in Maryland and Virginia, United States, that was designed to bypass rapids in the Potomac River upstream of the present Washington, D.C., area. The most well known of them is the Great Falls skirting canal, whose remains are managed by the National Park Service since it is within Great Falls Park, an integral part of the George Washington Memorial Parkway.

The first section of the canal opened in 1795, and the canal ended operations in 1828.

== History ==
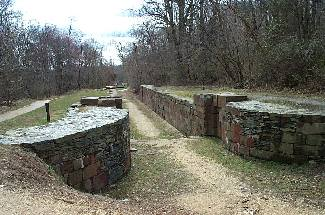
Lock 1 of the Patowmack Canal with rounded pebbles and sand filling the lock for stabilization. The lock is a total of 18 feet (5 m) deep.

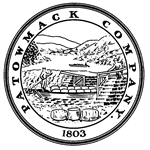
Logo for the Patowmack Company (1785 - 1828), which built the Patowmack Canal

=== Planning the canal ===
Few ventures were dearer to George Washington than his plan to make the Potomac River navigable as far as the Ohio River Valley. In the uncertain period after the Revolutionary War, Washington believed that better transportation and trade would draw lands west of the Allegheny Mountains into the United States and "bind those people to us by a chain which never can be broken."

"The way," Washington wrote, "is easy and dictated by our clearest interest. It is to open a wide door, and make a smooth way for the produce of that Country to pass to our Markets."

As a waterway west, the Potomac River could be that "door." It was the shortest potential route between Tidewater, with access to East Coast and trans-Atlantic trade, and the headwaters of the Ohio River, with access to the western frontier. But both political and physical obstacles had to be overcome.

Opening the Potomac required cooperation of Virginia and Maryland, both of which bordered the river. In 1784, Washington convinced the states' assemblies to establish a company to improve the Potomac between its headwaters near Cumberland, Maryland, and tidewater at Georgetown. The Patowmack Company, organized May 17, 1785, drew directors and subscribers from both states. Then, Washington wrote in his diary, the office of president of the Patowmack Company "fell upon me." He presided over the project until he became the nation's chief executive (President of the United States).

Delegates from Virginia and Maryland, meeting at Washington's home in 1785, drew up the Mount Vernon Compact, providing for free trade on the river. Virginia and Maryland legislators ratified the compact and then invited all 13 states to send delegates to a convention in Annapolis in 1786 "to consider how far a uniform system in their commercial regulations may be necessary to their common interest." The Annapolis Convention led to a general meeting in Philadelphia the following May. Thus, George Washington's lobbying for interstate cooperation on the Potomac helped prepare the way for the Constitutional Convention of 1787.

=== Building the canals ===
Five skirting canals were made: Little Falls, Great Falls, Seneca Falls (across from Seneca Creek), Payne's Falls of the Shenendoah, and House Falls, (near Harpers Ferry, Virginia, now West Virginia). Three of the canals did not require locks: the Seneca Falls, House Falls, and Payne's Falls. Little Falls used wooden locks, which were not meant to be permanent.

At Great Falls, the Potomac presented physical obstacles to travel as well. Narrow and winding in places, it drops over 600 feet in 200 miles from Cumberland to sea level. Spring rains swell the river to dangerous heights; summer droughts can render it impassable. To make the river navigable by even shallow draft boats, the Patowmack Company had to dredge portions of the riverbed and skirt five areas of falls.

==== Little Falls Canal ====
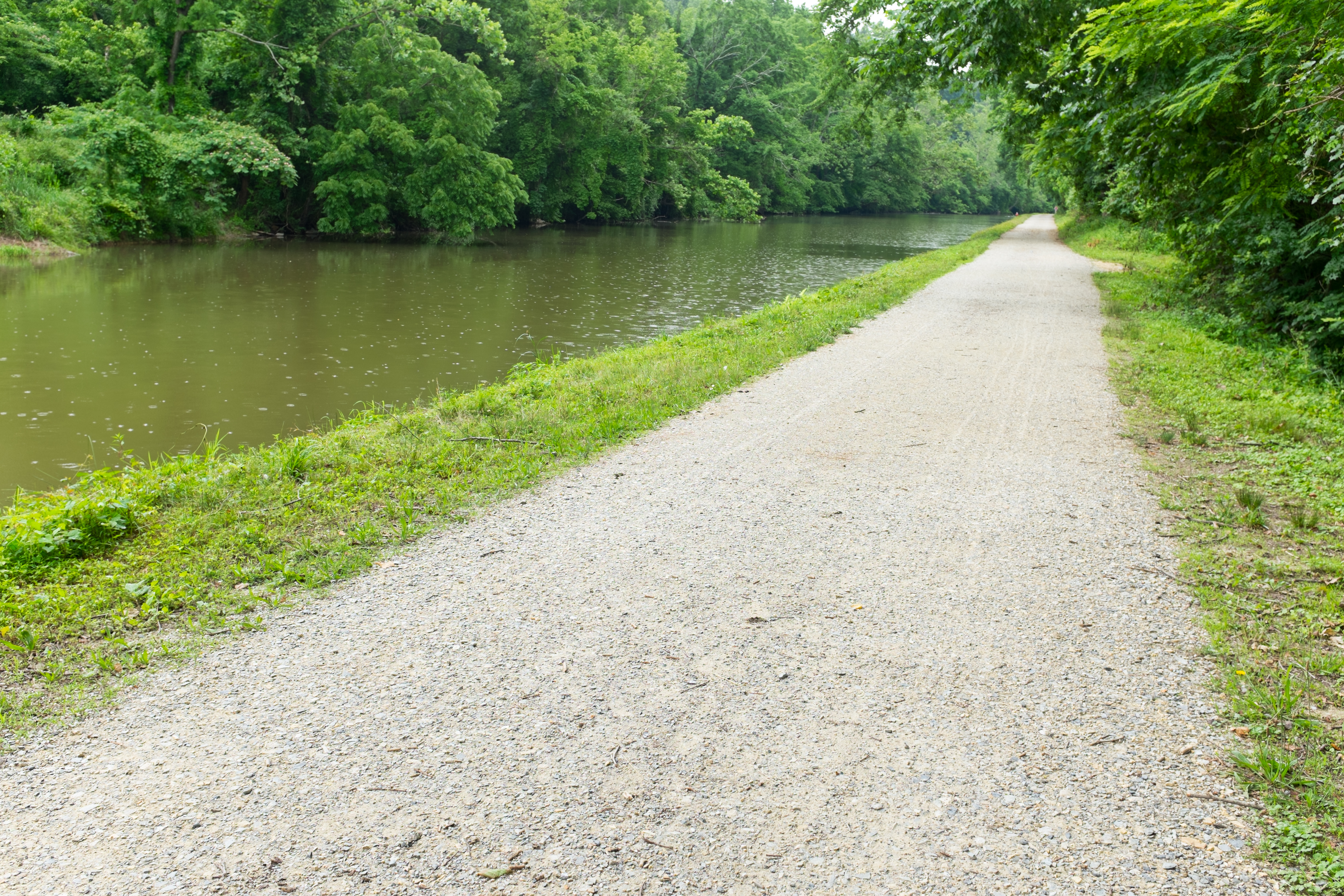
The Little Falls canal was reused for the Chesapeake and Ohio Canal.

The Little Falls canal ran 3814 yards on the Maryland side of the river. The original locks, near today's Fletcher's Boat House, were made of wood, and the canal was finished in 1795. These wooden locks were replaced with stone locks in 1817, and had a lift of 37 feet. The first two locks were named "Martha" and "George" (after Martha Washington and George Washington).

This canal was later repurposed for the Chesapeake and Ohio Canal (C&O), partially as Feeder #1, and as the canal itself from Lock 5 to just before Fletcher's Boat House. The remains of the stone locks were destroyed when the Baltimore and Ohio Railroad (B&O) built its Georgetown Branch line c. 1910. (The rail line was later abandoned and converted to the Capital Crescent Trail in the 1990s.)

==== Great Falls Canal ====
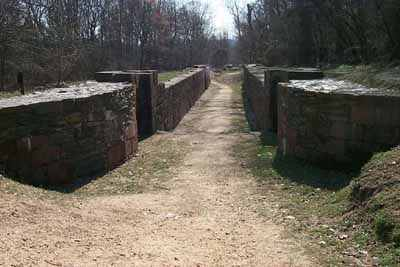
Lock 2 of Patowmack Canal

By far the most demanding task was building a canal with locks to bypass the Great Falls of the Potomac River. Roaring over the rocks, the river drops nearly 80 feet in less than a mile.

Swift currents, solid rock, and constant financial and labor problems hindered progress on the Patowmack Canal at Great Falls.

Construction begun in 1785 and took seventeen years to complete - six years longer than the time required to locate, build, and begin occupying a new federal city, Washington, D.C., ten miles downriver. Construction required engineering skills and a labor force not easily found in 18th century America. Crews consisted of unskilled laborers, skilled indentured servants, and slaves rented from nearby plantations. The work was difficult and dangerous. With one of the earliest uses in this country of black-powder blasting, workers forced a channel through the rock cliffs for the final three locks.

The canal is 1,820 yards long and was completed in 1801, and opened to traffic in 1802. Its five locks raised or lowered boats to skirt around Great Falls, and were constructed of red sandstone from the Seneca Quarry across the river in Maryland. Locking through the whole canal could be accomplished in about an hour.

An entire town grew up around the construction site to serve as headquarters for the Patowmack Company and home for the workers. The town was named Matildaville by its founder, the Revolutionary War hero Light Horse Harry Lee. Harry Lee, the father of Robert E. Lee, named the town for his first wife, Matilda Lee.

==== Seneca Falls Canal ====
This canal was 1,320 yards long and despite going down 7 feet, had no locks, and is on the Virginia side. This was worked on in 1785. This refers to the falls which start just below Seneca Creek, Maryland (this is not to be confused with Seneca Falls, New York where the Cayuga–Seneca Canal was built). It is opposite Dam No. 2 / Violettes Lock on the C&O Canal.

==== Shenandoah or Paynes Falls Canal ====
This canal, just below Harpers Ferry, was 1,760 yards long, dropped 15 feet, and had no locks either. This was also called the Bullring Canal by some boatmen (the falls also being called "Bullring Falls" according to Thomas Moore's 1820 writings), and was made up of two short skirting canals with a "short sheet of water about a quarter mile" between them.

Note: There is a good deal of confusion, even in the Potomac Company Records, to the canals around Harpers Ferry, more than one being called the "Shenandoah Canal" (sometimes inaccurately).

==== House Falls Canal ====
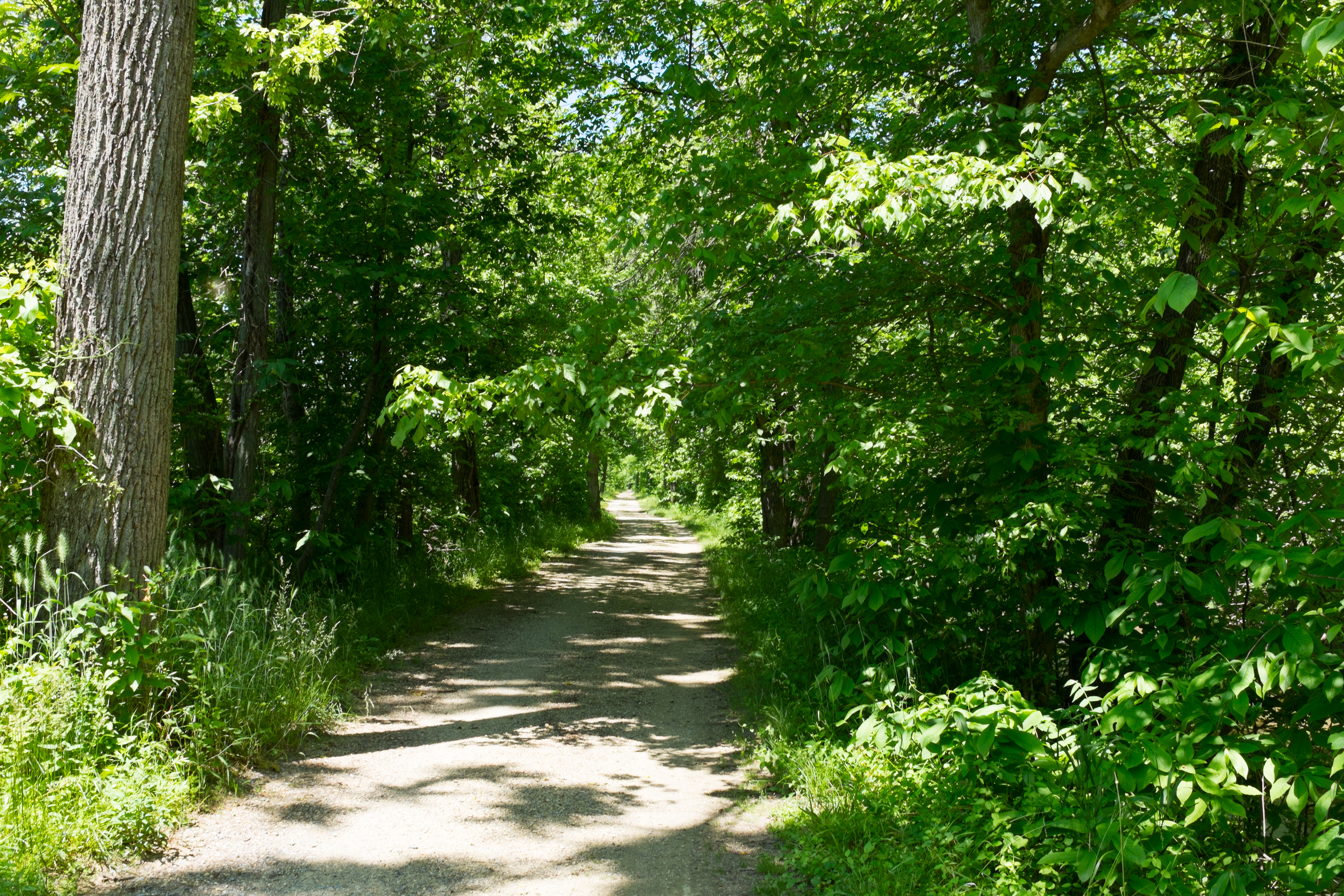
Remains of House Falls / Long Canal / C&O Canal

This Maryland canal, also called the Long Canal, had no locks, and overcame a drop of three feet. This canal was reused for the C&O Canal, between Dam No. 3 and Lock 34 (Goodheart's Lock), according to a 1922 survey, for a distance of almost a mile.

==== Other improvements ====
Some other tributaries to the Potomac had work done on them, such as Conococheague Creek, the Monocacy River, Patterson Creek, South Branch, Cacpon Creek, Opequon Creek, and the Shenandoah River.

=== Operating the canal ===
Matildaville, at its height, boasted the company superintendent's house, a market, grist mill, sawmill, foundry, inn, ice house, workers' barracks, boarding houses, and a sprinkling of small homes. Boaters stopped here to wait their turn through the locks, to change cargo, or to enjoy an evening in town before continuing their journey.

Thousands of boats locked through at Great Falls, carrying flour, whiskey, tobacco, and iron downstream; carrying cloth, hardware, firearms, and other manufactured products upstream. Vessels varied from crudely constructed rafts to the long narrow "sharper," a keelboat that could carry up to 20 tons of cargo. The trip took 3 to 5 days down to Georgetown and 10 to 12 days poling against the current back to Cumberland. Many boat owners simply sold their boats for scrap and walked back instead.

Here is a sample of what was carried down in 1811:

Item	Qty
Sugar	27 hogsheads
Flour	118,076 barrels
Whiskey	5718 barrels
Wheat	465 bushels
Corn	3600 bushels

Also carried in 1811 were firearms, pig iron, timber, rye, flax seed, hemp, butter oats, cloverseed, and staves.

Gondolas were one-use log rafts, about 60 by 10 feet, and held many tons of cargo. Sharpers were flatbottomed boats 60 feet by 7 feet. These also were poled down the river, but were not used as much, since they could only get through the shallows of the Potomac 45 days per year during spring flooding. Wrecks and loss of cargo were probably frequent, since it is written that the people of Cooney (a hamlet near Little Falls) was well supplied with coal, flour, meat (etc.) from wrecks.

Although the charter required year-round operation, the canal operated seasonally, from February until May. Summer droughts shut down operation until rains in the autumn.

Built to support the canal industry, Matildaville's fate was tied to that of the Patowmack Company. Today, only a few fragile remains of Matildaville are visible.

The greatest obstacle to the Patowmack project proved to be financial. High construction costs, particularly at the Great Falls section, and insufficient revenues bankrupted the company. Extremes of high and low water restricted use of the canal to only a month or two each year. The tolls collected could not even pay interest on the company debt.

They planned to make more improvements on other major branches of the Potomac but doing so did nothing to increase the company's revenues. They issued more stock, borrowed from banks, and even tried a lottery all to no avail.

=== End of canal operations ===
The Erie Canal opened in 1825, and immediately became a rival, controlling a connection between the Great Lakes and the Eastern Seaboard. The Patowmack Company folded in 1828, turning over its assets and liabilities to the newly formed C&O Canal Company. The new company abandoned the Patowmack Canal (except for the section at Little Falls) in 1830 for an even more ambitious undertaking: a man-made waterway stretching from Georgetown to Pittsburgh. Although the Patowmack Company was a financial failure, its builders pioneered lock engineering and stimulated a wave of canal construction important to the country's development.

Groundbreaking for the C&O Canal took place close to Lock 6, near the upstream side of the Little Falls Skirting Canal. In the end, the Little Falls skirting canal was modified and repurposed for the C&O Canal prism as well as becoming its feeder canal (Inlet #1), after some modifications. From Lock 5 to almost Fletcher's Boat House is the bed of the Little Falls Skirting Canal.

The Shenandoah canal (i.e. canal on the Shenandoah River) was still used occasionally, and was the reason why the C&O canal had to build the Shenandoah river lock (just below Lock 33) at Harper's Ferry, to get cooperation from the Virginia state legislature. Boats were to leave the C&O Canal, with the mules crossing over the B&O railroad bridge, bringing them to the Shenandoah, letting them go through the canal there.

George Washington did not live to see the completion of the navigation project that had been his obsession since youth. But he did take pride in visiting the canal during the construction to inspect its progress. He died in 1799, two years before the canal opened at Great Falls. But in the long run Washington's vision of a strong nation linked by a direct, long-distance trade network came true. His frequent toast, "Success to the navigation of the Potomac!" became a footnote of American history.

== Current recreational use ==
In 1930 the U.S. Congress authorized the canals as a park. The National Park Service took on responsibility for its management in 1966.

The preservation of the Patowmack Canal is part of the Park Service's continuing efforts to protect and preserve special resources of the park. The Patowmack Canal and Matildaville ruins are protected by the Archaeological Resources Protection Act of 1979. This law prohibits excavation, removal, or displacement of archaeological resources. The significance of the Patowmack Canal in the development of the young nation is evident in its designation as a National Historic Landmark. The Patowmack Canal is a National Historic Civil Engineering Landmark, and a Virginia Historic Landmark.

The remains of the Seneca canal still exist on the Virginia side, opposite Violette's lock (on the C&O Canal).

=== Visitor information ===
Great Falls Park is open to the public daily, with an admission fee.

Safety is a primary concern in the Park. Prohibited activities include alcohol, open fires, swimming, wading or crossing of any open water. Sporting activities such as rock climbing and kayaking at Great Falls Park should be conducted only by experienced persons familiar with the dangers and safety protocols involved therein. These are dangerous grounds and accidental deaths are not uncommon. The park had 27 deaths between 2001 and 2013.

The Patowmack Canal Trail is accessible by wheelchair as far as Lock 1. The trail surface consists of compacted soil with no curbs. The National Park Service opened a wheelchair accessible overlook to the Great Falls in January 2005 and was renovating a second overlook to the Great Falls due for completion in late May 2005.

The Great Falls section of the canal, along with the archaeological remains of Matildaville and other nearby canal-related sites, were designated a National Historic Landmark in 1982, as one of the nation's earliest efforts at large-scale civil engineering, reflective of the visions of two of its Founding Fathers, George Washington and James Madison.

== See also ==
- List of National Historic Landmarks in Virginia
- National Register of Historic Places listings in Fairfax County, Virginia
