= Elko Tract =

Tract of land in Virginia, United States

Coordinates: 37.4868°N 77.2379°W

Elko Tract is a 2,220-acre (9 km^{2}) tract of land in Henrico County, Virginia. It was the site of a decoy airfield during World War II, and was later used for bombing practice.

It was later partially developed as an African-American mental hospital, but that project was abandoned.

It was sometimes referred to as a ghost town, but was never an actual town. It is currently the site of several industrial buildings.

== World War II ==
The history of the tract prior to World War II is unremarkable. During the war, however, the area was converted into a false city, its structure closely resembling that of Richmond. Richmond sat nearby to the west of the tract. It is widely accepted that the premise behind the work was to serve as a decoy for German or Japanese bombers on night raids. In theory, when reports would come from the eastern Virginia cities that enemy bombers were flying overhead, the city would cut power to its residents and businesses. At the same time, the lights would come up on Elko Tract - roads built in roughly the same pattern as the city, and a false landing strip arranged identically to the nearby airport, would convince the bombers that they had reached their target. The bombs would then harmlessly fall on an uninhabited stretch of land, and the bombers would return, thinking they had successfully attacked Richmond.

World War II ended without any attempt by the Axis powers to attack Richmond.

== Later use ==
The site was later used for infantry training and bombing practice. Control of the land was passed to the Commonwealth of Virginia, and it was zoned for industrial use, but remained undeveloped for decades.

In the late 1990s, it was redeveloped and became the site of several industrial facilities.

== See also ==
- List of ghost towns in Virginia
