= List of magisterial districts in Virginia =

Virginia county electoral districts

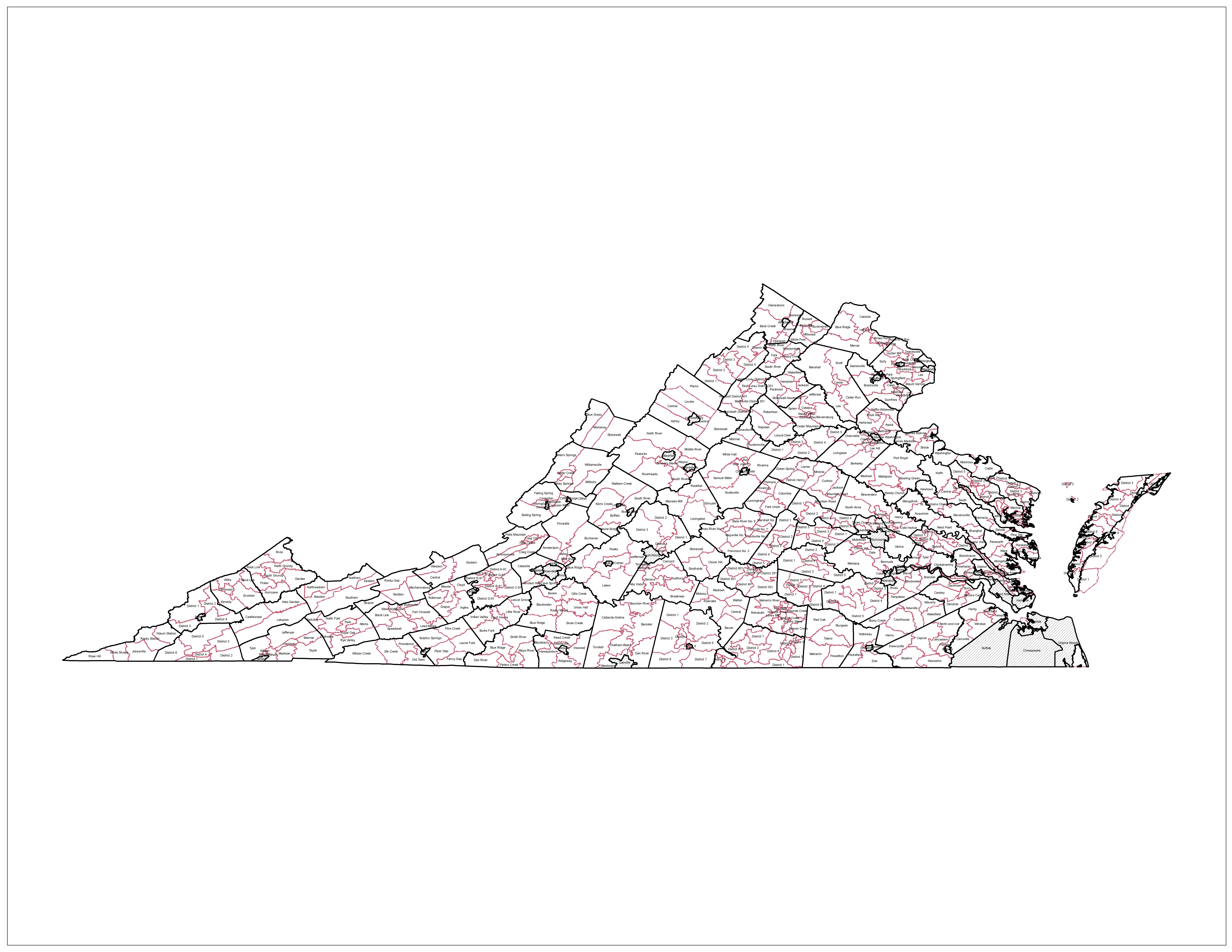
Map illustrating Virginia's magisterial districts. Independent cities are hatched and do not have magisterial districts.

The Commonwealth of Virginia is divided into 95 counties and 38 independent cities, which are considered county-equivalents for census purposes. All counties, with the exception of Arlington County, are further subdivided into magisterial districts. Magisterial districts are defined by the United States Census Bureau as a minor civil division that is a nonfunctioning subdivision used in conducting elections or recording land ownership, and are not governments. These districts are unique to counties only and do not exist in Virginia's 38 independent cities. The only other state to use magisterial districts outside Virginia is West Virginia.

List of the 458 magisterial districts in the Commonwealth of Virginia:

== Accomack County ==
- District 1
- District 2
- District 3
- District 4
- District 5
- District 6
- District 7
- District 8
- District 9

== Albemarle County ==
- Jack Jouett
- Rio
- Rivanna
- Samuel Miller
- Scottsville
- White Hall

== Alleghany County ==
- Boiling Springs
- Clifton Forge East
- Clifton Forge West
- Covington
- Falling Spring
- Jackson River
- Sharon

== Amelia County ==
- District 1
- District 2
- District 3
- District 4
- District 5

== Amherst County ==
- Courthouse
- Elon
- Madison
- Pedlar
- Temperance

== Appomattox County ==
- Clover Hill
- Southside
- Stonewall

== Augusta County ==
- Beverley Manor
- Middle River
- North River
- Pastures
- Riverheads
- South River
- Wayne

== Bath County ==
- Cedar Creek
- Millboro
- Valley Springs
- Warm Springs
- Williamsville

== Bedford County ==
- Blue Ridge
- Center
- Forest
- Jefferson
- Lakes
- Peaks

== Bland County ==
- Mechanicsburg
- Rocky Gap
- Seddon
- Sharon

== Botetourt County ==
- Amsterdam
- Blue Ridge
- Buchanan
- Fincastle
- Valley

== Brunswick County ==
- Meherrin
- Powellton
- Red Oak
- Sturgeon
- Totaro

== Buchanan County ==
- Garden
- Hurricane
- Knox
- North Grundy
- Prater
- Rock Lick
- South Grundy

== Buckingham County ==
- Curdsville
- Francisco
- Gold Hill
- James River
- Marshall
- Maysville
- Slate River

== Campbell County ==
- Altavista
- Brookneal
- Concord
- Rustburg
- Seneca
- Sunburst
- Timberlake

== Caroline County ==
- Bowling Green
- Madison
- Mattaponi
- Port Royal
- Reedy Church
- Western Caroline

== Carroll County ==
- Fancy Gap
- Laurel Fork
- Pine Creek
- Piper Gap
- Sulphur Springs

== Charles City County ==
Charles City County no longer lists the named districts on their website, and now refers to the districts numerically.

- District 1 (Harrison)
- District 2 (Tyler)
- District 3 (Chickahominy)

== Charlotte County ==
- Bacon
- Central
- Madison
- Midway
- Roanoke
- Walton

== Chesterfield County ==
- Bermuda
- Clover Hill
- Dale
- Matoaca
- Midlothian
- Manchester (until 1910)

== Clarke County ==
- Buckmarsh
- Millwood
- Russell
- White Post

== Craig County ==
- Craig City
- Craig Creek
- New Castle
- Potts Mountain
- Simmonsville

== Culpeper County ==
- Catalpa
- Cedar Mountain
- East Fairfax
- Jefferson
- Salem
- Stevensburg
- West Fairfax

== Cumberland County ==
- District 1
- District 2
- District 3
- District 4
- District 5

== Dickenson County ==
- Clintwood
- Ervinton
- Kenady
- Sandlick
- Willis

== Dinwiddie County ==
- District 1
- District 2
- District 3
- District 4
- District 5

== Fairfax County ==
- Braddock
- Dranesville
- Franconia
- Hunter Mill
- Mason
- Mount Vernon
- Providence
- Springfield
- Sully

== Fauquier County ==
- Cedar Run
- Center
- Lee
- Marshall
- Scott

== Floyd County ==
- Burks Fork
- Courthouse
- Indian Valley
- Little River
- Locust Grove

== Fluvanna County ==
- Columbia
- Cunningham
- Fork Union
- Palmyra
- Rivanna

== Franklin County ==
- Blackwater
- Blue Ridge
- Boone
- Gills Creek
- Rocky Mount
- Snow Creek
- Union Hall

== Frederick County ==
- Back Creek
- Gainesboro
- Opequon
- Shawnee
- Stonewall
- Red Bud

== Giles County ==
- Central
- Eastern
- Western

== Gloucester County ==
- Abingdon
- Gloucester
- Petsworth
- Ware
- York

== Goochland County ==
- District 1
- District 2
- District 3
- District 4
- District 5

== Grayson County ==
- Elk Creek
- Old Towne
- Providence
- Wilson Creek

== Greene County ==
- Monroe
- Ruckersville
- Stanardsville

== Greensville County ==
- Belfield
- Hicksford
- Nottoway
- Zion

== Halifax County ==
- District 1
- District 2
- District 3
- District 4
- District 5
- District 6
- District 7
- District 8

== Hanover County ==
- Ashland
- Beaverdam
- Chickahominy
- Cold Harbor
- Henry
- Mechanicsville
- South Anna

== Henrico County ==
- Brookland
- Fairfield
- Three Chopt
- Tuckahoe
- Varina

== Henry County ==
- Blackberry
- Collinsville
- Horsepasture
- Iriswood
- Reed Creek
- Ridgeway

== Highland County ==
- Blue Grass
- Monterey
- Stonewall

== Isle of Wight County ==
- Carrsville
- Hardy
- Newport
- Smithfield
- Windsor

== James City County ==
- Berkeley
- Jamestown
- Powhatan
- Roberts
- Stonehouse

== King and Queen County ==
- Buena Vista
- Newtown
- Shanghai
- St. Stephens Church
- Stevensville

== King George County ==
- Dahlgren
- Shiloh
- Monroe
- Madison

== King William County ==
- Acquinton
- Mangohick
- West Point

== Lancaster County ==
- Bayside
- Lancaster
- Mantua
- White Chapel
- White Stone

== Lee County ==
- Jonesville
- Rocky Station
- Rose Hill
- White Shoals
- Yokum Station

== Loudoun County ==
- Algonkian
- Ashburn
- Blue Ridge
- Broad Run
- Catoctin
- Dulles
- Leesburg
- Sterling

== Louisa County ==
- Cuckoo
- Green Springs
- Jackson
- Louisa
- Mineral
- Mountain Road
- Patrick Henry

== Lunenburg County ==
- Beaver Creek
- Brown's Store
- Hounds Creek
- Love's Mill
- Meherrin River
- Plymouth
- Rehoboth

== Madison County ==
- Locust Dale
- Rapidan
- Robertson

== Mathews County ==
- Chesapeake
- Piankatank
- Westville

== Mecklenburg County ==
- District 1
- District 2
- District 3
- District 4
- District 5
- District 6
- District 7
- District 8
- District 9

== Middlesex County ==
- Jamaica
- Pinetop
- Saluda

== Montgomery County ==
- District A
- District B
- District C
- District D
- District E
- District F
- District G

== Nelson County ==
- Lovingston
- Massies Mill
- Rockfish
- Schuyler

== New Kent County ==
- District 1
- District 2
- District 3
- District 4
- District 5

== Northampton County ==
- District 1
- District 2
- District 3
- District 4
- District 5

== Northumberland County ==
- District 1
- District 2
- District 3
- District 4
- District 5

== Nottoway County ==
- District 1
- District 2
- District 3
- District 4
- District 5

== Orange County ==
- District 1
- District 2
- District 3
- District 4
- District 5

== Page County ==
- East Luray
- Marksville
- Newport
- Shenandoah
- West Luray

== Patrick County ==
- Blue Ridge
- Dan River
- Mayo River
- Peters Creek
- Smith River

== Pittsylvania County ==
- Banister
- Callands-Gretna
- Chatham-Blairs
- Dan River
- Staunton River
- Tunstall
- Westover

== Powhatan County ==
- District 1
- District 2
- District 3
- District 4
- District 5

== Prince Edward County ==
- District 101
- District 201
- District 301
- District 401
- District 501
- District 601
- District 701
- District 801

== Prince George County ==
- Blackwater
- Bland
- Brandon
- Rives
- Templeton
- Clements

== Prince William County ==
- Brentsville
- Coles
- Potomac
- Gainesville
- Neabsco
- Occoquan
- Woodbridge

== Pulaski County ==
- Cloyd
- Draper
- Ingles
- Massie
- Robinson

== Rappahannock County ==
- Hampton
- Jackson
- Piedmont
- Stonewall-Hawthorne
- Wakefield

== Richmond County ==
- District 1
- District 2
- District 3
- District 4
- District 5

== Roanoke County ==
- Catawba
- Cave Spring
- Hollins
- Vinton
- Windsor Hills

== Rockbridge County ==
- Buffalo
- Kerrs Creek
- Natural Bridge
- South River
- Walkers Creek
- Lexington

== Rockingham County ==
- Ashby
- Central
- Linville
- Plains
- Stonewall

== Russell County ==
- Castlewood
- Lebanon
- New Garden

== Scott County ==
- District 1
- District 2
- District 3
- District 4
- District 5
- District 6

== Shenandoah County ==
- District 1 (New Market)
- District 2 (Mount Jackson)
- District 3 (Edinburg)
- District 4 (Woodstock)
- District 5 (Toms Brook)
- District 6 (Strasburg)

== Smyth County ==
- Atkins
- Chilhowie
- Northfork
- Park
- Royal Oak
- Rye Valley
- Saltville

== Southampton County ==
- Berlin and Ivor
- Boykins
- Capron
- Drewryville
- Franklin
- Jerusalem
- Newsoms

== Spotsylvania County ==
- Battlefield
- Berkeley
- Chancellor
- Courtland
- Lee Hill
- Livingston
- Salem

== Stafford County ==
- Aquia
- Falmouth
- Garrisonville
- George Washington
- Griffis-Widewater
- Hartwood
- Rockhill

== Surry County ==
- Bacons Castle
- Carsley
- Claremont
- Dendron
- Surry

== Sussex County ==
- Blackwater
- Courthouse
- Henry
- Stony Creek
- Wakefield
- Waverly

== Tazewell County ==
- Eastern
- Northern
- Northwestern
- Southern
- Western

== Warren County ==
- Fork
- North River
- Happy Creek
- Shenandoah
- South River

== Washington County ==
- Harrison
- Jefferson
- Madison
- Monroe
- Taylor
- Tyler
- Wilson

== Westmoreland County ==
- Cople
- Montross
- Washington

== Wise County ==
- Gladeville
- Lipps
- Roberson
- Richmond

== Wythe County ==
- Blacklick
- East Wytheville
- Fort Chiswell
- Lead Mines
- Speedwell
- West Wytheville

== York County ==
- District 1
- District 2
- District 3
- District 4
- District 5
