= Lignite, Virginia =

Unincorporated area in the United States

Lignite
- Ghost town
- Location within the Commonwealth of Virginia Lignite (the United States)
- Coordinates: 37°37′38″N 79°59′54″W
- Country: United States
- State: Virginia
- County: Botetourt
- Time zone: UTC-5 (Eastern (EST))
  - Summer (DST): UTC-4 (EDT)

Lignite is a ghost town in Botetourt County, Virginia, United States. A former lignite mining town owned by Allegheny Ore and Iron Company (which later became a subsidiary of Lukens Steel Company in 1907, it contained a company store, churches, school, post office, and a main street theater. It was abandoned by the company in the 1920s after ore demands dropped, when higher grade coal was discovered in Pennsylvania, but some people continued to live in the houses until the 1950s. It has very few remains and is now a part of the Jefferson National Forest.

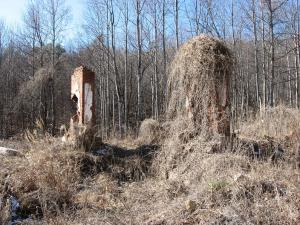
The remains of a chimney, covered in brush
