= Turkeycock Wildlife Management Area =

Protected area of Virginia, United States

- IUCN category V (protected landscape/seascape)
- Location within Virginia Location within the United States
- Location: Franklin and Henry counties, Virginia, United States
- Nearest city: Martinsville
- Coordinates: 36°49′13″N 79°42′22″W
- Area: 2,679 acres (10.84 km^{2})
- Governing body: Virginia Department of Game and Inland Fisheries

Turkeycock Wildlife Management Area is a 2,679-acre (10.84 km^{2}) Wildlife Management Area (WMA) along the ridge of Turkeycock Mountain northeast of Martinsville, Virginia. It straddles the border between Franklin and Henry counties. The area is primarily forest, with several open areas for wildlife located around the property. The lowest elevation is 1,100 feet (340 m) above sea level, while the highest is over 1,700 feet (520 m). A number of small streams drain the land, and a pond is located near its southwestern corner. Most wildlife management in the area has been limited to improving timber quality through the sale of wood.

Turkeycock WMA is owned and maintained by the Virginia Department of Game and Inland Fisheries. The area is open to the public for hunting, trapping, fishing, hiking, horseback riding, and primitive camping. Access for persons 17 years of age or older requires a valid hunting or fishing permit, or a WMA access permit.

== See also ==
- List of Virginia Wildlife Management Areas
