= Seneca River (Virginia) =

Coordinates: 37°5′24.51″N 79°7′23.01″W

Location
- Country: United States

Physical characteristics
- Source
  - location: Virginia

The Seneca River or Seneca Creek is a river in the United States state of Virginia.

== See also ==
- List of rivers of Virginia
