= National Register of Historic Places listings in Franklin County, Virginia =

Location of Franklin County in Virginia

This is a list of the National Register of Historic Places listings in Franklin County, Virginia.

This is intended to be a complete list of the properties and districts on the National Register of Historic Places in Franklin County, Virginia, United States. The locations of National Register properties and districts for which the latitude and longitude coordinates are included below, may be seen in an online map.

There are 26 properties and districts listed on the National Register in the county.

This National Park Service list is complete through NPS recent listings posted March 6, 2026.

== Current listings ==
	Name on the Register	Image	Date listed	Location	City or town	Description
1	Bleak Hill	Bleak Hill	November 21, 2002 (#02001374)	215 Bleak Hill Ln. 36°58′13″N 80°02′08″W	Callaway	
2	Boones Mill Depot	Boones Mill Depot	June 5, 2017 (#100001042)	Digby Greene Rd. and Depot Dr. 37°06′57″N 79°56′51″W	Boones Mill	
3	Boones Mill Historic District	Boones Mill Historic District	August 25, 2014 (#14000526)	U.S. Route 220, Maggodee Ln., Bethlehem, Dogwood Hill, and Boones Mill Rds., and Boon, Easy, and Church Hill Sts. 37°06′58″N 79°57′18″W	Boones Mill	
4	Booth-Lovelace House	Booth-Lovelace House	September 14, 2002 (#02000996)	130 Lovelace Ln. 37°10′18″N 79°52′00″W	Hardy	
5	Bowman Farm	Bowman Farm	April 13, 2000 (#00000314)	1605 Cahas Mountain Rd. 37°06′01″N 80°01′04″W	Boones Mill	
6	Brooks-Brown House	Brooks-Brown House	November 2, 1989 (#89001930)	Truevine Rd. north of Snow Creek Rd. 36°55′17″N 79°42′27″W	Dickinson	
7	Burwell-Holland House	Burwell-Holland House	June 6, 2002 (#02000624)	600 Jacks Mountain Rd. 36°58′38″N 79°44′26″W	Glade Hill	
8	Cahas Mountain Rural Historic District	Cahas Mountain Rural Historic District	June 7, 1996 (#96000593)	From the peak of Cahas Mountain to near the Roanoke County line, near the junction of U.S. Route 220 and Naff Rd. 37°08′03″N 79°59′09″W	Boones Mill	
9	John Craghead House	John Craghead House	March 24, 2022 (#100007571)	1609 Windlass Rd. 37°06′10″N 79°38′56″W	Moneta vicinity	
10	Gwin Dudley Home Site	Gwin Dudley Home Site	January 30, 2008 (#07000827)	Twin Chimneys Dr. 37°02′52″N 79°41′20″W	Wirtz	
11	Jubal A. Early House	Jubal A. Early House	December 11, 1997 (#97001507)	Northwest of the junction of State Route 116 and Boones Mill Rd. 37°09′47″N 79°52′50″W	Boones Mill	
12	Evergreen-Callaway-Deyerle House	Evergreen-Callaway-Deyerle House	December 9, 1999 (#99001504)	536 Coles Creek Rd. 37°00′57″N 79°58′25″W	Rocky Mount	
13	The Farm	The Farm	November 2, 1989 (#89001910)	Lawndale Dr. 36°59′21″N 79°53′35″W	Rocky Mount	
14	Ferrum College Historic District	Ferrum College Historic District	October 29, 2013 (#13000889)	215 Ferrum Mountain Rd. 36°55′35″N 80°01′14″W	Ferrum	
15	Finney-Lee House	Finney-Lee House	May 23, 1997 (#97000484)	0.75 miles (1.21 km) north of the junction of Sutton Hollow and Snow Creek Rds. 36°50′09″N 79°47′45″W	Snow Creek	
16	Greer House	Greer House	December 28, 1990 (#90002011)	206 E. Court St. 36°59′41″N 79°53′10″W	Rocky Mount	
17	Holland-Duncan House	Holland-Duncan House	January 28, 2000 (#00000026)	13508 State Route 122; 37°07′14″N 79°42′42″W	Moneta	
18	Hook-Powell-Moorman Farm	Hook-Powell-Moorman Farm	July 21, 1995 (#95000893)	Junction of State Route 122 and Dovetail Rd. 37°08′27″N 79°40′47″W	Hale's Ford	
19	Otter Creek Archaeological Site (44FR31)	Otter Creek Archaeological Site (44FR31)	May 9, 1985 (#85000986)	Off Newcomb Rd. at the headwaters of Otter Creek; 36°56′29″N 80°07′20″W	Ferrum	
20	Piedmont Mill Historic District	Piedmont Mill Historic District	February 27, 2009 (#09000063)	1709 Alean Rd. 37°05′36″N 79°51′17″W	Boones Mill	
21	Rocky Mount Historic District	Rocky Mount Historic District	June 3, 1999 (#99000683)	Roughly bounded by Franklin and Maynor Sts., Floyd Ave., E. Court St., and Maple Ave.; also Orchard Ave. between E. Court and Patterson Sts. 36°59′44″N 79°53′21″W	Rocky Mount	Orchard Ave. represents a boundary increase of May 15, 2008
22	Snow Creek Anglican Church	Snow Creek Anglican Church	February 21, 2017 (#100000676)	436 Old Chapel Rd. 36°55′06″N 79°39′43″W	Penhook	
23	Booker T. Washington National Monument	Booker T. Washington National Monument	October 15, 1966 (#66000834)	15 miles (24 km) east of Rocky Mount on State Route 122; 37°07′14″N 79°43′54″W	Rocky Mount	
24	Washington Iron Furnace	Washington Iron Furnace	March 20, 1973 (#73002014)	108 Old Furnace Rd. 36°59′13″N 79°53′31″W	Rocky Mount	
25	Waverly	Waverly	November 7, 1996 (#96001329)	Northern side of State Route 122 2 miles (3.2 km) northeast of its junction with State Route 116; 37°07′11″N 79°47′28″W	Burnt Chimney	
26	Woods-Meade House	Woods-Meade House	July 8, 1982 (#82004557)	118 Maple St. 36°59′48″N 79°53′16″W	Rocky Mount	

== See also ==
- List of National Historic Landmarks in Virginia
- National Register of Historic Places listings in Virginia
