= List of Confederate monuments and memorials in Virginia =

Confederate monuments and memorials in Virginia

This list of Confederate monuments and memorials in Virginia includes public displays and symbols of the Confederate States of America (CSA), Confederate leaders, or Confederate soldiers of the American Civil War. Part of the commemoration of the American Civil War, these symbols include monuments and statues, flags, holidays and other observances, and the names of schools, roads, parks, bridges, counties, cities, lakes, dams, military bases, and other public works. (Note: "In an effort to assist the efforts of local communities to re-examine these symbols, the SPLC launched a study to catalog them. For the final tally, the researchers excluded nearly 2,600 markers, battlefields, museums, cemeteries and other places or symbols that are largely historical in nature.")

This list does not include items of a more strictly documentary nature, such as historic markers or battlefield parks if they were not established to honor the Confederacy. Nor does it include figures connected with the origins of the Civil War or white supremacy, as distinct from the Confederacy.

As of 24 June 2020, there are at least 239 public spaces with Confederate monuments in Virginia, more than in any other state.

== Bridge ==
- Abingdon: The John Hunt Morgan Bridge, on East Main St./U.S. 11, is named for a Confederate general.
- Richmond: The Robert E. Lee Bridge, on U.S. 301

== Geological features ==
- Rockbridge: The Maury River is named after Matthew Fontaine Maury, who was a Commodore in the Confederate navy.

== Highways ==
- Lee Highway, various locales retain the name for portions of this former auto trail route.
- General Mahone Highway, a large portion of U.S. Route 460, between Petersburg and Suffolk.
- Jefferson Davis Highway, also called Jefferson Davis Memorial Highway. All portions of the highway in the state have been renamed.
- Jubal Early Highway, a section of Virginia Rt. 116 in Franklin County, Virginia, from Roanoke City to Virginia Route 122 in Franklin County, is named after him. It passes his birthplace, identified by a historical highway marker. In Roanoke County, it is referred to as "JAE Valley Road," incorporating Jubal Anderson Early's initials.
- John Mosby Highway, the designation for most of U.S. Route 50 in Virginia, with portions also called Lee Highway, in Fairfax and Arlington, or Lee–Jackson Memorial Highway in Chantilly.
- Stonewall Jackson Highway is a named portion of U.S. Route 340.
- Magruder Boulevard was a named portion of Virginia route 134, and had its name changed to Neil Armstrong Parkway in July 2021.

== Monuments ==
=== Courthouse monuments ===
- Abingdon: Confederate Monument (1907), Frederick William Sievers, sculptor
- Amelia: Confederate Monument (1905)
- Amherst: Amherst County Confederate Monument (1922)
- Appomattox: Confederate Monument (1905)
- Bedford: Confederate Memorial (1935)
- Berryville: Confederate Memorial (1900)
- Bland: Confederate Monument (1911)
- Boydton: Monument to Confederate Soldiers of Mecklenburg (1908; rededicated in 2002)
- Buckingham: Monument and cannon dedicated to the Confederate soldiers of Buckingham County. (1908)
- Charlotte: Charlotte County Confederate Memorial (1901)
- Chatham: Confederate Dead Monument (1899; rededicated in 1967)
- Chesterfield: Confederate Memorial (1903)
- Courtland: Confederate Monument (1905)
- Dinwiddie: Confederate Monument (1909)
- Eastville: Confederate Monument (1913). "Erected by Harmanson-West camp Confederate veterans, the daughters of the Confederacy, and the citizens of the Eastern Shore of Virginia to the soldiers of the Confederacy from Northampton and Accomack Counties. They died bravely in war, or, in peace live nobly to rehabilitate their country. A. D. 1913."
- Emporia: Confederate Memorial (1910)
- Fincastle: Confederate Memorial (1904)
- Floyd: Confederate Monument (1904)
- Front Royal: Confederate Monument (1911)
- Gate City: Confederate Memorial (1988)
- Gloucester: Confederate Monument (1899)
- Halifax: Confederate Memorial (1911)
- Hanover: Confederate Monument (1914)
- Heathsville: Civil War Memorial, Northumberland County (1873)
- Hillsville: Confederate Monument (1907)
- King William: To Our Soldiers of the Confederacy Monument (1901)
- Lancaster: Lancaster County Confederate Monument (1872)
- Lawrenceville: Brunswick County Confederate Monument (1910)
- Louisa: Confederate Monument (1905)
- Lovingston: Confederate Monument (1965)
- Lunenburgh: Confederate Monument (1916)
- Marion: Confederate Monument (1904)
- Mathews: Our Confederate Soldier Monument (1912)
- Monterey: Confederate Monument (1918)
- Montross: Westmoreland County Confederate Monument (1876)
- New Castle: Confederate Monument (1912)
- Nottoway: Confederate Monument (1893)
- Palmyra: Confederate Memorial (1901)
- Pearisburg: Confederate Medal of Honor Monument (1995). Inscribed is the Jefferson Davis quote, "It is a duty we owe to posterity to see that our children shall know the virtues and rise worthy of their sires."
- Powhatan: Powhatan Troop Confederate Memorial (1999)
- Rocky Mount: Confederate Monument (1910)
- Spotsylvania Courthouse: Confederate Monument (1918)
- Smithfield: Confederate Monument (1905)
- Surry: Confederate Monument (1903)
- Sussex: Confederate Monument (1912)
- Tappahannock: Essex County Confederate Monument (1909)
- Tazewell: Confederate Memorial (1903)
- Warm Springs: Confederate Memorial (1922)
- Warrenton:
  - Monument to CSA colonel John S. Mosby (1916)
  - Confederate Dead Monument (1877). Updated in 1998 with aid from the United Daughters of the Confederacy and local businesses.
- Washington: Confederate Monument (1898)
- Williamsburg: Williamsburg Confederate Monument (1908)
- Winchester: Confederate Soldiers Monument (1916) – in front of former courthouse, now museum. Plaque reads: "In honor of the Confederate soldiers from Winchester and Frederick County who faithfully served the South."
- Windsor: Confederate Monument (1905)

=== Other public monuments ===
- Alexandria:
  - Plaques (1870) of Robert E. Lee and George Washington hang on either side of the altar at Christ Church, where both were parishioners. Following a unanimous vote of its board in 2017, the church announced the plaques would be removed in 2018 once a new location of "respectful prominence" is identified.

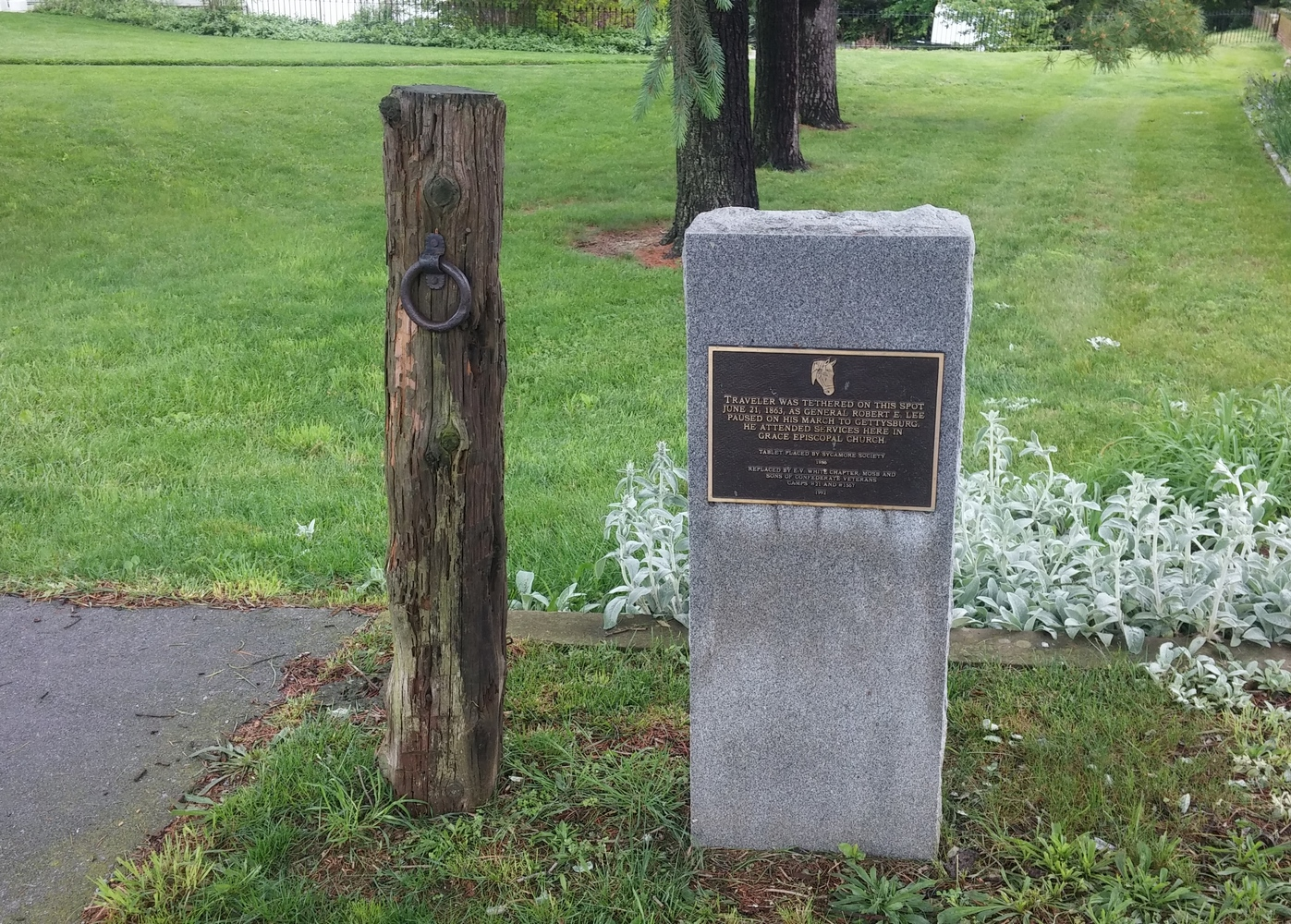
Robert E. Lee hitched his horse in Berryville, Virginia, while on his march to Gettysburg

- Berryville: Memorial (1986) and "hitching post" where Robert E. Lee tethered his horse, Traveller, while Lee "paused on his march to Gettysburg" to attended a church service
- Brandy Station: UDC monument (1998) dedicated to John Pelham
- Bristol: Confederate Soldier Monument (1910)
- Buchanan: Botetourt Artillery Obelisk (1902)
- Buckingham: Confederate Soldiers of Buckingham County (1908)

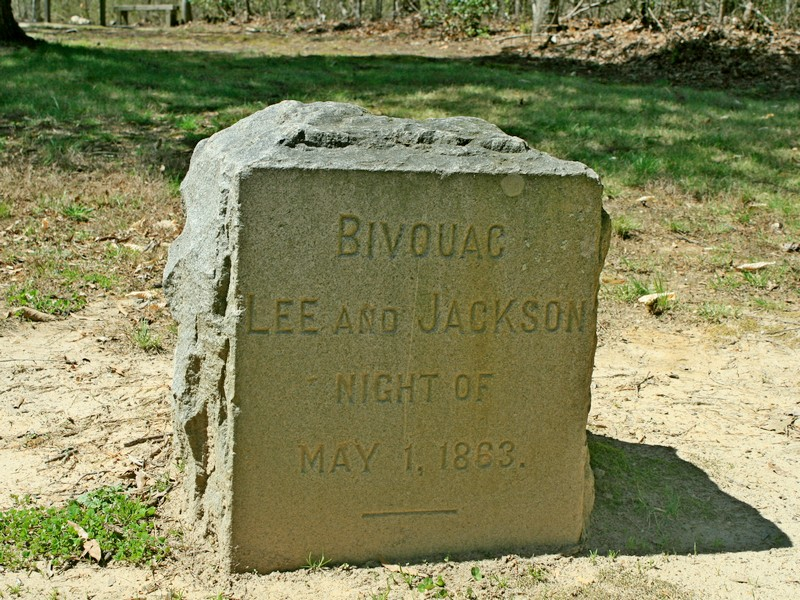
Lee-Jackson Bivouac Shaft, Chancellorsville

- Chancellorsville: Confederate monuments at the site of the Battle of Chancellorsville include:
  - Jackson Memorial Boulder and Tablet (1888), placed by former members of Stonewall Jackson's staff
  - General Thomas J. Jackson Shaft (1888), "On this spot fell mortally wounded Thomas J. Jackson Lt. Gen. C.S.A. May 2nd 1863"
  - Lee-Jackson Bivouac Shaft (1903), "Bivouac, Lee and Jackson, night of May 1, 1863"
  - Lee-Jackson Bivouac Tablet (1937)
  - Brigadier General Elisha F. Paxton Tablet (1980), "In this vicinity Brig. Gen. E. F. Paxton, C.S.A. Aged 35 years, of Rockbridge County, VA. was killed on the morning of May 3, 1863 while leading his command, the Stonewall Brigade in the attack on Fairview"
  - University of Virginia Cemetery: Confederate monument (1893), by Caspar Buberl. Justin Greenlee draws a parallel between the erection of this monument, at whose dedication slavery was denied as a cause of the Civil War, and the adjacent cemetery for slaves, which was robbed of bodies for dissection in UVA's School of Medicine and Anatomy.
- Culpeper County: UDC monument (1929) commemorating Confederate victory in the Battle of Brandy Station
- Franklin: Confederate Monument (1911)
- Fredericksburg
  - Confederate Monument (2009)
  - "The Angel of Marye's Heights" Monument, statue of Sergeant Richard Rowland Kirkland giving water to fallen union soldier. (1965)
  - The Heights at Smith Run (2014)
  - Thomas R.R. Cobb Monument and Marker (1888)
- Glen Allen: J.E.B. Stuart Memorial (1888)
- Gloucester: Confederate Monument (1889)
- Goshen Pass: Maury Memorial, stone monument marker (1923)

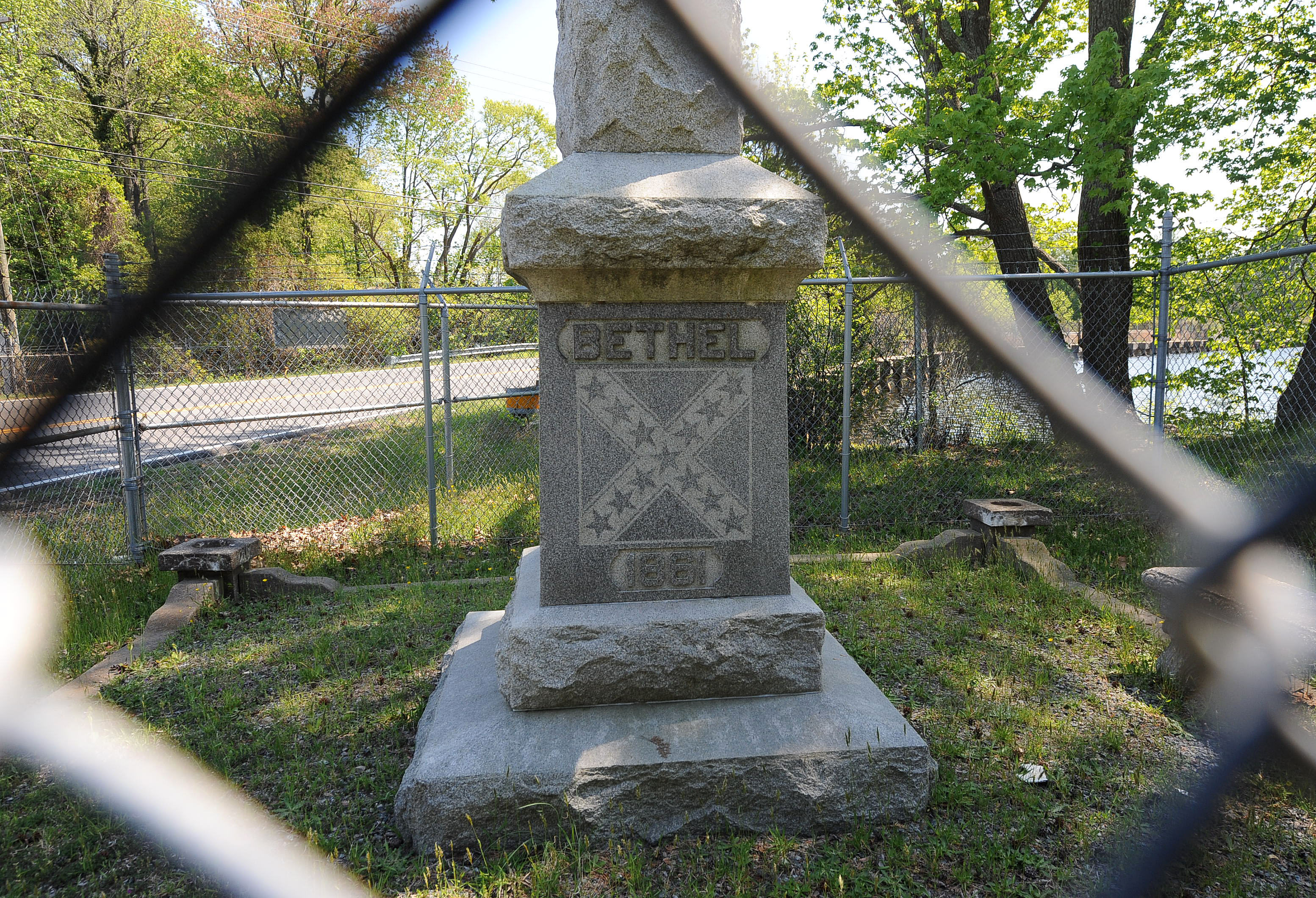
Big Bethel UDC Monument, Langley Air Force Base, Hampton

- Hampton:
  - Two monuments at Big Bethel Cemetery, within Langley Air Force Base:
    - Big Bethel UDC Monument (1905)
    - UDC Monument (1964), commemorating the 100th anniversary of the Battle of Big Bethel
  - Hampton National Cemetery: Two small, granite blocks near the burial location of 272 Confederates are inscribed "To Our Confederate Dead"
- Harrisonburg, Virginia: "Talbot Boys" monument (1914) at the Cross Keys battlefield, moved there from Talbot County Courthouse, Maryland, in 2022.
- Hopewell: Confederate Memorial (1949)

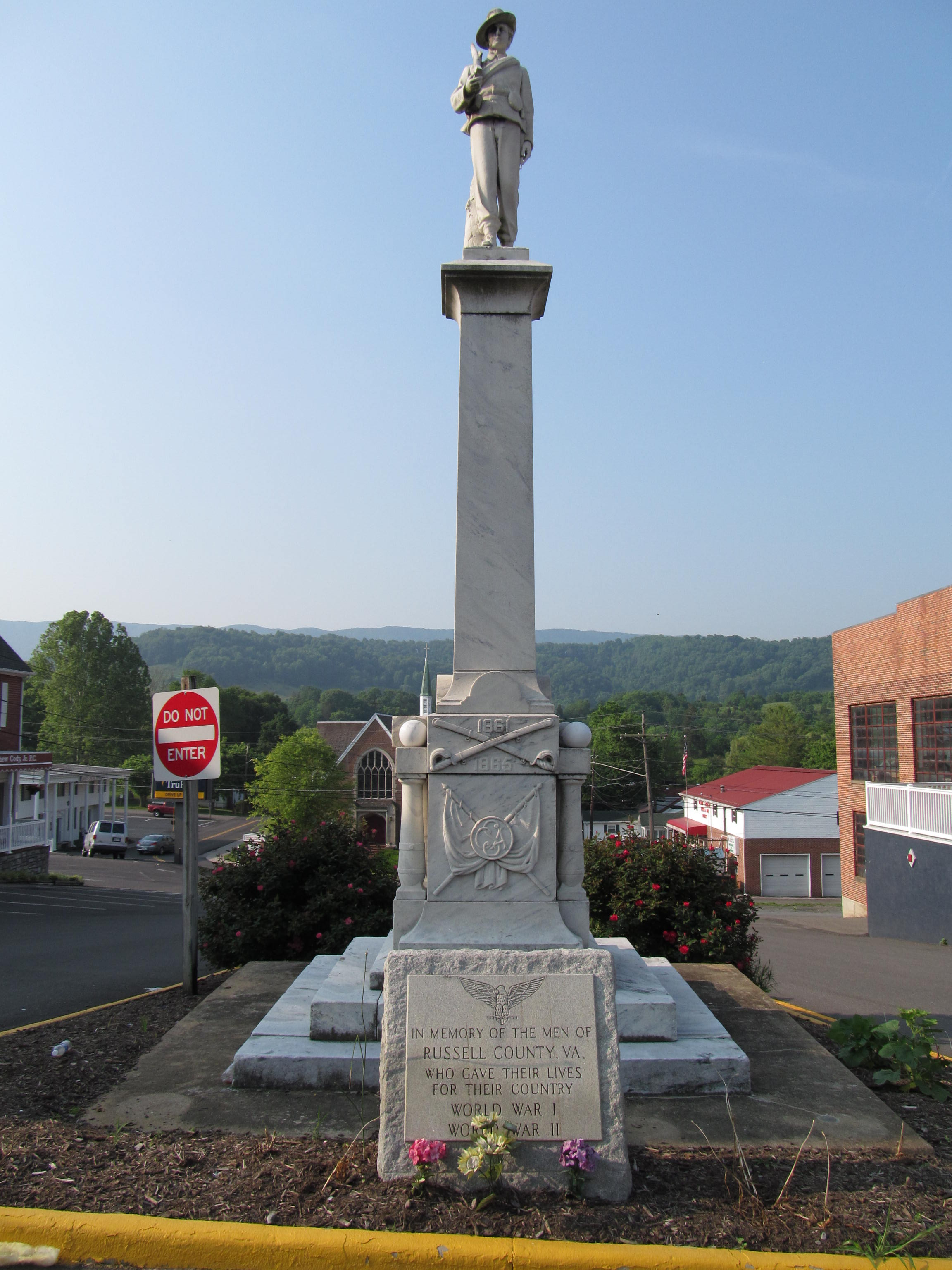
Lebanon, Virginia

- Lebanon: Confederate Monument (1914)
- Lexington
  - Washington and Lee University
    - Previously Washington University, was renamed weeks after Robert E. Lee died as the President of the university.
    - Inside University Chapel, in place of an altar, is a large marble statue of Lee, recumbent, wearing Confederate battle gear and resting on a camp bed. (Lee is buried with his family in a mausoleum beneath the chapel.)
    - Grave of Traveller, Robert E. Lee's horse (1871). Apples are regularly placed on the grave by visitors.
  - Virginia Military Institute
    - Francis H. Smith statue (1931). Smith served in the CSA for four years during his tenure at VMI.
    - Virginia Mourning Her Dead, a bronze statue by Moses Ezekiel, dedicated 1903, moved to current location 1912, "honors the ten cadets from the school who fought and died after being wounded on the battlefield near New Market on May 15, 1864.... A ceremony to commemorate the deaths is held every year at the monument on the anniversary of the battle."
- Luray:
  - Confederate Monument (1898)
  - Page County Confederate Monument (1918)
- Lynchburg:
  - Confederate Monument on Monument Terrace (1900)
  - Fort Early and Jubal Early Monument (1919)
- Mechanicsville: Wilcox's Alabama Brigade (1999)
- Mecklenburg County: Confederate statue in front of the Courthouse.
- Middletown: Monument (1919) to Stephen Dodson Ramseur at entrance to Belle Grove Plantation, where he died following the Battle of Belle Grove.

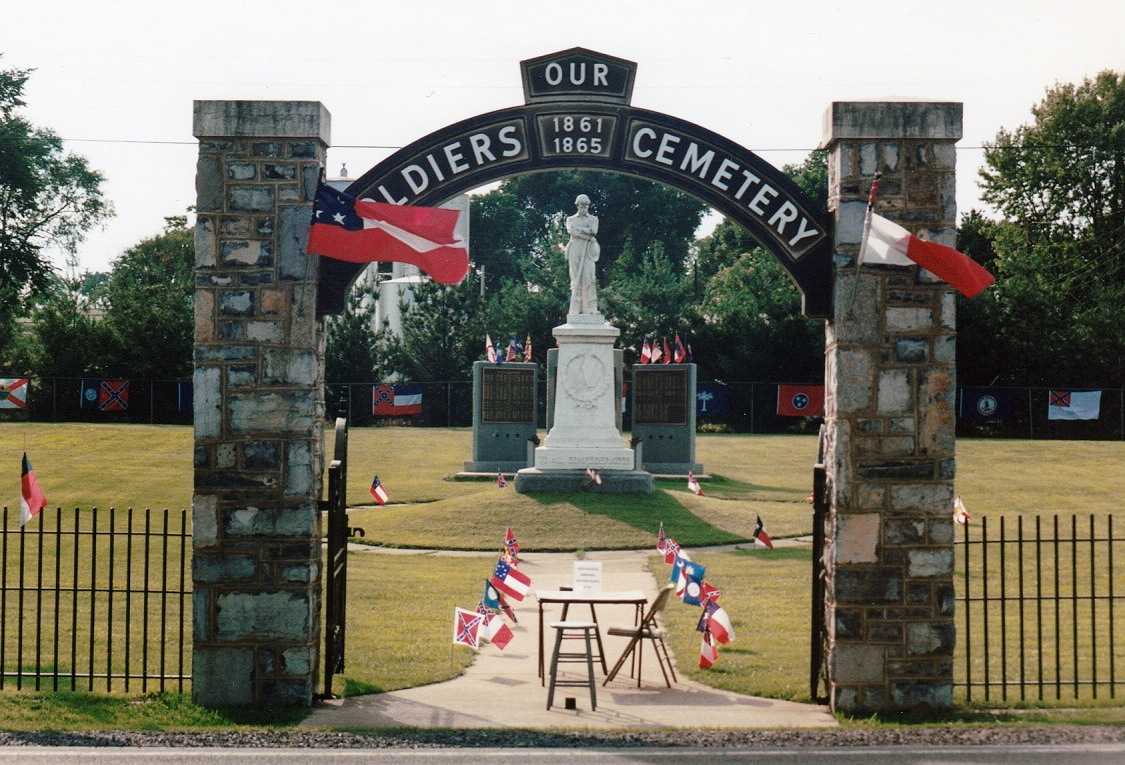
Mount Jackson

- Mount Jackson: "Our Soldiers Cemetery" statue (1903)
- New Kent: Confederate Monument (1934)
- New Market: This Rustic Pile Monument (1909)
- Newport News: Confederate Soldier Monument (1909)
- Nickelsville: Nickelsville Spartan Band Monument (2000)

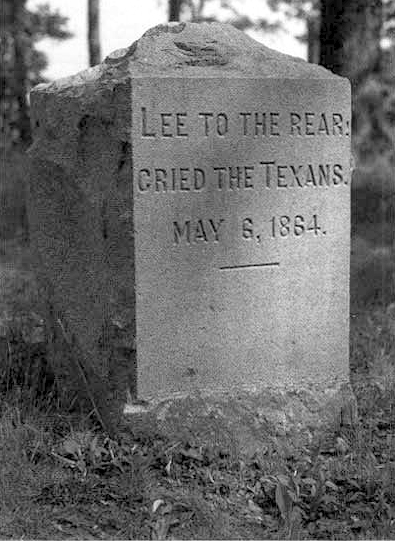
Lee to the Rear!, Wilderness Battlefield, Orange County, Virginia

- Orange County: Confederate monuments at Wilderness Battlefield include:
  - Wilderness Battlefield Tablet (1927), UDC monument
  - Colonel James D. Nance Tablet (1912), marks where Nance was killed
  - Texas Brigade Shaft (1964), "'Who are you my boys?' Lee cried as he saw them gathering. 'Texas boys,' they yelled, their number multiplying each second."
  - "Lee to the Rear!" Tablet (1903), "Lee to the Rear! Cried the Texans. May 6, 1864"
- Parksley: Confederate Monument (1899). Inscriptions read: "They died for the principles upon which all true republics are founded"; "They fought for conscience sake [ sic ] and died for right"; "At the call of patriotism and duty, they encountered the perils of the field and were faithful even unto death." The front of the monument gives this information: "Erected by Harmanson-West Camp Confederate Volunteers in memory of their dead comrades from Accomack and Northampton Counties." The monument was made by Gaddess Brothers of Baltimore of Barre granite, and is about 30 feet tall.

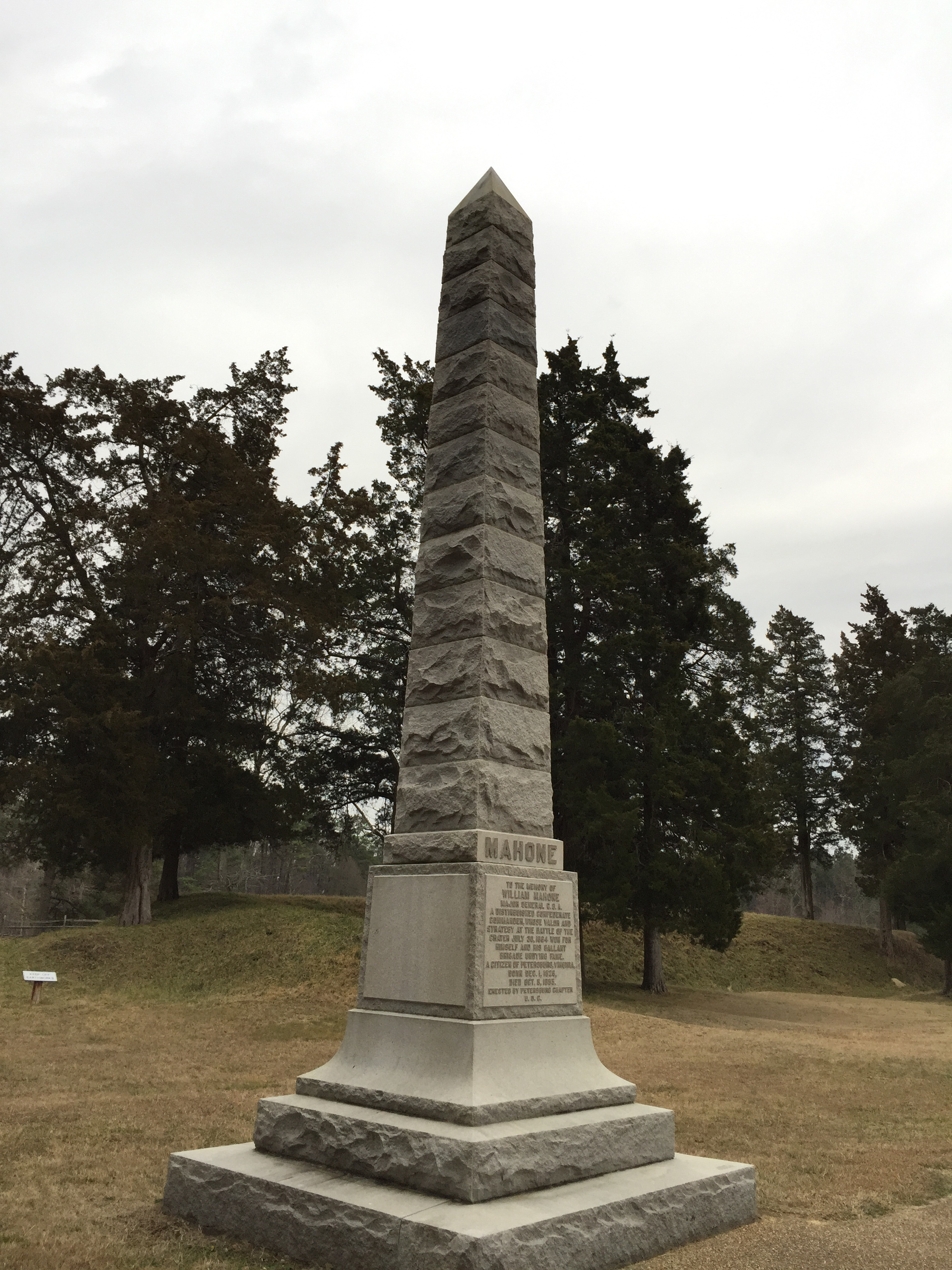
William Mahone Monument at Petersburg National Battlefield

- Petersburg:
  - Petersburg National Battlefield
  - Hagood's Brigade, a monument in the Petersburg National Battlefield. Text on front: "Here a brigade composed of the 7th battalion, the 11th, 21st, 25th and 27th regiments South Carolina Volunteers, commanded by Brig. Gen. Johnson Hagood, charged Warren's Federal Army Corps, on the 21st day of August 1864, taking into the fight 740 men, retiring with 273. // No prouder fate than theirs who gave their lives to liberty." Text on rear: "Placed here by Wm. V. Izlar, a survivor of the charge, aided by other South Carolinians."
  - Old Men and Boys Monument (1909), in Petersburg National Battlefield. Text: "This stone marks the spot where the old men and boys of Petersburg under Gen. R.E. Colston and Col. F.H. Archer 125 strong on June 9th, 1864 distinguished themselves in a fight with 1,300 Federal Cavalry under Gen. Kautz, gaining time for the defeat of the expedition. // Placed by the Petersburg Chapter U.D.C. May 1909"
  - Mahone Monument, Battle of the Crater, Petersburg National Battlefield (1927), erected by the United Daughters of the Confederacy
  - Monument where A. P. Hill was killed during the Third Battle of Petersburg
  - Monument where John Pegram was killed during the Battle of Hatcher's Run
- Pulaski: In Memory of the Confederate Soldiers of Pulaski County, 1861–1865 Monument (1906)
- Reams: North Carolina Monument

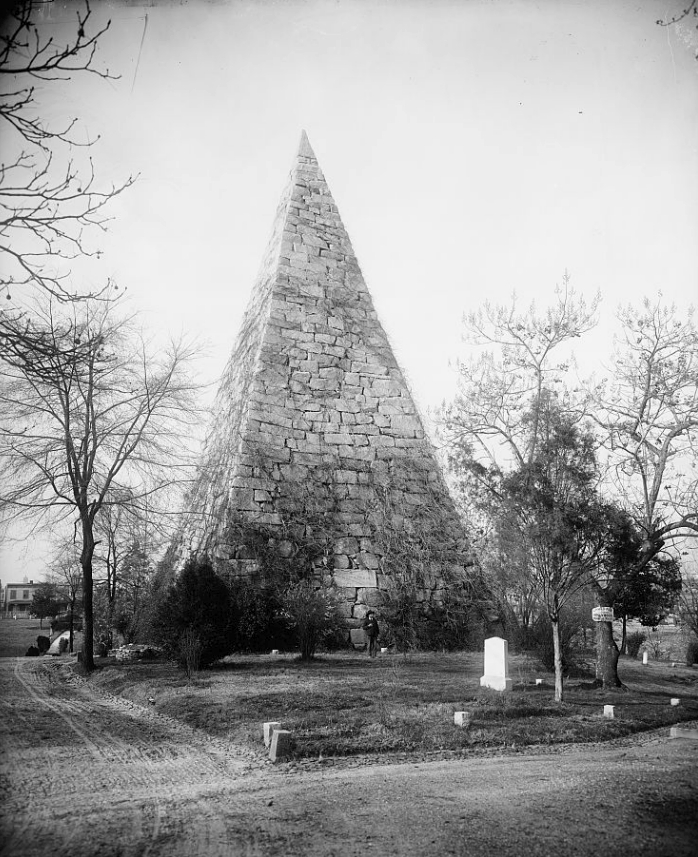
Memorial Granite Pile, Hollywood Cemetery, Richmond, Virginia. Photo by William Henry Jackson.

- Richmond:
  - Confederate Soldiers and Sailors Monument, Libby Hill Park (1894). Defaced with graffiti in 2015.
  - Hunter Holmes McGuire statue, on Capitol Square. McGuire was a Confederate veteran, Stonewall Jackson's personal physician, and an influential supporter of the "Lost Cause" view of the Confederacy and the Civil War.
  - The Memorial Granite Pile, Confederate Section, Hollywood Cemetery
- Stephenson: Memorial to Lieutenant Colonel Richard Snowden Andrews and Men of 1st Maryland Battery, CSA (1920)
- Strasburg: Confederate Monument (1896), Strasburg Presbyterian Church Cemetery

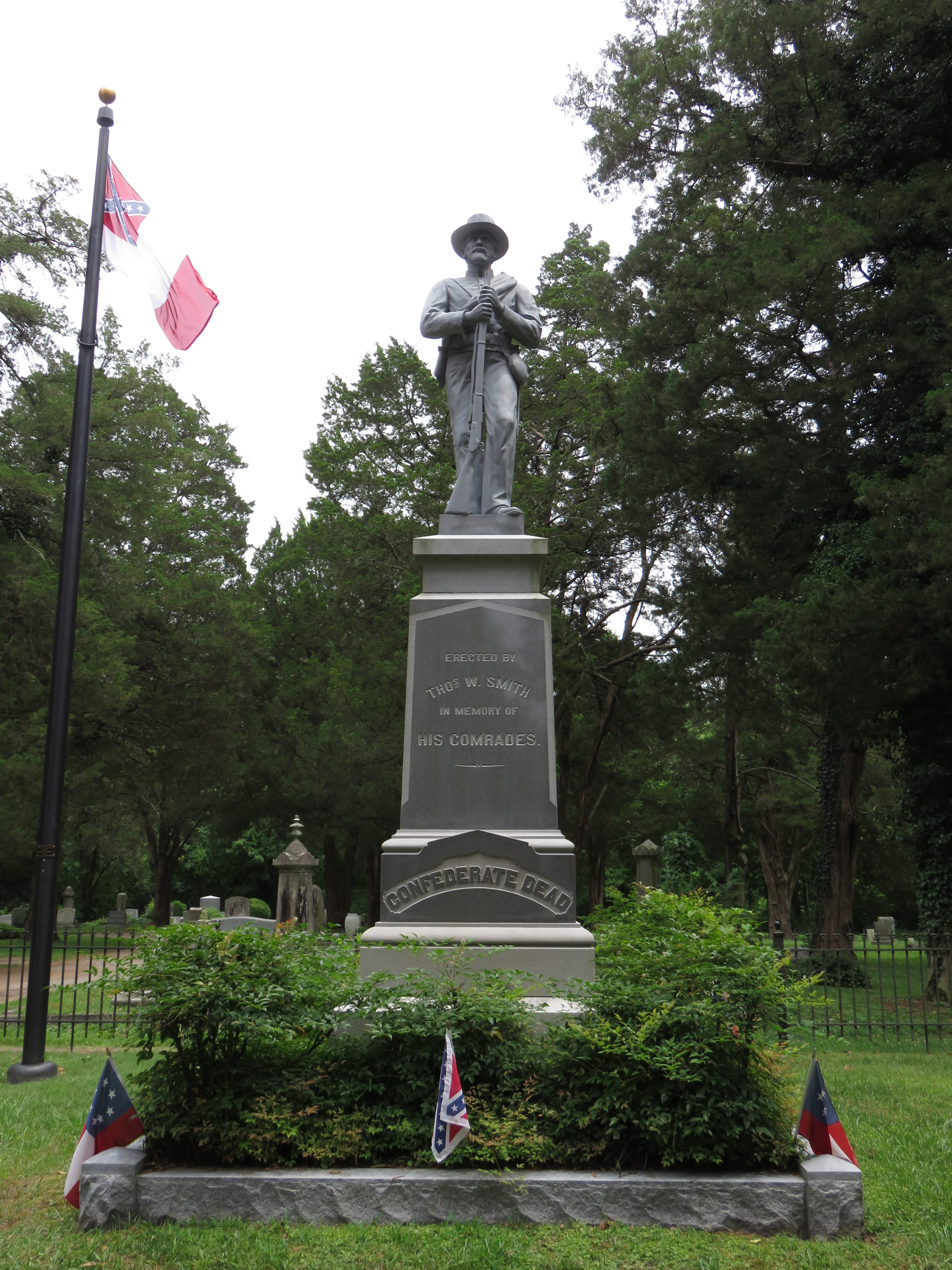
Cedar Hill Cemetery, Suffolk, Virginia

- Suffolk: Confederate Monument (1889), Cedar Hill Cemetery
- Virginia Beach: Princess Anne County Confederate Heroes Monument (1905)

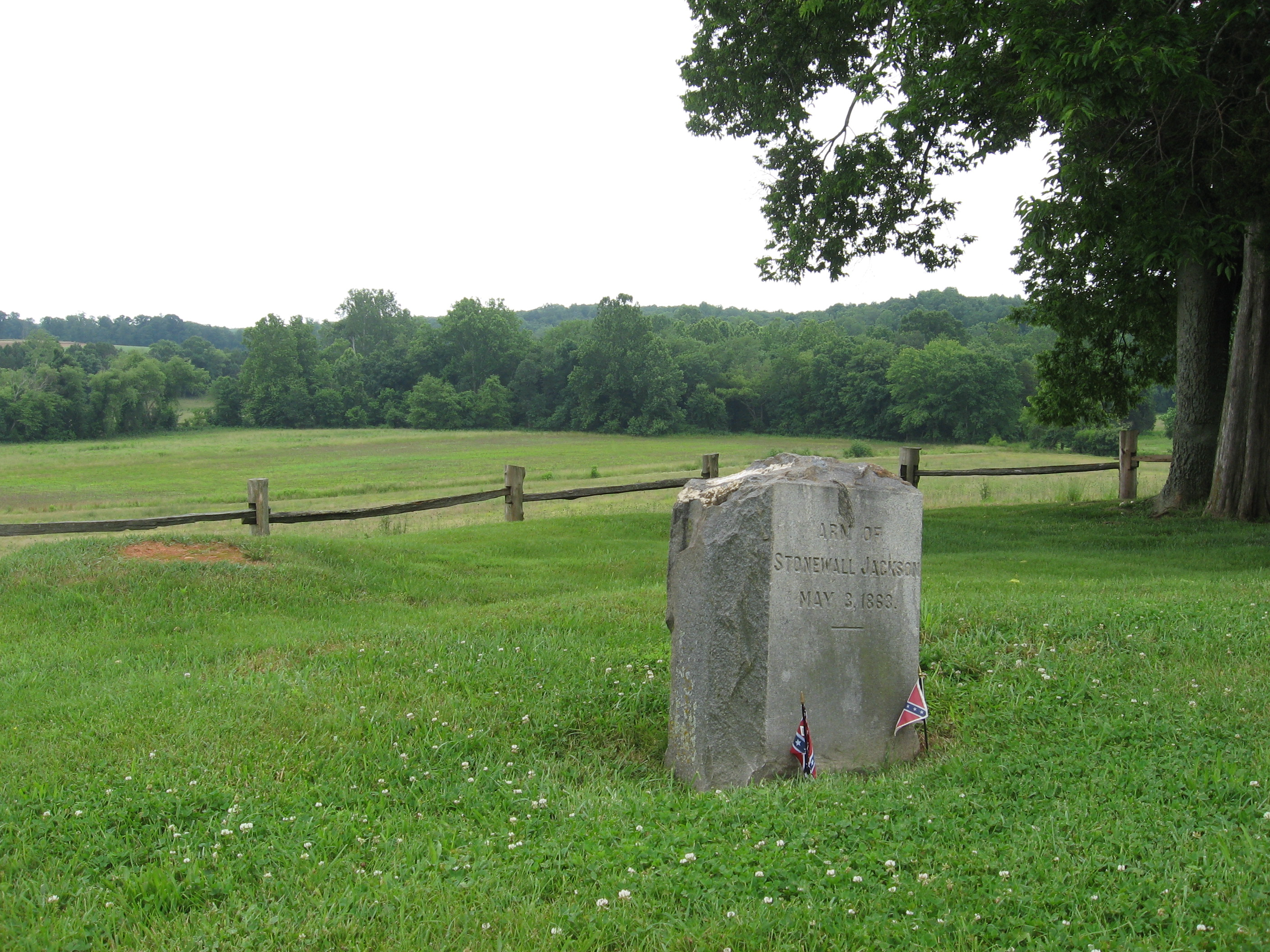
Monument near where Stonewall Jackson's arm was buried, Wilderness, Virginia

- Wilderness: Monument (1903) near where Stonewall Jackson's amputated arm was buried
- Williamsburg: Confederate Monument off Penniman Road named for John B. Magruder
- Winchester: Stonewall Confederate Cemetery, now a section of Mount Hebron Cemetery. Plaque: "Stonewall Cemetery / 3000 Confederate soldiers rest here. / Dedicated 1866."
  - Monument to the Unknown and Unrecorded Dead. Front: "Erected A.D. 1879, by the people of the South / To the 829 unknown Confederate Dead / who lie beneath this mound / in grateful remembrance of their Heroic Virtues / And that their example of unstinted devotion / to Duty and Country may never be forgotten." Left side: "Who they were, none know; / What they are, all know." Rear: "On fame’s eternal camping ground / Their silent tents are spread; / While glory guards with solemn round / This bivouac of the dead."
  - In honor of the women of Winchester, 1999
  - Alabama memorial
  - Arkansas monument, 2011
  - Florida memorial
  - Georgia memorial
  - Louisiana memorial
  - Mississippi plaque, 1998

== Private monuments ==
- Blairs: A 51 by 31 feet Confederate flag, near U.S. 29, was according to its erectors the largest one in existence (as of 2017).
- Franklin County: Jubal A. Early House, the General's boyhood home. Owned by the Jubal A. Early Preservation Trust.

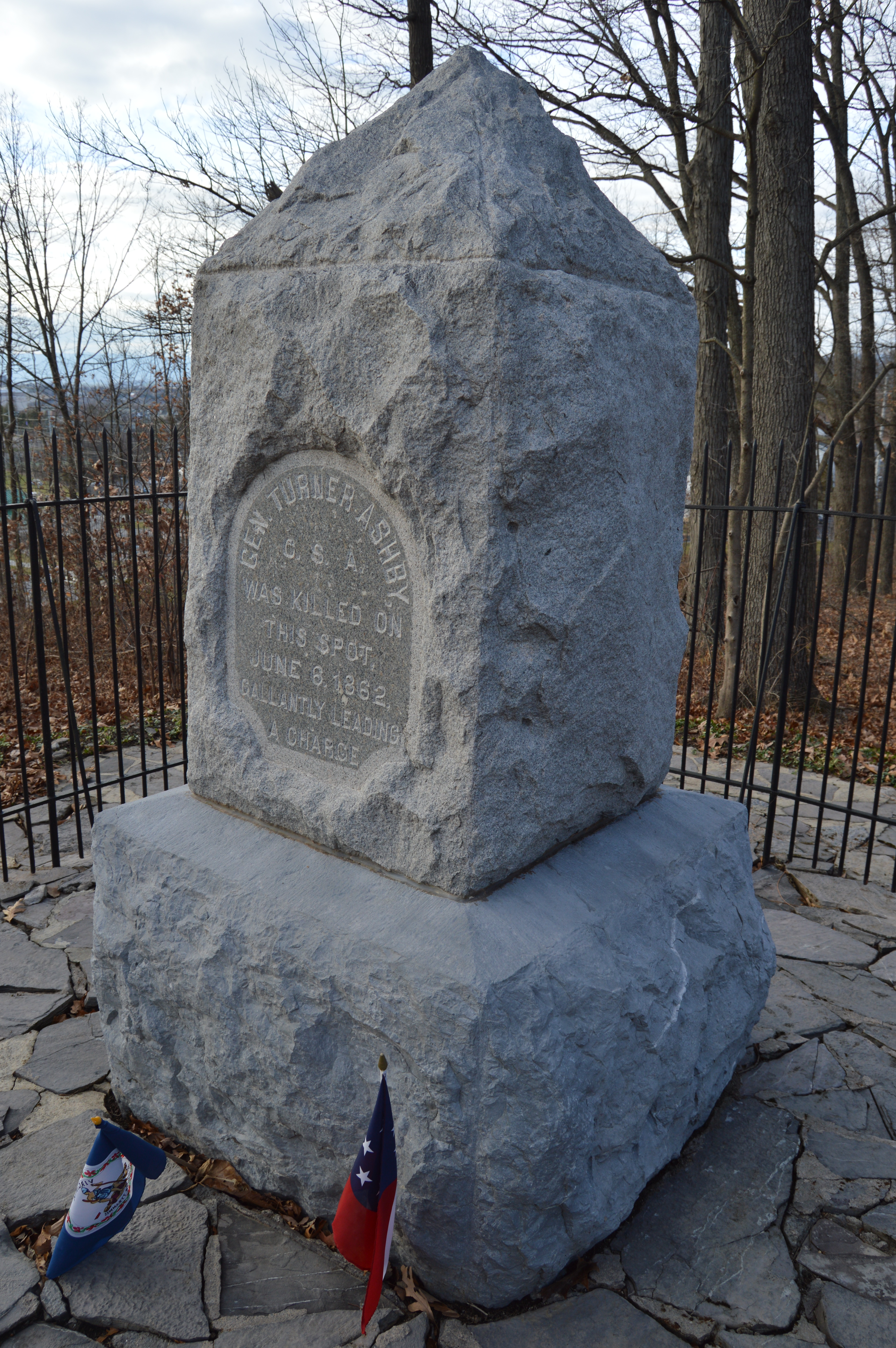
Turner Ashby Monument, Harrisonburg

- Harrisonburg: Turner Ashby Monument (1898), located on Turner Ashby Lane. In 2019, the monument was vandalized "when someone threw eggs, raw meat, and other substances on it." In February, 2020, it was vandalized with red paint.
- Petersburg: The former Blandford Church was turned by the Ladies Memorial Association of Petersburg into a Confederate memorial, or as the city's Web site puts it, "a shrine to its 'Lost Cause.'"
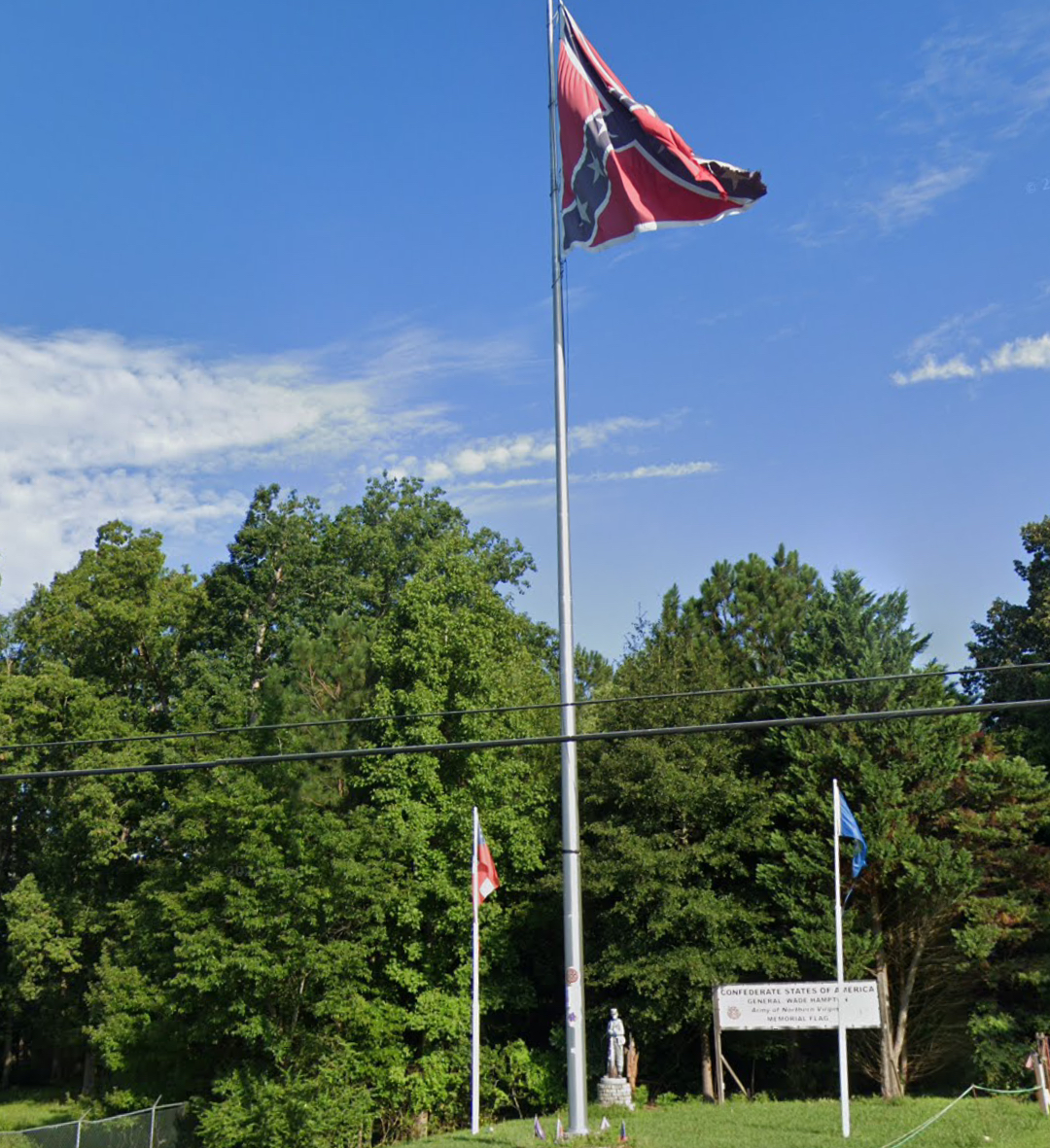
- The Confederate Memorial in Templeton, Virginia
  Templeton: Army of Northern Virginia Memorial Flag located off of I-95 and Highway 301 Is a large Confederate Battle Flag put up by the VA Flaggers accompanied by a Stars and Bars flag and a South Carolina State Flag also on the monument is a sign that says “CONFEDERATE STATES OF AMERICA. GENERAL WADE HAMPTON. Army of Northern Virginia. Memorial Flag.

== Parks and sites ==
- Fredericksburg: Lee Hill Community Center
- Roanoke: In June 2020, the Roanoke City Council voted to start the legal process to rename Lee Plaza after the July 1, 2020, date when a new state law removed the prohibition against removing monuments to the Confederate States of America. -now Freedom Plaza.

== Roads ==
- Alexandria:
  - Beauregard Street
  - Bragg Street
  - Braxton Place
  - Breckinridge Place
  - Chambliss Street
  - Dearing Street
  - Donelson Street
  - Early Street
  - Floyd Street
  - French Street
  - Frost Street
  - Gordon Street
  - Hardee Place
  - Hume Avenue
  - Imboden Street
  - Iverson Street
  - Jackson Place
  - Janney's Lane
  - Jordan Street
  - Jubal Avenue
  - Lee Street
  - Longstreet Lane
  - Maury Lane
  - Pegram Street
  - Quantrell Avenue
  - Reynolds Street
  - Rosser Street
  - Van Dorn Street
  - Wheeler Avenue
- Annandale:
  - John Marr Drive
  - Lanier Street
  - Rebel Drive
- Blackstone: Jeb Stuart Road
- Bland: Jeb Stuart Street
- Boones Mill: Jubal Early Highway
- Bristow: Robert E. Lee Drive
- Centreville:
  - Confederate Ridge Lane
  - General Lee Drive
- Chantilly:
  - Mosby Highway
  - Old Lee Road
- Culpeper:
  - General A.P. Hill
  - General Jackson Avenue
  - General Jeb Stuart Lane
  - General Lee Avenue
  - General Longstreet Avenue
  - General Winder Road
- Damascus: Jeb Stuart Highway
- Fairfax (all renamed effective Jan 1, 2023):
  - Confederate Lane
  - Mosby Woods Drive
  - Old Lee Highway
  - Pickett Road
- Forest: Jubal Early Drive
- Foster: Robert E. Lee Drive
- Fredericksburg: Jubal Early Drive
- Hardy: Jubal Early Highway
- Hopewell: Robert E. Lee Drive
- Ivor: General Mahone Boulevard
- Lynchburg: Early Street
- Manassas:
  - Beauregard Avenue
  - Lee Avenue
- Martinsville:
  - Jeb Stuart Road
  - Jefferson Davis Drive
- Mechanicsville: Lee Davis Road
- Middleburg: John Mosby Highway
- Natural Bridge Station:
  - Jeb Stuart Drive
  - Robert E. Lee Drive
- New Market:
  - Confederate Street
  - Lee Street
  - Stonewall Street
  - Stuart Street
- Petersburg:
  - Confederate Avenue
  - Jubal Early Drive
- Powhatan: Robert E. Lee Road
- Purcellville: Jeb Stuart Road
- Rhoadesville: Jeb Stuart Drive
- Richmond:
  - Confederate Avenue
  - Monument Avenue
  - Mosby Court
- Sandston:
  - Carter Avenue
  - Confederate Avenue
  - Early Avenue
  - Garland Avenue
  - J.B. Finley Avenue
  - Jackson Avenue
  - Kemper Court
  - Pickett Avenue
  - Wilson Way
- Staunton:
  - Beauregard Drive
  - J.E.B. Stuart Drive
  - Stonewall Jackson Boulevard
- Verona: Confederate Street
- Virginia Beach:
  - General Beauregard Drive
  - General Hill Drive
  - General Jackson Drive
  - General Lee Drive
  - General Longstreet Drive
  - Hood Drive
- Warrenton:
  - Forrest Court
  - Forrest Road
  - Stuart Circle
- Waynesboro:
  - Davis Road
  - Pickett Road
  - Robert E. Lee Avenue
- Winchester: Jubal Early Drive
- Woodford:
  - Jeff Davis Drive
  - Stonewall Jackson Road
- Wirtz: Jubal Early Highway

== Schools ==
- Bridgewater: Turner Ashby High School, named for CSA colonel Turner Ashby, the "Black Knight of the Confederacy". The school's football team are the "Black Knights".
- Bristol:
  - Stonewall Jackson Elementary School (1948)
  - Washington-Lee Elementary School (1968)
- Fairfax:
  - Lees Corner Elementary, named for Lee family (including Robert E. Lee) as owners of Sully Plantation (1986)
- Fredericksburg: Lee Hill Elementary School (1952)
- Henrico: Douglas S. Freeman High School. Its athletic teams are nicknamed the "Rebels." The school has retired its "Rebel man" mascot.
- Hurley: Hurley High School. Its athletic teams are nicknamed the "Rebels." Confederate iconography, including the Confederate Battle Flag, is prominent throughout the school.
- Lexington: Washington and Lee University. See above, under "Other public monuments".
- Manassas: Stonewall Jackson High School (renamed Unity Reed High School in 2020)
- Mathews Lee-Jackson Elementary School
- Spotsylvania Courthouse:
  - 'Lee's Headquarters' monument (1903)
  - Ramseur's Brigade monument (2001)
- Springfield:
  - Sangster Elementary named for a prominent slaveholding family loyal to the Confederacy
- Stuart: Stuart Elementary School (1938)

== Former or removed monument and memorials ==
For a list of removed or renamed memorials, see Removal of Confederate monuments and memorials#Virginia.

== See also ==
- Virginia in the American Civil War
- List of Confederate monuments and memorials
- List of memorials and monuments at Arlington National Cemetery
- Removal of Confederate monuments and memorials#Virginia
