= North Shore, Virginia =

- Census-designated place
- Location within Virginia Location within the United States
- Coordinates: 37°4′47″N 79°39′41″W
- Country: United States
- State: Virginia
- County: Franklin

Area
  - Total: 20.1 sq mi (52.1 km^{2})
  - Land: 13.7 sq mi (35.4 km^{2})
  - Water: 6.4 sq mi (16.7 km^{2})
- Elevation: 1,004 ft (306 m)

Population (2020)
  - Total: 3,332
  - Density: 244/sq mi (94.1/km^{2})
- Time zone: UTC−5 (Eastern (EST))
  - Summer (DST): UTC−4 (EDT)
- ZIP Code: 24121 (Moneta); 24184 (Wirtz)
- Area codes: 540 and 826
- FIPS code: 51-57531
- GNIS feature ID: 1852917

North Shore is a census-designated place (CDP) in Franklin County, Virginia, United States. As of the 2020 census, North Shore had a population of 3,332. The community lies along State Route 616. It is part of the Roanoke metropolitan area.

Westlake Corner borders the community to the north and northwest.

== Geography ==
North Shore is located in northeastern Franklin County at 37°5′30″N 79°39′4″W (37.091605, −79.651248). It occupies a 6-mile-long (10 km) peninsula in Smith Mountain Lake, an impoundment on the Roanoke River. The northeast edge of the CDP follows the Roanoke River arm of the lake, which is also the Bedford County line, while the southern and southwestern edge follows the Blackwater River and Gills Creek arm. It is bordered to the north by the Westlake Corner CDP, with the border formed by Patience Lane, Gilford Road, Scruggs Road, and Lakewood Forest Road. The unincorporated community of Scruggs is in the center of the North Shore CDP.

According to the United States Census Bureau, the North Shore CDP has a total area of 20.1 square miles (52.1 km^{2}), of which 13.7 square miles (35.4 km^{2}) is land and 6.4 square miles (16.7 km^{2}), or 32.05%, is water.

== Demographics ==
Historical population
Census	Pop.	Note	%±
2000	2,112		—
2010	3,094		46.5%
2020	3,332		7.7%
U.S. Decennial Census; 2000 2010 2020

North Shore was first listed as a census designated place in the 2000 U.S. census.

=== 2020 census ===
As of the 2020 census, North Shore had a population of 3,332. The median age was 62.8 years. 9.8% of residents were under the age of 18 and 43.7% of residents were 65 years of age or older. For every 100 females there were 96.3 males, and for every 100 females age 18 and over there were 95.6 males age 18 and over.

0.0% of residents lived in urban areas, while 100.0% lived in rural areas.

There were 1,573 households in North Shore, of which 15.1% had children under the age of 18 living in them. Of all households, 68.6% were married-couple households, 10.2% were households with a male householder and no spouse or partner present, and 17.0% were households with a female householder and no spouse or partner present. About 19.2% of all households were made up of individuals and 11.9% had someone living alone who was 65 years of age or older.

There were 2,954 housing units, of which 46.8% were vacant. The homeowner vacancy rate was 2.4% and the rental vacancy rate was 13.8%.

Racial composition as of the 2020 census
Race	Number	Percent
White	3,166	95.0%
Black or African American	19	0.6%
American Indian and Alaska Native	6	0.2%
Asian	14	0.4%
Native Hawaiian and Other Pacific Islander	0	0.0%
Some other race	12	0.4%
Two or more races	115	3.5%
Hispanic or Latino (of any race)	47	1.4%

=== 2010 census ===
As of the census of 2010, there were 3,094 people residing in the CDP. There were 2,950 housing units. The racial makeup of the CDP was 97.3% White, 1.3% African American, 0.5% Native American, 0.3% Asian, 0.0% Pacific Islander, 0.2% from other races, and 0.4% from two or more races. Hispanic or Latino of any race were 1.0% of the population.

=== 2000 census ===
As of the census of 2000, there were 2,112 people, 994 households, and 748 families residing in the CDP. The population density was 154.6 people per square mile (59.7/km^{2}). There were 1,919 housing units at an average density of 140.4/sq mi (54.2/km^{2}). The racial makeup of the CDP was 98.11% White, 1.33% African American, 0.05% Native American, 0.09% Asian, 0.09% from other races, and 0.33% from two or more races. Hispanic or Latino of any race were 0.80% of the population.

There were 994 households, out of which 15.1% had children under the age of 18 living with them, 70.0% were married couples living together, 4.0% had a female householder with no husband present, and 24.7% were non-families. 21.2% of all households were made up of individuals, and 8.6% had someone living alone who was 65 years of age or older. The average household size was 2.12 and the average family size was 2.44.

In the CDP, the population was spread out, with 12.2% under the age of 18, 3.5% from 18 to 24, 18.4% from 25 to 44, 42.5% from 45 to 64, and 23.5% who were 65 years of age or older. The median age was 54 years. For every 100 females there were 99.6 males. For every 100 females age 18 and over, there were 98.8 males.

The median income for a household in the CDP was $55,288, and the median income for a family was $62,546. Males had a median income of $34,323 versus $24,612 for females. The per capita income for the CDP was $34,028. About 1.3% of families and 1.6% of the population were below the poverty line, including none of those under the age of eighteen or sixty-five or over.

== Parks and recreation ==
Smith Mountain Lake Community Park, a public park maintained by the Franklin County Parks and Recreation Department is located within the CDP. The 37-acre park opened in June 2007 and includes walking trails, a fishing pier, playground, and community beach.

Crazy Horse Marina as well as the Virginia Department of Wildlife Resources operated Scruggs #8 offer public boating access sites to Smith Mountain Lake in North Shore.

The Waterfront Country Club, a country club is located within the CDP.

== Government ==
The United States Postal Service does not operate a post office within the CDP. Addresses within North Shore use a Moneta or Wirtz ZIP Code.

== Education ==
The community is served by Franklin County Public Schools. Public school students residing in North Shore are zoned to attend Dudley Elementary School, Benjamin Franklin Middle School, Franklin County High School.

The closest higher education institutions are located in Ferrum and Roanoke.

== Infrastructure ==
=== Public safety ===
Law enforcement is provided by the Franklin County Sheriff's Office. Fire protection and emergency medical services are provided by the Scruggs Volunteer Fire Department and Rescue Squad, which operates a fire station within the CDP.

== Transportation ==
=== Air ===
Smith Mountain Lake Airport is the closest general aviation airport to the CDP. The Roanoke-Blacksburg Regional Airport is the closest airport with commercial service to the CDP.

=== Highways ===
- Virginia State Route 616 (Scruggs Road)

=== Rail ===
No rail lines are located within the CDP. The closest passenger rail service is located in Roanoke.
