= Maggodee Creek =

River in the Virginia, United States

Coordinates: 37.052363°N 79.826976°W

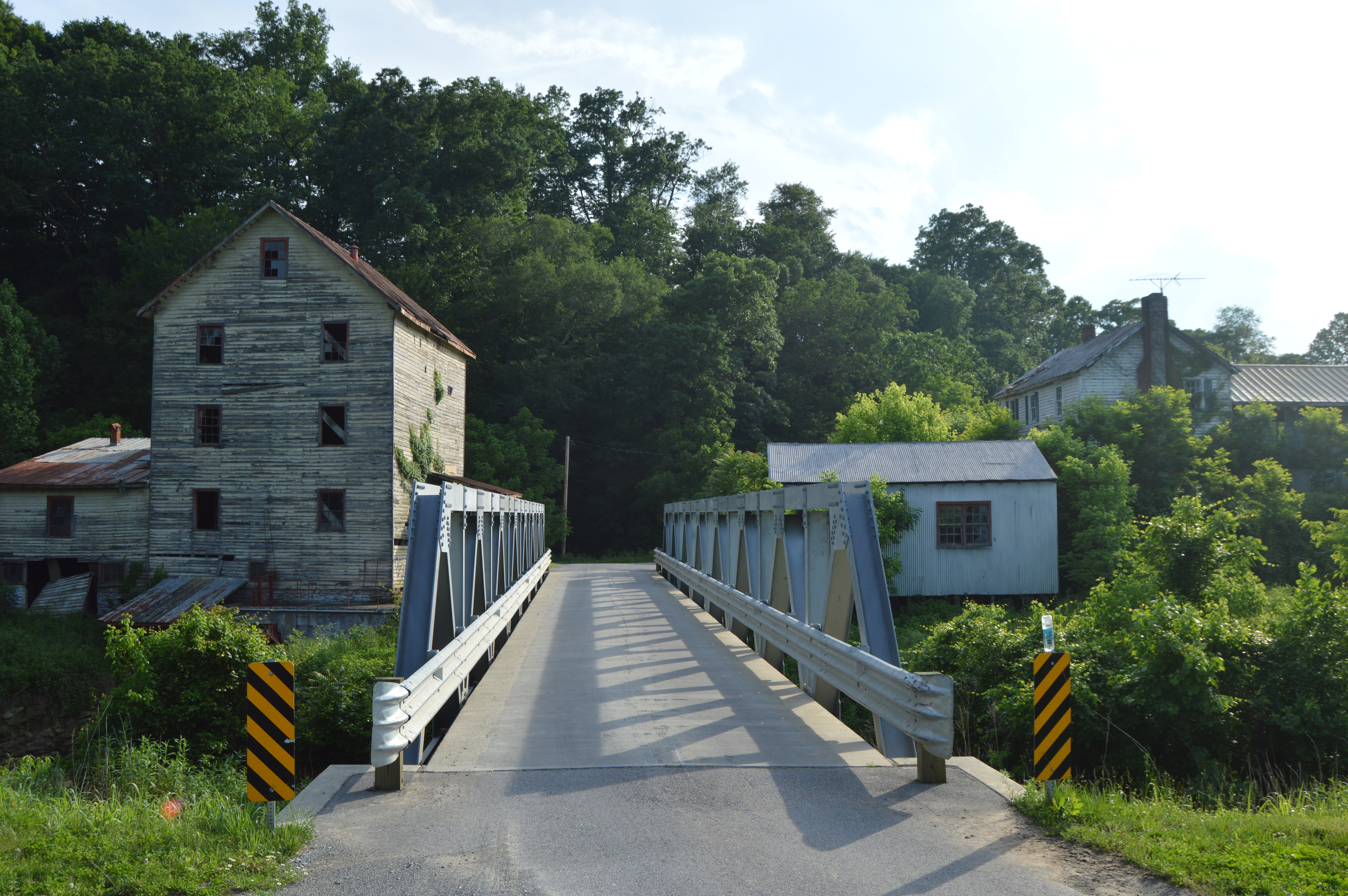
- Alean Road's crossing of Maggodee Creek

Location
- Country: United States

Physical characteristics
- Source
  - location: Virginia

Maggodee Creek is a creek in Franklin County in the United States state of Virginia. The creek is a southeast-flowing tributary of the Blackwater River, part of the Roanoke River watershed.

The creek is located in the Blue Ridge, Piedmont, and Appalachian mountains. The town of Boones Mill, Virginia is located in the valley of the creek. Historically, alternate names for this stream have included "Maggodi Creek" and "Maggotty Creek."

In his autobiography Against the Tide, the African American pastor and activist Adam Clayton Powell Sr. said he "was born near Martin's Mill at the conflux of Maggotty and Soak Creeks, Franklin County, Virginia."

The Piedmont Mill Historic District, is located along the creek. The water-powered Martin-Piedmont-Clements mill (built in the 1860s) was built on Maggodee Creek, which helped the rural industry to flourish in Southside Virginia. In 1929, the Virginia State Highway Commission built a single lane truss bridge over the creek.

== See also ==
- List of rivers of Virginia
