= Otter Creek Archaeological Site =

The Otter Creek Archaeological Site may refer to the following sites:

- Otter Creek Archaeological Site (Ferrum, Virginia), listed on the National Register of Historic Places
- Otter Creek Archaeological Site (Keota, Oklahoma), listed on the National Register of Historic Places
