= Hale's Ford, Virginia =

Unincorporated community in Virginia, United States

- Unincorporated community
- Location within Virginia Location within the United States
- Coordinates: 37°07′37″N 79°41′58″W
- Country: United States
- State: Virginia
- County: Franklin
- Elevation: 991 ft (302 m)
- Time zone: UTC−5 (Eastern (EST))
  - Summer (DST): UTC−4 (EDT)
- Area code: 540
- GNIS feature ID: 1494796

Hale's Ford is a small unincorporated community located in the northeastern corner of Franklin County, Virginia, United States, approximately 25 miles (40 km) from Roanoke. It is most notable as the location of the Burroughs Farm, the tobacco plantation where the famed educator and orator Booker T. Washington was born into slavery in 1856. His mother Jane was an enslaved black woman held by the Burroughs and his father was a white planter who lived nearby. After the Civil War ended, Jane took her children to West Virginia to rejoin her husband, who had been sold there as a slave before the war.

The Booker T. Washington National Monument, established in 1956, preserves portions of the 207-acre (84 ha) tobacco plantation where Washington was born. It interprets his life as a national leader.

Hale's Ford is also the site of one of Virginia's historic covered bridges and of the Hook–Powell–Moorman Farm, which is on the National Register of Historic Places.

Some of the community is included within the Westlake Corner census-designated place.
