= Piedmont Mill Historic District =

Historic district in Virginia, United States

- U.S. National Register of Historic Places
- U.S. Historic district
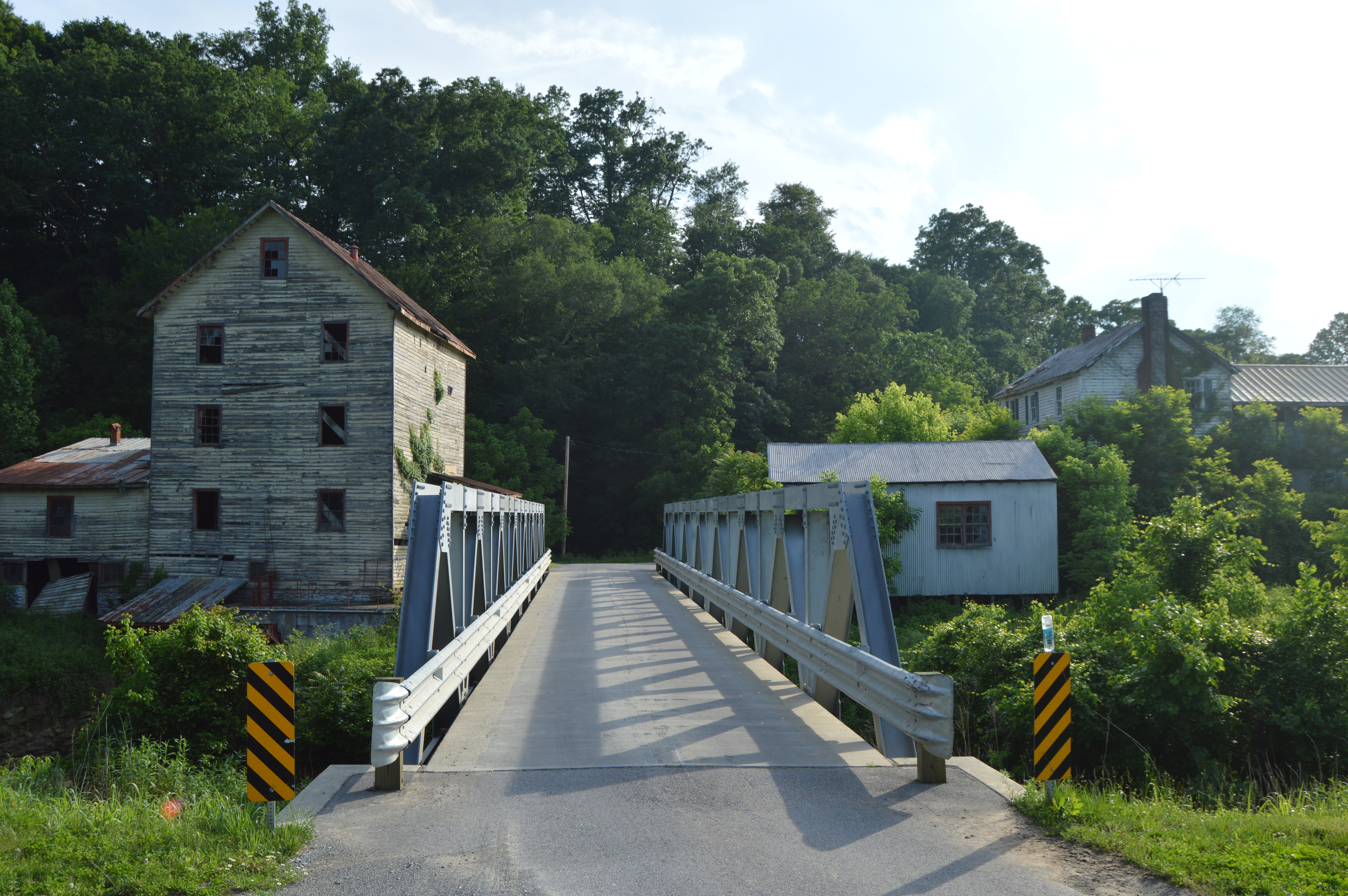

- Location within Virginia Location within the United States
- Nearest city: 1709 Alean Rd., rural Franklin County, Virginia
- Coordinates: 37°5′44″N 79°51′18″W
- Area: 5.1 acres (2.1 ha)
- Built: 1866
- Architectural style: I house, gable end house
- NRHP reference No.: 09000063
- Added to NRHP: February 27, 2009

The Piedmont Mill Historic District encompasses a historic 19th-century grist mill complex at 1709 Alean Road in rural Franklin County, Virginia. Located between Wirtz and Burnt Chimney on the banks of Maggodee Creek, it includes an 1866 mill building, an earthen raceway and a 20th-century concrete dam, as well as a metal truss bridge. In 1870, it was the most powerful mill in the county, which it served under several owners until 1963.

The district was listed on the National Register of Historic Places in 2009.

== See also ==
- National Register of Historic Places listings in Franklin County, Virginia
