= Boones Mill station =

- Boones Mill Depot
- U.S. National Register of Historic Places
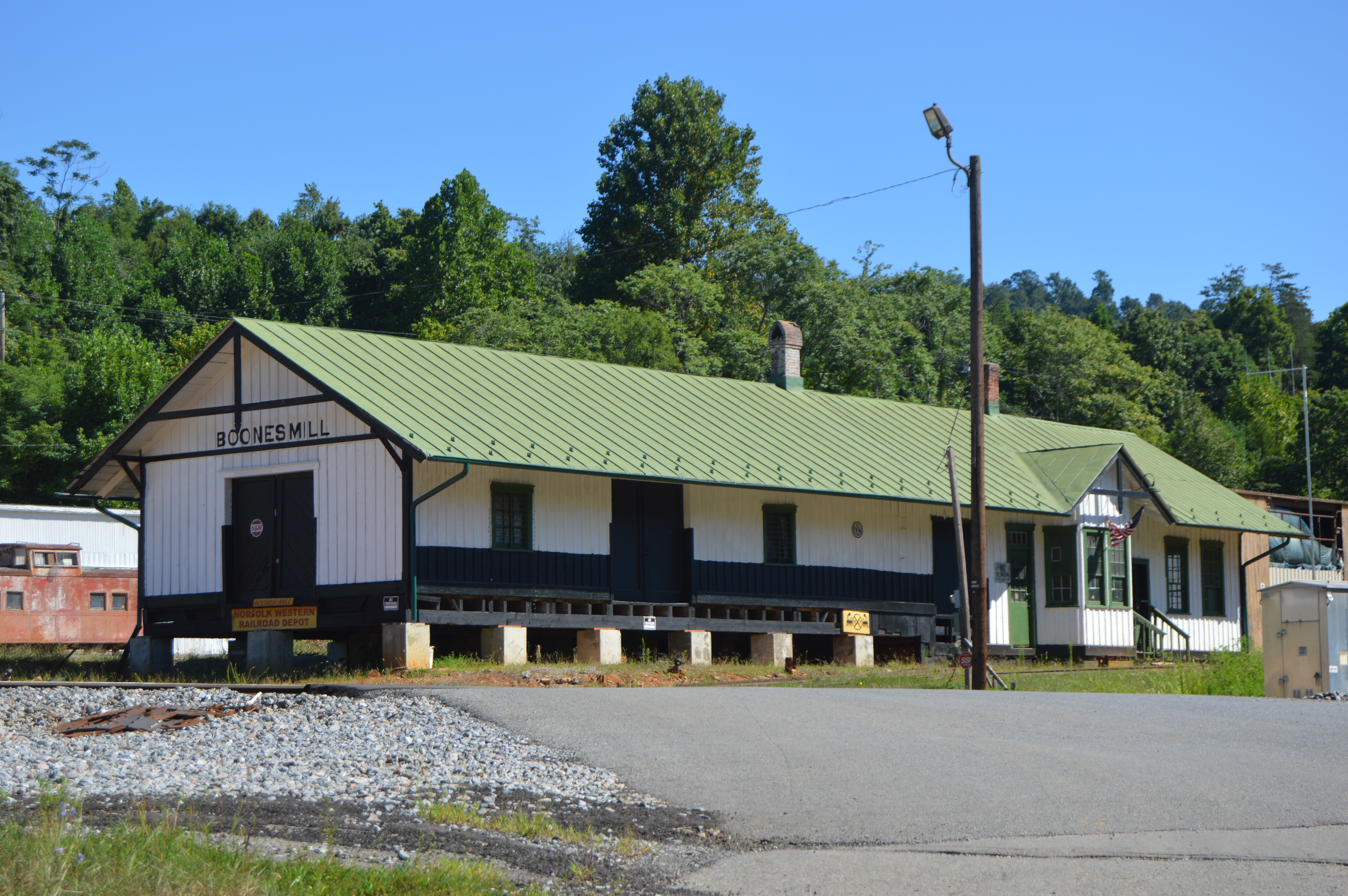

- Location within Virginia Location within the United States
- Location: Digby Greene Rd. and Depot Dr., Boones Mill, Virginia
- Area: less than one acre
- Built: 1892
- Architectural style: Railroad Style
- NRHP reference No.: 100001042
- Added to NRHP: June 5, 2017

The Boones Mill Depot is a historic railroad station building at Digby Greene Road and Depot Drive in Boones Mill, Virginia. It is a single-story wood-frame structure, covered with a gabled roof whose eaves extend well beyond the building. Its exterior is clad in vertical board-and-batten siding. The building is divided functionally into a freight depot and passenger area, with the station office in between. The office area includes a projecting bay on the track side of the building, topped by a small gable. The station was built in 1892 for the Norfolk and Western Railway, and was taken out of service in 1970. It was acquired by the town in 2014.

The depot was listed on the National Register of Historic Places in 2017.

== See also ==
- National Register of Historic Places listings in Franklin County, Virginia

Preceding station	Norfolk and Western Railway	Following station
Wirtz toward Winston-Salem	Winston-Salem – Roanoke	Roanoke Terminus
