= Boones Mill Historic District =

Historic district in Virginia, United States

- U.S. National Register of Historic Places
- U.S. Historic district
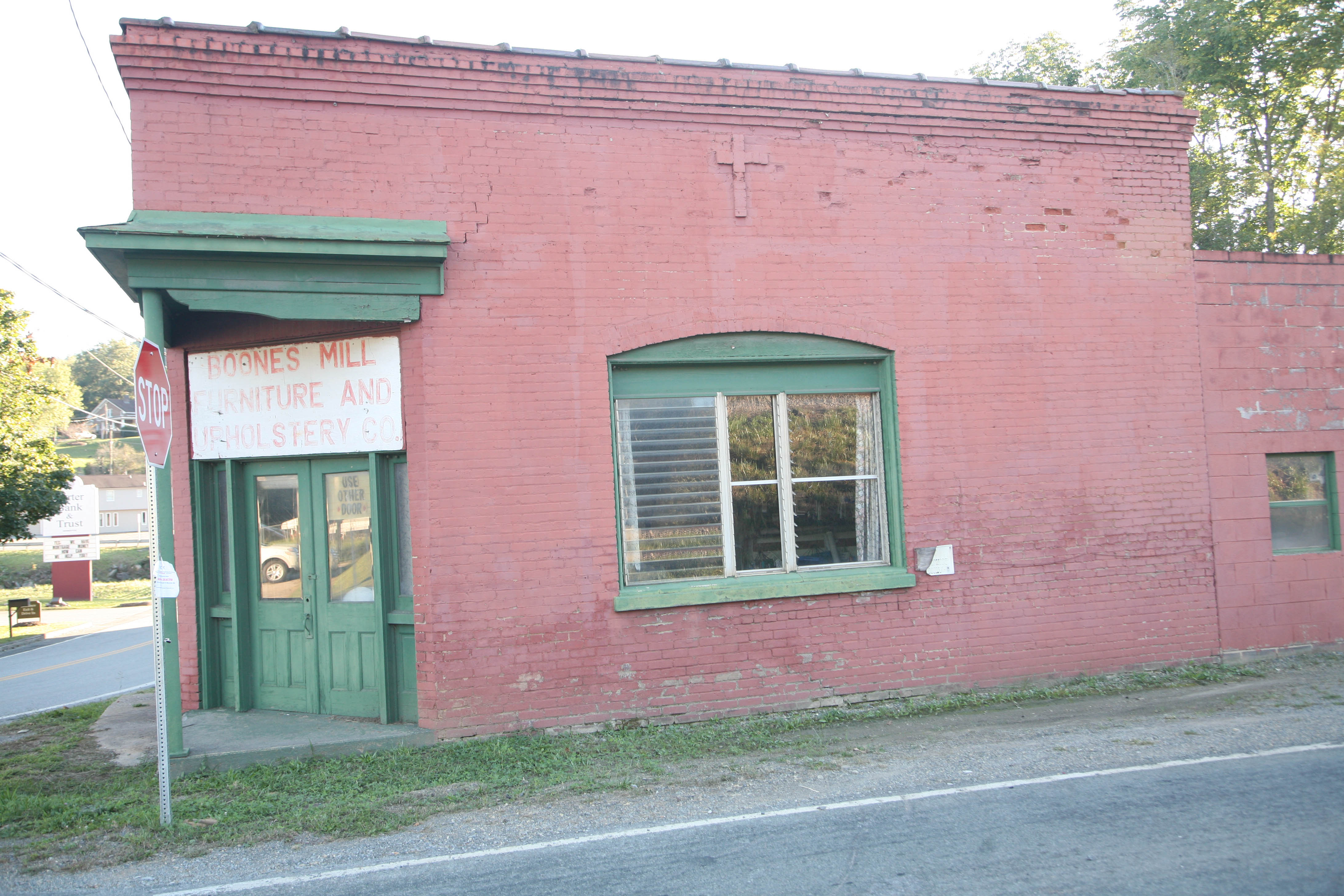
- Farmers and Merchants Bank

- Location within Virginia Location within the United States
- Location: U.S. Route 220, Maggodee Ln., Bethlehem, Dogwood Hill, and Boones Mill Rds., and Boon, Easy, and Church Hill Sts., Boones Mill, Virginia
- Coordinates: 37°6′54″N 79°57′14″W
- Area: 45.3 acres (18.3 ha)
- Built: 1782
- NRHP reference No.: 14000526
- Added to NRHP: August 25, 2014

The Boones Mill Historic District encompasses the historic center of the town of Boones Mill, Virginia, United States. The 45-acre (18 ha) district includes the town's commercial and civic heart, as well as a residential area lying adjacent. Included in the district is the 1780s Boon-Angell-Ferguson House, a log structure at 300 Easy Street which by local lore was built by Jacob Boon, who first settled the area. Other significant buildings include the 1912 Farmers and Merchants Bank at 75 Boones Mill Road, and the Boone Mill Supply Company building at 100 Easy Street.

The district was listed on the National Register of Historic Places in 2014.
