= Booth–Lovelace House =

Historic house in Virginia, United States

- U.S. National Register of Historic Places
- Virginia Landmarks Register
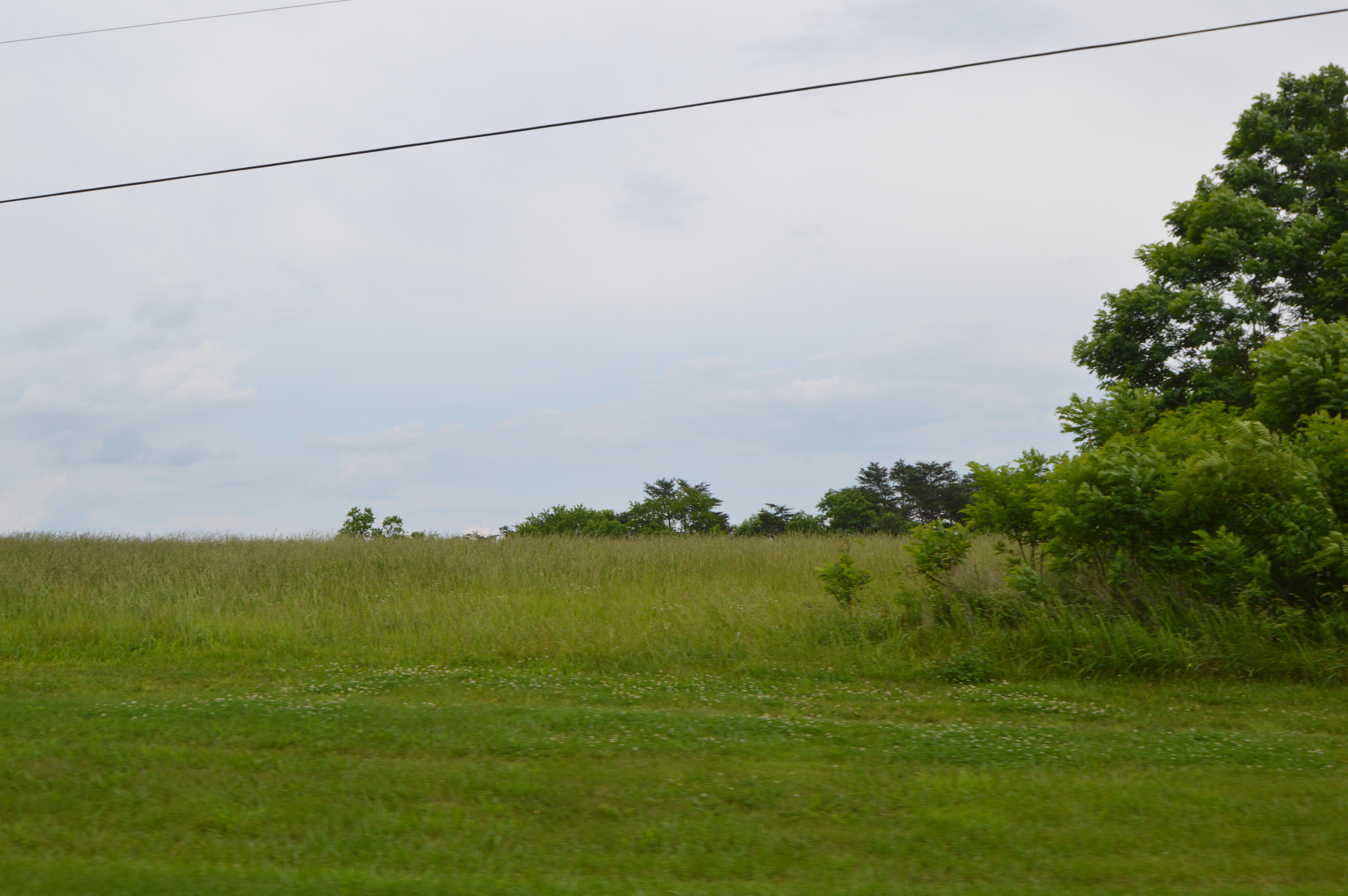
- Fields on the farm

- Location within Virginia Location within the United States
- Location: 130 Lovelace Ln., Hardy, Virginia
- Coordinates: 37°10′16″N 79°51′59″W
- Area: 67 acres (27 ha)
- Built: 1859
- Built by: Seth Richardson
- Architectural style: Greek Revival, Italianate
- NRHP reference No.: 02000996
- VLR No.: 033-0066

Significant dates
- Added to NRHP: September 14, 2002
- Designated VLR: June 12, 2002

Booth–Lovelace House, also known as the Overhome Bed and Breakfast, is a historic home located near Hardy, Franklin County, Virginia. It was built in approximately 1859 and is a large, two-story, frame dwelling with weatherboard siding. It has a metal-sheathed hip roof above a bracketed Italianate cornice and three Greek Revival one-story porches. Also on the property are a contributing office / dwelling, ash house, granary, barn, and spring. The house was converted to a bed and breakfast in the 1990s.

It was listed on the National Register of Historic Places in 2002.
