= Hook–Powell–Moorman Farm =

- U.S. National Register of Historic Places
- U.S. Historic district
- Virginia Landmarks Register
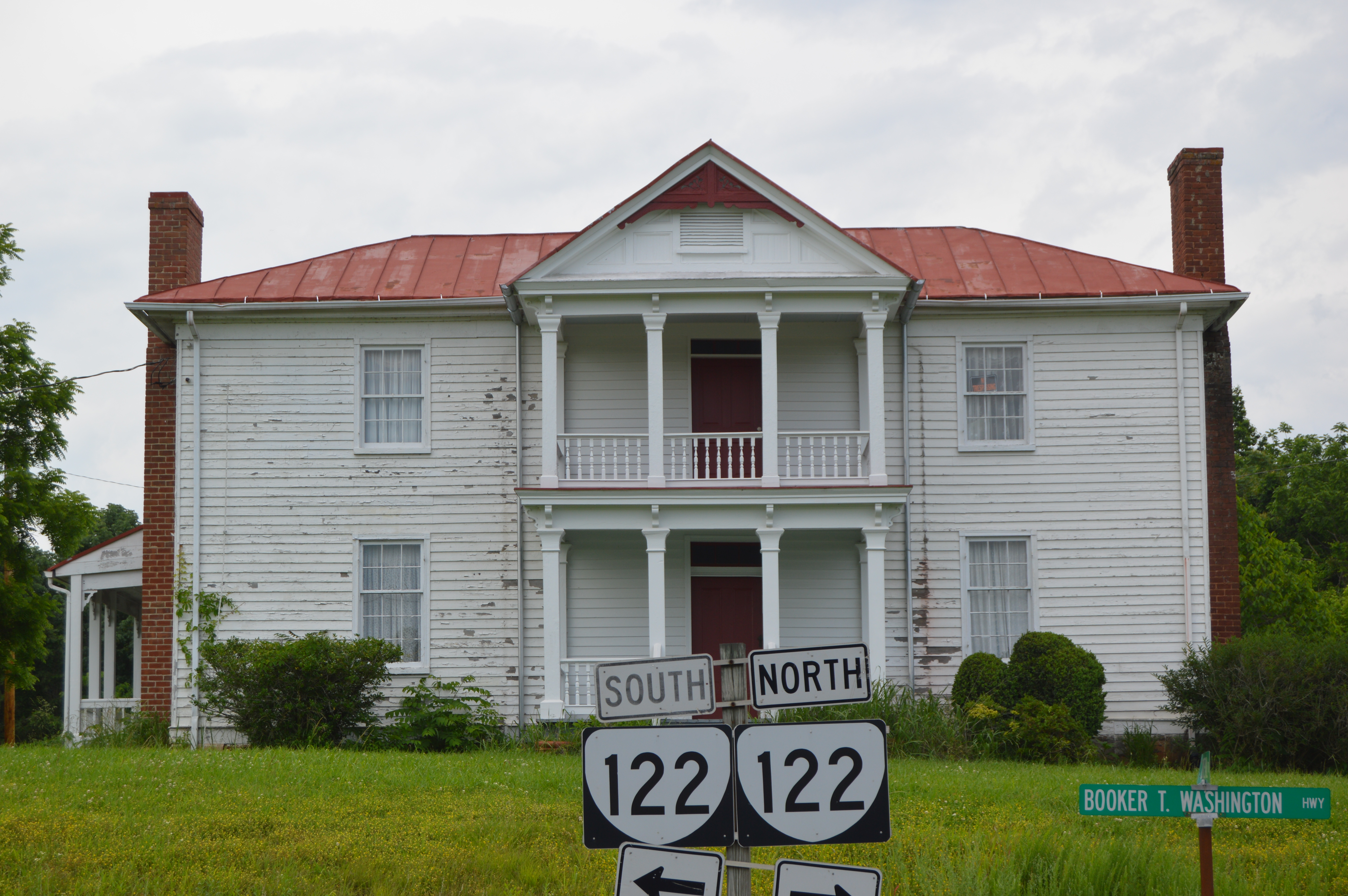
- Front of the house

- Location within Virginia Location within the United States
- Location: Jct. of VA 122 and VA 950, near Hales Ford, Virginia
- Coordinates: 37°8′23″N 79°40′48″W
- Area: 60 acres (24 ha)
- Built: 1784
- Architectural style: Georgian, Greek Revival
- NRHP reference No.: 95000893
- VLR No.: 033-0022

Significant dates
- Added to NRHP: July 21, 1995
- Designated VLR: April 28, 1995

Hook–Powell–Moorman Farm is a historic farm complex and national historic district located near Hales Ford, Franklin County, Virginia. It encompasses three contributing buildings and 10 contributing sites. The buildings are the Greek Revival-style farmhouse (c. 1855); a one-story frame building with Georgian detailing identified as the John Hook Store (c. 1784); and the Dr. John A. Moorman Office (c. 1890). The sites are those of an ice house, carriage house, workshop, barn, outbuilding, original site of the store, a house, spring, ice pond, and road bed.

It was listed on the National Register of Historic Places in 1995.
