= Westlake Corner, Virginia =

- Census-designated place
- Location within Virginia Location within the United States
- Coordinates: 37°7′59″N 79°40′44″W
- Country: United States
- State: Virginia
- County: Franklin

Area
  - Total: 11.5 sq mi (29.7 km^{2})
  - Land: 10.1 sq mi (26.1 km^{2})
  - Water: 1.4 sq mi (3.6 km^{2})
- Elevation: 938 ft (286 m)

Population (2020)
  - Total: 1,553
  - Density: 97/sq mi (37.4/km^{2})
- Time zone: UTC−5 (Eastern (EST))
  - Summer (DST): UTC−4 (EDT)
- FIPS code: 51-84632
- GNIS feature ID: 1852920

Westlake Corner is a census-designated place in Franklin County, Virginia, United States. The population was 1,553 at the 2020 census up from 976 at the 2010 census. It is part of the Roanoke metropolitan area.

== Geography ==
Westlake Corner is located in northeastern Franklin County at 37°7′59″N 79°40′44″W (37.133117, −79.678794), adjacent to Smith Mountain Lake. Its northeastern border is the Roanoke River arm of the lake, which forms the Bedford County line. It is bordered to the south by the North Shore CDP. Virginia State Route 122 passes through the CDP, leading southwest 17 miles (27 km) to Rocky Mount, the Franklin County seat, and northeast across the Roanoke River 20 miles (32 km) to Bedford.

According to the United States Census Bureau, the CDP has a total area of 11.5 square miles (29.7 km^{2}), of which 10.1 square miles (26.1 km^{2}) is land and 1.4 square miles (3.6 km^{2}), or 12.19%, is water.

== History and culture ==
Booker T. Washington National Monument, comprising the tobacco farm where the African American educator and leader was born a slave, is in the western part of the CDP.

In the 1940s and 1950s, the town was known for its Ku Klux Klan activity.

A farmers' market operates between April and October.

== Demographics ==
Historical population
| Census | Pop. | Note | %± |
|---|---|---|---|
| 2000 | 899 | | — |
| 2020 | 1,553 | | — |
U.S. Decennial Census; 2000 2010 2020

Westlake Corner was first listed as a census designated place in the 2000 U.S. census.

=== 2020 census ===
As of the 2020 census, Westlake Corner had a population of 1,553. The median age was 62.8 years. 9.9% of residents were under the age of 18 and 42.8% of residents were 65 years of age or older. For every 100 females there were 98.1 males, and for every 100 females age 18 and over there were 93.1 males age 18 and over.

0.0% of residents lived in urban areas, while 100.0% lived in rural areas.

There were 705 households in Westlake Corner, of which 17.9% had children under the age of 18 living in them. Of all households, 56.2% were married-couple households, 14.6% were households with a male householder and no spouse or partner present, and 23.5% were households with a female householder and no spouse or partner present. About 29.5% of all households were made up of individuals and 19.8% had someone living alone who was 65 years of age or older.

There were 974 housing units, of which 27.6% were vacant. The homeowner vacancy rate was 2.5% and the rental vacancy rate was 13.9%.

Racial composition as of the 2020 census
| Race | Number | Percent |
|---|---|---|
| White | 1,444 | 93.0% |
| Black or African American | 23 | 1.5% |
| American Indian and Alaska Native | 7 | 0.5% |
| Asian | 12 | 0.8% |
| Native Hawaiian and Other Pacific Islander | 0 | 0.0% |
| Some other race | 7 | 0.5% |
| Two or more races | 60 | 3.9% |
| Hispanic or Latino (of any race) | 36 | 2.3% |

=== 2000 census ===
As of the census of 2000, there were 899 people, 389 households, and 322 families residing in the CDP. The population density was 89.2 people per square mile (34.4/km^{2}). There were 515 housing units at an average density of 51.1/sq mi (19.7/km^{2}). The racial makeup of the CDP was 96.44% White, 2.56% African American, 0.33% Asian, 0.11% Pacific Islander, 0.11% from other races, and 0.44% from two or more races. Hispanic or Latino of any race were 0.78% of the population.

There were 389 households, out of which 21.3% had children under the age of 18 living with them, 74.3% were married couples living together, 5.9% had a female householder with no husband present, and 17.2% were non-families. 14.4% of all households were made up of individuals, and 6.4% had someone living alone who was 65 years of age or older. The average household size was 2.31 and the average family size was 2.51.

In the CDP, the population was spread out, with 16.6% under the age of 18, 4.9% from 18 to 24, 23.4% from 25 to 44, 33.4% from 45 to 64, and 21.8% who were 65 years of age or older. The median age was 50 years. For every 100 females there were 107.6 males. For every 100 females age 18 and over, there were 104.4 males.

The median income for a household in the CDP was $50,405, and the median income for a family was $50,709. Males had a median income of $33,686 versus $22,778 for females. The per capita income for the CDP was $26,915. About 3.9% of families and 3.2% of the population were below the poverty line, including none of those under age 18 and 8.5% of those age 65 or over.
