= Burwell–Holland House =

Historic house in Virginia, United States

- U.S. National Register of Historic Places
- Virginia Landmarks Register
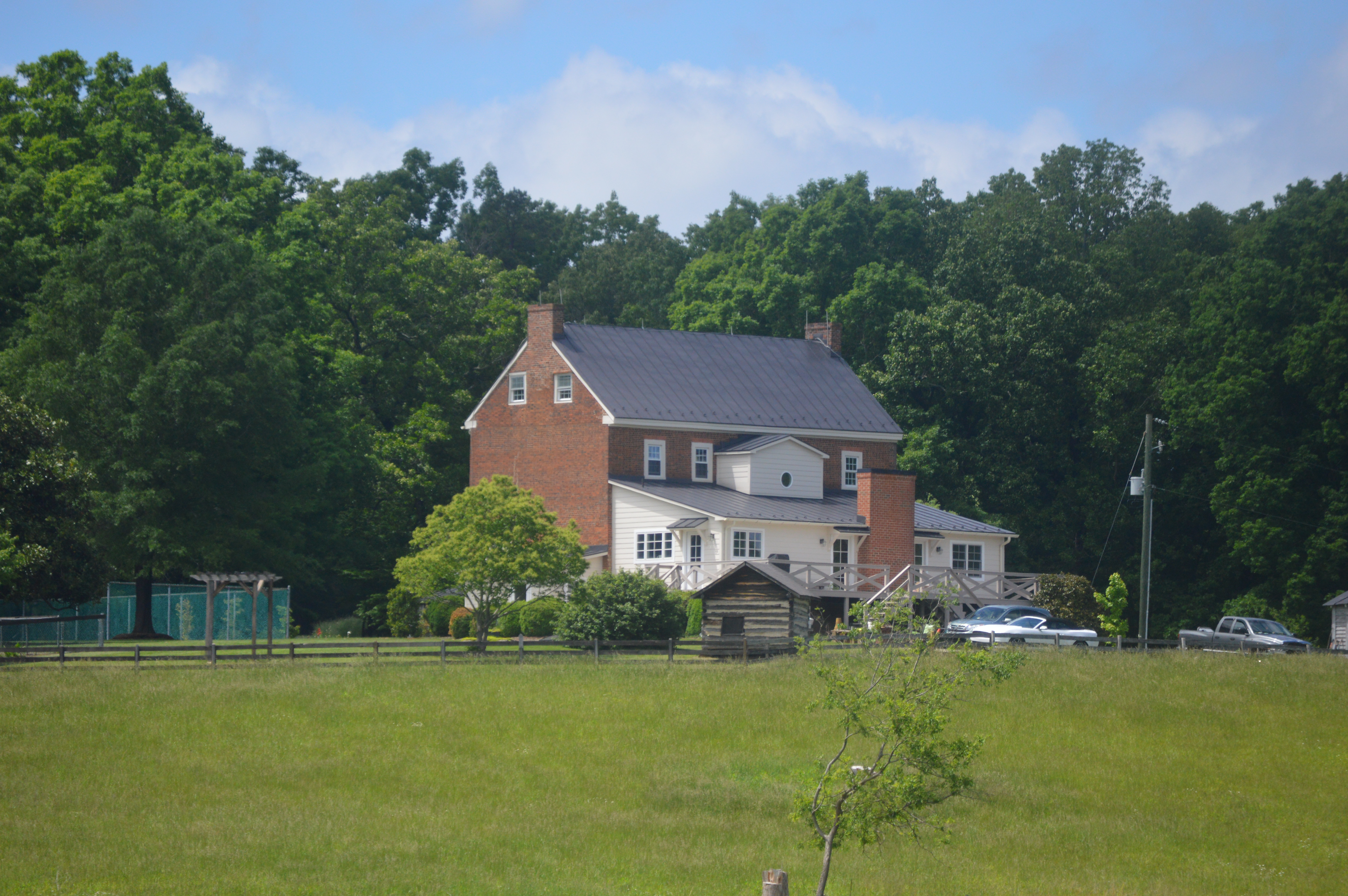
- Distant view from the southeast

- Location within Virginia Location within the United States
- Location: 600 Jacks Mountain Rd., Glade Hill, Virginia
- Coordinates: 36°58′38″N 79°44′35″W
- Area: 26.1 acres (10.6 ha)
- Built: 1798
- Architectural style: Federal
- NRHP reference No.: 02000624
- VLR No.: 033-0003

Significant dates
- Added to NRHP: June 6, 2002
- Designated VLR: September 14, 1998

Burwell–Holland House is a historic plantation home located near Glade Hill, Franklin County, Virginia. The original house dates back to 1798, and is a two-story, four-room Federal style brick dwelling. It measures 46 feet long and 21 feet wide with gable roof. A one-story, five-room frame, rear addition was added in 1976. Also on the property are a contributing saddlenotched log blacksmith shop, saddlenotched log and chink smokehouse / storehouse, a cemetery, a 19th-century post and beam barn and a 19th-century wood frame corn crib built on short stone pillars. It was the home of Congressman William A. Burwell (1780-1821), grandson of its builder Col. Lewis Burwell.

It was listed on the National Register of Historic Places in 2002.
