= Gwin Dudley Home Site =

Historic house in Virginia, United States

- U.S. National Register of Historic Places
- Virginia Landmarks Register
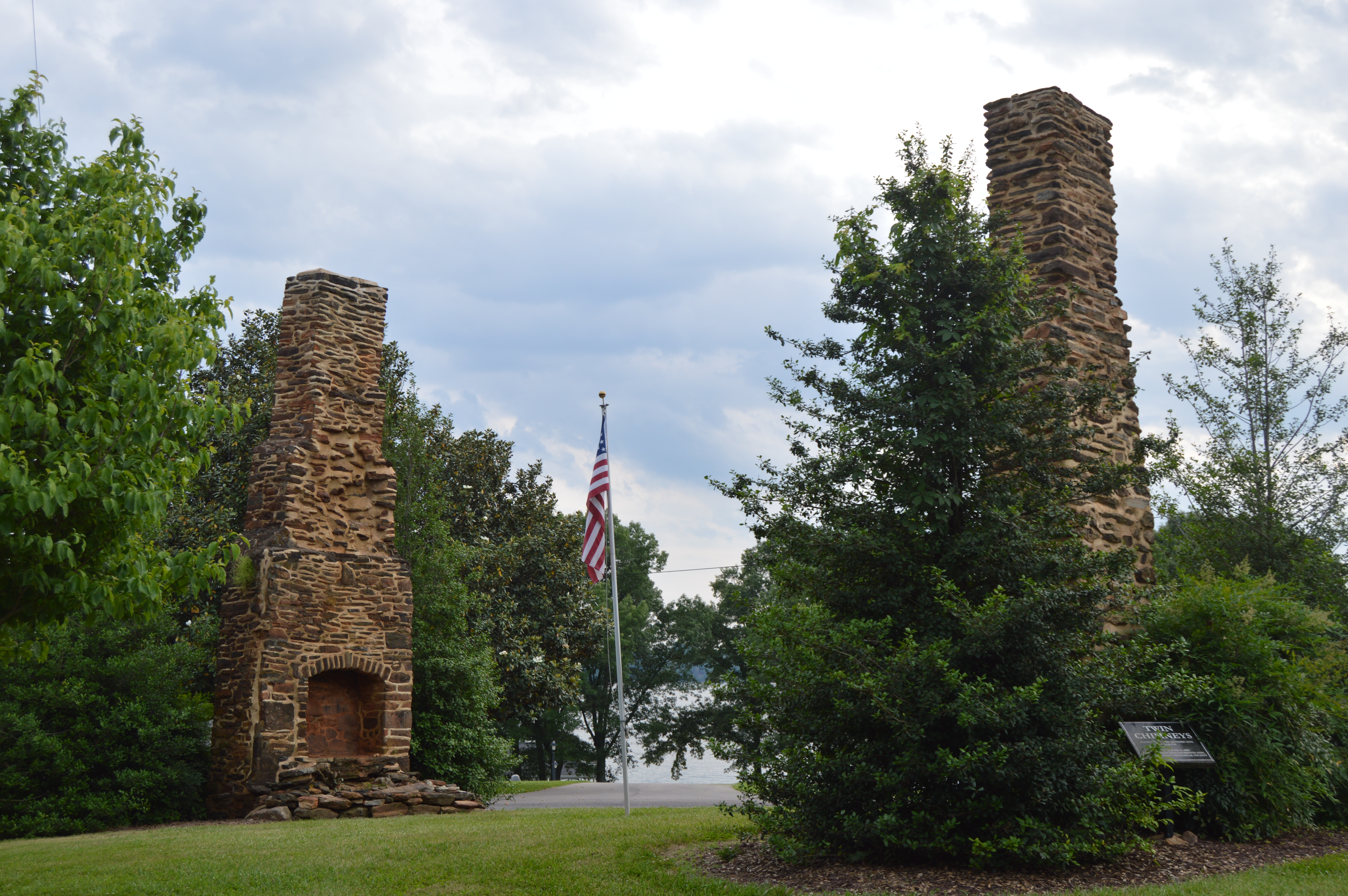
- Site of the house

- Location within Virginia Location within the United States
- Location: Twin Chimneys Dr., Wirtz, Virginia
- Coordinates: 37°2′50″N 79°41′20″W
- Area: less than one acre
- Built: c. 1795
- Built by: Gwin Dudley
- Architectural style: House ruin
- NRHP reference No.: 07000827
- VLR No.: 033-5172

Significant dates
- Added to NRHP: January 30, 2008
- Designated VLR: June 6, 2007

Gwin Dudley Home Site, also known as Twin Chimneys, is a historic home site located at Smith Mountain Lake, Wirtz, Franklin County, Virginia. The site consists of two extant stone chimneys that are situated 31 feet, 8 inches apart (inside face to inside face), indicating the length of the house, which was lost to fire in the early 20th century. They were part of a house erected about 1795.

A stone tablet, with the initials GD and the date 1795 inlaided into the stone, are prominently display on the south chimney, above the arch.

It was listed on the National Register of Historic Places in 2008.
