= Boones Mill, Virginia =

- Town
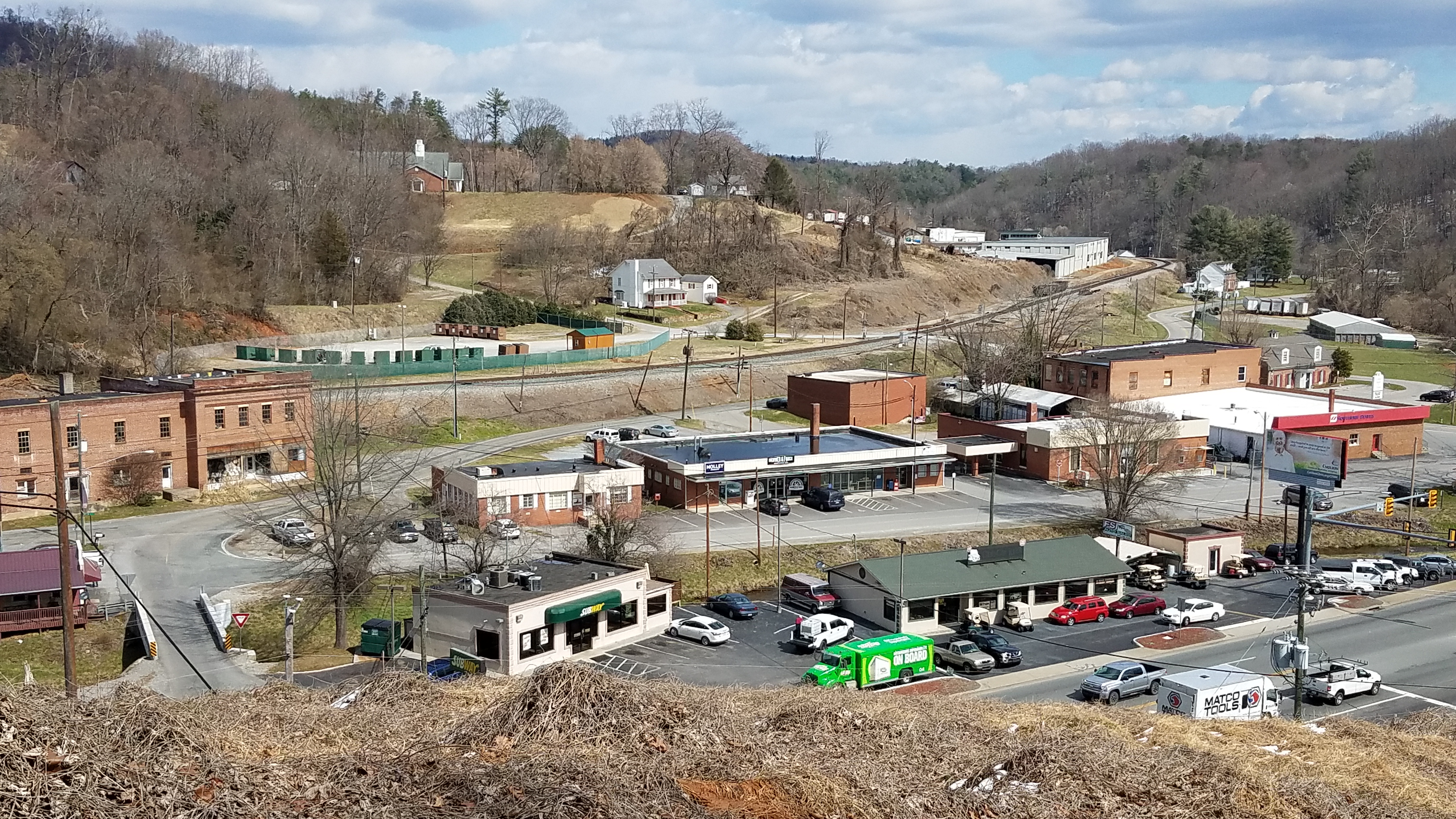
- (2018)

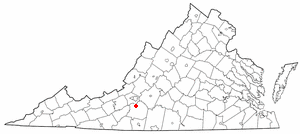
- Location in the state of Virginia
- Coordinates: 37°6′56″N 79°57′14″W
- Country: United States
- State: Virginia
- County: Franklin
- Town: 1927

Government
  - Mayor: Victor Conner

Area
  - Total: 0.74 sq mi (1.91 km^{2})
  - Land: 0.74 sq mi (1.91 km^{2})
  - Water: 0 sq mi (0.00 km^{2})
- Elevation: 1,150 ft (350 m)

Population (2020)
  - Total: 259
  - Estimate (2025): 275
- Time zone: UTC-5 (EST)
  - Summer (DST): UTC-4 (EDT)
- ZIP code: 24065
- Area code: 540
- FIPS code: 51-08584
- GNIS feature ID: 1492609
- Website: townofboonesmill.org

Boones Mill is a town in Franklin County, Virginia, United States. The population was 239 in 2018, and as of the 2020 census, Boones Mill had a population of 259.

== History ==
Boones Mill was incorporated in 1927. It was previously known as "Boone Mill" and "Boon Mill". The town is named after Jacob Boon who operated a mill in the town.

The Boones Mill Depot is listed on the National Register of Historic Places. Nearby historic sites include Bowman Farm, Cahas Mountain Rural Historic District, Jubal A. Early House, and Piedmont Mill Historic District.

== Geography ==
Boones Mill is located in northern Franklin County at 37°6′56″N 79°57′14″W (37.115462, -79.953966), along U.S. Route 220 at the southern base of the Blue Ridge Mountains. US 220 leads north 14 miles (23 km) to Roanoke and south 10 miles (16 km) to Rocky Mount, the Franklin County seat.

According to the United States Census Bureau, the town has a total area of 0.73 square miles (1.9 km^{2}), all land. The town lies in the valley of Maggodee Creek, a southeastward-flowing tributary of the Blackwater River, part of the Roanoke River watershed. Murray Knob, elevation 2,286 feet (697 m), rises 2 miles (3 km) to the north on the crest of the Blue Ridge, and the eastern end of Cahas Mountain, at 2,992 feet (912 m), is 2 miles to the west.

== Demographics ==
Historical population
Census	Pop.	Note	%±
1930	352		—
1940	377		7.1%
1950	335		−11.1%
1960	371		10.7%
1970	363		−2.2%
1980	344		−5.2%
2000	285		—
2010	239		−16.1%
2020	259		8.4%
2020 (est.)	259	▲	8.4%
U.S. Decennial Census

Boones Mill is part of the Roanoke Metropolitan Statistical Area.

=== 2020 census ===
As of the census of 2020, there were 259 people.

There were 131 households, out of which 26.0% had children under the age of 18 living with them, 50.4% were married couples living together, 5.3% had a female householder with no husband present, and 41.2% were non-families. Of all households, 34.4% were made up of individuals, and 10.7% had someone living alone who was 65 years of age or older. The average household size was 2.18 and the average family size was 2.82.

In the town, the population was spread out, with 20.4% under the age of 18, 9.1% from 18 to 24, 33.0% from 25 to 44, 22.5% from 45 to 64, and 15.1% who were 65 years of age or older. The median age was 36 years. For every 100 females there were 91.3 males. For every 100 women age 18 and over, there were 97.4 men.

The median income for a household in the town was $39,688, and the median income for a family was $44,821. Males had a median income of $37,500 versus $23,542 for females. The per capita income for the town was $16,795. About 3.8% of families and 8.2% of the population were below the poverty line, including 10.9% of those under the age of eighteen and 11.6% of those 65 or over.
