= Bowman Farm =

Historic house in Virginia, United States

- U.S. National Register of Historic Places
- Virginia Landmarks Register
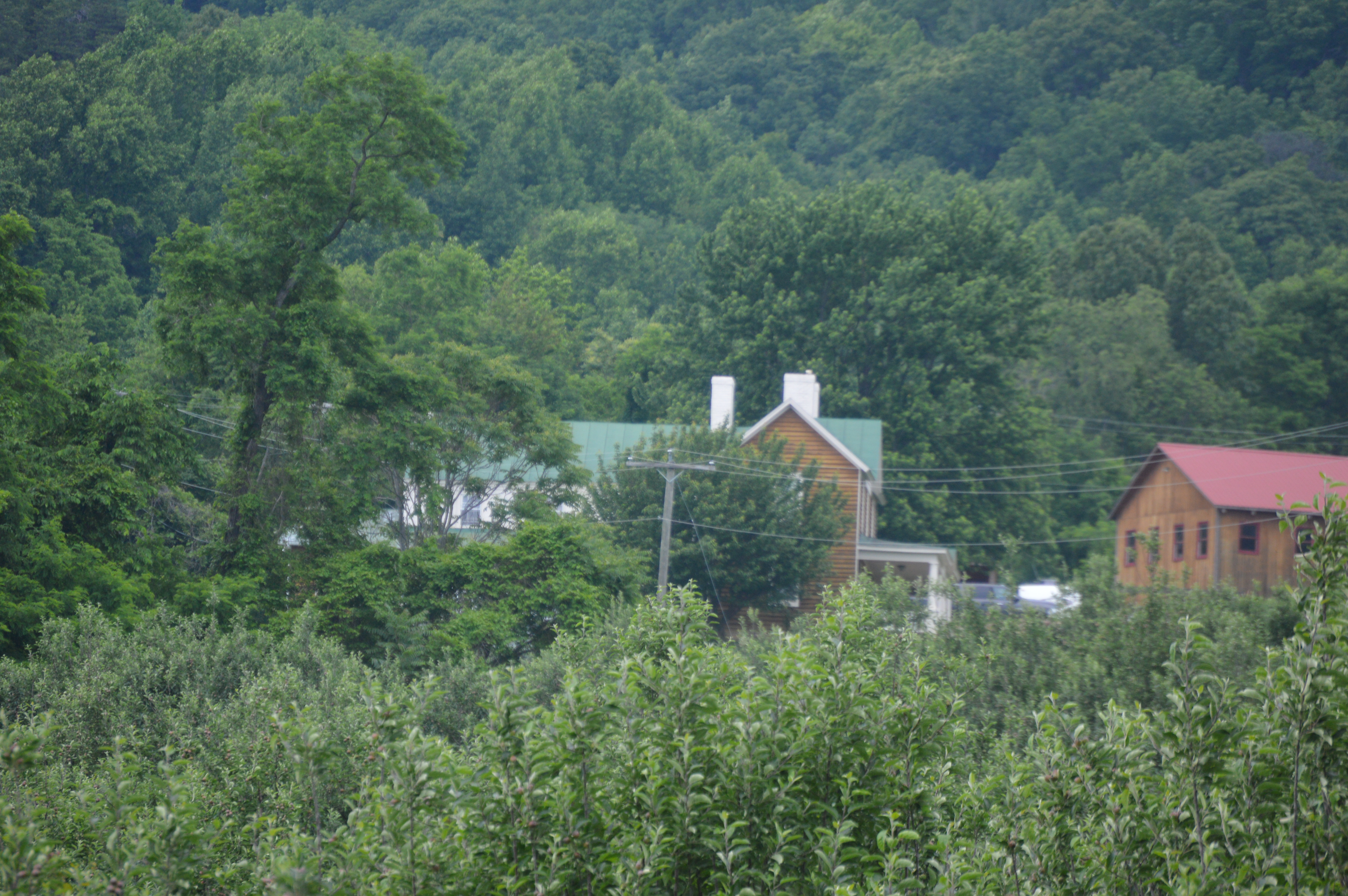
- Distant view from the south

- Location within Virginia Location within the United States
- Location: 1605 Cahas Mountain Rd., near Boones Mill, Virginia
- Coordinates: 37°06′24″N 80°01′11″W
- Area: 700 acres (280 ha)
- Built: 1833
- Architectural style: Georgian
- NRHP reference No.: 00000314
- VLR No.: 033-0283

Significant dates
- Added to NRHP: April 13, 2000
- Designated VLR: December 1, 1999

Bowman Farm is a historic home located near Boones Mill, Franklin County, Virginia. The original dwelling was built about 1833, and is the two-story rear wing with a Georgian style interior. Appended to the east gable-end of the original house is a two-story center-passage-plan frame section dating to about 1900. Both sections have metal-sheathed gable roofs. The house was renovated in 1999. Also on the property are a contributing log bank barn, frame barn, granary, and family cemetery.

It was listed on the National Register of Historic Places in 2000.
