= Cahas Mountain Rural Historic District =

Historic district in Virginia, United States

- U.S. National Register of Historic Places
- U.S. Historic district
- Virginia Landmarks Register
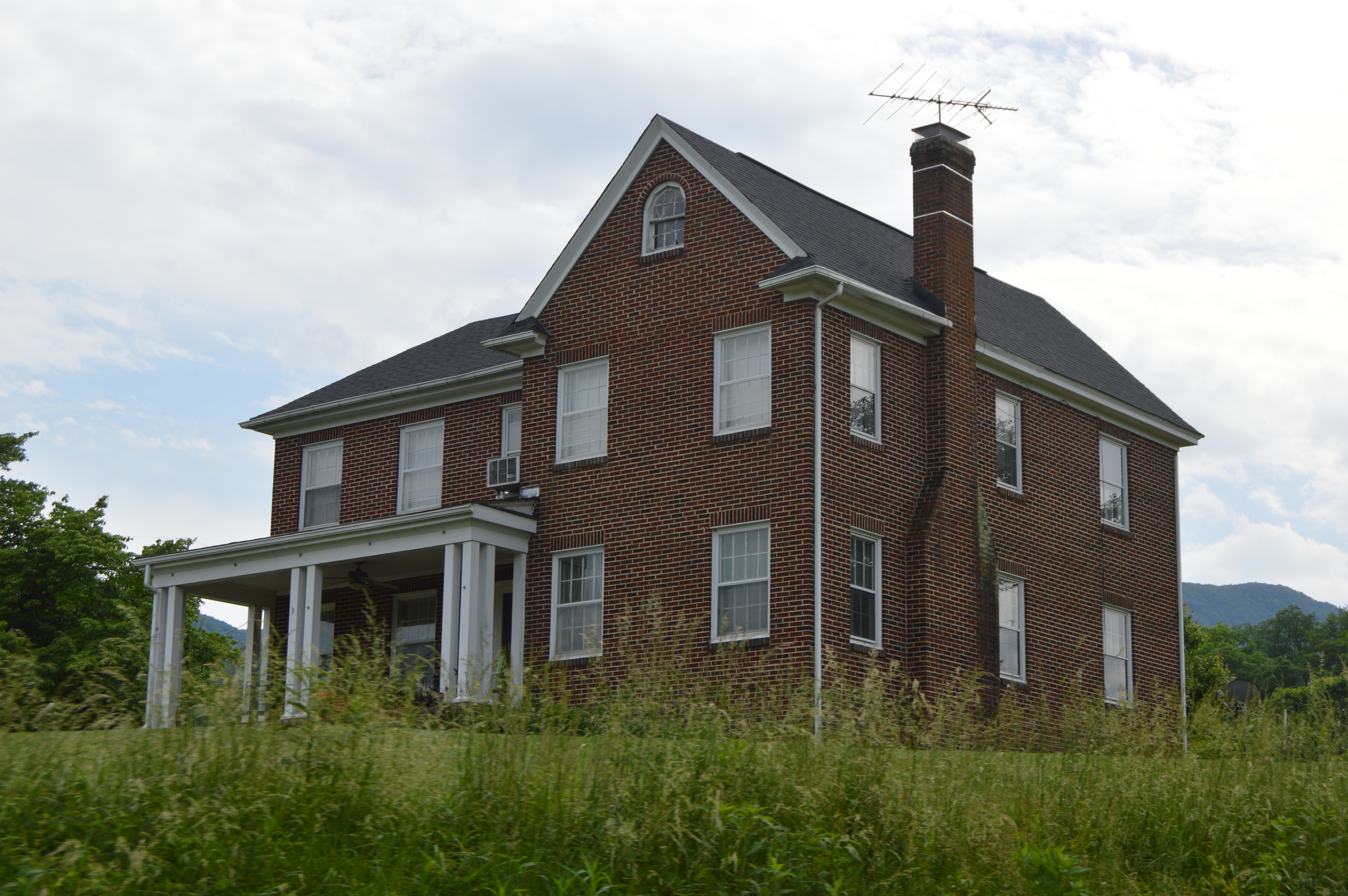
- House on Naff Road at Apple Road

- Location within Virginia Location within the United States
- Location: Jct. of VA 613 and US 220, Peak of Cahas Mt. to near Roanoke Co. line, near Boones Mill, Virginia
- Coordinates: 37°08′05″N 79°58′47″W
- Area: 1,450 acres (590 ha)
- Built: 1820
- Architect: Bernard, Silas W.; Nelson, Calvin R., et al.
- Architectural style: Late Victorian, Greek Revival, Federal
- NRHP reference No.: 96000593
- VLR No.: 033-0393

Significant dates
- Added to NRHP: June 7, 1996
- Designated VLR: March 20, 1996

Cahas Mountain Rural Historic District is a national historic district located near Boones Mill, Franklin County, Virginia. It encompasses 33 contributing buildings, 10 contributing sites, and 8 contributing structures. Most historic (above-ground) resources are associated with the four farms that compose the district. They include the John and Susan Boon House (c. 1820), Taylor-Price House (c. 1821, c. 1850), Boon-Garst House (1902, 1945-1946), and Washington and Rinda Boon House (1889). The historic sites include the Boone Cemetery (1911).

A portion of the Carolina Road roadbed can be seen at Maggoty Gap, where it crossed the Blue Ridge at Maggodee Gap. Today this is part of the Cahas Mountain Rural Historic District in Boones Mill, Virginia. The volume of travel along this part of the Carolina road was so great that it encouraged the construction of two brick homes from the 1820s, the John and Susan Boon House and the Taylor-Price house. The Boon house offered accommodations for travelers, and probably the Taylor Price House was also used as an inn.

It was listed on the National Register of Historic Places in 1996.
