= Glade Hill, Virginia =

Unincorporated community in Virginia, United States

- Unincorporated community
- Location within Virginia Location within the United States
- Coordinates: 36°59′23″N 79°45′46″W
- Country: United States
- State: Virginia
- County: Franklin
- Elevation: 1,060 ft (320 m)
- Time zone: UTC-5 (Eastern (EST))
  - Summer (DST): UTC-4 (EDT)
- ZIP code: 24092
- Area code: 540
- GNIS feature ID: 1494954

Glade Hill (also known as Gladehill) is an unincorporated community in Franklin County, Virginia, United States. Glade Hill is located on Virginia State Route 40, 7.2 miles (11.6 km) east of Rocky Mount. Glade Hill has a post office with ZIP code 24092, which opened on April 1, 1837.

The Burwell-Holland House was listed on the National Register of Historic Places in 2002.
