= Hardy, Virginia =

Unincorporated community in Virginia, United States

- Unincorporated community
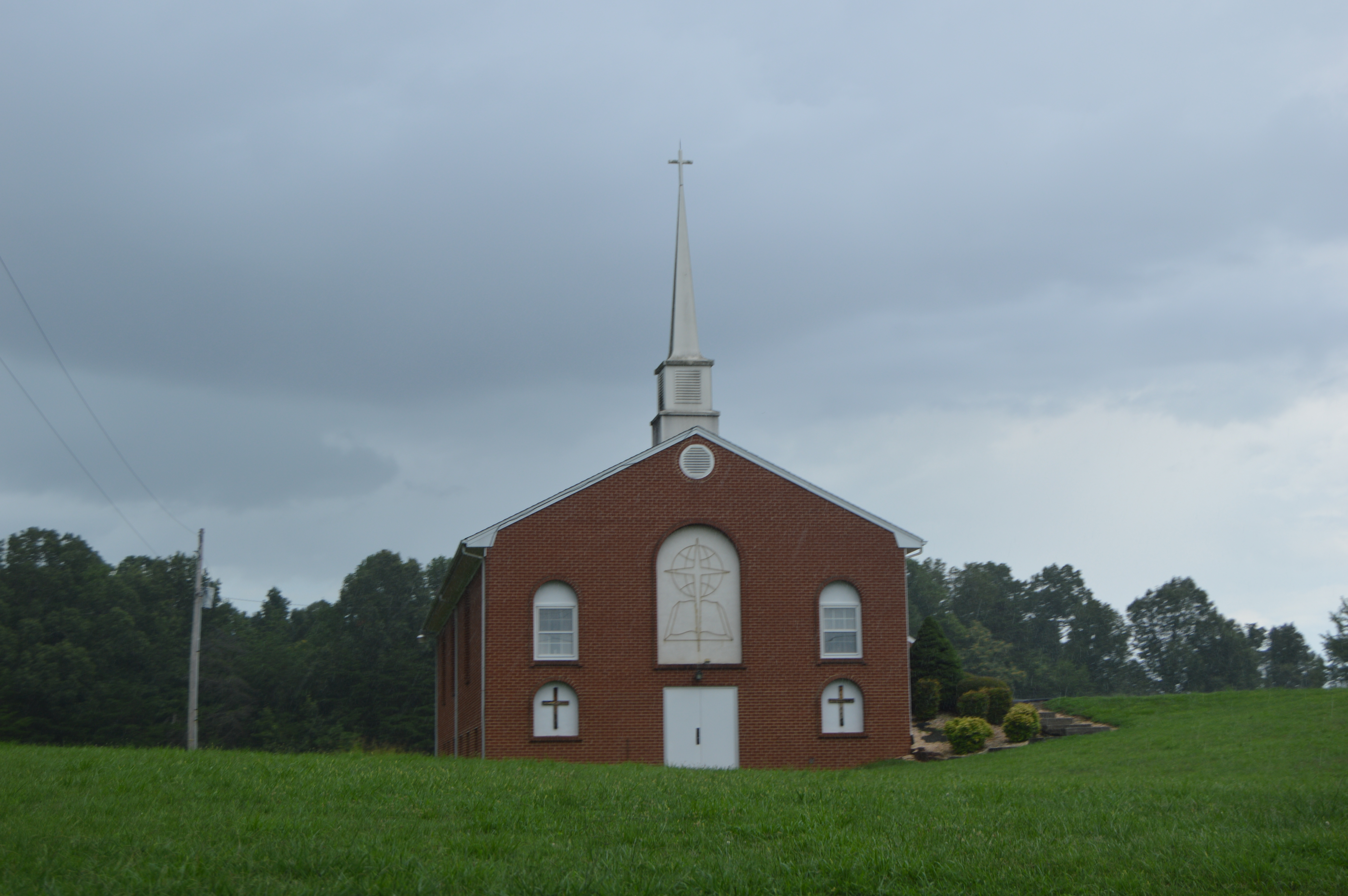
- Gravel Hill Baptist Church

- Location within Virginia Location within the United States
- Coordinates: 37°13′55″N 79°48′38″W
- Country: United States
- State: Virginia
- County: Bedford and Franklin
- Elevation: 997 ft (304 m)
- Time zone: UTC−5 (Eastern (EST))
  - Summer (DST): UTC−4 (EDT)
- ZIP Code: 24101
- Area codes: 540 and 826
- GNIS feature ID: 1477396

Hardy is an unincorporated community in southwestern Bedford County and northeastern Franklin County, Virginia, United States. The community lies along State Route 634 and is approximately nine miles southeast of Roanoke.

== History ==
The Booth–Lovelace House was listed on the National Register of Historic Places in 2002. The Booker T. Washington National Monument is also in Hardy.

== Recreation ==
The Roanoke River forms the mouth of Smith Mountain Lake in Hardy. Bay Rock Marina and the Virginia Department of Game and Inland Fisheries operated Hardy Ford Public Boating Access offer boating access to Smith Mountain Lake in Hardy.

== Government ==
The United States Postal Service operates the Hardy Post Office within the community. The Hardy ZIP Code extends to areas in both Bedford County and Franklin County.

== Education ==
The community is served by Bedford County Public Schools and Franklin County Public Schools. Public school students residing in the Bedford County portion of Hardy are zoned to attend either Goodview Elementary School or Stewartsville Elementary School, Staunton River Middle School, and Staunton River High School. Public school students residing in the Franklin County portion of Hardy are zoned to attend Windy Gap Elementary School, Benjamin Franklin Middle School, Franklin County High School.

The closest higher education institutions are located in Roanoke.

== Infrastructure ==
=== Public safety ===
Law enforcement is provided by the Bedford County Sheriff's Office and Franklin County Sheriff's Office. Fire protection is provided by the Hardy Volunteer Fire Company, which operates a fire station within the community. Emergency medical services are provided by the Hardy Life Saving and Rescue crew, which operates from a station within the community, and the Red Valley Volunteer Rescue Squad.

== Transportation ==
=== Air ===
The Roanoke-Blacksburg Regional Airport is the closest airport with commercial service to the community.

=== Roads ===
- Virginia State Route 634 (Hardy Road)

=== Rail ===
The Norfolk Southern operated Altavista District runs through the community. The closest passenger rail service is located in Roanoke.

== Notable people ==
- Jubal Anderson Early, Confederate General who was born near the bottom of Windy Gap Mountain.
- Charles Buddy Bolding, NCAA baseball coach
