= Jubal A. Early House =

Historic house in Virginia, United States

- U.S. National Register of Historic Places
- Virginia Landmarks Register
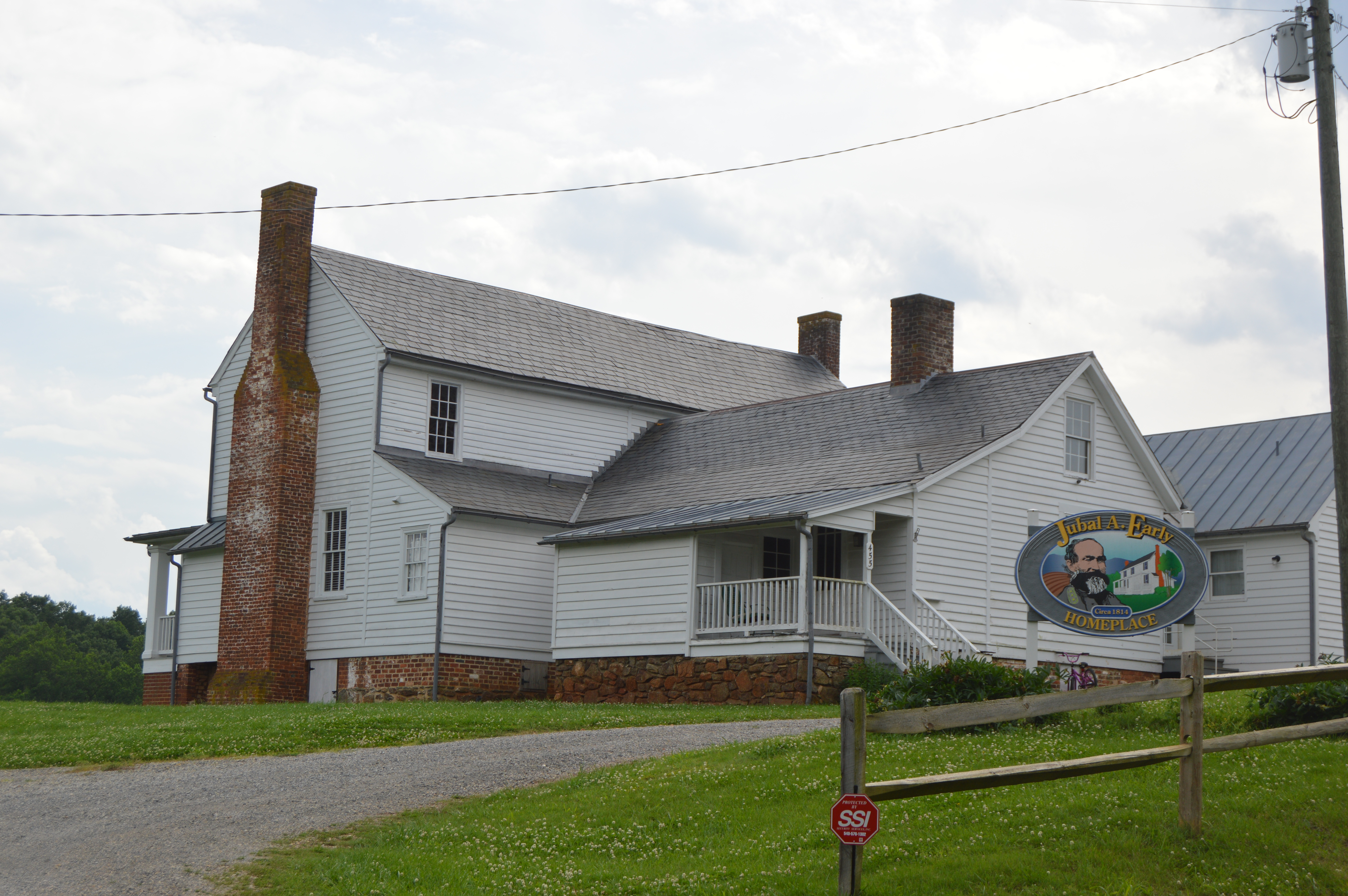
- Rear and eastern side

- Location within Virginia Location within the United States
- Location: NW of jct. of VA 116 and VA 684, near Boones Mill, Virginia
- Coordinates: 37°9′44″N 79°52′50″W
- Area: 8.1 acres (3.3 ha)
- Built: c. 1816, c. 1847
- Architectural style: Federal, Greek Revival
- NRHP reference No.: 97001507
- VLR No.: 033-0006

Significant dates
- Added to NRHP: December 11, 1997
- Designated VLR: September 17, 1997

The Jubal A. Early House, also known as the Jubal A. Early Homeplace and Archeological Site, is a historic home and archaeological site located near Boones Mill, Franklin County, Virginia. The original dwelling was built in the first decade of the 19th century, and enlarged after 1847. It is a two-story, four-bay, frame dwelling with a side gable roof. It has a rear ell and takes a "T" shape. It was the childhood home of Confederate General Jubal Early (1816-1894), whose father Joab managed a tobacco plantation of more than 4,000 acres. The property was sold by the Early family in 1847. The Jubal A. Early Preservation Trust has owned the property since 1995.

It was listed on the National Register of Historic Places in 1997.
