= Otter Creek Archaeological Site (Ferrum, Virginia) =

Archaeological site in Virginia, United States

- Otter Creek Archaeological Site (44FR31)
- U.S. National Register of Historic Places
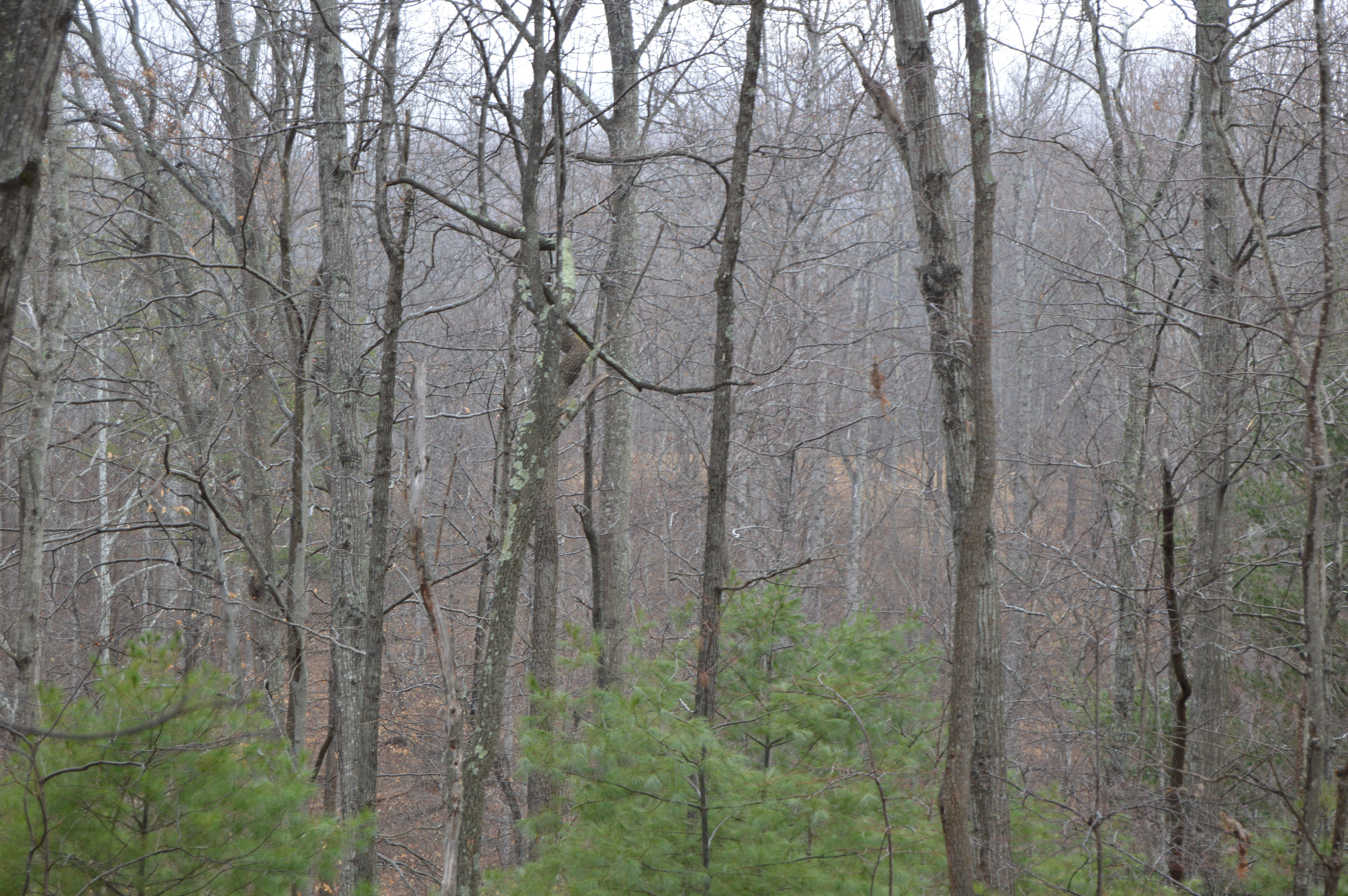
- Distant view from the east
- Nearest city: Ferrum, Virginia
- Area: 2 acres (0.81 ha)
- NRHP reference No.: 85000986
- Added to NRHP: May 9, 1985

The Otter Creek Archaeological Site is a prehistoric Native American site in rural Franklin County, Virginia. Located in the uplands of the Blue Ridge Mountains near Ferrum, the site encompasses a settlement that has been dated to the Late Woodland Period (c. AD 1300-1600). Finds at the site included fired lumps of clay, suggestive of the idea that clay pipes and other artifacts were made here.

The site occupies approximately 8,000 square metres (86,000 sq ft) of hilly woodland at the headwaters of Otter Creek; it was cultivated into the 1940s, but it has since reverted to forest. Although first reported to the Archaeological Society of Virginia in 1983, the site had been known locally for many years. It had been discovered by playful digging by local children, who were surprised and scared to discover human bones in their holes. Upon first visiting the site, Archaeological Society visitors were surprised to discover that this site, despite its location on a spur of the Blur Ridge, yielded pottery of a sort generally found in floodplain sites.

Initial excavation was conducted in August 1984. The excavators found extensive cultural debris: large numbers of flakes, potsherds, and complete small pottery objects. Bones from numerous animal species were also discovered, including small and large mammals, turtles, and a collection of fish, snails, and mussels that once occurred in Otter Creek but have disappeared due to a reduced flow from the nearby streams. Triangular projectile points, derived from nearby quartz boulders, were also discovered. The excavators concluded that the site had been a hamlet either from the Archaic or Woodland periods. Its greatest significance lies in its capability to reveal the history of local pottery-making and of the exploitation of animal species since extirpated from the area. Because the immediate vicinity offers a shallow climb to the summit of the Blue Ridge, the excavators also concluded that the hamlet might have sat along a trail used as a regional trade route.

The site was listed on the National Register of Historic Places in 1985.
