= Blackwater River (Roanoke River tributary) =

Coordinates: 37.025308°N 79.984845°W

Location
- Country: United States

Physical characteristics
- Source
  - location: Virginia

The Blackwater River is a river in the United States state of Virginia. It is a tributary of the Roanoke River.

== See also ==
- List of rivers of Virginia
