= Wirtz, Virginia =

Unincorporated community in Virginia, United States

- Unincorporated community
- Location within Virginia Location within the United States
- Coordinates: 37°04′36″N 79°53′22″W
- Country: United States
- State: Virginia
- County: Franklin
- Elevation: 1,099 ft (335 m)
- Time zone: UTC−5 (Eastern (EST))
  - Summer (DST): UTC−4 (EDT)
- ZIP code: 24184
- Area code: 540
- GNIS feature ID: 1477892

Wirtz is an unincorporated community in Franklin County, Virginia, United States. Wirtz is located along a railroad 5.4 miles (8.7 km) north of Rocky Mount. Wirtz has a post office with ZIP code 24184, which opened on April 20, 1893.

The Gwin Dudley Home Site was listed on the National Register of Historic Places in 2008.
