= John Wilson (Pittsylvania) =

American planter, patriot and politician

Member of the Virginia House of Delegates for Pittsylvania County
- In office May 1782 – May 4, 1783 Serving with Constant Perkins
- Preceded by: Benjamin Lankford
- Succeeded by: Benjamin Lankford
- In office May 4, 1778 – April 30, 1780 Serving with Abraham Shelton, Benjamin Lankford
- Preceded by: Peter Perkins
- Succeeded by: Thomas Terry

Personal details
- Born: John Wilson circa 1740 Colony of Virginia
- Died: circa 1820 Dan's Hill, Pittsylvania County, Virginia, U.S.
- Spouse: Mary Lumpkin
- Children: Robert Wilson

Military service
- Branch/service: Virginia militia
- Rank: county lieutenant
- Battles/wars: American Revolutionary War

John Wilson (ca 1740 – 1820) was an American patriot, planter, merchant and politician who represented Pittsylvania County, Virginia three times in the Virginia House of Delegates as well as at the Virginia Ratifying Convention, and later helped found the town of Danville which now owns a home erected by his son.

== Early and family life ==
Born possibly in North Carolina, else in then-vast Halifax County, he was the son of Peter Wilson who patented land on the north side of the Dan River near Sandy Creek in 1746. His parents (his mother's name was Aisley) emigrated from Scotland, and Peter Wilson established a ferry across the Dan River about seven miles west of Danville, and became one of the first justices of the peace of Halifax County when it was established in 1752, as well as served as a vestryman and officer in the local militia. The family included eight children, of whom his sister Agnes married Peter Perkins, who established the Berry Hill plantation and would serve in many offices alongside this man, as discussed below.

== Career ==
Wilson became a justice of the peace when the county was formed in 1767, and soon captain in the local militia. He operated a store as factor for Field and Call. Wilson also held various local offices at times, including sheriff, vestryman of Camden parish, and overseer of the poor.

When his father died in 1764, Wilson inherited a 300-acre plantation, which he would expand. His successful business ventures included a ferry and a store. By 1782 Wilson owned 4070 acres. In 1787, Col. Wilson owned 18 teenage enslaved Blacks, as well as 28 enslaved adults, 14 horses, 51 cattle and a four-wheeled state in Pittsylvania county. In 1775 Wilson became a member of the local Committee of Safety, and also signed a local resolution against importing British goods, as well as helped found the town of Danville. During the American Revolutionary War, Wilson was promoted to colonel (in 1775, succeeding Robert Williams (the commonwealth attorney i.e. county prosecutor, who was promoted to Pittsylvania county lieutenant), and then succeeded Williams as Pittsylvania county lieutenant when former burgess and county lieutenant John Donelson left for Tennessee. The county lieutenant was essentially the highest executive office in the county, and so controlled the militia and obtained provisions for them and the Continental Army. Thus, Wilson did not personally lead troops in the field during the war. In the decade after the conflict ended, Wilson served as the county secretary.

Pittsylvania County voters elected Wilson as one of their (part-time) delegates to the Virginia House of Delegates in 1778, and re-elected him in 1779, then other men served as part-time legislators, perhaps because Wilson's other county offices were considered a conflict of interest. Pittsylvania voters again elected Wilson as one of their delegates for a single term in 1782. In 1788, Pittsylvania voters elected Wilson and Williams as their representatives to the Virginia Ratifying Convention. Both men perhaps following the lead of the original Pittsylvania County's other leading man (until the split-off of Henry County), Patrick Henry voted (unsuccessfully) against adoption of the federal Constitution. That narrow adoption vote may have led James Madison to draft the Bill of Rights pursuant to an earlier document drafted by another prominent anti-Federalist, George Mason, the Virginia Declaration of Rights.

== Personal life ==
Wilson married Mary Lumpkins in 1767, who bore eleven children and survived him. Four of their sons served as officers in the War of 1812. Their son Peter WIlson bought Berry Hill from Peter Perkins, as well as married Ruth Stovall Hairston.

== Death and legacy ==
Wilson's precise death date, like his birth date, are unclear. He was buried at his Dan's Hill plantation, and his parents were buried at the adjacent Ferry Farm, which still existed in 1976. Wilson's last will and testament, which bequeathed Dan's Hill and other property to his seventh son Robert (upon the condition that the houses not be transferred until after the death of his wife) was recorded in 1820. Robert Wilson entered into a contract with a prominent local builder, DeJarnette in 1823. However, Mary Wilson's will was admitted to probate in 1827, and the property appreciated significantly around 1830. Thus some historians presume that was when the current historic building was finished. It was restored in the early 20th century by Mr. and Mrs. John G. Boatwright, and was one of the showplaces of Southside Virginia in that era.

None of John Wilson's sons carried on his political activism, although distant relatives (through his father) became governors in North Carolina and Georgia. Peter Wilson, the eldest son and who had served on the Committee of Safety with his father and others in 1775, and received payment for ferry service during the American Revolutionary War, purchased Berry Hill in 1795 when Peter Perkins moved to North Carolina to better supervise an iron forge. He and his wife, the former Sallie Ellis of Goochland County, had eight children before his will was admitted to probate in 1801. Their daughter Agnes P.J. Wilson married Samuel Pannill Hairston who built Oak Hill plantation in 1823, and who supposedly owned 2,000 enslaved people in Virginia and North Carolina by the time of his death. One of their daughters, Ailsey, married Samuel Harden Hairston, and their daughter Ruth Hairston married A.V. Sims, so Berry Hill passed through the Sims Family.
