= Peter Perkins =

American planter, patriot and politician

Member of the Virginia House of Delegates for Pittsylvania County
- In office 1777–1778 Serving with Abraham Shelton
- Preceded by: position established
- Succeeded by: John Wilson

Member of the Virginia House of Burgesses for Pittsylvania County
- In office 1775–1776 Serving with Benjamin Lankford
- Preceded by: Hugh Innes
- Succeeded by: position abolished

Personal details
- Born: Peter Perkins; March 26, 1739 Goochland County, Colony of Virginia
- Died: February 12, 1813 (aged 73) Williamson County, Tennessee, U.S.
- Spouse: Phyllis Agnes Wilson

Military service
- Allegiance: United States
- Branch/service: Virginia militia
- Rank: Lt. Col.
- Battles/wars: American Revolutionary War

Peter Perkins (March 26, 1739 – February 12, 1813) was an American patriot, planter and politician who represented Pittsylvania County, Virginia during the final session of the House of Burgesses, several of the Virginia Revolutionary Conventions and in the first session of the Virginia House of Delegates, as well as led the county militia during the American Revolutionary War.

== Early life and education ==
Probably the eldest surviving son born in then-vast Goochland County (in a part that later became Hanover County) to the former Bethania Hardin and her farmer husband, Col. Nicholas Perkins (1718–1762). The family soon moved southward to the area drained by the Dan River in what was then Halifax County (and became Pittsylvania County five years after his death) and about 1745 Nicholas Sr. started a plantation at Berry Hill, which this son inherited upon his father's death in 1762. Perkins had at least three younger brothers. Constant Perkins (1747-1790) inherited their father's last Pittsylvania home (which was torn down circa 1905), and like this brother also served as in the Virginia House of Delegates representing Pittsylvania County 1782-1788, but had no children during his marriage to Agatha Marr. Nicholas Perkins (1745-1800) would marry Leah Pryor of Orange County, North Carolina and in 1767 erected the first separate Baptist Church in Virginia (known as the Dan River Church) but would later move his family to Tennessee. Another brother was Thomas Hardin Perkins (1757–1838). This man's sisters included: Bethania (1743-1809, who married Col. Absalom Bostick and moved to what was Rowan County but is now Stokes County, North Carolina), Anne (1752-1829, who married Joseph Henry Scales and moved to Henry County, Virginia), Mary (1754-1798, who married Thomas Hardeman and moved to Davidson County, Tennessee) and Elizabeth (1759-1819, who married Peter Hairston and remained in Pittsylvania County although her husband also owned plantations in North Carolina).

== Career ==
Peter Perkins invested in real estate in Pittsylvania County as well as in North Carolina. He also operated an ordinary (tavern and inn) at his home, and farmed tobacco using enslaved labor. Although Peter Perkins does not appear in the published 1787 Virginia tax census, in 1782 he paid taxes for 25 slaves in Pittsylvania County; his brother Nicholas was taxed for 26 slaves and Constant Perkins paid taxes based on 18 slaves.

Decades earlier, Pittsylvania voters elected Perkins and fellow militia captain Benjamin Lankford their representatives to what proved to be the final session of the House of Burgesses, which began in 1775. After Governor Dunmore prorogued (suspended) that assembly, Pittsylvania voters elected Perkins and Lankford and the men they had replaced as burgesses (Hugh Innes who lived in the county's western section and would help found new Patrick Henry County in 1777, and John Donelson who was Pittsylvania's county lieutenant but planned to move to Tennessee) their representatives to the first Virginia Revolutionary Conventions, and Perkins and Lankford to most of the others. However, no record exists that Lankford nor Perkins actually appeared at the Third Revolutionary Convention and Perkins was not elected to the final convention, nor as to the first session of the Virginia House of Delegates. Voters also elected Perkins as one of Pittsylvania County's two representatives in the newly established Virginia House of Delegates; this time he served in the part-time position alongside Abraham Shelton.

Meanwhile, during the conflict, the patriotic Perkins served on the county' Committee of Safety since its inception in 1775 (among 31 members, alongside his wealthy brothers-in-law John Wilson and Peter Wilson Jr.), as well as led a company of the Pittsylvania County militia, rising in rank from captain (one of 27 in the county during the conflict) to major to lieutenant colonel. However, authorities disagree as to whether Perkins ever led troops in the field. Although local historian Maud Carter Clement believed Capt. Perkins led the local militia during the French and Indian War (decades earlier) and at the Battle of Guilford Courthouse in March 1781, modern historians have not found corroborative documentation. Like fellow Pittsylvania delegate Abraham Shelton, Perkins' major revolutionary wartime activity involved gathering supplies for the troops within the county, which held one of the Commonwealth's major depots at Peytonsburg. During the three months that Perkins' home served as a hospital as discussed below, Perkins also operated a ferry. Perkins also at various times served as the Pittsylvania county sheriff. His brother-in-law John Wilson became colonel of the county's troops and ultimately county lieutenant (chief administrative officer in that era; in both cases succeeding Robert Williams who in 1775 had been the militia's colonel and succeeded John Donelson as county lieutenant in 1778-1779).

After the Battle of Guilford Courthouse in March 1781, Perkins' home, Berry Hill, along with nearby plantation houses of his brothers, and of William Harrison (who had emigrated from Goochland County circa 1770), served as hospitals (and cemeteries) for those wounded during the battle. Peter Perkins later received more reimbursement than the other three men: £50 for the rental (in addition to £45.10 for Perkins' services as commissary for 90 days and £89 for five horses, plus additional sums for 322 pounds of bacon, 1128 pounds of pork, 6 sheep, 60 pounds tallow, 12 pounds beeswax, 105 pounds of bar iron and 6 sheep for the recuperating soldiers) compared to £40 to his brother Constant for house rental, £35 for Harrison for his home's rental and £16.10 awarded Nicholas Perkins for damage to his home.

Perkins remained in Pittsylvania County for a while after the war, but sold Berry Hill to Major Peter Wilson (son of his brother in law John Wilson). Clearly, by 1795 had moved across the border to North Carolina, where he and a partner owned an iron furnace, and Perkins may also have continued his political career with a term in the North Carolina legislature.

== Personal life ==
He married Agnes Wilson, whose father Peter Wilson patented land along Sandy Creek (a tributary of the Dan River) and became an important figure in Pittsylvania County (an early justice of the peace tho never a burgess); one ford of the Dan River continues to bear the Wilson family's name. Peter and Agnes had sons James and Nicholas Perkins, as well as daughters Bethania (who married Lemuel Smith), Elizabeth (who married John Pryor and after his death, William Henley Stone) and Alcey (who married Peter Hairston).

== Death and legacy ==
Ultimately, Perkins moved to Tennessee, as did his son Nicholas, Perkins is buried in Poplar Grove Cemetery near Henning/Ripley TN. Perkins freed four enslaved people in his will. His descendants (through his son Nicholas) continued to own Berry Hill through the 20th century. The land has now been acquired by the City of Danville, which plans to construct an industrial park on that and adjacent acreage.
