= Hugh Innes (burgess) =

American planter, patriot and politician

Member of the Virginia House of Delegates for Henry County
- In office May 5, 1783 – September 1791 Serving with Patrick Henry
- Preceded by: Peter Saunders
- Succeeded by: Peter Saunders

Member of the House of Burgesses for Pittsylvania County
- In office 1769–1774 Serving with John Donelson
- Preceded by: position established
- Succeeded by: Peter Perkins

Personal details
- Born: Hugh Innes; August 12, 1729 Scotland
- Died: March 22, 1797 (aged 67) Franklin County, Virginia, U.S.
- Spouse: Hannah Eggleston
- Relations: Harry Innes, James Innes
- Children: 4 sons including Robert Innes

Military service
- Allegiance: United States
- Branch/service: Virginia militia
- Rank: colonel

Hugh Innes (August 12, 1729 – March 22, 1797) (sometimes spelled Innis) was an American patriot, attorney, real estate investor and politician who represented Pittsylvania County, Virginia in the House of Burgesses and first Virginia Revolutionary Convention, but whose home was located in Henry County by 1783 (during which he served as delegate for one term alongside the county's namesake and future Governor Patrick Henry) and helped secure the creation of Franklin County.

== Early and family life ==
Sources disagree as to whether this man's father was William Innes or James Innes, and his surname is also sometimes spelled "Innis"—all of which affect the precise relationship between this man and two orphaned brothers, the sons of Scottish immigrant Rev. Robert Innes of Caroline County: future U.S. District Judge Harry Innes of Kentucky and Virginia attorney general James Innes of Williamsburg. However, all agree that they were related. Their father was either this man's uncle, cousin or half-brother. This man's last will named that Harry Innes (as well as local merchant Samuel Callend) as administrators of the estate and charged them to educate this man's youngest children. During Innes' legislative visits to Williamsburg, the colonial capital, as described below, Innes met Hannah Eggleston, whom he married there (technically in James City County in 1772), and whom he survived. His sons were Robert, Hugh, (another) James and (another) Harry and his surviving daughters were Mrs. Turley and Elizabeth Eggleston Innes.

== Career ==
Trained as a lawyer, after the French and Indian War ended in the 1760s, Innes settled near the Pigg River and Elkhorn River in an area which at the end of his life became the Snow Creek district of Franklin County. It was about 30 or 40 miles from the earliest Pittsylvania county seat at Peytonsburg. Innes was one of the eight landowners who established Pittsylvania County from then-vast Halifax County in 1769, and served as a justice of the peace in that new county, as well as on the Antrim Parish vestry. Henry County was established from Pittsylvania County in 1777; Franklin County would be created in 1785 and Patrick County in 1791. The inventory of Innes's estate in 1798 included land in Franklin County as well as Patrick County and Montgomery County and the new state of Kentucky. Some of it may have reflected a thousand pounds sterling Innes lent to fellow burgess John Donelson mentioned below in 1773, for which Donaldson mortgaged his 1019 acre home plantation in Pittsylvania County (including eighteen slaves) and which he used to construct a bloomery (primitive iron forge) in what became Franklin county.

Meanwhile, Pittsylvania County voters elected Innes and Donelson (who had moved there from eastern Maryland and would move to Tennessee in 1779), as their first representatives to the House of Burgesses in 1769, and re-elected both men until what turned out to be the last session of the House of Burgesses in 1774, in which both were replaced, although then all four former burgesses represented Pittsylvania County at the first Virginia Revolutionary Convention. On May 27, 1774, Innes and Donelson, as well as Charles Lynch and Hugh Talbot (of what was then Bedford County but would also become Franklin County) were among the signatories of a nonimportation act. Innes also served a single term in the House of Delegates in 1783 representing Henry County upon its formation (and also served as one of that county's original justices of the peace) and helped secure the creation of Franklin County.

When the Franklin County court met for the first time in January 1786 at the ordinary owned by prominent ironmaker James Callaway, Innes was not present, so his tenure among the first justices of the peace (and coroner) for the new county began a month later, as did the tenure of Robert Williams as the commonwealth attorney for Franklin County. Innes was the eighth wealthiest taxpayer in Franklin County in 1786. He was also among eight storekeepers licensed in 1787. However, Innes' tenure in contentious Franklin County did not prove smooth, for Thomas Arthur (who served in the Virginia House of Delegates in 1787 and 1788 as well as in the Virginia Ratifying Convention in 1788) and fellow Franklin justice of the peace John Rentfro, in 1786 complained to Governor Patrick Henry that Innes was an improper choice for colonel of the new county's militia because of his short stature, age and supposed lack of demonstrated affection to the patriot cause in the previous war. Having served alongside Innes in the Pittsylvania Committee of Safety, Henry issued the commission nonetheless, and Innes took the oath of office on July 3, 1786.

In the 1787 Virginia tax census, Col. Hugh Innis paid taxes in Franklin County for owning six enslaved teenaged Blacks and six Black adults, as well as ten horses and 25 cattle, and was the only taxpayer in the county with that surname. Nearly a decade later, his estate included 24 enslaved people, including five men, nine women, six boys and four girls, as well as five horses, 29 cattle, 36 hogs, seven sheep, household equipment and a "Library of Books".

== Death and legacy ==
Innes died in Franklin County, Virginia in 1797, and the probate of his will was one of the first acts of the circuit court for the new county. His eldest son Robert Innes began repeating his father's career path with service as a militia officer (including during the War of 1812), and several terms as one of Franklin County's representatives in the Virginia House of Delegates between 1804 and 1814, but moved to Fayette County, Kentucky before his death.
