= Rocky Mount Historic District =

Historic district in Virginia, United States

- U.S. National Register of Historic Places
- U.S. Historic district
- Virginia Landmarks Register
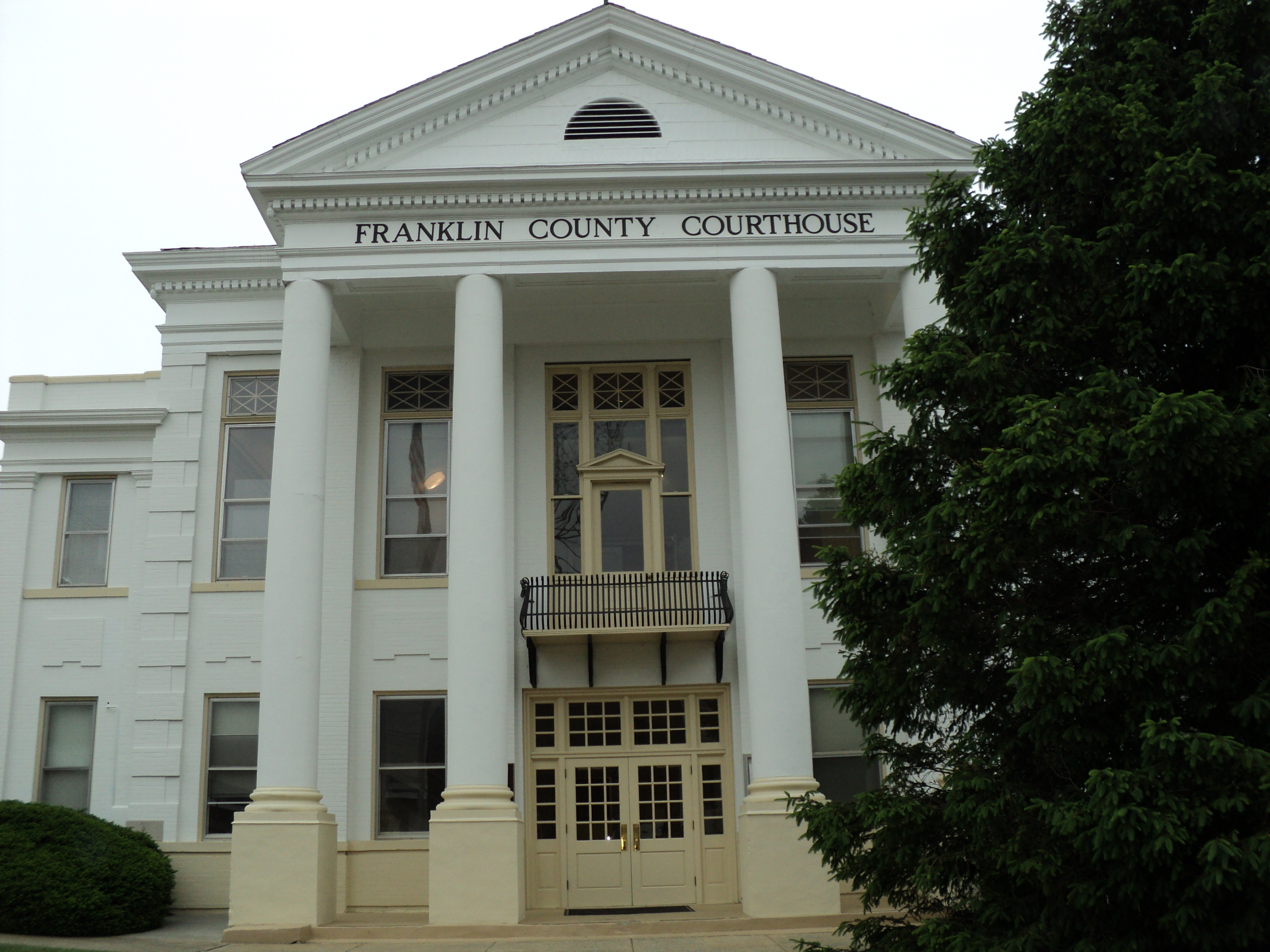
- Franklin County Courthouse, May 2010

- Location within Virginia Location within the United States
- Location: Roughly bounded by Franklin, and Maynor Sts.; Floyd Ave.; E. Court St; and Maple Ave., Rocky Mount, Virginia
- Coordinates: 36°59′49″N 79°53′20″W
- Area: 122 acres (49 ha)
- Built: 1827
- Built by: Huggins, H.H.; et al.
- Architectural style: Greek Revival, Gothic Revival
- NRHP reference No.: 99000683, 08000421 (Boundary Increase)
- VLR No.: 157-5002

Significant dates
- Added to NRHP: June 3, 1999, May 15, 2008 (Boundary Increase)
- Designated VLR: March 17, 1999, March 20, 2008

Rocky Mount Historic District is a national historic district located at Rocky Mount, Franklin County, Virginia. It encompasses 211 contributing buildings, 2 contributing sites (Mary Elizabeth Park and High Street Cemetery), 1 contributing site, and 2 contributing objects in the central business district and surround residential areas of Rocky Mount, county seat of Franklin County. It includes residential, commercial, institutional, and governmental buildings dated from the early- to mid-19th through early 20th centuries. Notable buildings include the Rakes Building (1929), N&W Freight Depot (c. 1907), Mount Pleasant (1828–1829), The Taliaffero Building (1827–1828), The Grove (1850), McCall House (c. 1907), Lodge Rooms (Colored) (c. 1900), Trinity Episcopal Church (c. 1874), Rocky Mount Presbyterian Church (c. 1880), Baptist Church (Colored) (c. 1907), N. Morris Department Store / Bryd Balm Company (c. 1912), Franklin County Courthouse (1909), Franklin County Jail (1938), Franklin County Library (1940), Rocky Mount Municipal Building (1929), and a Lustron house known as the Davis House (1949). Located in the district and separately listed are the Woods-Meade House and the Greer House.

It was listed on the National Register of Historic Places in 1999, with a boundary increase in 2008.

== Gallery ==
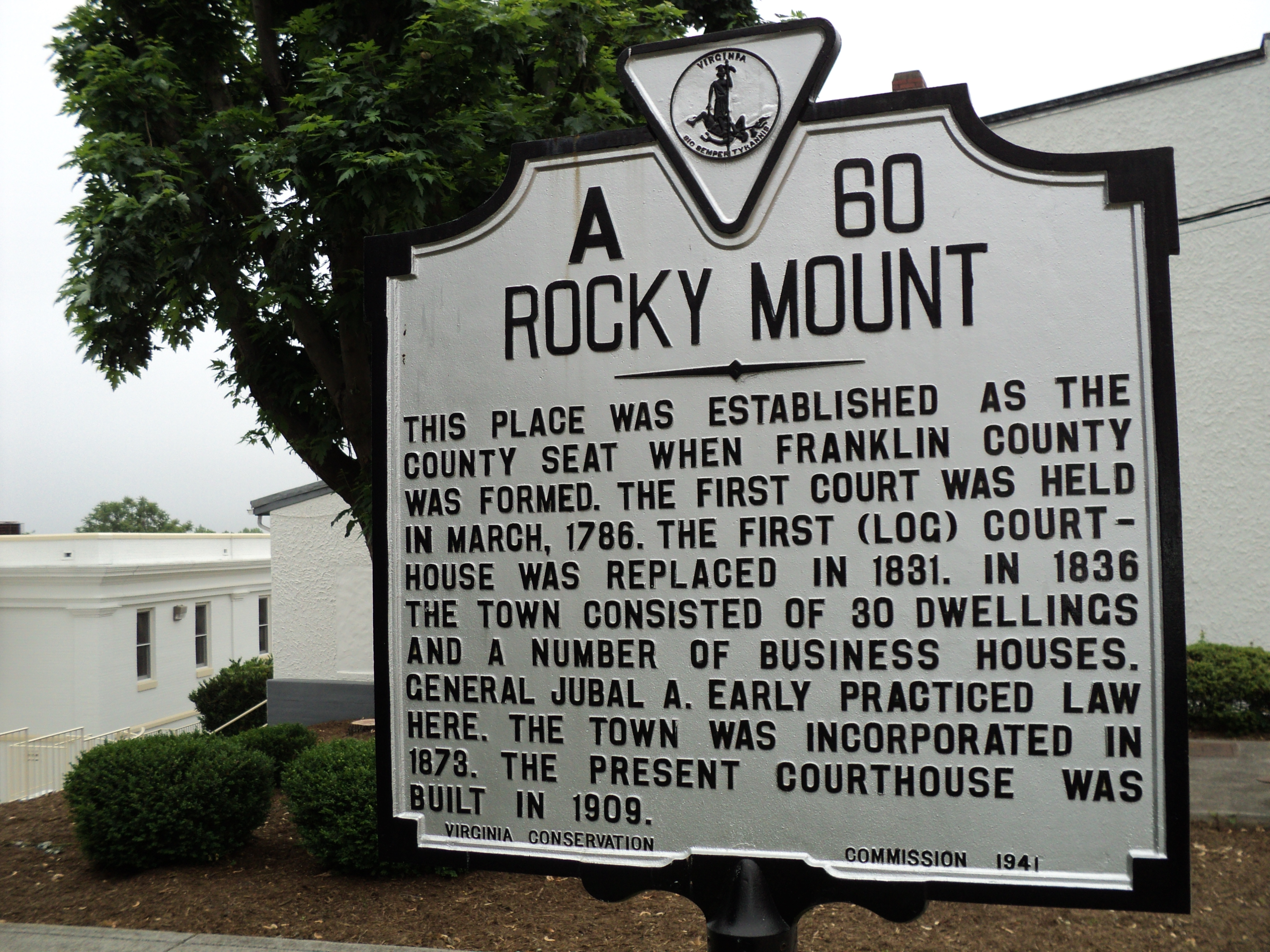
Rocky Mount Virginia state historical marker, May 2010
