= Johns Run (Sandy Creek tributary) =

Stream in Virginia, USA

Johns Run Tributary to Sandy Creek
- Location of Johns Run mouth Johns Run (Sandy Creek tributary) (the United States)

Location
- Country: United States
- State: Virginia
- Counties: Pittsylvania; Halifax

Physical characteristics
- Source: Elkhorn Creek divide
  - location: about 0.25 south of Lucks, Virginia
  - coordinates: 36°48′30″N 079°13′07″W
  - elevation: 590 ft (180 m)
- Mouth
  - location: about 1 miles northeast of Henrys Mill, Virginia
  - coordinates: 36°47′09″N 079°08′42″W
  - elevation: 458 ft (140 m)
- Length: 5.06 mi (8.14 km)
- Basin size: 4.87 square miles (12.6 km^{2})
- Discharge
  - location: Sandy Creek
  - average: 11.86 cu ft/s (0.336 m^{3}/s) at mouth with Sandy Creek

Basin features
- Progression: Sandy Creek → Banister River → Dan River → Roanoke River → Albemarle Sound → Pamlico Sound → Atlantic Ocean
- River system: Roanoke River
- Tributaries
  - left: unnamed tributaries
  - right: unnamed tributaries
- Bridges: Pickaway Road, Dabney House Road, Johns Run Road

Johns Run is a 5.06 mi (8.14 km) long 2nd order tributary to Sandy Creek in Halifax County, Virginia.

== Course ==
Johns Run rises about 0.25 miles south of Lucks, Virginia in Pittsylvania County and then flows southeast to join Sandy Creek about 1 mile northeast of Henrys Mill.

== Watershed ==
Johns Run drains 9.42 square miles (24.4 km^{2}) of area, receives about 45.6 in/year of precipitation, has a wetness index of 387.23, and is about 66% forested.

== See also ==
- List of Virginia Rivers
