= Benjamin Lankford =

American planter, patriot and politician

Member of the Virginia House of Delegates for Pittsylvania County
- In office May 5, 1783 – September 1791 Serving with Matthew Clay, William Dix, William Harrison, William Lynch, Constant Perkins,
- Preceded by: John Wilson
- Succeeded by: Thomas Tunstall
- In office May 3, 1779 – January 1782 Serving with Haynes Morgan, Thomas Terry, John Wilson
- Preceded by: Abraham Shelton
- Succeeded by: John Wilson
- In office October 7, 1776 – 1790 Serving with Robert Williams
- Preceded by: position established
- Succeeded by: Abraham Shelton

Member of the Virginia House of Burgesses for Pittsylvania County
- In office 1775–1776 Serving with Peter Perkins
- Preceded by: John Donelson
- Succeeded by: position abolished

Personal details
- Born: Benjamin Lankford; 1727 Louisa County, Colony of Virginia
- Died: August 12, 1810 (aged 83) Pittsylvania County, Virginia, U.S.
- Spouse(s): Winifred; Henrietta Bowcock Booker
- Children: 3 sons, 7 daughters

Military service
- Allegiance: United States
- Branch/service: Virginia militia
- Rank: colonel
- Battles/wars: American Revolutionary War

Benjamin Lankford (1727 – August 12, 1810)(sometimes spelled "Langford") was an American patriot, planter and politician who represented Pittsylvania County, Virginia during the final session of the House of Burgesses, several of the Virginia Revolutionary Conventions and in the Virginia House of Delegates most years until 1790. Lankford was also one of the captains of Pittsylvania's militia during the American Revolutionary War, although his service mostly involved procuring supplies. Complicating matters, another man of the same name, Benjamin Lankford (1798–1886), but whose family had lived in tidewater Somerset County, Maryland for two centuries, served in the Maryland General Assembly beginning in the 1840s through the 1876, first as a Whig, then as a Republican.

== Early life ==
Benjamin Lankford may have been born in Louisa County, from parents who moved westward from Tidewater Gloucester County to Caroline County and finally somewhat south to Louisa County. He may have had a dozen brothers and sisters.

== Career ==
Lankford continued moving south along the frontier when he came of age, possibly because his parents' debts exceeded their assets when they died, or would be insufficient to raise younger siblings. Upon creation of Pittsylvania County from then-vast Halifax County in 1767, Lankford was elected the new county's first sheriff, as well as one of the justices of the peace who jointly governed the county. In the first tax list for Pittsylvania, in 1767, Lankford paid taxes on Moll, an enslaved woman. Two decades later, in the 1787 Virginia tax census, Lankford paid taxes in Pittsylvania County for owning seven enslaved teenaged Blacks and two Black adults, as well as four horses and 14 cattle, and was the only taxpayer in the county with that surname. Neither Thomas Lankford in that census owned slaves, nor lived nearby, although possible relative Nicholas Lankford of Caroline County owned two enslaved Black adults and two teenagers, in addition to three horses and seven cattle.

When relations with Britain grew tense, Lankford became captain of a militia company (one of 27 Pittsylvania captains during the conflict), as well as joined the local Committee of Safety (among 31 members), and continued as justice of the peace. In 1777, when Robert Williams resigned as colonel of the county militia and was replaced by John Wilson, Lankford was promoted to major. When John Donelson announced his resignation and plans to move to Tennessee in 1779, John Wilson succeeded him as county Lieutenant and Lankford became the militia's colonel.

Pittsylvania voters elected Lankford and fellow militia captain Peter Perkins as their representatives to what proved to be the final session of the House of Burgesses, which began in 1775. Those men, and the veteran planter politicians they had replaced as burgesses (Hugh Innes who was creating Henry County, and John Donelson who was county lieutenant but planned to move to Tennessee) represented Pittsylvania during the first revolutionary convention, then Lankford and Perkins represented the county at most later conventions. Scholars noted that no documentation exists that either Lankford nor Perkins was actually present at the third convention and Robert Williams (who served many years as Pittsylvania's commonwealth attorney and militia colonel and succeeded Donelson as county lieutenant) replaced Perkins at the fifth convention. When Virginia declared her independence and the Virginia House of Delegates replaced the burgesses (though still a part-time position), Lankford would be elected and re-elected until 1790, albeit with gaps, serving first alongside Robert Williams, then after the pair was temporarily replaced by Abraham Shelton and Peter Perkins in 1777–1778, again served alongside John Wilson in 1779, Thomas Terry in 1780 and attorney Haynes Morgan in 1781. With another gap in 1782, Lankford served alongside William Dix in 1783 and 1784, then alongside William Harrison in 1785, Constant Perkins in 1786, William Lynch in 1787 and 1788, again with William Dix in 1789 and finally with future congressman Matthew Clay in 1790 before being replaced by Thomas Tunstall, clerk of the court.

== Personal life ==
Lankford married twice. His first wife was named Winifred, and bore two sons and six daughters before her death. After her death, Lankford remarried on January 1, 1777, in Halifax, to a widow with three young children, Mrs. Henrietta (Bowcock) Booker, widow of Edward Booker, who bore another son and daughter. One of his sons, Thomas Lankford, was murdered on a trip to Kentucky to visit the Todd family; neither of Lankford's other two sons married.

== Death and legacy ==
Lankford died in Pittsylvania County in 1810, and was probably buried in the county. His will was admitted to probate the next year. It named seven children, but the Lankford surname ceased in Pittsylvania county, his daughters having married into the Todd, Madison, Browne and Turner families.
