= Bar Branch (Sandy Creek tributary) =

Stream in Virginia, USA

Bar Branch Tributary to Sandy Creek
- Location of Bar Branch mouth Bar Branch (Sandy Creek tributary) (the United States)

Location
- Country: United States
- State: Virginia
- County: Pittsylvania

Physical characteristics
- Source: unnamed tributary to Birch Creek divide
  - location: about 2 miles west of Red Oak Hollow, Virginia
  - coordinates: 36°43′36″N 079°13′07″W
  - elevation: 650 ft (200 m)
- Mouth
  - location: about 1 mile southwest of Pickaway, Virginia
  - coordinates: 36°45′48″N 079°11′50″W
  - elevation: 479 ft (146 m)
- Length: 3.36 mi (5.41 km)
- Basin size: 3.41 square miles (8.8 km^{2})
- Discharge
  - location: Sandy Creek
  - average: 4.47 cu ft/s (0.127 m^{3}/s) at mouth with Sandy Creek

Basin features
- Progression: Sandy Creek → Banister River → Dan River → Roanoke River → Albemarle Sound → Pamlico Sound → Atlantic Ocean
- River system: Roanoke River
- Tributaries
  - left: unnamed tributaries
  - right: unnamed tributaries
- Bridges: Bair Branch Road

Bar Branch is a 3.36 mi (5.41 km) long 1st order tributary to Sandy Creek in Pittsylvania County, Virginia.

== Course ==
Bar Branch rises about 2 miles west of Red Oak Hollow, Virginia in Pittsylvania County and then flows northeast to join Sandy Creek about 1 mile southwest of Pickaway.

== Watershed ==
Bar Branch drains 3.41 square miles (8.8 km^{2}) of area, receives about 45.3 in/year of precipitation, has a wetness index of 347.97, and is about 53% forested.

== See also ==
- List of Virginia Rivers
