= Hugh Innes =

Hugh Innes may refer to:

- Hugh Innes (burgess) (1729–1797), Virginia lawyer, legislator and patriot
- Sir Hugh Innes, 1st Baronet (c. 1764–1831), British Member of Parliament
- Hugh Paterson Innes (1870–1931), Ontario lawyer, judge and political figure
