= Washington Iron Furnace =

- U.S. National Register of Historic Places
- Virginia Landmarks Register
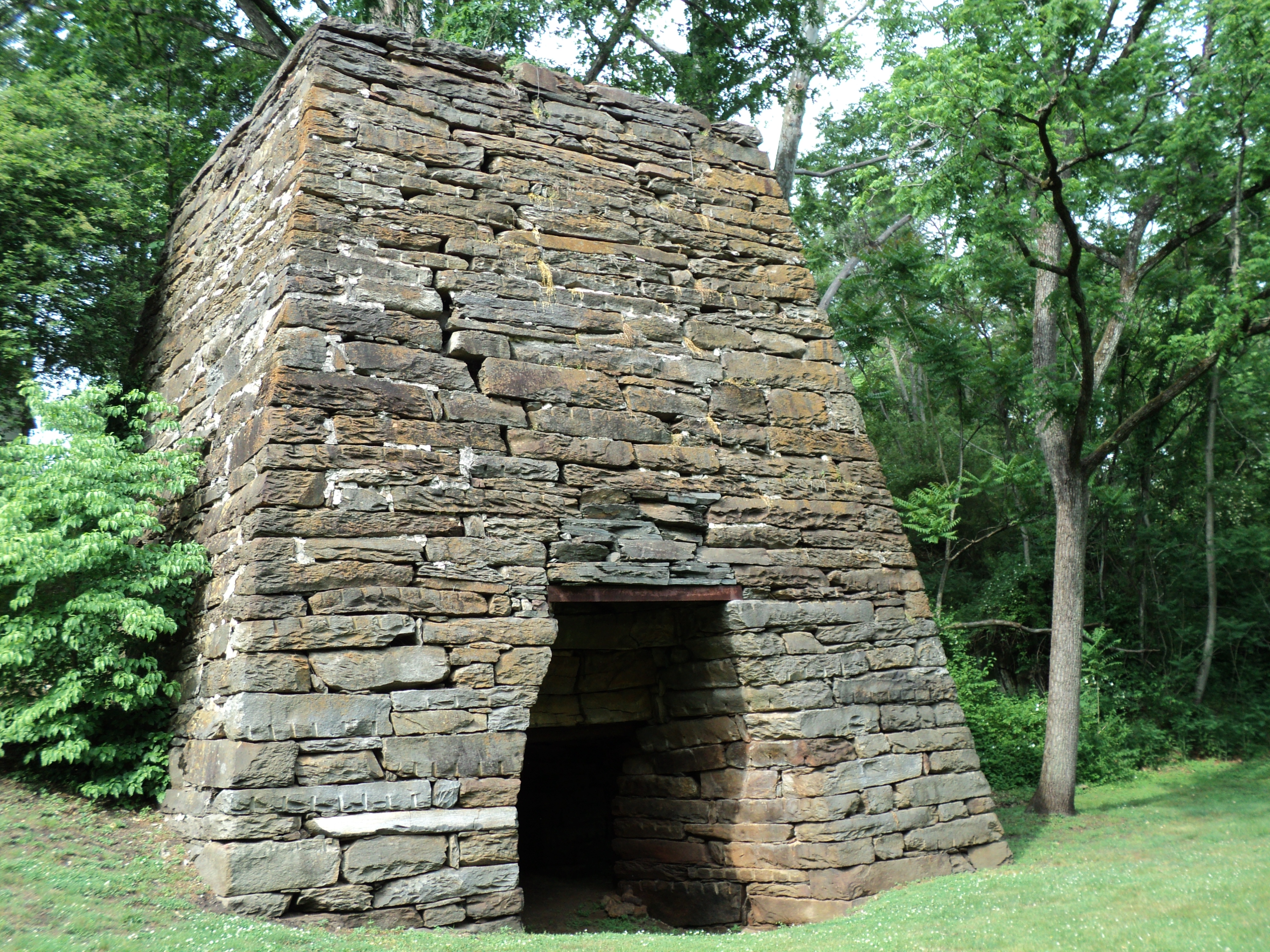
- Exterior view Washington Iron Furnace

- Location within Virginia Location within the United States
- Location: 108 Old Furnace Rd., Rocky Mount, Virginia
- Coordinates: 36°59′13″N 79°53′31″W
- Area: 9.9 acres (4.0 ha)
- Built: c. 1770
- NRHP reference No.: 73002014
- VLR No.: 157-0029

Significant dates
- Added to NRHP: March 20, 1973
- Designated VLR: October 17, 1972

Washington Iron Furnace is a historic iron furnace, located in Rocky Mount, Franklin County, Virginia. The granite furnace was built around 1770, and measures 30 feet high on its south face. It helped establish industry in the county, and was listed on the National Register of Historic Places in 1973.

Considered one of the best preserved furnaces in Virginia, it was built against the side of a hill so that iron ore, charcoal and limestone could be transported to the site by wagon along the ridge and dumped into the top of the furnace. The original cart road and ten-yard-long bridge leading to the top no longer exists.

== History ==
John Donelson and his son-in-law, John Caffery, built the furnace circa 1770 and operated it for about a decade. In 1773, four white men and six enslaved African Americans carted the raw materials, stoked the fires, and otherwise worked the furnace.

Franklin County was not organized until 1785, from parts of Bedford and Henry counties (the latter was split from Pittsylvania in 1777). Donelson served on what was then the first court for Pittsylvania County. He also represented it in the House of Burgesses, and was its militia colonel and county surveyor. The ironworks, originally called "The Bloomery", supplied Patriot forces during the American Revolutionary War. The surviving ironmaster's house later became known as The Farm.

In 1779 Donelson sold the Bloomery to fellow former Burgess James Callaway (1736-1809) and his father-in-law Jeremiah Early (1730-1779, who were both of Bedford County, Virginia. Donelson and his family moved to Tennessee, where his daughter Rachel Donelson met and married Andrew Jackson, a future United States president.

Callaway and Early named the ironworks "Washington Iron Forge" to honor George Washington. Calloway also owned Oxford furnace in Campbell County, Virginia with Henry Innes, and the Chiswell lead mines further southwest. Early soon died and bequeathed his share of the ironworks to three of his sons, two of whom also soon died. The survivor John Early sold his share to Calloway in 1781.

In 1820, the three Saunders brothers (one of whom had married a daughter of Jeremiah Early) purchased this and another furnace on Ferrum Creek from Callaway's heirs. By 1836 the Washington mine and furnace employed 100 men, and produced 160 tons of iron annually.

A nearby vein of high quality magnetite supplied this furnace. Horse-drawn wagons took the refined iron bars and castings down the Carolina Road to North Carolina and Alabama. Reportedly in 1850, a dam burst on Furnace Creek uphill of the furnace; the resulting water flow cracked the hot furnace, which was not rebuilt by the Saunders family. It was repaired and operated again about the time of the Civil War. The mine continued operations until 1880; the Pigg River Mining Company shipped ore from there to Pennsylvania until costs proved too high. The last shafts went 75 feet below the surface and soon filled with water.
