= Judge Innes =

Judge Innes may refer to:

- James Rose Innes (1855–1942), Chief Justice of the Union of South Africa
- Harry Innes (1752–1816), first United States federal judge in Kentucky
