= Daniel Hill =

Daniel Hill or Dan Hill may refer to:

- Daniel Harvey Hill (1821–1889), American Confederate general in the Civil War
- Daniel Harvey Hill Jr. (1859–1924), American educator and the third chancellor of North Carolina State University, son of Daniel Harvey Hill
- Dan Hill (American football) (1917–1989), American football player
- Daniel G. Hill (1923–2003), Canadian sociologist, civil servant, human rights specialist and Black Canadian historian
- Dan Hill (Daniel Grafton "Dan" Hill IV, born 1954), Canadian singer/songwriter
  - Dan Hill (1975 album), the 1975 album by Dan Hill
  - Dan Hill (1987 album), the 1987 album by Dan Hill
- Daniel Hill (actor) (born 1956), British actor
- Dan Hill (rugby league) (born 2002), British rugby player
- Daniel Hill (running back) (born 2005), American football player

== See also ==
- Daniel's Hill Historic District, a national historic district located in Lynchburg, Virginia
- Dan's Hill, a historic home located near Danville in Pittsylvania County, Virginia
- Danny Hill (disambiguation)
