= John Early (Virginia politician) =

American planter, officer and politician (1757–1804)

Member of the Virginia House of Delegates from Franklin County
- In office October 18, 1790 – October 20, 1793 Serving with Joshua Rentfro, Ashford Napier, Swinfield Hill
- Preceded by: Samuel Hairston
- Succeeded by: Moses Greer
- In office October 16, 1786 – October 18, 1789 Serving with John Rentfro, Thomas Arthur, Joshua Rentfro
- Preceded by: position created
- Succeeded by: Samuel Hairston

Personal details
- Born: September 15, 1757 Bedford County, Colony of Virginia
- Died: July, 1804 Franklin County, Virginia
- Spouse: Elizabeth Cheatham
- Children: 4 sons, 3 daughters
- Parents: Jeremiah Early (father); Sarah Anderson (mother)
- Occupation: military officer, farmer, politician

Military service
- Allegiance: United States
- Branch/service: Virginia Militia

John Early (September 15, 1757—July __, 1804) was a Virginia military officer, planter, businessman and politician who served six terms in the Virginia House of Delegates representing Franklin County, which he also represented in the Virginia Ratifying Convention of 1788, during which he voted against ratification of the U.S. Constitution.

== Early and family life ==
The son of Jeremiah Early (1730- 1779) and his wife, the former Sarah Anderson (d. 1770), he had at least two brothers (Joseph and Jubal) and two sisters. Virginia not having public schools in this era, he received a private education appropriate for his class.

Early married Elizabeth Cheatham in 1792 and they had four sons (of whom Samuel, Jubal and Melchizedech reached adulthood and were mentioned in his will), and three daughters.

== Planter and businessman ==
Shortly before Jeremiah Early died in 1779, he and his son-in-law (this man's brother-in-law) James Callaway (1736-1809)(a burgess and militia colonel who operated Oxford ironworks in nearby Campbell County, as well as the Chiswell lead mine to the southwest in what became Wythe County) purchased an ironworks from John Donelson who moved to Tennessee. The new owners renamed it Washington Iron Forge to honor the Patriot Commander-in-chief. Jeremiah Early bequeathed his share to this man and his two brothers. Although John Early soon sold his share to James Callaway, soon his brother Joseph died and bequeathed his share to his two remaining brothers, then Jubal Early died by 1793 (leaving his share to his infant sons Joab and Henry, for whom Col. Samuel Hairston became guardian. While John Early never operated the forge (which used enslaved labor), he retained that 1/6th ownership interest for the rest of his life.

By 1782, Early owned 950 acres of land in the part of Bedford County which became Franklin County, and in 1791 bought 650 acres in Henry County. He operated both plantations using enslaved labor, also hiring an overseer for the Henry County farm. Early owned 2,773 acres in Franklin County by the time of his death, and another 1,242½ acres jointly with a brother. He also held at least thirty-four slaves at the time of his death. Furthermore, his will acknowledged that one woman he acquired in 1781 was freeborn and explicitly named and freed her six children.

== Militia officer ==
His participation in the Revolutionary War is unclear because of the common name in the family, though the Washington Iron Forge clearly assisted the patriot cause. This John Early clearly became a lieutenant in the Bedford County militia in 1783 and a captain the following year. Upon the creation of Franklin County in 1785, he retained that captain's rank. In August 1793, he was promoted to lieutenant colonel commandant, and held that rank at the time of his death.

== Politician ==
Franklin County voters first elected Early as one of their two first (part time) representatives in the Virginia House of Delegates (in 1786), then re-elected him twice, but planter Col. Samuel Hairston replaced him alongside Joshua Rentfro for the 1789 session. John Early was again elected in 1790 and again re-elected him twice. He served alongside five different men. Early was also a presidential elector in 1792, when George Washington was unanimously re-elected President.

During his first set of legislative terms, Early became one of the justices of the peace who jointly governed Franklin County in that era. He took that oath of office in February 1789 and attended meetings regularly until November 1802. Nonetheless, he received a commission as sheriff (a coveted post since which also involved tax collection and received a commission) in July 1803.

Meanwhile, Franklin County voters elected Early and Thomas Arthur as their representatives to the Virginia Ratifying Convention in 1788. Both men (perhaps following the lead of Patrick Henry) voted (unsuccessfully) against adoption of the federal Constitution. A cousin, Joel Early, represented Culpeper County in that convention and also unsuccessfully voted against adoption. That narrow adoption vote may have led James Madison to draft the Bill of Rights pursuant to an earlier document drafted by another prominent anti-Federalist, George Mason, the Virginia Declaration of Rights.

In December 1790, Early was one of the trustees charged with extending navigability of the Roanoke River to the forks of the Dan and Staunton Rivers. He also was a trustee of the short-lived town of Wisenburgh, one of two Franklin County towns which the legislature incorporated in 1792 (this one on land donated by Moses Grier).

== Death and legacy ==
Early died in early July 1804, although the exact date remains unknown, as is his final resting place in Franklin County. By the 1830s, the Washington Iron Furnace was operated by three Saunders brothers, one of whom had married a daughter of Jeremiah Early, but a flood in 1851 nearly destroyed it and it was not rebuilt. The ruins were placed on the National Register of Historic Places in 1973.
