= Pine Creek (Sandy Creek tributary) =

Stream in Virginia, USA

Pine Creek Tributary to Sandy Creek
- Location of Pine Creek mouth Pine Creek (Sandy Creek tributary) (the United States)

Location
- Country: United States
- State: Virginia
- County: Pittsylvania

Physical characteristics
- Source: unnamed tributary to Gunther Branch divide
  - location: about 1 mile northeast of Keeling, Virginia
  - coordinates: 36°43′45″N 079°16′20″W
  - elevation: 640 ft (200 m)
- Mouth
  - location: about 2 miles east of Dodson Corners, Virginia
  - coordinates: 36°45′55″N 079°14′40″W
  - elevation: 487 ft (148 m)
- Length: 2.73 mi (4.39 km)
- Basin size: 3.05 square miles (7.9 km^{2})
- Discharge
  - location: Sandy Creek
  - average: 4.05 cu ft/s (0.115 m^{3}/s) at mouth with Sandy Creek

Basin features
- Progression: Sandy Creek → Banister River → Dan River → Roanoke River → Albemarle Sound → Pamlico Sound → Atlantic Ocean
- River system: Roanoke River
- Tributaries
  - left: unnamed tributaries
  - right: unnamed tributaries
- Bridges: Dodson Road

Pine Creek is a 2.73 mi (4.39 km) long 2nd order tributary to Sandy Creek in Pittsylvania County, Virginia.

== Course ==
Pine Creek rises about 1 mile east of Dodson Corners, Virginia in Pittsylvania County and then flows north-northeast to join Sandy Creek about 1 mile northeast of Keeling.

== Watershed ==
Pine Creek drains 3.05 square miles (7.9 km^{2}) of area, receives about 45.6 in/year of precipitation, has a wetness index of 376.86, and is about 52% forested.

== See also ==
- List of Virginia Rivers
