= Robert Williams (Virginia politician) =

American planter, patriot and politician

Member of the Virginia House of Delegates for Pittsylvania County
- In office October 7, 1776 – December 1776 Serving with Benjamin Lankford
- Preceded by: position established
- Succeeded by: Abraham Shelton

Personal details
- Born: circa 1740 Hanover County, Colony of Virginia
- Died: circa 1793
- Spouse: Sarah Lanier

Military service
- Allegiance: United States
- Branch/service: Virginia Militia
- Rank: county lieutenant
- Battles/wars: American Revolutionary War

Robert Williams (circa 1740 – circa 1793) was an American lawyer, patriot, planter and politician in Virginia and North Carolina, who served in the fifth Virginia Revolutionary Convention, first meeting of the Virginia House of Delegates in 1776 and in 1788 the Virginia Ratifying Convention, all representing Pittsylvania County, as well as led Pittsylvania's militia during the American Revolutionary War.

== Early life and education ==
Because Williams was not born among the First Families of Virginia, little documentation exists as to his birth or education. Genealogists searching for his antecedents seem to agree that he was born in Hanover County, Virginia in the early 1740s, but disagree as to his parents, especially since many families moved from Hanover County south to the developing and newly surveyed frontier along the Dan River between the Virginia Colony and the North Carolina colony. Thus his father may have been Daniel Williams, Nathaniel Williams (who had several sons who held military or political office in North Carolina) or Charlie A Williams. The Williams family would remain politically active in North Carolina, Tennessee and Mississippi as the 19th century began, but vanished from Pittsylvania county. When this man was a boy, the Virginia side was part of vast Halifax County, Virginia and the North Carolina side was then-vast Orange County, North Carolina. In the modern era (as well as at the end of this man's life), the 214-mile long Dan River begins in Patrick County, Virginia, crosses into Stokes County, North Carolina and Rockingham County, North Carolina before becoming at times the dividing line between Caswell County, North Carolina and Pittsylvania County, Virginia and later Halifax County, Virginia and joining the Roanoke River near a dam which forms Kerr Reservoir, the largest lake in Virginia, and which borders Halifax, Charlotte and Mecklenburg counties in Virginia, as well as Vance, Granville and Warren Counties in North Carolina, and ultimately drains into the Atlantic Ocean in North Carolina.

== Personal life ==
Robert Williams and his brother Col. Joseph Williams lived across the border in North Carolina before the revolutionary war, and both married Lanier sisters, daughters of Thomas Lanier of Granville County, North Carolina, with Robert marrying Sarah Lanier (1748–1814) and Joseph marrying Rebekah Lanier. Joseph Williams died in 1774 while his only child, daughter Mary was under age, so this uncle became her guardian, which guardianship ended on June 15, 1789, because she married future Virginia congressman Matthew Clay. Col. Joseph Williams had a significant estate, with both real estate and more than a dozen enslaved people, and apparently Matthew Clay was disappointed in whatever documents concerning the guardianship which this man's widow (and her attorney Haynes Morgan, who had served as delegate in 1781) provided to him concerning that guardianship. Sarah Lanier Williams remarried after her husband's death, but disagreement also exists as to her second husband's identity, although her gravestone remains in Caswell County, North Carolina.

== Career ==
This Robert Williams was clearly a lawyer in Virginia around the time of the American Revolutionary War. In fact, in addition to his patriotic activities described below, he was the Commonwealth attorney (prosecutor) for Pittsylvania County, and later for Patrick Henry County when it was formed in 1777, and still later the first commonwealth attorney for Franklin County after it was formed in 1786. In that era, because of limited court sessions, one man could serve as prosecutor for more than one county, since residence was not required, provided the locations of the court sessions were close enough.

Around the time of the Revolutionary War, Williams owned a plantation in Halifax or Pittsylvania County along Sandy Creek, a tributary of the Banister River, which flowed into the Dan River. There he also farmed tobacco using enslaved labor. In the 1787 Virginia tax census, Robert Williams lived in and paid taxes in Pittsylvania county for two white overseers as well as 21 enslaved teenagers, 32 enslaved adults, 22 horses and 88 cattle.

Pittsylvania voters elected Williams as one of their delegates to the fifth (last) Virginia Revolutionary Convention, and the following year to the first session of the Virginia House of Delegates. During the conflict, Williams continued to serve as commonwealth attorney (prosecutor) for Pittsylvania County, as well as officer in the local militia. In 1775, he held the rank of colonel in the county militia, and was promoted to Pittsylvania county lieutenant in 1778 when the former burgess and county lieutenant John Donelson announced he was leaving for Tennessee. In that era the county lieutenant was essentially the county's highest executive office, and so controlled the militia and was responsible for obtaining provisions for them as well as the Continental Army. Williams served in that position for about a year, as well as provided more supplies for that militia and Continental troops than anyone else in the county.

In 1788, Pittsylvania voters elected Wilson and Williams as their representatives to the Virginia Ratifying Convention. Both men (perhaps following the lead of the original Pittsylvania County's other leading man (until the split-off of Patrick Henry County, Virginia, Patrick Henry) voted (unsuccessfully) against adoption of the federal Constitution. That narrow adoption vote may have led James Madison to draft the Bill of Rights pursuant to an earlier document drafted by another prominent anti-Federalist, George Mason, the Virginia Declaration of Rights.

Although no Robert Williams is listed as a landowner in now-published Caswell County real estate title books, Robert Williams(b. 1773) successfully ran for Congress from a district which included Caswell County, North Carolina in 1796.

== Death and legacy ==
According to a lawsuit filed by his former ward Mary and her husband Matthew Clay before November 1793 against this man's widow Sarah, this Robert Williams died intestate (without a will), but with several children under the legal age of 21 years who are named as Elizabeth, Nathaniel, Sarah, Patsey and Francis). Pittsylvania lawyer and politician Haynes Morgan represented the widow. Partly because of his common name, and unindexed handwritten records, genealogists disagree as to the date and location of this Williams' death. Clearly, the Williams family left Pittsylvania county by the early 19th century, and no Robert Williamses appear in the United States Census for 1800, in either Caswell County, North Carolina nor Pittsylvania County, Virginia. Pittsylvania historian Frences Hurt believed Williams died in Caswell County, North Carolina in 1790 (as does the unattributed annotation in his findagrave entry), but he continued to figure as a witness in now-published Pittsylvania records for several years, No parents are listed for brother North Carolina congressmen Robert Williams (b.1773) and Lewis Williams (b. 1783), although both were supposedly born in Surry County, North Carolina which adjoins Patrick County Virginia and the former's mother supposedly died in 1814 (this year of this man's widow's death) and both may be brothers of John Williams (b.1778) whose mother was Rebekah Lanier. Hurt only specifically denied knowledge of this man's relationship with Henry Williams of Peytonsburg (then the Pittsylvania county seat) who also served on Pittsylvania's Committee of Safety in 1775 and as a militia captain. That Henry Williams also once advertised for a runaway indentured servant and schoolteacher with the same Williams surname. Henry Williams was a prominent landowner in Caswell County, North Carolina. The 1790 date appears too early, although it also appears in the unattributed printed genealogy attached to Sarah Lanier's findagrave entry states that the estate of this Robert Williams was admitted to probate in Pittsylvania County in 1799.
