= Cleveland Hall (Nashville, Tennessee) =

Antebellum mansion in Tennessee, US

- U.S. National Register of Historic Places
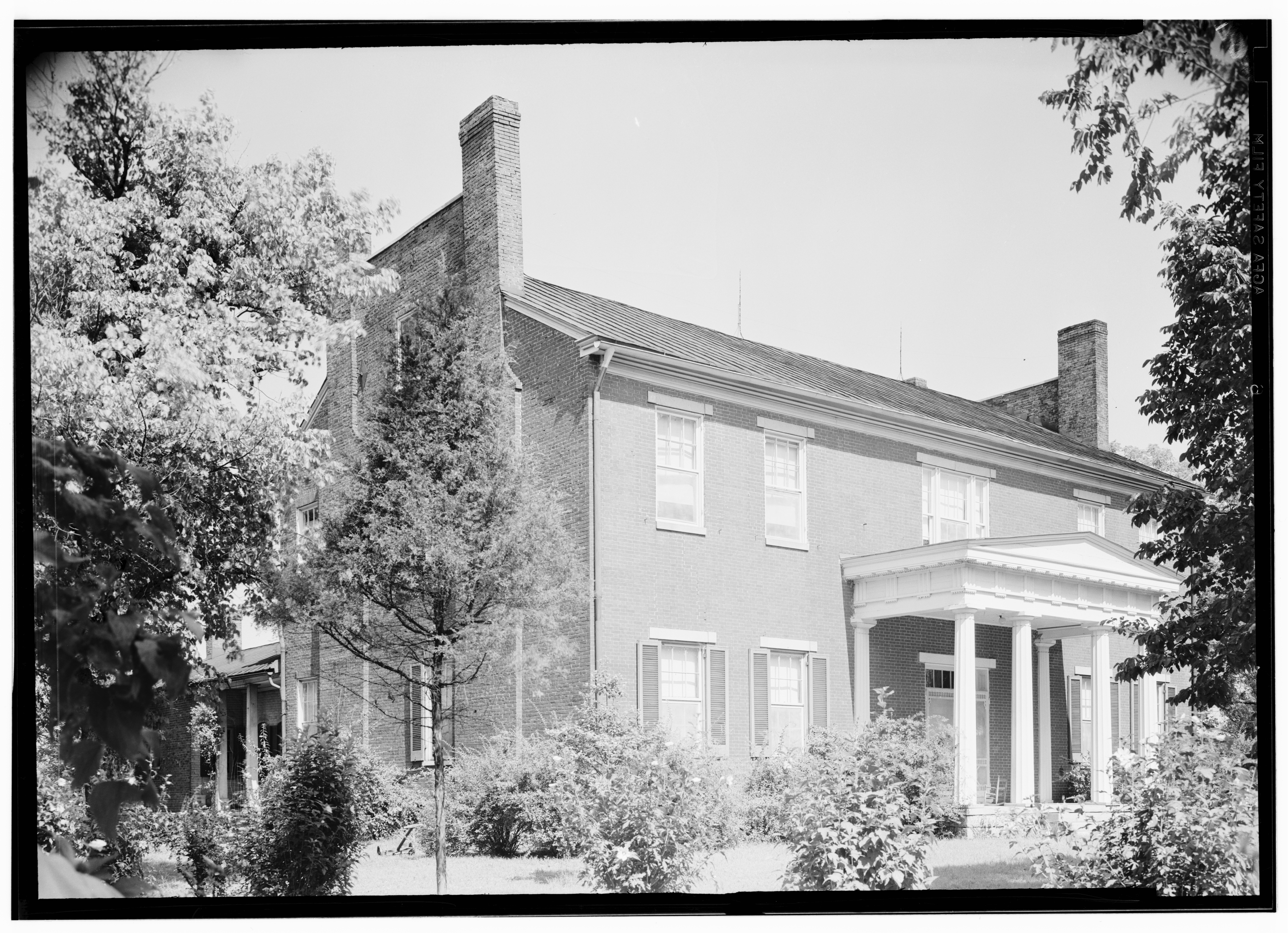
- The house in 1940

- Location within Tennessee Location within the United States
- Location: 4041 Old Hickory Blvd., Old Hickory, Tennessee
- Coordinates: 36°13′46″N 86°37′35″W
- Built: 1839
- Architect: Joseph Reiff; William C. Hume
- Architectural style: Greek Revival
- NRHP reference No.: 71000821
- Added to NRHP: April 16, 1971

Cleveland Hall is an Antebellum mansion in Nashville, Tennessee.

== Location ==
It is located at 4041 Old Hickory Boulevard in Nashville, Davidson County, Tennessee, United States.

== History ==
It was designed by master builders Joseph Reiff and William C. Hume, who built The Hermitage in 1835, constructed under the supervision of owner, Stockly Donelson, and completed in 1839. Its main massing resembles the plantation plain style Plantation Plain-style, but the pediment and columns on the entrance, which could have been added at a later time are markers of the Greek Revival style. It has eighteen rooms.

It was the home of Stockly Donelson (1805–1888), who was Rachel Jackson's nephew and whose grandfather was John Donelson (1718–1785), and his wife Phila Ann Lawrence Donelson. After his death, their son William Stockly Donelson (1835–1895) lived in the house with his wife, Alice Ewin Donelson (1836–1881). Subsequently, it was home to their son, John Donelson (1874–1952) and his wife, Bettie Menees Hooper Donelson (1875–1963). It is still privately owned by the Donelson family.

== Heritage significance ==
It has been listed on the National Register of Historic Places since April 16, 1971.
