= Berry Hill (Berry Hill, Virginia) =

Historic house in Virginia, United States

- Berry Hill Manor
- U.S. National Register of Historic Places
- Virginia Landmarks Register
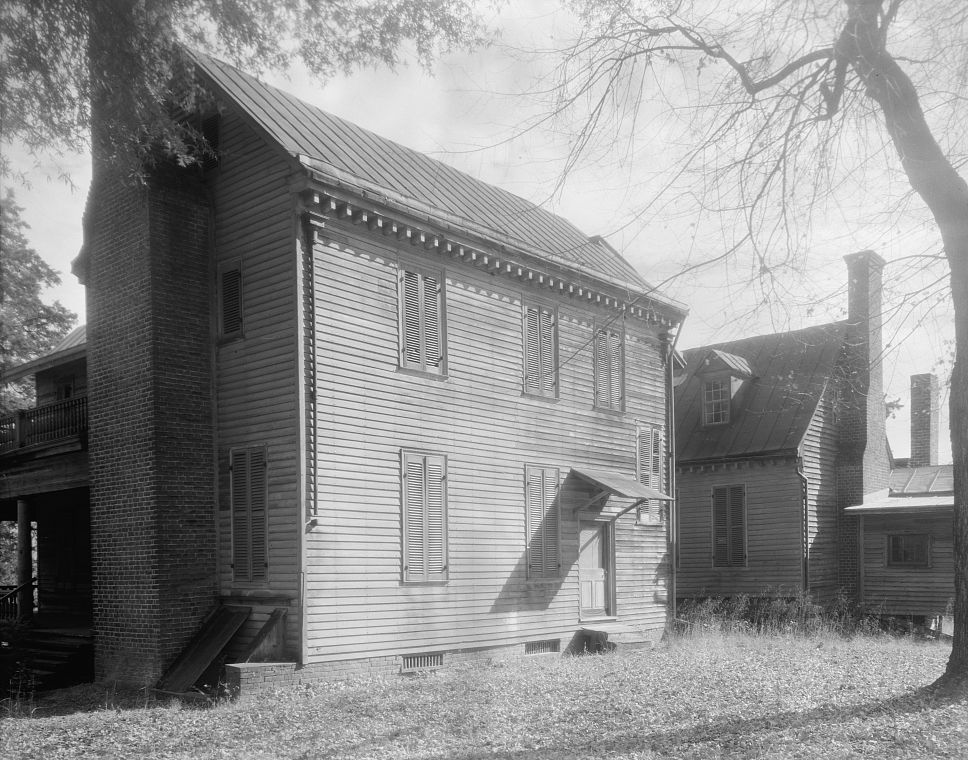
- Berry Hill, Carnegie Survey of the South, 1930s

- Location within Virginia Location within the United States
- Location: SW of Berry Hill, near Danville, Virginia
- Coordinates: 36°32′44″N 79°37′11″W
- Area: 20 acres (8.1 ha)
- Built: c. 1910
- Architectural style: Colonial Revival, Shingle Style
- NRHP reference No.: 80004210
- VLR No.: 071-0006

Significant dates
- Added to NRHP: May 6, 1980
- Designated VLR: February 15, 1977

Berry Hill is or was a historic home and farm complex located near Danville, Pittsylvania County, Virginia, United States. It was listed on the National Register of Historic Places in 1980. However, may be in the process of being delisted in connection with industrial development plans by Mega Site, the City of Danville and Pittsylvania County.

== History ==
Pioneer Nicholas Perkins acquired the land, which on his death was bequeathed to his eldest son Peter Perkins who became a planter and politician as well as important Virginia patriot during the American Revolutionary War. Perkins built a house for his bride, Agnes Wilson, daughter of pioneer surveyor and militia captain Peter Wilson, who surveyed for a road between the homestead of pioneer William Bean (who later moved to Tennessee) to the mouth of Sandy River. Perkins lived at Berry Hill and operated a ferry as well as a plantation. Perkins bequeathed the Berry Hill to his son Nicholas Perkins (Jr.), who around 1810 sold Berry Hill to his cousin Major Peter Wilson (who would lead troops in the War of 1812). However, Peter Wilson died in 1814 and by 1819 it was owned by Robert Hairston, the brother in law of Wilson's daughter, who owned it through the American Civil War. In 1881 Hairston bequeathed this plantation to his daughter Ruth Hairston, who by 1898 married Albert Varley Sims. (Ruth being a common name in the family, she was related to prominent local historian and Lost Cause advocate Ruth Hairston Early)

The main house was built in several sections during the 19th and early 20th centuries, taking its present form about 1910. Robert Varley Sims inherited it in 1966, and began the process which led it its inclusion on the Virginia landmarks register and ultimately the National Register of Historic Places.

== Architecture ==
The property consists of a house and about twenty outbuildings. The oldest section of the main house is a two-story, three-bay structure connected by a hyphen to a 1 1/2-story wing set perpendicular to the main block. Connected by a hyphen is a one-story, single-cell wing probably built in the 1840s. Enveloping the front wall and the hyphen of the original house is a large, two-story structure built about 1910 with a shallow gambrel roof with bell-cast eaves. Located on the property are a large assemblage of contributing outbuildings including the former kitchen/laundry, the "lumber shed," the smokehouse, the dairy, a small gable-roofed log cabin, a chicken house, a log slave house, log corn crib, and a log stable.
