= The Farm (Rocky Mount, Virginia) =

Historic house in Virginia, United States

- U.S. National Register of Historic Places
- Virginia Landmarks Register
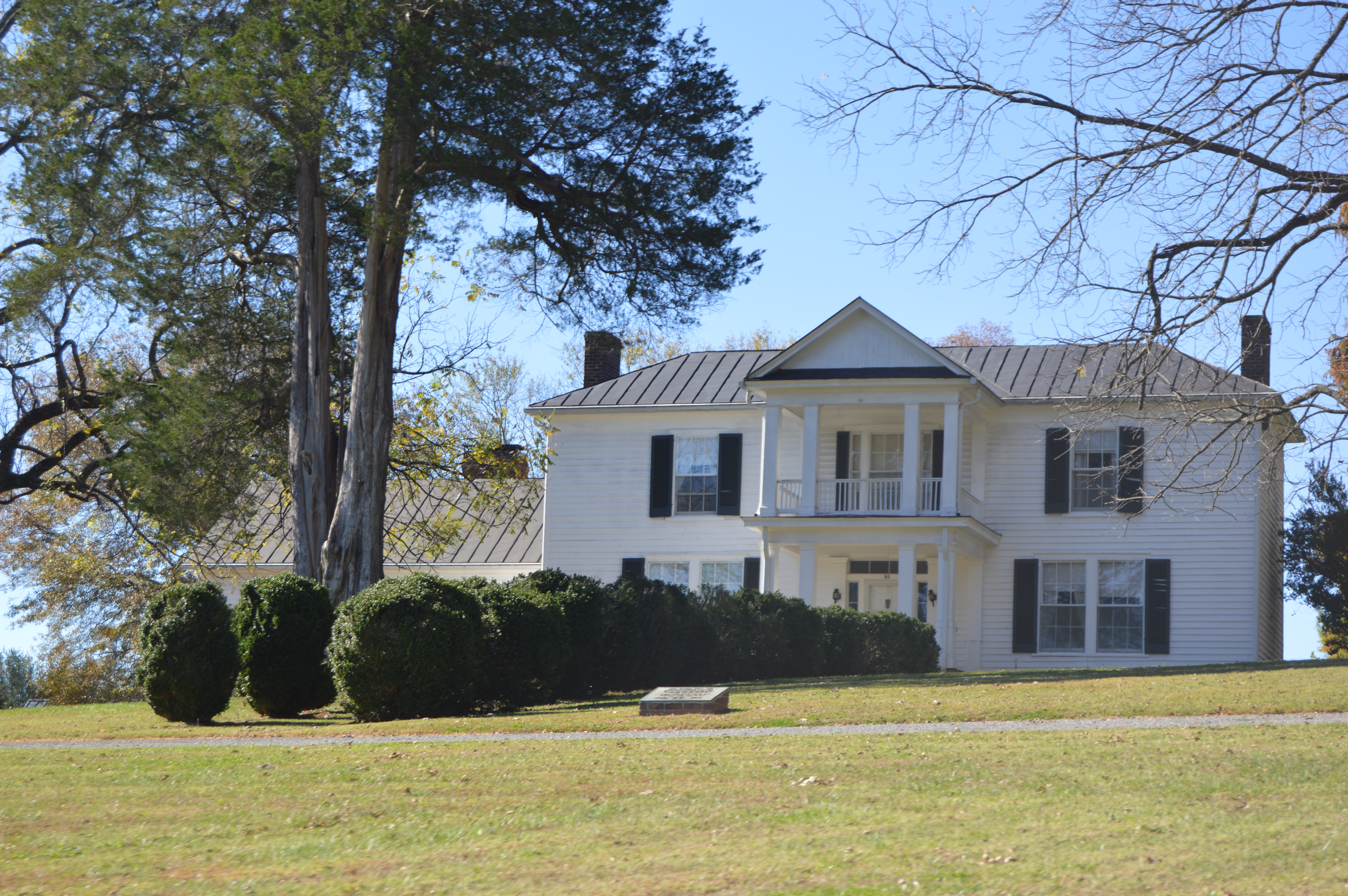
- Front of the house

- Location within Virginia Location within the United States
- Location: Lawndale Dr., Rocky Mount, Virginia
- Coordinates: 36°59′21″N 79°53′34″W
- Area: 4 acres (1.6 ha)
- Built: 1856
- Architectural style: Greek Revival
- NRHP reference No.: 89001910
- VLR No.: 157-0021

Significant dates
- Added to NRHP: November 2, 1989
- Designated VLR: February 21, 1989

The Farm is a historic home located at Rocky Mount, Franklin County, Virginia. The house was probably built during the late-18th century, expanded in the 1820s, and heavily remodeled in the Greek Revival style around 1856. It is a two-story, frame dwelling sheathed in weatherboard with a single-pile, central-passage-plan. It features a two-story, projecting front porch. Later additions were made in the late-19th and early-20th century. Also on the property are a contributing one-story brick slave quarters/summer kitchen and the site of a farm office marked by a stone chimney. The house was used as the ironmaster's house for the nearby Washington Iron Furnace.

It was listed on the National Register of Historic Places in 1989.
