= Hugh Shiell =

Irish physician

Hugh Shiell (died November 1785?) was an Irish physician who became a financier and patriot of the American Revolution.

Born in Dublin, Ireland, Shiell studied at the University of Edinburgh. He graduated with his M.D. and emigrated to Philadelphia where he opened a medical practice. By this point he had amassed a substantial fortune and became familiar with the wealthy elite of his new city; he became close friends with banker and financier of the American Revolution, Robert Morris. In 1780, Shiell invested a large sum of money in Morris’ Bank of North America, which was the first bank in the United States and which supplied the American troops with provisions. John Adams alluded to Shiell in a letter to James Lovell. James Armstrong Sr recommended him to George Washington. Through his friendship with Morris, Shiell met his wife, Ann Harris; they had one child, Catherine. Alongside his medical practice, Shiell ran a shipping business, records of which are held in the archive of the Kentucky Historical Society. He was elected as a member to the American Philosophical Society in 1781.

In 1783 or 1784, he retired from city life and relocated with his family to Lincoln County, Kentucky, where, among other activities, he operated a distillery. He died not long thereafter, attempting to cross a stream; he either drowned or caught pneumonia and died later. His widow subsequently married Harry Innes.

His name is inscribed on a plaque at the American Revolution Memorial in Danville, Kentucky. The memorial was erected "to honor and commemorate the men who fought in the American Revolution and sleep in Boyle County Kentucky."
