= Danny Hill =

Danny Hill may refer to:

- Danny Hill (footballer) (born 1974), English football midfielder
- Danny Hill (rugby league) (born 1984), English rugby league player

== See also ==
- Daniel Hill (disambiguation)
- Hill (surname)
