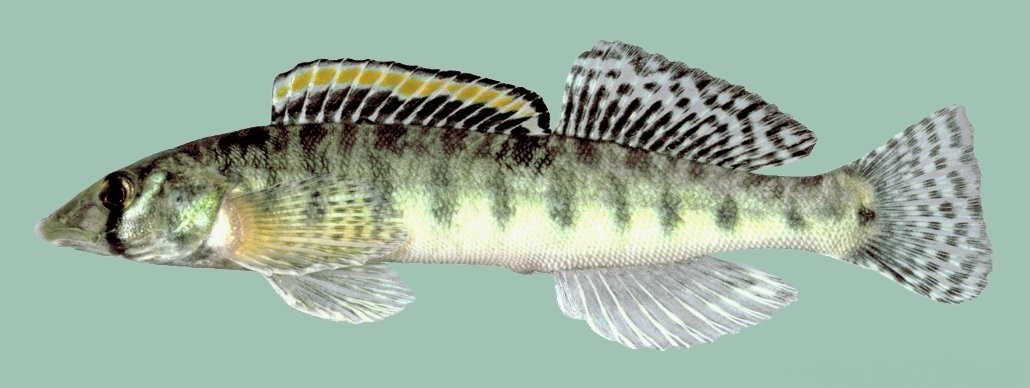

Conservation status
- Vulnerable (IUCN 3.1)

- Endangered (ESA)

Scientific classification
- Kingdom: Animalia
- Phylum: Chordata
- Class: Actinopterygii
- Order: Perciformes
- Family: Percidae
- Genus: Percina
- Species: P. rex

Binomial name
- Percina rex (Jordan & Evermann, 1889)

Synonyms
- Etheostoma rex Jordan & Evermann, 1889

= Roanoke logperch =

Species of fish

The Roanoke logperch (Percina rex) is a species of freshwater ray-finned fish, a darter from the subfamily Etheostomatinae, part of the family Percidae, which also contains the perches, ruffes and pikeperches. It is found in the Roanoke and Chowan drainages in Virginia and North Carolina in the United States. It inhabits low and moderate-gradient streams and rivers in warm, clear water in mostly unsilted gravel and rubble in runs, pools, and riffles. It is primarily insectivorous. This fish was federally delisted as an endangered species in July 2025.

== Description ==
As an adult the Roanoke logperch is between 80 and 115 millimetres (3.1 and 4.5 in) standard length, with a total length up to 140 millimetres (5.5 in). The light-colored body is somewhat stocky and elongated. There are dark, rounded, and vertically elongated blotches on the side. The fish has a long, cone-shaped snout with a bulbous or blunt tip. There are two dorsal fins, which are both very tall on adult males. The first dorsal fin has an orange band bordered on both sides by black bands. The end of the tail fin is almost straight. The fins have black or brown dark marks on them. The large eyes are near the top of the head of the fish. The fish's upper jaw is longer than its lower jaw.

== Distribution and habitat ==
The Roanoke logperch is known only from the upper reaches of the Roanoke, Dan and Chowan river systems in Virginia, with a small population in North Carolina. It inhabits gravel and boulder runs of slow-moving, warm, small to medium-sized rivers where it is found in riffles, runs and pools with sandy, stony or boulder-strewn bottoms.

== Behavior ==
P. rex is sexually mature by about two to three years of age. Spawning occurs from mid-April to early May in water 12–14 °C (54–57 °F). Each female may produce from 200 to 650 eggs. The eggs are adhesive to surfaces and found on the bottom of the stream or pool.

The Roanoke logperch uses its conical snout to turn over gravel and feed on exposed invertebrates. This enables it to reach prey sheltered beneath rocks that may be unavailable to other benthic fishes; however, this feeding behavior relies on the availability of loosely embedded substrate. In an ecosystem, the Roanoke logperch can be an indication that the river or lake has very low turbidity.

== Conservation status ==
The Roanoke logperch is rated by the IUCN as being "vulnerable". The threats it faces are from urbanization, the impoundment of water resulting in the silting of waterways, and industrial and agricultural pollution. Nevertheless, the population seems fairly stable and may be increasing slightly in the Pigg River.

== In popular culture ==
In 2023 the Roanoke logperch was featured on a United States Postal Service Forever stamp as part of the Endangered Species set, based on a photograph from Joel Sartore's Photo Ark. The stamp was dedicated at a ceremony at the National Grasslands Visitor Center in Wall, South Dakota.
