= Thomas Arthur (Virginia politician) =

American planter, patriot and politician

- In office October 7, 1787 – 1788 Serving with John Early

Member of the Virginia House of Delegates for Franklin County

Personal details
- Born: Thomas Arthur; July 25, 1749 Lunenburg County, Colony of Virginia
- Died: September 8, 1833 (aged 84) Knox County, Kentucky
- Spouse(s): Sarah Arthur; Sarah Dickson
- Children: at least 2 sons, 3 daughters

Military service
- Allegiance: United States
- Branch/service: Virginia Militia
- Battles/wars: American Revolutionary War

Thomas Arthur (July 25, 1749 – September 8, 1833) was an American planter, businessman, military officer and politician in Virginia and Kentucky, who helped establish Franklin County, Virginia, which he represented in the Virginia House of Delegates in 1787 and the Virginia Ratifying Convention the following year. Implicated in several scandals, Arthur moved to Kentucky by 1800, where he died three decades later, after founding a Baptist church and manumitting named slaves in his will.

== Early life and education ==
Arthur was probably born in the northwestern part of once-vast Lunenburg County that became Bedford County early in his life. His father may have been James Arthur of Lynchburg or John Arthur, whose will was probated in Bedford County in 1793. His mother, who died when Arthur was a boy, may have been Sarah Dixon, who emigrated from Ireland. He received a private education appropriate to his class in this era, which lacked public schools. Complicating matters is Revolutionary War Captain Thomas Arthur (1733–1820), who married a different wife and remained in Bedford County.

== Career ==
Arthur lived between the Staunton and Blackwater rivers in the southern part of Bedford County that became Franklin County in 1785. He had become one of Bedford county's road surveyors in the 1770s and one of its justices of the peace (who jointly governed counties in this era) in 1778.

In 1779 Arthur signed a petition to create Franklin County from portions of Bedford and Henry Counties, which although initially rejected, eventually succeeded in 1785. Arthur then became one of Franklin County's justices of the peace and one of the three surveyors of its boundary line with Henry County. The next year he protested against Hugh Innes being named colonel of the new county's militia, but Innes was named nonetheless. Arthur also sought to become the new county's sheriff (a lucrative position in that era because of commissions earned on taxes collected), but by August 1787 (two months after another man won the position), Arthur was put on trial for refusing to pay his taxes. A jury acquitted him, possibly because taxes were especially unpopular due to inflation and a shortage of hard currency. Despite (or because of the tax trial), Franklin voters elected Arthur as one of their delegates to the Virginia House of Delegates in 1787 (alongside fellow planter John Early).

In 1788, Franklin voters elected Arthur and Early as their representatives to the Virginia Ratifying Convention. Both men (perhaps following the lead of Patrick Henry) voted (unsuccessfully) against adoption of the federal Constitution. That narrow adoption vote may have led James Madison to draft the Bill of Rights pursuant to an earlier document drafted by another prominent anti-Federalist, George Mason, the Virginia Declaration of Rights.

Also in 1788, Franklin County's justices of the peace had jointly selected Arthur as colonel of the county militia (militia service being required of all white men in that era). However, in February 1791, the county lieutenant (chief executive officer and head of its militia) suspended Colonel Arthur based on four check forgery charges since 1788. One of his victims, Thomas Prunty, was a deputy sheriff who in December 1789 swore under oath that he feared for his life. Arthur was also accused of perjury as well as receiving more than he was entitled for his legislative service. In March 1792, the other justices of the peace refused to assemble if Arthur was present, and petitioned Governor Beverley Randolph to remove him from office.

By August 1791, Arthur and his family had left Franklin County. By 1799, Arthur had traveled the Wilderness Road across the Cumberland Gap to the Flat Lick area of Knox County, Kentucky, where Revolutionary War soldiers had begun settling on military bounty lands. The second Kentucky census, in 1800, included him and his son Ambrose in Knox County. Two years later his son Ambrose was a lieutenant and paymaster of the local militia. In 1803, in addition to farming, Arthur was operating a salt works (likely in that era using enslaved labor) and offered it for sale or rent in the Kentucky Gazette published in Lexington.

In 1812, Arthur helped establish the Concord Baptist Church, possibly donating the land on what was built. Although it burned in 1851, its successor (the First Baptist Church of Flat Lick) stands.

== Personal life ==
This man married Sarah Dickson on November 29, 1782, who may have been his second wife. They had a daughter Mildred who married Robert Gregory, who would be one of the executors of this man's will. His first wife (married in 1770) may also have had the same first name, but was the daughter of William Arthur and Anne Murray. This man also named a son Thomas Arthur. However, the son who lived in Knox County and continued the family's military tradition by serving as a captain in the War of 1812 was Ambrose Arthur (1776–1859), who was the other executor of this man's will. He also daughters named Mary (1776–1854) and Elizabeth (1778–1858) who married men named Clark and Leath, and were buried in the same graveyard.

== Death and legacy ==
Arthur died on September 8, 1833, in Knox County, Kentucky, and was buried in the family graveyard near Barbourville. His will gave his farm along the Cumberland River to his son Ambrose, and also emancipated slaves Mary, Lucy and Jack, each of whom was to receive the cabin and land where they already lived, as well as a cow and calf. It also gave instructions to emancipate named enslaved children when they reached age 25, and for Ambrose to emancipate a boy Harry in a few years if he behaved himself well.
