= Keeling, Virginia =

Keeling
- Unincorporated community
- Location within the state of Virginia
- Coordinates: 36°43′12″N 79°17′18″W
- Country: United States
- State: Virginia
- County: Pittsylvania County
- Elevation: 705 ft (215 m)
- Time zone: UTC−5 (Eastern (CST))
  - Summer (DST): UTC−4 (CDT)
- GNIS feature ID: 1493156

Keeling is an Unincorporated area in Pittsylvania County, Virginia, United States.

== History ==
On August 28, 2019, three people were found shot to death in a house on Keeling Drive: the suspect's mother, 62; sister, 25; and the sister's son, 1. The suspect, 18-year-old Matthew Bernard, was arrested after a chase by police, during which he was running around nude. The 25-year-old woman killed was married to longtime Tampa Bay Rays minor league pitcher Blake Bivens, who was the father of the deceased child.
