= Lucks, Virginia =

Unincorporated community in Virginia, US

Coordinates: 36°48′47″N 79°13′08″W

Lucks is an unincorporated community in Pittsylvania County, in the U.S. state of Virginia.
