= Peytonsburg, Virginia =

Unincorporated community in Virginia, US

Coordinates: 36°49′26″N 79°10′03″W

Peytonsburg is an unincorporated community in Pittsylvania County, in the U.S. state of Virginia.
