= Woods–Meade House =

Historic house in Virginia, United States

- Woods-Meade House
- U.S. National Register of Historic Places
- Virginia Landmarks Register
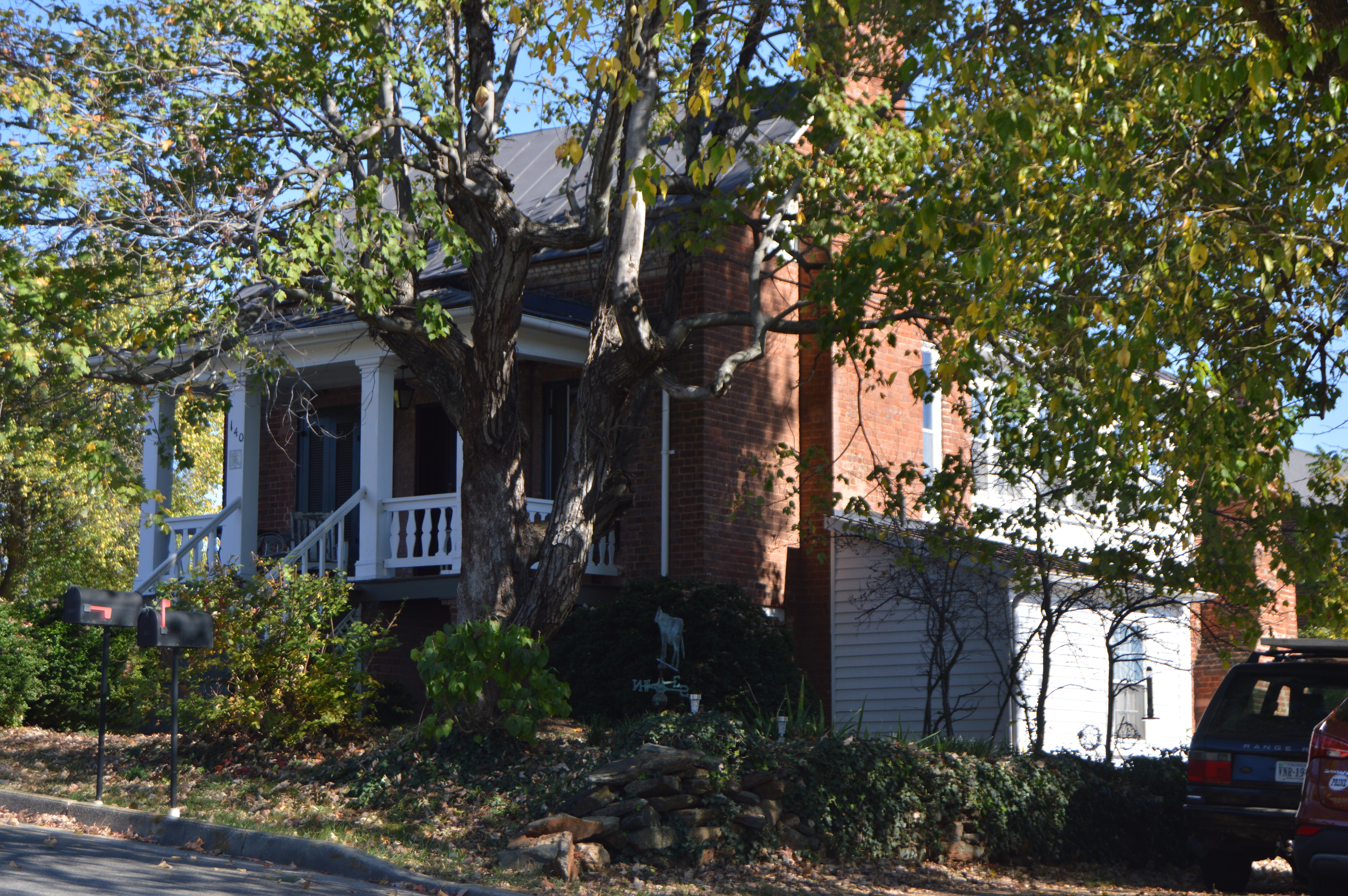
- Front of the house

- Location within Virginia Location within the United States
- Location: 118 Maple St., Rocky Mount, Virginia
- Coordinates: 36°59′48″N 79°53′16″W
- Area: 0.3 acres (0.12 ha)
- Built: c. 1830, 1834
- NRHP reference No.: 82004557
- VLR No.: 157-0003

Significant dates
- Added to NRHP: July 8, 1982
- Designated VLR: October 20, 1981

Woods–Meade House, is a historic home located at Rocky Mount, Franklin County, Virginia. The original section was built about 1830, and is the brick, one cell, front section. It features a molded brick cornice, fine jack arches, and curious half-round brick pilasters and round brick porch supports. Later additions were made to the rear of the original section, starting in 1834.

The house is named for the original owner Robert T. Woods and for Morrison Meade who acquired it in 1834 and further developed it.

It was listed on the National Register of Historic Places in 1982.
