= Henrys Mill, Virginia =

Unincorporated community in Virginia, US

Coordinates: 36°46′29″N 79°09′49″W

Henrys Mill is an unincorporated community in Pittsylvania County, in the U.S. state of Virginia.
