= Greer House =

Historic house in Virginia, United States

- U.S. National Register of Historic Places
- Virginia Landmarks Register
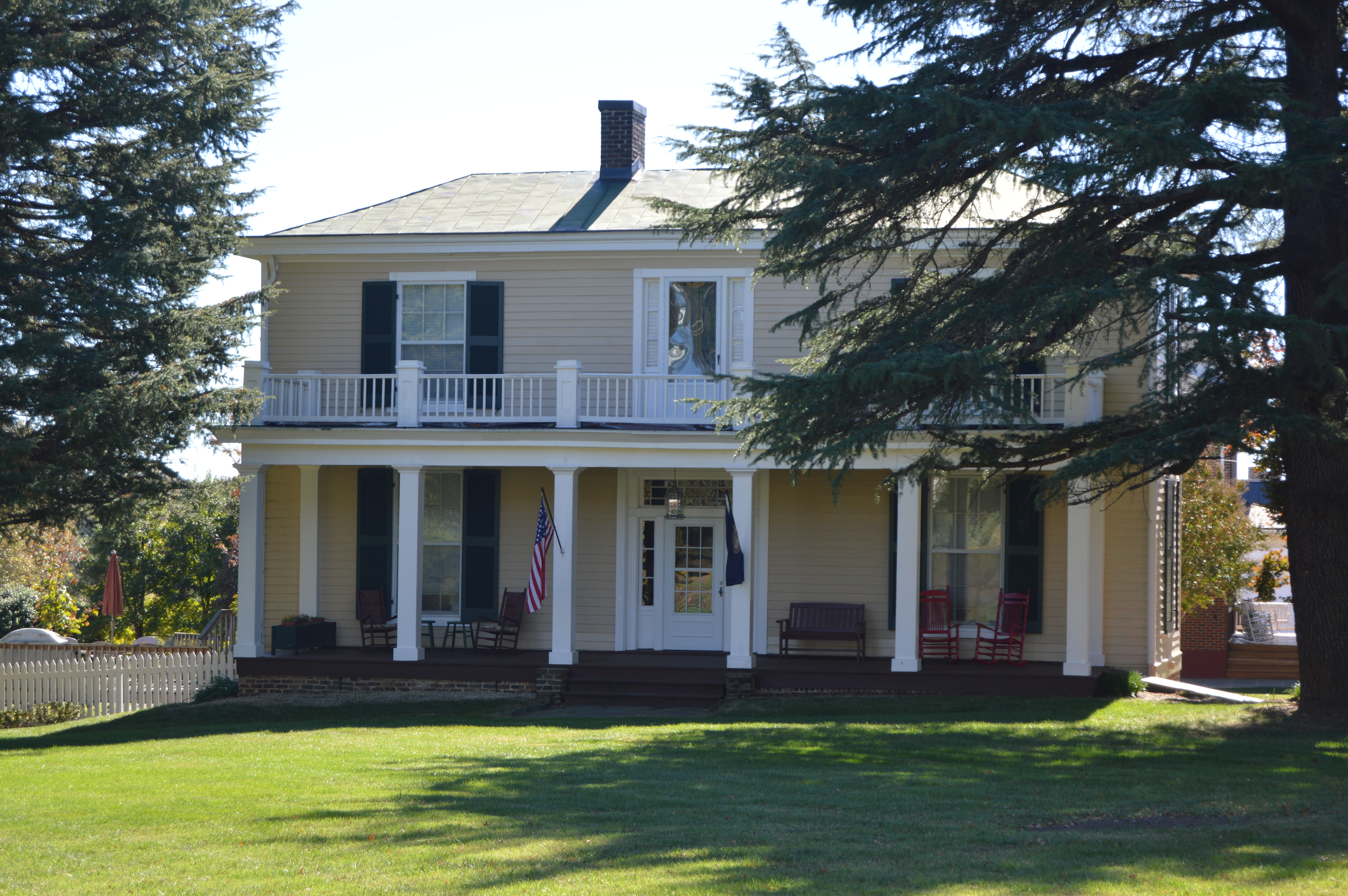
- Front of the house

- Location within Virginia Location within the United States
- Location: 206 E. Court St., Rocky Mount, Virginia
- Coordinates: 36°59′41.5″N 79°53′10″W
- Area: 0.1 acres (0.040 ha)
- Built: c. 1861
- Built by: Greer, Thomas Bailey
- Architectural style: Greek Revival
- NRHP reference No.: 90002011
- VLR No.: 157-0023

Significant dates
- Added to NRHP: December 28, 1990
- Designated VLR: February 20, 1990

Greer House is a historic home located at Rocky Mount, Franklin County, Virginia. It is a two-story, three-bay, frame dwelling in the Greek Revival style. It has a low hipped roof and is sheathed on weatherboard. The front facade features a full-width, one-story front porch topped by a balustrade. The building was started in 1861. It was originally T-shaped, until a series of three small building campaigns altered the form of the dwelling to resemble a square.

It was listed on the National Register of Historic Places in 1990.
