= James Innes (Virginia) =

American politician

2nd Attorney General of Virginia
- In office November 30, 1786 – November 13, 1796
- Preceded by: Edmund Randolph
- Succeeded by: John Marshall (acting)

Member of the Virginia House of Delegates
- In office 1786 – November 30, 1786
- Preceded by: Henry Tazewell
- Succeeded by: Samuel Griffin
- In office May 1, 1780 – April 30, 1782
- Preceded by: Nathaniel Burwell
- Succeeded by: Henry Tazewell

Personal details
- Born: 1754 Caroline County, Colony of Virginia, British America
- Died: August 2, 1798 (aged 44) Philadelphia, Pennsylvania, U.S.
- Resting place: Christ Church Burial Ground, Philadelphia, Pennsylvania
- Party: Federalist
- Relatives: Harry Innes (brother)
- Education: College of William and Mary

Military service
- Allegiance: United States
- Branch/service: Continental Army
- Rank: Lieutenant colonel
- Battles/wars: American Revolutionary War

James Innes (1754 – August 2, 1798) was an American attorney, officer in the American Revolutionary War and politician. The second Attorney General of Virginia after independence, he served a decade before resigning for health reasons. He also served in the Virginia House of Delegates and the Virginia Ratification Convention at various times representing Williamsburg or nearby James City County.

== Early life ==
Born in 1754 in Caroline County, Colony of Virginia, British America, to the former Catherine Richards and the Rev. Robert Innes. Although his mother was born in Virginia, his father had graduated from Oxford University before emigrating from Scotland to the Virginia colony, and accepted a position as rector (Anglican clergyman) in Caroline County. Innes received a private education locally, then followed in his elder brother Harry Innes's path and traveled to the colonial capital, Williamsburg to attend the College of William & Mary, where he read law with George Wythe. While at the college, he was a member of the Flat Hat Club, an early fraternity. However, tensions with Britain were mounting, and although usher of the grammar school, he rallied students in order to secure military stores which Governor Dunmore was trying to take out to a ship in the Chesapeake Bay. The faculty then remaining loyal to the Crown, he was expelled.

== Military service ==
Innes volunteered for the local militia and in February 1776 accepted a commission as captain of the Williamsburg volunteers. He marched against the British at Hampton Roads. The next November, having secured a promotion to Lieutenant Colonel of the 15th Virginia Regiment, he became an aide to General George Washington and served at the Battle of Trenton in 1776, the Battle of Princeton, Battle of Brandywine and Battle of Germantown (all in 1777) and Battle of Monmouth in June, 1778. Innes was appointed a navy commissioner in October 1778.

At General Washington's urging, Innes recruited a regiment for home defense in Williamsburg, and in 1781 commanded it at the Siege of Yorktown, which ended the British threat to the Hampton Roads area, although peace negotiations would take several additional years.

== Career ==
Innes was admitted to the Virginia bar. In 1780, voters in James City County near Williamsburg elected him as one of their two representatives in the Virginia House of Delegates, where he served alongside William Norvell. The following year, the district was split, and Innes became Williamsburg's sole representative to the House of Delegates. In 1785, the Virginia General Assembly elected Tazewell as a judge, so Innes filled the remainder of his term, then won election in his own right. In the 1786 Williamsburg City tax list, Innes owned seven adult slaves and eight slaves under 16 years of age, three horses, a cow and a 2-wheeled carriage.

Voters also elected James Innes to the Virginia Ratification Convention of 1788, at which he supported the new federal Constitution, though his brother was a supporter of Patrick Henry (one of the leaders of the anti-ratification faction).

Fellow legislators elected Innes to succeed Edmund Randolph as Virginia's Attorney General, and he served a decade before resigning for health reasons. Nonetheless, Innes accepted a federal appointment which President Washington offered as one of the commissioners under Jay's treaty.

== Death and legacy ==
Innes died in Philadelphia on August 2, 1798, and was buried at the Christ Church burial ground.

Legal offices
Preceded by Edmund Randolph	Attorney General of Virginia; 1786 – 1796	Succeeded by John Marshall (acting)
