= Rocky Mount, Virginia =

- Town
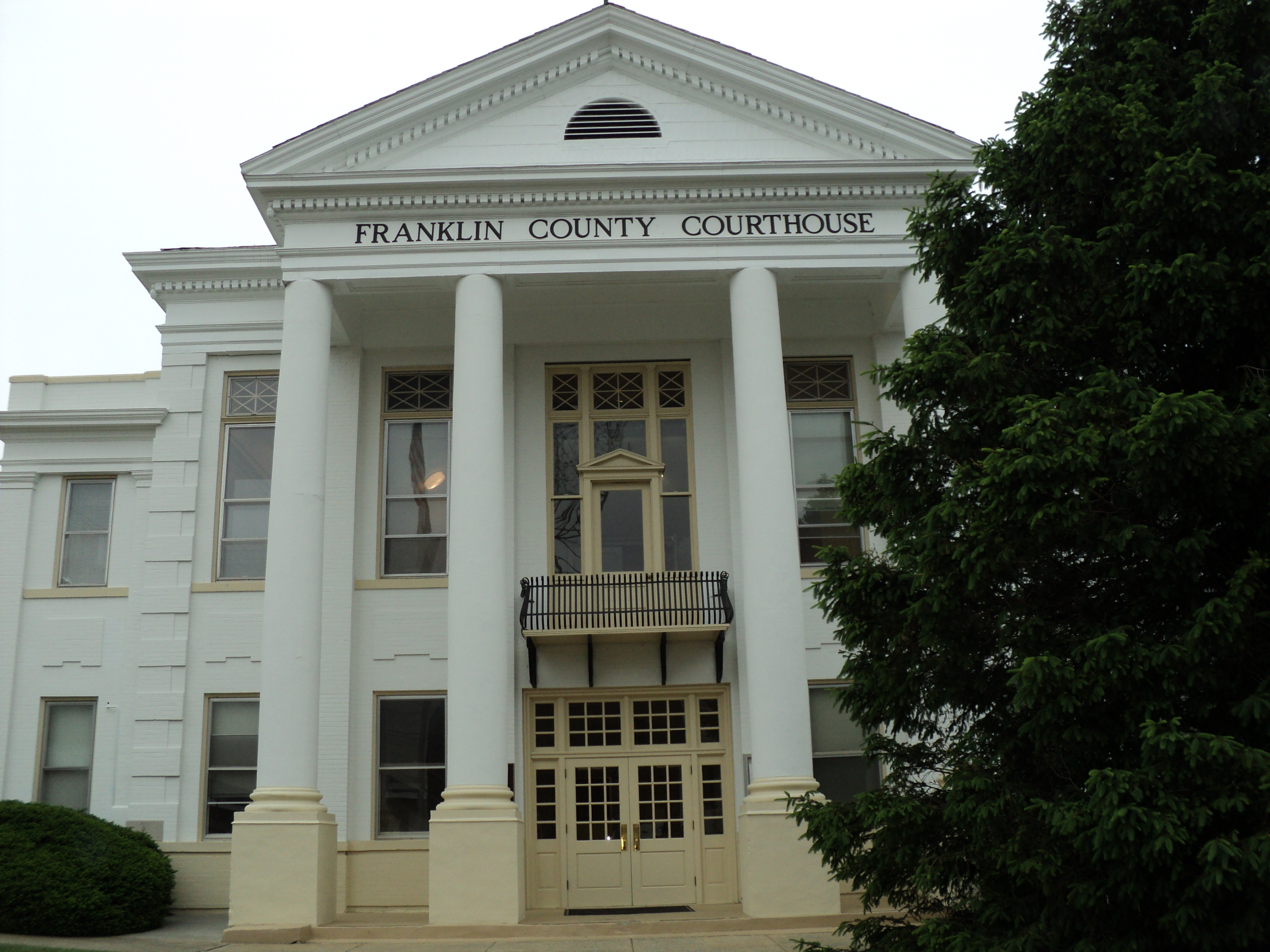
- Franklin County courthouse, built 1909

- Seal
- Motto: Crescit eundo It grows as it goes
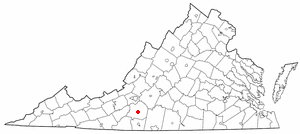
- Location of Rocky Mount in Franklin County
- Coordinates: 36°59′44″N 79°53′20″W
- Country: United States
- State: Virginia
- County: Franklin
- Founded: 1786

Government
  - Mayor: C. Holland Perdue III

Area
  - Total: 6.85 sq mi (17.74 km^{2})
  - Land: 6.81 sq mi (17.65 km^{2})
  - Water: 0.035 sq mi (0.09 km^{2})
- Elevation: 1,200 ft (370 m)

Population (2020)
  - Total: 4,903
  - Density: 693.0/sq mi (267.58/km^{2})
- Time zone: UTC−5 (Eastern (EST))
  - Summer (DST): UTC−4 (EDT)
- ZIP code: 24151
- FIPS code: 51-68496
- GNIS feature ID: 1499983
- Website: www.rockymountva.org

Rocky Mount is a town in and the county seat of Franklin County, Virginia, United States. The town is part of the Roanoke metropolitan area, and had a population of 4,903 as of the 2020 census. It is located in the Roanoke Region of Virginia.

== History ==
Robert Hill built a block house (fortified residence and trading post) in the 1740s, for trading with Native Americans. English settlers did not arrive until 1760. They named Rocky Mount for a steep cliff near the town. The area originally consisted of two adjacent villages, Rocky Mount and Mount Pleasant.

Washington Iron Furnace was built by James Callaway and Jeremiah Early; its site was on what is now Main Street. It was operated by Callaway's heirs and Peter Saunders until 1850, when it was damaged by a flood. Repairs and rebuilding were stopped by the breakout of Civil War.

The first court session was held at Rocky Mount in 1786 following the Revolutionary War. It was held in Callaway's home until he deeded land to the town on which to build the courthouse. The first was made of logs. Rocky Mount was assigned a post office in 1795.

The town was divided into lots in 1804. Jeremiah's son John Early represented the county (part-time) in the Virginia House of Delegates and served as sheriff. He operated a plantation nearby. The courthouse was replaced in 1831.

By 1836 the iron furnace employed 100 people. The town had about 275 residents; it had 30 houses and several businesses, including three grocery stores and a newspaper/printing office. The oldest dwelling is "Mount Pleasant", built overlooking the courthouse in 1829 for Caleb Tate (the court clerk for nearly 40 years, from 1797-1835). Its detached brick kitchen, built circa 1820, is the oldest building in town. The Rocky Mount Turnpike Company incorporated in 1846 and a bank was founded shortly afterward, but neither prospered.

During the Civil War, numerous planter families from the Tidewater region sought refuge in Rocky Mount. Many brought numerous black American slaves with them, in part trying to ensure they did not escape to Union forces. Among these were the immediate past governor, Henry A. Wise, who settled his family here from his plantation on the Elizabeth River before he started serving as a Confederate general. Jubal Anderson Early, who became a Confederate general during the war, was born on a plantation nearby. Before the war, he served one term representing Franklin County in the Virginia House of Delegates and more than a decade as Commonwealth's attorney (prosecutor). After the war, he resumed his legal practice here and in Lynchburg, Virginia. His office building in Rocky Mount was demolished in 1937.

One of the oldest buildings constructed in that era that still survives was built for Dr. Thomas Greer in 1861. Despite this, there are two older buildings constructed between 1850-1854, which are both still used as law offices to this day.

The town's clerk, Robert A. Scott, issued scrip to assist families of Confederate soldiers during the Civil War. The Confederate government requisitioned slaves from various planters in the county to work on Richmond's defenses. Rocky Mount had no battles, although Union Gen. George Stoneman and troops passed through the county in the war's final days.

In 1867, the Freedmen's Bureau under William F. DeKnight opened a Sunday school in Rocky Mount; about a third of the residents were black American freedmen. No day school was established for freedmen's children until much later. Booker Taliaferro Washington was born enslaved in Franklin County. After the war, his mother moved with him to the free state of West Virginia for his education. He later studied at the Hampton Institute, established in eastern Virginia for the education of blacks.

The area's major cash crop both before and after the Civil War was tobacco. In 1873, Rocky Mount incorporated as a town and absorbed the smaller village of Mount Pleasant, establishing its present boundaries. Former court clerk Robert Scott was elected as the first mayor.

Rocky Mount's population was about 400 people in 1870, 600 in 1897, and about 1100 in 1920. In 1880, the Franklin and Pittsylvania Railroad connected Rocky Mount to Danville and Lynchburg via Pittsylvania County, Virginia. Most of the buildings in town burned in a destructive fire in 1889.

Another railroad was constructed through town about 1892, and stimulated industrial and commercial development. The railroad (known as the Norfolk and Western Railway) was nicknamed the "Pumpkin Vine" because of its route between Roanoke, Virginia and Winston-Salem, North Carolina. Canadawas y Mills (a gristmill and box factory) was built in 1898.

Nathanial V. Angle, a former schoolteacher who became an entrepreneur, built the Bald Knob furniture factory in 1903. (It became the Lane Furniture Company in 1957 and is known as the MW Manufacturing Company in the 21st century). By World War I, N.V. Angle owned a furniture and grocery stores, a lumberyard, tobacco house, agricultural implement store, and the area's first Ford automobile dealership.

Much of the town's historic architecture, both residential and commercial, dates from the first decades of the 20th century. Only the Lodge Rooms (Colored), built in 1900, remains of the former thriving black American community on West Court Street. The furniture and textile workers needed housing, and contractors also built more elaborate (including Victorian-style) dwellings for managers and professionals. Rocky Mount is roughly halfway between Roanoke and Martinsville, Virginia, which likewise developed furniture manufacturing and textile industries early in the 20th century.

The present Franklin County courthouse was constructed in 1909 (two years after the Norfolk and Western freight and passenger station). It was modeled on the Roanoke County courthouse in Salem, Virginia.

The town's growth was reflected in construction of new churches. Trinity Episcopal Church and its Rectory were both built in 1874 and survived the 1889 fire. The church was moved back from Main Street in 1906. The African Methodist Episcopal Church, built before the fire, no longer exists. The Presbyterian Church (built by 1880) reopened shortly after the fire. The Methodists rebuilt their church of brick; they replace Scott Memorial Church again in 1925. The Baptist Church (colored) built in 1907 was later deconsecrated and became a business. The Bethel AME church, built before World War I, continues to be in active use.

A Coca-Cola bottling plant opened in town circa 1920. The area's oldest car dealership (Chevrolet) dates from 1926 (although housed in a building from 1916). Ryland Goode also established a car dealership for Dodges and Hudsons that year. The building for the International Harvester dealership dates from 1946; the John Deere dealership (built 1940) has been adapted for use as the county's Developmental Center. New industries continued to be established before World War II. Around 1940 Sealtest established a dairy bottling plant and Exchange Milling opened an animal feed processing plant.

The Art Deco-style People's National Bank was built in 1928.

Public schools were segregated, and those for black students were underfunded. In 1915, Rocky Mount appropriated $2,200 to build an eight-room brick school for white students, complete with central heating and indoor plumbing. The same year black residents built Rocky Mount Colored School and dormitory, at their own expense, on Bald Knob outside the town limits. The town became a school district and in 1924 built a high school for white students. By 1940 the town's white students had 16 teachers.

Only seven black American teachers "struggled with the problems of their race in their own schools." Around that time, a foundation was established to mark Booker T. Washington's birthplace. In 1952 it donated 6 acres of land on which to build a modern, four-room school for black students. That opened shortly before the start of Massive Resistance to school desegregation in Virginia. It was operated until 1966, when the U.S. Supreme Court found subsidies for segregated schools (much used by the county's white schoolchildren) to be unconstitutional. This structure has been adapted for use as an administrative building of the National Park Service.

Rocky Mount's brick Municipal Building was built in 1929. The Works Progress Administration of the President Franklin D. Roosevelt administration built the United States Post Office in 1936, during the Great Depression. The county jail was built in the Art Moderne style in 1938, also a depression project.

Investment in infrastructure was increased by the federal government. The town applied for funds to upgrade its sewer system. The New Deal project with most effects may have been work on U.S. Route 220 and state route 40 near the town. The WPA and prominent local businessman N. V. Angle drained a swamp and developed the land for Mary Elizabeth Park, named for Angle's wife. It is now maintained by the local Presbyterian church (although Angle was a Methodist).

Before World War II, Rocky Mount's industries included a silk mill and a door and sash window factory, in addition to Angle's furniture company.

The library, constructed in 1940, was one of ten funded by an anonymous donor in rural Virginia counties in that era. It now serves as an administration building. The county's administration building, built in 1967, is along the same street and is named for Virgil Goode Sr., former Virginia House delegate and Commonwealth's attorney. In 1990, local residents saved the former Norfolk and Western station. It has been redeveloped as a tourist information center.

The Booker T. Washington National Monument, Evergreen-Callaway-Deyerle House, The Farm, Greer House, Rocky Mount Historic District, Washington Iron Furnace, and Woods-Meade House are listed on the National Register of Historic Places.

== Geography ==
Rocky Mount is located at the center of Franklin County at 36°59′59″N 79°53′23″W (36.999855, −79.889673). U.S. Route 220 passes through the east side of town as a limited-access bypass, leading north 23 miles (37 km) to Roanoke and south 26 miles (42 km) to Martinsville. Virginia State Route 40 passes through the center of Rocky Mount as Pell Avenue and Franklin Street, leading east 32 miles (51 km) to Gretna and southwest 10 miles (16 km) to Ferrum.

According to the United States Census Bureau, the town has a total area of 6.9 square miles (17.8 km^{2}), of which 0.03 square miles (0.07 km^{2}), or 0.39%, is water. The Pigg River, an east-flowing tributary of the Roanoke River, forms the southern border of the town. The 1,934-foot (589 m) summit of Grassy Hill is in the northern part of town.

== Climate ==
The climate in this area is characterized by hot, humid summers and generally mild to cool winters. According to the Köppen Climate Classification system, Rocky Mount has a humid subtropical climate, abbreviated "Cfa" on climate maps.

Climate data for Rocky Mount, Virginia (1991–2020 normals, extremes 1894–present)
| Month | Jan | Feb | Mar | Apr | May | Jun | Jul | Aug | Sep | Oct | Nov | Dec | Year |
|---|---|---|---|---|---|---|---|---|---|---|---|---|---|
| Record high °F (°C) | 80 (27) | 81 (27) | 92 (33) | 96 (36) | 101 (38) | 103 (39) | 103 (39) | 101 (38) | 100 (38) | 98 (37) | 95 (35) | 82 (28) | 103 (39) |
| Mean daily maximum °F (°C) | 47.0 (8.3) | 50.8 (10.4) | 58.8 (14.9) | 69.6 (20.9) | 76.2 (24.6) | 83.2 (28.4) | 86.6 (30.3) | 85.2 (29.6) | 78.6 (25.9) | 69.7 (20.9) | 59.1 (15.1) | 50.0 (10.0) | 67.9 (19.9) |
| Daily mean °F (°C) | 36.7 (2.6) | 39.0 (3.9) | 46.2 (7.9) | 55.6 (13.1) | 63.9 (17.7) | 71.8 (22.1) | 75.7 (24.3) | 74.1 (23.4) | 67.3 (19.6) | 56.7 (13.7) | 46.3 (7.9) | 39.5 (4.2) | 56.1 (13.4) |
| Mean daily minimum °F (°C) | 26.4 (−3.1) | 27.2 (−2.7) | 33.6 (0.9) | 41.7 (5.4) | 51.6 (10.9) | 60.3 (15.7) | 64.8 (18.2) | 63.0 (17.2) | 56.0 (13.3) | 43.8 (6.6) | 33.5 (0.8) | 29.0 (−1.7) | 44.2 (6.8) |
| Record low °F (°C) | −11 (−24) | −5 (−21) | 0 (−18) | 12 (−11) | 18 (−8) | 27 (−3) | 44 (7) | 36 (2) | 30 (−1) | 15 (−9) | 7 (−14) | −4 (−20) | −11 (−24) |
| Average precipitation inches (mm) | 3.88 (99) | 3.11 (79) | 3.99 (101) | 4.07 (103) | 4.49 (114) | 4.86 (123) | 4.49 (114) | 4.10 (104) | 5.00 (127) | 3.40 (86) | 3.66 (93) | 4.13 (105) | 49.18 (1,249) |
| Average snowfall inches (cm) | 3.6 (9.1) | 4.9 (12) | 2.5 (6.4) | 0.2 (0.51) | 0.0 (0.0) | 0.0 (0.0) | 0.0 (0.0) | 0.0 (0.0) | 0.0 (0.0) | 0.0 (0.0) | 0.0 (0.0) | 1.4 (3.6) | 12.6 (32) |
| Average precipitation days (≥ 0.01 in) | 9.9 | 8.9 | 10.3 | 11.0 | 12.3 | 11.0 | 13.1 | 11.6 | 10.3 | 8.7 | 8.8 | 9.9 | 125.8 |
| Average snowy days (≥ 0.1 in) | 2.0 | 1.4 | 0.9 | 0.1 | 0.0 | 0.0 | 0.0 | 0.0 | 0.0 | 0.0 | 0.0 | 1.1 | 5.5 |
Source: NOAA

== Demographics ==
Historical population
| Census | Pop. | Note | %± |
|---|---|---|---|
| 1880 | 315 | | — |
| 1890 | 628 | | 99.4% |
| 1900 | 612 | | −2.5% |
| 1910 | 967 | | 58.0% |
| 1920 | 1,076 | | 11.3% |
| 1930 | 1,339 | | 24.4% |
| 1940 | 1,366 | | 2.0% |
| 1950 | 1,432 | | 4.8% |
| 1960 | 1,412 | | −1.4% |
| 1970 | 4,002 | | 183.4% |
| 1980 | 4,198 | | 4.9% |
| 1990 | 4,098 | | −2.4% |
| 2000 | 4,066 | | −0.8% |
| 2010 | 4,799 | | 18.0% |
| 2020 | 4,903 | | 2.2% |
U.S. Decennial Census

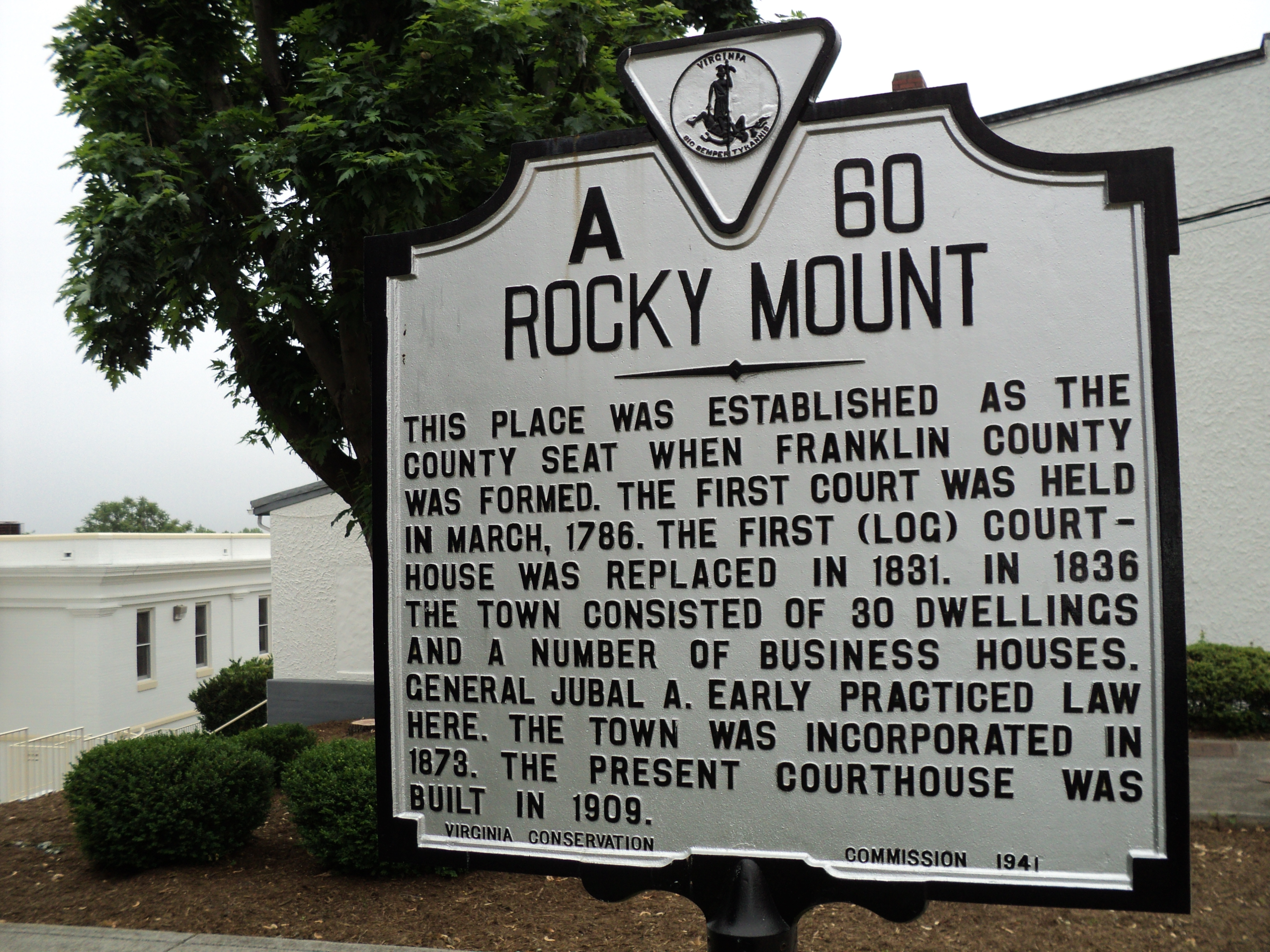
State historical marker for Rocky Mount

=== 2020 census ===
As of the 2020 census, Rocky Mount had a population of 4,903. The median age was 43.9 years. 20.6% of residents were under the age of 18 and 23.7% of residents were 65 years of age or older. For every 100 females there were 82.1 males, and for every 100 females age 18 and over there were 77.2 males age 18 and over.

98.1% of residents lived in urban areas, while 1.9% lived in rural areas.

There were 2,130 households in Rocky Mount, of which 27.2% had children under the age of 18 living in them. Of all households, 33.7% were married-couple households, 17.7% were households with a male householder and no spouse or partner present, and 41.2% were households with a female householder and no spouse or partner present. About 37.4% of all households were made up of individuals and 17.9% had someone living alone who was 65 years of age or older.

There were 2,307 housing units, of which 7.7% were vacant. The homeowner vacancy rate was 2.0% and the rental vacancy rate was 5.1%.

Racial composition as of the 2020 census
| Race | Number | Percent |
|---|---|---|
| White | 3,391 | 69.2% |
| Black or African American | 1,023 | 20.9% |
| American Indian and Alaska Native | 10 | 0.2% |
| Asian | 70 | 1.4% |
| Native Hawaiian and Other Pacific Islander | 2 | 0.0% |
| Some other race | 112 | 2.3% |
| Two or more races | 295 | 6.0% |
| Hispanic or Latino (of any race) | 223 | 4.5% |

=== Income and poverty ===
The median income for a household in the town was $46,021 and the median income for a family was $56,250.

=== 2000 census ===
As of the census of 2000, there were 4,066 people, 1,698 households, and 1,018 families residing in the town. The population density was 886.5 people per square mile (342.0/km^{2}). There were 1,796 housing units at an average density of 391.6 per square mile (151.1/km^{2}). The racial makeup of the town was 74.50% White, 22.26% African American, 0.27% Native American, 1.11% Asian, 0.10% Pacific Islander, 0.49% from other races, and 1.28% from two or more races. Hispanic or Latino of any race were 1.67% of the population.

There were 1,698 households, out of which 26.4% had children under the age of 18 living with them, 40.2% were married couples living together, 15.8% had a female householder with no husband present, and 40.0% were non-families. 36.5% of all households were made up of individuals, and 18.7% had someone living alone who was 65 years of age or older. The average household size was 2.21 and the average family size was 2.87.

In the town, the population was spread out, with 21.4% under the age of 18, 7.7% from 18 to 24, 25.2% from 25 to 44, 22.1% from 45 to 64, and 23.6% who were 65 years of age or older. The median age was 42 years. For every 100 females, there were 85.0 males. For every 100 females age 18 and over, there were 81.1 males.

The median income for a household in the town was $26,927, and the median income for a family was $38,688. Males had a median income of $30,947 versus $22,472 for females. The per capita income for the town was $16,207. About 16.6% of families and 14.1% of the population were below the poverty line, including 17.6% of those under age 18 and 14.0% of those age 65 or over.

== Notable people ==
- Joey Arrington, racing driver
- Jane Derby, fashion designer, was born here
- Jubal A. Early, Confederate general, had his law office here for several years and lived here
- Ron Hodges, former New York Mets catcher, was born and grew up in Rocky Mount
- Jesse L. Martin, actor, was born and grew up here
- Virgil Goode, politician, grew up here
- Satch Worley, racing driver
