= Sandy Creek (Banister River tributary) =

Stream in Virginia, USA

Sandy Creek Tributary to Banister River
- Location of Sandy Creek mouth Sandy Creek (Banister River tributary) (the United States)

Location
- Country: United States
- State: Virginia
- County: Halifax; Pittsylvania

Physical characteristics
- Source: unnamed tributary to Banister River divide
  - location: about 1 mile northwest of Chestnut Level, Virginia
  - coordinates: 36°44′39″N 079°22′34″W
  - elevation: 790 ft (240 m)
- Mouth
  - location: about 1.5 miles south-southeast of Meadville, Virginia
  - coordinates: 36°49′36″N 079°01′24″W
  - elevation: 358 ft (109 m)
- Length: 29.37 mi (47.27 km)
- Basin size: 99.22 square miles (257.0 km^{2})
- Discharge
  - location: Banister River
  - average: 114.70 cu ft/s (3.248 m^{3}/s) at mouth with Banister River

Basin features
- Progression: Banister River → Dan River → Roanoke River → Albemarle Sound → Pamlico Sound → Atlantic Ocean
- River system: Roanoke River
- Tributaries
  - left: Sweden Fork; Johns Run
  - right: Pine Creek; Bar Branch; Lick Branch
- Bridges: Chestnut Level Road, Dodson Road, Lester Road, Slatesville Road, Mt Tabor Road, Henrys Mill Road, Nunnleys Bridge Road, Johnson Mill Road, Chatham Road

Sandy Creek is a river in the United States state of Virginia. It is a tributary of the Banister River.

== See also ==
- List of rivers of Virginia
