= Pickaway, Virginia =

Unincorporated community in Virginia, US

Coordinates: 36°46′42″N 79°11′07″W

Pickaway is an unincorporated community in Pittsylvania County, in the U.S. state of Virginia.
