= Harry Innes =

American judge

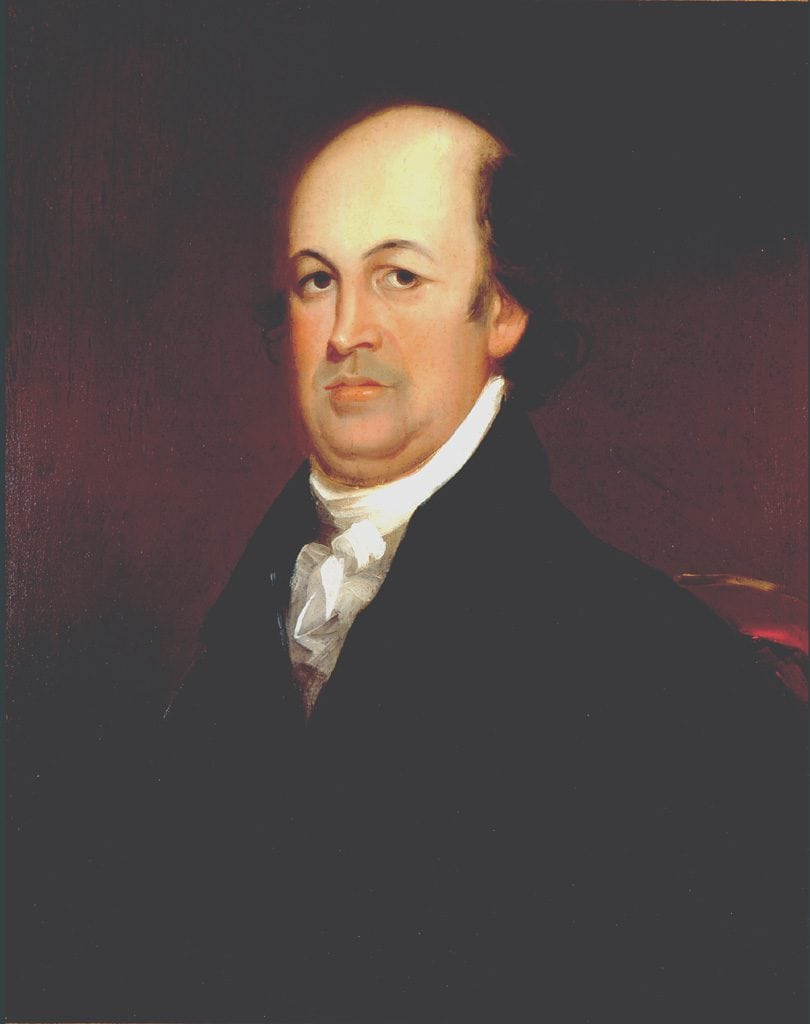
- Portrait by Matthew Harris Jouett

Judge of the United States District Court for the District of Kentucky
- In office September 26, 1789 – September 20, 1816
- Appointed by: George Washington
- Preceded by: Seat established by 1 Stat. 73
- Succeeded by: Robert Trimble

Personal details
- Born: Harry Innes; January 4, 1752 Caroline County, Colony of Virginia, British America
- Died: September 20, 1816 (aged 64) Frankfort, Kentucky
- Relations: James Innes Thornton (grandson); James Innes (brother); John Todd (son-in-law); John J. Crittenden (son-in-law)
- Children: 2
- Education: College of William & Mary read law

Harry Innes (January 4, 1752 – September 20, 1816) was a Virginia lawyer and patriot during the American Revolutionary War who became a local judge and prosecutor as well as helped establish the state of Kentucky, before he accepted appointment as United States district judge of the United States District Court for the District of Kentucky and served until his death.

== Early and family life ==
Born on January 4, 1752, in Caroline County, Colony of Virginia, British America, to the former Catherine Richards and the Rev. Robert Innes. His father had graduated from Oxford University before emigrating from Scotland to the Virginia colony, and accepted a position as rector (Anglican clergyman) in Caroline County. Innes received a private education locally at Donald Robertson's school, then traveled to the colonial capital, Williamsburg to attend the College of William & Mary, where he read law beginning in 1772 with George Wythe. His younger brother James Innes (1754–1798) would follow him at William and Mary, but would be dismissed from the college in 1775 for leading a band of students who blocked Governor Dunmore's agents from removing military stores to ships offshore.

== Career ==
Admitted to the Virginia bar when he reached legal age in 1773, Innes moved westward to Bedford County and began a private legal practice on what was then the frontier, as well as farmed and speculated in land. Like his younger brother James Innes, Harry Innes supported independence of the United States and Virginia as tensions mounted between the Virginia General Assembly and successive royal governors, especially after Lord Dunmore's War, which led Governor Dunmore to dismiss the House of Burgesses in 1775. From 1776 to 1777, the local Virginia Committee of Safety employed Innes to manage the militarily crucial Chiswell lead mines on the New River, in what was then Fincastle (now Wythe) County, as well as to procure other necessary supplies for the Continental Army. Meanwhile, his brother James took up arms, received a commission as lieutenant colonel and became an aide to General George Washington, fighting at the battles of Trenton, Princeton, Brandywine, Germantown and Monmouth.

In 1778, when James Innes became a navy commissioner, Virginia Governor Patrick Henry appointed Harry Innes deputy attorney for Bedford County. In 1779, the Virginia legislature appointed Harry Innes as commissioner to settle claims to unpatented lands around Abingdon. In that same year, Governor Thomas Jefferson appointed Harry Innes escheator for Bedford County, and he began liquidating properties of Loyalists who had left the colony. His success in those endeavors (and perhaps James Innes' election to the Virginia House of Delegates representing James City County) led on March 27, 1782, to Harry Innes' being appointed as superintendent over the commissioners of six southwestern Virginia counties: Bedford, Campbell, Charlotte, Halifax, Henry and Pittsylvania.

Harry Innes would soon travel the Wilderness Road over the Cumberland Gap and seek his fortune in what had been called Kentucky County until being split into three sparsely settled counties in 1780. In the fall of 1782, Virginia's legislature elected Innes as an Assistant Judge of the Supreme Court of Judicature for the District of Kentucky. On November 3, 1782, Innes was sworn in at Crow's Station (in Pittsylvania County near present-day Danville), as were Judges Caleb Wallace and Samuel McDowell, but he did not move to the District of Kentucky until 1783. Meanwhile, residents of what was then Fayette County, Jefferson County and Lincoln County repeatedly petitioned Virginia's legislature as well as the Continental Congress to create a new state of Kentucky, and held several conventions at Danville as discussed below. Innes served as Attorney General for the District of Kentucky from 1784 to 1789, the year of his accepting the federal judicial posts and months before Virginia's legislature formally consented to creation of the new state.

=== Agitation for independence of Kentucky from Virginia and anti-federalism ===
Innes was convinced that Kentucky's destiny lay in separation from Virginia. Decisions of the Kentucky courts were not final, and appeals had to be carried over the mountains to Richmond. There was no executive authority in Kentucky nor any authority to call out the militia to protect the citizens from Indian attacks. Innes joined the movement for immediate and unconditional separation from Virginia. It took eight years and ten conventions before the parties (United States, Virginia, and Kentucky) could agree upon terms of separation. A constitution was finally written and approved before Kentucky attained statehood. Innes was a member of eight of these conventions and president of the first electoral college for the choice of governor and lieutenant governor under the first state constitution.

Even though Innes and Patrick Henry disagreed over Kentucky independence, both opposed the ratification of the Constitution. Considered Anti-federalists and later Democratic-Republicans, Innes, and fellow Kentuckians: John Brown, Thomas Todd, George Nicholas, John Breckinridge and Henry Clay looked to Thomas Jefferson for leadership in the emerging national party structure. Opposed to their politics was the Marshall family, headed by Colonel Thomas Marshall and included the future chief justice, John Marshall. The Marshall family became the nucleus of the Federalist Party in Kentucky and provided the core for other groups who opposed Jeffersonian politics.

=== Other activities ===
Concurrent with his service as a Judge and later as Attorney General, Innes practiced law, farmed, speculated in land and raised a family. He became a trustee of Transylvania University and an honored charter member of the Danville Political Club. A scholar and lover of books, he built a distinguished library.

== Federal judicial service ==
President George Washington on September 24, 1789, nominated Harry Innes to the United States District Court for the District of Kentucky, to a new seat authorized by 1 Stat. 73. He was confirmed by the United States Senate on September 26, 1789, and received his commission the same day.

The Judiciary Act of 1801 (2 Stat. 89) abolished the United States District Court for the District of Kentucky on February 13, 1801, and assigned Innes to serve as a United States District Judge of the United States Circuit Court for the Sixth Circuit. The Act was repealed on March 8, 1802, reestablishing the United States District Court for the District of Kentucky as of July 1, 1802.

As a federal judge, Innes presided over the first treason trial of Aaron Burr, after federal attorney Joseph Hamilton Daveiss accused Burr of preparing to invade Mexico as part of the Burr conspiracy.

=== Conflict with Humphrey Marshall ===
Former U.S. senator Humphrey Marshall was a long-time detractor of Innes. Marshall claimed that Innes was involved in James Wilkinson's "Spanish Conspiracy", in which Wilkinson was alleged (and later proven) to have served as a spy for the Spanish government and attempted to annex Kentucky to Spain; Innes had served as a witness in the impeachment trial of state appellate judge Benjamin Sebastian, who was receiving a pension from King Charles IV of Spain, and Marshall viewed Innes as being incriminated in this case.

In response to Marshall's attacks on Innes in the Franklin Western World newspaper, Innes sued Marshall (in the Mercer Circuit Court) and World cofounder Joseph M. Street (in the Jessamine Circuit Court) for libel, with Henry Clay serving as Innes' counsel. In 1808, congressman John Rowan, on behalf of Marshall (then a state representative), filed an impeachment resolution against Innes, which went nowhere; Innes' son-in-law, state representative Thomas Bodley, retaliated by seeking a censure of Marshall, which was successful and resulted in Marshall being expelled from the state house, although he was reelected once more in 1809. Innes and his allies contributed to a book by William Litrell on the Spanish conspiracy, and Humphrey subsequently issued History of Kentucky in 1812, which included attacks on Innes.

A verdict was reached in the case against Street in 1811, with Innes being awarded $750 in damages which he refused to collect as he did not want his case to appear financially motivated; Street subsequently shuttered the World and moved to Illinois. Street returned in 1814 to testify in the case against Marshall, resulting in Innes issuing a writ for Street to pay the $750 in his earlier libel case; Street was unable to and was imprisoned. The case against Marshall ended in a hung jury in 1814, and the following year, Innes and Marshall settled the case on the condition that neither would slander the other.

== Personal life ==
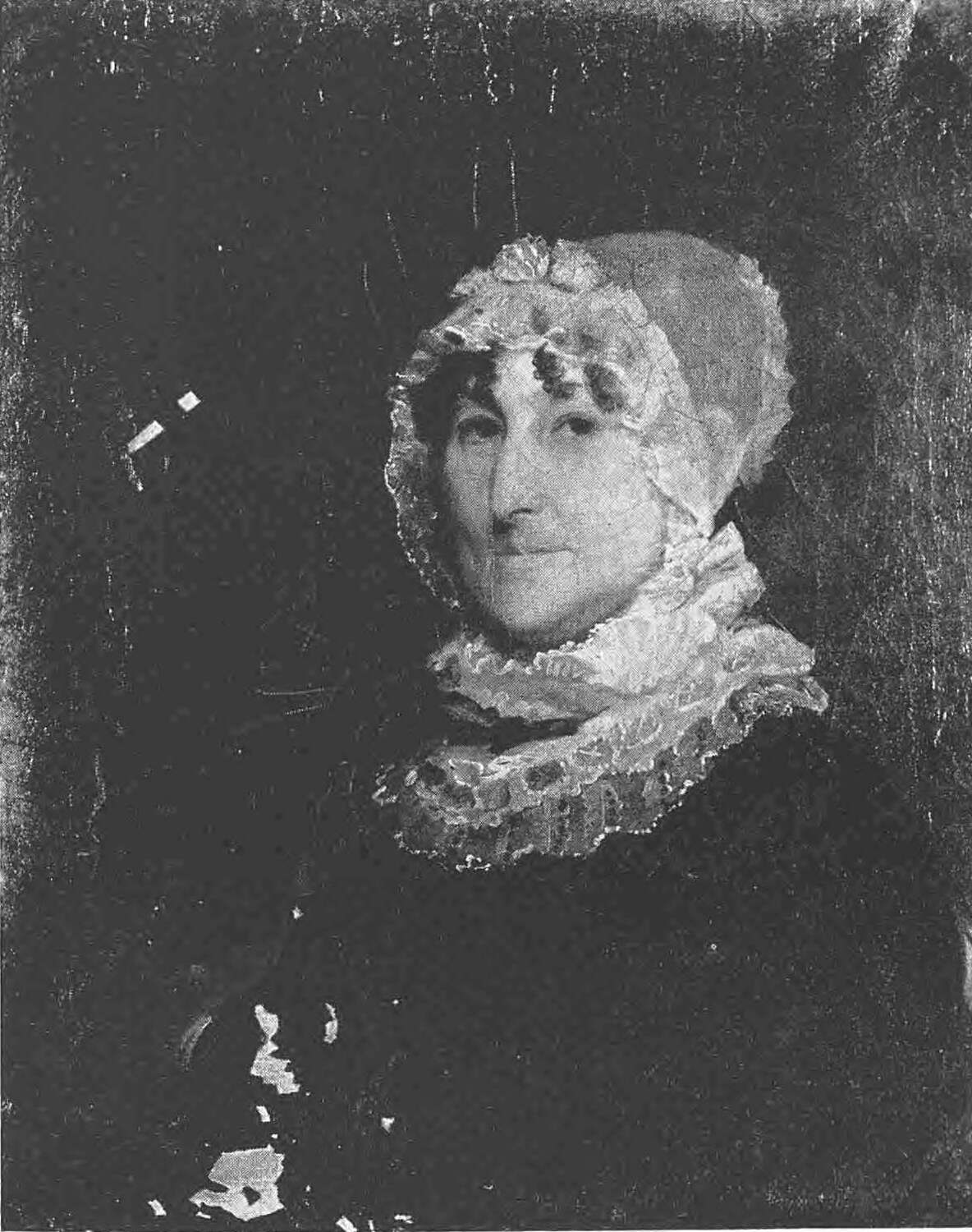
Ann Harris Shiell, portrait by Matthew Harris Jouett

Innes married twice. His first wife was Elizabeth Calloway, daughter of Colonel James Callaway, of Bedford County, Virginia. She died in 1791, after giving birth to four daughters. He later married Mrs. Ann Harris Shiell, widow of Dr. Hugh Shiell. They had one child, Maria, who married John Harris Todd, and after his death, John J. Crittenden. They also raised a daughter from Ann's first marriage.

== Death and legacy ==
On September 20, 1816, Judge Innes died in Frankfort, Kentucky, survived by his widow and several children and a stepdaughter.

Legal offices
Preceded by Seat established by 1 Stat. 73	Judge of the United States District Court for the District of Kentucky; 1789–1816	Succeeded by Robert Trimble
