= Dan's Hill =

Historic house in Virginia, United States

- U.S. National Register of Historic Places
- Virginia Landmarks Register
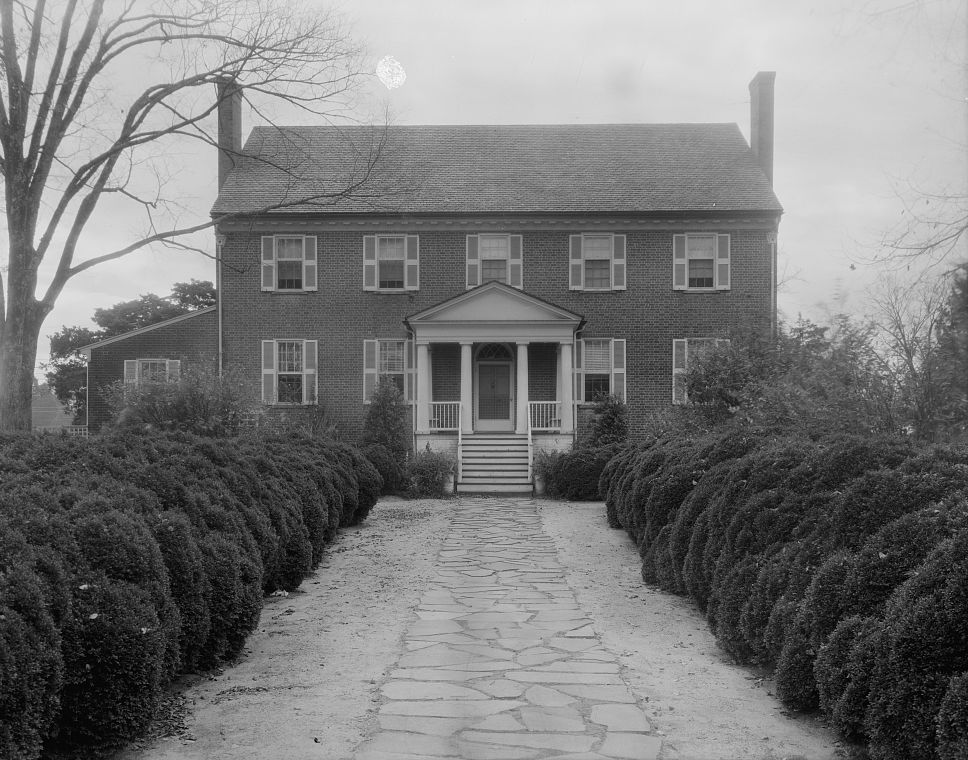
- Dan's Hill, Carnegie Survey of the South, 1930s

- Location within Virginia Location within the United States
- Location: 4 mi. (6.4 km) W of Danville, near Danville, Virginia
- Coordinates: 36°35′17″N 79°28′48″W
- Area: 93 acres (38 ha)
- Built: 1833
- Built by: Dejarnett, James
- Architectural style: Federal
- NRHP reference No.: 79003067
- VLR No.: 108-5066

Significant dates
- Added to NRHP: May 30, 1979
- Designated VLR: October 17, 1978

Dan's Hill is a historic home located near Danville in Pittsylvania County, Virginia. It was built in 1833, and is a 2 1/2-story, five bay Federal style brick dwelling. It has a double pile, central-hall plan and a gable roof. Also on the property are the contributing kitchen building, a dairy, a gazebo, an orangery, a privy, smokehouses, and a spinning house.

It was listed on the National Register of Historic Places in 1979.
