= Pigg River =

Coordinates: 36.971469°N 79.791253°W

The Pigg River is a river in south-west Virginia in the United States. It is a tributary of the Roanoke River, which flows to the Atlantic Ocean via Albemarle Sound.

The Pigg River rises on Fivemile Mountain in western Franklin County and flows generally eastwardly through Franklin and Pittsylvania Counties, past the town of Rocky Mount. It joins the Roanoke River from the south (along a section of the Roanoke often known locally as the Staunton River) as part of the Leesville Reservoir, which is formed by a dam on the Roanoke.

Recently, several dams across the Pigg River have been removed. In 2017, the 100 year old power dam at Rocky Mount was breached to restore the historic flow and to improve the habitat of the Roanoke logperch, an endangered species. Other dams removed recently include the dam near the Rocky Mount Veterans Memorial Park in 2013, and the Wasena dam in 2009.

The river is named for John Pigg, an early settler from Amelia County, Virginia, who in 1741 acquired 400 acres of land through which the unnamed river passed.

== See also ==
- List of Virginia rivers
