= Red Oak Hollow, Virginia =

Unincorporated community in Virginia, US

Coordinates: 36°43′35″N 79°11′45″W

Red Oak Hollow is an unincorporated community in Pittsylvania County, in the U.S. state of Virginia.
