= John Donelson =

American explorer and adventurer

- Born: 17 March 1718
- Died: 17 November 1785 (aged 67)
- Occupations: frontiersman, ironmaster, politician, city planner, explorer
- Spouse: Rachel Stockley Donelson
- Children: 11, Jane Donelson Hays, Mary Donelson Caffery, Rachel Jackson, plus another sister and seven brothers
- Relatives: Andrew Jackson (son-in-law); Daniel Smith Donelson; John Donelson Martin

John Donelson (1718–1785) was an American frontiersman, ironmaster, politician, city planner, and explorer. After founding and operating what became Washington Iron Furnace in Franklin County, Virginia for several years, he moved with his family to Middle Tennessee which was on the developing frontier. There, together with James Robertson, Donelson co-founded the frontier settlement of Fort Nashborough. This later developed as the city of Nashville, Tennessee.

Donelson and his wife Rachel had eleven children, four of them girls. Their tenth was daughter Rachel, whose second husband Andrew Jackson was elected the seventh president of the United States in 1828.

== Career ==
Donelson served in the Virginia House of Burgesses. From about 1770 to 1779, he operated the Washington Iron Furnace at Rocky Mount, Franklin County, Virginia.

He next moved to the Watauga settlements on the Holston and Watauga rivers in Washington District, North Carolina. They came into conflict with the Overhill Cherokee on the far side of the Appalachians. Because of armed conflict and flooding in his settlement, Donelson temporarily moved his family to safer areas in Kentucky.

Along with James Robertson who traveled the overland route, Donelson and a large number of pioneers traveled down the Tennessee and other rivers in excess of 1,000 miles to Middle Tennessee, where they co-founded Fort Nashborough, in 1780. This eventually developed as the city of Nashville, Tennessee. A collection of his diaries are kept in Cleveland Hall, in Nashville.

Immediately prior to his death, Donelson was serving as a U.S. Indian commissioner "traveling to the Southeastern nations, including the towns of the Chickamauga Cherokees, endeavoring to negotiate a peace that would deliver the Cumberland settlements from the ongoing siege."

== Personal life ==
Donelson married Rachel (née Stockley) (1730–1801) in 1744. They had eleven children, including four daughters who married well and had descendants who became prominent military men and politicians.

Youngest daughter Rachel first married Lewis Robards in 1787; she later married Andrew Jackson of Tennessee. He was elected president of the United States in 1828. She died in December of that year, shortly before he was inaugurated in January 1829.

Daughter Mary Donelson married Captain John Caffery, and two of their descendants served in national political office.

=== Family political legacy ===
Several of John and Rachel's descendants were elected to political office. Their great-grandson, Donelson Caffery II (1835–1906), served one term as a Louisiana State Senator and two terms as a U.S. Senator from Louisiana. He was elected to that office by the state legislature, as was customary at the time. In 1896 he was the first nominee for president of the "Democratic National Party" but declined the nomination. In 1900, he was nominated to head the presidential ticket of the "National Party" but declined that nomination as well.

The Donelsons' great-great-great grandson, attorney Patrick Thomson Caffery (1932–2013), served one term as a Louisiana state representative (1964–1968), and two terms as a United States representative from Louisiana's 3rd congressional district (1969–1973). He retired from Congress to resume the practice of law.

== Death and legacy ==
Donelson was shot and killed in 1785 by an unknown person on the banks of the Barren River. He was en route to Mansker's Station after a business trip. One Jackson scholar says he was killed "by the Indians" and Notable Southern Families states "he was shot from ambush, by an Indian, and killed." Another account has a more detailed report: "While in the company of John Telly and a man named Leach, he was wounded in the abdomen and one of his knees, just after passing the Big Spring. He had Leach to push in his protruding bowels, and soon ate heartily of bread and buffalo tongue, and died within an hour after. He was buried near the spring."

Donelson, Tennessee was named in his honor.

== Descendants ==
The Donelson family of Tennessee left by John Donelson had an outsize impact on the history of the U.S. South thanks in part to daughter Rachel's marriage to Andrew Jackson.

== See also ==
- Cherokee–American wars
- Sycamore Shoals
- Wards of Andrew Jackson
- Andrew Jackson and the slave trade in the United States
- Andrew Jackson and land speculation in the United States
- Spoils system

== Sources ==
- Caffery, Charles S. (n.d.). The Caffery Family, 1737–1900 (PDF). n.pub. OCLC 15049793.
- Crabb, Alfred Leland (1957). Journey to Nashville: A Story of the Founding. New York: Bobbs-Merrill.
- Cheathem, Mark R. (2007). Old Hickory's Nephew: The Political and Private Struggles of Andrew Jackson Donelson. Southern Biography Series. Baton Rouge: Louisiana State University Press. ISBN 978-0-8071-3238-8. LCCN 2006024951. OCLC 70866891. Project MUSE book 16672.
- Donelson, John (1779). "Journal of a voyage, intended by God's Permission, in the good Boat Adventure, from Fort Patrick Henry on Holston river to the French Salt Springs on Cumberland River, kept by John Donaldson" (PDF). Tennessee State Library and Archives.
- Gismondi, Melissa (June 12, 2017). Rachel Jackson and the Search for Zion, 1760s–1830s (PhD, History thesis). Charlottesville, Virginia: University of Virginia. doi:10.18130/v3q364.
- Inman, Natalie R. (2017). "4. The Donelsons: Social, Political, and Economic Expansion on the Frontier". Brothers and Friends: Kinship in Early America. Early American Spaces. University of Georgia Press. doi:10.1353/book51901. ISBN 978-0-8203-5110-0. LCCN 2016055415. OCLC 985105661.
- Whitaker, A. P. (December 1926). "The Muscle Shoals Speculation, 1783–1789". The Mississippi Valley Historical Review. 13 (3): 365. doi:10.2307/1893112.
