= 1788–89 United States presidential election in Virginia =

- January 7, 1789
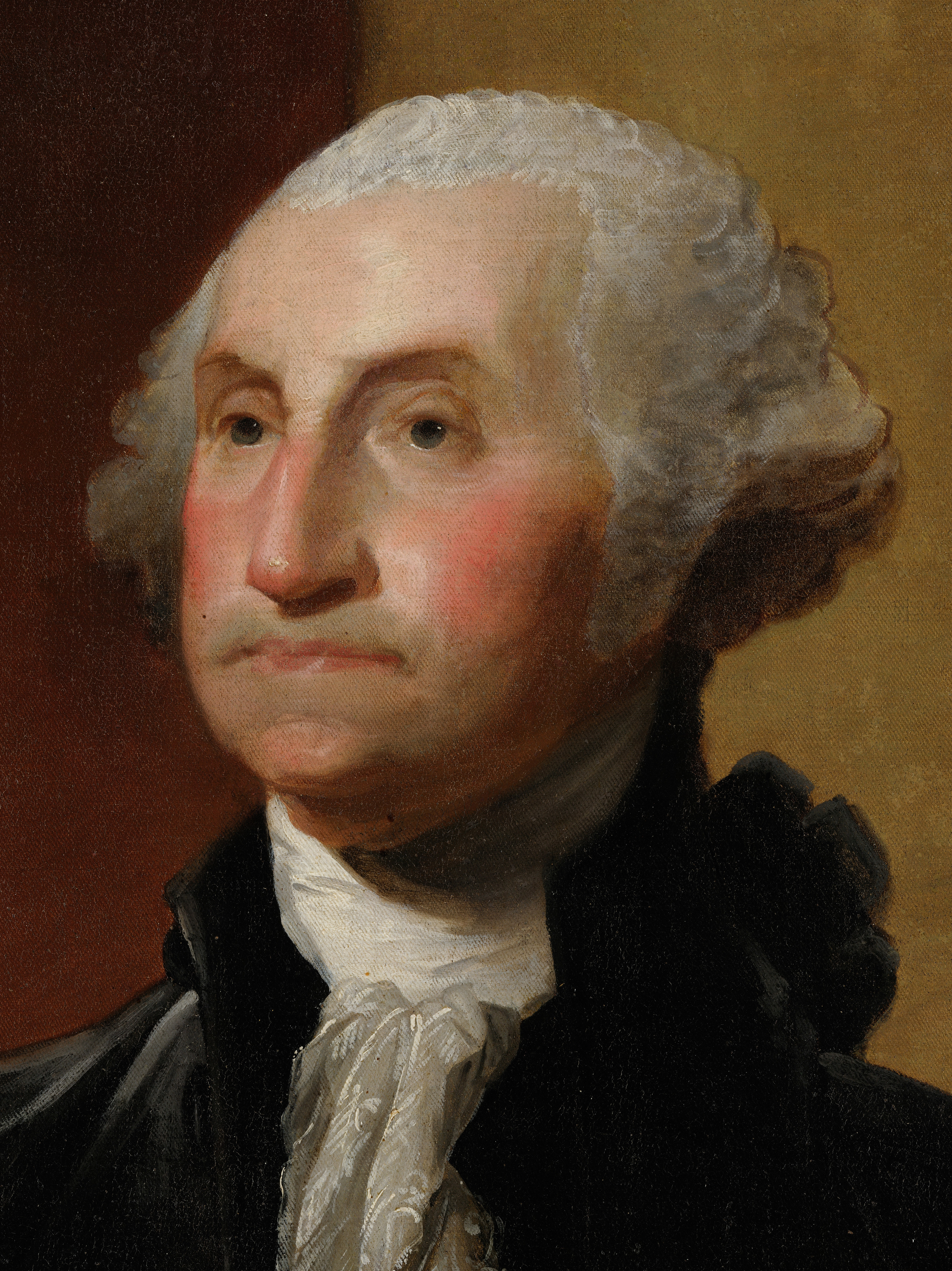

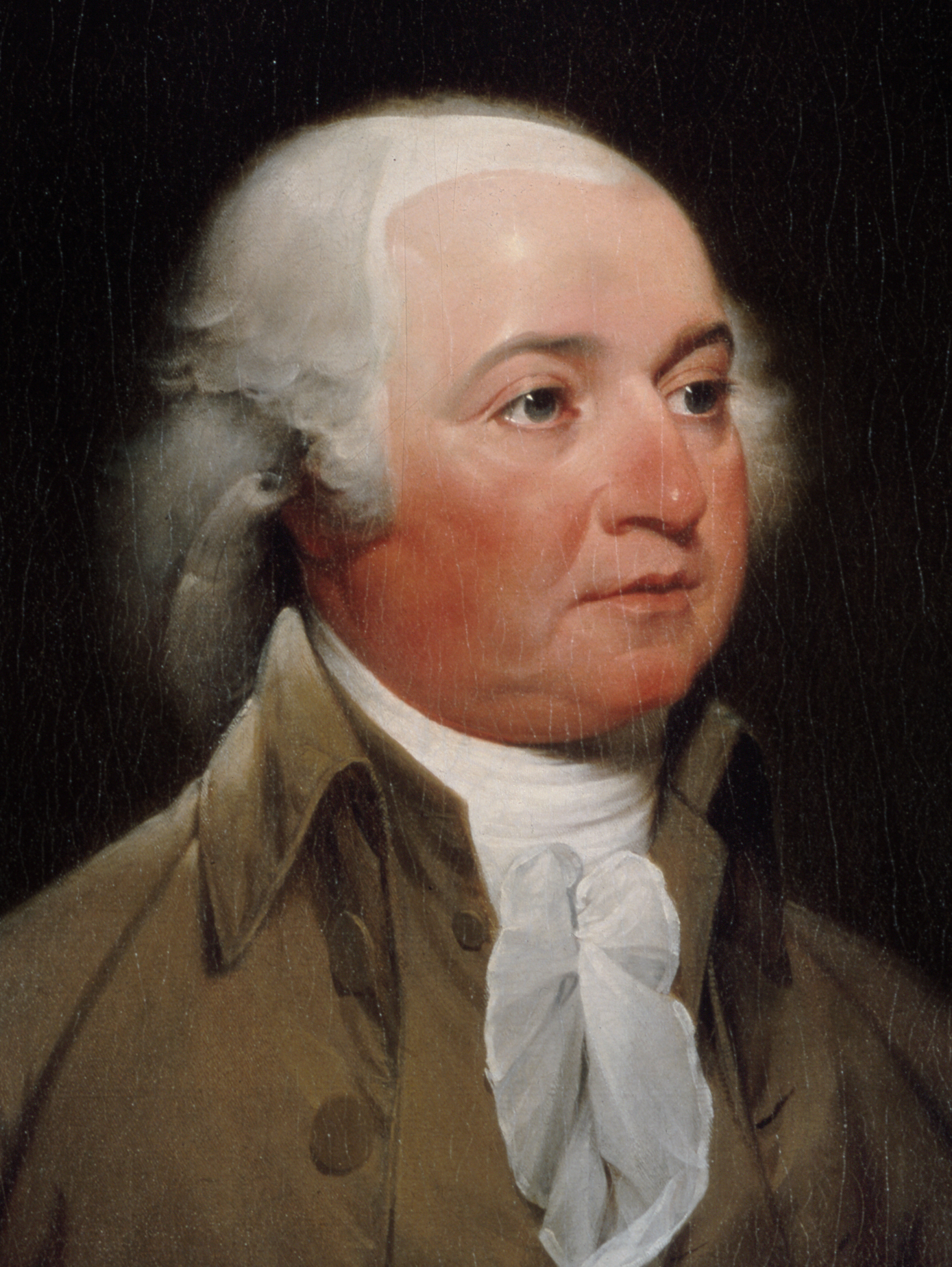

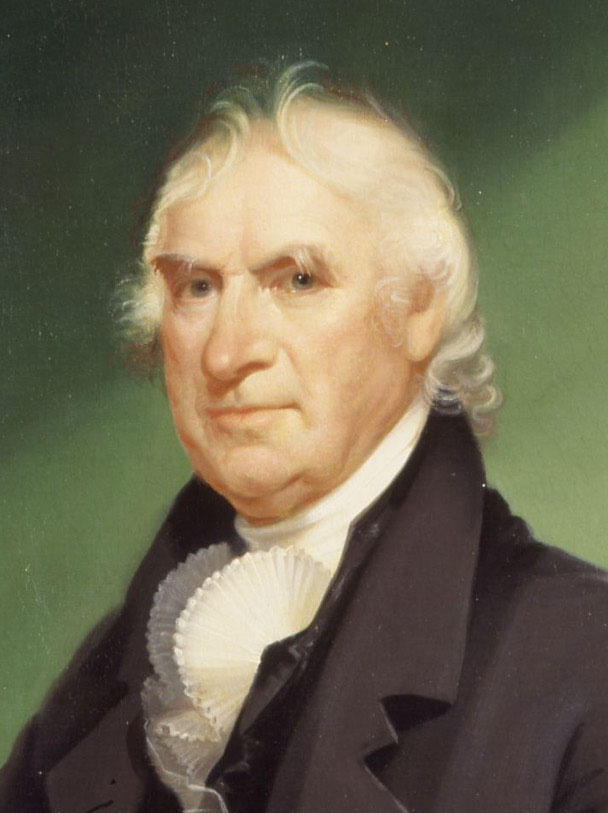

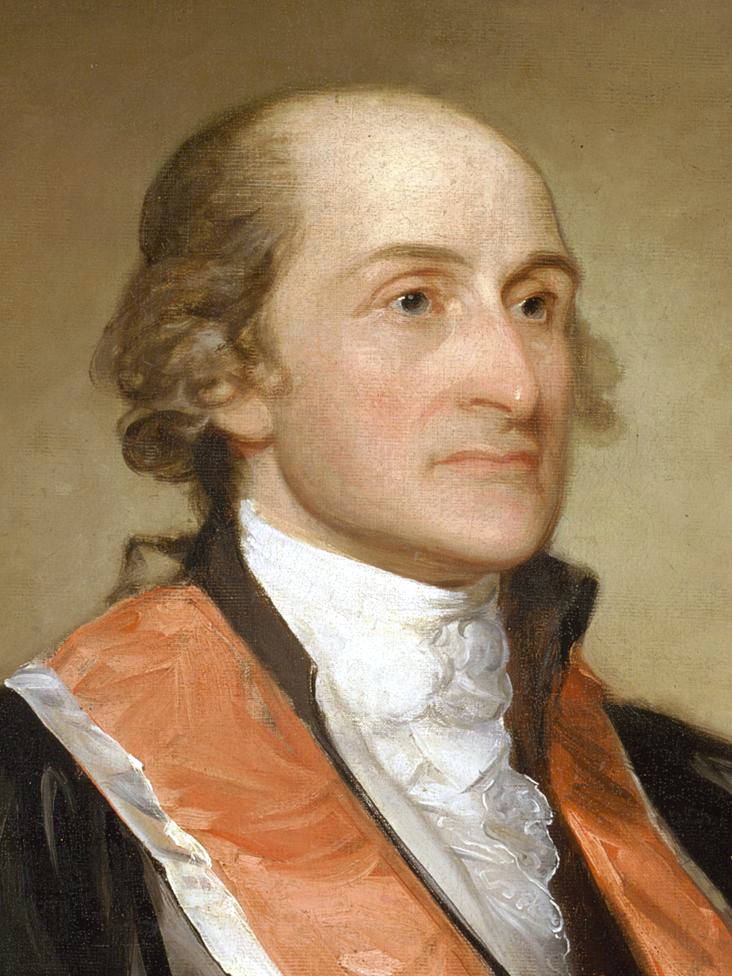

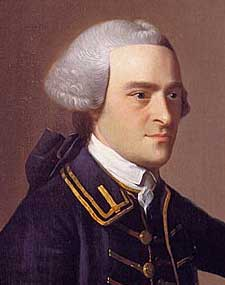
Nominee	George Washington	John Adams	George Clinton
Party	Independent	Federalists	Anti-Federalists
Home state	Virginia	Massachusetts	New York
Electoral vote	10 (12)	5	3
Popular vote	3,428	–	–
Percentage	100.00%	–	–
Nominee	John Jay	John Hancock
Party	Federalists	Federalists
Home state	New York	Massachusetts
Electoral vote	1	1
Popular vote	–	–
Percentage	–	–
County results
Washington (Federalist electors)
60-70%
70–80%
80–90%
90-100%
Washington (Anti-Federalist electors)
50-60%
60-70%
80-90%
90-100%
President before election
Office established
Elected President
George Washington
Independent

A presidential election was held in Virginia on January 7, 1789, as part of the 1788–1789 United States presidential election to elect the first President. Voters chose 12 representatives, or electors to the Electoral College, who voted for President and Vice President. However, one elector did not vote, and another elector was not chosen because an election district failed to submit returns, resulting in only 10 electoral votes being submitted.

Virginia unanimously voted for nonpartisan candidate and commander-in-chief of the Continental Army George Washington. The total popular vote is composed of 4,640 for Federalist electors and 1,737 for Anti-Federalist electors, all of whom were supportive of Washington. The Anti-Federalists actively contested the election, nominating and circulating a list of twelve electors in opposition to the Federalist candidates. The total number of votes is incomplete.

== Results by presidential candidates ==
1788-89 United States presidential election in Virginia
Party	Candidate	Votes	%
Independent	George Washington	3,428	100.00%
Total votes		3,428	100.00%

=== Results by county ===
1788–89 United States presidential election in Virginia
County	George Washington Independent		Margin		Total (Note: Results for George Washington are taken from all electors with either a formal ticket pledge, or a submitted electoral vote, for each county.)
County	#	%	#	%	Total
Accomack	No data		No data		
Albemarle	109	100.00%	109	100.00%	109
Amelia	No data		No data		
Amherst	No data		No data		
Augusta	353	100.00%	353	100.00%	353
Bedford	-	100.00%	-	100.00%	-
Berkeley	39	100.00%	39	100.00%	39
Botetourt	47	100.00%	47	100.00%	47
Bourbon	No data		No data		
Brunswick	140	100.00%	140	100.00%	140
Buckingham	4	100.00%	4	100.00%	4
Campbell	-	100.00%	-	100.00%	-
Caroline	No data		No data		
Charles City	-	100.00%	-	100.00%	-
Charlotte	-	100.00%	-	100.00%	-
Chesterfield	No data		No data		
Culpeper	177	100.00%	177	100.00%	177
Cumberland	108	100.00%	108	100.00%	108
Dinwiddie	No data		No data		
Elizabeth City	-	100.00%	-	100.00%	-
Essex	145	100.00%	145	100.00%	145
Fairfax	218	100.00%	218	100.00%	218
Fauquier	101	100.00%	101	100.00%	101
Fayette	No data		No data		
Fluvanna	15	100.00%	15	100.00%	15
Franklin	-	100.00%	-	100.00%	-
Frederick	119	100.00%	119	100.00%	119
Gloucester	-	100.00%	-	100.00%	-
Goochland	-	100.00%	-	100.00%	-
Greenbrier	70	100.00%	70	100.00%	70
Greensville	53	100.00%	53	100.00%	53
Halifax	-	100.00%	-	100.00%	-
Hampshire	37	100.00%	37	100.00%	37
Hanover	No data		No data		
Hardy	91	100.00%	91	100.00%	91
Harrison	No data		No data		
Henrico	-	100.00%	-	100.00%	-
Henry	-	100.00%	-	100.00%	-
Isle of Wight	No votes		No votes		
James City	-	100.00%	-	100.00%	-
Jefferson	No data		No data		
King and Queen	No data		No data		
King George	No data		No data		
King William	No data		No data		
Lancaster	No data		No data		
Lincoln	No data		No data		
Loudoun	No data		No data		
Louisa	-	100.00%	-	100.00%	-
Lunenburg	No data		No data		
Madison	No data		No data		
Mecklenburg	No data		No data		
Mercer	No data		No data		
Middlesex	-	100.00%	-	100.00%	-
Monongalia	66	100.00%	66	100.00%	66
Montgomery	No data		No data		
Nansemond	No data		No data		
Nelson	No data		No data		
New Kent	-	100.00%	-	100.00%	-
Norfolk	186	100.00%	186	100.00%	186
Northampton	No data		No data		
Northumberland	No data		No data		
Ohio	No data		No data		
Orange	113	100.00%	113	100.00%	113
Pendleton	101	100.00%	101	100.00%	101
Pittsylvania	-	100.00%	-	100.00%	-
Powhatan	10	100.00%	10	100.00%	10
Prince Edward	-	100.00%	-	100.00%	-
Prince George	No votes		No votes		
Prince William	No data		No data		
Princess Anne	280	100.00%	280	100.00%	280
Randolph	67	100.00%	67	100.00%	67
Richmond	No data		No data		
Rockbridge	175	100.00%	175	100.00%	175
Rockingham	No data		No data		
Russell	47	100.00%	47	100.00%	47
Shenandoah	166	100.00%	166	100.00%	166
Southampton	No votes		No votes		
Spotsylvania	268	100.00%	268	100.00%	268
Stafford	No data		No data		
Surry	No votes		No votes		
Sussex	No votes		No votes		
Warwick	-	100.00%	-	100.00%	-
Washington	123	100.00%	123	100.00%	123
Westmoreland	No votes		No votes		
York	-	100.00%	-	100.00%	-
Total	3,428	100.00%	3,428	100.00%	3,428

=== Results by district ===
1788-89 United States presidential election in Virginia
District	E.V.	George Washington Independent			Margin		Total (Note: Results for George Washington are taken from all electors with either a formal ticket pledge, or a submitted electoral vote, for each district.)
District	E.V.	#	%	E.V.	#	%	Total
1st	1	311	100.00%	1	311	100.00%	311
2nd	1	-	100.00%	1	-	100.00%	-
3rd	1	1,082	100.00%	1	1,082	100.00%	1,082
4th	1	145	100.00%	1	145	100.00%	145
5th	1	319	100.00%	1	319	100.00%	319
6th	1	No votes		0	No votes		
7th	1	419	100.00%	1	419	100.00%	419
8th	1	466	100.00%	1	466	100.00%	466
9th	1	No votes		0	No votes		
10th	1	-	100.00%	1	-	100.00%	-
11th	1	686	100.00%	1	686	100.00%	686
12th	1	-	100.00%	1	-	100.00%	-
Total	12	3,428	100.00%	10	3,428	100.00%	3,428

== Results by presidential electors ==
1788-89 United States presidential election in Virginia
Party	Candidate	Votes	%
Federalists	Federalists electors	4,635	71.52%
Anti-Federalists	Anti-Federalists electors	1,850	28.48%
Total votes		6,495	100.00%

=== Results by county ===
1788–89 United States presidential election in Virginia
County	Federalists electors		Anti-Federalists electors		Margin		Total (Note: Some county results are missing or incomplete.)
County	#	%	#	%	#	%	Total
Accomack	216	98.18%	4	1.82%	212	96.36%	220
Albemarle	109	60.56%	71	39.44%	38	21.12%	180
Amelia	No data		No data		No data		
Amherst	0	0.00%	270	100.00%	-270	-100.00%	270
Augusta	353	100.00%	0	0.00%	353	100.00%	353
Bedford	-	0.00%	-	100.00%	-	-100.00%	-
Berkeley	239	100.00%	0	0.00%	239	100.00%	239
Botetourt	47	42.73%	63	57.27%	-16	-14.54%	110
Bourbon	No data		No data		No data		
Brunswick	35	20.00%	140	80.00%	-105	-60.00%	175
Buckingham	4	2.48%	157	97.52%	-153	-95.04%	161
Campbell	-	0.00%	-	100.00%	-	-100.00%	-
Caroline	No data		No data		No data		
Charles City	-	100.00%	-	0.00%	-	100.00%	-
Charlotte	-	0.00%	-	100.00%	-	-100.00%	-
Chesterfield	No data		No data		No data		
Culpeper	177	87.19%	26	12.81%	151	74.38%	203
Cumberland	83	34.16%	160	65.84%	-77	-31.68%	243
Dinwiddie	No data		No data		No data		
Elizabeth City	-	100.00%	-	0.00%	-	100.00%	-
Essex	5	2.81%	173	97.19%	-168	-94.38%	178
Fairfax	234	100.00%	0	0.00%	234	100.00%	234
Fauquier	109	100.00%	0	0.00%	109	100.00%	109
Fayette	No data		No data		No data		
Fluvanna	15	18.52%	66	81.48%	-51	-62.96%	81
Franklin	-	0.00%	-	100.00%	-	-100.00%	-
Frederick	120	100.00%	0	0.00%	120	100.00%	120
Gloucester	-	100.00%	-	0.00%	-	100.00%	-
Goochland	-	100.00%	-	0.00%	-	100.00%	-
Greenbrier	70	100.00%	0	0.00%	70	100.00%	70
Greensville	37	41.11%	53	58.89%	-16	-17.78%	90
Halifax	-	0.00%	-	100.00%	-	-100.00%	-
Hampshire	43	100.00%	0	0.00%	43	100.00%	43
Hanover	No data		No data		No data		
Hardy	91	98.91%	1	1.09%	90	97.82%	92
Harrison	0	0.00%	112	100.00%	-112	-100.00%	112
Henrico	-	100.00%	-	0.00%	-	100.00%	-
Henry	-	0.00%	-	100.00%	-	-100.00%	-
Isle of Wight	209	74.38%	72	25.62%	137	48.76%	281
James City	-	100.00%	-	0.00%	-	100.00%	-
Jefferson	No data		No data		No data		
King and Queen	No data		No data		No data		
King George	No data		No data		No data		
King William	No data		No data		No data		
Lancaster	No data		No data		No data		
Lincoln	No data		No data		No data		
Loudoun	-	100.00%	-	0.00%	-	100.00%	-
Louisa	-	100.00%	-	0.00%	-	100.00%	-
Lunenburg	No data		No data		No data		
Madison	No data		No data		No data		
Mecklenburg	No data		No data		No data		
Mercer	No data		No data		No data		
Middlesex	-	100.00%	-	0.00%	-	100.00%	-
Monongalia	77	100.00%	0	0.00%	77	100.00%	77
Montgomery	0	0.00%	57	100.00%	-57	-100.00%	57
Nansemond	-	100.00%	-	0.00%	-	100.00%	-
Nelson	No data		No data		No data		
New Kent	-	100.00%	-	0.00%	-	100.00%	-
Norfolk	186	100.00%	0	0.00%	186	100.00%	186
Northampton	1	0.85%	117	99.15%	-116	-98.30%	118
Northumberland	No data		No data		No data		
Ohio	68	100.00%	0	0.00%	68	100.00%	68
Orange	113	96.58%	4	3.42%	109	93.16%	117
Pendleton	101	100.00%	0	0.00%	101	100.00%	101
Pittsylvania	-	0.00%	-	100.00%	-	-100.00%	-
Powhatan	95	90.48%	10	9.52%	85	80.96%	105
Prince Edward	-	0.00%	-	100.00%	-	-100.00%	-
Prince George	8	5.23%	145	94.77%	-137	-89.54%	153
Prince William	-	100.00%	-	0.00%	-	100.00%	-
Princess Anne	280	100.00%	0	0.00%	280	100.00%	280
Randolph	67	100.00%	0	0.00%	67	100.00%	67
Richmond	No data		No data		No data		
Rockbridge	175	100.00%	0	0.00%	175	100.00%	175
Rockingham	No data		No data		No data		
Russell	47	100.00%	0	0.00%	47	100.00%	47
Shenandoah	166	100.00%	0	0.00%	166	100.00%	166
Southampton	363	99.18%	3	0.82%	360	98.36%	366
Spotsylvania	268	96.40%	10	3.60%	258	92.80%	278
Stafford	No data		No data		No data		
Surry	133	97.79%	3	2.21%	130	95.58%	136
Sussex	63	32.14%	133	67.86%	-70	-35.72%	196
Warwick	-	100.00%	-	0.00%	-	100.00%	-
Washington	123	100.00%	0	0.00%	123	100.00%	123
Westmoreland	115	100.00%	0	0.00%	115	100.00%	115
York	-	100.00%	-	0.00%	-	100.00%	-
Total	4,645	71.52%	1,850	28.48%	2,795	43.04%	6,495

=== Results by district ===
1788-89 United States presidential election in Virginia
District	E.V.	Federalists electors			Anti-Federalists electors			Margin		Total (Note: Some district results are missing or incomplete.)
District	E.V.	#	%	E.V.	#	%	E.V.	#	%	Total
1st	1	250	40.78%	0	363	59.22%	1	-113	-18.44%	613
2nd	1	-	100.00%	1	-	0.00%	0	-	100.00%	-
3rd	1	1,082	90.02%	1	120	9.98%	0	962	80.04%	1,202
4th	1	5	2.81%	0	173	97.19%	1	-168	-94.38%	178
5th	1	343	100.00%	1	0	0.00%	0	343	100.00%	343
6th	1	115	100.00%	0	0	0.00%	0	115	100.00%	115
7th	1	705	86.19%	1	113	13.81%	0	592	72.38%	818
8th	1	683	84.95%	1	121	15.05%	0	562	69.90%	804
9th	1	776	68.55%	0	356	31.45%	0	420	37.10%	1,132
10th	1	-	0.00%	0	-	100.00%	1	-	-100.00%	-
11th	1	686	53.18%	1	604	46.82%	0	82	6.36%	1,290
12th	1	-	100.00%	1	-	0.00%	0	-	100.00%	-
Total	12	4,645	71.52%	7	1,850	28.48%	3	2,795	43.04%	6,495

=== Results by elector ===
1788-89 United States presidential election in Virginia's 1st congressional district
Party	Candidate	Votes	%
Anti-Federalists	John Pride (Note: Anti-federalists elector this election.) (Note: Voted against the adoption the new federal constitution of the United States.)	311	50.65%
Federalists	Edward Carrington (Note: Federalist elector for this election.)	249	40.55%
Anti-Federalists	Theodorick Bland	52	8.47%
Unknown	Mayo Carrington	1	0.16%
Federalists	William Ronald (Note: Voted in support of the adoption the new federal constitution of the United States.)	1	0.16%
Total votes		614	100.00%

1788-89 United States presidential election in Virginia's 2nd congressional district
Party	Candidate	Votes	%
Federalists	John Harvie (Note: Federalists elector this election.)	-	100.00%
Total votes		-	100.00%

1788-89 United States presidential election in Virginia's 3rd congressional district
Party	Candidate	Votes	%
Federalists	Zachariah Johnston	1,082	90.02%
Anti-Federalists	Thomas Madison (Note: Explicitly described as being Zachariah Johnston's opponent for this election.)	120	9.98%
Total votes		1,202	100.00%

1788-89 United States presidential election in Virginia's 4th congressional district
Party	Candidate	Votes	%
Anti-Federalists	John Roane	145	70.05%
Anti-Federalists	Meriwether Smith	28	13.53%
Unknown	Robert Gilchrist	26	12.56%
Federalists	Carter Braxton (Note: Federalist correspondent and supporter of the new federal constitution in 1789.)	4	1.93%
Unknown	Henry Kidd	3	1.45%
Federalists	Edmund Pendleton	1	0.48%
Total votes		207	100.00%

1788-89 United States presidential election in Virginia's 5th congressional district
Party	Candidate	Votes	%
Federalists	David Stuart	319	92.73%
Federalists	Thomas Blackburn (Note: Federalist partisan in politics.)	24	6.98%
Unknown	Elias Edmonds	1	0.29%
Total votes		344	100.00%

1788-89 United States presidential election in Virginia's 6th congressional district
Party	Candidate	Votes	%
Federalists	William Fitzhugh (Note: The electoral vote from this elected candidate was never submitted or recorded.)	115	96.64%
Unknown	John Rowe	4	3.36%
Total votes		119	100.00%

1788-89 United States presidential election in Virginia's 7th congressional district
Party	Candidate	Votes	%
Federalists	James Wood (Note: Federalist elector for this election.)	419	50.12%
Federalists	William Darke (Note: Federalist elector for this election.)	275	32.89%
Anti-Federalists	Robert Rutherford (Note: Anti-federalist elctor for this election. Nicknamed "Bob" Rutherford in some records.)	113	13.52%
Unknown	William Haymond	18	2.15%
Federalists	Ebenezer Zane	7	0.84%
Federalists	Alexander White	4	0.48%
Total votes		836	100.00%

1788-89 United States presidential election in Virginia's 8th congressional district
Party	Candidate	Votes	%
Federalists	Anthony Walke	466	54.57%
Federalists	Isaac Avery (Note: Federalist elector for this eleciton. Federalist candidate for the 1st United States Congress (1789-1791).)	194	22.72%
Anti-Federalists	Henry Guy (Note: Anti-federalist candidate for the Virginia House of Representatives in 1788, 1789, and 1790.)	117	13.70%
Unknown	Thomas Newton Jr.	30	3.51%
Unknown	Joseph Godwin	18	2.11%
Federalists	Thomas Mathews	16	1.87%
Federalists	George Parker	6	0.70%
Anti-Federalists	Edmund Curtis	3	0.35%
Unknown	George Kelly	1	0.12%
Unknown	John Robins	1	0.12%
Anti-Federalists	Josiah Parker (Note: Anti-Administration representative for the 1st United States Congress.)	1	0.12%
Federalists	Littleton Eyre	1	0.12%
Total votes		854	100.00%

1788-89 United States presidential election in Virginia's 9th congressional district
Party	Candidate	Votes	%
Federalists	Samuel Kello (Note: The electoral vote from this candidate was never submitted or recorded. Due to incomplete returns, a winner could not be certified.)	776	68.49%
Anti-Federalists	Joseph Jones	356	31.42%
Unknown	Benjamin Riggan	1	0.09%
Total votes		1,133	100.00%

1788-89 United States presidential election in Virginia's 10th congressional district
Party	Candidate	Votes	%
Anti-Federalists	Patrick Henry	-	100.00%
Total votes		-	100.00%

1788-89 United States presidential election in Virginia's 11th congressional district
Party	Candidate	Votes	%
Federalists	Edward Stevens	686	53.18%
Anti-Federalists	William Cabell Sr.	604	46.82%
Total votes		1,290	100.00%

1788-89 United States presidential election in Virginia's 12th congressional district
Party	Candidate	Votes	%
Federalists	Warner Lewis	-	100.00%
Total votes		-	100.00%

== Electors ==
The following served as electors: -

- John Pride - previously voted against ratification of the Constitution.
- John Harvie
- Zachariah Johnston - Augusta County, Botetourt County, Bourbon County, Fayette County, Greenbrier County, Jefferson County, Lincoln County, Madison County, Mercer County, Montgomery County, Nelson County, Pendleton County, Rockbridge County, Rockingham County, Russell County, Shenandoah County, Washington County
- John Roane - one of the three Clinton electors
- David Stuart
- William Fitzhugh
- Anthony Walke, Princess Anne Co.
- Patrick Henry - previously voted against ratification of the Constitution.
- Edward Stevens
- Warner Lewis – did not attend the electoral college meeting.
- James Wood

== See also ==
- United States presidential elections in Virginia

== Works cited ==
- Jensen, Merrill; Becker, Robert, eds. (1976). The First Federal Elections 1788-1790: Congress, South Carolina, Pennsylvania, Massachusetts, New Hampshire. Vol. 1. University of Wisconsin Press. ISBN 0299066908.
