= 1792 United States presidential election in Virginia =

- November 2 – December 5, 1792
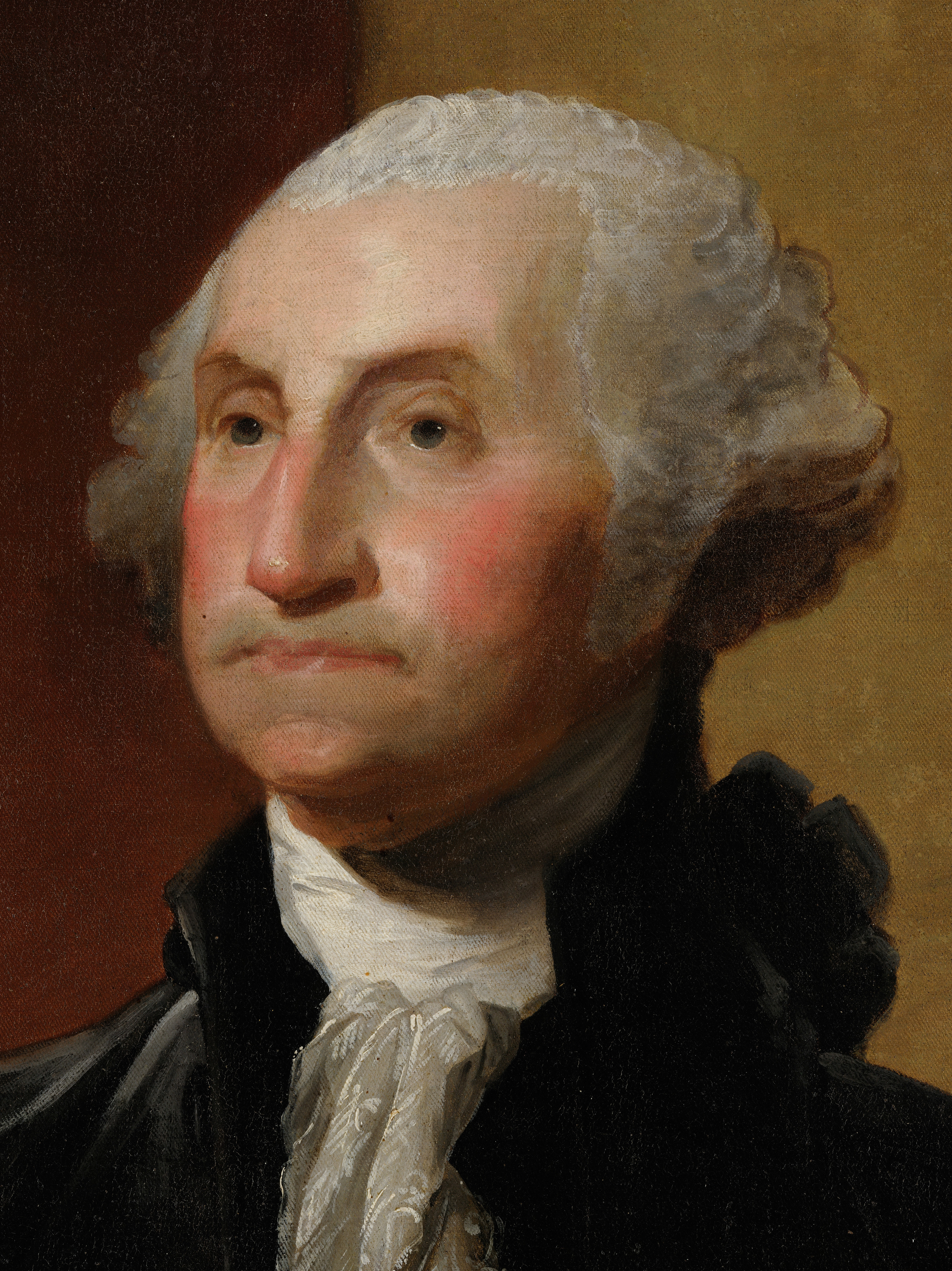

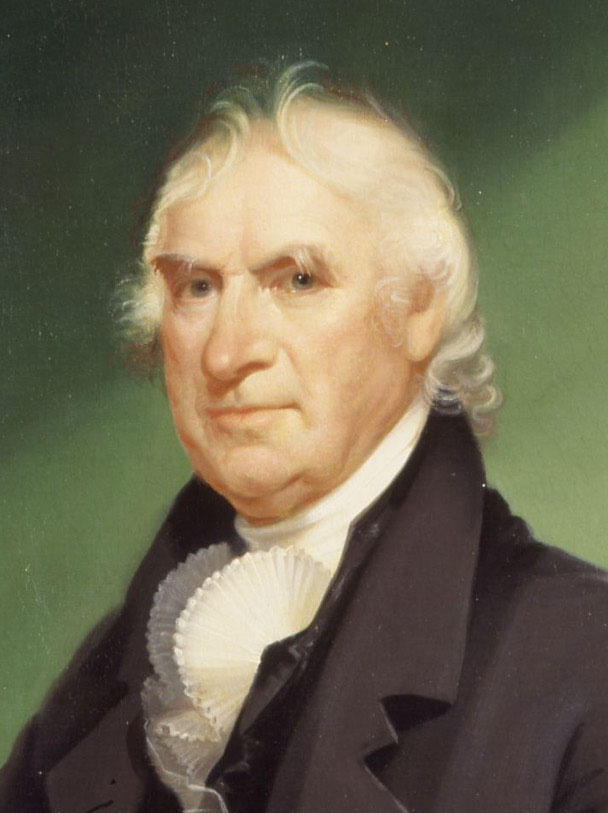
| Nominee | George Washington | George Clinton |
| Party | Independent | Democratic-Republican |
| Home state | Virginia | New York |
| Electoral vote | 21 | 21 |
| Popular vote | 962 |
| Percentage | 100.00% |
County results
Washington/Clinton (Democratic-Republican)
100%
President before election
George Washington
Independent
Elected President
George Washington
Independent

A presidential election was held in Virginia between November 2 and December 5, 1792, as part of the 1792 United States presidential election. Virginia's 21 electors each cast one vote for the incumbent, George Washington, and one vote for John Adams, the incumbent Vice President.

Virginia unanimously voted for independent candidate and incumbent president, George Washington. The total vote is composed of 962 for Democratic-Republican electors, all of whom were supportive of Washington and George Clinton. The total for Virginia appears to be incomplete.

== Results by presidential candidates ==
1792 United States presidential election in Virginia
| Party | Candidate | Votes | % |
|---|---|---|---|
| Independent | George Washington | 962 | 100.00% |
| Total votes | | 962 | 100.00% |

=== Results by county ===
1792 United States presidential election in Virginia
| County | George Washington Independent | | Margin | | Total (Note: Results for George Washington are taken from all electors with either a formal ticket pledge, or a submitted electoral vote, for each county.) |
| County | # | % | # | % | Total |
|---|---|---|---|---|---|
| Accomack | No data | | No data | | |
| Albemarle | 7 | 100.00% | 7 | 100.00% | 7 |
| Amelia | 93 | 100.00% | 93 | 100.00% | 93 |
| Amherst | No data | | No data | | |
| Augusta | - | 100.00% | - | 100.00% | - |
| Bedford | - | 100.00% | - | 100.00% | - |
| Berkeley | 371 | 100.00% | 371 | 100.00% | 371 |
| Botetourt | No data | | No data | | |
| Brunswick | 203 | 100.00% | 203 | 100.00% | 203 |
| Buckingham | - | 100.00% | - | 100.00% | - |
| Campbell | - | 100.00% | - | 100.00% | - |
| Caroline | - | 100.00% | - | 100.00% | - |
| Charles City | - | 100.00% | - | 100.00% | - |
| Charlotte | - | 100.00% | - | 100.00% | - |
| Chesterfield | No data | | No data | | |
| Culpeper | No data | | No data | | |
| Cumberland | - | 100.00% | - | 100.00% | - |
| Dinwiddie | No data | | No data | | |
| Elizabeth City | - | 100.00% | - | 100.00% | - |
| Essex | 9 | 100.00% | 9 | 100.00% | 9 |
| Fairfax | - | 100.00% | - | 100.00% | - |
| Fauquier | 19 | 100.00% | 19 | 100.00% | 19 |
| Fluvanna | No data | | No data | | |
| Franklin | - | 100.00% | - | 100.00% | - |
| Frederick | 3 | 100.00% | 3 | 100.00% | 3 |
| Gloucester | No data | | No data | | |
| Goochland | No data | | No data | | |
| Greenbrier | No data | | No data | | |
| Greensville | - | 100.00% | - | 100.00% | - |
| Halifax | - | 100.00% | - | 100.00% | - |
| Hampshire | No data | | No data | | |
| Hanover | - | 100.00% | - | 100.00% | - |
| Hardy | No data | | No data | | |
| Harrison | No data | | No data | | |
| Henrico | - | 100.00% | - | 100.00% | - |
| Henry | - | 100.00% | - | 100.00% | - |
| Isle of Wight | - | 100.00% | - | 100.00% | - |
| James City | - | 100.00% | - | 100.00% | - |
| King and Queen | No data | | No data | | |
| King George | No data | | No data | | |
| King William | No data | | No data | | |
| Lancaster | 14 | 100.00% | 14 | 100.00% | 14 |
| Loudoun | No data | | No data | | |
| Louisa | 50 | 100.00% | 50 | 100.00% | 50 |
| Lunenburg | - | 100.00% | - | 100.00% | - |
| Matthews | No data | | No data | | |
| Mecklenburg | No data | | No data | | |
| Middlesex | No data | | No data | | |
| Monongalia | No data | | No data | | |
| Montgomery | - | 100.00% | - | 100.00% | - |
| Nansemond | - | 100.00% | - | 100.00% | - |
| New Kent | - | 100.00% | - | 100.00% | - |
| Norfolk | - | 100.00% | - | 100.00% | - |
| Northampton | No data | | No data | | |
| Northumberland | No data | | No data | | |
| Nottoway | No data | | No data | | |
| Ohio | No data | | No data | | |
| Orange | No data | | No data | | |
| Patrick | - | 100.00% | - | 100.00% | - |
| Pendleton | 38 | 100.00% | 38 | 100.00% | 38 |
| Pittsylvania | - | 100.00% | - | 100.00% | - |
| Powhatan | 89 | 100.00% | 89 | 100.00% | 89 |
| Prince Edward | - | 100.00% | - | 100.00% | - |
| Prince George | - | 100.00% | - | 100.00% | - |
| Prince William | - | 100.00% | - | 100.00% | - |
| Princess Anne | 51 | 100.00% | 51 | 100.00% | 51 |
| Randolph | No data | | No data | | |
| Richmond | No data | | No data | | |
| Rockbridge | No data | | No data | | |
| Rockingham | - | 100.00% | - | 100.00% | - |
| Russell | - | 100.00% | - | 100.00% | - |
| Shenandoah | - | 100.00% | - | 100.00% | - |
| Southampton | - | 100.00% | - | 100.00% | - |
| Spotsylvania | No data | | No data | | |
| Stafford | - | 100.00% | - | 100.00% | - |
| Surry | - | 100.00% | - | 100.00% | - |
| Sussex | - | 100.00% | - | 100.00% | - |
| Warwick | - | 100.00% | - | 100.00% | - |
| Washington | - | 100.00% | - | 100.00% | - |
| Westmoreland | 15 | 100.00% | 15 | 100.00% | 15 |
| Wythe | - | 100.00% | - | 100.00% | - |
| York | - | 100.00% | - | 100.00% | - |
| Total | 962 | 100.00% | 962 | 100.00% | 962 |

=== Results by district ===
1792 United States presidential election in Virginia
| District | E.V. | George Washington Independent | | | Margin | | Total (Note: Results for George Washington are taken from all electors with either a formal ticket pledge, or a submitted electoral vote, for each district.) |
| District | E.V. | # | % | E.V. | # | % | Total |
|---|---|---|---|---|---|---|---|
| Unassigned | 2 | - | - | 2 | - | - | - |
| 1st | 1 | 189 | 100.00% | 1 | 189 | 100.00% | 189 |
| 2nd | 1 | - | 100.00% | 1 | - | 100.00% | - |
| 3rd | 1 | 374 | 100.00% | 1 | 374 | 100.00% | 374 |
| 4th | 1 | 203 | 100.00% | 1 | 203 | 100.00% | 203 |
| 5th | 1 | 19 | 100.00% | 1 | 19 | 100.00% | 19 |
| 6th | 1 | 7 | 100.00% | 1 | 7 | 100.00% | 7 |
| 7th | 1 | - | 100.00% | 1 | - | 100.00% | - |
| 8th | 1 | 50 | 100.00% | 1 | 50 | 100.00% | 50 |
| 9th | 1 | 38 | 100.00% | 1 | 38 | 100.00% | 38 |
| 10th | 1 | 9 | 100.00% | 1 | 9 | 100.00% | 9 |
| 11th | 1 | - | 100.00% | 1 | - | 100.00% | - |
| 12th | 1 | - | 100.00% | 1 | - | 100.00% | - |
| 13th | 1 | 51 | 100.00% | 1 | 51 | 100.00% | 51 |
| 14th | 1 | - | 100.00% | 1 | - | 100.00% | - |
| 15th | 1 | - | 100.00% | 1 | - | 100.00% | - |
| 16th | 1 | - | 100.00% | 1 | - | 100.00% | - |
| 17th | 1 | - | 100.00% | 1 | - | 100.00% | - |
| 18th | 1 | - | 100.00% | 1 | - | 100.00% | - |
| 19th | 1 | 29 | 100.00% | 1 | 29 | 100.00% | 29 |
| Total | 21 | 962 | 100.00% | 21 | 962 | 100.00% | 962 |

== Results by presidential electors ==
1792 United States presidential election in Virginia
| Party | Candidate | Votes | % |
|---|---|---|---|
| Democratic-Republican | Democratic-Republican electors | 1,097 | 95.14% |
| Federalist | Federalist electors | 56 | 4.86% |
| Total votes | | 1,153 | 100.00% |

=== Results by county ===
1792 United States presidential election in Virginia
| County | Democratic-Republican electors | | Federalist electors | | Margin | | Total (Note: Some county results are missing/incomplete.) |
| County | # | % | # | % | # | % | Total |
|---|---|---|---|---|---|---|---|
| Accomack | No data | | No data | | No data | | |
| Albemarle | 7 | 100.00% | 0 | 0.00% | 7 | 100.00% | 7 |
| Amelia | 93 | 75.00% | 31 | 25.00% | 62 | 50.00% | 124 |
| Amherst | No data | | No data | | No data | | |
| Augusta | - | 100.00% | - | 0.00% | - | 100.00% | - |
| Bedford | - | 100.00% | - | 0.00% | - | 100.00% | - |
| Berkeley | 373 | 100.00% | 0 | 0.00% | 373 | 100.00% | 373 |
| Botetourt | No data | | No data | | No data | | |
| Brunswick | 203 | 100.00% | 0 | 0.00% | 203 | 100.00% | 203 |
| Buckingham | - | 100.00% | - | 0.00% | - | 100.00% | - |
| Campbell | - | 100.00% | - | 0.00% | - | 100.00% | - |
| Caroline | - | 100.00% | - | 0.00% | - | 100.00% | - |
| Charles City | - | 100.00% | - | 0.00% | - | 100.00% | - |
| Charlotte | - | 100.00% | - | 0.00% | - | 100.00% | - |
| Chesterfield | No data | | No data | | No data | | |
| Culpeper | No data | | No data | | No data | | |
| Cumberland | - | 100.00% | - | 0.00% | - | 100.00% | - |
| Dinwiddie | No data | | No data | | No data | | |
| Elizabeth City | - | 100.00% | - | 0.00% | - | 100.00% | - |
| Essex | 11 | 57.89% | 8 | 42.11% | 3 | 15.78% | 19 |
| Fairfax | - | 100.00% | - | 0.00% | - | 100.00% | - |
| Fauquier | 19 | 100.00% | 0 | 0.00% | 19 | 100.00% | 19 |
| Fluvanna | No data | | No data | | No data | | |
| Franklin | - | 100.00% | - | 0.00% | - | 100.00% | - |
| Frederick | 133 | 100.00% | 0 | 0.00% | 133 | 100.00% | 133 |
| Gloucester | No data | | No data | | No data | | |
| Goochland | No data | | No data | | No data | | |
| Greenbrier | No data | | No data | | No data | | |
| Greensville | - | 100.00% | - | 0.00% | - | 100.00% | - |
| Halifax | - | 100.00% | - | 0.00% | - | 100.00% | - |
| Hampshire | No data | | No data | | No data | | |
| Hanover | - | 100.00% | - | 0.00% | - | 100.00% | - |
| Hardy | No data | | No data | | No data | | |
| Harrison | No data | | No data | | No data | | |
| Henrico | - | 100.00% | - | 0.00% | - | 100.00% | - |
| Henry | - | 100.00% | - | 0.00% | - | 100.00% | - |
| Isle of Wight | - | 100.00% | - | 0.00% | - | 100.00% | - |
| James City | - | 100.00% | - | 0.00% | - | 100.00% | - |
| King and Queen | No data | | No data | | No data | | |
| King George | No data | | No data | | No data | | |
| King William | No data | | No data | | No data | | |
| Lancaster | 14 | 100.00% | 0 | 0.00% | 14 | 100.00% | 14 |
| Loudoun | No data | | No data | | No data | | |
| Louisa | 50 | 100.00% | 0 | 0.00% | 50 | 100.00% | 50 |
| Lunenburg | - | 100.00% | - | 0.00% | - | 100.00% | - |
| Matthews | No data | | No data | | No data | | |
| Mecklenburg | No data | | No data | | No data | | |
| Middlesex | No data | | No data | | No data | | |
| Monongalia | No data | | No data | | No data | | |
| Montgomery | - | 100.00% | - | 0.00% | - | 100.00% | - |
| Nansemond | - | 100.00% | - | 0.00% | - | 100.00% | - |
| New Kent | - | 100.00% | - | 0.00% | - | 100.00% | - |
| Norfolk | - | 100.00% | - | 0.00% | - | 100.00% | - |
| Northampton | No data | | No data | | No data | | |
| Northumberland | No data | | No data | | No data | | |
| Nottoway | No data | | No data | | No data | | |
| Ohio | No data | | No data | | No data | | |
| Orange | No data | | No data | | No data | | |
| Patrick | - | 100.00% | - | 0.00% | - | 100.00% | - |
| Pendleton | 38 | 100.00% | 0 | 0.00% | 38 | 100.00% | 38 |
| Pittsylvania | - | 100.00% | - | 0.00% | - | 100.00% | - |
| Powhatan | 90 | 84.11% | 17 | 15.89% | 73 | 68.22% | 107 |
| Prince Edward | - | 100.00% | - | 0.00% | - | 100.00% | - |
| Prince George | - | 100.00% | - | 0.00% | - | 100.00% | - |
| Prince William | - | 100.00% | - | 0.00% | - | 100.00% | - |
| Princess Anne | 51 | 100.00% | 0 | 0.00% | 51 | 100.00% | 51 |
| Randolph | No data | | No data | | No data | | |
| Richmond | No data | | No data | | No data | | |
| Rockbridge | No data | | No data | | No data | | |
| Rockingham | - | 100.00% | - | 0.00% | - | 100.00% | - |
| Russell | - | 100.00% | - | 0.00% | - | 100.00% | - |
| Shenandoah | - | 100.00% | - | 0.00% | - | 100.00% | - |
| Southampton | - | 100.00% | - | 0.00% | - | 100.00% | - |
| Spotsylvania | No data | | No data | | No data | | |
| Stafford | - | 100.00% | - | 0.00% | - | 100.00% | - |
| Surry | - | 100.00% | - | 0.00% | - | 100.00% | - |
| Sussex | - | 100.00% | - | 0.00% | - | 100.00% | - |
| Warwick | - | 100.00% | - | 0.00% | - | 100.00% | - |
| Washington | - | 100.00% | - | 0.00% | - | 100.00% | - |
| Westmoreland | 15 | 100.00% | 0 | 0.00% | 15 | 100.00% | 15 |
| Wythe | - | 100.00% | - | 0.00% | - | 100.00% | - |
| York | - | 100.00% | - | 0.00% | - | 100.00% | - |
| Total | 1,097 | 95.14% | 56 | 4.86% | 1,041 | 90.28% | 1,153 |

==== Results by county swing ====
Swing compared to the 1788-89 election
| County | Party | | Status |
| County | Democratic-Republican / Anti-Federalist (Note: Swing data compares Democratic-Republican performance to previous Anti-Federalist performance. The Democratic-Republican party is considered to be the direct evolution of the Anti-Federalist coalition.) | Federalist | Status |
| County | ± pp | ± pp | Status |
|---|---|---|---|
| Accomack | No data | No data | N/A |
| Albemarle | ▲60.56 pp | ▼60.56 pp | Flip |
| Amelia | No data | No data | N/A |
| Amherst | No data | No data | N/A |
| Augusta | ▲100.00 pp | ▼100.00 pp | Flip |
| Bedford | 0.00 pp | 0.00 pp | Hold |
| Berkeley | ▲100.00 pp | ▼100.00 pp | Flip |
| Botetourt | No data | No data | N/A |
| Brunswick | ▲20.00 pp | ▼20.00 pp | Gain |
| Buckingham | ▲2.48 pp | ▼2.48 pp | Gain |
| Campbell | 0.00 pp | 0.00 pp | Hold |
| Caroline | No data | No data | N/A |
| Charles City | ▲100.00 pp | ▼100.00 pp | Flip |
| Charlotte | 0.00 pp | 0.00 pp | Hold |
| Chesterfield | No data | No data | N/A |
| Culpeper | No data | No data | N/A |
| Cumberland | ▲34.16 pp | ▼34.16 pp | Gain |
| Dinwiddie | No data | No data | N/A |
| Elizabeth City | ▲100.00 pp | ▼100.00 pp | Flip |
| Essex | ▼39.30 pp | ▲39.30 pp | Loss |
| Fairfax | ▲100.00 pp | ▼100.00 pp | Flip |
| Fauquier | ▲100.00 pp | ▼100.00 pp | Flip |
| Fluvanna | No data | No data | N/A |
| Franklin | 0.00 pp | 0.00 pp | Hold |
| Frederick | ▲100.00 pp | ▼100.00 pp | Flip |
| Gloucester | No data | No data | N/A |
| Goochland | No data | No data | N/A |
| Greenbrier | No data | No data | N/A |
| Greensville | ▲41.11 pp | ▼41.11 pp | Gain |
| Halifax | 0.00 pp | 0.00 pp | Hold |
| Hampshire | No data | No data | N/A |
| Hanover | No data | No data | N/A |
| Hardy | No data | No data | N/A |
| Harrison | No data | No data | N/A |
| Henrico | ▲100.00 pp | ▼100.00 pp | Flip |
| Henry | 0.00 pp | 0.00 pp | Hold |
| Isle of Wight | ▲74.38 pp | ▼74.38 pp | Flip |
| James City | ▲100.00 pp | ▼100.00 pp | Flip |
| King and Queen | No data | No data | N/A |
| King George | No data | No data | N/A |
| King William | No data | No data | N/A |
| Lancaster | No data | No data | N/A |
| Loudoun | No data | No data | N/A |
| Louisa | ▲100.00 pp | ▼100.00 pp | Flip |
| Lunenburg | No data | No data | N/A |
| Matthews | No data | No data | New |
| Mecklenburg | No data | No data | N/A |
| Middlesex | No data | No data | N/A |
| Monongalia | No data | No data | N/A |
| Montgomery | 0.00 pp | 0.00 pp | Hold |
| Nansemond | ▲100.00 pp | ▼100.00 pp | Flip |
| New Kent | ▲100.00 pp | ▼100.00 pp | Flip |
| Norfolk | ▲100.00 pp | ▼100.00 pp | Flip |
| Northampton | No data | No data | N/A |
| Northumberland | No data | No data | N/A |
| Nottoway | No data | No data | New |
| Ohio | No data | No data | N/A |
| Orange | No data | No data | N/A |
| Patrick | No data | No data | New |
| Pendleton | ▲100.00 pp | ▼100.00 pp | Flip |
| Pittsylvania | 0.00 pp | 0.00 pp | Hold |
| Powhatan | ▲74.59 pp | ▼74.59 pp | Flip |
| Prince Edward | 0.00 pp | 0.00 pp | Hold |
| Prince George | ▲5.23 pp | ▼5.23 pp | Gain |
| Prince William | ▲100.00 pp | ▼100.00 pp | Flip |
| Princess Anne | ▲100.00 pp | ▼100.00 pp | Flip |
| Randolph | No data | No data | N/A |
| Richmond | No data | No data | N/A |
| Rockbridge | No data | No data | N/A |
| Rockingham | No data | No data | N/A |
| Russell | ▲100.00 pp | ▼100.00 pp | Flip |
| Shenandoah | ▲100.00 pp | ▼100.00 pp | Flip |
| Southampton | ▲99.18 pp | ▼99.18 pp | Flip |
| Spotsylvania | No data | No data | N/A |
| Stafford | No data | No data | N/A |
| Surry | ▲97.79 pp | ▼97.79 pp | Flip |
| Sussex | ▲32.14 pp | ▼32.14 pp | Gain |
| Warwick | ▲100.00 pp | ▼100.00 pp | Flip |
| Washington | ▲100.00 pp | ▼100.00 pp | Flip |
| Westmoreland | ▲100.00 pp | ▼100.00 pp | Flip |
| Wythe | No data | No data | New |
| York | ▲100.00 pp | ▼100.00 pp | Flip |
| Total | ▲66.66 pp | ▼66.66 pp | Flip |

=== Results by district ===
1792 United States presidential election in Virginia
| District | E.V. | Democratic-Republican electors | | | Federalist electors | | | Margin | | Total (Note: Some district results are missing or incomplete.) |
| District | E.V. | # | % | E.V. | # | % | E.V. | # | % | Total |
|---|---|---|---|---|---|---|---|---|---|---|
| Unassigned | 2 | - | - | 2 | - | - | 0 | - | - | - |
| 1st | 1 | 190 | 79.83% | 1 | 48 | 20.17% | 0 | 142 | 59.66% | 238 |
| 2nd | 1 | - | 100.00% | 1 | - | 0.00% | 0 | - | 100.00% | - |
| 3rd | 1 | 506 | 100.00% | 1 | 0 | 0.00% | 0 | 506 | 100.00% | 506 |
| 4th | 1 | 203 | 100.00% | 1 | 0 | 0.00% | 0 | 203 | 100.00% | 203 |
| 5th | 1 | 19 | 100.00% | 1 | 0 | 0.00% | 0 | 19 | 100.00% | 19 |
| 6th | 1 | 7 | 100.00% | 1 | 0 | 0.00% | 0 | 7 | 100.00% | 7 |
| 7th | 1 | - | 100.00% | 1 | - | 0.00% | 0 | - | 100.00% | - |
| 8th | 1 | 50 | 100.00% | 1 | 0 | 0.00% | 0 | 50 | 100.00% | 50 |
| 9th | 1 | 38 | 100.00% | 1 | 0 | 0.00% | 0 | 38 | 100.00% | 38 |
| 10th | 1 | 11 | 57.89% | 1 | 8 | 42.11% | 0 | 3 | 15.78% | 19 |
| 11th | 1 | - | 100.00% | 1 | - | 0.00% | 0 | - | 100.00% | - |
| 12th | 1 | - | 100.00% | 1 | - | 0.00% | 0 | - | 100.00% | - |
| 13th | 1 | 51 | 100.00% | 1 | 0 | 0.00% | 0 | 51 | 100.00% | 51 |
| 14th | 1 | - | 100.00% | 1 | - | 0.00% | 0 | - | 100.00% | - |
| 15th | 1 | - | 100.00% | 1 | - | 0.00% | 0 | - | 100.00% | - |
| 16th | 1 | - | 100.00% | 1 | - | 0.00% | 0 | - | 100.00% | - |
| 17th | 1 | - | 100.00% | 1 | - | 0.00% | 0 | - | 100.00% | - |
| 18th | 1 | - | 100.00% | 1 | - | 0.00% | 0 | - | 100.00% | - |
| 19th | 1 | 29 | 100.00% | 1 | 0 | 0.00% | 0 | 29 | 100.00% | 29 |
| Total | 21 | 1,097 | 95.14% | 21 | 56 | 4.86% | 0 | 1,041 | 90.28% | 1,153 |

=== Results by elector ===
1792 United States presidential election in Virginia's 1st congressional district
| Party | Candidate | Votes | % |
|---|---|---|---|
| Democratic-Republican | John Pride (Note: Democratic-Republican elector for this election.) | 189 | 62.58% |
| Unknown | Alexander Jones | 64 | 21.19% |
| Federalist | William Murray (Note: Federalist partisan in politics during the 1790s.) | 48 | 15.89% |
| Democratic-Republican | Samuel Pleasants (Note: Democratic-Republican partisan in politics during the 1790s.) | 1 | 0.33% |
| Total votes | | 302 | 100.00% |

1792 United States presidential election in Virginia's 2nd congressional district
| Party | Candidate | Votes | % |
|---|---|---|---|
| Democratic-Republican | John Early (Note: Democratic-Republican elector for this election.) | — | 100.00% |
| Total votes | | — | 100.00% |

1792 United States presidential election in Virginia's 3rd congressional district
| Party | Candidate | Votes | % |
|---|---|---|---|
| Democratic-Republican | Moses Hunter (Note: Democratic-Republican elector for this election.) | 374 | 73.91% |
| Democratic-Republican | John Smith (Note: Democratic-Republican candidate for the Virginia House of Representatives in 1793.) | 132 | 26.09% |
| Total votes | | 506 | 100.00% |

1792 United States presidential election in Virginia's 4th congressional district
| Party | Candidate | Votes | % |
|---|---|---|---|
| Democratic-Republican | Thomas Claiborne (Note: Democratic-Republican elector for this election.) | 203 | 99.02% |
| Unknown | Richard Kennon | 2 | 0.98% |
| Total votes | | 205 | 100.00% |

1792 United States presidential election in Virginia's 5th congressional district
| Party | Candidate | Votes | % |
|---|---|---|---|
| Democratic-Republican | Stevens Thomson Mason (Note: Democratic-Republican elector for this election.) | 19 | 43.18% |
| Unknown | Francis Peyton | 25 | 56.82% |
| Total votes | | 44 | 100.00% |

1792 United States presidential election in Virginia's 6th congressional district
| Party | Candidate | Votes | % |
|---|---|---|---|
| Democratic-Republican | Elias Langham (Note: Democratic-Republican elector for this election.) | 7 | 58.33% |
| Unknown | William Cabell Jr. | 5 | 41.67% |
| Total votes | | 12 | 100.00% |

1792 United States presidential election in Virginia's 7th congressional district
| Party | Candidate | Votes | % |
|---|---|---|---|
| Democratic-Republican | George Carrington (Note: Democratic-Republican elector for this election.) | — | 100.00% |
| Total votes | | — | 100.00% |

1792 United States presidential election in Virginia's 8th congressional district
| Party | Candidate | Votes | % |
|---|---|---|---|
| Democratic-Republican | William Overton Callis (Note: Democratic-Republican elector for this election.) | 50 | 100.00% |
| Total votes | | 50 | 100.00% |

1792 United States presidential election in Virginia's 9th congressional district
| Party | Candidate | Votes | % |
|---|---|---|---|
| Democratic-Republican | Maxwell Armstrong (Note: Democratic-Republican elector for this election.) | 38 | 31.15% |
| Unknown | Elias Poston | 82 | 67.21% |
| Unknown | Andrew Wodrow | 2 | 1.64% |
| Total votes | | 122 | 100.00% |

1792 United States presidential election in Virginia's 10th congressional district
| Party | Candidate | Votes | % |
|---|---|---|---|
| Democratic-Republican | John Roane Jr. (Note: Democratic-Republican elector for this election.) | 9 | 47.37% |
| Federalist | Ralph Wormeley (Note: Voted in favor of the new federal constituion. Federalist candidate for the Virginia House of Representatives in 1790. Federalist partisan in politics during the 1790s. Later, a federalist elector in 1796. No documented political/oppositional shift noted during the 1790s.) | 8 | 42.11% |
| Democratic-Republican | Larkin Smith (Note: Staunch Democratic-Republican partisan in politics during the 1790s.) | 2 | 10.53% |
| Unknown | Matthew Anderson | — | — |
| Total votes | | 19 | 100.00% |

1792 United States presidential election in Virginia's 11th congressional district
| Party | Candidate | Votes | % |
|---|---|---|---|
| Democratic-Republican | James Murdaugh (Note: Democratic-Republican elector for this election.) | — | 100.00% |
| Total votes | | — | 100.00% |

1792 United States presidential election in Virginia's 12th congressional district
| Party | Candidate | Votes | % |
|---|---|---|---|
| Democratic-Republican | Nathaniel Wilkinson (Note: Democratic-Republican elector for this election.) | — | 100.00% |
| Total votes | | — | 100.00% |

1792 United States presidential election in Virginia's 13th congressional district
| Party | Candidate | Votes | % |
|---|---|---|---|
| Democratic-Republican | John Wise (Note: Democratic-Republican elector for this election.) | 51 | 35.17% |
| Unknown | Anthony Walke | 16 | 11.03% |
| Unknown | Thomas Lawson | 78 | 53.79% |
| Total votes | | 145 | 100.00% |

1792 United States presidential election in Virginia's 14th congressional district
| Party | Candidate | Votes | % |
|---|---|---|---|
| Democratic-Republican | Tarlton Woodson (Note: Democratic-Republican elector for this election.) | — | 100.00% |
| Total votes | | — | 100.00% |

1792 United States presidential election in Virginia's 15th congressional district
| Party | Candidate | Votes | % |
|---|---|---|---|
| Democratic-Republican | Claiborne Watkins (Note: Democratic-Republican elector for this election.) | — | 100.00% |
| Total votes | | — | 100.00% |

1792 United States presidential election in Virginia's 16th congressional district
| Party | Candidate | Votes | % |
|---|---|---|---|
| Democratic-Republican | Daniel C. Brent (Note: Democratic-Republican elector for this election.) | — | 100.00% |
| Total votes | | — | 100.00% |

1792 United States presidential election in Virginia's 17th congressional district
| Party | Candidate | Votes | % |
|---|---|---|---|
| Democratic-Republican | Archibald Stuart (Note: Democratic-Republican elector for this election.) | — | 100.00% |
| Total votes | | — | 100.00% |

1792 United States presidential election in Virginia's 18th congressional district
| Party | Candidate | Votes | % |
|---|---|---|---|
| Democratic-Republican | Michael Bailey (Note: Democratic-Republican elector for this election.) | — | 100.00% |
| Total votes | | — | 100.00% |

1792 United States presidential election in Virginia's 19th congressional district
| Party | Candidate | Votes | % |
|---|---|---|---|
| Democratic-Republican | Catesby Jones (Note: Democratic-Republican elector for this election.) | 29 | 76.32% |
| Unknown | Daniel McCarty | 4 | 10.53% |
| Unknown | James Ball | 3 | 7.89% |
| Unknown | James Gordon | 1 | 2.63% |
| Unknown | Samuel Rust | 1 | 2.63% |
| Total votes | | 38 | 100.00% |

1792 United States presidential election in Virginia: Unassigned electors
| Party | Candidate | Votes | % |
|---|---|---|---|
| Democratic-Republican | John Bowyer (Note: Democratic-Republican elector for this election.) | — | — |
| Democratic-Republican | John Dawson (Note: Democratic-Republican elector for this election.) | — | — |
| Total votes | | — | — |

== See also ==
- United States presidential elections in Virginia
