= Burdett Ashton =

American planter, military officer and politician (1720–1762)

Member of the Virginia House of Delegates
- In office 1799–1800

Personal details
- Born: November 21, 1747 Chestnut Hill, Colony of Virginia, English America
- Died: March 8, 1814 (aged 66) Washington Parish, Westmoreland County, Virginia, United States
- Spouse(s): Anne "Nancy" Washington (m. 1768; died 1777) Sarah Blair (m. 1778; died 1780) Mary Keene (m. 1783; died 1814)
- Parent(s): Charles Ashton III; Sarah Butler
- Occupation: Planter, politician

Burdet Ashton (November 21, 1747 – March 8, 1814) of Chestnut Hill, was a planter and politician in Westmoreland County, Virginia (today King George County).

== Early life ==
Ashton was born on November 21, 1747, at Chestnut Hill, in Westmoreland County, Virginia (today King George County). He was a son of Charles Ashton III (1712–1781) and Sarah Butler (1715–1772). Among his siblings was younger brother, Lawrence Ashton, who married Hannah Gibbons Dade (a daughter of Horatio Dade).

His paternal grandparents were Charles Ashton and Ann (née Burdett) Ashton.

== Career ==
Ashton was a member of the Virginia Ratifying Convention in 1788 and a member of the Virginia House of Delegates from 1799 to 1800.

== Personal life ==
Ashton was married three times. On December 19, 1768, Ashton was married to Anne "Nancy" Washington (1752–1777), a daughter of Augustine Washington Jr. and Anne (née Aylett) Washington. Nancy's father was the elder half-brother of George Washington. Before her death on June 3, 1777, they were the parents of four children, only one of whom lived to marry:

- Sarah Washington Ashton (1769–1820), who married Nicholas Battalle Fitzhugh in 1788; he later served as Judge of the United States Circuit Court of the District of Columbia from 1803 to 1814.
- Charles Augustine Ashton (1770–1800), who died unmarried.
- Burdett Ashton (1773–1812), who died unmarried.
- Ann Ashton (b. 1773), who died unmarried.

After Nancy's death in 1777, he married Sarah Blair (1758–1780), a daughter of Capt. James Blair of Northumberland County, on December 3, 1778. Before her death on November 11, 1780, they were the parents of:

- Sarah Keene Ashton (b. 1779), who married Col. Charles Stuart, a son of John Stuart and Frances (née Alexander) Stuart and brother to U.S. Representative Philip Stuart.
- Margaret Blair Ashton (1780–1781), who died in infancy.

After Sarah's death in 1780, he married Mary Keene (1762–c. 1835), daughter of Capt. Newton Keene on February 18, 1783. Together, they were the parents of three children:

- John Newton Ashton (b. 1784), who married Louisa Ann Ashton, a daughter of Charles Ashton in c. 1810. After her death in 1825, he married Ann Maria Ashton, a daughter of Maj. John Ashton.
- Hannah Butler Ashton (1785–1860), who married Capt. George Hunter Terrett of Fairfax County.
- Mary Ashton (b. 1787), who married Jacob Wray Stuart of King George County in 1808.

Ashton died on March 8, 1814.
