= John Hartwell Cocke Sr. =

American politician (1749–1791)

John Hartwell Cocke

Member of the Virginia House of Delegates from Surry County
- In office May 5, 1777 – May 3, 1778 Serving with William Browne
- Preceded by: Allen Cocke
- Succeeded by: Benjamin Putney

Personal details
- Born: November 25, 1749 Surry County, Virginia Colony, British America
- Died: February 9, 1791 (aged 1) Surry County, Virginia, U.S.
- Party: Federalist
- Spouse: Elizabeth Kennon
- Children: 2 sons (including John Hartwell Cocke) and 6 daughters

Military service
- Branch/service: Virginia State Militia
- Years of service: 1775–1787
- Rank: Colonel
- Battles/wars: American Revolutionary War; *Siege of Yorktown

John Hartwell Cocke (November 25, 1749 – February 9, 1791) was a Virginia planter, lawyer and politician from Surry County who served one term in the Virginia House of Delegates as well as in the Virginia Ratifying Convention, both after fighting as a Virginia militiaman in the Revolutionary War. Cocke also held multiple county offices, including as justice of the peace, and as County Lieutenant from 1787 until his (early) death.

== Early life and education ==
John was born to the former Anne Ruffin and her burgess husband Hartwell Cocke in Surry County in the Colony of Virginia. Both parents could trace their descent from the First Families of Virginia, and had traditions of public service, as well as operated plantations using enslaved labor. Cocke received a private education appropriate to his class and attended the College of William & Mary across the James River. He was an early member of Phi Beta Kappa and a friend of William Short, also the son of a prominent Surry County family, and who later became an American ambassador, as well as wealthy, but freed his slaves and criticized slavery. Meanwhile, as the oldest of nine children, Cocke inherited the largest share of his father's estate and managed the interests of his minor siblings.

== Career ==
=== Lawyer ===
Through the 1770s and 1780s, Cocke frequently served as executor of the wills of neighbors, as well as guardian of orphaned children.

=== Military officer ===
Virginia expanded her militia as the conflict with Great Britain loomed. Cocke was commissioned as captain on June 27, 1775, and promoted to major on June 26, 1781, during the Siege of Yorktown. After the war Cocke continued his service in the Virginia militia, becoming the county lieutenant, or commander of its militia on March 31, 1787.

=== Politician ===
His public career began when he was elected to the Surry County Committee of Safety in 1775 (and re-elected in 1776). During the American Revolutionary War, in addition to his military service described below, Cocke supplied provisions to the local militia. Surry County voters elected him as one of the county's representatives to the Virginia House of Delegates, succeeding the deceased Alan Cocke, but did not re-elect this man, perhaps because he was taken into custody of the sergeant at arms and fined for nonattendance (although in January he was appointed to a 10-member committee to apportion the public levy). Cocke's main service was as a justice of the peace, the justices collectively in that era governing the county. He was sworn in on February 24, 1778 and attended regularly until just before his death. In 1788, Cocke and John Allen of Claremont were elected as Surry County's representatives to the [[Virginia Ratifying Convention. He did not speak in any of the debates, but voted against amendments proposed by the Antifederalists, and for ratification of the U.S. Constitution (which passed) and in the conference's last days supported an unsuccessful resolution limiting Congress' tax power.

=== Planter ===
Like his father, brothers and others of his class, Cocke farmed using enslaved labor. At the time of his death, he owned approximately 130 slaves at three major plantations: in Surry County and further south and west upriver in Buckingham and Fluvanna Counties. Cocke also owned land in Brunswick County, Virginia|Brunswick County]] and 1,100 acres in Bourbon County (that became Kentucky, which may have rewarded his military service). Four years earlier, in the 1787 Virginia tax census, Cocke owned 17 enslaved teenagers and 27 enslaved adults, 14 horses and a stud stallion as well as 61 cattle in Fluvanna county, 11 enslaved teenagers and 16 enslaved adults, 5 horses and 30 cattle in Buckingham county, and 22 enslaved teenagers and 21 enslaved adults, 8 horses, 42 cattle and 4 wheeled chariot in Surry county.

== Personal life ==
Cocke married Elizabeth Kennon of Chesterfield County on November 28, 1773. She would bear six daughters and two sons, although only one son (John Hartwell Cocke, who became known as an agricultural reformer and temperance advocate) and four daughters reached adulthood.

== Death and legacy ==
Cocke died on February 9, 1791, and was buried in the family cemetery at Mount Pleasant.
