= Edmund Booker =

American planter, patriot and politician

Member of the Virginia Ratifying Convention for Amelia County
- In office 1788 Serving with John Pride

Member of the House of Burgesses from Amelia County
- In office 1758–1761 Serving with Richard Booker, John Winn
- Preceded by: Thomas Tabb
- Succeeded by: David Greenhill

Personal details
- Born: Edmund Booker; October 17, 1719 Essex County, Colony of Virginia
- Died: December 1792 or January 1793 Amelia County, Virginia
- Spouse(s): 3 including Edith Marot Cobbs, Prudence (surname unknown) and Mary Pride

Military service
- Allegiance: United States
- Branch/service: Virginia Militia
- Rank: Captain

Edmund Booker (October 17, 1719 – January, 1793) was an American planter and politician in Amelia County, Virginia that he represented in the Virginia Ratifying Convention in 1788, as well as held local offices.

== Early life and education ==
He was born to Jane Booker (circa 1697-after 1758) and her husband Edmund Booker (1693–1758) probably in Tidewater Virginia's Essex County. His grandfather Richard Booker (1642-before 1711) had emigrated from Amsterdam, Holland, where his English religious dissenter parents had fled, and immigrated to the Colony of Virginia where he settled in Abingdon Parish of Gloucester County. Grandfather Richard had married at least twice, but only one son Frances Booker (1695–1752) survived of his last marriage, to Hannah Hand (1670–1720) of Elizabeth City County (also in the Tidewater region). This man's father was the youngest of five sons (and two daughters) born in Richard's marriage to Rebecca Leake of Tidewater York County. Most of the siblings, including this man's father, moved their young families westward to Amelia County, then being settled in Virginia's Piedmont region. This man's uncle Edward Booker (1680–1750), was living in Henrico County when he received a land grant of 2050 acres south of the James River in what was then Prince George County around 1732, two years before the legislature split off Amelia County. Edward and his brother (this man's uncle) Richard Booker (d. 1760) were two of the earliest justices of the peace in Amelia County (the justices in that era collectively governing the county, as well as handled smaller judicial matters) and Edward, Richard, and Edward Booker Jr. would ultimately represent Amelia County in the House of Burgesses, as well as held other local offices. The other uncles were Richard Booker (1688-1743, named after a brother of the same name died as an infant, and who one genealogist believed remained near Williamsburg in York County) and John Booker (1690-?). Both this man's father and Edward Booker Sr. named one of their sons Edward, and other common names in the family were Richard, John, William and Frances, which complicated genealogies. In any event, this son received a private education appropriate to his class.

== Career ==
Booker won his first election in 1749, to the vestry of Raleigh Parish. In 1758, he and Richard Booker won election to the House of Burgesses, although Richard Booker died and was replaced by John Winn in the 1761 session. During his term, Edmund Booker took the oath of office as justice of the peace for Amelia County on June 26, 1760. He either did not stand for re-election, or was defeated, as was Winn, for voters replaced both seats in 1761. In 1761, during the French and Indian War, this man was a captain in the local militia, and by October 1772 became sheriff of Amelia County.

In that era, sheriffs were ineligible to serve in the state legislature (hence his probable successor David Greenhill gave up his seat before 1765, when he became sheriff and was replaced by Robert Munford who continued to win re-election until 1768). Although merchant John Tabb and John Winn represented Amelia County during Virginia's revolutionary conventions and first session of the Virginia House of Delegates, the seats appear to have become competitive, with Revolutionary era county clerk John Pride serving for several sessions alongside different men before John Booker Jr. was elected in 1784 and this man's son Davis Booker won one of the two seats in 1787 and again in 1788. His cousin William Booker (son of William Booker) lived in the area which became Prince Edward County, Virginia, which he represented in the last Revolutionary convention (1776) and in the House of Delegates.

Between Davis Booker's elections to the House of Delegates, this man and John Pride won election to the Virginia Ratifying Convention as Amelia County's representatives. Both men apparently sided with their neighbor (and former Virginia governor) Patrick Henry, a leading Anti-Federalist, but made no speeches that were recorded. Both voted to require amendments to the proposed new federal constitution, and then voted (unsuccessfully) against ratification.

In the Virginia tax census of 1787, Edmund Booker owned 18 teenage slaves and 13 adults, as well as 14 horses and 34 cattle. Edmund Booker Jr. lived in the county's other district, near Samuel Booker, and paid taxes on four teenaged slaves, four enslaved adults, five horses and nine cattle. He died still owning eleven slaves and 568 acres of land.

== Personal life ==
Booker married three times. On May 17, 1746 he married Edith Marot Cobbs (1725-after 1765), who had been born in Williamsburg but moved to Amelia County when her father Samuel Cobbs became the new county's first clerk of court. Before her death, she bore four sons and three daughters. Edmund's will named his surviving daughters as Jane, Rachel Morton and Francis Hill, and sons Edmund Jr., Samuel, Davis and Parham, as well as grandson Edmund M. Booker. After her death, the widower remarried to a woman named Prudence, but they had no children before her death. On June 28, 1781, he married Mary Pride, who also bore no children and died before her husband.

== Death and legacy ==
Booker wrote his will September 1792, and it was admitted to probate in Amelia County on January 24, 1793. Booker's last public act was in December 1792 when he signed as security for his namesake son (who followed his father's political footsteps by becoming sheriff of Amelia County). Executors included his sons Edmund Jr. and Davis and (probable nephew) Richard Booker.
