= George Parker (judge) =

American politician (1761–1826)

Member of the Virginia House of Delegates from the Northampton County district
- In office December 4, 1809 – December 1, 1810 Serving with William Dunton
- Preceded by: Littleton Upshur Jr.
- Succeeded by: Leonard Baker

Personal details
- Born: 1761 Northampton County, Colony of Virginia
- Died: 1826 (aged 64–65) Baltimore, Maryland
- Resting place: Old St. Paul's cemetery, Baltimore, Maryland
- Spouse(s): Margaret Eyre (1765–1799); Elizabeth Smith Stith; Susanna Smith Savage (1770–1848)
- Children: Severn Eyre Parker, 2 daughters
- Occupation: Lawyer, judge, military officer, planter, politician

George Littleton Parker (1761 – 1826) was a Virginia military officer, lawyer, planter, politician and judge from the Eastern Shore of Virginia. He represented Northampton County in the Virginia House of Delegates for two terms (1809–1811), before becoming a Virginia judge for the district encompassing the eastern shore. Decades earlier, he fought for the American patriot cause in the American Revolutionary War and represented nearby Accomac County in the Virginia Ratifying Convention of 1788, in which he voted for ratification of the United States Constitution.

== Early life ==
Parker was born in 1761 to the former Ada Bagwell and her planter husband, George Littleton Parker V. His eldest brother, lieutenant Thomas Parker (1757–1819) enlisted in the Continental Army as ensign of the 2nd regiment and rose to the rank of lieutenant, and was captured either in that capacity or at the Battle of Germantown and was released in a prisoner exchange in 1780. The family also included sisters Ann Parker Reed and Elizabeth Parker Upshur. He was the fifth generation of his family to share the name (an elder brother of the same name dying as an infant), but the only one of that name who served in the state legislature. His ancestor, George Parker (died 1674) and two brothers had emigrated from Southampton and Devonshire in England to the Virginia colony around 1650, during the English Civil Wars as well as Virginia's tobacco boom, and moved from Isle of Wight County to Virginia's Eastern Shore, then known as Accomac shire and later Accomack County. They may have originally settled in the lower Hampton Roads area because a relative, William Parker, patented two 250 acre tracts of land near the Nansemond River and its Powell's Creek tributary in 1636 and 1638 what was then Warresqueak County (but became Upper Norfolk County) and served in the House of Burgesses in 1642. In England, this family was related to the Earls of Macclesfield. His Virginia emigrant ancestor, George Parker Jr. became sheriff of Accomack County and held various local offices, as well as established a plantation called Poplar Grove which later generations of men sharing the same name would inherit, but would ultimately be sold by this man's sole son. His maternal grandparents were burgess Severn Eyre and his wife, the former Margaret Taylor.

== Career ==
Parker inherited the family plantation from his father, and like him operated it using enslaved labor, as would his son. In the last federal census of his life, Parker owned 23 slaves in Northampton County, and his son ten.

Admitted to the Virginia bar, he began his public career as one of the representatives of Accomac County in the Virginia Ratifying Convention of 1788, where he voted the opposite on all three major issues from his fellow Accomac representative, Edmund Custis. He then won election twice to the Virginia House of Delegates representing Northampton County.

== Personal life ==
Parker married three times. On October 12, 1786, he married Margaret Andrews Eyre, (1765–1799), who gave birth to a son, Severn E. Parker, who followed his father's career as a planter and politician, even serving one term as a Congressman. She also gave birth to two daughters (Sally and Ann) and another son, also George Parker, but who died as a boy. Following her death, Parker married twice more, to widowed sisters (daughters of Isaac Smith (1734–1813), who had been a member of the Accomack Committee of Public Safety during the Revolutionary War), but neither marriage resulted in children. On May 5, 1802, Parker married Elizabeth Smith Stith, widow of Griffin Stith Jr., and following her death, in May 1813 married her sister, Susanna Smith Savage (1770–1848), the widow of long-time Accomack County clerk Littleton Savage, who also survived this husband (by two decades) and is like him buried in Baltimore (where her brother Isaac Smith Jr. was a merchant and two other sisters lived).

== Death and legacy ==
Parker died in Baltimore, Maryland, where two of his sisters in law lived, as did his brother-in-law Isaac Smith Jr. was a prominent merchant (and widower since 1806 of the former Maria Hopkinson of Philadelphia, the daughter of Francis Hopkinson).
