= Saul Matthews =

African American slave and spy

Saul Matthews was an enslaved African American who spied for the Continental Army during American Revolutionary War. He spied on the British, obtaining valuable information for the Patriots. As a result, Matthews was given his full freedom from slavery by the Virginia legislature in 1792: "In consideration of many very essential services rendered to this Commonwealth during the late war … full liberty and freedom … as if he was born free."

== Slavery ==
Born in Virginia, Saul Mathews was enslaved by Thomas Mathews.

== American Revolutionary War ==
In 1781, General Cornwallis and his troops captured Portsmouth, Virginia. Saul Matthews was under the command of Colonel Josiah Parker, who ordered Matthews to go into British camps and spy on them several times. Matthews always returned with much success and information, even though he was forced back into slavery for about ten years. In 1792 he successfully petitioned the Virginia General Assembly for freedom again.

== See also ==
- Intelligence in the American Revolutionary War
- Intelligence operations in the American Revolutionary War
