= Robert Andrews (clergyman) =

American politician

Member of the Virginia House of Delegates from Williamsburg
- In office October 18, 1790 – December 2, 1799
- Preceded by: Edmund Randolph
- Succeeded by: Benjamin C. Waller

Personal details
- Born: 1748 Elkton, Maryland Colony
- Died: February 4, 1804 (aged 55–56) Williamsburg, Virginia
- Spouse(s): Elizabeth Ballard; Mary Blair
- Parent(s): Moses Andrews and Letitia Cooke
- Occupation: professor, politician, author

Robert Andrews (c. 1748 – February 4, 1804) was an American clergyman who was a military chaplain in the American Revolutionary War, then professor at the College of William and Mary as well as author and politician who represented James City County in the Virginia Ratification Convention, then represented Williamsburg in the Virginia House of Delegates (1790–1799).

== Early and family life ==
Born in the near Elkton, Maryland and that colony's border with Pennsylvania, to the former Letitia Cooke and her husband Moses Andrews. His exact birth year is disputed, and may be 1743 or 1748. His great-grandfather John Andrews emigrated to province of Maryland from Rutland, England in 1654. He had four brothers, the eldest of whom one also became a clergyman and scholar in Pennsylvania: Rev. John Andrews, James Andrews, Moses Andrews and Polydore Andrews.

=== Education and ordination ===
Robert Andrews imitated his elder brother and traveled to Philadelphia to study at the College of Philadelphia (now the University of Pennsylvania) under provost William Smith and professor Francis Allison. He graduated with an A.B. degree either in 1766 or 1768, then remained to study theology. In 1769 Andrews returned to Virginia after accepting a position at Rosewell plantation to tutor the children of wealthy planter and future Virginia governor John Page in Gloucester County. In 1772 Andrews sailed to London, where he was ordained a priest.

== Career ==
Coat of Arms of Robert Andrews

=== Professor and revolutionary patriot ===
In late 1774, Andrews became one of the thirteen men (only a few clergymen), to sign a document drafted by eighty-nine former members of the House of Burgesses, which recommended a general congress as well as a non-importation association. The following year he joined the York County Committee of Safety in part to enforce that agreement.

As conflict with England worsened, the College of William and Mary in Williamsburg was thrown into turmoil. Professor of Moral Philosophy Samuel Henley fled to England. College President John Camm and two other professors were forced to resign. Only Rev. James Madison, who taught Natural Philosophy and mathematics (and was cousin of the future U.S. President of the same name) and James Bracken (master of the grammar school) remained by 1777.

In 1777, Rev. Andrews enlisted as a chaplain to the 2nd regiment of the Virginia militia under Col. George Gibson, and served until 1780.

In December 1777 Andrews accepted an appointment as Professor of Moral Philosophy at the College of William & Mary, but the college was often closed during the conflict. In October 1778, Andrews chaired the meeting to elect the Grand Master of the Grand Lodge of Virginia and became the deputy to John Blair Jr., who was a prominent local lawyer and who would become an Associate Justice of the U.S. Supreme Court in his final years. When the college was reorganized in 1779 under the guidance of Thomas Jefferson and George Wythe (who became the country's first law professor), the grammar school was closed, the professorship of oriental languages was abolished and Rev. Madison resumed teaching Moral Philosophy. However, Andrews retained his position, with the Law of Nature and Nations and the Fine Arts added to his teaching portfolio. Andrews became the first college professor in the new nation to have fine arts included in his professorship. Andrews published an almanac in at least 1781, 1783, 1794 and 1795. In 1784 he accepted the important mathematical professorship (the college certifying all surveyors in the new Commonwealth), and retained his position as professor until his death.

Williamsburg voters elected Andrews to their Committee of Safety in 1779, and soon afterward, he became one of the town's alderman. The college closed in late 1780 due to troop movements and the Battle of Green Spring before the Siege of Yorktown.

=== Politician ===
In 1781, Andrews became the personal secretary for governor Thomas Nelson.

His next elective office was as one of the delegates for James City County to the Virginia Ratifying Convention of 1788, which approved the United States Constitution. He served alongside Nathaniel Burwell and voted for ratification, but did not speak during the debates. He would later ally himself with the Federalist Party.

Beginning in 1790, Williamsburg voters elected and re-elected Andrews as their (part-time) representative in the Virginia House of Delegates (1790–1798), although the new state's capital had moved to Richmond. He succeeded Edmund Randolph and was re-elected annually until 1799, when Benjamin C. Waller defeated him. In 1798, Andrews voted against the Virginia Resolution opposing the federal Alien and Sedition Acts. Reverend James Madison and Andrews both served on the federal commission that established the final border between Virginia and Pennsylvania.

== Personal life ==
He married, first, Elizabeth Ballard (1745–1793), whose father had been clerk of Princess Anne County, Virginia. Although neither of their sons married, nor did daughter Elizabeth, their firstborn daughter Anne married William Randolph of Wilton and their third daughter Catherine married Joseph Biddle Wilkinson (son of General Wilkinson, and who moved to Louisiana). After her death, Andrews remarried, to Mary Blair (1758–1820), daughter of Justice John Blair, but they had no children. In the 1787 Virginia tax census, Andrews paid taxes on seven enslaved people, as well as two horses and a four-wheeled post chaise.

== Death and legacy ==
Andrews died in Williamsburg on February 4, 1804. He was probably buried near Williamsburg's historic Bruton Parish Church. A gravestone was never erected. The Swem Library of the College of William and Mary holds his papers, including a receipt for the sale of one slave.
