= Thomas Carter (Virginia politician) =

American politician (1731–1803)

Member of the Virginia House of Delegates for Russell County
- In office October 15, 1787 – September 30, 1792 Serving with Andrew Cowen, David Ward, Simon Cockrell
- Preceded by: position created
- Succeeded by: Richard Price

Personal details
- Born: April 24, 1731 Lancaster County, Colony of Virginia
- Died: October 5, 1803 (aged 72) Rye Cove, Russell County, Virginia
- Spouse(s): Mary Carter (d. 1781); Elizabeth Moss
- Children: 3 sons, 3 daughters
- Occupation: planter, government official and politician

Thomas Carter (April 24, 1731 – October 5, 1803) was a planter, military officer and politician in southwestern Virginia.

== Early and family life ==
Born in northeastern Virginia (either in Lancaster or Fauquier County), to the former Judith Norris and her planter husband, Peter Carter. He was likely named to honor his grandfather, Thomas Carter of Barford plantation, who had married the daughter of burgess Edward Dale. When Thomas was two years old, his father inherited half of a 304-acre plantation in King George County, Virginia. Thomas received a limited private education appropriate to his class.

== Career ==
In 1773, Carter joined his younger brothers Norris and Joseph and first cousins, Dale and John Carter (sons of Charles Carter of Amherst), and moved westward to Rye Cove on the Clinch River, in what was then Fincastle County (1772–1776), and later became Washington County (1776–1786), then Russell County (until 1814), and finally Scott County. Assisted by the Loyal Land Company, they had surveys completed in 1774, as Thomas purchased 197 acres on Cove Creek, and in 1783 bought an additional 1420 acres in Rye Cove. He farmed using enslaved labor. Although the 1787 census indicated Carter was a nonresident with a single slave, as well as 11 horses and 41 cattle, by the time of his death, Carter owned more than a dozen slaves.

Thomas Carter also became involved in the local government, first as the road overseer for what was then Washington County, Virginia (serving from 1774 until 1784). He also became involved in local defense, serving in the field in 1774 for 24 days and later for 42 days, as native Americans repeatedly attacked the new colonists, including killing and scalping his cousin Dale Carter in 1774. When the Virginia legislature split the county in late 1785, Carter's acreage was in the new Russell County, named for General William Russell, who had introduced the bill to form the county and was the son-in-law of Patrick Henry. Carter became a justice of the first Russell County Court (held on May 9, 1786) as well as lieutenant of the county militia. His farm in Rye Cove, initially the furthest west in the Clinch Valley, became a militia garrison sometimes known as "Carter's fort" as late as 1792. Also his cousin John Carter, despite settling four miles from Fort Blackmore, lost his wife and six children to raiding native Americans in 1787. Less than a year later, on April 20, 1788, native Americans captured Thomas Carter's youngest son, Morgan, his cousin Elijah Carter and a Black slave, who were returned in 1793 with the assistance of Governor Simcoe of South Carolina. Carter resigned as the Russell county lieutenant (the highest county executive office, leading and responsible for supplying the county militia) in 1794, citing increasing infirmity. However, fellow justices of the county court kept proposing him for the office of sheriff many times, before a Thomas Carter (likely his nephew) finally accepted the commission in 1803, the year of this man's death. Meanwhile, this Thomas Carter regularly wrote Virginia's governors concerning attacks on the frontier, and recommended deployments and responses.

Carter also served in Richmond (part-time) as one of the first two representatives for Russell County in the Virginia House of Delegates, and continued to win re-election several times. His first co-delegate was Andrew Cowan, the lieutenant-colonel of the county militia, and the next was David Ward, the county's first sheriff (two of his deputies being Charles and John Carter). Voters also elected Carter as one of Russell County's representatives at the Virginia Ratification Convention of 1788 (this time with Henry Dickenson, who donated land for the new county courthouse), Carter traveled to Richmond despite his son's abduction. While Carter did not speak during debates, the vote count indicates he was in the minority that opposed ratification, although two days later he was in the majority that proposed an amendment limiting the new government's taxation power.

== Personal life ==
Carter married a woman named Mary (possibly with the surname Morgan) before 1770 and before moving to southwestern Virginia. Before she died in 1781 (in childbirth of twin daughters), they had three sons and three daughters. Carter remarried, to Elizabeth Moss (possibly the widow of Matthew Moss who died in 1782), but had no additional children.

== Death and legacy ==
Although his burial location was unrecorded (and likely was on his farm at Rye Cove), his will was accepted into probate in Russell County on October 25, 1803. His son Charles Carter served many years as clerk of Lee County, Virginia.
