= Edmund Custis =

American politician (d. after 1797)

Member of the Virginia House of Delegates from the Accomac County district
- In office October 15, 1787 – October 17, 1790 Serving with John Cropper Jr., Jabez Pitt, Thomas Custis
- Preceded by: John Parramore
- Succeeded by: John Cropper Jr.

Personal details
- Born: circa 1740 Northampton County, Colony of Virginia
- Died: Baltimore, Maryland
- Spouse: Katherine Drummond
- Occupation: Planter, merchant, politician

Edmund Custis (d. after 1797) was a Virginia planter, merchant and politician from the Eastern Shore of Virginia. A member of the Custis family, one of the First Families of Virginia, he is the only one named Edmund to sit in the Virginia General Assembly.

== Early life and education ==
He was born slightly before or after 1740 in Northampton County to the former Katherine Sparrow (b. 1713), and her husband (also) Edmund Custis. The name "Edmund" was common in his father's family, and London merchant Edmund Custis was one of several merchants trading with the Eastern Shore in the second half of the 17th century. That paternal grandfather bequeathed his sloop Tabitha (possibly named after his Maryland-born wife, Tabitha Scarborough Whittington, who bore sons named Thomas and Edmund) to his friend Rev. Francis Makemie, who was also to administer his estate and consult with grandmother "Madame Tabitha Hill". A century earlier, the father of John Custis I was Edmund Custis a/k/a Cliffe, and most of the prominent men of the Custis family on the Eastern Shore were named "John". In the late 17th century, the Custis merchant family had three informal branches—in England and Ireland, in the Netherlands and Belgium, and in the American colonies. In 1676 an Edmund Custis and his brother Robert sent their brother John Custis II receipts for amounts the estate of their mother Joanne Custis of Rotterdam owed them, and that John Custis bequeathed Accomack property near Deep Creek Mill once owned by his wife Tabitha's second husband Deveroux Browne to his nephew Edmund, who left that 1000 acres to his son Thomas in 1701, who in turn bequeated it to his son Edmund (this man's grandfather) in 1721. Tabitha Scarborough Smart Browne Custis Hill (1639–1717), the grandmother and namesake of Tabitha Scarborough Whittington, was the thrice-widowed daughter of controversial Captain and Speaker Edmund Scarborough, while her brother Edmund Scarborough III inherited the family's main plantation, her brother Charles continued the family's political and military traditions by representing the Eastern Shore in both houses of the Virginia General Assembly, and their sister Matilda was an ancestor of this man's through the maternal side, as described below. After the immigrant Edmund Custis' death (and that of her fourth husband in 1700), Madame Tabitha Hill returned to the Eastern Shore and spent the last 17 years of her life directing the upbringing of her great-grandchildren, during which time portraits of her and family members were made by Sir Peter Lely.

This man's great-great-grandfather was Thomas Custis of Baltimore, Ireland, whose son Edmund became a ward of John Custis II, as well as a lawyer and justice of the peace (1691), as well as married Tabitha Scarborough Whittington of Maryland, the namesake granddaughter of Custis's third wife and widow. Their son Thomas Custis of Deep Creek plantation (d.1717, this man's great-grandfather) married Elizabeth Custis, daughter of John Custis III of Hungars plantation (and after her death Ann Kendall) while his sister (another) Tabitha married John III's brother Henry Custis (who later married Thomas Custis' widow, the former Ann Kendall before himself dying in 1733). Further complicating matters, early in this man's life, merchant Samuel Custis of Dublin, Ireland, a grandson of that Thomas Custis of Baltimore, Ireland, wrote John Custis IV (of Williamsburg concerning "lost" relatives in Virginia, but no reply (if made) survives. Furthermore, John Custis II's brother Robert also named a son Edmund, and that Belgian Edmund Custis was Roman Catholic.

This man's maternal grandmother was Anne West (the daughter of major Accomack landowner and officeholder John West (1638–1703) and his Quaker wife Matilda Scarborough, the other daughter of the controversial and powerful Capt. Edmund Scarborough. Anne West married thrice: first to his maternal grandfather in Virginia, then to Thomas Sparrow of Anne Arundel County, Maryland (who also had 3 sons by 2 earlier wives and owned property in North Carolina), then to William Sellman (who continued to reside in Anne Arundel County). Anne West's sister Sarah married Accomack County landowner and veteran burgess Tully Robinson, and their younger sister Mary married Accomack county clerk Capt. Robert Snead, and after his death William Burton (a local justice of the peace). Three of their brothers (Anthony, Alexander and John West Jr.) also owned Accomack land, but the youngest, Scarburgh West moved to North Carolina's Pamlico region. Other sisters married Accomac gentry: Matilda II married John Wise and Frances married Richard Kellem.

Thus, while this Edmund Custis had strong mercantile and somewhat incestuous family roots on the Eastern Shore as well as in Maryland, he only had one sibling, Anne, who married the widower mariner George Holt (who was pronounced dead at sea in 1758), and later married James Peterkin. Pursuant to his father's will written in early 1747 and admitted to probate in 1748, Edmund inherited a plantation (Deep Creek) from his father upon reaching legal age. Meanwhile, his mother remarried, to John Wilkins.

== Career ==
=== Planter ===
Upon reaching legal age, Custis sold his Northampton County plantation around 1760, and used to proceeds to acquire a plantation in Accomac County, which was formally separated from Northampton County in 1763. In 1770 Custis purchased 647 acres from Isaac Smith and his wife Elizabeth, and the following year purchased all the Onancock town lots held by Isaac and Elizabeth Smith. In 1788 Custis also bought lots next to the Francis Makemie Presbyterian Church, which by 1824 were owned by the Outten family. In 1791 Edmund and his wife Elizabeth Drummond sold 435 acres formerly called "Hog Neck" (that she had inherited from her father William Drummond after he and two brothers drowned in 1766), to John Teakle.

In the 1787 Virginia tax census for Accomac County, Custis owned 15 enslaved adults, 12 teenagers, 12 horses, 22 cattle and a four-wheeled chariot and stud horse.His neighbors Thomas Custis and Thomas Custis Sr. together paid taxes on 12 enslaved adults, 7 enslaved children, six horses, 10 cattle and two carriages.

=== American Revolutionary War ===
Custis does not appear either on the list of patriot militia during the American Revolutionary War (though his probable relative and later political colleague Thomas Custis did serve) nor on later lists of Loyalists. However, his modern biographer believes he probably sympathized with the cause. Custis became a vestryman of the local parish in April 1785, before which time he sold communion wine to the parish, and after which he helped repair the church. Complicating factors were distant relatives. Although the politically powerful John Custis IV had died and John Parke Custis had not reached the legal age to inherit, "Seashore" John Custis was one of the Eastern Shore leaders of demonstrations against the draft, but who later served as well as submitted claims for provisions supplied to the patriot army, and seems to have served on the vestry with Thomas Custis after Edmund Custis' departure. Furthermore, Rev. John Lyons served as rector of St. George's Parish in Accomack between 1774 and 1785. The Lancashire-born clergyman had graduated from Oxford University and became a missionary for the Society for the Propagation of the Gospel in Lewes, Delaware before moving to Accomack parish, and marrying the former Sarah Custis Smith. In 1781, as the overt hostilities were ending with patriot forces led by General George Washington (with John Parke Custis as an aide) besieging British forces near Yorktown, Rev. Lyons was convicted by a court-martial led by Accomack county lieutenant (Lt.Col. and later General) John Cropper Jr. of aiding the enemy. Judge Cropper and Edmund Custis were among those who petitioned Virginia's governor for clemency. The following year, Virginia's Council of State investigated Custis for his wartime dealings with British merchants, but the investigation was dropped after prominent local politicians came to Custis' defense.

=== Politician ===
Accomac voters first elected Custis to represent them in the Virginia House of Delegates in 1787, and he won re-election twice (serving alongside a different man each term; 1787–1790) before coming in third in 1790. In 1788, Accomac County voters also elected him and George Parker as their representatives in the Virginia Ratifying Convention, in which Custis voted against of the United States Constitution, and Parker for ratification.

== Death and legacy ==
After financial problems caused Custis to sell land and enslaved people in October, 1797, he disappears from Accomack records. One historian speculates he may have moved to Baltimore, Maryland. His childhood home, Deep Creek plantation, had become the home of John Wise and later of his son Henry A. Wise would become Virginia's governor, then a Confederate general and finally a leading Republican politician. Restored in 1965, the historic house remains today, although now with only 60 acres of land.
