= Thomas Mathews (politician) =

American Revolutionary War general and Virginia politician (1742-1812)

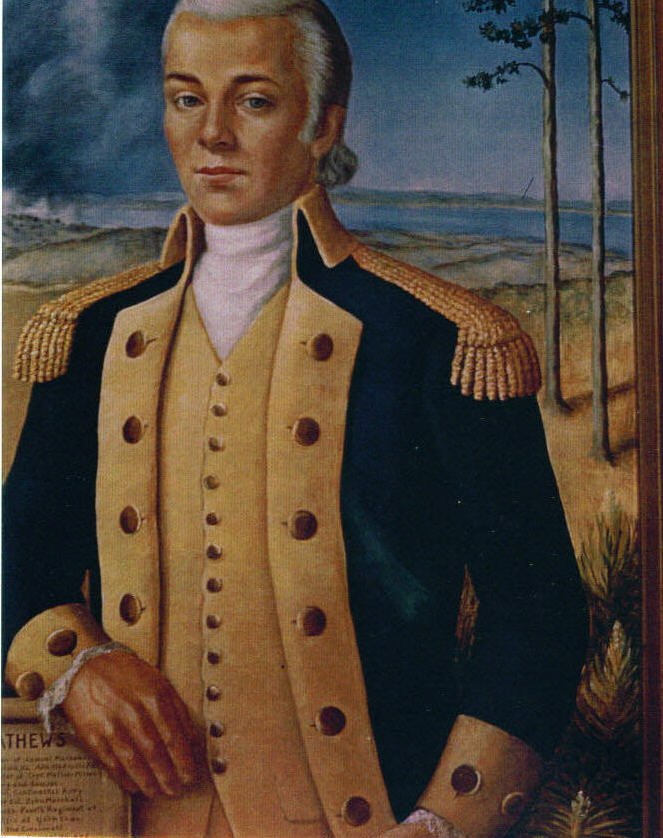

7th Speaker of the Virginia House of Delegates
- In office 1782–1793
- Preceded by: Joseph Prentis
- Succeeded by: John Wise

Member of the Virginia House of Delegates for Norfolk County
- In office December 2, 1799 – November 30, 1800 Serving with Robert Butt
- Preceded by: James S. Mathews
- Succeeded by: James Callis
- In office December 4, 1797 – December 2, 1798 Serving with Robert Shelton
- Preceded by: Thomas Newton Jr.
- Succeeded by: James S. Mathews

Member of the Virginia House of Delegates for Norfolk Borough
- In office May 3, 1784 – November 10, 1794
- Succeeded by: Thomas Newton

Member of the Virginia House of Delegates for Norfolk County
- In office May 7, 1781 – May 4, 1783 Serving with Thomas Newton Jr.
- Preceded by: James Taylor
- Succeeded by: John Kearns

Personal details
- Born: c. 1742 Saint Kitts, West Indies
- Died: 1812 Near Norfolk, Virginia

Military service
- Allegiance: United States
- Branch/service: Virginia provincial militia
- Years of service: 1776-1783
- Rank: Brigadier General
- Battles/wars: American Revolutionary War • Battle of Great Bridge • Battle of Yorktown

Thomas Mathews (1742–February 20, 1812) was an American Revolutionary War general and Virginia lawyer and politician. For almost two decades (with minor interruptions), Mathews represented variously Norfolk Borough and Norfolk County in the Virginia House of Delegates, and served as that body's Speaker from 1782 until 1793. He also represented Norfolk at the Virginia Ratifying Convention of 1788.

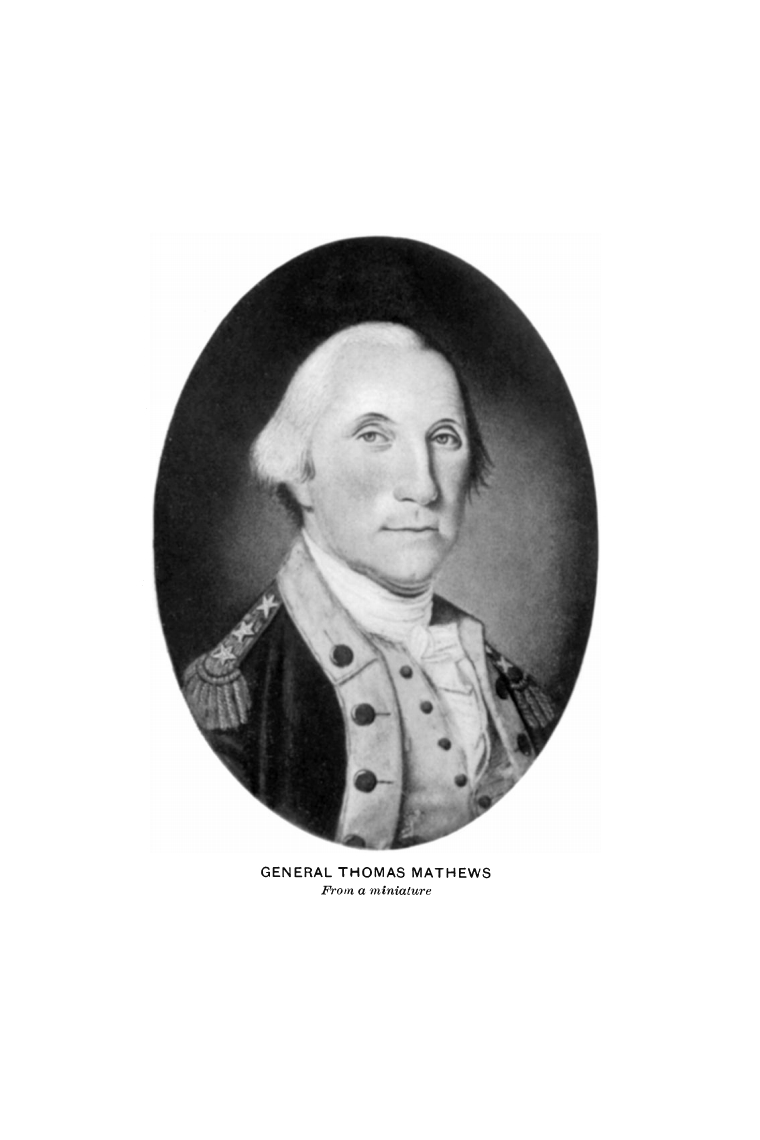
Miniature of Gen. Thomas Mathews

== Early and family life ==
Thomas Mathews was born c. 1742 on Saint Kitts, an island of the West Indies. His father was Samuel Mathews. Mathews emigrated to Virginia in 1764.

In 1773 he married Molly Miller, daughter of Captain Matthias and Ann (Eady) Miller of Norfolk County.

== Military career ==
In 1775 Mathews became Lieutenant of the Norfolk County militia, then accepted a commission as captain in 1776 and command of Fort Nelson, which protected Portsmouth, Virginia and the nearby Gosport naval yard, which was very important following the departure of Lord Dunmore from the capital at Williamsburg to British ships in the Hampton Roads area of Chesapeake Bay.

In 1777, Mathews was assigned to the artillery regiment of Col. Thomas Marshall, with the rank of major. He was in command when British General Edward Mathew landed at Port Norfolk in 1779. He received a promotion to lieutenant colonel on November 8, 1779, and another to brigadier general before the Battle of Yorktown. Mathews later became an active member of the Society of the Cincinnati.

== Political career ==
Norfolk County voters first elected Mathews as one of their representatives to the Virginia House of Delegates in 1781, and re-elected him and his fellow delegate Thomas Newton once, before Mathews' first brief gap in his part-time legislative service, in 1783. Beginning in May 1784, Mathews represented Norfolk Borough for several years, before reverting again to Norfolk County in 1797. Fellow members elected him Speaker. Mathews became the first speaker in the present Capitol building in Richmond, remaining as such through the 1793 legislation.

An eminent member of the Norfolk Bar, Mathews also represented Norfolk at the Virginia Ratifying Convention of 1788, which ratified the federal Constitution. In 1789, he was the runner-up in the election for the 8th congressional district, losing to Josiah Parker.

A candidate for the governor of Virginia, Mathews withdrew his nomination. He was a mason, and in 1790 was elected Grand Master of the Grand Lodge of Virginia. He served as grand master until 1793, at which point the office was passed to John Marshall.

In 1794, he chaired a meeting in Norfolk and drafted a petition to Congress complaining about British privateers. Mathews also chaired a meeting in Norfolk on June 24, 1807, which suspended contact between the shore and British warships and establishing a fund to aid the injured and next of kin in the U.S.S. Chesapeake Leopard incident two days before (during which HMS Leopard fired a broadside on the Norfolk-built and -based Chesapeake, killing three and wounding 18 after the British had demanded surrender of two Maryland and one Massachusetts seaman who had been impressed into the Royal Navy but had escaped and enlisted on the Chesapeake).

== Death and legacy ==
Mathews died in Norfolk borough on February 20, 1812, and was buried at St. Paul's Churchyard. A portrait of him by Mrs. William Hodges Mann Jr. hands in the courthouse in Mathews.

During his lifetime Mathews County, Virginia was named to honor him, and in 1793 he submitted a seal with a shipbuilding emblem to county officials, which became the official county seal. He has been connected to the Mathews family of Virginia by some historians, though the connection has not been made by others.

== See also ==
- Saul Matthews
