= Samuel Kello =

American politician (1748–1803)

Member of the Virginia Ratifying Convention representing Southampton County
- In office 1788 Serving with Benjamin Blunt

Personal details
- Born: 1748 Southampton County, Virginia Virginia Colony, British America
- Died: 1803 (aged 54–55)
- Spouse: Mary
- Children: Dr. James Kello, Samuel B. Kello Jr, Richard B. Kello, 2 daughters
- Profession: Planter, clerk, politician

Samuel Blythe Kello Sr. (1748 – 1803) was a planter, clerk and politician from Southampton County who represented the county at the Virginia Ratifying Convention.

== Early life ==
His father Richard Kello (1726-1789) owned a gristmill and land along the Nottoway River about four miles from what became the Southampton County seat at Jerusalem. That land had earlier been Warekeck town, formerly inhabited by the Weanock and opened for English settlement in 1699, with the reservation created by the treaty of 1713 allowed to be sold by the Virginia General Assembly in 1734, 1744, 1748, 1756 and 1772. By the 18th century, notwithstanding substantial language differences, the remaining Algonquian-speaking Weanock in this area merged into the Iroquian-speaking Nottoway people, so this became part of the Nottoway reservation in 1705, and in the early 20th century became the last site inhabited by the Nottoway people. Richard Kello served as clerk of the Southampton County Court for many years during the colonial era and twice won election to the Virginia House of Delegates as one of Southampton County's delegates during the Revolutionary War (1777-1778).

== Career ==
Kello succeeded his father and became the second clerk of the Southampton County Court, and also operated a tavern, later known as Mahone's Tavern. After the Revolutionary War the General Assembly in 1790 authorized him, Benjamin Blunt and Francis Boykin, among others, to conduct a lottery to raise funds to erect a school in Southampton County. Millfield Academy was accordingly established on land granted to the newly formed Episcopal church to erect Millfield Chapel on the road between the county seats of Southampton and Isle of Wight Counties (then Southampton Court House and Smithfield, respectively). In 1835 that school had 35 students (the most famous being future President WIlliam H. Harrison), even though about 1810 another teacher established a school in the town of Smithfield, perhaps replacing the school his father and Joseph Bridger had helped the widow Elizabeth Smith found in 1753 (just after Smithfield's incorporation). Meanwhile, in 1791 Kello was also one of the five petitioners founding the town of Southampton Court House (which the General Assembly agreed to name "Jerusalem" and now is Courtland).

In the 1787 Virginia tax census, Kello owned ten enslaved adults, and eight slaves under sixteen years old, as well as two horses, 22 cattle and a four-wheeled carriage. His father was also a planter, but in the same census no longer lived in Southampton county but paid taxes for two overseers (including his grandson of the same name), as well as eighteen enslaved adults, and eight slaves under sixteen years old, plus five horses, 36 cattle and a two-wheeled carriage.

Southampton County voters elected Benjamin Blunt and Samuel Kello as their delegates to the Virginia Ratifying Convention in 1788, and both men voted for ratification of the U.S. Constitution.

== Death and legacy ==
Kello died in 1803. His son, Samuel Kello Jr., succeeded him as the county clerk and also twice served in the Virginia General Assembly, first in the Virginia House of Delegates representing Southampton County (1853-1854), and after the Civil War in the Virginia Senate in 1867-1868 (from the district encompassing Isle of Wight, Nansemond, Surry and Southampton Counties). In 2012, the Southampton County Courthouse in Courtland unveiled a plaque honoring the service of this man, his father and his son Samuel Kello Jr., who together served 67 years as the county's court clerk.
