= Virginia Ratifying Convention =

1788 Convention ratifying the U.S. Constitution

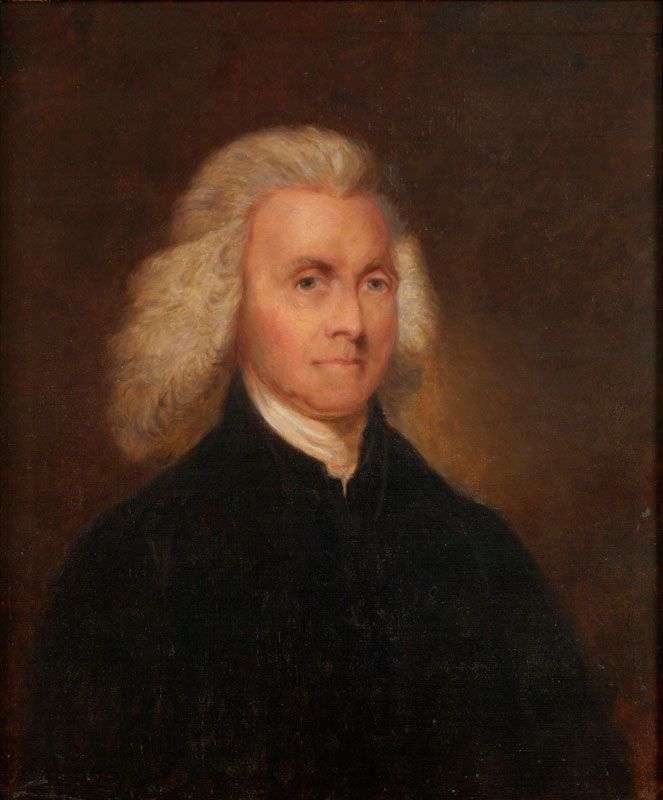
Edmund Pendleton, the presiding officer of the convention

The Virginia Ratifying Convention (also historically referred to as the "Virginia Federal Convention") was a convention of 168 delegates from Virginia who met in 1788 to ratify or reject the United States Constitution, which had been drafted at the Philadelphia Convention the previous year. The Convention met and deliberated from June 2 through June 27 in Richmond at the Richmond Theatre, presently the site of Monumental Church. Judge Edmund Pendleton, Virginia delegate to the Constitutional Convention, served as the convention's president by unanimous consent.

== Background and composition ==
The Convention convened "in the temporary capital at Cary and Fourteenth streets" on June 2, 1788, and elected Edmund Pendleton its presiding officer. The next day the Convention relocated to the Richmond Academy (later the site of the Richmond Theatre and now the site of Monumental Church where it continued to meet until June 27.)

The Virginia Ratifying Convention narrowly approved joining the proposed United States under a Constitution of supreme national law as authorized by "We, the People" of the United States. James Madison led those in favor, Patrick Henry, delegate to the First Continental Convention and Revolutionary wartime governor, led those opposed. Governor Edmund Randolph, who had refused to sign the Constitution in the Philadelphia Convention, chose Virginia's Ratifying Convention to support adoption. George Mason had refused to sign due to the lack of a Bill of Rights in Philadelphia and would continue in his opposition. The Virginia ratification included a recommendation for a Bill of Rights, and Madison subsequently led the First Congress to send the Bill of Rights to the states for ratification.

On receiving the proposed Constitution from the Philadelphia Convention, Congress initiated a ratification procedure for the proposed Constitution which by-passed the sitting state legislatures, going directly to the people of the country, state by state. Four delegates, James Madison with Edmund Randolph for the Federalists and Patrick Henry with George Mason for the Anti-federalists made most of the speeches of the Convention; 149 of the 170 delegates were silent. An early estimate gave the Federalists seeking ratification a slim margin of 86 to Anti-Federalists rejecting at 80, with four unknowns. Federalists came from the Tidewater and Northern Neck, the Shenandoah Valley, and western counties, although the Kentucky counties along the Ohio River feared being abandoned to the Spanish under the new government. The Anti-federalists found strength in the central Piedmont, Southside, and southwest counties.

== Meeting and debate ==
Unlike the Philadelphia Constitutional Convention, the Virginia Ratifying Convention was open to the public and crowds filled the galleries along with the press. Delegates changed sides over the debates, demonstrators paraded in the streets, and the press churned out accounts of the proceedings along with commentary pamphlets. The Federalist Papers first became a factor in state ratification conventions outside New York in Virginia. Although a majority of Virginians were said to be against adoption of the Constitution, and the Anti-federalists had the oratorical advantage with Patrick Henry, the Federalists were better organized under the leadership of judges who had been trained by George Wythe, and former Continental Army officers who aligned with George Washington.

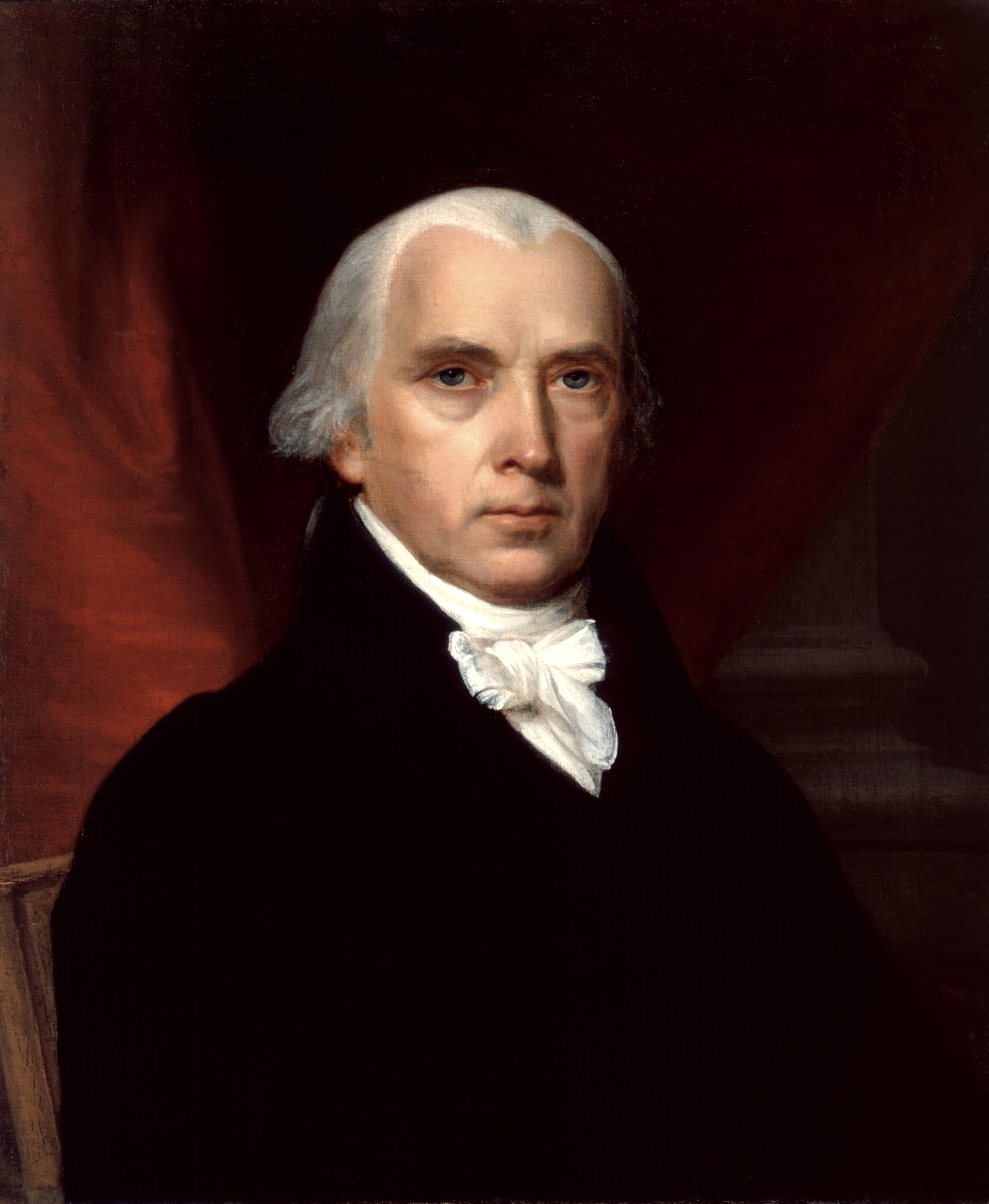
James Madison
Federalist

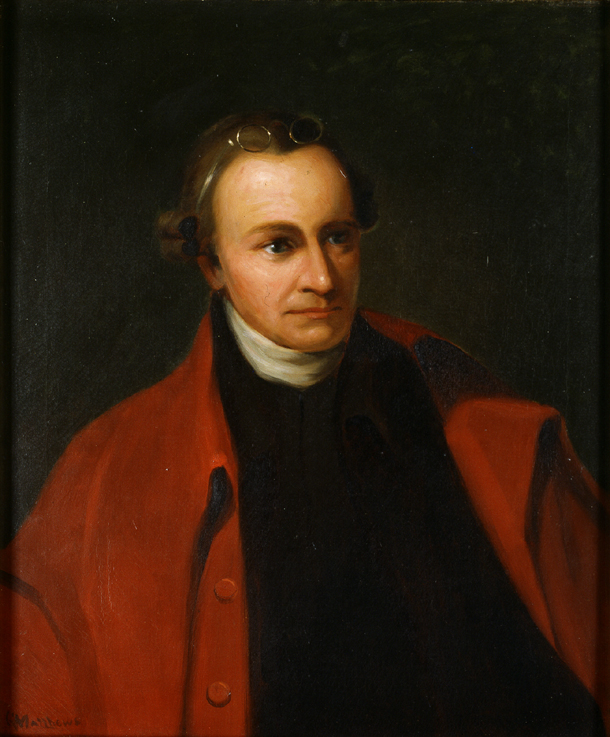
Patrick Henry
Anti-Federalist

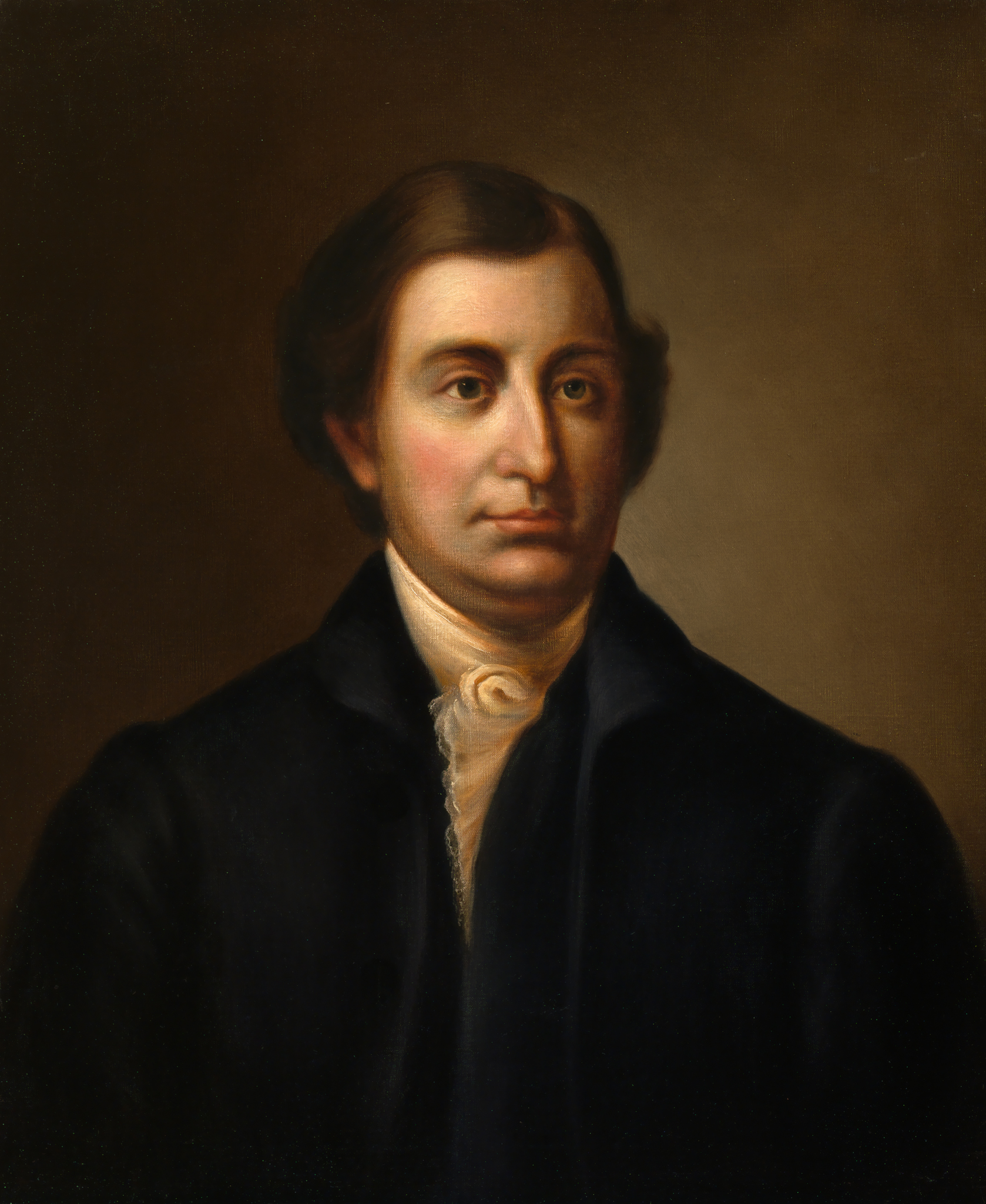
Edmund Randolph
Federalist

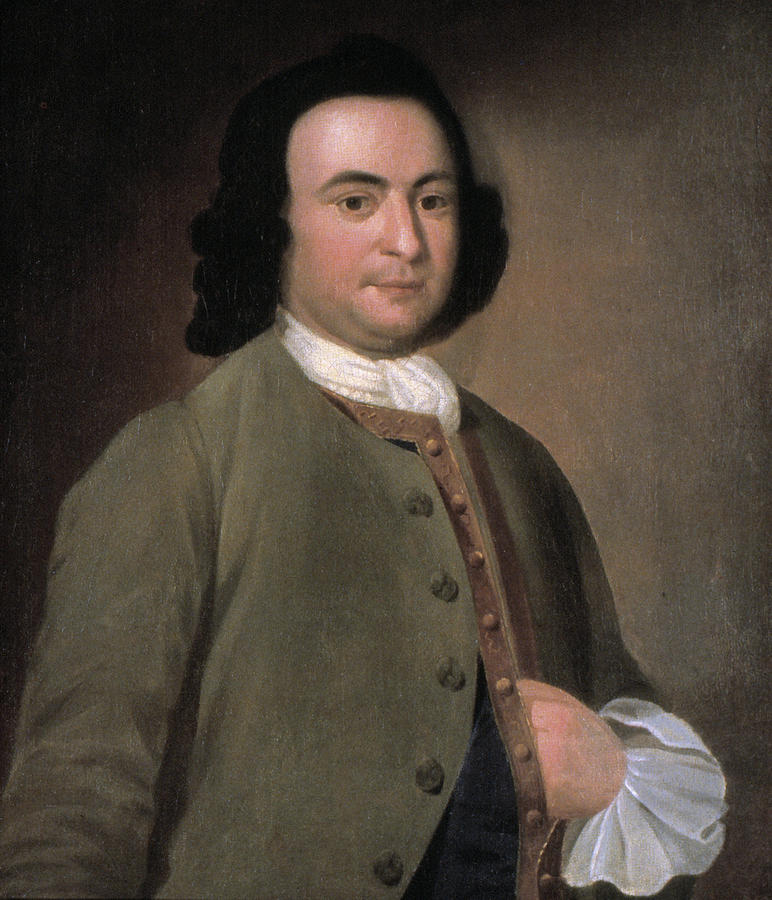
George Mason
Anti-Federalist

Patrick Henry questioned the authority of the Philadelphia Convention to presume to speak for "We, the people" instead of "We, the states". In his view, delegates should have only recommended amendments to the Articles of Confederation. Consolidated government would put an end to Virginia's liberties and state government. Nine states making a new nation without the rest would abrogate treaties and place Virginia in great peril. Edmund Randolph had changed from his opposition in the Philadelphia Convention to now supporting adoption for the sake of preserving the Union. He noted that the Confederation was "totally inadequate" and leading to American downfall. The new Constitution would repair the inadequacies of the Articles. If something were not done, the Union would be lost. The new government should be based on the people who would be governed by it, not the intermediary states. The Constitution should be ratified, along with any "practical" amendments, after the new nation was begun.

George Mason countered that a national, consolidated government would overburden Virginians with direct taxes in addition to state taxes, and that government of an extensive territory must necessarily destroy liberty. Although he conceded that the Confederation government was "inefficient", he wanted a clear line between the jurisdictions of the federal and state governments, including the judiciary, because he feared the shared powers would lead to "the destruction of one or the other." Madison pointed out that the history of Confederations like that provided in the Articles of Confederation government were inadequate in the long run, both with the ancient and with the modern (1700s) Germans, Dutch and Swiss. They brought "anarchy and confusion", disharmony and foreign invasion. Efficient government can only come from direct operation on individuals, it can never flow from negotiations among a confederation's constituent states. The proposed Constitution creates a republic with each branch of government grounded in the people without hereditary offices. Its mixed nature was both federated and consolidated, but in all cases was based on "the superior power of the people". The states would remain important because the House of Representatives were chosen by people in each state, and the Senate was chosen by the state legislatures. The Constitution limited the national government to enumerated powers.

The Virginia Ratification (Federal) Convention made a final vote on George Wythe's motion to ratify, passing it 89 to 79. Virginians reserved the right to withdraw from the new government. The remedy for federal "injury or oppression" included amending the Constitution. Unlike the Pennsylvania Convention where the Federalists railroaded the Anti-federalists in an all or nothing choice, in the Virginia Convention the Federalists had made efforts to reconcile with the Anti-federalists by recommending amendments like that of Virginia's Bill of Rights preamble to its 1776 Constitution. The American experiment was imagined to become one of successive constitutional changes to meet changing circumstances.

== Outcomes ==
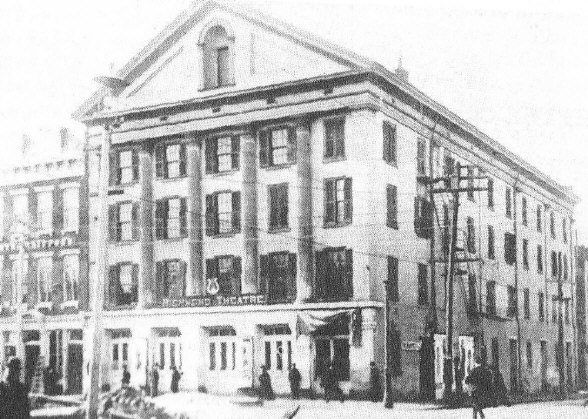
"Old Capitol" where the Ratifying (Federal) Convention met in 1788. This is not the building used, as the Richmond Theatre fire of 1811 destroyed the Richmond Theater on Broad St (H St at the time). The "Old Capitol" was at 14th and Cary St.

Virginia was the tenth state to ratify the new Constitution. New York followed a month later on July 26, 1788. The new government began operating with eleven states on March 4, 1789.

The convention recommended the addition of a bill of rights but did not make ratification contingent upon it.

Many of the ideas presented during this convention were later incorporated into the United States Bill of Rights. James Madison, elected to Congress from his home district was a floor leader in the first session of the First Congress. Madison rewrote the various state proposals into twelve proposals from Congress as amended, sent to the States for ratification by three-fourths of them.

Patrick Henry's hostility to the government under the Constitution was so strong that he subsequently refused to join it, turning down offers to serve as United States Secretary of State and as a justice of the United States Supreme Court. His control of the Virginia legislature enabled his partisans to elect the only two Anti-Federalist U.S. Senators in the First Congress.

== List of delegates and votes on ratification ==
The following list is of the delegates to the Virginia ratifying convention and their vote on ratification. A total of 170 delegates were elected. Of these, 168 voted on ratification: 89 for, 79 against. The delegates included representatives from modern-day Kentucky and West Virginia, which were part of Virginia at the time.

Plaque marking the site of the Virginia Federal Constitution, Richmond VA

County/City	Name	Vote on Ratification	
Accomac	Edmund Custis	No	
Accomac	George Parker	Yes	
Albemarle	George Nicholas	Yes	
Albemarle	Wilson Cary Nicholas	Yes	
Amelia	John Pride	No	
Amelia	Edmund Booker	No	
Amherst	William Cabell	No	
Amherst	Samuel Jordan Cabell	No	
Augusta	Zachariah Johnston	Yes	
Augusta	Archibald Stuart	Yes	
Bedford	John Trigg	No	
Bedford	Charles Clay	No	
Berkeley	William Darke (or Dark)	Yes	
Berkeley	Adam Stephen	Yes	
Botetourt	William Fleming	Yes	
Botetourt	Martin M'Ferran (or McFerran)	Yes	
Bourbon	Henry Lee (of Bourbon)	No	
Bourbon	Notley Conn	Did not vote	
Brunswick	John Jones	No	
Brunswick	Binns Jones	No	
Buckingham	Charles Patteson	No	
Buckingham	David Bell	No	
Campbell	Robert Alexander	No	
Campbell	Edmund Winston	No	
Caroline	Edmund Pendleton	Yes	
Caroline	James Taylor (of Caroline)	Yes	
Charlotte	Thomas Read	No	
Charlotte	Paul Carrington	Yes	
Charles City	Benjamin Harrison V	No	
Charles City	John Tyler, Sr.	No	
Chesterfield	David Patteson	Yes	
Chesterfield	Stephen Pankey, Jr.	No	
Cumberland	Joseph Michaux	No	
Cumberland	Thomas H. Drew	No	
Culpeper	French Strother	No	
Culpeper	Joel Early	No	
Dinwiddie	Joseph Jones	No	
Dinwiddie	William Watkins	No	
Elizabeth City	Miles King	Yes	
Elizabeth City	Worlich Westwood	Yes	
Essex	James Upshaw (or Upshur)	No	
Essex	Meriwether Smith	No	
Fairfax	David Stuart	Yes	
Fairfax	Charles Simms	Yes	
Fayette	Humphrey Marshall	Yes	
Fayette	John Fowler	No	
Fauquier	Martin Pickett	Yes	
Fauquier	Humphrey Brooke	Yes	
Fluvanna	Samuel Richardson	No	
Fluvanna	Joseph Haden	No	
Franklin	John Early	No	
Franklin	Thomas Arthur		No
Frederick	John Sheaman Woodcock	Yes	
Frederick	Alexander White	Yes	
Gloucester	Warner Lewis	Yes	
Gloucester	Thomas Smith Jr.	Yes	
Goochland	John Guerrant	No	
Goochland	William Sampson	No	
Greenbrier	George Clendenin	Yes	
Greenbrier	John Stuart	Yes	
Greensville	William Mason	Yes	
Greensville	Daniel Fisher	Yes	
Halifax	Isaac Coles	No	
Halifax	George Carrington	No	
Hampshire	Andrew Woodrow	Yes	
Hampshire	Ralph Humphreys	Yes	
Hanover	Parke Goodall	No	
Hanover	John Carter Littlepage	No	
Hardy	Isaac Van Meter	Yes	
Hardy	Abel Seymour	Yes	
Harrison	George Jackson	Yes	
Harrison	John Prunty	Yes	
Henrico	Governor Edmund Randolph	Yes	
Henrico	John Marshall	Yes	
Henry	Thomas Cooper	No	
Henry	John Marr	No	
Isle of Wight	Thomas Pierce		
Isle of Wight	James Johnson	Yes	
James City	Nathaniel Burwell	Yes	
James City	Robert Andrews	Yes	
Jefferson	Robert Breckenridge	Yes	
Jefferson	Rice Bullock	Yes	
King and Queen	William Fleet	Yes	
King and Queen	John Roane		
King George	Burdett Ashton	Yes	
King George	William Thornton	Yes	
King William	Holt Richeson	No	
King William	Benjamin Temple	No	
Lancaster	James Gordon Sr. (of Lancaster)	Yes	
Lancaster	Henry Towles	Yes	
Loudoun	Stevens Thomson Mason	No	
Loudoun	Leven Powell	Yes	
Louisa	William Overton Callis	Yes	
Louisa	William White	No	
Lunenburg	Jonathan Patteson	No	
Lunenburg	Christopher Robertson	No	
Lincoln	John Logan	No	
Lincoln	Henry Pawling	No	
Madison	John Miller	No	
Madison	Green Clay	No	
Mecklenburg	Samuel Hopkins, Jr.	No	
Mecklenburg	Richard Kennon	No	
Mercer	Thomas Allen	No	
Mercer	Alexander Robertson	No	
Middlesex	Relph Wormeley, Jr.	Yes	
Middlesex	Francis Corbin	Yes	
Monongalia	John Evans	No	
Monongalia	William McClerry	Yes	
Montgomery	Walter Crockett	No	
Montgomery	Abraham Trigg	No	
Nansemond	Willis Riddick	Yes	
Nansemond	Solomon Shepherd	Yes	
New Kent	William Clayton	Yes	
New Kent	Burwell Bassett	Yes	
Nelson	Matthew Walton	No	
Nelson	John Steele	No	
Norfolk	James Webb	Yes	
Norfolk	James Taylor (of Norfolk)	Yes	
Northampton	John Stringer	Yes	
Northampton	Littleton Eyre	Yes	
Northumberland	Walter Jones	Yes	
Northumberland	Thomas Gaskins	Yes	
Ohio	Archibald Woods	Yes	
Ohio	Ebenezer Zane	Yes	
Orange	James Madison, Jr.	Yes	
Orange	James Gordon, Jr. (of Orange)	Yes	
Pittsylvania	Robert Williams	No	
Pittsylvania	John Wilson	No	
Powhatan	William Ronald (or Roland)	Yes	
Powhatan	Thomas Turpin, Jr.	No	
Prince Edward	Patrick Henry	No	
Prince Edward	Robert Lawson	No	
Prince George	Theodorick Bland (or Theodoric Bland)	No	
Prince George	Edmund Ruffin	No	
Prince William	William Grayson	No	
Prince William	Cuthbert Bullitt	No	
Princess Anne	Anthony Walke	Yes	
Princess Anne	Thomas Walke	Yes	
Randolph	Benjamin Wilson	Yes	
Randolph	John Wilson (of Randolph)	Yes	
Richmond	Walker Tomlin	Yes	
Richmond	William Peachy	Yes	
Rockbridge	William McKee	Yes	
Rockbridge	Andrew Moore	Yes	
Rockingham	Thomas Lewis	Yes	
Rockingham	Gabriel Jones	Yes	
Russell	Thomas Carter	No	
Russell	Henry Dickenson (or Dickinson)	No	
Shenandoah	Jacob Rinker	Yes	
Shenandoah	John Williams	Yes	
Southampton	Benjamin Blunt	Yes	
Southampton	Samuel Kello (or Killo)	Yes	
Spotsylvania	James Monroe	No	
Spotsylvania	John Dawson	No	
Stafford	George Mason	No	
Stafford	Andrew Buchanan	No	
Surry	John Hartwell Cocke Sr.	Yes	
Surry	John Allen	Yes	
Sussex	John Howell Briggs	No	
Sussex	Thomas Edmunds	No	
Warwick	Cole Digges	Yes	
Warwick	Hon. Richard Cary	No	
Washington	Samuel Edmiston		
Washington	James Montgomery	No	
Westmoreland	Henry Lee III (of Westmoreland)	Yes	
Westmoreland	Bushrod Washington	Yes	
York	Hon. John Blair Jr.	Yes	
York	Hon. George Wythe	Yes	
Williamsburg	James Innes	Yes	
Norfolk Borough	Thomas Mathews (or Matthews)	Yes	

== See also ==
- Virginia Conventions
