= John Pride =

American politician

Speaker of the Virginia Senate
- In office 1789–1793
- Preceded by: John Jones
- Succeeded by: Paul Carrington

Member of the Virginia Senate from Amelia, Chesterfield, Cumberland and Powhatan Counties
- In office October 15, 1787 – November 10, 1794
- Preceded by: Archibald Cary
- Succeeded by: Everard Meade

Member of the Virginia House of Delegates representing Amelia County
- In office October 16, 1786 – October 16, 1791 Serving with Joseph Eggleston Jr.
- Preceded by: Samuel Sherwin
- Succeeded by: Davis Booker
- In office May 4, 1778 – January __, 1782 Serving with Thomas Bolling MunfordSamuel Sherwin, Everard Meade and William Royall
- Preceded by: John Winn
- Succeeded by: Everard Meade

Personal details
- Born: circa 1737 Amelia County, Virginia Colony, British America
- Died: 1794 Amelia County, Virginia, U.S.
- Party: Anti-Federalist

John Pride III (after around 1737 – 1794) was an American politician and planter from Virginia. Pride served as Clerk of Court for Amelia County before the American Revolutionary War, then part-time in both houses of the Virginia General Assembly. He was the second of four speakers of the Virginia Senate from that area before the American Civil War. Pride also held local offices, as well as served as a delegate to the Virginia Ratifying Convention of 1788, and twice served as a presidential elector (1789 and 1792).

== Early life and education ==
Probably born in York County near the colonial capital, to the former Frances Rowlett and her husband (also) John Pride. He received an education appropriate to his class and had married and settled in Amelia County around 1760. His parents probably married around 1737. His father had received 220 acres (0.89 km^{2}) on Swift Creek near the Appomattox River in 1733, in then-developing Amelia County, and moved there by 1746.

== Career ==
His father built a house, which by 1820 was located near the town of Prideville (named to honor Pride Sr., but later renamed Truxillo). This Pride apprenticed to Thomas Griffin Peachy, who served as Clerk of Court for Amelia county, and succeeded Peachy in 1769. Thus Pride served as Clerk of Court in the years before the Revolution. He also served as clerk for the local committee of safety.

During the conflict, Amelia County voters elected Pride as one of their representatives (part-time) to the Virginia House of Delegates in 1778, alongside Thomas Bolling Munford (replacing John Winn). They re-elected Pride until 1782, when merchant John Tabb replaced him, so Pride served alongside Samuel Sherwin, Everard Meade and William Royall. He was again elected as one of Amelia Counties delegates in 1786–87. He served on the Courts and Justice and Religion committees.

In 1787, Pride succeeded Archibald Cary in the Senate of Virginia (1787–93), representing a district consisting of Chesterfield, Amelia, Cumberland and Powhatan Counties. During that term, Amelia voters elected Pride and some-time sheriff Edmund Booker as their representatives to the Virginia Ratifying Convention of 1788. Although the convention ultimately narrowly ratified the United States Constitution, both Booker and Pride voted against ratification, and for added amendments, which later became the Bill of Rights.

After the convention, fellow senators elected Pride as their speaker from 1789 until 1793, and Everard Meade would succeed to the seat, although not the speakership. As Speaker of the Virginia Senate, Pride signed the resolutions dated 15 December 1791 ratifying the Bill of Rights. Meanwhile, on 4 January 1779 Price received £82-8-0 for his wages as delegate from Amelia County. On 22 December 1781, the serjeant at arms was ordered to take Pride and a number of other delegates into his custody Finally, on 1 December 1790, likewise as the Virginia Senate's Speaker, Pride signed a letter to other state legislatures requesting their co-operation in procuring 'the admission of the citizens of the United States to hear the debates of the United States Senate whenever they are sitting in their legislative capacity.'

During his senatorial term, Pride was named as trustee in two laws passed by the Virginia General Assembly. The law passed on 17 December 1787 named him as a trustee of funds to be raised for clearing, improving and extending the navigation of the Appomattox River. Four years later the Act passed on December 1, 1791 named Pride as a trustee of funds to be raised by Scottville Lodge of Free Masons for building an Academy.

Pride also served as Presidential elector twice, although his district changed. In the 1789 election the Amelia District included Amelia, Chesterfield, Cumberland and Powhatan Counties Pride represented in the state senate, as well as Brunswick, Greensville, Lunenburg and Mecklenburg Counties (all between the James River west of Petersburg, Virginia and then south to the state border with North Carolina). All 10 electors from Virginia cast one of their two votes for George Washington, and Pride's Anti-Federalist proclivities probably made him one of the three electors who cast their other vote for George Clinton rather than John Adams, John Hancock or John Jay. Clinton was a leading Anti-Federalist, Pride was again chosen as a presidential elector in 1792, but this time his district coincided with his former state senate district since Nottoway County had been formed out of the western edge of Amelia County.

Pride was elected as a vestryman of Raleigh Parish in Amelia County in 1790. He vigorously fought privatization of the glebe lands to fund erection of a new courthouse after the creation of Nottaway County meant th old courthouse was no longer centrally located.

== Planter ==
Pride also farmed using enslaved labor, and relinquished his government clerkship in 1775 (two years after his father's death) in order to manage his inherited property. In the 1787 Virginia tax census, Pride paid faxes on 19 enslaved teenagers as well as ten enslaved adults, ten horses and 23 cattle in Amelia County. He or another nonresident of Chesterfield County with the same name paid taxes on nine enslaved teenagers there, as well as nineteen adult slaves, eleven horses and sixteen cattle.

== Personal life ==
Pride married and survived his wife, leaving his estate to his children John Pride Jr., Rebecca and Ann Cary Pride (d. 1837). Several descendants would also be called John Pride (one of whom served in the War of 1812) and remained in Amelia County. The John T. Pride who was reimbursed for providing enslaved labor in Yorktown and Richmond may have been related by not a descendant. No location was given for CSA surgeon John T. Pride, and Private John Pride of West Virginia's 14th infantry fought for the Union.

== Death and legacy ==
Pride wrote his last will in April 1794, and it was admitted to probate that September. He was buried in the family cemetery near his home. That property (near the intersection of modern Routes 621 and 644) would later be called "Cherry Grove", and would be owned by the Wood and Johnson families.
