= List of former primary state highways in Virginia (Salem District) =

The following is a list of former primary state highways completely or mostly within the Salem District (VDOT District 2) of the U.S. state of Virginia.

== SR 102 ==
State Route 102
- Location: Radford-Meadows of Dan
- Existed: 1928–1955

State Route 102 connected Radford and Meadows of Dan along present secondary State Routes 787, 799, and 758. The route began at US 11 within Radford city limits, where SR 177 now ends, overlapped US 221 at Willis, and ended at US 58 near the eastern edge of Meadows of Dan.

The state took over the first portions of SR 102 in 1928 as State Route 210, extending 28 miles (45 km) north from SR 205 (now US 221) at Willis to almost Radford. Since this was not quite enough mileage to reach SR 10 (now Auburn Avenue) at Rock Road (the former Southwestern Turnpike) east of the Radford city limits, a small addition was made in 1931 to connect SR 210 and the nearby SR 211 to SR 10.

In the meantime, a southerly extension of SR 210 was in progress, with 5 miles (8.0 km) south from SR 205 and 2 miles (3.2 km) north from Meadows of Dan acquired in 1930. The north end of this portion was temporarily set at Shelors Mill in 1931, meaning that 5 miles of present SR 726 (Black Ridge Road) were maintained as a primary state highway for several years. In 1932, the route from Willis was instead adopted, and a further 3.65 miles (5.87 km) were added at the Willis end. The old route from Shelors Mill was not disposed of until 1934.

SR 210 became SR 102 in the 1933 renumbering; later that year, the gap north of Meadows of Dan was filled, making the route complete from Radford. In 1937 the Radford end was extended over what had been part of US 11 and then briefly US 11 Alternate to a new terminus within Radford city limits.

Elimination of SR 102 began in 1943, when the part south of Willis was downgraded to a secondary route, becoming SR 799 and an extension of existing SR 758. The remainder survived until 1951, when it too was dropped (becoming SR 787) pending completion of ongoing construction work to improve the road quality. This work was completed in 1954 or 1955, and in the latter year the portion within Radford city limits became an ordinary city street. The Radford end would return to the primary system in 1962 as part of SR 177, a connection to Interstate 81.

Major intersections

County	Location	mi	km	Destinations	Notes
Patrick	Meadows of Dan			US 58 (J.E.B. Stuart Highway)	
Floyd				Blue Ridge Parkway south	south end of Blue Ridge Pkwy. overlap
Floyd				Blue Ridge Parkway north	north end of Blue Ridge Pkwy. overlap
Floyd	Willis			US 221 north (Floyd Highway South) – Roanoke	south end of US 221 overlap
Floyd				US 221 south (Floyd Highway South) – Hillsville	north end of US 221 overlap
Montgomery	No major junctions				
City of Radford				SR 110 south (Tyler Avenue)	current SR 177 south
City of Radford				Rock Road East - Christiansburg	former US 11 north (until 1937)
City of Radford				US 11 (East Main Street)	
1.000 mi = 1.609 km; 1.000 km = 0.621 mi

== SR 104 ==
State Route 104
- Location: Claudville-North Carolina
- Existed: 1928–1949

State Route 104 extended west and southwest from SR 103 at Claudville to the North Carolina state line in the direction of Mount Airy. SR 104 has been secondary SR 773 since 1949, but the North Carolina side remains primary NC 104 to this day.

State Route 200 was created in 1928 to run west 18 miles (29 km) from SR 23 (now SR 8) at Joyce's Filling Station (near Five Forks) towards the state line via or near Kibler and Ararat. In 1929 the State Highway Commission considered rerouting SR 200 to run southwest from Claudville to meet North Carolina Highway 80 (now NC 103), but was unable to do so because the westerly route had already been taken over. (This road was added in 1930 as SR 220.) In the 1933 renumbering, the portion of SR 200 east of Claudville was combined with SR 220 to create SR 103, with the stub west of Claudville becoming SR 104. SR 104 was extended to the state line in 1934, and North Carolina renumbered NC 800 to match in 1940. Less than a decade later, in 1949, Virginia downgraded its portion of the route to secondary.

Major intersections

The entire route is in Patrick County.

Location	mi	km	Destinations	Notes
	0.00	0.00	NC 104 south (Riverside Drive) – Mt. Airy	North Carolina state line
Claudville	12.15	19.55	SR 103 (Claudville Highway) – Stuart, Mt. Airy	
1.000 mi = 1.609 km; 1.000 km = 0.621 mi

== SR 105 ==
State Route 105
- Location: Critz
- Existed: 1932–1942

State Route 105 used a portion of present secondary SR 626 (Abram Penn Highway) in Patrick County, beginning at US 58 southeast of Patrick Springs and extending north through Critz for 5.66 miles (9.11 km). SR 626 continues northeast into Henry County, ending at SR 687 at Sanville.

The road was added to the primary state highway system in 1932, with no number given, and assigned SR 105 in the 1933 renumbering, at which time the description indicated that it ran in the direction of Sanville. Never extended beyond its initial terminus, the road was downgraded to secondary in 1942 as an extension of existing SR 626.

Major intersections

The entire route is in Patrick County.

Location	mi	km	Destinations	Notes
	0.00	0.00	US 58 (J.E.B. Stuart Highway)	
Critz			SR 798 (Homestead Lane) – Reynolds Homestead	
	5.66	9.11	SR 626 (Abram Penn Highway)	
1.000 mi = 1.609 km; 1.000 km = 0.621 mi

== SR 107 ==
State Route 107
- Location: Axton-North Carolina
- Existed: 1932–1953

State Route 107 extended south from US 58 at Axton to the North Carolina state line in the direction of Eden. It is now SR 610 (Axton Road), which has never connected to a primary highway in North Carolina.

2.35 miles (3.78 km) of road south from Axton were added to the state highway system in 1932, with no number given. Numbered SR 107 in the 1933 renumbering, it was extended south another 4.77 miles (7.68 km) in 1934, and the remaining 2.78 miles (4.47 km) to the state line in 1935, replacing what had briefly been secondary SR 602. The entire route was downgraded to secondary in 1953.

Major intersections

The entire route is in Henry County.

Location	mi	km	Destinations	Notes
	0.00	0.00	Virginia Street - Eden	North Carolina state line
Axton	9.90	15.93	US 58 (A.L. Philpott Highway) / SR 647 (Mountain Valley Road)	
1.000 mi = 1.609 km; 1.000 km = 0.621 mi

== SR 109 ==
State Route 109
- Location: Floyd-Endicott
- Existed: 1930–1946

State Route 109 followed current secondary SR 860 from US 221 northeast of Floyd southeast and east to SR 40 west of Endicott. 2 miles (3.2 km) at the Floyd end and 3 miles (4.8 km) at the Endicott, Virginia end were added to the state highway system in 1930 as State Route 222. Another 3.4 miles (5.5 km) were added at the Floyd end in 1932, and in the 1933 renumbering the route became SR 109; the gap was filled later that year. In 1946 the road was downgraded to the secondary system.

== SR 110 ==
State Route 110
- Location: Radford-Riner
- Existed: 1928–1946

State Route 110 ran southeast from SR 102 (now Rock Road East) outside Radford to SR 8 north of Riner, mostly on portions of current SR 177, SR 666, SR F59, and SR 658. 4.4 miles (7.1 km) at the Riner end became State Route 211 in 1928, Another 1 mile (1.6 km) was added in 1929, and in 1931 it was extended the rest of the way to SR 210 (later SR 102). SR 211 became SR 110 in the 1933 renumbering, and in 1946 it was downgraded to secondary. The Radford end would return to the primary system in 1962 as part of SR 177, a connection to Interstate 81.

== SR 112 ==
State Route 112
- Location: Newport-Mountain Lake
- Existed: 1931–1943

State Route 112 extended north from SR 8 (now SR 783, an old alignment of modern US 460) between Maybrook and Newport along current SR 700 (the old Mountain Lake and Salt Sulphur Springs Turnpike) to SR 613 at Mountain Lake. 4.1 miles (6.6 km) at the south end were added to the primary state highway system in 1931 as State Route 224, and extended the rest of the way to Mountain Lake in 1932. In the 1933 renumbering, SR 224 was renumbered 112, which was downgraded to secondary in 1943.

== SR 113 ==
State Route 113
- Location: Craig Springs-SR 311
- Existed: 1928–1942

State Route 113 followed current SR 658 from SR 635 at Craig Springs east to SR 311. 6 miles (9.7 km) at the east end became State Route 214 in 1928, and in 1930 it was extended the remaining 1.1 miles (1.8 km) to Craig Springs. SR 214 became SR 113 in the 1933 renumbering, and it was downgraded to secondary in 1942.

== SR 245 ==
State Route 245
- Location: Ferrum-north, Boones Mill-southwest
- Existed: 1930–1942

State Route 245 extended north from SR 40 at Ferrum for about 4.5 miles (7.2 km) on modern SR 602, ending at SR 640 (Six Mile Post Road). Prior to the 1940 renumbering, SR 245 was State Route 120, which included a disconnected second section southwest for 5 miles (8.0 km) along current SR 739 from US 220 (now SR 1606) in Boones Mill to about 1/4 mile (0.40 km) short of SR 643 (Dillons Mill Road). These two modern secondary routes meet in Algoma, which was on the intended route for a continuous SR 120; SR 602 continues north into Roanoke County to US 221 at Adney Gap.

The Ferrum end came from excess authorized mileage not needed for other routes. In early 1930, an unused 1.5 miles (2.4 km) for Franklin County was assigned to the road from Ferrum in the direction of High Peak (along SR 640 just over the Floyd County line), which received the State Route 219 designation. This was extended another 3 miles (4.8 km) in early 1931 from mileage that had been assigned to SR 222 but was unneeded; it was now described as being in the direction of Callaway.

State Route 223 was assigned to a new 5 miles (8.0 km) route at the Boones Mill end in late 1930, running in the direction of Algoma (where SR 602 and SR 739 now intersect). The two pieces were combined in 1931 or 1932 as SR 219, and in the 1933 renumbering both segments became SR 120. The state legislature downgraded the Boones Mill end to secondary in 1936 (with the mileage reassigned to an extension of SR 41), and it became an extension of existing SR 739. The Ferrum end became SR 245 in the 1940 renumbering and was downgraded in 1942 as an extension of existing SR 602.

== SR 294 ==
State Route 294
- Location: Troutville-Trinity
- Existed: 1925–1942

State Route 294 was assigned to present secondary SR 670 (Trinity Road) from US 11 at Troutville north to US 220 at Trinity. The road was added to the state highway system in 1925 and 1926 as part of SR 142, and in the latter year it instead became part of a realigned SR 17, which was renumbered SR 12 in the 1933 renumbering. When US 220 was extended into Virginia in 1935, it was routed along most of SR 12, but south of Trinity it instead followed when was then secondary SR 671 to Daleville (upgraded to primary later that year). The route to Troutville was renumbered 294, which was downgraded to secondary in 1942 as an extension of existing SR 670.

Major intersections

The entire route is in Botetourt County.

Location	mi	km	Destinations	Notes
Troutville	0.00	0.00	US 11 (Lee Highway)	
Trinity	2.96	4.76	US 220 (Roanoke Road) – Fincastle	
1.000 mi = 1.609 km; 1.000 km = 0.621 mi
