= Virginia State Route 220 =

The following highways in Virginia have been known as State Route 220:

- State Route 220 (Virginia 1930–1933), now part of Virginia State Route 103
- State Route 220 (Virginia 1933), 1933 – mid-1930s, spur of Virginia State Route 30 to Pamunkey Indian Reservation
- U.S. Route 220 in Virginia, mid-1930s – present

State Route 220 Alternate (Virginia), 1978 – present, an alternate route of U.S. Route 220
