= Bleak Hill (Callaway, Virginia) =

Historic house in Virginia, United States

- U.S. National Register of Historic Places
- Virginia Landmarks Register
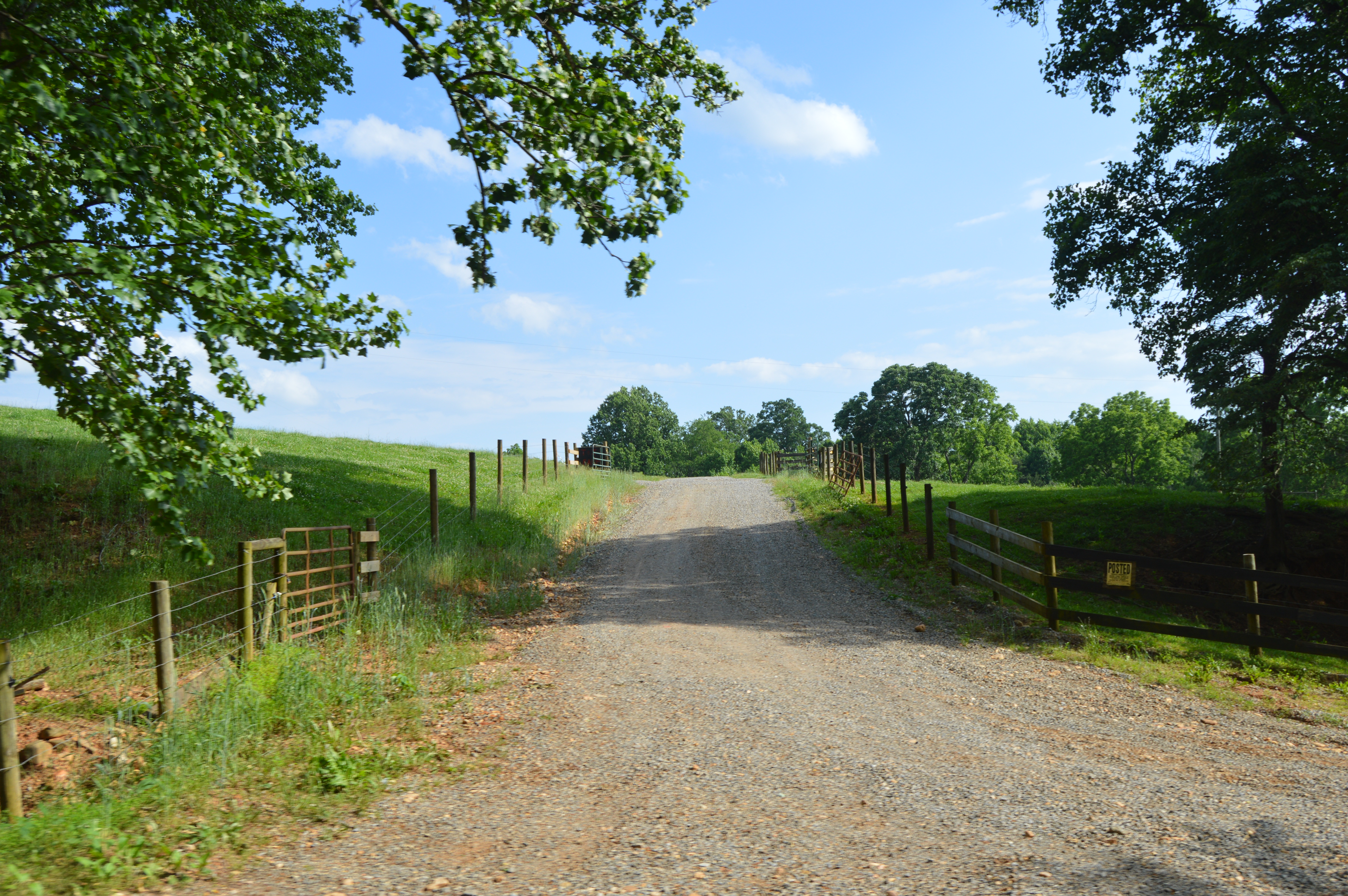
- Entrance to the property

- Location within Virginia Location within the United States
- Nearest city: Callaway, Virginia
- Coordinates: 36.97033°N 80.03543°W
- Area: 20.5 acres (8.3 ha)
- Built: 1858, c. 1820
- Architectural style: Italianate
- NRHP reference No.: 02001374
- VLR No.: 033-0002

Significant dates
- Added to NRHP: November 21, 2002
- Designated VLR: September 11, 2002

Bleak Hill is a historic plantation house and farm located close to the headwaters of the Pigg River near Callaway, Franklin County, Virginia. Replacing a house that burned in January 1830, it was built between 1856 and 1857 by Peter Saunders, Junior, who lived there until his death in 1905. Later the house, outbuildings, and adjoining land were sold to the Lee family. The main house is the two-story, three-bay, double pile, asymmetrical brick dwelling in the Italianate style. It measures approximately 40 feet by 42 feet and has a projecting two-story ell. Also on the property are a contributing two rows of frame, brick, and log outbuildings built about 1820: a two-story brick law office, a brick summer kitchen, a frame single dwelling, and a log smokehouse. Also on the property are two contributing pole barns built about 1930.

It was listed on the National Register of Historic Places in 1996.
