= North Carolina Highway 103 =

State highway in Surry County, North Carolina, US

North Carolina Highway 103

Route information
- Maintained by NCDOT
- Length: 8.5 mi (13.7 km)
- Existed: 1940–present

Major junctions
- West end: US 52 Bus. / NC 89 in Mount Airy
- East end: SR 103 at the Virginia state line near Slate Mountain

Location
- Country: United States
- State: North Carolina
- Counties: Surry

Highway system
- North Carolina Highway System; Interstate; US; State; Scenic
← NC 102	→ NC 104

North Carolina Highway 103 (NC 103) is a primary state highway in the U.S. state of North Carolina. It runs entirely in Surry County. It connects the city of Mount Airy with the northern end of Surry County and Virginia State Route 103 (SR 103). A 6-mile (9.7 km) segment of the highway is known as the Donna Fargo Highway, named to honor a local country music star.

== Route description ==
The western terminus is at NC 89 and U.S. Route 52 Business in downtown Mount Airy. This is next door to the Mount Airy Visitor Center. After traveling for about one-quarter mile (0.40 km) along East Pine Street, the highway intersects NC 104 at the latter's southern terminus. The highway travels through the community (and census-designated place) of Flat Rock before it heads into a more rural and mountainous area. It curves around Slate Mountain and passes through the community of the same name before reaching the Virginia state line. NC 103 continues into Virginia as SR 103 near Claudville.

== History ==
The first NC 103 was today's NC 119, running mostly in Alamance and Caswell counties. It was decommissioned in 1940 and the current 103 was formed.

This was a result of Virginia's renumbering: NC 103 would supplement SR 103. There have been no other major changes made.

== Major intersections ==
The entire route is in Surry County.

Location	mi	km	Destinations	Notes
Mount Airy	0.0	0.0	US 52 Bus. / NC 89 (Renfro Street) / West Pine Street	Southern terminus
Mount Airy	0.2	0.32	NC 104 north (Riverside Drive) – Ararat	Southern terminus of NC 104
	8.5	13.7	SR 103 east (Claudville Highway) – Claudville	Northern terminus; Virginia state line
1.000 mi = 1.609 km; 1.000 km = 0.621 mi
