= Arthur C. Needles =

American railroad executive (1867–1936)

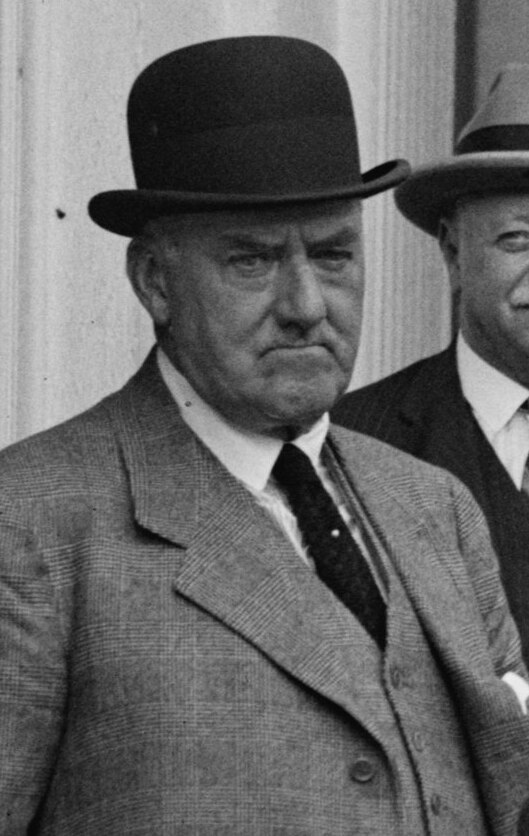
- Photo of Needles in 1926
- Born: Arthur Chase Needles; January 10, 1867; Baltimore, Maryland, U.S.
- Died: October 26, 1936 (aged 69); Roanoke, Virginia, U.S.
- Resting place: Green Mount Cemetery
- Education: Swarthmore College
- Occupation: Railroad executive
- Known for: president of Norfolk and Western Railroad
- Spouse(s): Bessie Parker Williams (m. 1899; died 1923) Hortense Edith Clarke (m. 1928)
- Children: 2

Arthur Chase Needles (January 10, 1867, in Baltimore, Maryland – October 26, 1936, in Roanoke, Virginia) was the president of the Norfolk and Western Railroad. He was president of the railroad that had 20,000 employees across the nation, and guided the company successfully through the opening years of the Great Depression.

== Early life and education ==
Needles was born in Baltimore, Maryland, and attended preparatory school at Swarthmore College.

== Personal life ==
He was married in 1899 to Bessie Parker Williams of Baltimore. They had a son, John Oliver Needles. Bessie Needles died in 1923.

His only daughter, Phoebe Augusta Needles (1906–1913), died at the age of 6 from meningitis. "He became interested through an Episcopal minister to underprivileged children in Franklin County, Virginia, and established there the St. Phoebe's Mission, in honor of his daughter, who died as a child. For the last sixteen years of his life he virtually supported the mission, although he was himself of the Quaker faith."

In 1928 he married Hortense Edith Clarke of New York.

== Railroad career ==
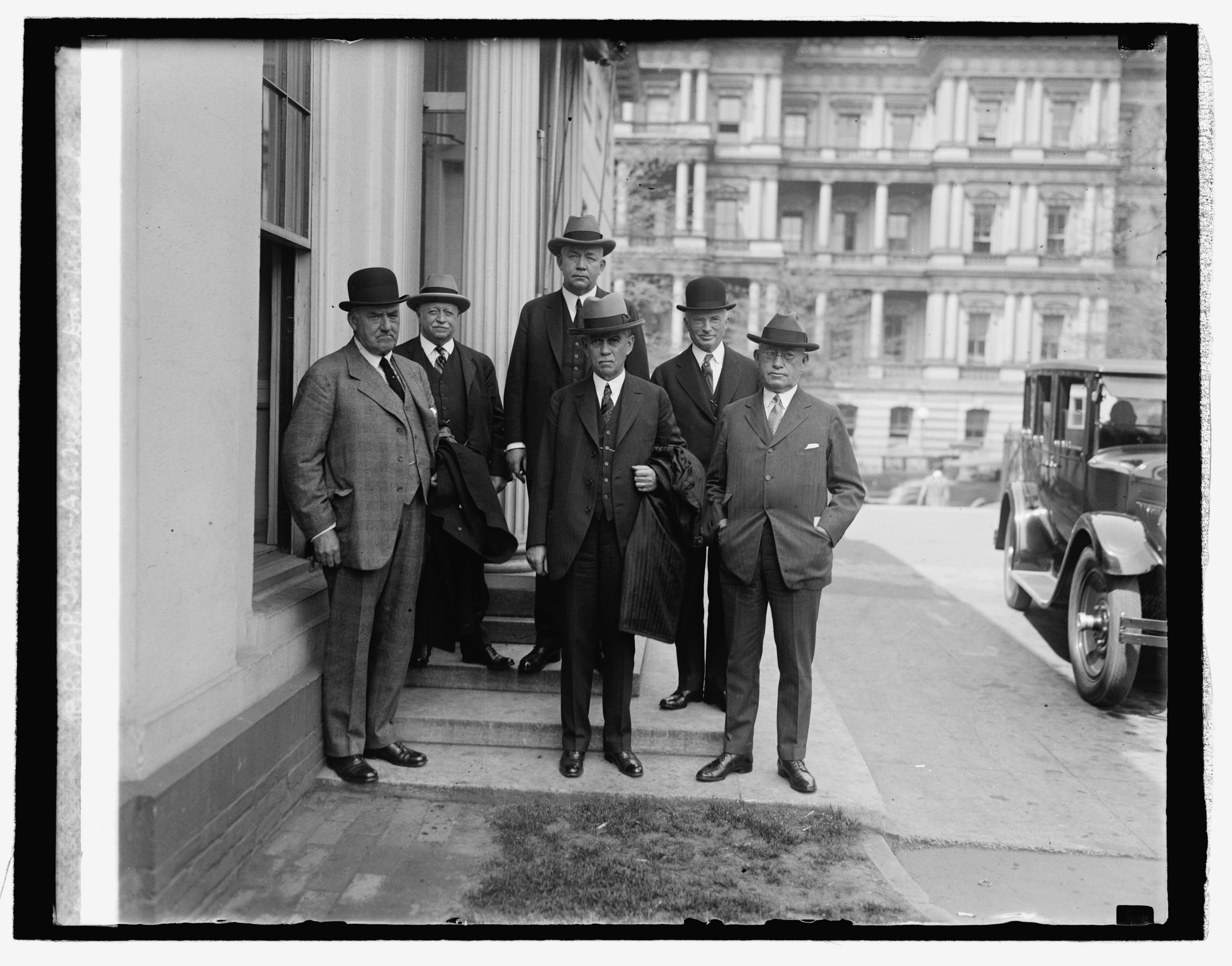
Needles (front left) with other railroad executives

Needles began work at age 16 in 1882 as a rodman with the Washington, Ohio and Western Railroad. Joining the Norfolk and Western in 1883, he worked sixteen hours a day when needed as both a brakeman and yard clerk. In 1884, he was promoted to night yard clerk, and in 1887 he was promoted to yardmaster of the Radford, Virginia Division of the railroad, and for the Pocahontas Division until 1890. He was made train master of the Pocahontas Division, and the supervisor of the Clinch Valley Line. Within a few years, he was promoted to superintendent, then vice-president of the Shenandoah Division. During World War I, the federal government took over the control of the railroads, and he was made the Federal Manager under the United States Railroad Administration from June 1, 1918, to March 1, 1920, when the railroads were returned to private ownership.

== Railroad president ==
Arthur C. Needles was the president of the Norfolk and Western railroad from 1924 to 1936. As president he worked to increase the safety of the railroad, both for employees and the public. He accepted the E. H. Harriman Award for railroad safety in 1926. He was responsible for turning many of the tracks into double tracks to promote both safety and efficiency. He also increased electrical transport of many of the coal trains operated by the company.

He was also the president of the Pocahontas Coal and Coke Company, and director of: Winston-Salem Southbound Railway Company; Norfolk and Portsmouth Belt Line Railroad; Fruit Growers Express Company; Mutual Fire, Marine and Inland Insurance Company; First National Exchange; Bank of Roanoke; Norfolk Terminal Authority.

== Death and burial ==
After a short illness, he died unexpectedly of heart problems in 1936. Although a Quaker, he funeral was observed at St. John's Episcopal Church in Roanoke. Afterwards, a special train carried his body to Baltimore for interment at the family lots at Green Mount Cemetery.

== Bibliography ==
- 1913. "Needles, Arthur C.". Biographical Directory of the Railway Officials of America. 7.
- 1936. "A.C Needles, Head of N&W., Dies After 53 Years of Service." Richmond Times-Dispatch. October 26, 1936.
- 1936. "Final Rites Will Be Held Today for A. C. Needles." Roanoke Times. October 27, 1936.
- 1936. "Leading Executives, Others, Pay Tribute; Business Will Halt." Roanoke World-News. October 26, 1936.
- 1936. "Needles Began Work as a Youth." Roanoke World-News. October 26, 1936.
- 1936. "Arthur Chase Needles. 1867-1936." Supplement to the Norfolk and Western Magazine. November 1936.
