= Redwood, Virginia =

Unincorporated community in Virginia, United States

- Unincorporated community
- Location within Virginia Location within the United States
- Coordinates: 37°01′12″N 79°48′43″W
- Country: United States
- State: Virginia
- County: Franklin
- Elevation: 1,158 ft (353 m)
- Time zone: UTC-5 (Eastern (EST))
  - Summer (DST): UTC-4 (EDT)
- ZIP code: 24146
- Area code: 540
- GNIS feature ID: 1473083

Redwood is an unincorporated community in Franklin County, Virginia, United States. Redwood is located on Virginia State Route 40, 4.7 miles (7.6 km) east-northeast of Rocky Mount. Redwood has a post office with ZIP code 24146, which opened on August 9, 1880.
