= North Carolina Highway 104 =

State highway in Surry County, North Carolina, US

North Carolina Highway 104
- Riverside Drive

Route information
- Maintained by NCDOT
- Length: 4.8 mi (7.7 km)
- Existed: 1940–present

Major junctions
- South end: NC 103 in Mount Airy
- North end: SR 773 at the Virginia state line near Mount Airy

Location
- Country: United States
- State: North Carolina
- Counties: Surry

Highway system
- North Carolina Highway System; Interstate; US; State; Scenic
← NC 103	→ NC 105

North Carolina Highway 104 (NC 104) is a primary state highway in the U.S. state of North Carolina. It connects northeast Surry County with downtown Mount Airy following Riverside Drive.

== Route description ==
NC 104 begins at NC 103 in downtown Mount Airy (also known as Pine Street) and immediately heads north along Riverside Drive. The road passes Riverside Park very close to the southern terminus of the route. NC 104 exits Mount Airy and crosses the Ararat River (after closely paralleling it for the rest of its route) before ending at the Virginia state line. The road continues northeast as Ararat Highway (State Route 773) towards Ararat, Virginia.

== History ==
NC 104 appears on the 1924 North Carolina State Map running from NC 10 in Garden City to NC 69 in Micaville. In 1925 NC 104 was truncated to the current US 70-NC 80 junction. In 1930 the road was extended along US 19E then was routed to Loafers Glory. In 1940 NC 104 was renumbered as NC 80.

In 1940 NC 104 was re-introduced as a renumbering of NC 800. The route ran from US 52 to Virginia State Route 104 (now secondary SR 773) at the state border. Between 1954 and 1957 NC 104 was rerouted to its current southern terminus at NC 103.

== Major intersections ==
The entire route is in Surry County.

Location	mi	km	Destinations	Notes
Mount Airy	0.0	0.0	NC 103 (East Pine Street)	Southern terminus
	4.8	7.7	SR 773 – Ararat	Northern terminus; Virginia state line
1.000 mi = 1.609 km; 1.000 km = 0.621 mi
