= Virginia State Route 177 =

State highway in Virginia, United States

State Route 177

Route information
- Maintained by VDOT
- Length: 4.41 mi (7.10 km)
- Existed: 1962–present

Major junctions
- South end: I-81 / SR 600 near Radford
- North end: US 11 in Radford

Location
- Country: United States
- State: Virginia
- Counties: Montgomery, City of Radford

Highway system
- Virginia Routes; Interstate; US; Primary; Secondary; Byways; History; HOT lanes
← SR 176	→ SR 178

State Route 177 (SR 177) is a primary state highway in the U.S. state of Virginia. The state highway runs 4.41 miles (7.10 km) from Interstate 81 (I-81) near Radford north to U.S. Route 11 (US 11) in Radford. SR 177 directly connects I-81 with the eastern part of the independent city of Radford, including Radford University.

== Route description ==
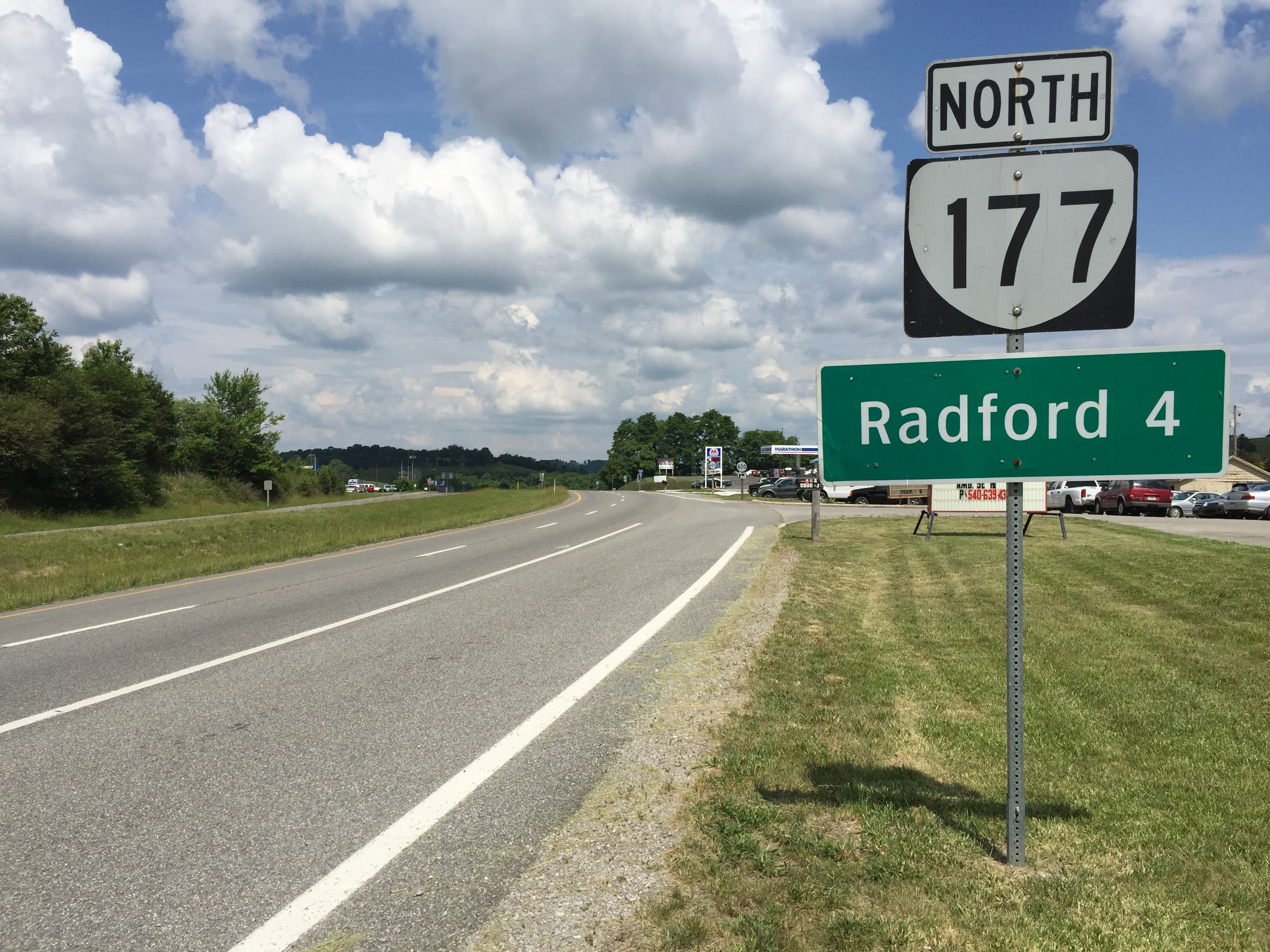
View north along SR 177 just north of I-81 and SR 600 near Radford

SR 177 begins at a diamond interchange with I-81 southeast of Radford. The road continues south as SR 600 (Tyler Road) past Carilion New River Valley Medical Center. SR 177 heads northwest as Tyler Road, a four-lane divided highway. The state highway enters the city of Radford at its intersection with Rock Road. SR 177 continues as Tyler Avenue through the eastern part of the city. The state highway becomes a two-lane divided highway at the southern edge of the campus of Radford University. SR 177 follows the western edge of the university before reaching its northern terminus at US 11 (Main Street).

== Major intersections ==
County	Location	mi	km	Destinations	Notes
Montgomery		0.00	0.00	I-81 / SR 600 south (Tyler Road) – Roanoke, Bristol, Childress	Exit 109 (I-81); southern terminus
Montgomery				SR 600 (Mud Pike)	former SR 110 south
City of Radford				SR 611 (Rock Road East)	former SR 102
City of Radford		4.41	7.10	US 11 (East Main Street)	Northern terminus
1.000 mi = 1.609 km; 1.000 km = 0.621 mi
