= Endicott, Virginia =

Unincorporated community in Virginia, United States

Coordinates: 36°53′15″N 80°08′59″W

Endicott, Virginia (GNIS FID: 1477306) is a small community in Franklin County, Virginia. Also known as "Long Branch, Virginia". There are only a few buildings left in the community. The elevation of Endicott is 1,158 feet. Endicott appears on the Endicott U.S. Geological Survey Map. Franklin County is in the Eastern Time Zone (UTC -5 hours).

== History ==
Located along Virginia State Route 40, Endicott was first settled in 1747. The origin of the name is that an early settler, Georgie Radford, and Mose, an escaped slave, first came upon the area when the milk weed was blossoming. Mose thought the milk weed was cotton, and said they were "In the cotton." Georgie Radford later inscribed a rock with the words "En de cott", which later became the town's name.

When Georgie Radford's father died in 1775, the 16 year old was able to save a land grant for 500 acres that his father had received for service during the French and Indian War from his creditors. The grant had been written on deerskin, and allowed him the land on the crest of the Blue Ridge Mountains. "The land grant was recorded on a strip of deerskin. It stated that 500 acres of land was his, located on the southerly slope beginning at the crest of the Blue Ridge. The boundary was in the form of a square and the south boundary was 36 degrees and twenty minutes latitude."

The Episcopal Diocese of Southwestern Virginia operated a mission school and church, St. John-of-the-Mountain, here from 1907-1943. They were organized by the Rev. William T. Roberts, who also organized and established the Phoebe Needles Mission School nearby.

Before World War II, Endicott had several general stores, a mill, two schools, a post office and was a voting precinct. However, since that time the town has lost population, and now has only a couple of churches still being used. The voting precinct was closed in 1997.

== Bibliography ==
- Fisher, Gayle, Harry Lewis Francis, and Herman E. Fisher. St. John's Church Cemetery Endicott Franklin County Virginia. Photography by Gayle Fisher and Harry Lewis Francis, with the Assistance of Herman E. Fisher. [Place of publication not identified]: Gayle Fisher, 2003.
- Harrison, Ora. "The Mission House in Endicott, Virginia; Among the Virginia Mountains." The Spirit of Missions, Volume 86. Episcopal Church. Board of Missions, Episcopal Church. Domestic and Foreign Missionary Society. J. L. Powell, 1921. Page 454-456.
- Merchant, Becky Cannaday. Over in the Country: A Blue Ridge Mountain Family's Stories. Buena Vista, Va: Mariner Pub, 2008. Subjects: Endicott Region (Va.)- Social life and customs- 20th century- Anecdotes; Endicott Region (Va.)- Biography- Anecdotes; Farm life- Virginia- Endicott Region- Anecdotes.
- Renick, Van T. Franklin County, Va. Parish Records, 1858-1998: Including Ascension, Emmanuel, St. John's, St. Peter's, and Trinity. Rocky Mount, Va: V.T. Renick, 1998.
- Thomas, Max S. Walnut Knob: A Story of Mountain Life and My Heritage in Song. Radford, Va: Commonwealth Press, 1977.
- Thompson, Charles D. Sister Ora, Brother Goode. 2004.
