= Lawless (2012 film) =

2012 American crime drama film

- Theatrical release poster
- Directed by: John Hillcoat
- Written by: Nick Cave
- Based on: The Wettest County in the World by Matt Bondurant
- Produced by: Lucy Fisher; Douglas Wick; Megan Ellison; Michael Benaroya
- Starring: Shia LaBeouf; Tom Hardy; Gary Oldman; Mia Wasikowska; Jessica Chastain; Jason Clarke; Guy Pearce
- Cinematography: Benoît Delhomme
- Edited by: Dylan Tichenor
- Music by: Nick Cave; Warren Ellis
- Production companies: FilmNation Entertainment; Benaroya Pictures; Red Wagon Entertainment; Annapurna Pictures; Revolt Films; BlumHansonAllen Films
- Distributed by: The Weinstein Company
- Release dates: May 19, 2012 (Cannes); August 29, 2012 (United States)
- Running time: 115 minutes
- Country: United States
- Language: English
- Budget: $26 million
- Box office: $54.4 million

Lawless is a 2012 American Southern Gothic gangster film directed by John Hillcoat and written by Nick Cave, who based his screenplay from Matt Bondurant's historical novel The Wettest County in the World. The film stars Shia LaBeouf, Tom Hardy, Gary Oldman, Mia Wasikowska, Jessica Chastain, Jason Clarke, and Guy Pearce.

Set during the Prohibition era in the Appalachian countryside of Southwest Virginia, the film focuses on the violent conflict between three bootlegging brothers: Forrest (Hardy), Howard (Clarke), and Jack Bondurant (LaBeouf) — and the corrupt and ruthless lawman Charlie Rakes (Pearce), who tries to shut down the brothers' illegal moonshine operation after Forrest refuses to pay him off. The film was in development for about three years before being produced. It screened at the 2012 Cannes Film Festival and was theatrically released on August 29, 2012 by The Weinstein Company. The film received positive reviews from critics and grossed $54.4 million against a $26 million budget.

== Plot ==
In 1931, the Bondurant brothers — middle brother, Forrest, eldest brother, Howard, and youngest brother, Jack — are running a successful moonshine business in Franklin County, Virginia. The brothers use their gas station and restaurant as a front for dealing, with the assistance of Cricket, Jack's mechanically gifted friend, who builds and maintains their stills. Jack witnesses rum-runner, Floyd Banner, fatally shoot two federal agents in broad daylight for trying to arrest him.

Forrest hires Maggie, a financially struggling dancer, as a waitress. Shortly afterward, the gas station is visited by newly appointed U.S. Marshal Charley Rakes, accompanied by the sheriff and corrupt state's attorney, Mason Wardell. Rakes demands that he and Wardell receive a cut of profits from all bootleggers in the county, including Forrest, in exchange for ignoring their operations. Forrest stands his ground, and implores his fellow bootleggers to unite against Rakes, but they refuse.

Meanwhile, Jack lusts after Bertha, daughter of the local Brethren preacher. He attends their church service drunk, embarrassing himself but piquing her interest. Jack walks in on a visit from Rakes to Cricket's house, and is beaten by him, as a message to his brothers. Later that night, Forrest throws out two drunk customers who had been harassing and threatening Maggie. After Maggie leaves, Forrest is ambushed by the two men, who slit his throat. Maggie returns looking for Forrest but is beaten and raped by the men. She hides the assault from Forrest, not wanting him to take revenge.

While Forrest recovers at a hospital, Jack, deciding to retire from bootlegging rather than cross Rakes any further, crosses the county line with Cricket to sell their remaining liquor. They are ambushed by Banner and his crew, but are spared when Jack reveals he is a Bondurant, whom Banner admires for their stance against Rakes. Banner confesses to Jack the address of his brother's assailants, revealing that both men are former bootleggers who escaped punishment for their crimes by working as deputy marshals for Rakes.

Forrest and Howard find, torture, and kill the men, and send one of their testicles to Rakes. Banner becomes a regular client of the brothers, who invest their profits into setting up larger stills deep in the woods. Jack continues to court Bertha. Maggie decides to return to Chicago, but Forrest convinces her to stay and provides her with a spare room; they soon develop a romantic relationship. On a day trip, Jack decides to show Bertha the brothers' secret operation, but they are followed and ambushed by Rakes and his officers. Howard and Jack flee but Cricket and Bertha are caught. The police take Bertha home, while Cricket has his neck snapped by Rakes.

After Cricket's funeral, the sheriff warns the Bondurants that Rakes has set up a blockade at the bridge to trap them while Wardell arranges for Prohibition agents to round up every bootlegger in the county. Jack speeds off in Cricket's car to confront Rakes. Howard and Forrest quickly follow to provide backup, to Maggie's chagrin. She reveals she had delivered him to the hospital after the attack and Forrest realizes that she had been raped.

Jack arrives at the bridge but is wounded by Rakes. Howard and Forrest arrive, and a shootout ensues, during which Forrest and his driver are also wounded, the latter fatally. A convoy of bootleggers arrive and hold the lawmen at gunpoint. Rakes ignores them and attempts to execute Forrest but is shot in the leg by the sheriff in an attempt to halt the bloodshed. Rakes turns to leave the scene, but suddenly turns around and shoots Forrest several times. The convoy opens fire on Rakes, but he runs into a covered bridge. Since he is unable to run far, the badly wounded Jack and Howard follow and Howard plunges a knife into Rakes' back, killing him.

Following the end of Prohibition in 1933, Wardell is arrested on corruption charges while the Bondurants are all married — Jack to Bertha, Forrest to Maggie, and Howard to a Martinsville woman — and working in legitimate occupations. During a festive reunion at Jack's house sometime later, Forrest drunkenly ambles to a frozen lake and falls into the freezing water. Although he drags himself out, he later dies of pneumonia, putting to rest the legend of his invincibility.

== Cast ==
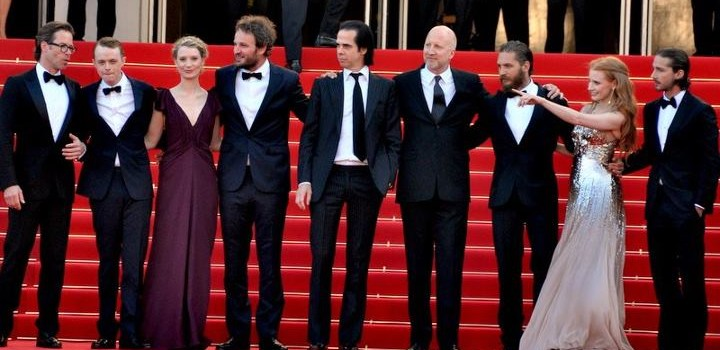
From left: Pearce, DeHaan, Wasikowska, Clarke, Cave, Hillcoat, Hardy, Chastain, and LaBeouf at the film's 2012 Cannes Film Festival screening

- Shia LaBeouf as Jack Bondurant
- Tom Hardy as Forrest Bondurant
- Jason Clarke as Howard Bondurant
- Jessica Chastain as Maggie Beauford
- Guy Pearce as Special Deputy Charlie Rakes
- Gary Oldman as Floyd Banner
- Mia Wasikowska as Bertha Minnix
- Dane DeHaan as Cricket Pate
- Chris McGarry as Danny
- Tim Tolin as Mason Wardell
- Lew Temple as Deputy Henry Abshire
- Marcus Hester as Deputy Jeff Richards
- Bill Camp as Sheriff Hodges
- Alex Van as Tizwell Minnix
- Noah Taylor as "Gummy" Walsh

== Production ==
In 2008, writer Matt Bondurant wrote the historical novel The Wettest County in the World, based on the Prohibition-era moonshine bootlegging activities of his grandfather Jack Bondurant and grand-uncles Forrest and Howard. Producers Douglas Wick and Lucy Fisher optioned the book in 2008 and sent it to director John Hillcoat. Hillcoat later said,

[Bootlegging] sort of drew [the Bondurants] into this crazy kind of world of corruption and lawlessness ironically, but then mostly they survived, they got through it all and actually went on to have businesses and children. And traditionally the gangster film teaches us that we've got to pay for our sins. Usually the gangster is shot down in a blaze of glory and doesn't get up again.

Hillcoat and screenwriter Nick Cave, who had worked together on the Western film The Proposition (2005), were attracted to the story by the success of the Bondurants. Hillcoat also said, "we also loved the idea that it sort of touched on the whole immortality that a lot of these guys start to feel when they do survive so many strange experiences."

The first actor to be cast was Shia LaBeouf as Jack, the youngest Bondurant brother. James Franco was attached to play Howard and Ryan Gosling was attached to play Forrest; Amy Adams and Scarlett Johansson were also attached to the project. Originally titled The Wettest County in The World, the same as the novel, the film's title was changed to The Promised Land.

Although Hillcoat intended to begin shooting in February 2010, in January the project was reported to have fallen apart due to financing problems. Only LaBeouf remained with the project. He said that after he saw Bronson (2008), "I went home and wrote Tom [Hardy] a letter saying I was a fan. He sent me a script, and I sent him Lawless. He called me back and said, 'This is fucking amazing.'" Cinematographer Benoît Delhomme recommended Jessica Chastain to Hillcoat. Chastain said, "I am a big fan of The Proposition. I hadn't even read the script, but I told [Hillcoat], 'If you cast me, I'll do it.' I approach every role in terms of: 'Have I done this before? Is it something I'm repeating?' Lawless offered a new opportunity."

By December 2010, Hardy and Chastain were reported to have joined the project. Michael Benaroya of Benaroya Pictures and Megan Ellison of Annapurna Pictures were undertaking its financing. Jason Clarke and Dane DeHaan were cast in January 2011. Guy Pearce, Gary Oldman, and Mia Wasikowska joined the cast in February 2011.

According to Cave, "a lot of the truly brutal stuff did not make it through into the film. In the book, you get lulled by the beautiful lyricism of the writing, then suddenly you are slapped in the face by a graphic description of a killing. I tried to be true to that as much as I could." He also said the filmmakers "tried to stay as true to the original story as possible", adding "we kind of changed aspects of the personality and temperament of Rakes to get [Pearce] involved."

Before Pearce was cast, "Rakes, the character Rakes, was very much like the character in the book. He was a nasty country cop. We made him a city cop, gave him his disturbed sexuality and all the rest of it," Cave said. Pearce created the hairstyle worn by Rakes in the film.

Lawless was filmed early 2011 in various locations near Atlanta, Georgia, including Newnan, Grantville, Haralson, LaGrange, Carroll County's McIntosh Park, and the Red Oak Creek Covered Bridge south of Gay. The cast lived in apartments in Peachtree City for three months during production, and Hillcoat screened dailies for the cast every weekend. Hillcoat and Delhomme consulted with cinematographers Roger Deakins and Harris Savides on digital cinematography. They chose to use the Arri Alexa digital camera system for Lawless, and Delhomme always used two cameras during filming.

In March 2011, Momentum Pictures and its parent company Alliance Films acquired the U.K. and Canadian distribution rights. In May 2011, the Weinstein Company bought the U.S. distribution rights, with plans for a wide release. In March 2012, the title was changed to Lawless.

== Music ==
Cave scored the film with Warren Ellis. Cave said

What we didn't want to do is do an Americana soundtrack in the sense that we didn't want to do the kind of top-shelf. ... We wanted to make this music ourselves. And what I mean by "ourselves" is we actually play it—me and Warren and a couple of musicians that we know, even though we don't know anything about bluegrass music or our bluegrass chops are pretty limited. And in that way we could get something that was very raw and brutal and punky, and that's what we were really aiming at rather than doing something that was more respectful of the genre. We were determined to take these songs and do them in our own way.

A soundtrack for the film was released on August 28, 2012:

== Release ==
Lawless screened In Competition at the 2012 Cannes Film Festival on May 19 and received a nearly 10-minute standing ovation. The film was theatrically released in the U.S. on Wednesday, August 29, 2012. The Weinstein Company hoped that good word of mouth would be built up for the upcoming Labor Day weekend.

== Reception ==
=== Critical response ===
On Rotten Tomatoes, the film has an approval rating of 67% based on 218 reviews, with an average rating of 6.47/10. The site's critical consensus reads, "Grim, bloody, and utterly flawed, Lawless doesn't quite achieve the epic status it strains for, but it's too beautifully filmed and powerfully acted to dismiss." On Metacritic, the film has a weighted average score of 58 out of 100, based on reviews from 38 critics, indicating "mixed or average" reviews. Audiences polled by the market research firm CinemaScore gave Lawless a B+ grade on average.

==== Cannes ====
David Rooney of The Hollywood Reporter wrote:

"If Lawless doesn't achieve the mythic dimensions of the truly great outlaw and gangster movies, it is a highly entertaining tale set in a vivid milieu, told with style and populated by a terrific ensemble. For those of us who are suckers for blood-soaked American crime sagas from that era, those merits will be plenty."

Mike D'Angelo of The A.V. Club gave the film a B− grade, calling it "a thoroughly familiar—but flavorful and rousing—shoot-'em-up set among Prohibition bootleggers. ... If you've seen even a handful of Tommy-gun movies, however, everything that happens here will feel preordained". Richard Corliss of Time magazine wrote: "much of the picture has a fossilized feeling; it could be a diorama under glass at the Museum of Nasty People. As a serious film worthy of the Cannes Competition, Lawless tries to be flawless; as a movie, it's often listless—lifeless."

==== After theatrical release ====
Peter Bradshaw of The Guardian gave the film 2 stars out of 5, writing:

"it's basically a smug, empty exercise in macho-sentimental violence in which we are apparently expected to root for the lovable good ol' boys, as they mumble, shoot, punch and stab. Our heroes manage to ensnare the affections of preposterously exquisite young women, and the final flurry of self-adoring nostalgia is borderline-nauseating."

Owen Gleiberman of Entertainment Weekly gave Lawless a B grade, writing: "Hardy's presence is compelling, but the film comes fully alive only when it turns bloody. At those moments, though, it has the kick of a mule." Mick LaSalle of the San Francisco Chronicle also praised Hardy's performance, and concluded, "The filmmakers detail a long-gone conflict from a long-lost era and end up showing how the dreams and longings that motivate Americans never really change." Peter Travers of Rolling Stone gave the film 2.5 stars out of 4, writing: "Lawless is a solid outlaw adventure, but you can feel it straining for a greatness that stays out of reach. There's even a prologue and an epilogue, arty tropes signifying an attempt to make a Godfather-style epic out of these moonshine wars. Not happening." Roger Ebert of the Chicago Sun-Times also gave the film 2.5 stars out of 4, writing:

I can only admire this film's craftsmanship and acting, and regret its failure to rise above them. Its characters live by a barbaric code that countenances murder. They live or die in a relentless hail of gunfire. It's not so much that the movie is too long, as that too many people must be killed before it can end.

Claudia Puig of USA Today gave the film 2 stars out of 4, writing: "The unflinching slicing and dicing is viscerally brutal, but without sufficient character development Lawless simply feels lifeless." David Edelstein of New York magazine wrote: "The mixture of arthouse pacing and shocking gore seems to convince a lot of people that they're seeing a mythic depiction of the outlaw way of existence. I saw a standard revenge picture played at half-speed." Robert Abele of the Los Angeles Times felt that the film was clichéd, writing that it "turns the Virginia hills of the early 1930s into just another backdrop for a clockwork succession of perfunctorily filmed showdowns and shootouts." A. O. Scott of The New York Times similarly wrote:

There are too many action-movie clichés without enough dramatic purpose, and interesting themes and anecdotes are scattered around without being fully explored. This is weak and cloudy moonshine: it doesn't burn or intoxicate.

=== Accolades ===
Award	Category	Recipients	Result
65th Cannes Film Festival	Palme d'Or	John Hillcoat	Nominated
Georgia Film Critics Association	Best Original Song	"Cosmonaut" by Nick Cave & Warren Ellis	Nominated
Georgia Film Critics Association	Best Original Song	"Fire in the Blood" by Nick Cave & Warren Ellis	Nominated
Georgia Film Critics Association	Oglethorpe Award for Excellence in Georgia Cinema	Nick Cave & John Hillcoat	Nominated

== See also ==
- The Great Moonshine Conspiracy Trial of 1935
