= The Great Moonshine Conspiracy Trial of 1935 =

Historic fraud court case in Virginia, USA

The Great Moonshine Conspiracy Trial of 1935 resulted in the indictment of 80 people involved in the illegal production and distribution of moonshine whisky in Virginia. At the time, Franklin County was believed to produce the highest volume of illegal liquor in the U.S., colloquially referred to as "the moonshine capital of the world." From 1928-1935, prosecutors alleged that a conspiracy ring had defrauded the government out of 5.5 million dollars in whisky excise taxes, equivalent to roughly 95 million dollars today. The case is the second longest in Virginia’s history and eventually resulted in 20 convictions, including several officers of the law and government officials.

== Description ==
The alleged conspiracy was uncovered by federal agent Colonel Thomas Bailey, who after distinguishing himself as a hero in World War I, became an undercover agent for the federal government. Posing as a small-scale moonshine buyer, Bailey went undercover in Franklin County beginning in 1934. Unlike previous attempts to curtail illegal liquor production, Bailey's plan sought to protect rather than arrest the small distillers in exchange for incriminating information that could lead to the arrest of the conspiracy's ringleaders. After roughly a year, Bailey was allegedly able to uncover a complex system driven by bribery and extortion, in which distillers would supposedly pay local sheriffs for protection from federal law enforcement agencies. In truth, however, the Governor of Virginia had directed law enforcement to take fines from whiskey makers wherever possible in order to relieve congestion in both the courts and jails in the Commonwealth. Bailey's case took roughly two years to build, and charged the defendants with 68 separate counts of illegal activity related to the production of untaxed moonshine whisky. The prosecution summoned 176 witnesses, most of which (if not all) were convicted criminals, versus the defense's 69, taking roughly 10 weeks for the entirety of the testimonies to be heard. In fact, many of the Government's witnesses likely had ulterior motives in testifying for the prosecution because they had been previously convicted by the efforts of some of the defendants.

After a grueling two-month trial, the verdict was finally made public on July 1, 1935. After an examination of the evidence, County Commonwealth's Attorney and grand-nephew of Robert E. Lee, Charles Carter Lee, along with two others, were acquitted with the other 30 defendants found guilty. Of the charges that were levied against the guilty parties, most were so light that many of them were back in business before they had even been sent to serve their jail time. The Great Moonshine Conspiracy Trial of 1935 resulted in little real effect on illegal liquor production in Franklin County, Virginia.

== Aftermaths ==
In the 1950s, the court files and official trial transcripts mysteriously disappeared. In the 1990s, the retired lawyer Keister Greer led a thorough investigation to understand where those might have gone.

== In popular culture ==
The 2012 movie Lawless is set in Franklin County and portrays similar corruption.

== Bibliography ==
- Keister Greer, The Great Moonshine Conspiracy Trial of 1935, History House Pr, 2003
