= The Wettest County in the World =

Novel

The Wettest County in the World: A Novel Based on a True Story
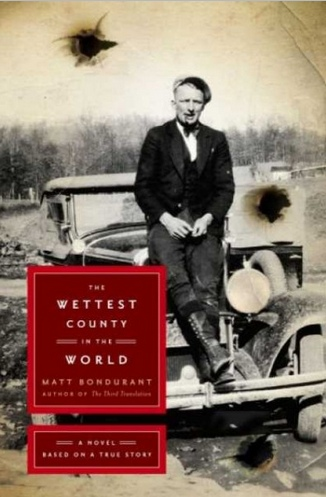
- Author: Matt Bondurant
- Language: English
- Genre: Historical novel, Crime novel
- Publisher: Scribner
- Publication date: October 14, 2008
- Publication place: United States
- Media type: Print (Hardback & Paperback)
- Pages: 320 pp (hardback edition)
- ISBN: 1-4165-6139-0 (hardback edition)

The Wettest County in the World is a 2008 historical novel by Matt Bondurant, an American writer who features his grandfather Jack and grand-uncles Forrest and Howard as the main characters in the novel.

The book tells of the trio during the Depression and Prohibition in rural Virginia, who made a living bootlegging moonshine. The novel is told from both the perspectives of the three Bondurant brothers, mainly focusing on the youngest, Jack, and of the writer Sherwood Anderson, who described Franklin County in that period as the "wettest county in the world" while working there as a journalist during Prohibition. The film Lawless (2012), directed by John Hillcoat, is based on the book with a screenplay by Nick Cave.

== Background ==
The novel, inspired by the author's paternal grandfather Jack and two grand-uncles, Forrest and Howard, all descendants of a French Huguenot refugee to Virginia, Jean Pierre Bondurant, focuses on the historical events of the Great Franklin County Moonshine Conspiracy, a series of events and a trial related to the illegal activities of the moonshiners in Franklin County. Sherwood Anderson was there working as a journalist at the time. To research the historical period, Bondurant listened to family stories and used archival records, news clippings and court transcripts. Locals began to think of the three brothers as "indestructible" because all of them survived.

In an essay, Bondurant said that he had illegal moonshine from Franklin County, despite having been raised in Alexandria, Virginia, a suburb of Washington, D.C. As a teenager, he first drank moonshine, and he knows his relatives in Franklin County drank moonshine at family events. Bondurant said he had difficulty getting information from people in Franklin when researching the novel. The illegal liquor-making in the county is a topic not often broached in public. He says that "you could spend years [in Franklin County] and never see [moonshine drinking], even as it is all around you."

== Style ==
The New York Times Book Review emphasized that the lyrical and lively style of the novel is in service to extremely grotesque subject matter with detail that "can leave a reader queasy." Similarly, Lauren Bufferd at BookPage.com warned readers that the novel is "extremely graphic, with multiple descriptions of physical injury, brutality and sadistic behavior."

The novel takes place on two different story lines: the first follows the Bondurant brothers during the 1920s and 1930s, while the second takes place in 1934 as Sherwood Anderson writes about their feats. The New York Times book reviewer, Louisa Thomas, suggests that this juxtaposition of chronologies works well in some situations but not in others, causing unnecessary complication for the reader.

== Reception ==
In The New York Times Book Review, Louisa Thomas noted that the "prose is lyrical" but had mixed feelings about the use of a broken narration as the fictional reporter Anderson investigates the "Bondurant boys". Ann H. Fisher of Library Journal called the book "a cracklingly good novel, with plenty of action and local color." She also noted that the book should be included in "regional collections" in Virginia. Reviewing the audiobook edition of the novel for Library Journal, Scott R. DiMarco called the story a "gripping, hauntingly told tale" and recommended that libraries purchase the audiobook.

== Film adaptation ==
The novel was optioned in 2006, but the project's initial financing was lost in early 2010. The project was revived later that year. A film adaptation of the book, entitled Lawless and directed by John Hillcoat, was released on 31 August 2012. The film stars Shia LaBeouf, Tom Hardy, and Jason Clarke as the three Bondurant brothers. Also in the film are Gary Oldman, Guy Pearce, Jessica Chastain, and Mia Wasikowska. The screenplay was written by Nick Cave, who earlier wrote the screenplay for Hillcoat's The Proposition (2005).
