= Virginia State Route 103 =

State highway in Patrick County, Virginia, US

State Route 103

Route information
- Maintained by VDOT
- Length: 13.43 mi (21.61 km)
- Existed: 1933–present

Major junctions
- West end: NC 103 near Claudville
- East end: SR 8 at Five Forks

Location
- Country: United States
- State: Virginia
- Counties: Patrick

Highway system
- Virginia Routes; Interstate; US; Primary; Secondary; Byways; History; HOT lanes
← SR 102	→ SR 105

State Route 103 (SR 103) is a primary state highway in the U.S. state of Virginia. The state highway runs 13.43 miles (21.61 km) from the North Carolina state line, where the highway continues as North Carolina Highway 103 (NC 103), east to SR 8 at Five Forks. In conjunction with NC 103 and SR 8, SR 103 connects Mount Airy, North Carolina with Stuart, the county seat of Patrick County.

== Route description ==
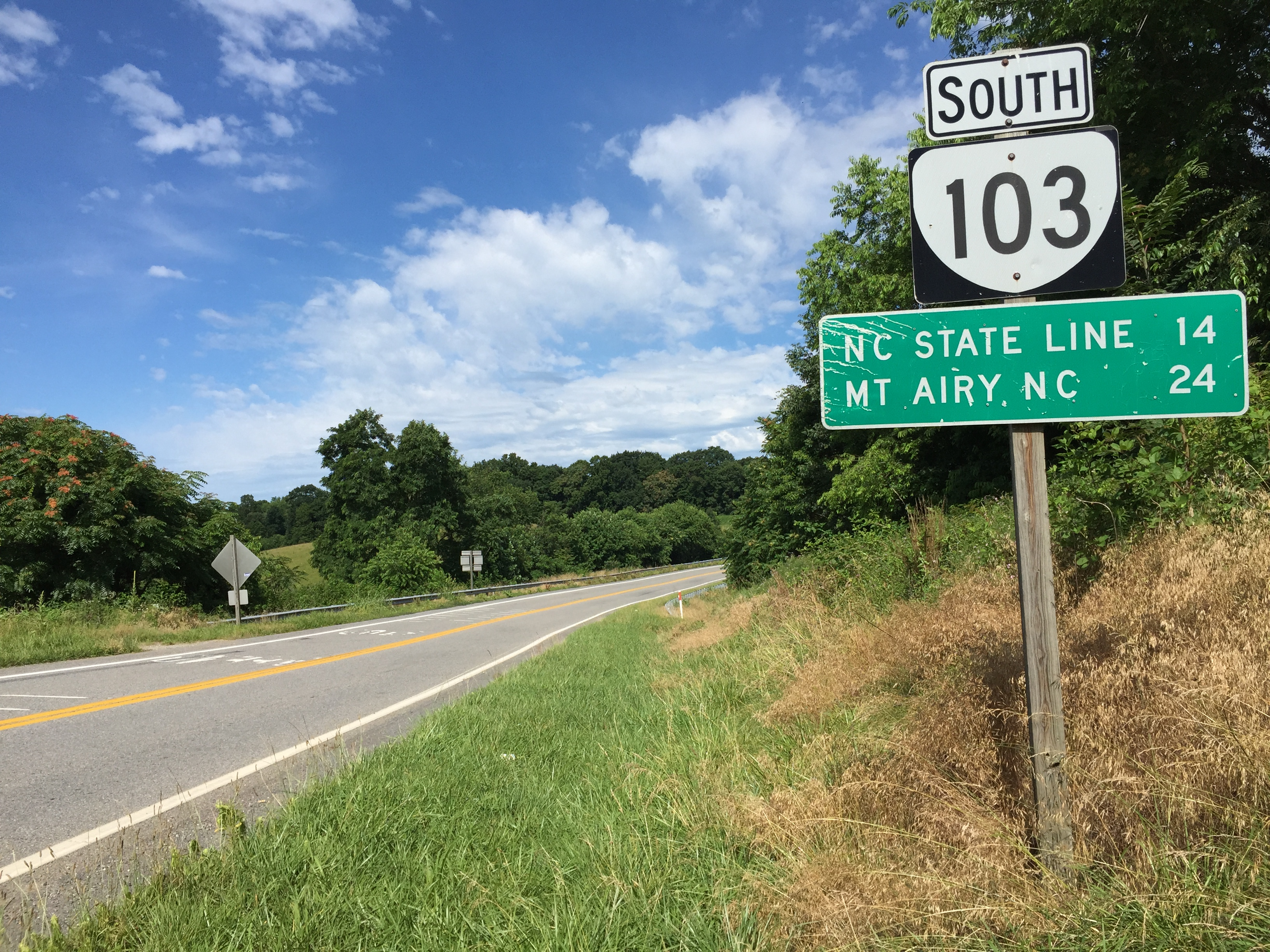
View south at the north end of SR 103 at SR 8 in Five Forks

SR 103 begins at the North Carolina state line southwest of Claudville. The highway continues southwest as NC 103 toward Slate Mountain, Flat Rock, and Mount Airy. SR 103 heads northeast as two-lane undivided Claudville Highway, which crosses the Dan River. In Claudville, the state highway intersects SR 773 (Ararat Highway), which heads west through the foothills to Ararat. SR 103 heads east out of Claudville as Dry Pond Highway. The state highway crosses the Little Dan River and passes through the hamlets of Dry Pond and Peters Creek before reaching its eastern terminus at SR 8 (Salem Highway) at Five Forks between Stuart and the North Carolina state line.

== Major intersections ==
The entire route is in Patrick County.

Location	mi	km	Destinations	Notes
	0.00	0.00	NC 103 west – Mt. Airy	North Carolina state line; western terminus
Claudville			SR 773 (Ararat Highway) – Ararat, J.E.B. Stuart Birthplace	former SR 104 west
	13.43	21.61	SR 8 (Salem Highway) – Stuart, Winston-Salem, NC	Eastern terminus
1.000 mi = 1.609 km; 1.000 km = 0.621 mi

< SR 219	District 2 State Routes; 1928–1933	SR 221 >
