= Callaway, Virginia =

Unincorporated community in Virginia, United States

- Unincorporated community
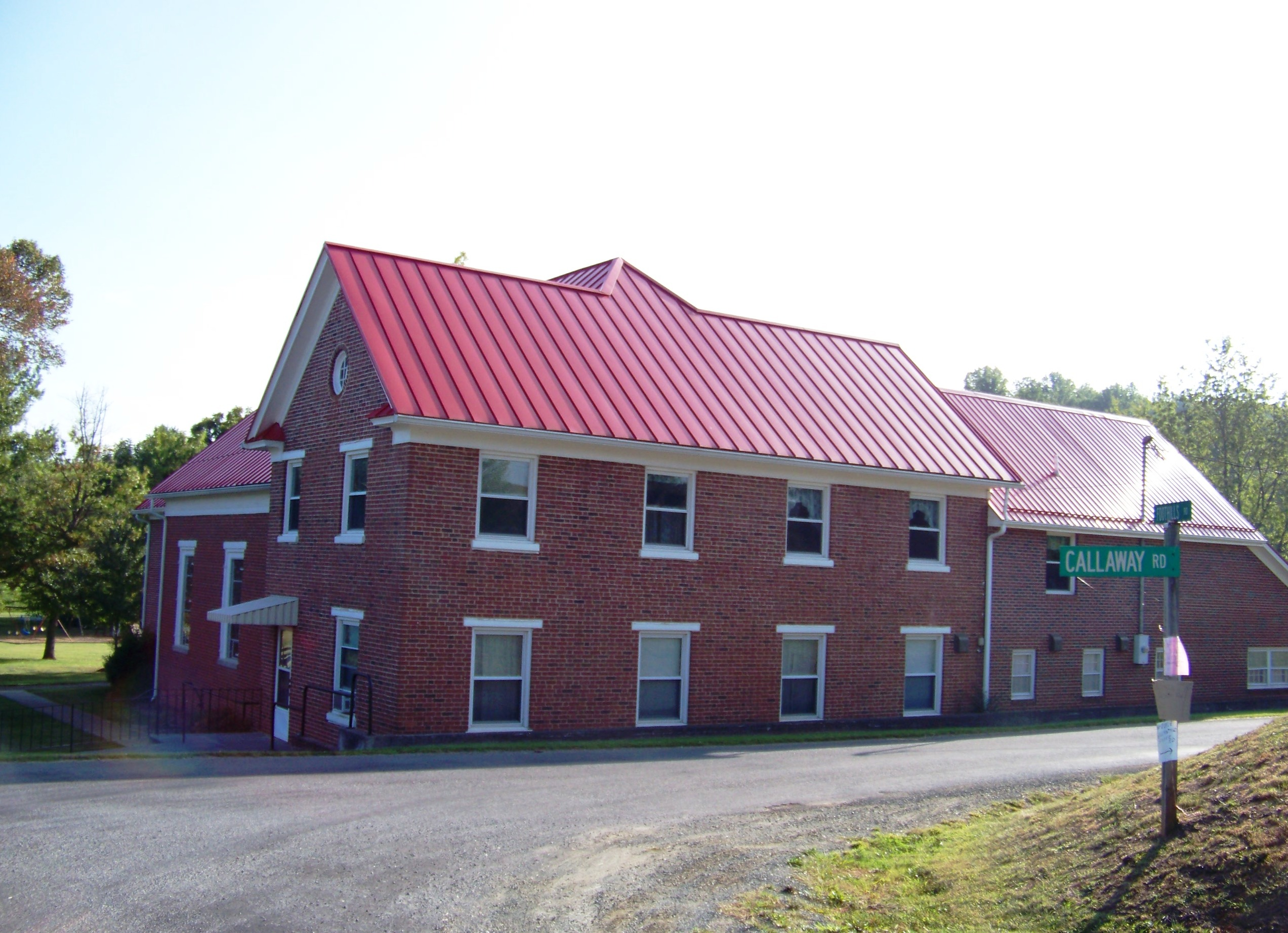
- Piedmont Presbyterian Church in Callaway

- Location within Virginia Location within the United States
- Coordinates: 37°00′41″N 80°02′58″W
- Country: United States
- State: Virginia
- County: Franklin
- Elevation: 1,204 ft (367 m)
- Time zone: UTC-5 (Eastern (EST))
  - Summer (DST): UTC-4 (EDT)
- ZIP code: 24067
- Area code: 540
- GNIS feature ID: 1492693

Callaway is an unincorporated community in Franklin County, Virginia, United States. Callaway is 8.8 miles (14.2 km) west of Rocky Mount. Callaway has a post office with ZIP code 24067, which opened on July 14, 1871.

Bleak Hill was listed on the National Register of Historic Places in 2002.

The Piedmont Presbyterian Church in Callaway is reported to be the first Presbyterian church erected in the county of Franklin County, Virginia. Constructed by Benjamin Deyerle about 1850, the Flemish bond Greek Revival church, has two front entrances, shuttered windows and a pedimented front gable. Reportedly, Benjamin Deyerle's slaves made the bricks on the nearby William Callaway farm and then laid the bricks for the church building.

About four miles outside of Callaway is the Phoebe Needles Mission School, an Episcopal mission school dating from 1907. Phoebe Augusta Needles was the only daughter of Arthur C. Needles, president of the Norfolk and Western Railway, who died at age 6. For many years, the school and buildings were financially supported for the underprivileged girls by Mr. Needles. The school and mission church used to serve the rural and mountain children of the county who could not get to the public schools in Callaway, Ferrum, Virginia or Rocky Mount, Virginia. The school has now become a church parish, Center for Lifelong Learning and summer camp operated by the Episcopal Diocese of Southwestern Virginia.
