= Phoebe Needles Mission School =

Defunct school

Coordinates: 36.967359°N 80.095595°W

The Phoebe Needles Mission School (1902-1943) was a noted Mission school operated by the Episcopal Diocese of Southwestern Virginia in Franklin County, Virginia, near the town of Callaway, Virginia, in the Blue Ridge Mountains. At the turn of the twentieth century, the Episcopal Church (United States) wanted to increase mission outreach to isolated communities within the Commonwealth. At Phoebe Needles, the Episcopal church established a small mission church, St Peter's-on-the-Mountains, and a school. The school provided free education to rural and mountain areas where the students could not go to the public schools. The Rev. William T. Roberts organized both the Episcopal mission at Phoebe Needles, as well as St. John-of-the-Mountain in Endicott, Virginia.

Geographic Name Information System GNIS ID: 1494484

== Mission School ==
The school site was selected because at that time the state school system had no method of public transport. There was a need for a school in the area with few roads and little transport, and the school system could not afford to operate another school outside of the local one in Callaway, about four miles away. The school building was constructed in 1907 along with a small wooden church, Emmanuel Church. Commencing with the first semester, Miss Caryetta "Etta" Davis took charge of the school as the missionary-in-charge. She would serve for over 30 years at the school. Originally it had forty students, and quarters were also constructed for the teachers on site.

In 1913, a terrible snow storm destroyed both the school and the church. A new facility was built between 1915 and 1917, that was built of stone from local quarries. This construction was almost entirely financed by Arthur C. Needles, who was at the time president of the Norfolk and Western Railroad, in honor of his daughter, Phoebe. Phoebe Needles had recently died at the age of six due to meningitis. The school provided for students in grades one through seven. Originally devised for mountain girls, it was later opened to both boys and girls.

The only daughter of Arthur and Bessie Needles, Phoebe Augusta Needles (1906-1913), died at the age of 6 from meningitis. "He became interested through an Episcopal minister to underprivileged children in Franklin County, Virginia, and established there the St. Phoebe's Mission, in honor of his daughter, who died as a child. For the last sixteen years of his life he virtually supported the mission, although he was himself of the Quaker faith."

"Caryetta Davis (known as Miss Etta), the daughter of an Episcopal priest, taught at the school for thirty years. Miss Etta was widely known and respected throughout the community. There were many other teachers who are well remembered for their substantial contributions to the people of this community: Agatha Saunders, Mamie Montgomery, M. Baker, Susie Saunders, Mary Saunders, Louisa Wood, Betty Clenearly, Nell Strayer Roberts, Alberta Booth, Octavia Ulma and Agatha Walker Pennybacker." Evidently Etta Davis was well beloved by the students. She had at least one child of one of her students named after her. "Etta Helm was named for Etta Davis, who a teacher at the Phoebe Needles Mission School. Etta is not a traditional Helms name."

From the original forty students, the school grew to have an average of between 100 and 150 students per semester. "This school was founded in 1906 by the Rev. W. T. Roberts and endowed by A. C Needles, then president of the Norfolk and Western Railway. It is known as the Phoebe Needles Memorial School. The average enrollment is from 100 to 150. The buildings consist of two large native stone structure, one is the church and the other the school building. The object of the school is to prepare girls of the mountains for worthy home life."

A report on the mission school was complimentary in 1928: "Southwestern Virginia- St. Phoebe’s Hall (Phoebe Needles Memorial School), St. Peter’s in the Mountains, Callaway, VA, (girls-boys) Diocesan, est. 1907. Grades: Elementary. Principal, Miss Mary Louise Wood; Chaplain, Rev. Allen Person. The Living Church Annual and Churchman’s Almanac. A Church Cyclopedia and Almanac. Milwaukee: Morehouse-Gorham Company. 1928. Page 105.

When the school closed in 1943, Miss Alberta Booth was an assistant to the missionary in charge, and Miss Mary Louise, was the missionary in charge at St. Peter’s in the Mountains.

In 2017, the mission school and church celebrated its 100th anniversary. “More than 100 years ago, a mission school for children who lived in the remote mountains of Franklin County was formed. It was one of many mission schools in the county at the time, and the only one left that is still in operation. The Phoebe Needles Center is no longer a mission school, of course, but the center will be a beehive of activity and learning for youth this summer as annual camps get under way. (Boothe, Charles. “The Phoebe Needles Center”, Franklin News-Posr. June 2, 2012.

Although the school was closed, the church parish continued, with the school building was used for a variety of purposes. It has been used for years as a retreat for priests and congregations in the diocese, as well as for special meetings and activities. "In 1917, Arthur Needles, then president of the Norfolk & Western Railway, donated the money to build Phoebe Needles Hall. It was named in memory of his 6-year-old daughter who died from meningitis. The building has served as a school, an Episcopal mission, and more recently as a summer camp and conference center."

== St. Peter's-on-the-Mountain ==
The Emmanuel mission church was originally constructed of wood, and was destroyed in a snow storm in 1914. The mission church was placed about 20 miles from Rocky Mount, Virginia The Rev. William T. Roberts was the minister at the mission and school. When the original wooden church was destroyed, it was re-built and re-consecrated as St. Peters-on-the-Mountain. As the church and Episcopal mission school, it is located in the Western portion of Franklin County, near the top of the Blue Ridge Mountains, and about 20 miles from Rocky Mount, Virginia. This school was founded in 1906 by the Rev. William T. Roberts and endowed by Arthur C. Needles, then president of the Norfolk and Western Railway. It is known as the Phoebe Needles Memorial School. The average enrollment is from 100 to 150. The buildings consist of two large native stone structure, one is the church and the other the school building. The object of the school is to prepare girls of the mountains for worthy home life. Wingfield, Marshall. Franklin County, a History. Reprint, 2009, Genealogical Printing Company. Page 89.

Located near Floyd County, Virginia and Henry County, Virginia, the 85 acres of grounds and the facilities of the church have been used for a wide number of parish and public outreach services, from government planning sessions to puppetry workshops and congregational meetings. "The supervisors of Franklin County, VA, spent several days at a retreat to plan for the future of the county at the Phoebe Needles." Puppeteers Mimi Buyler and Jim Tucker taught a puppetry workshop at Phoebe Needles in 2004. “"It's great to teach the joy of puppetry to adults and kids," Tucker said. Puppetry, he explained, has its roots in religion. It was used in the past to relate Bible stories to those who were illiterate or didn't have access to the printed text. "In a way, puppetry is going back to its original role," Tucker said, referring to the subject of the upcoming workshop.

== Bibliography ==
- Dashiell, Joe. “Phoebe Needles Center celebrates 100th anniversary of landmark building.” April 29, 2017. WDBJ Channel 7.
- Harrison, Ora. "The Mission House in Endicott, Virginia; Among the Virginia Mountains." The Spirit of Missions, Volume 86. Episcopal Church. Board of Missions, Episcopal Church. Domestic and Foreign Missionary Society. J. L. Powell, 1921. Page 454-456.
- Herrick, Gene E. “Phoebe Needles provides a great summer camp.” Roanoke Times. June 9, 2018.
- “Phoebe Needles Center celebrates 100th anniversary.” Franklin News-Post. May 22, 2017.
- Maxey, Esther Fox. Miss Ora and Miss Etta: A Folk History of the Women at the Episcopal Mission Schools: St. John's-in-the-Mountains, St. Peter's-in-the-Mountains. Rocky Mount, Va: The Author, 1984. 31 pages: illustrations, photographs, map.
- “Phoebe Needles Center celebrates 100th anniversary.” Franklin News-Post. May 22, 2017.
- Renick, Van T. Franklin County, Va. Parish Records, 1858-1998: Including Ascension, Emmanuel, St. John's, St. Peter's, and Trinity. Rocky Mount, Va: V.T. Renick, 1998.
- Shenandoah Valley Regional Studies Seminar. A Mission from Within: The Phoebe Needles Memorial School. 2000. 81 pages.
- Sowder, Wilson T. The Early Days at St. Peters-in-the-Mountains. [Place of publication not identified]: [publisher not identified], 1982.
- Three Episcopal Missions: Ascension Church, St. Peter's-in-the Mountains, and St. John's in the Mountains. [Place of publication not identified]: [publisher not identified], 1972.
