= Trinity, Virginia =

Unincorporated community in Virginia, United States

Trinity
- Unincorporated community
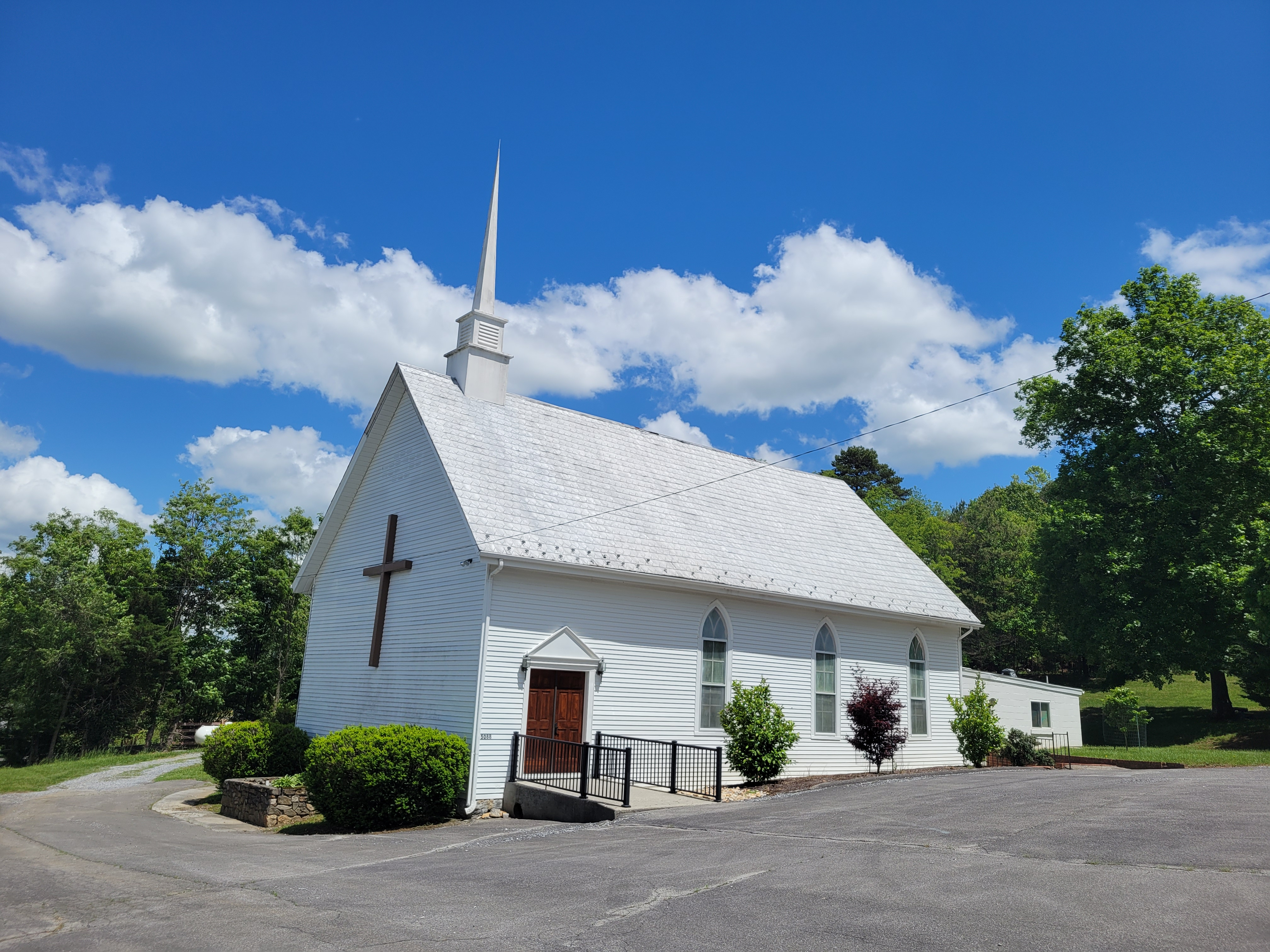
- Trinity Church of the Brethren

- Location within the Commonwealth of Virginia Trinity (the United States)
- Coordinates: 37°27′21″N 79°53′23″W
- Country: United States
- State: Virginia
- County: Botetourt
- Time zone: UTC−5 (Eastern (EST))
  - Summer (DST): UTC−4 (EDT)

Trinity is an unincorporated community in Botetourt County, Virginia, United States.
