= Matt Bondurant =

American novelist

- Born: Alexandria, Virginia, U.S.
- Education: James Madison University (BA, MA); Florida State University (PhD)
- Occupation: Novelist
- Website: www.mattbondurant.com

Matt Bondurant is an American novelist. Among his works are the books The Third Translation (2005), The Wettest County in the World (2008), The Night Swimmer (2012), and Oleander City (2022).

== Early life and education ==
Bondurant was born and raised in Alexandria, Virginia.

He graduated with a B.A. and M.A. in English from James Madison University. Bondurant went on to earn a PhD in English at Florida State University in 2003.

== Career ==
Bondurant's first novel was The Third Translation (Hyperion 2005). His second novel The Wettest County in the World (Scribner 2008) became the 2012 film Lawless by director John Hillcoat. Bondurant's grandfather Jack and grand-uncles Forrest and Howard are the main characters in this novel set during the Depression and Prohibition in rural Virginia. His third book The Night Swimmer was published by Scribner in 2012. Oleander City was released in 2022. It is his second novel based on a true story, concerning events surrounding the 1900 Galveston hurricane, including the tragedy of the St. Mary's Orphanage and a boxing match between a young Jack Johnson, a Galveston native, and "Chrysanthemum Joe" Choynski, who many consider the greatest Jewish boxer of all time. His most recent novel is North Country - published in November, 2025, about a set of characters living in a small border town in Northern New York.

He previously taught literatary fiction and creative writing at George Mason University in Virginia, SUNY Plattsburgh, and University of Texas at Dallas. Bondurant currently teaches at the University of Mississippi in Oxford, Mississippi.

== Works ==
=== Novels ===
- The Third Translation (2005)
- The Wettest County in the World (2008)
- The Night Swimmer (2012)
- Oleander City (2022)
- North Country (2025)

== Adaptations ==
In 2009, director John Hillcoat was developing a film of the same name based on Bondurant's novel, with a script by Nick Cave, and starring Shia LaBeouf, Tom Hardy and Jessica Chastain. The project was shut down in January 2010 due to financing problems.

An independent studio called Annapurna Pictures (based in Los Angeles) revived the project later that year and began filming in late February 2011. Starring Shia LaBeouf, Tom Hardy, Guy Pearce, Gary Oldman, Mia Wasikowska, and Jessica Chastain. In March 2012, the title was changed to Lawless. The film was released in the U.S. in late August 2012.

== Reception ==
Bondurant was inspired by family stories to make Franklin County the setting of his Prohibition-era historical novel, The Wettest County in the World (2008). His grandfather, Jack Bondurant, and two granduncles ran a massive moonshining operation in the mountains of southwest Virginia. Reviewing the novel for Entertainment Weekly, Jennifer Reese said it was "somber, engrossing", and that Bondurant was "wonderful at evoking historical atmosphere," including "drunken gatherings that explode into shattering violence." She thought the pace slow in parts.
