= Claudville, Virginia =

Unincorporated community in Virginia, United States

Claudville
- Unincorporated community
- Location within the Commonwealth of Virginia Claudville (the United States)
- Coordinates: 36°34′50″N 80°26′0″W
- Country: United States
- State: Virginia
- County: Patrick
- Elevation: 1,457 ft (444 m)
- Time zone: UTC−5 (Eastern (EST))
  - Summer (DST): UTC−4 (EDT)
- Area code: 276
- GNIS feature ID: 1464956

Claudville is an unincorporated community in Patrick County, Virginia, United States. It is located near the Virginia/North Carolina state line at the intersection of Virginia State Route 103 and Virginia State Route 104. Claudville is named after Virginia governor Claude A. Swanson, who established the community's post office. Local business include a cafe opened by lifelong resident Harold E. Slate and a number of churches are also present throughout the community. The nearest community is Ararat, 5.3 miles away. The area is known for Civil War reenactments, and a goldfish farm. In October 2009, the area opened the first ever public white spaces broadband network. There is one school, Trinity Christian School.

== Notable person ==
- Tim Goad, NFL defensive tackle for nine seasons, chiefly with New England Patriots
