= Slate Mountain, North Carolina =

Unincorporated community in North Carolina, US

Coordinates: 36°32′13″N 80°30′22″W

Slate Mountain is an unincorporated community located in northeast Surry County, North Carolina, United States between the Ararat River and Archies Creek (Powell 1968, p. 457). The community of Slate Mountain is named for the nearby summit of Slate Mountain which has an elevation 1,966 feet.
