= Franklin County, Virginia =

County in Virginia, United States

- County
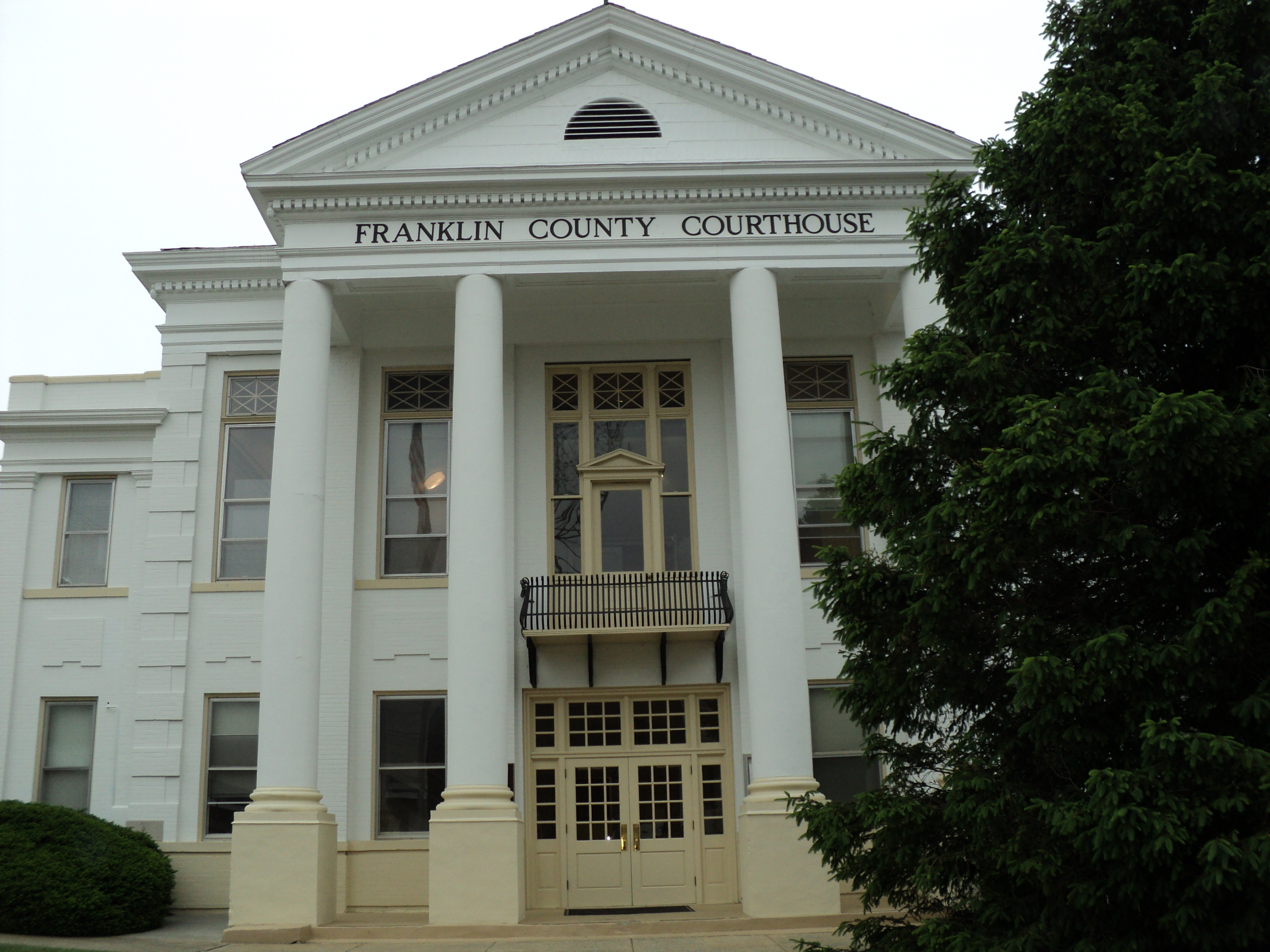
- Franklin County Courthouse in May 2010

- Flag Logo

- Location within the U.S. state of Virginia
- Coordinates: 36°59′N 79°53′W
- Country: United States
- State: Virginia
- Founded: 1785
- Named for: Benjamin Franklin
- Seat: Rocky Mount
- Largest town: Rocky Mount

Area
  - Total: 712 sq mi (1,840 km^{2})
  - Land: 690 sq mi (1,800 km^{2})
  - Water: 21 sq mi (54 km^{2}) 3.0%

Population (2020)
  - Total: 54,477
  - Estimate (2025): 55,526 ▲
  - Density: 77/sq mi (30/km^{2})
- Time zone: UTC−5 (Eastern)
  - Summer (DST): UTC−4 (EDT)
- Congressional district: 9th
- Website: www.franklincountyva.gov

Franklin County is a United States county situated in the Blue Ridge foothills of the Commonwealth of Virginia. Located in southwestern Virginia, the county geographically surrounds the seat of government at Rocky Mount, and the Roanoke River forms its northeastern boundary with Bedford County. The county is part of the Roanoke metropolitan area, and as of the 2020 census, its population was 54,477.

Franklin County was created in 1785 from parts of Bedford and Henry counties and named in honor of Founding Father Benjamin Franklin. During the Prohibition era, county residents produced large amounts of illegal liquor, earning the county the nickname "the moonshine capital of the world." Today, much tourism and economic development is driven by the county's location on the south shore of Smith Mountain Lake.

== History ==
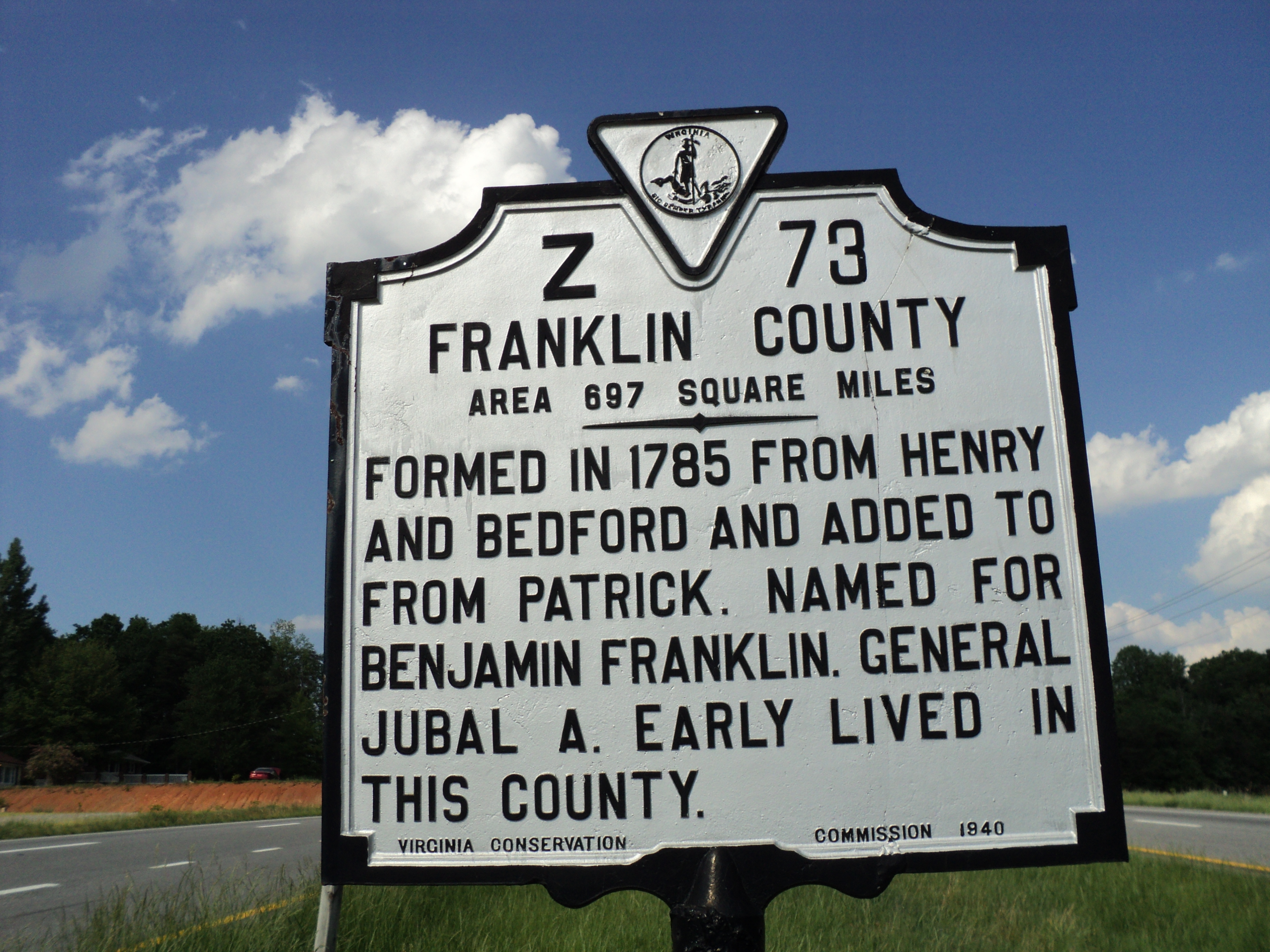
Franklin County historic marker, State of Virginia

The Blue Ridge Foothills had long been inhabited by Native Americans. At the time of European encounter, mostly Siouan-speaking tribes lived in this area.

A few colonists moved into the area before the American Revolutionary War, but most settlement happened afterward, as people moved west seeking new lands. Cultivation of tobacco had exhausted soils in the eastern part of the state. The county was formed in 1785 from parts of Bedford and Henry counties. It was named for Benjamin Franklin. The Piedmont and backcountry areas were largely settled by Scots-Irish, who were the last major immigrant group from the British Isles to enter the colonies before the Revolutionary War. There were also migrants from coastal areas, including free people of color, who moved to the frontier to escape racial strictures associated with the slave society of Tidewater Virginia.

=== Great Moonshine Conspiracy era ===
In the 20th century during Prohibition, local wits named Franklin County the "Moonshine Capital of the World", as moonshine production and bootlegging drove the economy. As of 2000, the local chamber of commerce had adopted the title as a heritage identification for the area. Moonshine is still being made in the area.

Historians estimate that in the 1920s, 99 of every 100 Franklin County residents were in some way involved in the illegal liquor trade. The bootleggers became involved with gangsters from Chicago and other major cities, and some local law enforcement officials were part of the criminal activities and killing of competitors. "Between 1930 and 1935 local still operators and their business partners sold a volume of whiskey that would have generated $5,500,000 in excise taxes at the old 1920 tax rate."

A lengthy federal investigation resulted in indictments and trials for 34 suspects in 1935 for what was called the "Great Moonshine Conspiracy," which attracted national attention. The writer Sherwood Anderson was among the many outsiders who came to cover the trial. At what was then the longest trial in state history, 31 people were convicted, but their jail sentences were relatively light (two years or less). Thirteen conspirators were sentenced only to probation.

This period has recently received new attention by writers. T. Keister Greer's history The Great Moonshine Conspiracy Trial of 1935 (2002) covered the trial and its background in the county. The writer Matt Bondurant had ancestors in the area, whose exploits during this period inspired his historical novel, The Wettest County in the World (2008). (The title was based on a statement by Anderson.) The book was adapted as a film, Lawless, in 2012. In 2014 an historical novel with much history about the county and town came out: "Moonshine Corner, Keys to Rocky Mount," ISBN 9781500980115, by the widow of T. Keister Greer, Ibby Greer.

=== Late 20th century to present ===
Since the 1980s, much residential development has occurred around Smith Mountain Lake. People live there who commute to work in the urbanized areas of Roanoke, Lynchburg, Martinsville, and Danville. Retirees have also moved in, and both groups have increased the county's population.

== Geography ==
According to the U.S. Census Bureau, the county has a total area of 712 square miles (1,840 km^{2}), of which 690 square miles (1,800 km^{2}) is land and 21 square miles (54 km^{2}) (3.0%) is water. It is upriver of the fall line of the Roanoke River, located at Roanoke Rapids, North Carolina.

=== Districts ===
The county is divided into supervisor districts; a few are: Blackwater, Blue Ridge, Boones Mill, Gills Creek, Rocky Mount, Snow Creek, Union Hall, Ferrum, Glade Hill, Penhook, and Callaway

=== Adjacent counties ===
- Bedford County — northeast
- Pittsylvania County — southeast
- Henry County — south
- Patrick County — southwest
- Floyd County — west
- Roanoke County — northwest

=== National protected areas ===
- Blue Ridge Parkway (part)
- Booker T. Washington National Monument

=== Major highways ===
- I-73 (future)
- US 220
- SR 40
- SR 116
- SR 122

== Demographics ==
Historical population
Census	Pop.	Note	%±
1790	6,842		—
1800	9,302		36.0%
1810	10,724		15.3%
1820	12,017		12.1%
1830	14,911		24.1%
1840	15,832		6.2%
1850	17,430		10.1%
1860	20,098		15.3%
1870	18,264		−9.1%
1880	25,084		37.3%
1890	24,985		−0.4%
1900	25,953		3.9%
1910	26,480		2.0%
1920	26,283		−0.7%
1930	24,337		−7.4%
1940	25,864		6.3%
1950	24,560		−5.0%
1960	25,925		5.6%
1970	26,858		3.6%
1980	35,740		33.1%
1990	39,549		10.7%
2000	47,286		19.6%
2010	56,159		18.8%
2020	54,477		−3.0%
2025 (est.)	55,526	▲	1.9%
U.S. Decennial Census; 1790-1960 1900-1990; 1990-2000 2010 2020

=== Racial and ethnic composition ===
Franklin County, Virginia – Racial and ethnic composition Note: the US Census treats Hispanic/Latino as an ethnic category. This table excludes Latinos from the racial categories and assigns them to a separate category. Hispanics/Latinos may be of any race.
Race / Ethnicity (NH = Non-Hispanic)	Pop 1980	Pop 1990	Pop 2000	Pop 2010	Pop 2020	% 1980	% 1990	% 2000	% 2010	% 2020
White alone (NH)	31,187	35,057	41,749	49,072	46,218	87.26%	88.64%	88.29%	87.38%	84.84%
Black or African American alone (NH)	4,283	4,225	4,393	4,541	3,848	11.98%	10.68%	9.29%	8.09%	7.06%
Native American or Alaska Native alone (NH)	19	39	73	112	75	0.05%	0.10%	0.15%	0.20%	0.14%
Asian alone (NH)	24	61	165	251	303	0.07%	0.15%	0.35%	0.45%	0.56%
Native Hawaiian or Pacific Islander alone (NH)	x	x	10	10	20	x	x	0.02%	0.02%	0.04%
Other race alone (NH)	15	30	38	144	153	0.04%	0.08%	0.08%	0.26%	0.28%
Mixed race or Multiracial (NH)	x	x	285	605	1,905	x	x	0.60%	1.08%	3.50%
Hispanic or Latino (any race)	212	137	573	1,424	1,955	0.59%	0.35%	1.21%	2.54%	3.59%
Total	35,740	39,549	47,286	56,159	54,477	100.00%	100.00%	100.00%	100.00%	100.00%

=== 2020 census ===
As of the 2020 census, the county had a population of 54,477. The median age was 48.6 years. 18.9% of residents were under the age of 18 and 24.9% of residents were 65 years of age or older. For every 100 females there were 96.8 males, and for every 100 females age 18 and over there were 94.8 males age 18 and over.

The racial makeup of the county was 85.7% White, 7.2% Black or African American, 0.3% American Indian and Alaska Native, 0.6% Asian, 0.0% Native Hawaiian and Pacific Islander, 1.7% from some other race, and 4.5% from two or more races. Hispanic or Latino residents of any race comprised 3.6% of the population.

9.9% of residents lived in urban areas, while 90.1% lived in rural areas.

There were 22,683 households in the county, of which 24.4% had children under the age of 18 living with them and 24.0% had a female householder with no spouse or partner present. About 27.0% of all households were made up of individuals and 14.1% had someone living alone who was 65 years of age or older.

There were 28,131 housing units, of which 19.4% were vacant. Among occupied housing units, 78.4% were owner-occupied and 21.6% were renter-occupied. The homeowner vacancy rate was 1.4% and the rental vacancy rate was 7.1%.

=== 2000 Census ===
As of the census of 2000, there were 47,286 people, 18,963 households, and 13,918 families residing in the county. The population density was 68 people per square mile (26 people/km^{2}). There were 22,717 housing units at an average density of 33 units per square mile (13 units/km^{2}). The racial makeup of the county was 88.95% White, 9.35% Black or African American, 0.19% Native American, 0.36% Asian, 0.02% Pacific Islander, 0.42% from other races, and 0.71% from two or more races. 1.21% of the population were Hispanic or Latino of any race.

There were 18,963 households, out of which 29.10% had children under the age of 18 living with them, 60.10% were married couples living together, 9.40% had a female householder with no husband present, and 26.60% were non-families. 22.60% of all households were made up of individuals, and 8.90% had someone living alone who was 65 years of age or older. The average household size was 2.44 and the average family size was 2.84.

In the county, the population was spread out, with 22.20% under the age of 18, 8.10% from 18 to 24, 28.20% from 25 to 44, 27.20% from 45 to 64, and 14.30% who were 65 years of age or older. The median age was 40 years. For every 100 females there were 97.20 males. For every 100 females age 18 and over, there were 96.30 males.

The median income for a household in the county was $38,056, and the median income for a family was $45,163. Males had a median income of $29,807 versus $22,215 for females. The per capita income for the county was $19,605. About 7.30% of families and 9.70% of the population were below the poverty line, including 12.70% of those under age 18 and 9.80% of those age 65 or over.

== Government ==
=== Board of supervisors ===
- Blackwater District: Marshall Jamison
- Blue Ridge District: Timothy Tatum
- Boone District: R.A. "Ronnie" Thompson
- Gills Creek District: Lorie Smith
- Rocky Mount District: Mike Carter
- Snow Creek District: Nicholas "Nick" Mitchell
- Union Hall District: Dan Quinn

=== Constitutional officers ===
- Clerk of the Circuit Court: Teresa J. Brown (I)
- Commissioner of the Revenue: Margaret Stone Torrence (I)
- Commonwealth's Attorney: Cooper Brown
- Sheriff: W.Q. "Bill" Overton Jr. (I)
- Treasurer: Susan J. Wray

Franklin is represented by Republicans David Suetterlein and Bill Stanley in the Virginia Senate, Republicans Wren Williams and Kathy Byron in the Virginia House of Delegates, and Morgan Griffith in the U.S. House of Representatives.

=== Education ===
Franklin County Schools operates public schools serving the county. The school system includes 12 elementary schools, one middle school, and one high school.

Middle School - Benjamin Franklin Middle School(BFMS), VA

High School - Franklin County High School(FCHS), VA

About four miles outside of Callaway is the Phoebe Needles Mission School, an Episcopal mission school dating from 1907. The school and mission church were used to serve the rural and mountain children of the county who could not get to the public schools in Callaway, Ferrum, or Rocky Mount. The school has now become a church parish, Center for Lifelong Learning and summer camp operated by the Episcopal Diocese of Southwestern Virginia.

Ferrum College was established in 1913. Ferrum College offers bachelor's degrees in twenty-eight major degree programs. The college continues to operate under the auspices of the Virginia Annual Conference of the United Methodist Church and the United Methodist Women of the Virginia Annual Conference.

United States presidential election results for Franklin County, Virginia
Year	Republican		Democratic		Third party(ies)	
Year	No.	%	No.	%	No.	%
1912	415	18.35%	1,238	54.73%	609	26.92%
1916	1,094	42.37%	1,481	57.36%	7	0.27%
1920	1,381	43.83%	1,765	56.01%	5	0.16%
1924	1,077	35.98%	1,902	63.55%	14	0.47%
1928	1,529	45.10%	1,861	54.90%	0	0.00%
1932	812	26.39%	2,245	72.96%	20	0.65%
1936	975	29.80%	2,285	69.83%	12	0.37%
1940	925	31.17%	2,037	68.63%	6	0.20%
1944	1,206	37.41%	2,002	62.10%	16	0.50%
1948	1,100	39.10%	1,343	47.74%	370	13.15%
1952	1,976	49.08%	2,012	49.98%	38	0.94%
1956	2,125	48.81%	2,142	49.20%	87	2.00%
1960	2,080	41.47%	2,924	58.29%	12	0.24%
1964	2,279	39.72%	3,447	60.08%	11	0.19%
1968	3,036	36.54%	2,025	24.37%	3,247	39.08%
1972	4,674	65.74%	2,273	31.97%	163	2.29%
1976	3,532	34.63%	6,439	63.13%	228	2.24%
1980	4,993	45.02%	5,685	51.26%	412	3.72%
1984	7,684	60.21%	4,903	38.42%	175	1.37%
1988	7,391	55.73%	5,734	43.24%	136	1.03%
1992	6,724	42.83%	6,590	41.97%	2,387	15.20%
1996	7,382	43.46%	7,300	42.97%	2,305	13.57%
2000	11,225	59.62%	7,145	37.95%	459	2.44%
2004	14,048	63.21%	8,002	36.01%	173	0.78%
2008	15,414	60.68%	9,618	37.86%	369	1.45%
2012	16,718	62.60%	9,090	34.04%	899	3.37%
2016	18,569	68.85%	7,257	26.91%	1,145	4.25%
2020	20,895	70.35%	8,381	28.22%	426	1.43%
2024	22,319	71.95%	8,321	26.82%	380	1.23%

== Communities ==
=== Towns ===
- Boones Mill
- Rocky Mount

=== Census-designated places ===
- Ferrum
- Henry Fork
- North Shore
- Penhook
- Union Hall
- Westlake Corner

=== Other unincorporated communities ===
- Burnt Chimney
- Callaway
- Glade Hill
- Hale's Ford
- Naff
- Redwood
- Snow Creek
- Wirtz
- Fork Mountain

== Notable people ==
- Jubal Anderson Early, Confederate general
- Booker T. Washington, a freedman (former slave) who became a leading educator and one of the prominent civil rights activists of his era, was born on the Burroughs Farm in Hale's Ford.
- Adam Clayton Powell Sr. (1865–1953), a prominent Baptist minister nationally, was born to Sally Dunning, a free woman of color whose family had been free for at least three generations before the Civil War. He worked his way through Wayland Seminary and graduate school at Yale University. After working in New Haven, he was called to the Abyssinian Baptist Church in Harlem, New York from 1908 to 1936, which he developed as the largest congregation in the US at the time, reaching 10,000 members.
- Bondurant Brothers; Howard, Forrest and Jack, were bootlegging brothers during the Prohibition Era from the Snow Creek Area of Franklin County. They are the main characters in Matt Bondurant's historical novel, The Wettest County in the World (2008), and in the film adapted from it, Lawless (2012).
- Ron Hodges, Major League Baseball catcher who played his entire career for the New York Mets from 1973 to 1984.
- Dwaine Board, National Football League Defensive Lineman and now Cleveland Browns defensive line coach was part of four Super Bowl victories for the San Francisco 49ers, three as a player (Super Bowl XVI, Super Bowl XIX, and Super Bowl XXIII) and one as a coach (Super Bowl XXIX). As a player Board recorded 61.0 career sacks and eight more in the postseason from 1979 to 1988. He earned Defensive Player of the Game honors in San Francisco's 38–16 win over Miami.
- Jesse L. Martin, actor, primarily known for his role as Detective Ed Green on the TV show Law & Order.
- Tarell Basham, National Football League outside linebacker for the Dallas Cowboys
- Clover-Lynn, bluesgrass and gothic country musician

== In popular culture ==
- Franklin County is the setting for Matt Bondurant's historical novel, The Wettest County in the World (2008) set in the Prohibition era, featuring his grandfather and two great-uncles among the bootleggers.
- Franklin County is featured in the film Lawless (2012), adapted from the novel in a screenplay by Nick Cave. It is directed by John Hillcoat.
- Franklin County, and subsequently Smith Mountain Lake, was the setting for Touchstone Pictures 1991 film "What About Bob?". The comedy film was directed by Frank Oz, and starred Bill Murray and Richard Dreyfuss. Murray plays Bob Wiley, a psychiatric patient who follows his egotistical psychiatrist Dr. Leo Marvin (Dreyfuss) on vacation. When the unstable Bob befriends the other members of Marvin's family, it pushes the doctor over the edge.
- Franklin County is the setting for Rebecca Ore's novella, Alien Bootlegger.

== See also ==
- National Register of Historic Places listings in Franklin County, Virginia
