= Piney River =

Piney River may refer to:

- Piney River (Colorado), a tributary of the Colorado River
- Piney River (East Tennessee), a tributary of the Tennessee River
- Piney River (Middle Tennessee), a tributary of the Duck River
- Piney River (Thornton River) in Virginia
- Piney River (Tye River) in Virginia
- Piney River, Virginia, an unincorporated community

== See also ==
- Big Piney River in Missouri
- Little Piney River in Virginia
