= List of rivers of Virginia =

This is a list of rivers in the U.S. state of Virginia.

This list is arranged by drainage basin, with respective tributaries, arranged in the order of their confluence from mouth to source, indented under each larger stream's name.

== Atlantic Ocean ==
=== North of Chesapeake Bay ===
- Cockle Creek
- Machipongo River

=== South of Chesapeake Bay ===
- Owl Creek

== Chesapeake Bay ==
This list is arranged counterclockwise, starting at the mouth of the Chesapeake on the Eastern Shore

=== Eastern Shore side (South to North) ===
- Kings Creek
- Hungars Creek
  - Mattawoman Creek
  - Jacobus Creek
- Westerhouse Creek
- Nassawadox Creek
- Occohannock Creek
- Craddock Creek
- Nandua Creek
  - Curratuck Creek
- Butcher Creek
- Pungoteague Creek
- Onancock Creek
  - Matchotank Creek
- Pocomoke River
  - Pitts Creek

=== Western Shore Side (North to south) ===
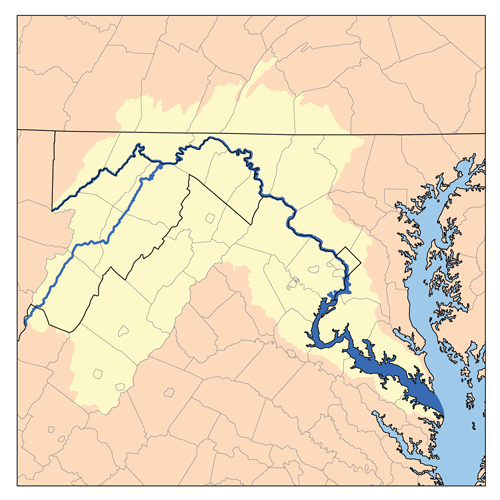
Potomac drainage basin

- Potomac River
  - Hull Creek
  - Coan River
  - Yeocomico River
    - Northwest Yeocomico River
    - South Yeocomico River
    - West Yeocomico River
  - Lower Machodoc Creek
  - Nomini Creek
  - Popes Creek
  - Mattox Creek
  - Rosier Creek
  - Upper Machodoc Creek
  - Potomac Creek
    - Accokeek Creek
  - Aquia Creek
  - Chopawamsic Creek
    - South Branch Chopawamsic
    - North Branch Chopawamsic
      - Middle Branch Chopawamsic
  - Quantico Creek
    - Deweys Creek
    - South Fork Quantico Creek
      - Mary Byrd Branch
  - Powells Creek
  - Occoquan River
    - Neabsco Creek
      - Cow Branch
      - Hoadly Run
    - Farm Creek
    - Marumsco Creek
      - Marumsco Acres Creek
      - Easy Creek
    - Catamount Creek
    - Kanes Creek
    - Thompson Creek
    - Massey Creek
    - South Branch
    - Giles Run
    - Swan Point Creek
    - Elkhorn Run
    - Hooes Run
    - Sandy Run
    - Hedges Run
    - Airport Creek
    - Stillwell Run
    - Wolf Run
      - Maple Branch
      - Swift Run
    - Bull Run
      - Old Mill Branch
      - Buckhall Branch
      - Popes Head Creek
        - Castle Creek
        - East Fork
      - Johnny More Creek
        - Polecat Branch
      - Russia Branch
      - Little Rocky Run
      - Cub Run
        - Rocky Run
        - Elklick Run
        - Flatlick Run
          - Frog Branch
        - Schneider Branch
        - Cain Branch
        - Dead Run
      - Flat Branch
      - Holkums Branch
      - Youngs Branch
        - Chinn Branch
      - Little Bull Run
        - Catharpin Creek
      - Foley Branch
      - Chestnut Lick
    - Crooked Creek
    - Purcell Branch
    - Cabin Run
    - Piney Branch
    - Cedar Run
      - Slate Run
      - Goodwins Branch
      - Lucky Run
        - Chestnut Branch
      - Goose Run
        - Goslin Run
      - Dorrells Run
      - Town Run
        - Elk Run
        - Negro Run
      - Walnut Branch
      - Licking Run
      - Owl Run
      - Turkey Run
      - Mill Run
      - Piney Branch
      - Towers Branch
    - Broad Run
      - Kettle Run
      - Winters Branch
      - Dawkins Branch
      - Rocky Branch
      - North Fork Broad Run
      - South Run
      - Cattletts Branch
      - Trapp Branch
      - Mill Run
  - Pohick Creek
  - Accotink Creek
    - Daniel's Run
  - Dogue Creek
  - Little Hunting Creek
  - Hunting Creek
    - Cameron Run
      - Holmes Run
  - Four Mile Run
    - Lubber Run
  - Pimmit Run
  - Difficult Run
    - Colvin Run
    - Little Difficult Run
  - Sugarland Run
  - Broad Run
    - Beaverdam Run
      - Russell Branch
    - Cabin Branch 2
    - Horsepen Run
      - Stallion Branch
      - Indian Creek
    - Cabin Branch 1
    - South Fork Broad Run
    - North Fork Broad Run
      - Lenah Run
  - Goose Creek
    - Little River
    - North Fork Goose Creek
      - Beaverdam Creek
  - Catoctin Creek
    - North Fork Catoctin Creek
    - South Fork Catoctin Creek
  - Shenandoah River
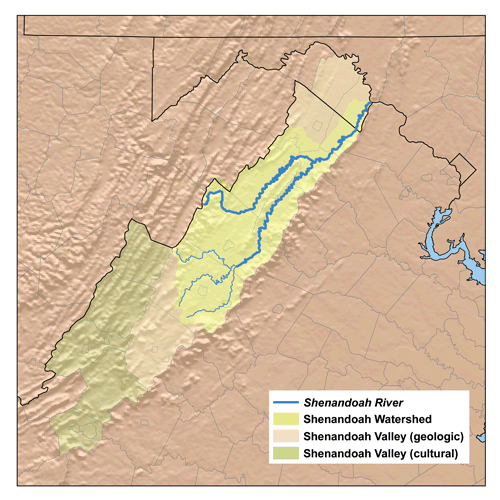
    Shenandoah drainage basin
    - North Fork Shenandoah River
      - Passage Creek
      - Cedar Creek
        - Stickley Run
      - Town Run
      - Toms Brook
        - Jordan Run
      - Stony Creek
      - Mill Creek
      - Smith Creek
      - Linville Creek
      - Shoemaker River
      - Little Dry River
      - German River
        - Cold Spring River
    - South Fork Shenandoah River
      - Hawksbill Creek
      - South River
        - Back Creek
      - North River
        - Middle River
          - Christians Creek
            - Folly Mills Creek
        - Naked Creek
        - Cooks Creek
        - Dry River
          - Muddy Creek
        - Beaver Creek
          - Briery Branch
        - Little River
  - Opequon Creek
    - Mill Creek
    - Abrams Creek
    - Red Bud Run
  - Back Creek
    - Hogue Creek
    - Isaacs Creek
  - Sleepy Creek
  - South Branch Potomac River
    - South Fork South Branch Potomac River
    - North Fork South Branch Potomac River
      - Laurel Fork
- Little Wicomico River
- Great Wicomico River

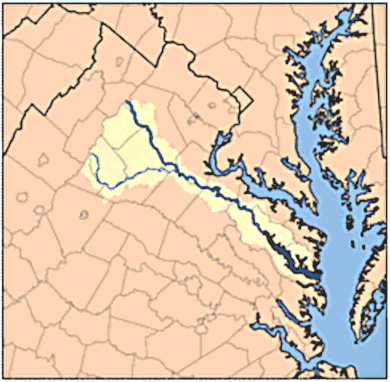
Rappahannock drainage basin

- Rappahannock River
  - Urbanna Creek
  - Lagrange Creek
  - Parrotts Creek
  - Corrotoman River
  - Totuskey Creek
  - Piscataway Creek
  - Hoskins Creek
  - Cat Point Creek
  - Occupacia Creek
  - Mills Creek
    - Peumansend Creek
  - Rapidan River
    - Mine Run
    - Robinson River
      - Rose River
    - South River
    - Conway River
    - Staunton River
  - Mountain Run
  - Hazel River
    - Thornton River
      - Rush River
        - Covington River
      - Piney River
    - Hughes River
  - Jordan River
- Piankatank River
  - Dragon Swamp
- East River
- North River
- Ware River
- Severn River

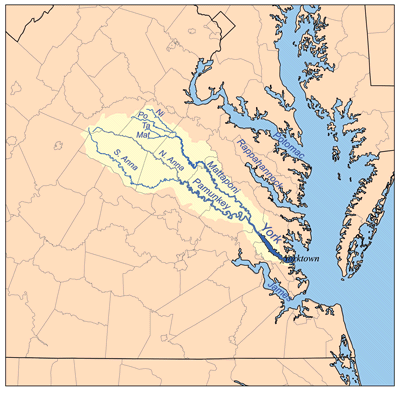
York drainage basin

- York River
  - Perrin River
  - Queen Creek
  - Poropotank River
  - Mattaponi River
    - Maracossic Creek
    - South River
      - Motto River
    - Matta River
      - Mat River
      - Ta River
    - Poni River
      - Po River
      - Ni River
  - Pamunkey River
    - South Anna River
      - Newfound River
      - Taylors Creek
    - North Anna River
      - Little River
      - Pamunkey Creek
      - Contrary Creek
- Poquoson River
- Back River
  - Harris River
- Hampton Roads
  - Hampton River
  - Elizabeth River
    - Lafayette River
    - Western Branch Elizabeth River
    - Eastern Branch Elizabeth River
      - Indian River
    - Southern Branch Elizabeth River
  - James River
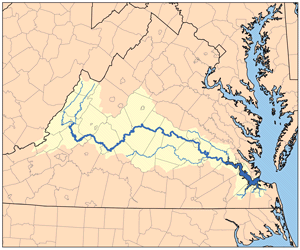
    James drainage basin
    - Hoffler Creek
    - Nansemond River
      - Knotts Creek
      - Bennett Creek
    - Chuckatuck Creek
      - Brewers Creek
    - Pagan River
    - Warwick River
    - Lawnes Creek
    - Skiffes Creek
    - College Creek
    - Grays Creek
    - Chickahominy River
      - Diascund Creek
    - Upper Chippokes Creek
    - Wards Creek
    - Bailey Creek
    - Appomattox River
      - Cabin Creek
      - Swift Creek
      - Namozine Creek
      - Deep Creek
      - Flat Creek
      - Bush River
        - Sandy River
      - Buffalo Creek
    - Falling Creek
    - Powhite Creek
    - Deep Creek
    - Muddy Creek
    - Willis River
      - Little Willis River
    - Byrd Creek
    - Rivanna River
      - Mechunk Creek
      - Buck Island Creek
      - Limestone Creek
      - Carroll Creek
      - Henderson Creek
      - Moores Creek
      - Meadow Creek
        - St. Charles Creek
        - Schenks Branch
      - North Fork Rivanna River
        - Lynch River
        - Roach River
      - South Fork Rivanna River
        - Mechums River
        - Moormans River
          - Doyles River
    - Slate River
      - North River
    - Hardware River
    - Rockfish River
    - Tye River
      - Rucker Run
      - Buffalo River
      - Piney River
        - Little Piney River
      - South Fork Tye River
      - North Fork Tye River
    - David Creek
    - Beaver Creek
    - Blackwater Creek
      - Ivy Creek
    - Harris Creek
    - Pedlar River
    - Maury River
      - Buffalo Creek
        - North Buffalo Creek
        - South Buffalo Creek
      - South River
        - Irish Creek
        - Saint Marys River
      - Whistle Creek
      - Kerrs Creek
      - Hays Creek
      - Little Calfpasture River
      - Calfpasture River
        - Mill Creek (Calfpasture River tributary)
    - Cedar Creek (James River tributary)
    - Catawba Creek
    - Craig Creek
      - Johns Creek
    - Mill Creek (James River tributary)
    - Sinking Creek
    - Cowpasture River
      - Stuart Run
      - Bullpasture River
    - Jackson River
      - Potts Creek
      - Dunlap Creek
        - Ogle Creek (Virginia)
      - Cedar Creek (Jackson River tributary)
      - Back Creek
        - Little Back Creek
- Lynnhaven River

== Albemarle Sound ==
- North Landing River
  - Pocaty River
- Northwest River (Virginia)

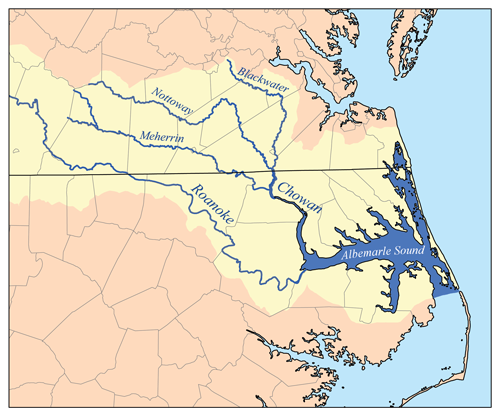
Chowan drainage basin

- Chowan River (NC)
  - Meherrin River
    - Fountains Creek
    - Flat Rock Creek
    - North Meherrin River
      - Reedy Creek
    - South Meherrin River
      - Middle Meherrin River
  - Somerton Creek
  - Blackwater River
  - Nottoway River
    - Mill Creek
    - Nottoway Swamp
    - Assamoosick Swamp
    - Three Creek
    - Raccoon Creek
    - Hunting Quarter Swamp
    - Rowanty Creek
    - Stony Creek
      - Sappony Creek
    - Sturgeon Creek
    - Waqua Creek
    - Tommeheton Creek
    - Crooked Creek
    - Little Nottoway River
      - Horsepen Creek
      - Jacks Branch
      - Whetstone Creek
      - Long Branch
      - Lazaretto Creek
      - Mallorys Creek
      - Carys Creek

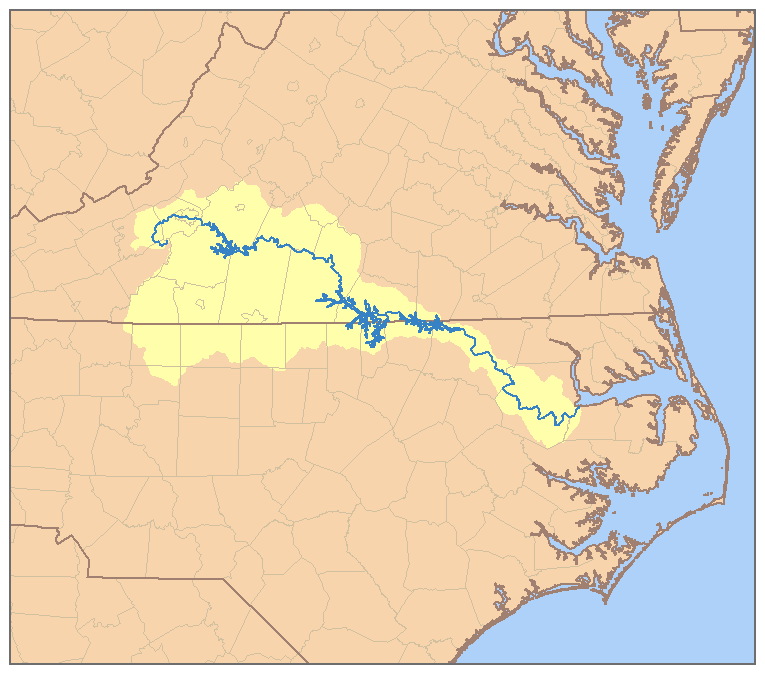
Roanoke drainage basin

- Roanoke River (or Staunton River)
  - Allen Creek (Roanoke River tributary)
  - Island Creek
  - Grassy Creek
  - Bluestone Creek
    - Little Bluestone Creek
  - Dan River
    - Line Branch
    - Aarons Creek
      - North Fork
      - Big Branch
      - Perkins Branch
      - Big Mountain Branch
      - Mountain Branch
      - Wolfpit Run
    - Hyco River
      - Morris Branch
      - Flat Branch
      - Hilly Creek
      - Pensions Branch
      - Larkin Branch
      - Terrell Branch
      - Hudson Branch
      - Bluewing Creek
      - Halfway Creek
      - Dry Creek
      - Coleman Creek
      - Mayo Creek
        - Crutchfield Branch
      - Bowes Branch
    - Lick Branch
    - Banister River
      - Gibson Creek
      - Wolf Trap Creek
      - Myers Creek
      - Winn Creek
      - Toots Creek
      - Terrible Creek
        - Little Terrible Creek
      - Kents Creek
      - Polecat Creek
        - Little Polecat Creek
      - Sandy Creek
        - Johns Run
        - Lick Branch
        - Bar Branch
        - Pine Creek
        - Sweden Fork
          - Johns Run
      - Bye Creek
      - Bradley Creek
      - Runaway Creek
      - Elkhorn Creek
      - Brush Creek
      - Squirrel Creek
      - Allen Creek
        - Blacks Creek
        - Peters Creek
      - Bird Creek
      - Stinking River
        - Flyblow Creek
        - Dry Branch
        - Maggotty Creek
        - North Fork Stinking River
        - West Fork Stinking River
      - Shockoe Creek
      - Whitethorn Creek
        - Dry Branch
        - Georges Creek
        - Dry Branch
        - Mill Creek
          - Poplar Branch
        - Long Branch
      - Cherrystone Creek
        - Little Cherrystone Creek
        - Tanyard Branch
        - Green Rock Branch
        - Whites Branch
        - Roaring Fork
        - Pole Bridge Branch
      - White Oak Creek
        - Dry Fork
      - Pudding Creek
        - Tompkins Branch
      - Bearskin Creek
        - Lick Branch
        - Bolin Branch
        - Little Bearskin Creek
        - Hemp Fork
      - Strawberry Creek
        - Morris Branch
      - Robins Branch
      - Wet Sleeve Creek
      - Mitchell Branch
    - Chatman Branch
    - Grassy Creek
    - Perrin Creek
    - Reedy Creek
    - Poplar Creek
    - Pond Branch
    - Miry Creek
    - Lawsons Creek
      - Stokes Creek
        - Bowle Spring Branch
      - Jerimy Creek
      - Butrum Creek
      - Long Branch
    - Country Line Creek
    - Sandy River
    - Cascade Creek
    - Smith River
      - Leatherwood Creek
    - Mayo River
      - North Mayo River
      - South Mayo River
        - Russell Creek
    - Little Dan River
      - Browns Dan River
  - Difficult Creek
  - Roanoke Creek
  - Cub Creek
  - Falling River
    - Little Falling River
    - Mollys Creek
    - South Fork Falling River
  - Straightstone Creek
  - Seneca Creek
    - West Little Seneca Creek
    - East Little Seneca Creek
  - Big Otter River
    - Little Otter River
  - Goose Creek (Roanoke River tributary)
  - Pigg River
    - Snow Creek
    - Big Chestnut Creek
  - Blackwater River
    - Maggodee Creek
  - Back Creek
  - Tinker Creek
  - North Fork Roanoke River
  - South Fork Roanoke River
    - Goose Creek (South Fork Roanoke River tributary)

== Winyah Bay ==
- Pee Dee River (SC)
  - Yadkin River (NC)
    - Ararat River
      - Stewarts Creek
        - Pauls Creek
          - Brushy Fork
          - Little Pauls Creek
          - Garners Creek
        - Stony Creek
          - Huntington Branch
        - Naked Run
        - Flat Creek
        - Turkey Creek
        - North Fork Stewarts Creek
        - South Fork Stewarts Creek
      - Lovills Creek
        - Halls Branch
        - Elk Spur Branch
        - Waterfall Branch
      - Johnson Creek
        - East Fork Johnson Creek
      - Clarks Creek
        - Double Spring Branch
        - Long Branch
      - Owens Branch
      - Doe Run Creek
      - Birds Branch
        - Dry Run
      - Grogen Branch
      - Kings Run
      - Sun Run
      - Thompson Creek
    - Fisher River
      - Gully Creek

== Mississippi River ==
=== Tennessee River ===
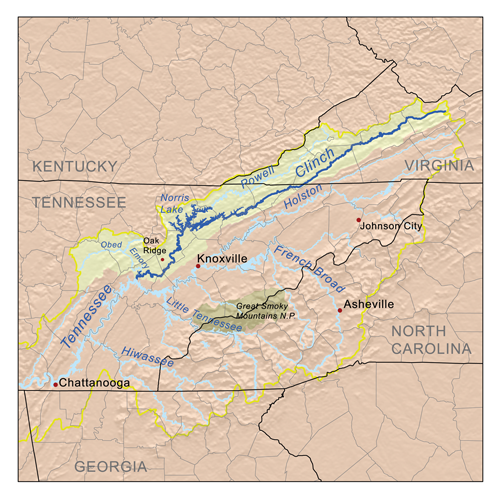
Clinch drainage basin

- Tennessee River (TN)
  - Clinch River
    - Powell River
      - Indian Creek
      - Martin Creek
      - Wallen Creek
      - North Fork Powell River
      - South Fork Powell River
    - North Fork Clinch River
    - Copper Creek
    - Stock Creek
    - Guest River
    - Little River
    - Big Creek
    - Indian Creek
  - Holston River (TN)
    - North Fork Holston River
      - Possum Creek
      - Big Moccasin Creek
      - Laurel Creek (North Fork Holston River tributary)
    - South Fork Holston River
      - Beaver Creek
      - Middle Fork Holston River
      - Laurel Creek (South Fork Holston River tributary)
        - Whitetop Laurel Creek

=== Ohio River ===
- Ohio River (KY, WV)

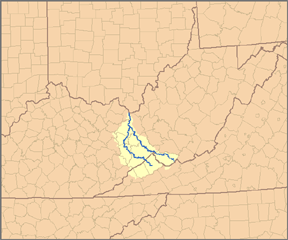
Big Sandy River drainage basin

  - Big Sandy River (KY)
    - Levisa Fork
      - Russell Fork
        - Pound River
          - Cranes Nest River
        - McClure River
      - Home Creek
      - Slate Creek
      - Dismal Creek (tributary of Levisa Fork)
    - Tug Fork
      - Knox Creek
      - Dry Fork

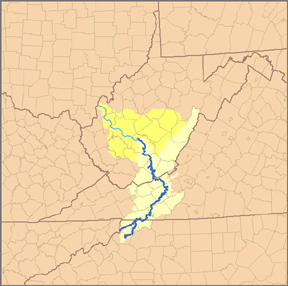
New River drainage basin

  - Kanawha River (WV)
    - New River
      - Bluestone River
      - East River
      - Wolf Creek
      - Walker Creek
        - Little Walker Creek
        - Kimberling Creek
      - Sinking Creek
      - Little River (New River tributary)
        - Pine Creek (Floyd County, Virginia)
        - West Fork Little River
      - Peak Creek
      - Big Reed Island Creek
        - Cripple Creek
        - Crooked Creek
          - Beaverdam Creek
          - Glade Creek
        - Grassy Creek
        - Greasy Creek
          - Big Branch
        - Laurel Fork (Virginia)
        - Little Snake Creek
          - Bear Creek
        - Pine Creek
        - Pipestem Branch
        - Snake Creek
        - Sulphur Spring Branch
        - Stone Mountain Creek
      - Burks Fork
      - Little Reed Island Creek
      - Reed Creek
      - Chestnut Creek
      - Elk Creek
      - Little River (North Carolina–Virginia)
      - Fox Creek
      - Wilson Creek
      - North Fork New River
        - Helton Creek
        - Big Horse Creek

== Alphabetically ==
- Aarons Creek
- Abrams Creek
- Accokeek Creek
- Accotink Creek
- Allen Creek (Roanoke River tributary)
- Appomattox River
- Aquia Creek
- Ararat River
- Back Creek (Jackson River tributary)
- Back Creek (Potomac River tributary)
- Back Creek (Roanoke River tributary)
- Back Creek (South River tributary)
- Back River
- Bailey Creek
- Banister River
- Beaver Creek (James River tributary)
- Beaver Creek (North River tributary)
- Beaver Creek (South Fork Holston River tributary)
- Beaverdam Creek
- Bennett Creek
- Big Chestnut Creek
- Big Creek
- Big Horse Creek
- Big Moccasin Creek
- Big Otter River
- Big Reed Island Creek
- Birds Branch (Ararat River tributary)
- Blackwater Creek
- Blackwater River (Chowan River tributary)
- Blackwater River (Roanoke River tributary)
- Bluestone Creek
- Bluestone River
- Bluewing Creek
- Bowes Branch
- Brewers Creek
- Briery Branch
- Broad Run (Occoquan River tributary)
- Broad Run (Potomac River tributary)
- Browns Dan River
- Buck Island Creek
- Buffalo Creek (Appomattox River tributary)
- Buffalo Creek (Maury River tributary)
- Buffalo River
- Bull Run
- Bullpasture River
- Burke Fork
- Bush River
- Byrd Creek
- Cabin Creek
- Cameron Run
- Carys Creek (Little Nottoway River tributary)
- Cascade Creek
- Catawba Creek
- Catoctin Creek
- Calfpasture River
- Cat Point Creek
- Cedar Creek (Jackson River tributary)
- Cedar Creek (James River tributary)
- Cedar Creek (North Fork Shenandoah River tributary)
- Cedar Run (Occoquan River tributary)
- Chickahominy River
- Chopawamsic Creek
- Chestnut Creek
- Christians Creek
- Chuckatuck Creek
- Clarks Creek (Ararat River tributary)
- Clinch River
- Coan River
- Cockle Creek
- Cold Spring River
- Coleman Creek
- College Creek
- Conway River
- Cooks Creek
- Copper Creek
- Corrotoman River
- Country Line Creek
- Covington River
- Cowpasture River
- Craig Creek
- Cranes Nest River
- Cripple Creek
- Crooked Creek
- Cub Creek
- Cub Run
- Dan River
- David Creek
- Deep Creek (Appomattox River tributary)
- Deep Creek (James River tributary)
- Diascund Creek
- Difficult Creek
- Difficult Run
- Dismal Creek (tributary of Levisa Fork)
- Doe Run Creek (Ararat River tributary)
- Dogue Creek
- Doyles River
- Dreaming Creek
- Dry Fork
- Dry Creek
- Dry River
- Dunlap Creek
- East Little Seneca Creek
- East River (Giles County)
- East River (Mathews County)
- Eastern Branch Elizabeth River
- Elizabeth River
- Elk Creek
- Falling Creek
- Falling River
- Fisher River
- Flat Branch
- Flat Creek
- Flat Rock Creek
- Folly Mills Creek
- Fountains Creek
- Four Mile Run
- Fox Creek
- German River
- Goose Creek (Potomac River tributary)
- Goose Creek (Roanoke River tributary)
- Goose Creek (South Fork Roanoke River tributary)
- Grassy Creek
- Grays Creek
- Great Wicomico River
- Grogen Branch
- Guest River
- Halfway Creek
- Hampton River
- Hardware River
- Harris Creek
- Harris River
- Hawksbill Creek
- Hays Creek
- Hazel River
- Helton Creek
- Hilly Creek
- Hogue Creek
- Home Creek
- Horsepen Creek (Little Nottoway River tributary)
- Hoskins Creek
- Hudson Branch
- Hughes River
- Hull Creek
- Hunting Creek
- Hyco River
- Indian Creek (Clinch River tributary)
- Indian Creek (Powell River tributary)
- Indian River
- Irish Creek
- Isaacs Creek
- Island Creek
- Ivy Creek
- Jackson River
- Jacks Branch (Little Nottoway River tributary)
- James River
- Johns Creek
- Jordan River
- Kerrs Creek
- Kettle Run
- Kimberling Creek
- Kings Run (Ararat River tributary)
- Knotts Creek
- Knox Creek
- Lafayette River
- Lagrange Creek
- Larkin Branch
- Laurel Creek (North Fork Holston River tributary)
- Laurel Creek (South Fork Holston River tributary)
- Laurel Fork
- Lawnes Creek
- Lazaretto Creek (Little Nottoway River tributary)
- Leatherwood Creek
- Levisa Fork
- Linville Creek
- Little Back Creek
- Little Bluestone Creek
- Little Bull Run
- Little Calfpasture River
- Little Dan River
- Little Dry River
- Little Falling River
- Little Hunting Creek
- Little Nottoway River
- Little Otter River
- Little Piney River
- Little Reed Island Creek
- Little River (Clinch River tributary)
- Little River (Goose Creek tributary)
- Little River (New River tributary)
- Little River (North Anna River tributary)
- Little River (North Carolina–Virginia)
- Little River (North River tributary)
- Little Walker Creek
- Little Wicomico River
- Little Willis River
- Long Branch (Little Nottoway River tributary)
- Lovills Creek
- Lower Machodoc Creek
- Lynch River
- Lynnhaven River
- McClure River
- Machipongo River
- Maggodee Creek
- Mallorys Creek (Little Nottoway River tributary)
- Maracossic Creek
- Martin Creek
- Mat River
- Matta River
- Mattaponi River
- Mattox Creek
- Maury River
- Mayo Creek
- Mayo River
- Mechums River
- Mechunk Creek
- Meherrin River
- Middle Fork Holston River
- Middle Meherrin River
- Middle River
- Mill Creek (Calfpasture River tributary)
- Mill Creek (James River tributary)
- Mill Creek (North Fork Shenandoah River tributary)
- Mill Creek (Opequon Creek tributary)
- Mine Run
- Mollys Creek
- Moormans River
- Morris Branch
- Mosquito Creek
- Motto River
- Mountain Run
- Muddy Creek (Dry River tributary)
- Muddy Creek (James River tributary)
- Naked Creek
- Namozine Creek
- Nansemond River
- Neabsco Creek
- Tims River
- New River
- Newfound River
- Ni River
- Nomini Creek
- North Anna River
- North Buffalo Creek
- North Fork Catoctin Creek
- North Fork Clinch River
- North Fork Goose Creek
- North Fork Holston River
- North Fork Powell River
- North Fork Rivanna River
- North Fork Roanoke River
- North Fork Shenandoah River
- North Fork Tye River
- North Landing River
- North Mayo River
- North Meherrin River
- North River (Mobjack Bay)
- North River (Slate River tributary)
- North River (South Fork Shenandoah River tributary)
- Northwest River
- Northwest Yeocomico River
- Nottoway River
- Occoquan River
- Occupacia Creek
- Ogle Creek (Virginia)
- Opequon Creek
- Owens Branch (Ararat River tributary)
- Pagan River
- Pamunkey Creek
- Pamunkey River
- Parrotts Creek
- Passage Creek
- Peak Creek
- Pedlar River
- Pensions Branch
- Perrin River
- Peumansend Creek
- Piankatank River
- Pigg River
- Pimmit Run
- Piney River (Thornton River tributary)
- Piney River (Tye River tributary)
- Piscataway Creek
- Po River
- Pocaty River
- Pocomoke River
- Pohick Creek
- Poni River
- Popes Creek
- Popes Head Creek
- Poquoson River
- Poropotank River
- Possum Creek
- Potomac Creek
- Potomac River
- Potts Creek
- Pound River
- Powell River
- Powhite Creek
- Quantico Creek
- Queen Creek
- Rapidan River
- Rappahannock River
- Red Bud Run
- Reed Creek
- Reed Island Creek
- Reedy Creek
- Rivanna River
- Roach River
- Roanoke Creek
- Roanoke River (or Staunton River)
- Robinson River
- Rockfish River
- Rose River
- Rosier Creek
- Rowanty Creek
- Rucker Run
- Rush River
- Russell Creek
- Russell Fork
- Saint Marys River
- Sandy Creek
- Sandy River (Bush River tributary)
- Sandy River (Dan River tributary)
- Sappony Creek
- Seneca Creek
- Severn River
- Shenandoah River
- Shoemaker River
- Sinking Creek (James River tributary)
- Sinking Creek (New River tributary)
- Skiffes Creek
- Slate Creek
- Slate River
- Sleepy Creek
- Smith Creek
- Smith River
- Snake Creek
- Snow Creek
- Somerton Creek
- South Anna River
- Stave Run
- South Branch Potomac River
- South Buffalo Creek
- South Fork Catoctin Creek
- South Fork Clinch River
- South Fork Elizabeth River
- South Fork Falling River
- South Fork Holston River
- South Fork Powell River
- South Fork Rivanna River
- South Fork Roanoke River
- South Fork Shenandoah River
- South Fork South Branch Potomac River
- South Fork Tye River
- South Mayo River
- South Meherrin River
- South River (Mattaponi River tributary)
- South River (Maury River tributary)
- South River (Rapidan River tributary)
- South River (Shenandoah River tributary)
- South Yeocomico River
- Southern Branch Elizabeth River
- Staunton River (Rapidan River tributary)
- Staunton River (or Roanoke River)
- Stewarts Creek
- Stinking River
- Stock Creek
- Stony Creek (North Fork Shenandoah River tributary)
- Stony Creek (Nottoway River tributary)
- Straightstone Creek
- Stuart Run
- Sugarland Run
- Sun Run (Ararat River tributary)
- Swift Creek
- Ta River
- Taylors Creek
- Tear Wallet Creek
- Terrell Branch
- Thompson Creek (Ararat River tributary)
- Thornton River
- Three Creek
- Tinker Creek
- Totuskey Creek
- Tug Fork
- Tye River
- Upper Chippokes Creek
- Upper Machodoc Creek
- Urbanna Creek
- Walker Creek
- Wallen Creek
- Wards Creek
- Ware River
- Warwick River
- West Fork Little River
- West Little Seneca Creek
- West Yeocomico River
- Western Branch Elizabeth River
- Whetstone Creek (Little Nottoway River tributary)
- Whistle Creek
- Whitetop Laurel Creek
- Willis River
- Wilson Creek
- Wolf Creek
- Yeocomico River
- York River

== See also ==
- List of rivers of the United States
- List of Chesapeake Bay rivers
