= Parrotts Creek =

Stream in Virginia, USA

Parrotts Creek Tributary to Rappahannock River
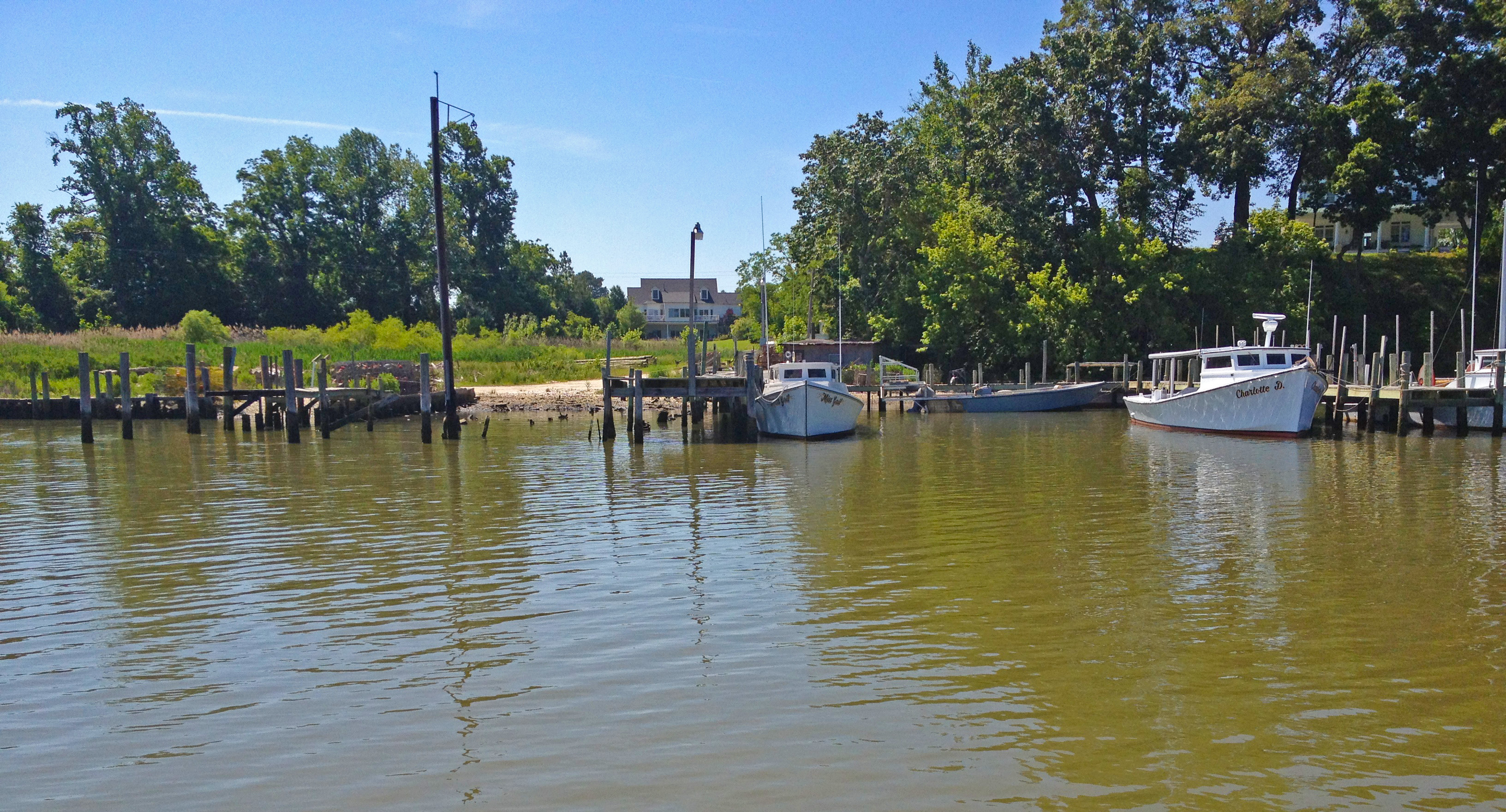
- Rappahannock River at Parrotts Creek in Waterview, Virginia

- Location of Parrotts Creek mouth Parrotts Creek (the United States)

Location
- Country: United States
- State: Virginia
- County: Middlesex

Physical characteristics
- Source: Briery Swamp divide
  - location: about 0.1 miles southeast of Jamaica, Virginia
  - coordinates: 37°42′39″N 076°41′24″W
  - elevation: 80 ft (24 m)
- Mouth: Rappahannock River
  - location: Ross Point, Virginia
  - coordinates: 37°43′52″N 076°37′06″W
  - elevation: 0 ft (0 m)
- Length: 5.16 mi (8.30 km)
- Basin size: 8.44 square miles (21.9 km^{2})
- Discharge
  - location: Rappahannock River
  - average: 9.50 cu ft/s (0.269 m^{3}/s) at mouth with Rappahannock River

Basin features
- Progression: generally east
- River system: Rappahannock River
- Tributaries
  - left: unnamed tributaries
  - right: Wyatt Swamp
- Waterbodies: Beazley Pond

Parrotts Creek is a 5.16 mi (8.30 km) long 3rd order tributary to the Rappahannock River in Middlesex County, Virginia, United States.

== Variant names ==
According to the Geographic Names Information System, it has also been known historically as:

- Parrott's Creek

== Course ==
Parrotts Creek rises on the Briery Swamp divide about 0.1 miles southeast of Jamaica, Virginia. Parrotts Creek then flows easterly to meet the Rappahannock River at Ross Point, Virginia.

== Watershed ==
Parrotts Creek drains 8.44 square miles (21.9 km^{2}) of area, receives about 45.6 in/year of precipitation, has a topographic wetness index of 446.54 and is about 62.7% forested.

== Maps ==
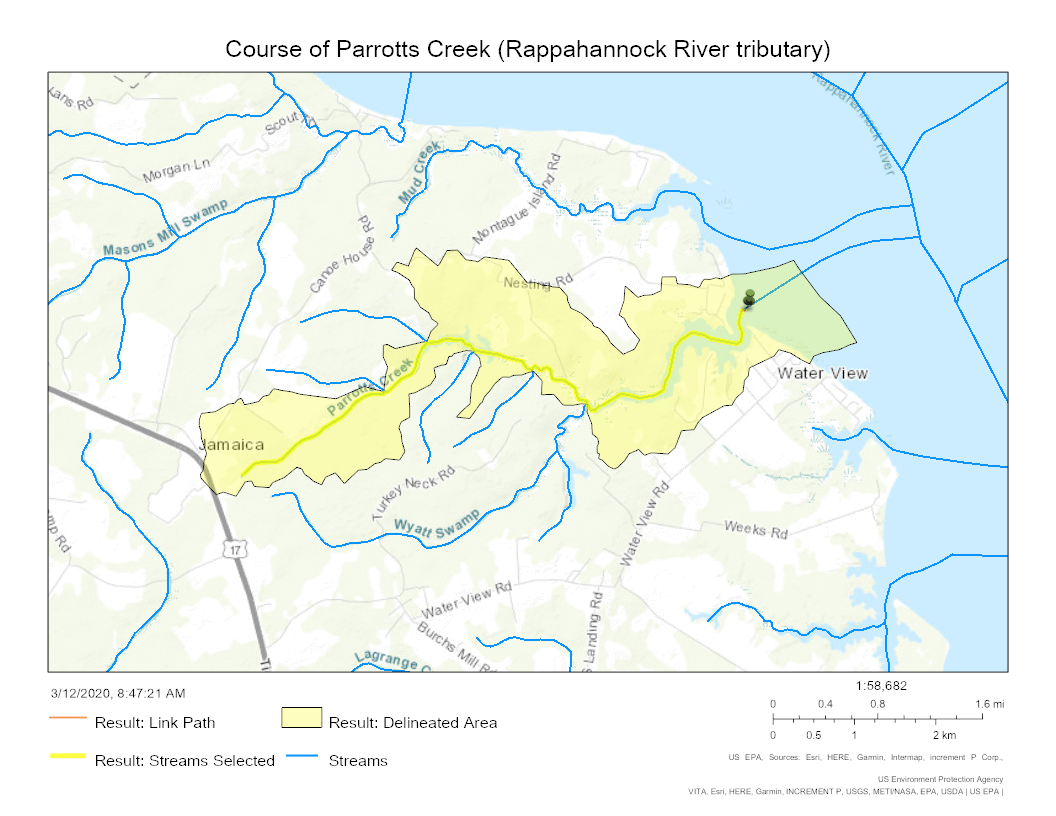
Course of Parrotts Creek (Rappahannock River tributary)

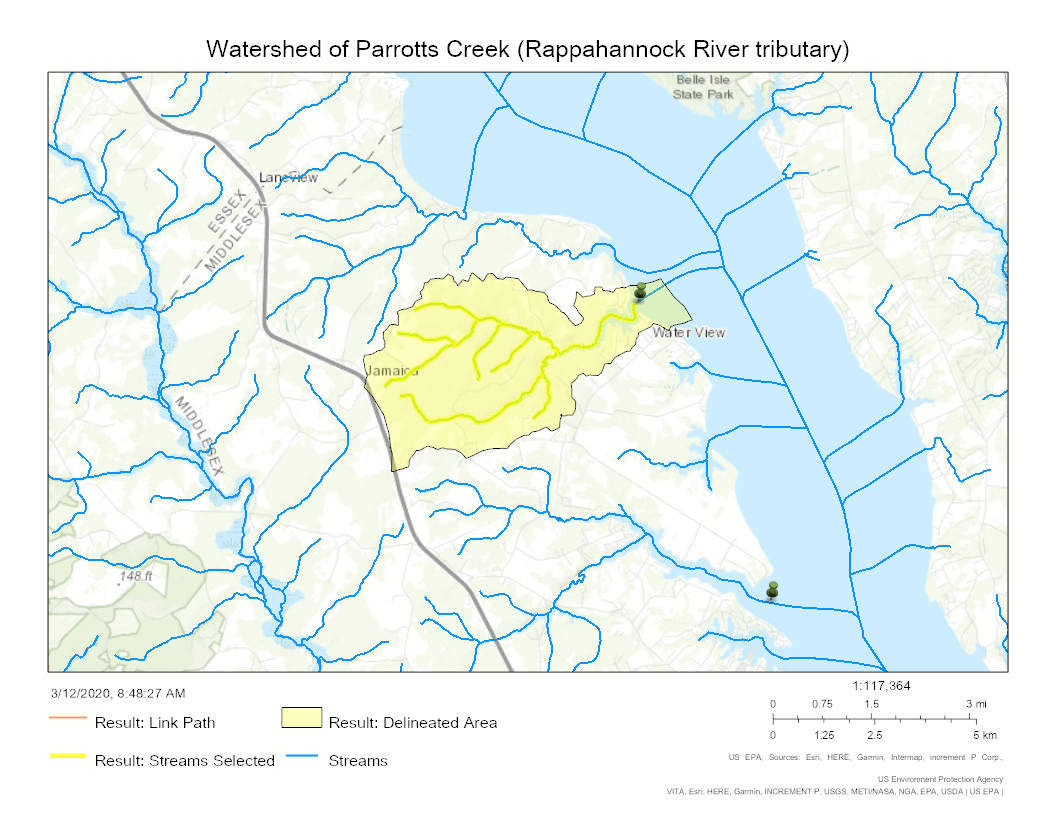
Watershed of Parrotts Creek (Rappahannock River tributary)

== See also ==
- List of rivers of Virginia
