= South Buffalo Creek =

Coordinates: 37.74013°N 79.57143°W

Location
- Country: United States

Physical characteristics
- Source
  - location: Virginia

South Buffalo Creek is a 9.9-mile-long (15.9 km) tributary of Buffalo Creek in Botetourt and Rockbridge counties in the U.S. state of Virginia. Via Buffalo Creek and the Maury River, it is part of the James River watershed.

== See also ==
- List of rivers of Virginia
