= North River (Slate River tributary) =

Coordinates: 37.57015°N 78.54806°W

Location
- Country: United States

Physical characteristics
- Source
  - location: Virginia

The North River is a 9.3-mile-long (15.0 km) tributary of the Slate River in Buckingham County in the U.S. state of Virginia. It is part of the James River watershed.

== See also ==
- List of rivers of Virginia
