= Bush River =

Bush River may refer to:

== Canada ==
- Bush River (British Columbia), a tributary of the Columbia River

== United States ==
- Bush River (Maryland), a tidal estuary
- Bush River (South Carolina), a tributary of the Saluda River
- Bush River (Virginia), a tributary of the Appomattox River

== See also ==
- River Bush, County Antrim, Northern Ireland
