= Sandy River (Bush River tributary) =

Coordinates: 37.29960°N 78.32527°W

Location
- Country: United States

Physical characteristics
- Source
  - location: Virginia

Sandy River is a 12.9-mile-long (20.8 km) tributary of the Bush River in the U.S. state of Virginia. Via the Bush River and the Appomattox River, it is part of the James River watershed. It rises in Prince Edward County northeast of the village of Green Bay and flow north through Prince Edward State Forest and farmland, joining the Bush River less than one mile south of that river's confluence with the Appomattox near the town of Farmville.

== See also ==
- List of rivers of Virginia
