= Middle Meherrin River =

Location
- Country: United States

Physical characteristics
- Source
  - location: Virginia
- Mouth: South Meherrin River
  - coordinates: 36.85044°N 78.33789°W

The Middle Meherrin River is a river in the United States state of Virginia.

== See also ==
- List of rivers of Virginia
