= Miry =

Miry may refer to:

== People ==
- Karel Miry (1823–1889) Belgian composer

== Places ==
- Miry Ridge, Smokey Mountains, Tennessee, USA; a ridgeline defining an edge of the watershed of the Little River (Tennessee)
- Rural Municipality of Miry Creek No. 229, Saskatchewan, Canada
- Miry Brook, Danbury, Connecticut, USA

=== Rivers ===
- Miry Branch, Delaware, USA; a brook, see List of rivers of Delaware
- Miry Creek, USA; a left tributary of the Dan River
- Miry Creek, Canada; a watercourse on the voyaging/portaging route to Fort Pelly, Saskatchewan
- Miry Gut, North Carolina, USA; a brook and tributary of the South River; see List of rivers of North Carolina
- Miry Run, New Jersey, USA; a brook and tributary of the Assunpink Creek
- Miry Wash, Utah, USA; a creek, see List of rivers of Utah

== See also ==
- Augustyn Mirys (1700–1790) Polish painter
- Miry Hole Branch, Jones County, North Carolina, USA; a first-order tributary of the Trent River
- Miry Creek Golf Course, Cabri, Saskatchewan, Canada; see List of golf courses in Saskatchewan
