= North Buffalo Creek =

River in Virginia

Coordinates: 37.74013°N 79.57171°W

Location
- Country: United States

Physical characteristics
- Source
  - location: Virginia

North Buffalo Creek is a 7.5-mile-long (12.1 km) tributary of Buffalo Creek in Rockbridge County in the U.S. state of Virginia. Via Buffalo Creek and the Maury River, it is part of the James River watershed.

== See also ==
- List of rivers of Virginia
