= Stave =

Stave may refer to:

== Music ==
- Stave (music), used in musical notation
- Stanza
- The Staves, an English folk rock trio

== People ==
- Bruce M. Stave (1937–2017), American historian
- Joel Stave (born 1992), American football quarterback

== Places ==
- Stave (Krupanj), a village in Serbia
- Stave Hill, in London
- Stave Lake, in British Columbia, Canada
- Stave River, in British Columbia, Canada
- Stave Run, a river in Virginia, United States

== Other uses ==
- Stave (wood), a length of wood used to form the sides of barrels, tanks, tubs, etc.
- Stave bearing
- Stave church, a type of Medieval wooden church
- Icelandic magical staves
- Stave Puzzles, an American jigsaw puzzle company

== See also ==
- Staff (disambiguation)
