= Covington River =

Coordinates: 38.66151°N 78.13444°W

Location
- Country: United States

Physical characteristics
- Source
  - location: Virginia

The Covington River is a 7.4-mile-long (11.9 km) river in the U.S. state of Virginia. The river rises at the eastern foot of the Blue Ridge Mountains in Rappahannock County and flows southeast to the Rush River just north of that river's confluence with the Thornton River. The river system flows via the Hazel River to the Rappahannock River, a tributary of Chesapeake Bay.

== See also ==
- List of rivers of Virginia
