= West Yeocomico River =

Coordinates: 38°1′38″N 76°33′44″W

Location
- Country: United States

Physical characteristics
- Source
  - location: Virginia

The West Yeocomico River is a 1.9-mile-long (3.1 km) tidal river in the U.S. state of Virginia. It is an arm of the Yeocomico River, itself a branch from the Potomac River.

== See also ==
- List of rivers of Virginia
