= Lagrange Creek (Rappahannock River tributary) =

Stream in Virginia, USA

Lagrange Creek Tributary to Rappahannock River
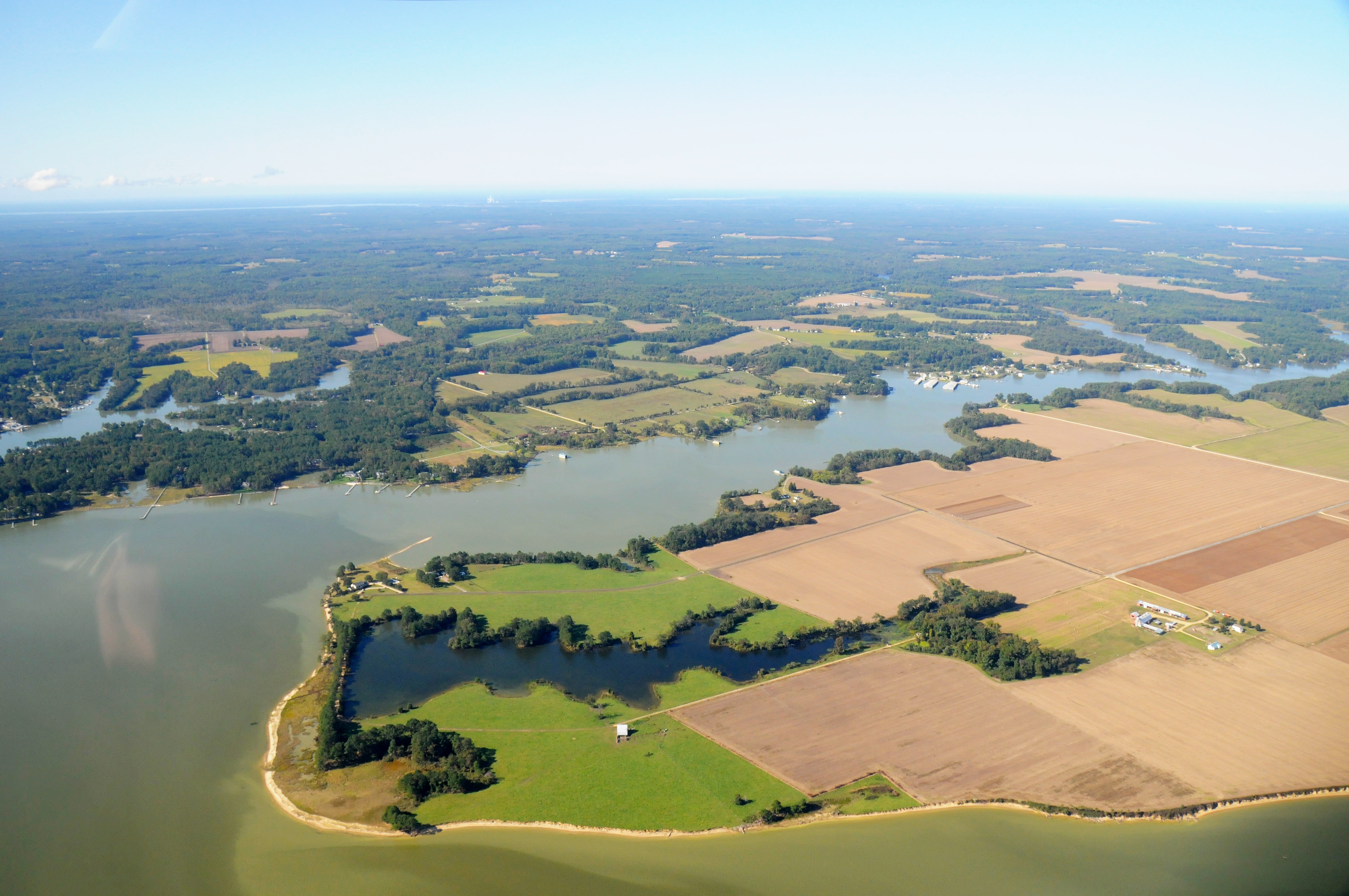
- Lagrange Creek near Urbanna, on the Rappahannock River, Virginia

- Location of Lagrange Creek mouth Lagrange Creek (Rappahannock River tributary) (the United States)

Location
- Country: United States
- State: Virginia
- County: Middlesex

Physical characteristics
- Source: Briery Swamp and Wyatt Swamp divide
  - location: about 2 miles southeast of Jamaica, Virginia
  - coordinates: 37°41′28″N 076°41′00″W
  - elevation: 70 ft (21 m)
- Mouth: Rappahannock River
  - location: Long Point, Virginia
  - coordinates: 37°40′08″N 076°35′13″W
  - elevation: 0 ft (0 m)
- Length: 6.51 mi (10.48 km)
- Basin size: 16.89 square miles (43.7 km^{2})
- Discharge
  - location: Rappahannock River
  - average: 19.02 cu ft/s (0.539 m^{3}/s) at mouth with Rappahannock River

Basin features
- Progression: southeast
- River system: Rappahannock River
- Tributaries
  - left: unnamed tributaries
  - right: South Branch Lagrange Creek
- Waterbodies: Burch Pond
- Bridges: Burchs Mill Road

Lagrange Creek is a 6.51 mi (10.48 km) long 3rd order tributary to the Rappahannock River in Middlesex County, Virginia.

== Variant names ==
According to the Geographic Names Information System, it has also been known historically as:

- La Grange Creek

In colonial times it was known as

- Burnham's Creek
- Sunderland Creek

== Course ==
Lagrange Creek rises on the Briery Swamp and Wyatt Swamp divide about 2 miles southeast of Jamaica, Virginia. Lagrange Creek then flows southeast to meet the Rappahannock River at Long Point, Virginia.

== Watershed ==
Lagrange Creek drains 16.89 square miles (43.7 km^{2}) of area, receives about 45.7 in/year of precipitation, has a topographic wetness index of 512.02 and is about 40.9% forested.

== Maps ==
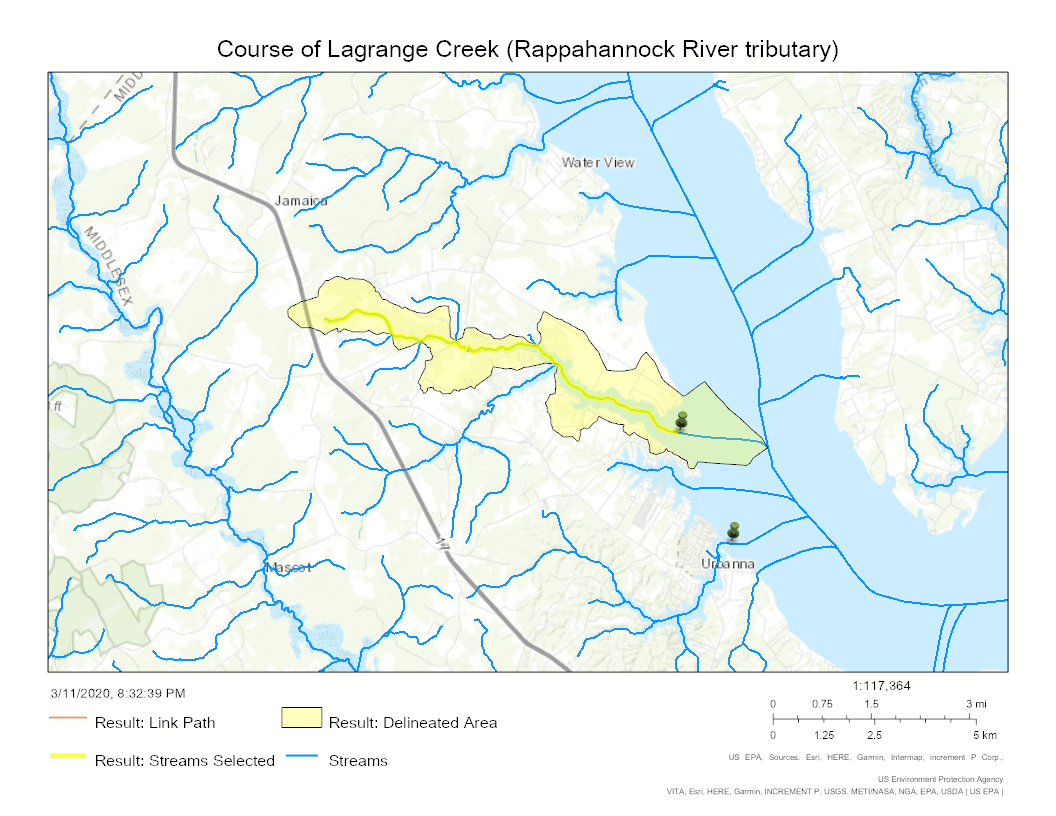
Course of Lagrange Creek (Rappahannock River tributary)

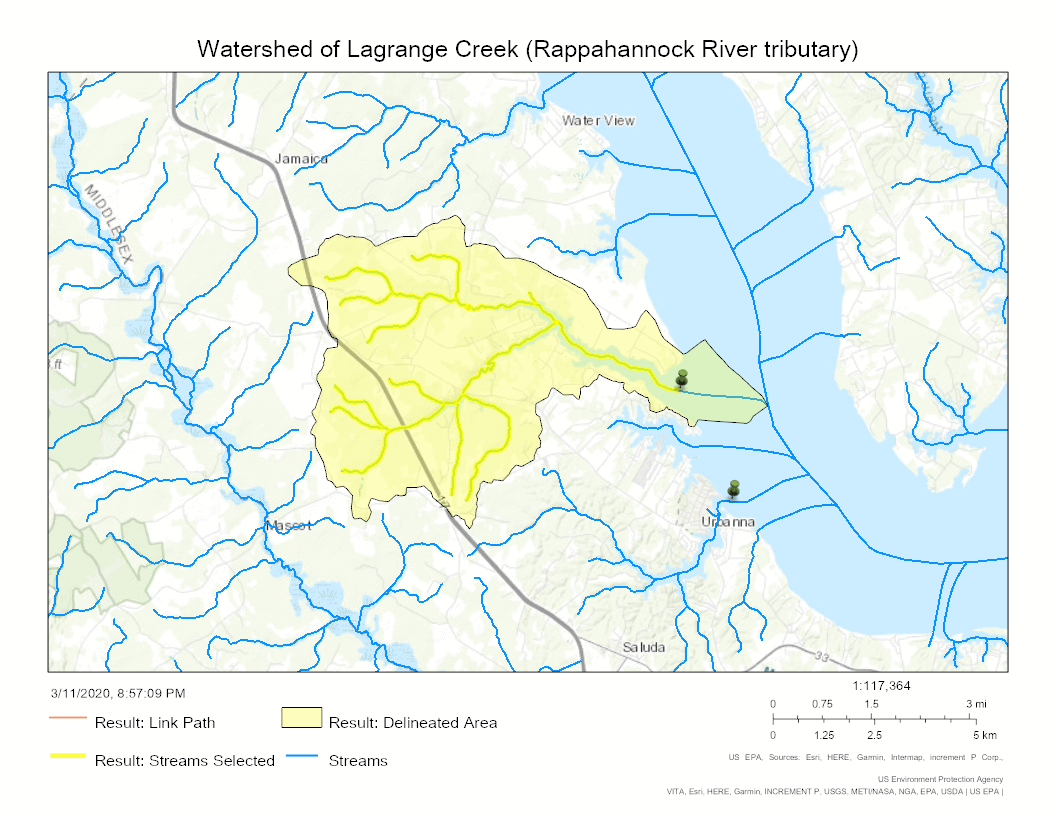
Watershed of Lagrange Creek (Rappahannock River tributary)

== See also ==
- List of rivers of Virginia
