= South Yeocomico River =

River in the United States of America

Coordinates: 38.03152°N 76.53996°W

Location
- Country: United States

Physical characteristics
- Source
  - location: Virginia

The South Yeocomico River is a 1.4-mile-long (2.3 km) tidal river in the U.S. state of Virginia. It is an arm of the Yeocomico River, itself an inlet from the Potomac River.

== See also ==
- List of rivers of Virginia
