= Northwest Yeocomico River =

Coordinates: 38.03152°N 76.53996°W

Location
- Country: United States

Physical characteristics
- Source
  - location: Virginia

The Northwest Yeocomico River is a 1.7-mile-long (2.7 km) tidal tributary of the Yeocomico River in the U.S. state of Virginia. The Yeocomico River system is a tidal branch of the Potomac River.

== See also ==
- List of rivers of Virginia
