= Stillwell Run =

Stream in Virginia, USA

Stillwell Run Tributary to Occoquan River
- Location of Stillwell Run mouth Stillwell Run (the United States)

Location
- Country: United States
- State: Virginia
- County: Fairfax

Physical characteristics
- Source: Wolf Run divide
  - location: about 0.25 miles south of Farrs Corner, Virginia
  - coordinates: 38°44′24″N 077°20′18″W
  - elevation: 260 ft (79 m)
- Mouth: Occoquan River
  - location: about 2.5 miles south-southwest of Makleys Corner, Virginia
  - coordinates: 38°43′32″N 077°21′05″W
  - elevation: 120 ft (37 m)
- Length: 1.46 mi (2.35 km)
- Basin size: 0.67 square miles (1.7 km^{2})
- Discharge
  - location: Occoquan River
  - average: 0.73 cu ft/s (0.021 m^{3}/s) at mouth with Occoquan River

Basin features
- Progression: southwest
- River system: Potomac River
- Tributaries
  - left: unnamed tributaries
  - right: unnamed tributaries
- Bridges: none

Stillwell Run is a 1.46 mi (2.35 km) long first-order tributary to the Occoquan River in Fairfax County, Virginia. This is the only stream of this name in the United States.

== Course ==
Stillwell Run rises on the Maple Branch divide and then flows southwesterly to join the Occoquan River about 2.5 miles south-southwest of Makleys Corners.

== Watershed ==
Stillwell Run drains 0.67 square miles (1.7 km^{2}) of area, receives about 43.4 in/year of precipitation, and is about 84.36% forested.

== See also ==
- List of rivers of Virginia
