= Dry River (Virginia) =

River in Virginia, United States of America

Coordinates: 38.39235°N 78.98059°W

Location
- Country: United States

Physical characteristics
- Source
  - location: Virginia

The Dry River is a 22.6-mile-long (36.4 km) tributary of the North River in the U.S. state of Virginia. It flows entirely within Rockingham County, rising within the George Washington National Forest east of the West Virginia border and flowing south to the North River at Bridgewater. Via the North River, it is part of the Shenandoah River system, flowing to the Potomac River.

== See also ==
- List of rivers of Virginia
