= Harris River =

Coordinates: 37.09320°N 76.30911°W

Location
- Country: United States

Physical characteristics
- Source
  - location: Virginia

The Harris River is a 2.5-mile-long (4.0 km) tidal river within the city of Hampton, Virginia, United States. It is a southerly arm of the Back River, an inlet of Chesapeake Bay.

== See also ==
- List of rivers of Virginia
