= Occupacia Creek =

River in Virginia, United States

Coordinates: 38°01′20″N 76°55′30″W

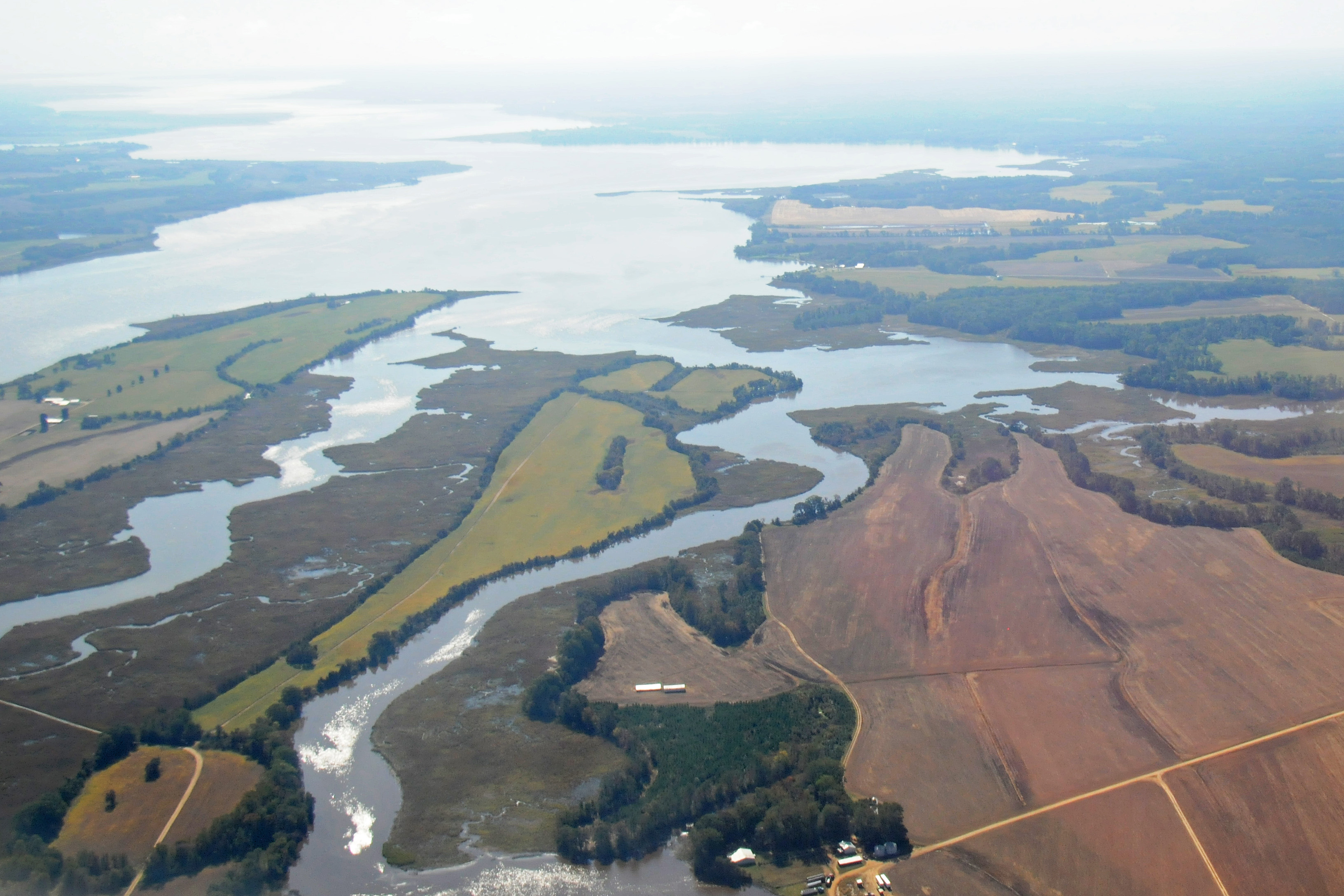
Aerial photograph of Occupacia Creek, c. 2011

Occupacia Creek is a tributary of the Rappahannock River in Essex County, Virginia. The drainage area of the creek is 29.3 square miles.

== See also ==
- List of rivers of Virginia
