= North Fork Clinch River =

Coordinates: 36°35′03″N 83°00′41″W

Location
- Country: United States

Physical characteristics
- Source
  - location: Lee County, Virginia
  - elevation: 2,240 ft (680 m)
- Mouth
  - location: Clinch River in Hancock County, Tennessee
  - elevation: 1,138 ft (347 m)

The North Fork Clinch River is a river in the U.S. states of Virginia and Tennessee. It rises along the slopes of Wallen Ridge in Lee County, Virginia, and empties into the Clinch River at Hancock County, Tennessee, just across the Tennessee/Virginia state line.

== See also ==
- List of rivers of Virginia
