= North Meherrin River =

Coordinates: 37°0′1″N 78°20′50″W

Location
- Country: United States

Physical characteristics
- Source
  - location: Virginia

The North Meherrin River is a river in the United States state of Virginia.

== See also ==
- List of rivers of Virginia
