= Little Falling River =

Coordinates: 37.2182016°N 78.8330668°W

Location
- Country: United States

Physical characteristics
- Source
  - location: Virginia

The Little Falling River is a river in the United States state of Virginia.

== See also ==
- List of rivers of Virginia
