= Browns Dan River =

Coordinates: 36°35′1″N 80°22′58″W

Location
- Country: United States

Physical characteristics
- Source
  - location: Virginia

The Browns Dan River is a river in the United States state of Virginia.

== See also ==
- List of rivers of Virginia
