= Perrin River =

Coordinates: 37.26486°N 76.42328°W

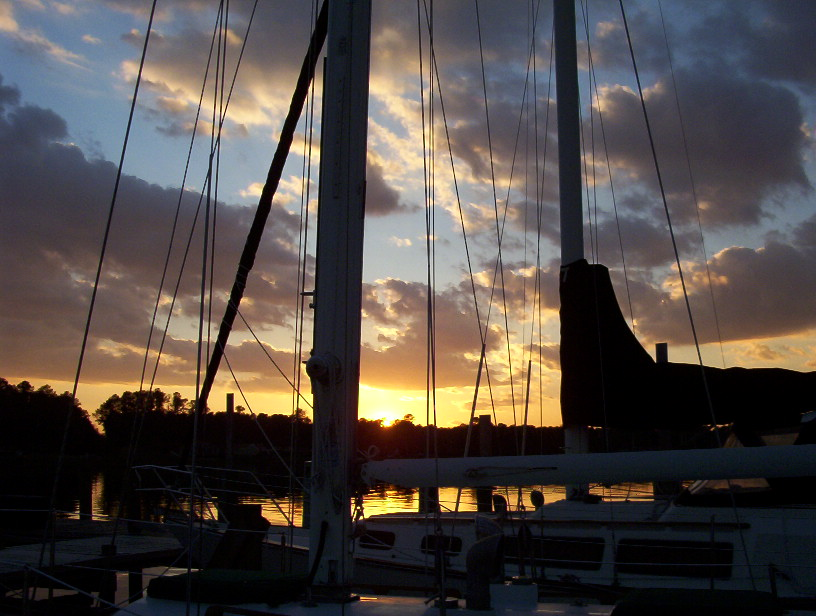
- View out on the Perrin River

Location
- Country: United States

Physical characteristics
- Source
  - location: Virginia

The Perrin River is a 1.3-mile-long (2.1 km) tidal river in the U.S. state of Virginia. It is a small inlet on the north shore of the York River near that river's mouth at Chesapeake Bay.

== See also ==
- List of rivers of Virginia
