= South Fork Mayo River =

Coordinates: 36°32′26.50″N 79°59′21.16″W

Location
- Country: United States

Physical characteristics
- Source
  - location: Virginia

The South Fork Mayo River is a river in the United States states of Virginia and North Carolina.

== See also ==
- List of rivers of Virginia
