= Massey Creek (Occoquan River tributary) =

Stream in Virginia, USA

Massey Creek Tributary to Occoquan River
- Location of Massey Creek mouth Massey Creek (Occoquan River tributary) (the United States)

Location
- Country: United States
- State: Virginia
- County: Fairfax

Physical characteristics
- Source: Confluence of South Branch Massey Creek and Giles Run
  - location: Harbor View, Virginia
  - coordinates: 38°40′9″N 077°13′15″W
  - elevation: 0 ft (0 m)
- Mouth: Occoquan River
  - location: about 1 mile east of Woodbridge, Virginia
  - coordinates: 38°39′31″N 077°13′32″W
  - elevation: 0 ft (0 m)
- Length: 0.94 mi (1.51 km)
- Basin size: 6.30 square miles (16.3 km^{2})
- Discharge
  - location: Occoquan River
  - average: 6.75 cu ft/s (0.191 m^{3}/s) at mouth with Occoquan River

Basin features
- Progression: southwest
- River system: Potomac River
- Tributaries
  - left: South Branch Massey Creek
  - right: Giles Run
- Bridges: none

Massey Creek is a 0.94 mi (1.51 km) long second-order tributary to the Occoquan River in Fairfax County, Virginia.

== Course ==
Massey Creek begins at the confluence of South Branch Massey Creek and Giles Run at Harbor View, Virginia and then flows southwesterly to join the Occoquan River about 1 mile east of Woodbridge, Virginia.

== Watershed ==
Massey Creek drains 6.30 square miles (16.3 km^{2}) of area, receives about 47.1 in/year of precipitation, and is about 24.64% forested.

== See also ==
- List of rivers of Virginia
