= North River (Mobjack Bay) =

Coordinates: 37°23′30″N 76°24′14″W

Location
- Country: United States

Physical characteristics
- Source
  - location: Virginia

The North River is a 7.6-mile-long (12.2 km) tidal river in the U.S. state of Virginia. It is an arm of Mobjack Bay, itself part of Chesapeake Bay. The North River forms the boundary between Mathews and Gloucester counties.

== See also ==
- List of rivers of Virginia
