= Kings Run (Ararat River tributary) =

Stream in Virginia, USA

Kings Run Tributary to Ararat River
- Location of Kings Run mouth Kings Run (Ararat River tributary) (the United States)

Location
- Country: United States
- State: Virginia
- County: Patrick

Physical characteristics
- Source: unnamed tributary to Pine Creek divide
  - location: about 0.1 miles southwest of Groundhog Mountain
  - coordinates: 36°38′29″N 080°31′54″W
  - elevation: 2,720 ft (830 m)
- Mouth: Ararat River
  - location: about 0.5 miles northwest of Ararat, Virginia
  - coordinates: 36°35′26″N 080°32′54″W
  - elevation: 1,275 ft (389 m)
- Length: 2.59 mi (4.17 km)
- Basin size: 1.47 square miles (3.8 km^{2})
- Discharge
  - location: Ararat River
  - average: 3.03 cu ft/s (0.086 m^{3}/s) at mouth with Ararat River

Basin features
- Progression: Ararat River → Yadkin River → Pee Dee River → Winyah Bay → Atlantic Ocean
- River system: Yadkin River
- Tributaries
  - left: unnamed tributaries
  - right: unnamed tributaries
- Bridges: Raven Rock Road, Spring Branch Road

Kings Run is a 2.59 mi (4.17 km) long 1st order tributary to the Ararat River in Patrick County, Virginia.

== Course ==
Kings Run rises on the divide of an unnamed tributary to Pine Creek in Patrick County about 0.1 miles southwest of Groundhog Mountain. Kings Run then flows south to join the Ararat River about 0.5 miles northwest of Ararat, Virginia.

== Watershed ==
Kings Run drains 1.47 square miles (3.8 km^{2}) of area, receives about 53.9 in/year of precipitation, has a wetness index of 296.44, and is about 70% forested.

== See also ==
- List of rivers of Virginia
