= Falling River =

Coordinates: 37°1′20.51″N 78°54′16.04″W

Location
- Country: United States

Physical characteristics
- Source
  - location: Virginia

The Falling River is a river in the United States state of Virginia. It rises in the northwest corner of the town of Appomattox, Virginia and flows southwest through the town of Spring Mills, Virginia and empties into the Roanoke River southeast of the town of Brookneal.

== See also ==
- List of rivers of Virginia
