= Roanoke Creek =

Coordinates: 36°52′49.51″N 78°41′45.01″W

Location
- Country: United States

Physical characteristics
- Source
  - location: Virginia

Roanoke Creek is a river in the United States state of Virginia.

== See also ==
- List of rivers of Virginia
