= Sandy River (Dan River tributary) =

Sandy River (Virginia)
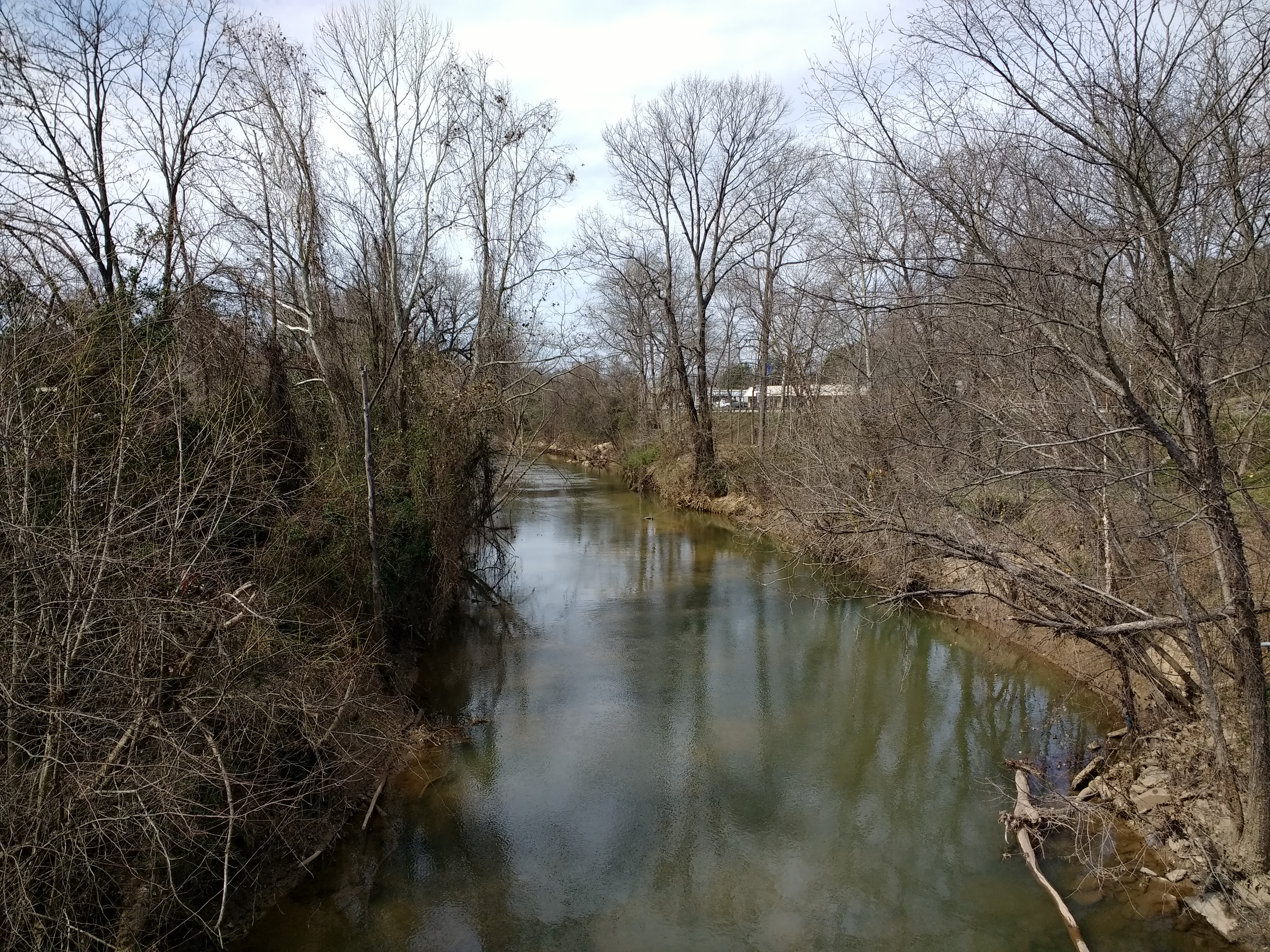

Location
- Country: United States

Physical characteristics
- Source
  - location: Virginia
- Mouth: Dan River
  - coordinates: 36.58726°N 79.41739°W

The Sandy River is a river in the U.S. state of Virginia.

== See also ==
- List of rivers of Virginia
