= Rowanty Creek =

Rowanty Creek Tributary to Nottoway River
- Location within Virginia

Location
- Country: United States
- State: Virginia
- County: Sussex; Prince George; Dinwiddie

Physical characteristics
- Source: confluence of Hatcher Run and Gravelly Run
  - location: about 4 miles east of Dinwiddie, Virginia
  - coordinates: 37°05′40″N 077°28′25″W
  - elevation: about 98 feet
- Mouth: confluence of Rowanty Creek and Nottoway River
  - location: about 2 miles northeast of Stony Creek, Virginia
  - coordinates: 36°58′17″N 077°20′46″W
  - elevation: 50 feet amsl
- Length: 22 km/14 miles

Basin features
- Progression: southeast
- River system: Nottoway River
- Tributaries
  - left: Hatcher Run; Picture Branch; Rocky Branch; Arthur Swamp; Warren Swamp
  - right: Gravelly Run; Little Cattail Creek; Health Meadows Branch; Fox Branch; Harvells Branch; Bolling Swamp; Galley Swamp
- Bridges: Dinwiddie County 669; Dinwiddie County 703; US 301; I-95; Sussex County 602

Rowanty Creek is a 14-mile long creek that is a tributary to the Nottoway River in southeastern Virginia. It is formed at the confluence of Hatcher Run and Gravelly Run.

== Course ==
Rowanty Creek flows southeast from its confluence source in a braided swamp. Along the way, it encounters a few constrictions that narrow the floodplain. A number of swamps are connected together near its mouth with the Nottoway River.

== Sources ==
The confluence of Hatcher Run and Gravelly Run mark the source of Rowanty Creek. Hatcher Run is about 7 km/4 miles in length and arises at an elevation of about 310 feet near Poole Siding, Virginia. Hatcher Run is impounded in two places, Jordon Lake and Speers Millpond. Gravelly Run at 17.5 km/11 miles is the longer of the two sources. It arises at an elevation of 280 feet and has one impoundment, Wilkinson Pond.

== Geology ==
Rowanty Creek flows its entire distance through Coastal Plain alluvium. However, the two runs that form the creek start in Petersburg Granite that is part of the Piedmont.

== See also ==
- List of rivers of Virginia
