= Walker Creek (Virginia) =

Coordinates: 37°19′1.44″N 80°40′45.24″W

Location
- Country: United States

Physical characteristics
- Source
  - location: Virginia

Walker Creek is a creek in Giles County in the United States state of Virginia.

== See also ==
- List of rivers of Virginia
