= Staunton River (Rapidan River tributary) =

Coordinates: 38.44374°N 78.36917°W

Location
- Country: United States

Physical characteristics
- Source
  - location: Virginia

The Staunton River is a 4.1-mile-long (6.6 km) stream in Madison County in the U.S. state of Virginia. Flowing entirely within Shenandoah National Park, it is a tributary of the Rapidan River and part of the Rappahannock River watershed.

== See also ==
- List of rivers of Virginia
