= Cranes Nest River =

Coordinates: 37.21205°N 82.37626°W

Location
- Country: United States

Physical characteristics
- Source
  - location: Dickenson County, Virginia

The Cranes Nest River is a 25.0-mile-long (40.2 km) river in the U.S. state of Virginia. It is located in Dickenson County in the southwestern part of the state. It is part of the Mississippi River watershed.

== See also ==
- List of rivers of Virginia
