= Fountains Creek =

Location
- Country: United States

Physical characteristics
- Source
  - coordinates: 36°34′29″N 77°43′59″W
- Mouth: Meherrin River
  - coordinates: 36°33′05″N 77°20′55″W

Fountains Creek, also known as Fontaine Creek, is a tributary of the Meherrin River in the U.S. state of Virginia. Formed by the confluence of Beddingfield Creek and Rattlesnake Creek in southwestern Greensville County, it flows into the Meherrin River near the Virginia–North Carolina border, about 1.2 miles (2 km) north of Margarettsville, North Carolina.

== See also ==
- List of rivers of Virginia
