= Motto River =

Coordinates: 38.05375°N 77.48526°W

Location
- Country: United States

Physical characteristics
- Source
  - location: Virginia

The Motto River is an 8.3-mile-long (13.4 km) river in Spotsylvania and Caroline counties in the U.S. state of Virginia. It is a tributary of the South River, and via the Mattaponi and York rivers is part of the Chesapeake Bay watershed.

== See also ==
- List of rivers of Virginia
