= Urbanna Creek =

Stream in Virginia, USA

Urbanna Creek Tributary to Rappahannock River
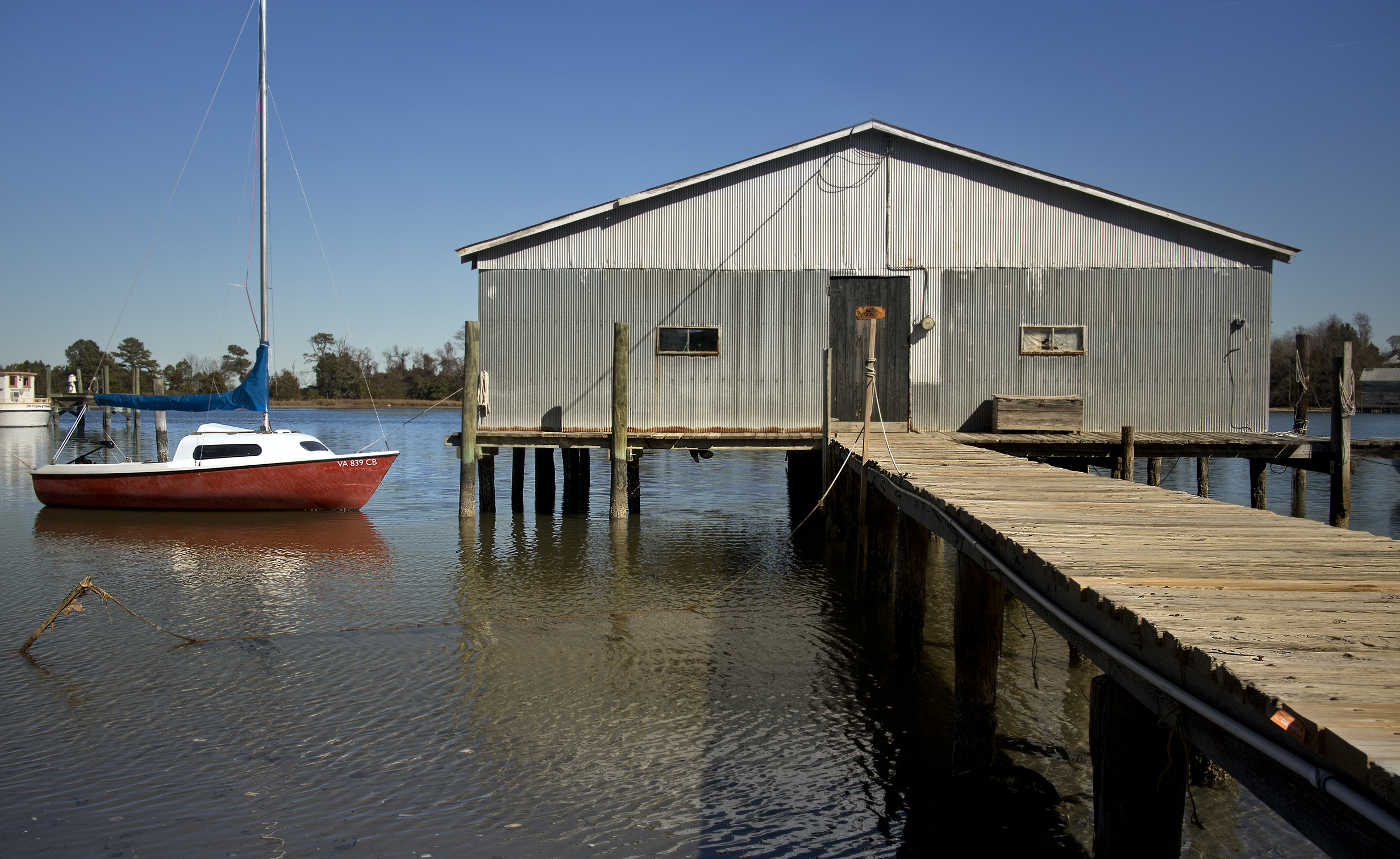
- Urbanna Creek in Urbanna, Virginia

- Location of Urbanna Creek mouth Urbanna Creek (the United States)

Location
- Country: United States
- State: Virginia
- County: Middlesex
- City: Urbanna

Physical characteristics
- Source: Dam at Town Bridge Pond
  - location: about 0.5 miles southwest of Urbanna, Virginia
  - coordinates: 37°38′06″N 076°35′57″W
  - elevation: 0 ft (0 m)
- Mouth: Rappahannock River
  - location: Urbanna, Virginia
  - coordinates: 37°38′30″N 076°34′04″W
  - elevation: 0 ft (0 m)
- Length: 3.52 mi (5.66 km)
- Basin size: 9.69 square miles (25.1 km^{2})
- Discharge
  - location: Rappahannock River
  - average: 10.94 cu ft/s (0.310 m^{3}/s) at mouth with Rappahannock River

Basin features
- Progression: Rappahannock River → Chesapeake Bay → Atlantic Ocean
- River system: Rappahannock River
- Tributaries
  - left: Town Bridge Swamp
  - right: Glebe Swamp
- Waterbodies: Town Bridge Pond
- Bridges: Town Bridge Road, Urbanna Road

Urbanna Creek is a 3.52 mi (5.66 km) long 3rd order tributary to the Rappahannock River in Middlesex County, Virginia. The stream is tidal is for its entire distance.

== Variant names ==
According to the Geographic Names Information System, it has also been known historically as:

- Nimcock Creek
- Urbana Creek

== Course ==
Urbanna Creek begins at the Town Bridge Pond dam about 0.5 miles southwest of Urbanna, Virginia. Urbanna Creek then flows southeast then northeast to meet the Rappahannock River at Urbanna, Virginia.

== Watershed ==
Urbanna Creek drains 9.69 square miles (25.1 km^{2}) of area, receives about 45.8 in/year of precipitation, has a topographic wetness index of 432.65 and is about 54.8% forested.

== Maps ==
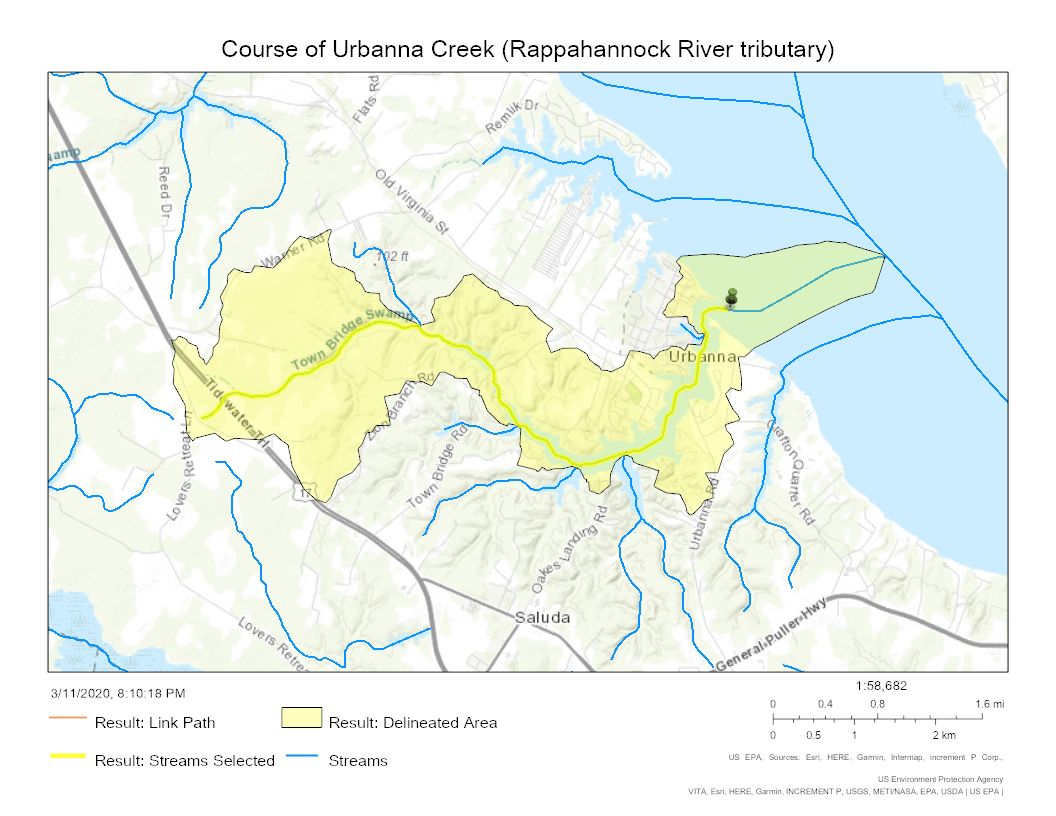
Course of Urbanna Creek (Rappahannock River tributary)

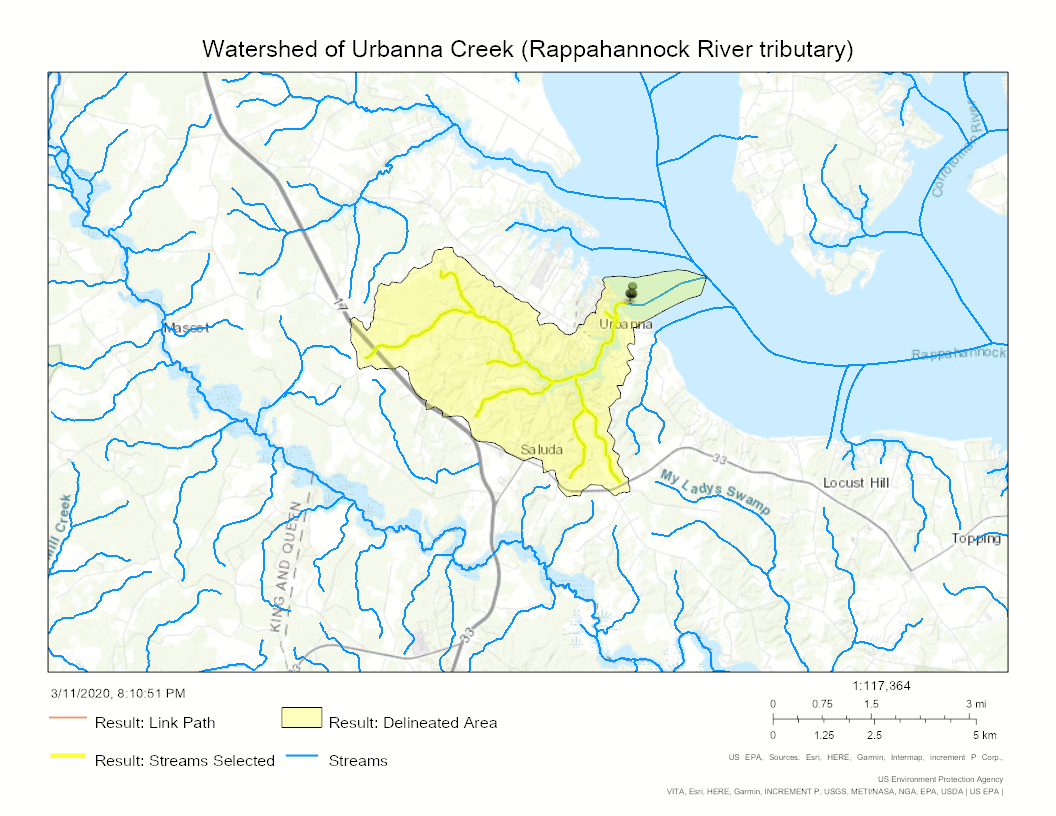
Watershed of Urbanna Creek (Rappahannock River tributary)

== See also ==
- List of rivers of Virginia
