= Piscataway Creek (Virginia) =

River in Virginia, USA

Coordinates: 37°54′12″N 76°49′21″W

Piscataway Creek is a tributary of the Rappahannock River in eastern Virginia, in the United States, approximately 17 miles (27 km) in length. It is fed by the Sturgeon Swamp and Mussel Swamp, lowlands near US Route 360 on the Middle Peninsula, and empties into the Rappahannock River three miles (5 km) downstream from the town of Tappahannock. It is tidal for much of its course.

The creek drains an area of 57.4 square miles (149 km^{2}). Its watershed is 63% forested. Agriculture encompasses 26.5 percent of the watershed, with 16.1 percent cropland and 10.4 pasture/hayland. The remainder consists of swampland and residential area.

== Description ==
Piscataway Creek follows a winding path through the central part of Essex county. It is navigable for about four miles (6 km) upstream from the Rappahannock river. The navigable portion extends just beyond the US Route 17 bridge. There are no aids to navigation.

In 1883, the United States government considered improving the navigability of the creek to serve the agricultural and foresting interests of the area. The channel was found to be narrow, but deep enough to support commercial vessels. The major inhibitor to commercial navigation was the bar extending across the northern portion of the mouth of the creek. It was ultimately decided that improved access was not worth the cost of dredging, and goods continued to be taken to Ware's Wharf via wagon.

The Tappahannock-Essex County Airport, opened in 2007, sits in the southern portion of the Piscataway's watershed.

== See also ==
- List of Virginia rivers
