= Reed Island Creek =

River in Virginia, United States

Coordinates: 36°56′2.44″N 80°44′58.25″W

Big Reed Island Creek is one of the largest tributaries of the New River (part of the Upper New Watershed) situated in the Blue Ridge Mountains Physiographic Province of the Appalachian Mountains. The main stem of the river flows for approximately 95.98 kilometers (~60 miles) from the headwater source at Hurricane Knob in Meadows of Dan, Virginia (elev. 944 m) and opens to the New River via Big Reed Junction near Hiwassee, Virginia (see Map 1). Several tributaries and a confluence of smaller streams flow through the region, adding over a hundred extra miles to the length of the watershed. The principal named tributaries to Big Reed are Bear Creek, Big Branch, Bobbitt Creek, Buckhorn Creek, Burks Fork, Grassy Creek, Greasy Creek, Little Snake Creek, Pine Creek, Snake Creek, Stone Mountain Creek, Sulphur Spring Branch. It covers approximately 110.5 km^{2} (27,318 acres) and crosses Pulaski, Floyd, and Carroll County, Virginia in the southwestern part of the state.

== Land Use ==
The 2030 Carroll County Plan has a lot of information regarding the land use and natural resources that influence the Big Reed Island Creek watershed. Most of the land in the area is rural with a gentle rolling landscape, and includes forests, agriculture and open space. Table 1 and Map 2 from the comprehensive plan highlights the acreage and percent of existing land use in the county. Over half (54.4%) of the existing land use in Carroll Co. is designated for agriculture while 16% is described as vacant or open space. Forested areas are the next most abundant land cover type with 11.5% of the existing land used for forestry.

Residential development is the single most intensive use of developed land in rural areas, and 11.4% of the existing land in Carroll County is used for either suburban residential, urban residential, or commercial development. The 2030 Carroll County Plan has a very low projected rate of growth for the county, but says that the greatest demand on the land in the coming decades will come from the residential sector.

Wetlands comprise 1.5% of the land in Carroll County, Virginia. Figure 1 on the next page shows the types of wetlands listed in the county and includes freshwater emergent wetlands, freshwater forested/shrub wetlands, freshwater ponds, and riverines and other. These areas filter and replenish groundwater, act as a flood buffer, provide and protect important habitats, and mitigate and prevent erosion.

== See also ==
- List of rivers of Virginia
