= Sandy Run (Occoquan River tributary) =

Stream in Virginia, USA

Sandy Run Tributary to Occoquan River
- Location of Sandy Run mouth Sandy Run (Occoquan River tributary) (the United States)

Location
- Country: United States
- State: Virginia
- County: Fairfax

Physical characteristics
- Source: Popes Head Creek divide
  - location: Butts Corner, Virginia
  - coordinates: 38°46′47″N 077°19′48″W
  - elevation: 120 ft (37 m)
- Mouth: Occoquan River in Occoquan Reservoir
  - location: about 3 miles northwest of Occoquan, Virginia
  - coordinates: 38°42′02″N 077°18′23″W
  - elevation: 400 ft (120 m)
- Length: 2.65 mi (4.26 km)
- Basin size: 8.29 square miles (21.5 km^{2})
- Discharge
  - location: Occoquan River
  - average: 9.01 cu ft/s (0.255 m^{3}/s) at mouth with Occoquan River

Basin features
- Progression: generally south
- River system: Potomac River
- Tributaries
  - left: unnamed tributaries
  - right: unnamed tributaries
- Bridges: Rutledge Drive (x2), Clifton Road, Henderson Road, Cathedral Forest Drive, Hampton Road

Sandy Run is a 2.65 mi (4.26 km) long second-order tributary to the Occoquan River in Fairfax County, Virginia.

== Course ==
Sandy Run rises on the Pope Head Creek divide and then flows south to join the Occoquan River about 3 miles northwest of Occoquan, Virginia.

== Watershed ==
Sandy Run drains 8.29 square miles (21.5 km^{2}) of area, receives about 43.5 in/year of precipitation, and is about 69.29% forested.

== See also ==
- List of rivers of Virginia
