= Big Otter River =

Coordinates: 37°7′58.51″N 79°15′7.08″W

Big Otter River (Virginia)

Location
- Country: United States

Physical characteristics
- Source
  - location: Virginia

The Big Otter River is a river in the United States state of Virginia.

== See also ==
- List of rivers of Virginia
