= Little Willis River =

Coordinates: 37.43237°N 78.36944°W

Location
- Country: United States

Physical characteristics
- Source
  - location: Virginia

The Little Willis River is a 15.5-mile-long (24.9 km) tributary of the Willis River in the U.S. state of Virginia. It is part of the James River watershed. It rises in Buckingham County and flows east into Cumberland County, joining the Willis River 9 miles (14 km) north of Farmville.

== See also ==
- List of rivers of Virginia
