= Goose Creek (Roanoke River tributary) =

Coordinates: 37°7′1.52″N 79°23′1.09″W

Location
- Country: United States

Physical characteristics
- Source
  - location: Virginia

Goose Creek is a river in the United States state of Virginia. It is a tributary of the Roanoke River.

== See also ==
- List of rivers of Virginia
