= Deep Creek (Appomattox River tributary) =

Coordinates: 37.30432°N 77.80666°W

Location
- Country: United States

Physical characteristics
- Source
  - location: Virginia
- Mouth
  - location: Appomattox River
- Length: 30.1 miles (48.4 km)

Deep Creek is a 30.1-mile-long (48.4 km) tributary of the Appomattox River in the U.S. state of Virginia. It rises in Nottoway County northwest of Crewe 0.5 miles (0.8 km) west of State Route 49 (Watsons Wood Rd) and flows northeast into Amelia County. SR 153 (Military Road), crosses Deep Creek 3.66 mi (5.89 km) southwest of the creek's mouth. Deep Creek joins the Appomattox River 23 miles (37 km) west of Petersburg.

== See also ==
- List of rivers of Virginia
