= Saint Marys River (Virginia) =

Coordinates: 37.92875°N 79.17475°W

Location
- Country: United States

Physical characteristics
- Source
  - location: Virginia

The Saint Marys River is an 8.4-mile-long (13.5 km) tributary of the South River in Augusta County in the U.S. state of Virginia. By the South and Maury rivers, it is part of the James River watershed.

The river flows through the Blue Ridge Mountains, rising north of the Blue Ridge Parkway near the highlands known as Big Levels, and flows west to the South River near the village of Steeles Tavern.

== See also ==
- List of rivers of Virginia
