= Terrell Branch (Hyco River tributary) =

Stream in Virginia, USA

Terrell Branch Tributary to Hyco River
- Location of Terrell Branch mouth Terrell Branch (Hyco River tributary) (the United States)

Location
- Country: United States
- State: Virginia
- County: Halifax

Physical characteristics
- Source: Grassy Creek divide
  - location: about 1.5 miles southwest of Omega, Virginia
  - coordinates: 36°39′10″N 078°49′42″W
  - elevation: 418 ft (127 m)
- Mouth: Hyco River
  - location: about 2.5 miles south of Omega, Virginia
  - coordinates: 36°38′21″N 078°48′39″W
  - elevation: 319 ft (97 m)
- Length: 1.51 mi (2.43 km)
- Basin size: 1.15 square miles (3.0 km^{2})
- Discharge
  - location: Hyco River
  - average: 1.54 cu ft/s (0.044 m^{3}/s) at mouth with Hyco River

Basin features
- Progression: southeast
- River system: Roanoke River
- Tributaries
  - left: unnamed tributaries
  - right: unnamed tributaries
- Bridges: none

Terrell Branch is a 1.51 mi (2.43 km) long 1st order tributary to the Hyco River in Halifax County, Virginia.

== Course ==
Terrell Branch rises about 1.5 miles south of Omega, Virginia, and then flows southeast to join the Hyco River about 2.5 miles south of Omega.

== Watershed ==
Terrell Branch drains 1.15 square miles (3.0 km^{2}) of area, receives about 45.7 in/year of precipitation, has a wetness index of 365.53, and is about 89% forested.

== See also ==
- List of rivers of Virginia
