= Three Creek =

Three Creek Tributary to Nottoway River
- Location within Virginia

Location
- Country: United States
- State: Virginia
- County: Greensville; Southampton; Sussex
- City: Emporia

Physical characteristics
- Source: Confluence of Tryall Creek and Cooks Branch
  - location: about 2 miles north of Pleasant Shade, Virginia
  - coordinates: 36°47′16″N 077°38′13″W
  - elevation: about 168 feet
- Mouth: confluence with the Nottoway River
  - location: about 1/2 mile west of Sebrell, Virginia
  - coordinates: 36°46′53″N 077°09′50″W
  - elevation: about 15 feet AMSL
- Length: 75.4 km/46.9 miles

Basin features
- Progression: roughly east
- River system: Nottoway River
- Tributaries
  - left: Cooks Branch; Reedy Branch; Cattail Creek; Uriah Branch; Browns Branch; Chatman Branch; Applewhite Swamp; Smith Swamp; Poplar Swamp; Hornet Swamp
  - right: Tryall Creek; Maclins Creek; Nicholson Creek; Angelico Creek
- Waterbodies: Slagles Lake
- Bridges: Greensville County Routes 605, 613, 619, 610, 617, I-95, US 301, Greensville County Route 616, Sussex County Route 611, Southampton County Routes 615, 659, 308, 609 (Crichton Bridge)

Three Creek is a nearly 47 mile (75.4 km) long tributary of the Nottoway River in southeastern Virginia in the United States.

== Course ==
Three Creek is formed at the confluence of Tryall Creek and Cooks Branch in Greensville County, Virginia. From the confluence, the creek flows east then south into Slagles Lake. After Slagles Lake it flows further south for about a mile and then flows roughly southeast and then northeast through swampland towards the Nottoway River. Three Creek forms the county boundary between Greensville and Sussex Counties for part of its course.

== Sources ==
Tryall Creek rises at about 290 feet AMSL near Pleasant Grove Church and flows northeast to meet Cooks Branch. Cooks Branch rises near Smoky Ordinary at about 315 feet AMSL and flows east then south to meet with Tryall Creek. Cooks Branch has one tributary called Kettlestick Branch, which joins from the left.

== Watershed ==
Three Creek drains a mostly forested watershed and contains a lot of swampland towards the Nottoway River. Agriculture makes a large amount of the rest of the area.

== River Modifications ==
Three Creek has one impoundment, Slagles Lake along its course. A number of the tributaries have their own impoundments.

== Geology ==
The confluence of Tryall Creek and Cooks Branch is in the Piedmont of Virginia in mafic and felsic metavolcanic rocks. Both tributaries arise in granite (Tryall Creek) or granite gneiss (Cooks Branch). Three Creek flows into the Coastal Plain in the Bacon Castle Formation and then for most of its length, especially the swampy areas it is in alluvium.

== See also ==
- List of rivers of Virginia
