= Pocaty River =

Coordinates: 36°40′40.54″N 76°4′11.75″W

Location
- Country: United States

Physical characteristics
- Source
  - location: Virginia

The Pocaty River is a river in the United States state of Virginia.

== See also ==
- List of rivers of Virginia
