= Buffalo Creek (Appomattox River tributary) =

Coordinates: 37.30876°N 78.39916°W

Location
- Country: United States

Physical characteristics
- Source
  - location: Virginia

Buffalo Creek is a 21.1-mile-long (34.0 km) tributary of the Appomattox River in the U.S. state of Virginia. Flowing entirely through Prince Edward County, it joins the Appomattox River at Farmville.

== See also ==
- List of rivers of Virginia

== Notes ==
- U.S. Geological Survey Geographic Names Information System: Buffalo Creek
- USGS Hydrologic Unit Map - State of Virginia (1974)
- Salmon, Emily J.; Edward D. C. Campbell, Jr. (1994). The Hornbook of Virginia History (4th ed.). Richmond, VA: Virginia Office of Graphic Communications. ISBN 0-88490-177-7.
