= Little River (North River tributary) =

Little River (North River)

Location
- Country: United States

Physical characteristics
- Source
  - location: Virginia

Two streams named Little River flow to the North River, a tributary of the South Fork Shenandoah River in the U.S. state of Virginia. Both rivers flow within the George Washington National Forest.

One rises on Shenandoah Mountain at the West Virginia–Virginia border and flows 2.5 miles (4.0 km) east to the North River. 38°24′3.45″N 79°17′0.14″W

The other, farther east, forms at the juncture of its north and south forks and flows a total of 4.8 miles (7.7 km) east, then south, to join the North River just upstream from North River Gap. 38°21′49.45″N 79°9′49.12″W

== See also ==
- List of rivers of Virginia
