= Peumansend Creek =

Stream in Caroline County, Virginia, U.S.

Coordinates: 38°6′9.51″N 77°14′35.38″W

Peumansend Creek is a stream in Caroline County, in the U.S. state of Virginia. It flows into Mills Creek, a tributary of Rappahannock River.

Peumansend Creek (Peuman's End) was named after Peuman, a pirate who was killed there by vigilantes.

== See also ==
- List of rivers of Virginia
