= Sun Run (Ararat River tributary) =

Stream in Virginia, USA

Sun Run Tributary to Ararat River
- Location of Sun Run mouth Sun Run (Ararat River tributary) (the United States)

Location
- Country: United States
- State: Virginia
- County: Patrick

Physical characteristics
- Source: Big Laurel Creek divide
  - location: about 0.25 miles east of Groundhog Mountain
  - coordinates: 36°38′42″N 080°31′19″W
  - elevation: 2,730 ft (830 m)
- Mouth: Ararat River
  - location: about 2 miles northwest of Carters Mill, Virginia
  - coordinates: 36°36′50″N 080°30′13″W
  - elevation: 1,365 ft (416 m)
- Length: 2.85 mi (4.59 km)
- Basin size: 1.80 square miles (4.7 km^{2})
- Discharge
  - location: Ararat River
  - average: 3.94 cu ft/s (0.112 m^{3}/s) at mouth with Ararat River

Basin features
- Progression: Ararat River → Yadkin River → Pee Dee River → Winyah Bay → Atlantic Ocean
- River system: Yadkin River
- Tributaries
  - left: unnamed tributaries
  - right: unnamed tributaries
- Bridges: Goosecreek Lane (x2), Raven Rock Road

Sun Run is a 2.85 mi (4.59 km) long 1st order tributary to the Ararat River in Patrick County, Virginia. This is the only stream in the United States with this name.

== Course ==
Sun Run rises on the Big Laurel Creek divide in Patrick County about 0.25 miles east of Groundhog Mountain. Sun Run then flows east then curves south to join the Ararat River about 2 miles northwest of Carters Mill, Virginia.

== Watershed ==
Sun Run drains 1.80 square miles (4.7 km^{2}) of area, receives about 54.3 in/year of precipitation, has a wetness index of 283.34, and is about 80% forested.

== See also ==
- List of rivers of Virginia
