= Cedar Run (Occoquan River tributary) =

Coordinates: 38.68817°N 77.48860°W

Location
- Country: United States

Physical characteristics
- Source
  - location: Virginia
- Mouth
  - location: Occoquan River
- Length: 37.5 mi (60.4 km)

Cedar Run is a 37.5-mile-long (60.4 km) tributary of the Occoquan River in the U.S. state of Virginia.

== See also ==
- List of rivers of Virginia
