= Newfound River (Virginia) =

Coordinates: 37.80986°N 77.49443°W

The Newfound River is a 22.1-mile-long (35.6 km) tributary of the South Anna River in east-central Virginia in the United States. Via the South Anna, Pamunkey and York rivers, it is part of the watershed of Chesapeake Bay.

The Newfound River rises in southeastern Louisa County and flows generally eastward through western Hanover County. It joins the South Anna about 4 miles (6 km) north of the town of Ashland.

== See also ==
- List of Virginia rivers
