= Little Dry River =

Coordinates: 38.66178°N 78.92281°W

Location
- Country: United States

Physical characteristics
- Source
  - location: Virginia

The Little Dry River is a 10.9-mile-long (17.5 km) tributary of the North Fork Shenandoah River in the U.S. state of Virginia. It rises in Rockingham County just east of the Virginia-West Virginia border near the crest of Shenandoah Mountain and flows east, joining the North Fork just west of the village of Fulks Run.

== See also ==
- List of rivers of Virginia
