= Shoemaker River =

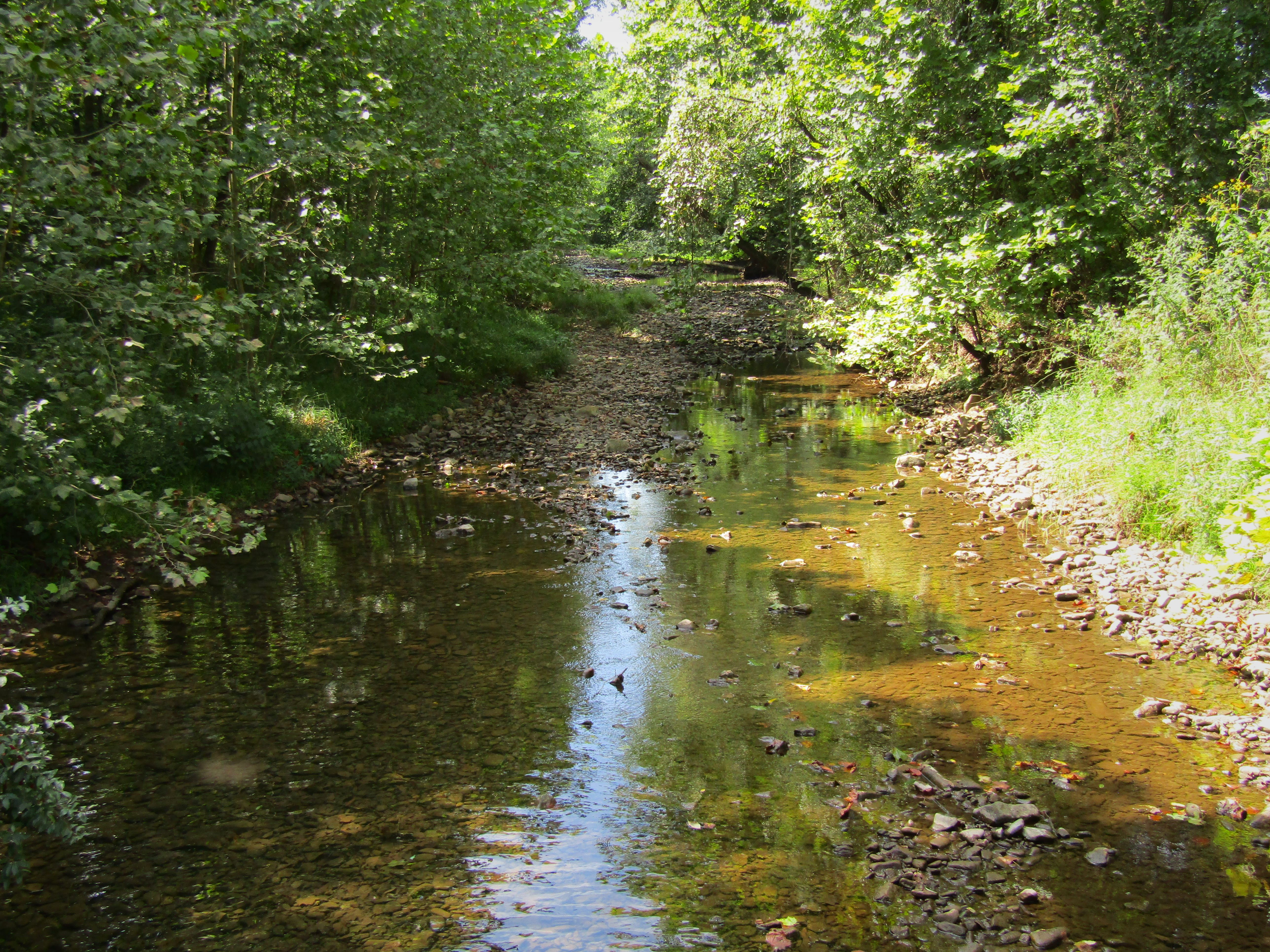

Location
- Country: United States

Physical characteristics
- Source
  - location: Long Run (1330 Feet), Hogpen Run, Slate Lick Branch, and Turner Run
- Mouth
  - coordinates: 38°38′21″N 78°53′16″W
  - elevation: 1,100 ft (340 m)
- Length: 11.6 mi (18.7 km)

The Shoemaker River is an 11.6-mile-long (18.7 km) river in the U.S. state of Virginia. It is a tributary of the North Fork Shenandoah River in Rockingham County, flowing along the western base of Little North Mountain. The river's elevation decreases about 230 feet from the source to the mouth.

== See also ==
- List of rivers of Virginia
