= Poropotank River =

Coordinates: 37.43931°N 76.70412°W

Location
- Country: United States

Physical characteristics
- Source
  - location: Virginia

The Poropotank River is a 16.0-mile-long (25.7 km) river in the U.S. state of Virginia. It is a tributary of the York River and forms part of the boundary between King and Queen and Gloucester counties.

== See also ==
- List of rivers of Virginia
