= Cabin Creek (Appomattox River tributary) =

Stream in Virginia, United States

Coordinates: 37.30682°N 77.32220°W

Location
- Country: United States

Physical characteristics
- Source
  - location: Virginia

Cabin Creek is a 4.8-mile-long (7.7 km) stream in the U.S. state of Virginia. It is a tributary of the Appomattox River. It rises in Fort Gregg-Adams and flows north into the western side of the city of Hopewell, reaching the Appomattox River 3 miles (5 km) upstream of that river's confluence with the James River.

== See also ==
- List of rivers of Virginia
