= Mountain Run (Rappahannock River tributary) =

Coordinates: 38°27′1.46″N 77°45′41.97″W

Mountain Run is a small tributary of the Rappahannock River, located in Virginia. It starts and ends within the borders of Culpeper County, emptying into the Rappahannock River, which makes up the northeastern board of the county. Two reservoirs, Mountain Run Lake and Lake Culpeper are fed by Mountain Run.

== See also ==
- List of rivers of Virginia
