= Doyles River =

Coordinates: 38.12763°N 78.65863°W

The Doyles River is a 10.1-mile-long (16.3 km) tributary of the Moormans River in central Virginia in the United States. Via the Moormans, Rivanna and James rivers, it is part of the watershed of Chesapeake Bay.

According to the Geographic Names Information System, the river has also been known as the Doyle River. The United States Board on Geographic Names settled on "Doyles River" as the stream's official name in 1933.

== Course ==
The Doyles River flows for its entire length in northwestern Albemarle County. It rises in Shenandoah National Park in the Blue Ridge Mountains and flows generally southward to its confluence with the Moormans River, about 11 miles (18 km) northwest of Charlottesville.

== See also ==
- List of Virginia rivers

== Sources ==
- DeLorme (2005). Virginia Atlas & Gazetteer. Yarmouth, Maine: DeLorme. ISBN 0-89933-326-5.
