= Hudson Branch (Hyco River tributary) =

Stream in Virginia, USA

Hudson Branch Tributary to Hyco River
- Location of Hudson Branch mouth Hudson Branch (Hyco River tributary) (the United States)

Location
- Country: United States
- State: Virginia
- County: Halifax

Physical characteristics
- Source: Grassy Creek divide
  - location: pond in Centerville, Virginia
  - coordinates: 36°38′36″N 078°51′27″W
  - elevation: 448 ft (137 m)
- Mouth: Hyco River
  - location: about 2.5 miles southeast of Centerville, Virginia
  - coordinates: 36°37′58″N 078°49′21″W
  - elevation: 320 ft (98 m)
- Length: 2.19 mi (3.52 km)
- Basin size: 2.12 square miles (5.5 km^{2})
- Discharge
  - location: Hyco River
  - average: 2.77 cu ft/s (0.078 m^{3}/s) at mouth with Hyco River

Basin features
- Progression: southeast
- River system: Roanoke River
- Tributaries
  - left: unnamed tributaries
  - right: unnamed tributaries
- Bridges: none

Hudson Branch is a 2.19 mi (3.52 km) long 2nd order tributary to the Hyco River in Halifax County, Virginia.

== Course ==
Hudson Branch rises in a pond in Centerville, Virginia, and then flows southeast to join the Hyco River about 2.5 miles southeast of Centerville.

== Watershed ==
Hudson Branch drains 2.12 square miles (5.5 km^{2}) of area, receives about 45.7 in/year of precipitation, has a wetness index of 384.85, and is about 67% forested.

== See also ==
- List of rivers of Virginia
