= Grays Creek (Virginia) =

Coordinates: 37.192032°N 76.800861°W

Grays' Creek

Location
- Country: United States

Physical characteristics
- Source
  - location: Virginia
- Mouth
  - location: James River

Grays Creek is an 6.02-mile-long (9.69 km) stream in the U.S. state of Virginia. It is a tributary of the James River, rising south of State Route 626 and flowing east to reach the James River southwest of Historic Jamestowne, across the river.

== See also ==
- List of rivers of Virginia
