= Little River (North Anna River tributary) =

Coordinates: 37.82542°N 77.42582°W

Location
- Country: United States

Physical characteristics
- Source
  - location: Virginia

The Little River is a 44.7-mile-long (71.9 km) river located in Louisa and Hanover counties in the U.S. state of Virginia. It is a tributary of the North Anna River, and through the North Anna, Pamunkey, and York rivers, forms part the Chesapeake Bay watershed.

== See also ==
- List of rivers of Virginia
