= Little Dan River =

Coordinates: 36°32′16.49″N 80°22′43.21″W

Location
- Country: United States

Physical characteristics
- Source
  - location: Virginia

The Little Dan River is a river in the United States states of Virginia and North Carolina.

== See also ==
- List of rivers of Virginia
