= Indian River (Virginia) =

River located in Chesapeake, Virginia, United States

Coordinates: 36°50′2″N 76°12′40″W

Location
- Country: United States

Physical characteristics
- Source
  - location: Virginia

The Indian River is a 4.8-mile-long (7.7 km), primarily tidal river located entirely within the city of Chesapeake, Virginia, in the United States. It is a tributary of the Eastern Branch Elizabeth River, leading to the harbor of Hampton Roads.

== See also ==
- List of rivers of Virginia
