= Pedlar River =

Coordinates: 37.50986°N 79.26808°W

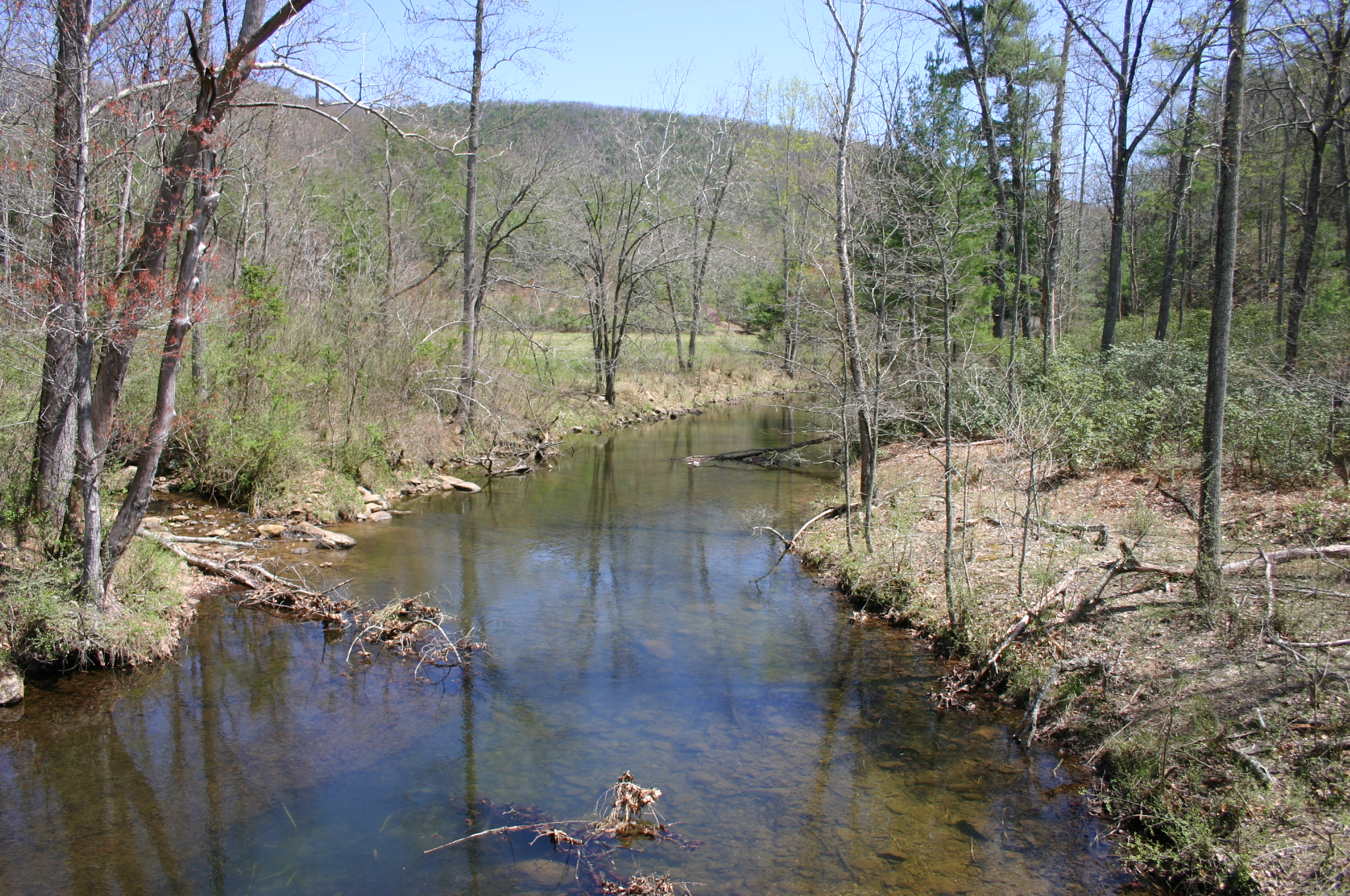
The Pedlar River as viewed from the Appalachian Trail

The Pedlar River is a 33.9-mile-long (54.6 km) tributary of the James River in west-central Virginia in the United States. Via the James River, it is part of the watershed of Chesapeake Bay.

The Pedlar River flows for its entire length in western Amherst County. It rises in the Blue Ridge Mountains and flows generally southwardly to its confluence with the James River about 9 miles (14 km) northwest of Lynchburg.

== See also ==
- List of Virginia rivers
