= Little River (Clinch River tributary) =

Coordinates: 37°00′06″N 81°55′34″W

Little River (Clinch River)

Location
- Country: United States

Physical characteristics
- Source
  - location: near Maiden Spring, Virginia
  - elevation: 2,270 ft (690 m)
- Mouth
  - location: Clinch River in Russell County, Virginia
  - elevation: 1,827 ft (557 m)

The Little River is a river in the U.S. state of Virginia. It rises near Maiden Spring in Tazewell County, Virginia, and empties into the Clinch River in Russell County.

== See also ==
- List of rivers of Virginia
