= Machipongo River =

River in Virginia, United States

Coordinates: 37°33′17″N 75°47′54″W

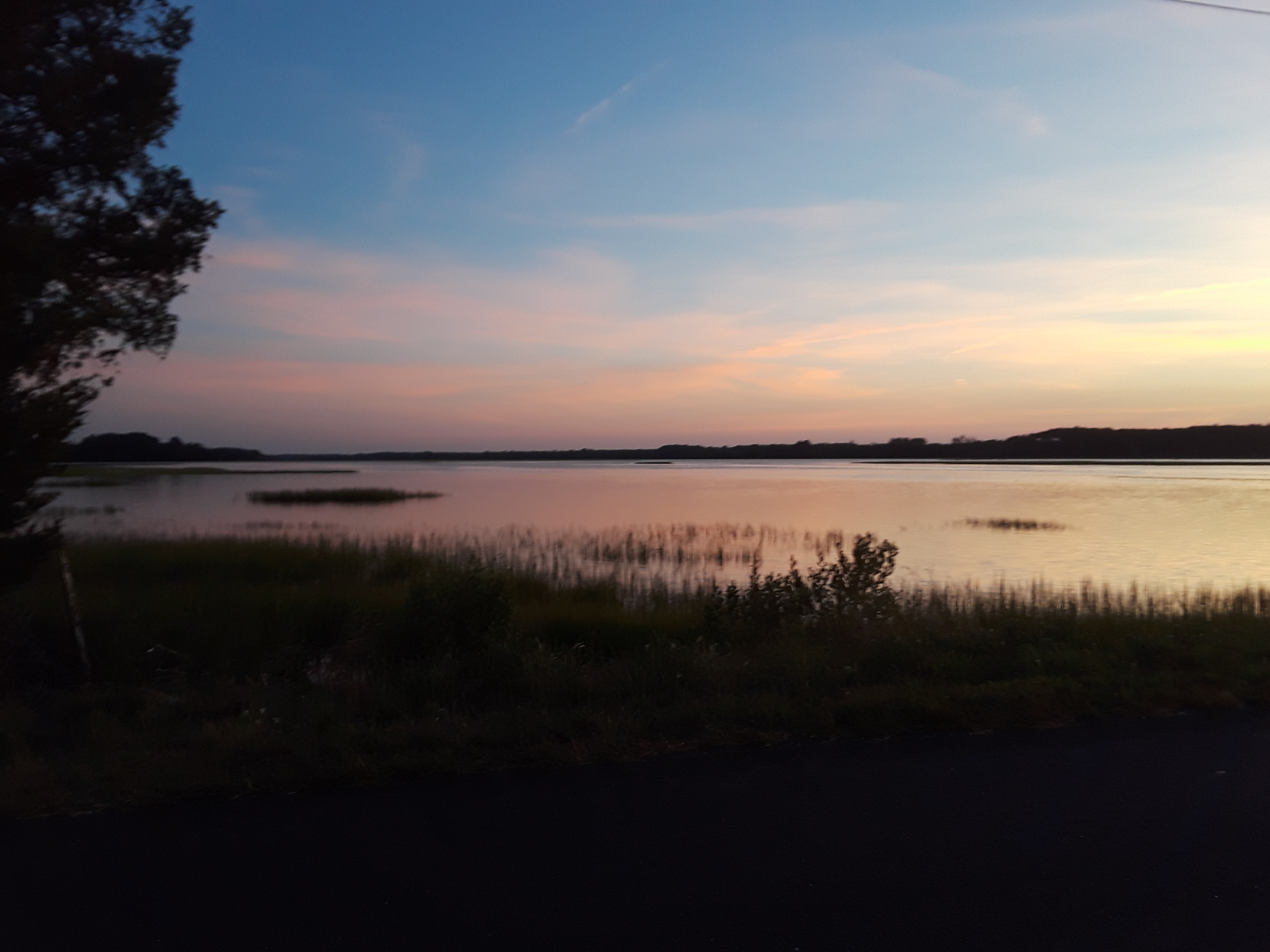
- Sunset along the Machipongo, July 2018

Location
- Country: United States

Physical characteristics
- Source
  - location: Virginia

The Machipongo River is a 16.5-mile-long (26.6 km) river in Accomack County on the Eastern Shore of the U.S. state of Virginia.

== See also ==
- List of rivers of Virginia
