= Wolf Creek (New River tributary) =

Location
- Country: United States

Physical characteristics
- Source
  - location: Virginia
- Mouth: New River
  - coordinates: 37.33468°N 80.81008°W

Wolf Creek is a creek in the United States state of Virginia. It is a tributary of the New River. It joins the New River in Narrows, Giles County.

== See also ==
- List of rivers of Virginia
