= Thompson Creek (Ararat River tributary) =

Stream in Virginia, US

Thompson Creek Tributary to Ararat River
- Location of Thompson Creek mouth Thompson Creek (Ararat River tributary) (the United States)

Location
- Country: United States
- State: Virginia
- County: Patrick

Physical characteristics
- Source: Pine Creek divide
  - location: about 1 mile southwest of Bell Spur, Virginia
  - coordinates: 36°39′05″N 080°29′35″W
  - elevation: 2,600 ft (790 m)
- Mouth: Ararat River
  - location: about 0.5 miles west of Belair Springs, Virginia
  - coordinates: 36°37′44″N 080°29′21″W
  - elevation: 1,520 ft (460 m)
- Length: 2.31 mi (3.72 km)
- Basin size: 1.44 square miles (3.7 km^{2})
- Discharge
  - location: Ararat River
  - average: 3.43 cu ft/s (0.097 m^{3}/s) at mouth with Ararat River

Basin features
- Progression: Ararat River → Yadkin River → Pee Dee River → Winyah Bay → Atlantic Ocean
- River system: Yadkin River
- Tributaries
  - left: unnamed tributaries
  - right: unnamed tributaries
- Bridges: Jar Gap Lane (x3)

Thompson Creek is a 2.31 mi (3.72 km) long 1st order tributary to the Ararat River in Patrick County, Virginia.

== Course ==
Thompson Creek rises on the Pine Creek divide in Patrick County about 1 mile southwest of Bell Spur, Virginia. Thompson Creek then flows west and makes a turn south to join the Ararat River about 0.5 miles west of Bell Spur.

== Watershed ==
Thompson Creek drains 1.44 square miles (3.7 km^{2}) of area, receives about 55.8 in/year of precipitation, has a wetness index of 258.12, and is about 76% forested.

== See also ==
- List of rivers of Virginia
