= Knotts Creek =

Coordinates: 36°52′53″N 76°27′27″W

Location
- Country: United States

Physical characteristics
- Source
  - location: Virginia

Knotts Creek is a 3.0-mile-long (4.8 km) tidal inlet on the south shore of the Nansemond River in the city of Suffolk, Virginia, in the United States.

== See also ==
- List of rivers of Virginia
