= Cub Creek (Roanoke River tributary) =

Coordinates: 36°59′57.52″N 78°45′35.02″W

Location
- Country: United States

Physical characteristics
- Source
  - location: Virginia

Cub Creek is a river in the United States state of Virginia. It is a tributary of the Roanoke River.

== See also ==
- List of rivers of Virginia
