= Little Otter River (Virginia) =

Coordinates: 37.355632°N 79.534355°W

Location
- Country: United States

Physical characteristics
- Source
  - location: Virginia

The Little Otter River is a river in Bedford County in the U.S. state of Virginia.

== See also ==
- List of rivers of Virginia
