= Moormans River =

Coordinates: 38.13763°N 78.55140°W

The Moormans River is a 14.3-mile-long (23.0 km) tributary of the South Fork of the Rivanna River in central Virginia in the United States. Via the Rivanna and James rivers, it is part of the watershed of Chesapeake Bay.

According to the Geographic Names Information System, the river has also been known as the Moorman's River. The United States Board on Geographic Names settled on "Moormans River" as the stream's official name in 1933. The river was named for Charles Moorman, who in 1735 patented 400 acres (1.6 km^{2}) of land in what was then Goochland County, at the junction of the Mechum and (now) Moorman rivers.

== Course ==
The Moormans River flows for its entire length in northwestern Albemarle County. It rises in the Blue Ridge Mountains as two streams, its north and south forks, which flow through Shenandoah National Park. Below their confluence in a small reservoir serving Charlottesville, the river flows generally eastwardly. It joins the Mechums River to form the South Fork of the Rivanna River about 7 miles (11 km) northwest of Charlottesville.

The river's largest tributary is the Doyles River.

== See also ==
- List of Virginia rivers

== Sources ==
- DeLorme (2005). Virginia Atlas & Gazetteer. Yarmouth, Maine: DeLorme. ISBN 0-89933-326-5.
