= Grogen Branch =

Stream in Virginia, USA

Grogen Branch Tributary to Ararat River
- Location of Grogen Branch mouth Grogen Branch (the United States)

Location
- Country: United States
- State: Virginia
- County: Patrick

Physical characteristics
- Source: south slope of Groundhog Mountain
  - location: about 3 miles south-southwest of Groundhog Mountain
  - coordinates: 36°37′45″N 080°32′02″W
  - elevation: 1,840 ft (560 m)
- Mouth: Ararat River
  - location: about 1 mile northwest of Ararat, Virginia
  - coordinates: 36°36′17″N 080°32′02″W
  - elevation: 1,258 ft (383 m)
- Length: 1.70 mi (2.74 km)
- Basin size: 0.58 square miles (1.5 km^{2})
- Discharge
  - location: Ararat River
  - average: 1.13 cu ft/s (0.032 m^{3}/s) at mouth with Ararat River

Basin features
- Progression: Ararat River → Yadkin River → Pee Dee River → Winyah Bay → Atlantic Ocean
- River system: Yadkin River
- Tributaries
  - left: unnamed tributaries
  - right: unnamed tributaries
- Bridges: Doe Run Road

Grogen Branch is a 1.70 mi (2.74 km) long 1st order tributary to the Ararat River in Patrick County, Virginia. This is the only stream of this name in the United States.

== Course ==
Grogen Branch rises on the south slope of Groundhog Mountain in Patrick County about 3 miles south-southwest of the peak of Groundhog Mountain. Grogen Branch then flows south to join the Ararat River about 1 mile northwest of Ararat, Virginia.

== Watershed ==
Grogen Branch drains 0.58 square miles (1.5 km^{2}) of area, receives about 51.3 in/year of precipitation, has a wetness index of 308.29, and is about 71% forested.

== See also ==
- List of rivers of Virginia
