= South River (Maury River tributary) =

Coordinates: 37.76736°N 79.38393°W

Location
- Country: United States

Physical characteristics
- Source
  - location: Virginia

The South River is a 20.3-mile-long (32.7 km) tributary of the Maury River in the U.S. state of Virginia. It is part of the James River watershed.

It rises southwest of Lofton in Augusta County, Virginia, near the western base of the Blue Ridge Mountains, and quickly receives the Saint Marys River coming out of the mountains from the east. Entering Rockbridge County near the village of Vesuvius, the South River continues to flow southwest and joins the Maury River between Lexington and Buena Vista.

== See also ==
- List of rivers of Virginia
