= Tear Wallet Creek =

Stream in Cumberland County, Virginia, U.S.

Coordinates: 37.467°N 78.231°W

Tear Wallet Creek is a stream in Cumberland County, Virginia, in the United States.

Tear Wallet Creek was so named when a man's wallet was torn by hogs.

== See also ==
- List of rivers of Virginia
