= Bailey Creek (Hopewell, Virginia) =

Coordinates: 37.40765°N 77.30359°W

Location
- Country: United States

Physical characteristics
- Source
  - location: Virginia
- Mouth
  - location: James River

Bailey Creek is an 8.6-mile-long (13.8 km) stream in the U.S. state of Virginia. It is a tributary of the James River, rising in Fort Gregg-Adams east of Petersburg and flowing northeast past the city of Hopewell to reach the James River 2 miles (3 km) southeast of the mouth of the Appomattox River.

== See also ==
- List of rivers of Virginia
