= Hull Creek (Potomac River tributary) =

Coordinates: 37°57′18.07″N 76°23′8.30″W

Location
- Country: United States
- State: Virginia
- County: Northumberland County

Physical characteristics
- Mouth
  - location: Potomac River
  - elevation: 0 feet (0 m)
- Length: 6.5 mi (10.5 km)

Hull Creek is a 6.5-mile-long (10.5 km) tributary of the tidal portion of the Potomac River in Northumberland County in Virginia's Northern Neck.

== See also ==
- List of Virginia rivers
