= Jordan River (Virginia) =

US geological feature

Coordinates: 38°45′36″N 78°1′41″W

The Jordan River is a 12.5-mile-long (20.1 km) headwater tributary of the Rappahannock River in northern Virginia in the United States. It rises in Shenandoah National Park and flows for its entire length in northern Rappahannock County. The river generally flows eastward and joins the Rappahannock River from the west. It is part of the watershed of Chesapeake Bay, via the Rappahannock.

== See also ==
- List of Virginia rivers
