= Little Piney River =

Coordinates: 37.73125°N 79.06947°W

Location
- Country: United States

Physical characteristics
- Source
  - location: Virginia

The Little Piney River is a 7.6-mile-long (12.2 km) tributary of the Piney River in Amherst County in the U.S. state of Virginia. Via the Piney and Tye rivers, it is part of the James River watershed.

The Little Piney River runs from the George Washington Forest, down Page Mountain, and feeds into the Big Piney River at the foot of the mountain. Both Piney Rivers straddle the boundaries of Nelson County and Amherst County.

== See also ==
- List of rivers of Virginia
- Amherst County, Virginia
- Nelson County, Virginia
