= Piney River (Thornton River tributary) =

Coordinates: 38.67818°N 78.23306°W

Location
- Country: United States

Physical characteristics
- Source
  - location: Virginia

The Piney River is an 8.3-mile-long (13.4 km) river in the U.S. state of Virginia. Rising in the northern part of Shenandoah National Park, it is a tributary of the Thornton River, and via the Hazel and Rappahannock rivers is part of the Chesapeake Bay watershed.

== See also ==
- List of rivers of Virginia
