= Rush River (Virginia) =

Coordinates: 38.65429°N 78.13055°W

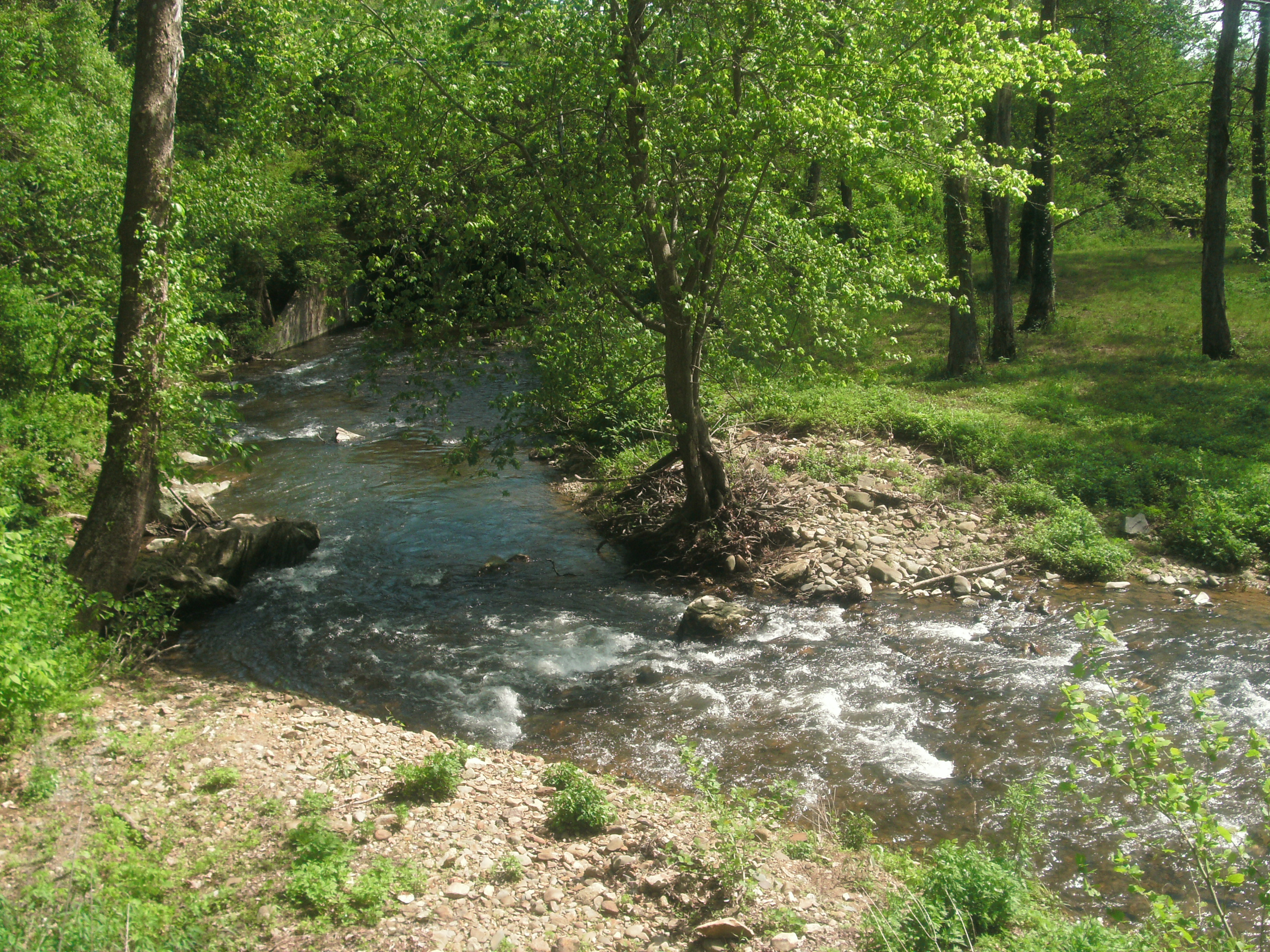
- The Rush River near the Calvert Mill in Washington, Virginia

Location
- Country: United States

Physical characteristics
- Source
  - location: Virginia

The Rush River is a 12.5-mile-long (20.1 km) river in the U.S. state of Virginia. It rises in the northern part of Shenandoah National Park and flows southeast to the Thornton River at Rock Mills. Via the Thornton and Hazel rivers, it is part of the Rappahannock River watershed.

== See also ==
- List of rivers of Virginia
