= Stave Run =

Stream in Fairfax County, Virginia, U.S.

Coordinates: 38°57′8.40″N 77°22′28.95″W

Stave Run is a stream in Fairfax County, Virginia, in the United States. It was formerly called Whiskey Barrel Run.

Stave Run was so named on account of staves for barrels being made nearby.

== See also ==
- List of rivers of Virginia
