= Miry Creek (Dan River tributary) =

Stream in Virginia, USA

Miry Creek Tributary to Dan River
- Location of Miry Creek mouth Miry Creek (Dan River tributary) (the United States)

Location
- Country: United States
- State: Virginia
- County: Halifax

Physical characteristics
- Source: unnamed tributary to Polecat Creek divide
  - location: pond about 2.5 miles east of Vernon Hill, Virginia
  - coordinates: 36°45′35″N 079°02′54″W
  - elevation: 545 ft (166 m)
- Mouth
  - location: about 3 miles west-southwest of South Boston, Virginia
  - coordinates: 36°41′11″N 078°58′24″W
  - elevation: 328 ft (100 m)
- Length: 9.55 mi (15.37 km)
- Basin size: 29.03 square miles (75.2 km^{2})
- Discharge
  - location: Dan River
  - average: 34.23 cu ft/s (0.969 m^{3}/s) at mouth with Dan River

Basin features
- Progression: Dan River → Roanoke River → Albemarle Sound → Pamlico Sound → Atlantic Ocean
- River system: Roanoke River
- Tributaries
  - left: Ballous Creek; Mikes Creek
  - right: unnamed tributaries
- Bridges: Deer Run Road, Jones Ferry Road, Union Church Road, River Road

Miry Creek is a 9.55 mi (15.37 km) long 4th order tributary to the Dan River in Halifax County, Virginia.

== Course ==
Miry Creek rises in a pond about 2.5 miles east of Vernon Hill, Virginia, and then flows generally southeast to join the Dan River about 3 miles west-southwest of South Boston.

== Watershed ==
Miry Creek drains 29.03 square miles (75.2 km^{2}) of area, receives about 45.5 in/year of precipitation, has a wetness index of 393.93, and is about 54% forested.

== See also ==
- List of Virginia Rivers
