= Totuskey Creek =

River in Virginia, United States

Coordinates: 37°52′29″N 76°44′48″W

- Location within Virginia Location within the United States

Location
- Country: United States
- State: Virginia
- County: Richmond County

Physical characteristics
- Mouth: Rappahannock River
  - location: Wellford, U.S.

Totuskey Creek is a tributary of the Rappahannock River located in Richmond County, Virginia. The creek meets the river near Wellford, Virginia.

The creek served as the eastern border of Rappahannock Tribe lands. In the 1650s, when colonists began settling along the river, the Rappahannock withdrew from the southern bank; their weroance Accopatough deeded the land east of Totuskey Creek to settlers just before he died in April 1651. His successor Taweeren confirmed the deed in May.

In 1730, a tobacco inspection site was located here. According to the Tobacco Inspection Act the inspection was "At Naylor's Hole, upon William Fantleroy's land, where his prise houses now are; and the mouth of Totaskey, at Newman Brokenborough's landing, in Richmond County; both under one inspection."

On September 6, 1778, Baptist minister Lewis Lunsford baptised Robert Carter III in the waters of this creek.
