= Slate River (Virginia) =

Coordinates: 37.71403°N 78.32528°W

Location
- Country: United States

Physical characteristics
- Source
  - location: Virginia

The Slate River is a 48.8-mile-long (78.5 km) tributary of the James River in the U.S. state of Virginia. It rises about 10 miles (16 km) northeast of Appomattox and flows northeast past Buckingham, eventually reaching the James River near Bremo Bluff. The river's course is entirely within Buckingham County.

== See also ==
- List of rivers of Virginia
