= Bush River (Virginia) =

Coordinates: 37°12′08″N 78°22′48″W

Location
- Country: United States

Physical characteristics
- Source
  - location: Virginia

The Bush River is a 22.6-mile-long (36.4 km) tributary of the Appomattox River in the U.S. state of Virginia. It rises northeast of Keysville near the junction of the boundaries between Charlotte, Prince Edward, and Lunenburg counties. It flows northeast through Prince Edward County and joins the Appomattox River 3 miles (5 km) east of Farmville.

== See also ==
- List of rivers of Virginia
