= Buffalo Creek (Maury River tributary) =

Coordinates: 37.67458°N 79.42670°W

Location
- Country: United States

Physical characteristics
- Source
  - location: Virginia

Buffalo Creek is a 16.0-mile-long (25.7 km) tributary of the Maury River in Rockbridge County in the U.S. state of Virginia. It is part of the James River watershed.

== See also ==
- List of rivers of Virginia
