= Jamaica, Virginia =

Unincorporated community in Virginia, United States

- Unincorporated community
- Location within Virginia Location within the United States
- Coordinates: 37°42′55″N 76°41′39″W
- Country: United States
- State: Virginia
- County: Middlesex
- Elevation: 105 ft (32 m)
- Time zone: UTC-5 (Eastern (EST))
  - Summer (DST): UTC-4 (EDT)
- ZIP code: 23079
- Area code: 804
- GNIS feature ID: 1477442

Jamaica is an unincorporated community in Middlesex County, Virginia, United States. Jamaica is located on U.S. Route 17, 9.3 miles (15.0 km) northwest of Saluda. Jamaica had a post office, which closed on August 5, 2006. Montague Island, which is on the Rappahannock River, is located in Jamaica. The Virginia Motor Speedway is located in Jamaica.
