= Yeocomico River =

Coordinates: 38°1′34″N 76°32′59″W

Location
- Country: United States
- State: Virginia
- Counties: Northumberland and Westmoreland

Physical characteristics
- Mouth
  - location: Potomac River
  - elevation: 0 feet (0 m)
- Length: 1.1 miles (1.8 km)

The Yeocomico River is a 1.1-mile-long (1.8 km) tidal tributary of the southern portion of the Potomac River in Virginia's Northern Neck. The Yeocomico forms the boundary between Westmoreland and Northumberland counties. Yeocomico is a Native American name roughly translated as "tossed to and fro by the waters." Others suggest it is an Algonquian word that means "four dwelling places" since the river has a branch on either side with each dividing into two large forks.

The Yeocomico River forms at the confluence of three rivers: the Northwest Yeocomico, the West Yeocomico, and the South Yeocomico rivers.

During the War of 1812, the Royal Marines Battalions raided the entrance to the Yeocomico River, which concluded with the capture of four schooners at the town of Kinsale, Virginia (August 1814).

== Tributaries ==
- Northwest Yeocomico River
  - Shannon Branch
  - White Point Creek
- West Yeocomico River
  - Kinsale Branch
  - Hampton Hall Branch
  - Long Cove
  - Wilkins Creek
- South Yeocomico River
  - Mill Creek
    - Drum Cove
  - Lodge Creek
    - Dungan Cove
  - Palmer Cove
    - Cornish Creek
- Parkers Creek

== See also ==
- List of Virginia rivers
