= Morris Branch (Strawberry Creek tributary) =

Stream in Virginia, USA

Morris Branch Tributary to Strawberry Creek
- Location of Morris Branch mouth Morris Branch (Strawberry Creek tributary) (the United States)

Location
- Country: United States
- State: Virginia
- County: Pittsylvania

Physical characteristics
- Source: Little Stewart Creek divide
  - location: about 1 mile north of Whitmell, Virginia
  - coordinates: 36°42′44″N 079°31′28″W
  - elevation: 795 ft (242 m)
- Mouth
  - location: about 0.5 miles southeast of Banister, Virginia
  - coordinates: 36°45′48″N 079°31′13″W
  - elevation: 653 ft (199 m)
- Length: 3.10 mi (4.99 km)
- Basin size: 4.13 square miles (10.7 km^{2})
- Discharge
  - location: Strawberry Creek
  - average: 5.64 cu ft/s (0.160 m^{3}/s) at mouth with Strawberry Creek

Basin features
- Progression: Strawberry Creek → Banister River → Dan River → Roanoke River → Albemarle Sound → Pamlico Sound → Atlantic Ocean
- River system: Roanoke River
- Tributaries
  - left: unnamed tributaries
  - right: unnamed tributaries
- Bridges: VA 41

Morris Branch is a 3.10 mi (4.99 km) long 1st order tributary to Strawberry Creek in Pittsylvania County, Virginia.

== Course ==
Morris Branch rises about 1 mile north of Whitmell, Virginia and then flows generally north to join Strawberry Creek about 0.5 miles southeast of Banister.

== Watershed ==
Morris Branch drains 4.13 square miles (10.7 km^{2}) of area, receives about 46.0 in/year of precipitation, has a wetness index of 393.96, and is about 49% forested.

== See also ==
- List of Virginia Rivers
