= Blacks Creek (Allen Creek tributary) =

Stream in Virginia, USA

Blacks Creek Tributary to Allen Creek
- Location of Blacks Creek mouth Blacks Creek (Allen Creek tributary) (the United States)

Location
- Country: United States
- State: Virginia
- County: Pittsylvania

Physical characteristics
- Source: unnamed tributary to Straightstone Creek divide
  - location: Renan, Virginia
  - coordinates: 36°58′30″N 079°10′47″W
  - elevation: 655 ft (200 m)
- Mouth
  - location: about 1 mile southwest of Hermosa, Virginia
  - coordinates: 36°56′02″N 079°08′41″W
  - elevation: 395 ft (120 m)
- Length: 4.87 mi (7.84 km)
- Basin size: 6.76 square miles (17.5 km^{2})
- Discharge
  - location: Allen Creek
  - average: 8.56 cu ft/s (0.242 m^{3}/s) at mouth with Allen Creek

Basin features
- Progression: Allen Creek → Banister River → Dan River → Roanoke River → Albemarle Sound → Pamlico Sound → Atlantic Ocean
- River system: Roanoke River
- Tributaries
  - left: unnamed tributaries
  - right: unnamed tributaries
- Bridges: VA 40, White Fall Road

Blacks Creek is a 4.87 mi (7.84 km) long 2nd order tributary to Allen Creek in Pittsylvania County, Virginia.

== Course ==
Blacks Creek rises in Renan, Virginia in Pittsylvania County and then flows southeast to join Allen Creek about 1 miles southwest of Hermosa.

== Watershed ==
Blacks Creek drains 6.76 square miles (17.5 km^{2}) of area, receives about 45.2 in/year of precipitation, has a wetness index of 405.09, and is about 55% forested.

== See also ==
- List of Virginia Rivers
