= Robins Branch =

Stream in Virginia, USA

Robins Branch Tributary to Banister River
- Location of Robins Branch mouth Robins Branch (the United States)

Location
- Country: United States
- State: Virginia
- County: Pittsylvania

Physical characteristics
- Source: Little Bearskin Creek divide
  - location: about 1 mile south of Rondo, Virginia
  - coordinates: 36°49′03″N 079°31′44″W
  - elevation: 830 ft (250 m)
- Mouth
  - location: about 0.5 miles northeast of Banister, Virginia
  - coordinates: 36°46′57″N 079°31′34″W
  - elevation: 650 ft (200 m)
- Length: 2.29 mi (3.69 km)
- Basin size: 1.62 square miles (4.2 km^{2})
- Discharge
  - location: Banister River
  - average: 2.32 cu ft/s (0.066 m^{3}/s) at mouth with Banister River

Basin features
- Progression: Banister River → Dan River → Roanoke River → Albemarle Sound → Pamlico Sound → Atlantic Ocean
- River system: Roanoke River
- Tributaries
  - left: unnamed tributaries
  - right: unnamed tributaries
- Bridges: none

Robins Branch is a 2.29 mi (3.69 km) long 2nd order tributary to the Banister River in Pittsylvania County, Virginia. This is the only stream of this name in the United States.

== Course ==
Robins Branch rises about 1 mile south of Rondo, Virginia and then flows generally south to join the Banister River about 0.5 miles northeast of Banister.

== Watershed ==
Robins Branch drains 1.62 square miles (4.2 km^{2}) of area, receives about 46.0 in/year of precipitation, has a wetness index of 361.47, and is about 31% forested.

== See also ==
- List of Virginia Rivers
