= Lick Branch (Bearskin Creek tributary) =

Stream in Virginia, USA

Lick Branch Tributary to Bearskin Creek
- Location of Lick Branch mouth Lick Branch (Bearskin Creek tributary) (the United States)

Location
- Country: United States
- State: Virginia
- County: Pittsylvania

Physical characteristics
- Source: unnamed tributary to Cherrystone Creek divide
  - location: pond about 0.5 miles south of Weal, Virginia
  - coordinates: 36°49′11″N 079°27′21″W
  - elevation: 810 ft (250 m)
- Mouth
  - location: about 1 mile north-northeast of Jones Mill, Virginia
  - coordinates: 36°46′30″N 079°27′25″W
  - elevation: 617 ft (188 m)
- Length: 2.64 mi (4.25 km)
- Basin size: 2.34 square miles (6.1 km^{2})
- Discharge
  - location: Bearskin Creek
  - average: 3.29 cu ft/s (0.093 m^{3}/s) at mouth with Bearskin Creek

Basin features
- Progression: Bearskin Creek → Banister River → Dan River → Roanoke River → Albemarle Sound → Pamlico Sound → Atlantic Ocean
- River system: Roanoke River
- Tributaries
  - left: unnamed tributaries
  - right: unnamed tributaries
- Bridges: Hickory Road, Irish Road

Lick Branch is a 2.64 mi (4.25 km) long 2nd order tributary to Bearskin Creek in Pittsylvania County, Virginia.

== Course ==
Lick Branch rises in a pond about 0.5 miles south of Weal, Virginia and then flows south to join Bearskin Creek about 1 mile northeast of Jones Mill.

== Watershed ==
Lick Branch drains 2.34 square miles (6.1 km^{2}) of area, receives about 45.7 in/year of precipitation, has a wetness index of 395.51, and is about 43% forested.

== See also ==
- List of Virginia Rivers
