= Pole Bridge Branch (Cherrystone Creek tributary) =

Stream in Virginia, USA

Pole Bridge Branch Tributary to Cherrystone Creek
- Location of Pole Bridge Branch mouth Pole Bridge Branch (Cherrystone Creek tributary) (the United States)

Location
- Country: United States
- State: Virginia
- County: Pittsylvania

Physical characteristics
- Source: Frying Pan Creek divide
  - location: pond about 3 miles northeast of Redeye, Virginia
  - coordinates: 36°55′23″N 079°26′21″W
  - elevation: 878 ft (268 m)
- Mouth
  - location: about 2 miles northwest of Chatham, Virginia
  - coordinates: 36°51′27″N 079°25′53″W
  - elevation: 650 ft (200 m)
- Length: 5.64 mi (9.08 km)
- Basin size: 6.64 square miles (17.2 km^{2})
- Discharge
  - location: Cherrystone Creek
  - average: 9.01 cu ft/s (0.255 m^{3}/s) at mouth with Cherrystone Creek

Basin features
- Progression: Cherrystone Creek → Banister River → Dan River → Roanoke River → Albemarle Sound → Pamlico Sound → Atlantic Ocean
- River system: Roanoke River
- Tributaries
  - left: unnamed tributaries
  - right: unnamed tributaries
- Waterbodies: Cherrystone Lake
- Bridges: Emery Road, Anderson Mill Road, Riddle Road

Pole Bridge Branch is a 5.64 mi (9.08 km) long 3rd order tributary to Cherrystone Creek in Pittsylvania County, Virginia.

== Course ==
Pole Bridge Branch rises in a pond about 3 miles northeast of Redeye, Virginia and then flows generally south to join Cherrystone Creek about 2 miles northwest of Chatham.

== Watershed ==
Pole Bridge Branch drains 6.64 square miles (17.2 km^{2}) of area, receives about 45.8 in/year of precipitation, has a wetness index of 399.70, and is about 41% forested.

== See also ==
- List of Virginia Rivers
