= Squirrel Creek (Banister River tributary) =

Stream in Virginia, USA

Squirrel Creek Tributary to Banister River
- Location of Squirrel Creek mouth Squirrel Creek (Banister River tributary) (the United States)

Location
- Country: United States
- State: Virginia
- County: Pittsylvania

Physical characteristics
- Source: unnamed tributary to Banister River divide
  - location: Riceville, Virginia
  - coordinates: 36°53′28″N 079°09′56″W
  - elevation: 585 ft (178 m)
- Mouth
  - location: about 2 miles south of Hermosa, Virginia
  - coordinates: 36°54′57″N 079°07′45″W
  - elevation: 389 ft (119 m)
- Length: 2.12 mi (3.41 km)
- Basin size: 2.68 square miles (6.9 km^{2})
- Discharge
  - location: Banister River
  - average: 3.52 cu ft/s (0.100 m^{3}/s) at mouth with Banister River

Basin features
- Progression: Banister River → Dan River → Roanoke River → Albemarle Sound → Pamlico Sound → Atlantic Ocean
- River system: Roanoke River
- Tributaries
  - left: unnamed tributaries
  - right: unnamed tributaries
- Bridges: none

Squirrel Creek is a 2.12 mi (3.41 km) long 1st order tributary to the Banister River in Pittsylvania County, Virginia.

== Course ==
Squirrel Creek rises at Riceville, Virginia in Pittsylvania County and then flows northeast to join the Banister River about 2 miles south of Hermosa.

== Watershed ==
Squirrel Creek drains 2.68 square miles (6.9 km^{2}) of area, receives about 45.3 in/year of precipitation, has a wetness index of 346.92, and is about 70% forested.

== See also ==
- List of Virginia Rivers
