= Dry Fork (White Oak Creek tributary) =

Stream in Virginia, USA

Dry Fork Tributary to White Oak Creek
- Location of Dry Fork mouth Dry Fork (White Oak Creek tributary) (the United States)

Location
- Country: United States
- State: Virginia
- County: Pittsylvania

Physical characteristics
- Source: unnamed tributary to Fall Creek divide
  - location: pond about 4 miles northeast of Pleasant Gap, Virginia
  - coordinates: 36°43′09″N 079°23′24″W
  - elevation: 770 ft (230 m)
- Mouth
  - location: about 0.5 miles north of Dry Fork, Virginia
  - coordinates: 36°45′57″N 079°24′02″W
  - elevation: 598 ft (182 m)
- Length: 4.12 mi (6.63 km)
- Basin size: 3.74 square miles (9.7 km^{2})
- Discharge
  - location: White Oak Creek
  - average: 5.08 cu ft/s (0.144 m^{3}/s) at mouth with White Oak Creek

Basin features
- Progression: White Oak Creek → Banister River → Dan River → Roanoke River → Albemarle Sound → Pamlico Sound → Atlantic Ocean
- River system: Roanoke River
- Tributaries
  - left: unnamed tributaries
  - right: unnamed tributaries
- Bridges: Lester Lane, Dry Fork Road

Dry Fork is a 4.12 mi (6.63 km) long 1st order tributary to White Oak Creek in Pittsylvania County, Virginia.

== Course ==
Dry Fork rises in a pond about 4 miles northeast of Pleasant Gap, Virginia and then flows generally north to join White Oak Creek about 0.5 miles north of Dry Fork.

== Watershed ==
Dry Fork drains 3.74 square miles (9.7 km^{2}) of area, receives about 45.8 in/year of precipitation, has a wetness index of 395.81, and is about 51% forested.

== See also ==
- List of Virginia Rivers
