= Johns Run (Sweden Fork tributary) =

Stream in Virginia, USA

Johns Run Tributary to Sweden Fork
- Location of Johns Run mouth Johns Run (Sweden Fork tributary) (the United States)

Location
- Country: United States
- State: Virginia
- County: Pittsylvania

Physical characteristics
- Source: unnamed tributary to Banister River divide
  - location: pond about 1 mile north of Spring Garden, Virginia
  - coordinates: 36°47′43″N 079°18′33″W
  - elevation: 722 ft (220 m)
- Mouth
  - location: about 1 mile northeast of Dodson Corners, Virginia
  - coordinates: 36°45′57″N 079°15′42″W
  - elevation: 493 ft (150 m)
- Length: 3.87 mi (6.23 km)
- Basin size: 3.84 square miles (9.9 km^{2})
- Discharge
  - location: Sweden Fork
  - average: 5.14 cu ft/s (0.146 m^{3}/s) at mouth with Sweden Fork

Basin features
- Progression: Sweden Fork → Sandy Creek → Banister River → Dan River → Roanoke River → Albemarle Sound → Pamlico Sound → Atlantic Ocean
- River system: Roanoke River
- Tributaries
  - left: unnamed tributaries
  - right: unnamed tributaries
- Bridges: Spring Garden Road

Johns Run is a 3.87 mi (6.23 km) long 1st order tributary to Sweden Fork in Pittsylvania County, Virginia.

== Course ==
Johns Run rises in a pond about 1 mile north of Spring Garden, Virginia in Pittsylvania County and then flows generally south to join Sweden Fork about 1 mile northeast of Dodson Corners.

== Watershed ==
Johns Run drains 3.84 square miles (9.9 km^{2}) of area, receives about 45.6 in/year of precipitation, has a wetness index of 393.97, and is about 41% forested.

== See also ==
- List of Virginia Rivers
