= Allen Creek (Banister River tributary) =

Stream in Virginia, USA

Allen Creek Tributary to Banister River
- Location of Allen Creek mouth Allen Creek (Banister River tributary) (the United States)

Location
- Country: United States
- State: Virginia
- County: Pittsylvania

Physical characteristics
- Source: unnamed tributary to Straightstone Creek divide
  - location: about 1 mile southeast of Straightstone, Virginia
  - coordinates: 37°00′18″N 079°07′55″W
  - elevation: 590 ft (180 m)
- Mouth
  - location: about 1 mile southwest of Hermosa, Virginia
  - coordinates: 36°55′49″N 079°08′34″W
  - elevation: 393 ft (120 m)
- Length: 5.47 mi (8.80 km)
- Basin size: 17.08 square miles (44.2 km^{2})
- Discharge
  - location: Banister River
  - average: 20.81 cu ft/s (0.589 m^{3}/s) at mouth with Banister River

Basin features
- Progression: Banister River → Dan River → Roanoke River → Albemarle Sound → Pamlico Sound → Atlantic Ocean
- River system: Roanoke River
- Tributaries
  - left: Peters Creek
  - right: Blacks Creek
- Bridges: Allen Creek Road, VA 40, Hermosa Road

Allen Creek is a 5.47 mi (8.80 km) long 3rd order tributary to the Banister River in Pittsylvania County, Virginia.

== Course ==
Allen Creek rises 2 miles southeast of Straightstone, Virginia in Pittsylvania County and then flows south-southwest to join the Banister River about 1 miles southwest of Hermosa.

== Watershed ==
Allen Creek drains 17.08 square miles (44.2 km^{2}) of area, receives about 45.2 in/year of precipitation, has a wetness index of 394.34, and is about 59% forested.

== See also ==
- List of Virginia Rivers
