= Peters Creek (Allen Creek tributary) =

Stream in Virginia, USA

Peters Creek Tributary to Allen Creek
- Location of Peters Creek mouth Peters Creek (Allen Creek tributary) (the United States)

Location
- Country: United States
- State: Virginia
- County: Pittsylvania; Halifax

Physical characteristics
- Source: Cow Creek divide
  - location: pond at Cody, Virginia
  - coordinates: 36°58′22″N 079°05′51″W
  - elevation: 660 ft (200 m)
- Mouth
  - location: about 0.5 miles west-northwest of Hermosa, Virginia
  - coordinates: 36°56′22″N 079°08′25″W
  - elevation: 405 ft (123 m)
- Length: 3.42 mi (5.50 km)
- Basin size: 2.82 square miles (7.3 km^{2})
- Discharge
  - location: Allen Creek
  - average: 3.70 cu ft/s (0.105 m^{3}/s) at mouth with Allen Creek

Basin features
- Progression: Allen Creek → Banister River → Dan River → Roanoke River → Albemarle Sound → Pamlico Sound → Atlantic Ocean
- River system: Roanoke River
- Tributaries
  - left: unnamed tributaries
  - right: unnamed tributaries
- Bridges: none

Peters Creek is a 3.42 mi (5.50 km) long 2nd order tributary to Allen Creek in Pittsylvania County, Virginia.

== Course ==
Peters Creek rises in a pond at Cody, Virginia in Halifax County and then flows southwest into Pittsylvania County to join Allen Creek about 0.5 miles west-northwest of Hermosa.

== Watershed ==
Peters Creek drains 2.82 square miles (7.3 km^{2}) of area, receives about 45.2 in/year of precipitation, has a wetness index of 379.91, and is about 65% forested.

== See also ==
- List of Virginia Rivers
