= Hemp Fork (Bearskin Creek tributary) =

Stream in Virginia, USA

Hemp Fork Tributary to Bearskin Creek
- Location of Hemp Fork mouth Hemp Fork (Bearskin Creek tributary) (the United States)

Location
- Country: United States
- State: Virginia
- County: Pittsylvania

Physical characteristics
- Source: Banister River divide
  - location: Rondo, Virginia
  - coordinates: 36°50′06″N 079°31′53″W
  - elevation: 870 ft (270 m)
- Mouth
  - location: about 0.5 miles north-northeast of Hollywood, Virginia
  - coordinates: 36°50′30″N 079°29′07″W
  - elevation: 715 ft (218 m)
- Length: 2.72 mi (4.38 km)
- Basin size: 2.89 square miles (7.5 km^{2})
- Discharge
  - location: Bearskin Creek
  - average: 4.07 cu ft/s (0.115 m^{3}/s) at mouth with Bearskin Creek

Basin features
- Progression: Bearskin Creek → Banister River → Dan River → Roanoke River → Albemarle Sound → Pamlico Sound → Atlantic Ocean
- River system: Roanoke River
- Tributaries
  - left: unnamed tributaries
  - right: unnamed tributaries
- Bridges: Hubbard Road, Hollywood Road

Hemp Fork is a 2.72 mi (4.38 km) long 2nd order tributary to Bearskin Creek in Pittsylvania County, Virginia.

== Course ==
Hemp Fork rises in Rondo, Virginia and then flows east to join Bearskin Creek about 0.5 miles northeast of Hollywood.

== Watershed ==
Hemp Fork drains 2.89 square miles (7.5 km^{2}) of area, receives about 46.0 in/year of precipitation, has a wetness index of 396.96, and is about 37% forested.

== See also ==
- List of Virginia Rivers
