= Bird Creek (Banister River tributary) =

Stream in Virginia, US

Bird Creek Tributary to Banister River
- Location of Bird Creek mouth Bird Creek (Banister River tributary) (the United States)

Location
- Country: United States
- State: Virginia
- County: Pittsylvania

Physical characteristics
- Source: unnamed tributary to Elkhorn Creek divide
  - location: pond about 4 miles northeast of Java, Virginia
  - coordinates: 36°51′52″N 079°12′09″W
  - elevation: 640 ft (200 m)
- Mouth
  - location: about 3 miles south-southeast of Mt. Airy, Virginia
  - coordinates: 36°54′27″N 079°10′33″W
  - elevation: 401 ft (122 m)
- Length: 3.90 mi (6.28 km)
- Basin size: 2.68 square miles (6.9 km^{2})
- Discharge
  - location: Banister River
  - average: 4.80 cu ft/s (0.136 m^{3}/s) at mouth with Banister River

Basin features
- Progression: Banister River → Dan River → Roanoke River → Albemarle Sound → Pamlico Sound → Atlantic Ocean
- River system: Roanoke River
- Tributaries
  - left: unnamed tributaries
  - right: unnamed tributaries
- Bridges: Riceville Road

Bird Creek is a 3.90 mi (6.28 km) long 2nd order tributary to the Banister River in Pittsylvania County, Virginia.

== Course ==
Bird Creek rises in a pond about 4 miles northeast of Java, Virginia, and then flows northeast to join the Banister River about 3 miles south-southeast of Mt. Airy.

== Watershed ==
Bird Creek drains 3.90 square miles (10.1 km^{2}) of area, receives about 45.3 in/year of precipitation, has a wetness index of 403.63, and is about 53% forested.

== See also ==
- List of Virginia Rivers
