= Whites Branch (Cherrystone Creek tributary) =

Stream in Virginia, USA

Whites Branch Tributary to Cherrystone Creek
- Location of Whites Branch mouth Whites Branch (Cherrystone Creek tributary) (the United States)

Location
- Country: United States
- State: Virginia
- County: Pittsylvania
- City: Chatham

Physical characteristics
- Source: Little Cherrystone Creek divide
  - location: northside of Chatham, Virginia
  - coordinates: 36°50′24″N 079°23′42″W
  - elevation: 760 ft (230 m)
- Mouth
  - location: west side of Chatham, Virginia
  - coordinates: 36°49′24″N 079°24′35″W
  - elevation: 607 ft (185 m)
- Length: 0.94 mi (1.51 km)
- Basin size: 2.77 square miles (7.2 km^{2})
- Discharge
  - location: Cherrystone Creek
  - average: 3.87 cu ft/s (0.110 m^{3}/s) at mouth with Cherrystone Creek

Basin features
- Progression: Cherrystone Creek → Banister River → Dan River → Roanoke River → Albemarle Sound → Pamlico Sound → Atlantic Ocean
- River system: Roanoke River
- Tributaries
  - left: unnamed tributaries
  - right: unnamed tributaries
- Bridges: Hodnetts Mill Road, Rison Street

Whites Branch is a 0.94 mi (1.51 km) long 2nd order tributary to Cherrystone Creek in Pittsylvania County, Virginia.

== Course ==
Whites Branch rises in the northside of Chatham, Virginia and then flows southwest to join Cherrystone Creek in the western part of Chatham.

== Watershed ==
Whites Branch drains 2.77 square miles (7.2 km^{2}) of area, receives about 45.8 in/year of precipitation, has a wetness index of 398.30, and is about 36% forested.

== See also ==
- List of Virginia Rivers
