= Little Bearskin Creek =

Stream in Virginia, USA

Little Bearskin Creek Tributary to Bearskin Creek
- Location of Little Bearskin Creek mouth Little Bearskin Creek (the United States)

Location
- Country: United States
- State: Virginia
- County: Pittsylvania

Physical characteristics
- Source: Robins Branch divide
  - location: about 0.25 miles southeast of Rondo, Virginia
  - coordinates: 36°49′23″N 079°31′37″W
  - elevation: 855 ft (261 m)
- Mouth
  - location: about 2 miles southwest of Weal, Virginia
  - coordinates: 36°48′18″N 079°28′28″W
  - elevation: 673 ft (205 m)
- Length: 3.29 mi (5.29 km)
- Basin size: 4.20 square miles (10.9 km^{2})
- Discharge
  - location: Bearskin Creek
  - average: 5.81 cu ft/s (0.165 m^{3}/s) at mouth with Bearskin Creek

Basin features
- Progression: Bearskin Creek → Banister River → Dan River → Roanoke River → Albemarle Sound → Pamlico Sound → Atlantic Ocean
- River system: Roanoke River
- Tributaries
  - left: unnamed tributaries
  - right: unnamed tributaries
- Bridges: Hollywood Road

Little Bearskin Creek is a 3.29 mi (5.29 km) long 2nd order tributary to Bearskin Creek in Pittsylvania County, Virginia. This is the only stream of this name in the United States.

== Course ==
Little Bearskin Creek rises about 0.25 miles southeast of Rondo, Virginia and then flows southeast to join Bearskin Creek about 2 miles southwest of Weal.

== Watershed ==
Little Bearskin Creek drains 4.20 square miles (10.9 km^{2}) of area, receives about 45.9 in/year of precipitation, has a wetness index of 384.44, and is about 54% forested.

== See also ==
- List of Virginia Rivers
