= Bolin Branch (Bearskin Creek tributary) =

Stream in Virginia, USA

Bolin Branch Tributary to Bearskin Creek
- Location of Bolin Branch mouth Bolin Branch (Bearskin Creek tributary) (the United States)

Location
- Country: United States
- State: Virginia
- County: Pittsylvania

Physical characteristics
- Source: Robins Branch divide
  - location: about 1.5 miles (2.4 km) south-southeast of Rondo, Virginia
  - coordinates: 36°48′55″N 079°31′21″W
  - elevation: 850 ft (260 m)
- Mouth
  - location: about 1.5 miles (2.4 km) north of Jones Mill, Virginia
  - coordinates: 36°46′44″N 079°27′35″W
  - elevation: 617 ft (188 m)
- Length: 4.01 mi (6.45 km)
- Basin size: 2.36 square miles (6.1 km^{2})
- Discharge
  - location: Bearskin Creek
  - average: 3.32 cu ft/s (0.094 m^{3}/s) at mouth with Bearskin Creek

Basin features
- Progression: Bearskin Creek → Banister River → Dan River → Roanoke River → Albemarle Sound → Pamlico Sound → Atlantic Ocean
- River system: Roanoke River
- Tributaries
  - left: unnamed tributaries
  - right: unnamed tributaries
- Bridges: Easley Brown Road, Bearskin Road, Mitchell Road

Bolin Branch is a 4.01 mi (6.45 km) long 1st order tributary to Bearskin Creek in Pittsylvania County, Virginia.

== Course ==
Bolin Branch rises about 1.5 miles (2.4 km) south-southeast of Rondo, Virginia and then flows southeast to join Bearskin Creek about 1.5 miles (2.4 km) north of Jones Mill.

== Watershed ==
Bolin Branch drains 2.36 square miles (6.1 km^{2}) of area, receives about 45.8 inches (1,160 mm) per year of precipitation, has a wetness index of 419.10, and is about 50% forested.

== See also ==
- List of Virginia Rivers
