= Green Rock Branch (Cherrystone Creek tributary) =

Stream in Virginia, USA

Green Rock Branch Tributary to Cherrystone Creek
- Location of Green Rock Branch mouth Green Rock Branch (Cherrystone Creek tributary) (the United States)

Location
- Country: United States
- State: Virginia
- County: Pittsylvania
- City: Chatham

Physical characteristics
- Source: Lick Branch divide
  - location: about 1 mile south-southeast of Weal, Virginia
  - coordinates: 36°48′59″N 079°27′07″W
  - elevation: 760 ft (230 m)
- Mouth
  - location: southwest side of Chatham, Virginia
  - coordinates: 36°48′26″N 079°24′27″W
  - elevation: 597 ft (182 m)
- Length: 3.02 mi (4.86 km)
- Basin size: 4.05 square miles (10.5 km^{2})
- Discharge
  - location: Cherrystone Creek
  - average: 5.56 cu ft/s (0.157 m^{3}/s) at mouth with Cherrystone Creek

Basin features
- Progression: Cherrystone Creek → Banister River → Dan River → Roanoke River → Albemarle Sound → Pamlico Sound → Atlantic Ocean
- River system: Roanoke River
- Tributaries
  - left: unnamed tributaries
  - right: unnamed tributaries
- Bridges: W Giles Road, Concord Road, Beverly Heights Road

Green Rock Branch is a 3.02 mi (4.86 km) long 2nd order tributary to Cherrystone Creek in Pittsylvania County, Virginia, USA.

== Course ==
Green Rock Branch rises about 1 mile south-southeast of Weal and then flows generally east to join Cherrystone Creek in the southwestern part of Chatham.

== Watershed ==
Green Rock Branch drains 4.05 square miles (10.5 km^{2}) of area, receives about 45.7 inches (1,160 mm) per year of precipitation, has a wetness index of 364.75, and is about 52% forested.

== See also ==
- List of Virginia Rivers
