= Little Cherrystone Creek =

Stream in Virginia, USA

Little Cherrystone Creek Tributary to Cherrystone Creek
- Location of Little Cherrystone Creek mouth Little Cherrystone Creek (the United States)

Location
- Country: United States
- State: Virginia
- County: Pittsylvania

Physical characteristics
- Source: unnamed tributary to Whites Branch divide
  - location: pond about 1 mile north of Chatham, Virginia
  - coordinates: 36°51′04″N 079°23′28″W
  - elevation: 795 ft (242 m)
- Mouth
  - location: about 2.5 miles southwest of Motleys Mill, Virginia
  - coordinates: 36°48′33″N 079°20′27″W
  - elevation: 558 ft (170 m)
- Length: 4.41 mi (7.10 km)
- Basin size: 45.52 square miles (117.9 km^{2})
- Discharge
  - location: Cherrystone Creek
  - average: 7.94 cu ft/s (0.225 m^{3}/s) at mouth with Cherrystone Creek

Basin features
- Progression: Cherrystone Creek → Banister River → Dan River → Roanoke River → Albemarle Sound → Pamlico Sound → Atlantic Ocean
- River system: Roanoke River
- Tributaries
  - left: unnamed tributaries
  - right: unnamed tributaries
- Bridges: Hailfax Road

Little Cherrystone Creek is a 4.41 mi (7.10 km) long 2nd order tributary to Cherrystone Creek in Pittsylvania County, Virginia. This is the only stream of this name in the United States.

== Course ==
Little Cherrystone Creek rises in a pond about 1 mile north of Chatham, Virginia and then flows southeast to join Cherrystone Creek about 2.5 miles southwest of Motleys Mill.

== Watershed ==
Little Cherrystone Creek drains 5.90 square miles (15.3 km^{2}) of area, receives about 45.6 in/year of precipitation, has a wetness index of 407.98, and is about 36% forested.

== See also ==
- List of Virginia Rivers
