= Strawberry Creek (Banister River tributary) =

Stream in Virginia, USA

Strawberry Creek Tributary to Banister River
- Location of Strawberry Creek mouth Strawberry Creek (Banister River tributary) (the United States)

Location
- Country: United States
- State: Virginia
- County: Pittsylvania

Physical characteristics
- Source: unnamed tributary to Sandy River divide
  - location: pond about 1 mile north of Swansonville, Virginia
  - coordinates: 36°44′55″N 079°34′53″W
  - elevation: 810 ft (250 m)
- Mouth
  - location: about 2.5 miles east of Banister, Virginia
  - coordinates: 36°46′24″N 079°29′55″W
  - elevation: 630 ft (190 m)
- Length: 5.92 mi (9.53 km)
- Basin size: 14.56 square miles (37.7 km^{2})
- Discharge
  - location: Banister River
  - average: 18.97 cu ft/s (0.537 m^{3}/s) at mouth with Banister River

Basin features
- Progression: Banister River → Dan River → Roanoke River → Albemarle Sound → Pamlico Sound → Atlantic Ocean
- River system: Roanoke River
- Tributaries
  - left: unnamed tributaries
  - right: Morris Branch
- Bridges: County Road, Strawberry Road

Strawberry Creek is a 5.92 mi (9.53 km) long 3rd order tributary to the Banister River in Pittsylvania County, Virginia.

== Course ==
Strawberry Creek rises in a pond about 1 mile north of Swansonville, Virginia and then flows generally northeast to join the Banister River about 2.5 miles east of Banister.

== Watershed ==
Strawberry Creek drains 14.56 square miles (37.7 km^{2}) of area, receives about 46.0 in/year of precipitation, has a wetness index of 388.69, and is about 51% forested.

== See also ==
- List of Virginia Rivers
