= Shockoe Creek (Banister River tributary) =

Stream in Virginia, USA

Shockoe Creek Tributary to Banister River
- Location of Shockoe Creek mouth Shockoe Creek (Banister River tributary) (the United States)

Location
- Country: United States
- State: Virginia
- County: Pittsylvania

Physical characteristics
- Source: unnamed tributary to Banister River divide
  - location: about 1.5 miles north of Spring Garden, Virginia
  - coordinates: 36°48′04″N 079°18′09″W
  - elevation: 780 ft (240 m)
- Mouth
  - location: about 0.5 miles east-southeast of Markham, Virginia
  - coordinates: 36°52′39″N 079°13′58″W
  - elevation: 479 ft (146 m)
- Length: 6.57 mi (10.57 km)
- Basin size: 9.80 square miles (25.4 km^{2})
- Discharge
  - location: Banister River
  - average: 12.56 cu ft/s (0.356 m^{3}/s) at mouth with Banister River

Basin features
- Progression: Banister River → Dan River → Roanoke River → Albemarle Sound → Pamlico Sound → Atlantic Ocean
- River system: Roanoke River
- Tributaries
  - left: unnamed tributaries
  - right: unnamed tributaries
- Bridges: Motleys Mill Road, Halifax Road, Coleman Mountain Road, Markham Road, McCormick Road

Shockoe Creek is a 6.57 mi (10.57 km) long 2nd order tributary to the Banister River in Pittsylvania County, Virginia.

== Course ==
Shockoe Creek rises about 1.5 miles north of Spring Garden, Virginia and then flows northeast to join the Banister River about 0.5 miles east-southeast of Markham.

== Watershed ==
Shockoe Creek drains 9.80 square miles (25.4 km^{2}) of area, receives about 45.5 in/year of precipitation, has a wetness index of 431.11, and is about 59% forested.

== See also ==
- List of Virginia Rivers
