= White Oak Creek (Banister River tributary) =

Stream in Virginia, USA

White Oak Creek Tributary to Banister River
- Location of White Oak Creek mouth White Oak Creek (Banister River tributary) (the United States)

Location
- Country: United States
- State: Virginia
- County: Pittsylvania

Physical characteristics
- Source: Sandy Creek divide
  - location: pond about 3 miles northeast of Whitmell, Virginia
  - coordinates: 36°43′12″N 079°28′39″W
  - elevation: 770 ft (230 m)
- Mouth
  - location: about 0.5 miles south-southwest of Tight Squeeze, Virginia
  - coordinates: 36°46′25″N 079°23′57″W
  - elevation: 592 ft (180 m)
- Length: 7.26 mi (11.68 km)
- Basin size: 15.84 square miles (41.0 km^{2})
- Discharge
  - location: Banister River
  - average: 20.46 cu ft/s (0.579 m^{3}/s) at mouth with Banister River

Basin features
- Progression: Banister River → Dan River → Roanoke River → Albemarle Sound → Pamlico Sound → Atlantic Ocean
- River system: Roanoke River
- Tributaries
  - left: unnamed tributaries
  - right: Dry Fork
- Bridges: Wi Powell Road, Hopewell Road, Dry Fork Road

White Oak Creek is a 7.26 mi (11.68 km) long 4th order tributary to the Banister River in Pittsylvania County, Virginia.

== Variant names ==
According to the Geographic Names Information System, it has also been known historically as:

- Whiteoak Creek

== Course ==
White Oak Creek rises in a pond about 3 miles northeast of Whitmell, Virginia and then flows generally northeast to join the Banister River about 0.5 miles south-southwest of Tight Squeeze.

== Watershed ==
White Oak Creek drains 15.84 square miles (41.0 km^{2}) of area, receives about 45.8 in/year of precipitation, has a wetness index of 418.01, and is about 46% forested.

== See also ==
- List of Virginia Rivers
