= Wet Sleeve Creek =

Stream in Virginia, USA

Wet Sleeve Creek Tributary to Banister River
- Location of Wet Sleeve Creek mouth Wet Sleeve Creek (the United States)

Location
- Country: United States
- State: Virginia
- County: Pittsylvania

Physical characteristics
- Source: Sailor Creek divide (Brier Mountain)
  - location: pond about 0.25 miles northeast of Callands, Virginia
  - coordinates: 36°49′44″N 079°34′41″W
  - elevation: 980 ft (300 m)
- Mouth
  - location: about 0.5 miles north of Banister, Virginia
  - coordinates: 36°46′54″N 079°31′52″W
  - elevation: 659 ft (201 m)
- Length: 5.87 mi (9.45 km)
- Basin size: 4.38 square miles (11.3 km^{2})
- Discharge
  - location: Banister River
  - average: 6.04 cu ft/s (0.171 m^{3}/s) at mouth with Banister River

Basin features
- Progression: Banister River → Dan River → Roanoke River → Albemarle Sound → Pamlico Sound → Atlantic Ocean
- River system: Roanoke River
- Tributaries
  - left: unnamed tributaries
  - right: unnamed tributaries
- Bridges: Wet Sleeve Creek Road, Gap Road

Wet Sleeve Creek is a 5.87 mi (9.45 km) long 2nd order tributary to the Banister River in Pittsylvania County, Virginia. This is the only stream of this name in the United States.

== Course ==
Wet Sleeve Creek rises in a pond about 0.25 miles northeast of Callands, Virginia and then flows south and then east to join the Banister River about 0.5 miles north of Banister.

== Watershed ==
Wet Sleeve Creek drains 4.38 square miles (11.3 km^{2}) of area, receives about 46.1 in/year of precipitation, has a wetness index of 346.31, and is about 51% forested.

== See also ==
- List of Virginia Rivers
