= Roaring Fork (Cherrystone Creek tributary) =

Stream in Virginia, USA

Roaring Fork Tributary to Cherrystone Creek
- Location of Roaring Fork mouth Roaring Fork (Cherrystone Creek tributary) (the United States)

Location
- Country: United States
- State: Virginia
- County: Pittsylvania

Physical characteristics
- Source: Harpen Creek divide
  - location: Climax, Virginia
  - coordinates: 36°53′11″N 079°29′15″W
  - elevation: 890 ft (270 m)
- Mouth
  - location: about 1.5 miles northwest of Chatham, Virginia
  - coordinates: 36°50′44″N 079°25′47″W
  - elevation: 640 ft (200 m)
- Length: 4.65 mi (7.48 km)
- Basin size: 5.61 square miles (14.5 km^{2})
- Discharge
  - location: Cherrystone Creek
  - average: 7.89 cu ft/s (0.223 m^{3}/s) at mouth with Cherrystone Creek

Basin features
- Progression: Cherrystone Creek → Banister River → Dan River → Roanoke River → Albemarle Sound → Pamlico Sound → Atlantic Ocean
- River system: Roanoke River
- Tributaries
  - left: unnamed tributaries
  - right: unnamed tributaries
- Bridges: Walkers Well Road, Cherrystone Lake Road

Roaring Fork is a 4.69 mi (7.55 km) long 2nd order tributary to Cherrystone Creek in Pittsylvania County, Virginia.

== Course ==
Roaring Fork rises in Climax, Virginia and then flows southeast to join Cherrystone Creek about 1.5 miles northwest of Chatham.

== Watershed ==
Roaring Fork drains 5.61 square miles (14.5 km^{2}) of area, receives about 45.9 in/year of precipitation, has a wetness index of 391.90, and is about 42% forested.

== See also ==
- List of Virginia Rivers
