= Sweden Fork (Sandy Creek tributary) =

Stream in Virginia, USA

Sweden Fork Tributary to Sandy Creek
- Location of Sweden Fork mouth Sweden Fork (Sandy Creek tributary) (the United States)

Location
- Country: United States
- State: Virginia
- County: Pittsylvania

Physical characteristics
- Source: Sandy Creek divide
  - location: pond about 1 mile northwest of Chestnut Level, Virginia
  - coordinates: 36°45′03″N 079°22′25″W
  - elevation: 770 ft (230 m)
- Mouth
  - location: about 1 mile northeast of Dodson Corners, Virginia
  - coordinates: 36°45′53″N 079°15′39″W
  - elevation: 491 ft (150 m)
- Length: 7.98 mi (12.84 km)
- Basin size: 16.06 square miles (41.6 km^{2})
- Discharge
  - location: Sandy Creek
  - average: 20.37 cu ft/s (0.577 m^{3}/s) at mouth with Sandy Creek

Basin features
- Progression: Sandy Creek → Banister River → Dan River → Roanoke River → Albemarle Sound → Pamlico Sound → Atlantic Ocean
- River system: Roanoke River
- Tributaries
  - left: Johns Run
  - right: unnamed tributaries
- Bridges: Owen Road, Cundiff Lane, Spring Garden Road, Mac Road

Sweden Fork is a 7.98 mi (12.84 km) long 2nd order tributary to Sandy Creek in Pittsylvania County, Virginia.

== Course ==
Sweden Fork rises in a pond about 1 mile northwest of Chestnut Level, Virginia in Pittsylvania County and then flows generally east to join Sandy Creek about 1 mile northeast of Dodson Corners.

== Watershed ==
Sweden Fork drains 16.06 square miles (41.6 km^{2}) of area, receives about 45.6 in/year of precipitation, has a wetness index of 381.67, and is about 44% forested.

== See also ==
- List of Virginia Rivers
