= Cherrystone Creek =

Stream in Virginia, US

Cherrystone Creek Tributary to Banister River
- Location of Cherrystone Creek mouth Cherrystone Creek (the United States)

Location
- Country: United States
- State: Virginia
- County: Pittsylvania
- City: Chatham

Physical characteristics
- Source: Potter Creek divide
  - location: about 0.5 miles northeast of Redeye, Virginia
  - coordinates: 36°55′01″N 079°27′56″W
  - elevation: 970 ft (300 m)
- Mouth
  - location: about 2 miles southwest of Motleys Mill, Virginia
  - coordinates: 36°48′26″N 079°20′23″W
  - elevation: 558 ft (170 m)
- Length: 13.36 mi (21.50 km)
- Basin size: 45.52 square miles (117.9 km^{2})
- Discharge
  - location: Banister River
  - average: 57.03 cu ft/s (1.615 m^{3}/s) at mouth with Banister River

Basin features
- Progression: Banister River → Dan River → Roanoke River → Albemarle Sound → Pamlico Sound → Atlantic Ocean
- River system: Roanoke River
- Tributaries
  - left: Pole Bridge Branch; Whites Branch; Tanyard Branch; Little Cherrystone Creek
  - right: Roaring Fork; Green Rock Branch
- Waterbodies: Cherrystone Lake
- Bridges: Old Red Eye Road, Anderson Mill Road, Hodnetts Mill Road, VA 57, US 29, Davis Road, Fairview Road

Cherrystone Creek is a 13.36 mi (21.50 km) long 3rd order tributary to the Banister River in Pittsylvania County, Virginia. This is the only stream of this name in the United States.

== Course ==
Cherrystone Creek rises about 0.5 miles northeast of Redeye, Virginia, and then flows southeast and turns northeast to join the Banister River about 2 miles southwest of Motleys Mill.

== Watershed ==
Cherrystone Creek drains 45.52 square miles (117.9 km^{2}) of area, receives about 45.7 in/year of precipitation, has a wetness index of 398.40, and is about 46% forested.

== See also ==
- List of Virginia Rivers
