= Mitchell Branch (Banister River tributary) =

Stream in Virginia, USA

Mitchell Branch Tributary to Banister River
- Location of Mitchell Branch mouth Mitchell Branch (Banister River tributary) (the United States)

Location
- Country: United States
- State: Virginia
- County: Pittsylvania

Physical characteristics
- Source: Sailor Creek divide (Brier Mountain)
  - location: about 1 mile northeast of Callands, Virginia
  - coordinates: 36°49′45″N 079°34′23″W
  - elevation: 925 ft (282 m)
- Mouth
  - location: about 0.5 miles southwest of Rondo, Virginia
  - coordinates: 36°49′45″N 079°32′29″W
  - elevation: 798 ft (243 m)
- Length: 2.29 mi (3.69 km)
- Basin size: 0.92 square miles (2.4 km^{2})
- Discharge
  - location: Banister River
  - average: 1.35 cu ft/s (0.038 m^{3}/s) at mouth with Banister River

Basin features
- Progression: Banister River → Dan River → Roanoke River → Albemarle Sound → Pamlico Sound → Atlantic Ocean
- River system: Roanoke River
- Tributaries
  - left: unnamed tributaries
  - right: unnamed tributaries
- Bridges: VA 57, N Briar Mountain Road, Hunter Road

Mitchell Branch is a 2.29 mi (3.69 km) long 1st order tributary to the Banister River in Pittsylvania County, Virginia.

== Course ==
Mitchell Branch rises about 1 mile northeast of Callands, Virginia and then flows south and then east to join the Banister River about 0.5 miles southwest of Rondo.

== Watershed ==
Mitchell Branch drains 0.92 square miles (2.4 km^{2}) of area, receives about 46.2 in/year of precipitation, has a wetness index of 351.00, and is about 44% forested.

== See also ==
- List of Virginia Rivers
