= Tanyard Branch (Cherrystone Creek tributary) =

Stream in Virginia, USA

Tanyard Branch Tributary to Cherrystone Creek
- Location of Tanyard Branch mouth Tanyard Branch (Cherrystone Creek tributary) (the United States)

Location
- Country: United States
- State: Virginia
- County: Pittsylvania
- City: Chatham

Physical characteristics
- Source: unnamed tributary to Whites Branch divide
  - location: southside of Chatham, Virginia
  - coordinates: 36°50′02″N 079°23′29″W
  - elevation: 720 ft (220 m)
- Mouth
  - location: northeast side of Chatham, Virginia
  - coordinates: 36°48′20″N 079°22′44″W
  - elevation: 574 ft (175 m)
- Length: 1.78 mi (2.86 km)
- Basin size: 2.14 square miles (5.5 km^{2})
- Discharge
  - location: Cherrystone Creek
  - average: 3.00 cu ft/s (0.085 m^{3}/s) at mouth with Cherrystone Creek

Basin features
- Progression: Cherrystone Creek → Banister River → Dan River → Roanoke River → Albemarle Sound → Pamlico Sound → Atlantic Ocean
- River system: Roanoke River
- Tributaries
  - left: unnamed tributaries
  - right: unnamed tributaries
- Bridges: Chatham Hall Circle, Haifax Road, US 29

Tanyard Branch is a 1.78 mi (2.86 km) long 2nd order tributary to Cherrystone Creek in Pittsylvania County, Virginia. Tanyard Branch forms the southeast boundary of Chatham, Virginia.

== Course ==
Tanyard Branch rises in the northeastern part of Chatham, Virginia and then flows southeast to join Cherrystone Creek in the southeastern part of Chatham.

== Watershed ==
Tanyard Branch drains 2.14 square miles (5.5 km^{2}) of area, receives about 45.6 in/year of precipitation, has a wetness index of 389.95, and is about 46% forested.

== See also ==
- List of Virginia Rivers
