= Tompkins Branch =

Stream in Virginia, USA

Tompkins Branch Tributary to Pudding Creek
- Location of Tompkins Branch mouth Tompkins Branch (the United States)

Location
- Country: United States
- State: Virginia
- County: Pittsylvania

Physical characteristics
- Source: Morris Branch divide
  - location: pond about 2 miles northeast of Woods Store, Virginia
  - coordinates: 36°45′00″N 079°30′20″W
  - elevation: 820 ft (250 m)
- Mouth
  - location: about 0.5 miles northwest of Hopewell, Virginia
  - coordinates: 36°45′14″N 079°28′54″W
  - elevation: 675 ft (206 m)
- Length: 1.61 mi (2.59 km)
- Basin size: 0.88 square miles (2.3 km^{2})
- Discharge
  - location: Pudding Creek
  - average: 1.28 cu ft/s (0.036 m^{3}/s) at mouth with Pudding Creek

Basin features
- Progression: Pudding Creek → Banister River → Dan River → Roanoke River → Albemarle Sound → Pamlico Sound → Atlantic Ocean
- River system: Roanoke River
- Tributaries
  - left: unnamed tributaries
  - right: unnamed tributaries
- Bridges: Maurakis Road, Irish Road

Tompkins Branch is a 1.61 mi (2.59 km) long 1st order tributary to the Pudding Creek in Pittsylvania County, Virginia. This is the only stream of this name in the United States.

== Course ==
Tompkins Branch rises in a pond about 2 miles northeast of Woods Store, Virginia, and then flows generally east to join Pudding Creek about 0.5 miles northwest of Hopewell.

== Watershed ==
Tompkins Branch drains 0.88 square miles (2.3 km^{2}) of area, receives about 45.9 in/year of precipitation, has a wetness index of 446.94, and is about 40% forested.

== See also ==
- List of Virginia Rivers
