= Bye Creek =

Stream in Virginia, USA

Bye Creek Tributary to Banister River
- Location of Bye Creek mouth Bye Creek (the United States)

Location
- Country: United States
- State: Virginia
- County: Halifax; Pittsylvania

Physical characteristics
- Source: Elkhorn Creek divide
  - location: spring about 0.25 miles southwest of Chaneys Store, Virginia
  - coordinates: 36°50′36″N 079°09′11″W
  - elevation: 600 ft (180 m)
- Mouth
  - location: about 1.5 miles north-northwest of Meadville, Virginia
  - coordinates: 36°51′06″N 079°02′35″W
  - elevation: 360 ft (110 m)
- Length: 6.87 mi (11.06 km)
- Basin size: 10.74 square miles (27.8 km^{2})
- Discharge
  - location: Banister River
  - average: 13.35 cu ft/s (0.378 m^{3}/s) at mouth with Banister River

Basin features
- Progression: Banister River → Dan River → Roanoke River → Albemarle Sound → Pamlico Sound → Atlantic Ocean
- River system: Roanoke River
- Tributaries
  - left: unnamed tributaries
  - right: unnamed tributaries
- Bridges: Leda Road, Beulah Road

Bye Creek is a 6.87 mi (11.06 km) long 2nd order tributary to the Banister River in Halifax County, Virginia. This is the only stream of this name in the United States.

== Course ==
Bye Creek rises in a spring about 0.25 miles southwest of Chaneys Store, Virginia in Pittsylvania County and then flows generally east into Halifax County to join the Banister River about 1.5 miles north-northwest of Meadville.

== Watershed ==
Bye Creek drains 10.74 square miles (27.8 km^{2}) of area, receives about 45.5 in/year of precipitation, has a wetness index of 374.04, and is about 55% forested.

== See also ==
- List of Virginia Rivers
