= Elkhorn Creek (Banister River tributary) =

Stream in Virginia, USA

Elkhorn Creek Tributary to Banister River
- Location of Elkhorn Creek mouth Elkhorn Creek (Banister River tributary) (the United States)

Location
- Country: United States
- State: Virginia
- County: Halifax; Pittsylvania

Physical characteristics
- Source: Shockoe Creek divide
  - location: pond at Shockoe, Virginia
  - coordinates: 36°48′46″N 079°15′39″W
  - elevation: 700 ft (210 m)
- Mouth
  - location: about 1.5 miles southwest of Leda, Virginia
  - coordinates: 36°53′55″N 079°06′36″W
  - elevation: 379 ft (116 m)
- Length: 12.46 mi (20.05 km)
- Basin size: 22.17 square miles (57.4 km^{2})
- Discharge
  - location: Banister River
  - average: 27.10 cu ft/s (0.767 m^{3}/s) at mouth with Banister River

Basin features
- Progression: Banister River → Dan River → Roanoke River → Albemarle Sound → Pamlico Sound → Atlantic Ocean
- River system: Roanoke River
- Tributaries
  - left: unnamed tributaries
  - right: unnamed tributaries
- Waterbodies: Elkhorn Lake
- Bridges: Church Road, Logan Road

Elkhorn Creek is a 12.46 mi (20.05 km) long 3rd order tributary to the Banister River in Halifax County, Virginia.

== Course ==
Elkhorn Creek rises in a pond at Shockoe, Virginia in Halifax County and then flows generally northeast to join the Banister River about 1.5 miles southwest of Leda.

== Watershed ==
Elkhorn Creek drains 22.17 square miles (57.4 km^{2}) of area, receives about 45.5 in/year of precipitation, has a wetness index of 402.58, and is about 62% forested.

== See also ==
- List of Virginia Rivers
