= Little Polecat Creek (Polecat Creek tributary-Virginia) =

Stream in Virginia, USA

Little Polecat Creek Tributary to Polecat Creek
- Location of Little Polecat Creek mouth Little Polecat Creek (Polecat Creek tributary-Virginia) (the United States)

Location
- Country: United States
- State: Virginia
- County: Halifax

Physical characteristics
- Source: unnamed tributary to Mikes Creek divide
  - location: about 3 miles west of Halifax, Virginia
  - coordinates: 36°47′23″N 079°00′08″W
  - elevation: 490 ft (150 m)
- Mouth
  - location: about 2.5 miles northwest of Halifax, Virginia
  - coordinates: 36°47′23″N 078°59′36″W
  - elevation: 355 ft (108 m)
- Length: 3.29 mi (5.29 km)
- Basin size: 4.02 square miles (10.4 km^{2})
- Discharge
  - location: Polecat Creek
  - average: 5.13 cu ft/s (0.145 m^{3}/s) at mouth with Polecat Creek

Basin features
- Progression: Polecat Creek → Banister River → Dan River → Roanoke River → Albemarle Sound → Pamlico Sound → Atlantic Ocean
- River system: Roanoke River
- Tributaries
  - left: unnamed tributaries
  - right: unnamed tributaries
- Bridges: Chatham Road

Little Polecat Creek is a 3.29 mi (5.29 km) long 3rd order tributary to Polecat Creek in Halifax County, Virginia.

== Course ==
Little Polecat Creek rises about 3 miles west of Halifax, Virginia in Halifax County and then flows northeast to join Polecat Creek about 2.5 miles northwest of Halifax.

== Watershed ==
Little Polecat Creek drains 4.02 square miles (10.4 km^{2}) of area, receives about 45.5 in/year of precipitation, has a wetness index of 390.37, and is about 53% forested.

== See also ==
- List of Virginia Rivers
