= Greenacre (disambiguation) =

Greenacre may refer to:

- Greenacre, New South Wales, suburb of Sydney, Australia
- Greenacre (Farmington, Maine), listed on the NRHP in Maine
- Greenacre (surname)
- Greenacre Academy, a boys' secondary school in Walderslade, Kent, England
- Greenacre School for Girls, an independent school in Banstead, Surrey, England
- Greenacre Foundation, created in 1968 by Abby Rockefeller Mauzé to maintain and operate parks in New York State

== See also ==
- Greenacre or Blackacre, the common placeholder name for estates in law
- Greenacres (disambiguation)
- Green Acres (disambiguation)
