= Bradley Creek =

Bradley Creek may refer to one of the following places in the United States:

- Bradley Creek (California)
- Bradley Creek (Iowa)
- Bradley Creek (Middle Fork Flathead River tributary), a stream in Montana
- Bradley Creek (Banister River tributary), a stream in Halifax County, Virginia
- Bradley Creek (Wisconsin)
