= Bearskin Creek (Banister River tributary) =

Stream in Virginia, USA

Bearskin Creek Tributary to Banister River
- Location of Bearskin Creek mouth Bearskin Creek (Banister River tributary) (the United States)

Location
- Country: United States
- State: Virginia
- County: Pittsylvania

Physical characteristics
- Source: Tomahawk Creek divide
  - location: pond about 0.5 miles south of Green Pond, Virginia
  - coordinates: 36°52′58″N 079°29′26″W
  - elevation: 890 ft (270 m)
- Mouth
  - location: about 0.5 miles northeast of Jones Mill, Virginia
  - coordinates: 36°46′13″N 079°27′12″W
  - elevation: 613 ft (187 m)
- Length: 9.46 mi (15.22 km)
- Basin size: 21.81 square miles (56.5 km^{2})
- Discharge
  - location: Banister River
  - average: 28.25 cu ft/s (0.800 m^{3}/s) at mouth with Banister River

Basin features
- Progression: Banister River → Dan River → Roanoke River → Albemarle Sound → Pamlico Sound → Atlantic Ocean
- River system: Roanoke River
- Tributaries
  - left: Lick Branch
  - right: Hemp Fork; Little Bearskin Creek; Bolin Branch
- Bridges: Anderson Road, VA 57, Weal Road, Mitchell Road, Irish Road

Bearskin Creek is a 9.46 mi (15.22 km) long 3rd order tributary to the Banister River in Pittsylvania County, Virginia.

== Course ==
Bearskin Creek rises in a pond about 0.5 miles south of Green Pond, Virginia and then flows south-southeast to join the Banister River about 0.5 miles northeast of Jones Mill.

== Watershed ==
Bearskin Creek drains 21.81 square miles (56.5 km^{2}) of area, receives about 45.9 in/year of precipitation, has a wetness index of 446.94, and is about 45% forested.

== See also ==
- List of Virginia Rivers
