= Little Terrible Creek (Terrible Creek tributary-Virginia) =

Stream in Virginia, USA

Little Terrible Creek Tributary to Terrible Creek
- Location of Little Terrible Creek mouth Little Terrible Creek (Terrible Creek tributary-Virginia) (the United States)

Location
- Country: United States
- State: Virginia
- County: Halifax

Physical characteristics
- Source: Catawba Creek divide
  - location: Catawba, Virginia
  - coordinates: 36°55′12″N 078°57′09″W
  - elevation: 525 ft (160 m)
- Mouth
  - location: about 4 miles southwest of Crystal Hill, Virginia
  - coordinates: 36°49′43″N 078°57′00″W
  - elevation: 364 ft (111 m)
- Length: 6.77 mi (10.90 km)
- Basin size: 14.65 square miles (37.9 km^{2})
- Discharge
  - location: Terrible Creek
  - average: 17.98 cu ft/s (0.509 m^{3}/s) at mouth with Terrible Creek

Basin features
- Progression: Terrible Creek → Banister River → Dan River → Roanoke River → Albemarle Sound → Pamlico Sound → Atlantic Ocean
- River system: Roanoke River
- Tributaries
  - left: unnamed tributaries
  - right: unnamed tributaries
- Bridges: Crystal Hill Road

Little Terrible Creek is a 6.77 mi (10.90 km) long 2nd order tributary to Terrible Creek in Halifax County, Virginia.

== Course ==
Little Terrible Creek rises at Catawba, Virginia in Halifax County and then flows south to join Terrible Creek about 4 miles southwest of Crystal Hill.

== Watershed ==
Little Terrible Creek drains 14.65 square miles (37.9 km^{2}) of area, receives about 45.6 in/year of precipitation, has a wetness index of 406.59, and is about 56% forested.

== See also ==
- List of Virginia Rivers
