= Pudding Creek (Banister River tributary) =

Stream in Virginia, USA

Pudding Creek Tributary to Banister River
- Location of Pudding Creek mouth Pudding Creek (Banister River tributary) (the United States)

Location
- Country: United States
- State: Virginia
- County: Pittsylvania

Physical characteristics
- Source: Sandy Creek divide
  - location: pond about 2 miles east-southeast of Woods Store, Virginia
  - coordinates: 36°43′37″N 079°30′07″W
  - elevation: 820 ft (250 m)
- Mouth
  - location: about 0.5 miles northeast of Jones Mill, Virginia
  - coordinates: 36°46′09″N 079°26′54″W
  - elevation: 615 ft (187 m)
- Length: 5.24 mi (8.43 km)
- Basin size: 5.64 square miles (14.6 km^{2})
- Discharge
  - location: Banister River
  - average: 7.65 cu ft/s (0.217 m^{3}/s) at mouth with Banister River

Basin features
- Progression: Banister River → Dan River → Roanoke River → Albemarle Sound → Pamlico Sound → Atlantic Ocean
- River system: Roanoke River
- Tributaries
  - left: Tompkins Branch
  - right: unnamed tributaries
- Bridges: Johnson Road, Stowe Lane, Jones Mill Road

Pudding Creek is a 5.24 mi (8.43 km) long 2nd order tributary to the Banister River in Pittsylvania County, Virginia.

== Course ==
Pudding Creek rises in a pond about 2 miles east-southeast of Woods Store, Virginia and then flows northeast to join the Banister River about 0.5 miles northeast of Jones Mill.

== Watershed ==
Pudding Creek drains 5.64 square miles (14.6 km^{2}) of area, receives about 45.9 in/year of precipitation, has a wetness index of 439.65, and is about 37% forested.

== See also ==
- List of Virginia Rivers
