= Roaring Fork =

Roaring Fork may refer to:

- Roaring Fork, Virginia, USA
- Roaring Fork Mountain (Wyoming) — a mountain in the Wind River Range, Wyoming, USA
- Roaring Fork River — a river in west central Colorado, USA
- Roaring Fork (Great Smoky Mountains) — a stream and National Historic District in the Great Smoky Mountains National Park of east Tennessee, USA
- Roaring Fork Valley, Colorado, USA
- Roaring Fork (Cherrystone Creek tributary), a stream in Pittsylvania County, Virginia
