= Terrible Creek (Banister River tributary) =

Stream in Virginia, USA

Terrible Creek Tributary to Banister River
- Location of Terrible Creek mouth Terrible Creek (Banister River tributary) (the United States)

Location
- Country: United States
- State: Virginia
- County: Halifax

Physical characteristics
- Source: unnamed tributary to Catawba Creek divide
  - location: about 1 mile southeast of Volens, Virginia
  - coordinates: 36°56′01″N 079°00′18″W
  - elevation: 600 ft (180 m)
- Mouth
  - location: about 0.5 miles north of Halifax, Virginia
  - coordinates: 36°46′44″N 078°55′11″W
  - elevation: 344 ft (105 m)
- Length: 13.44 mi (21.63 km)
- Basin size: 39.00 square miles (101.0 km^{2})
- Discharge
  - location: Banister River
  - average: 45.89 cu ft/s (1.299 m^{3}/s) at mouth with Banister River

Basin features
- Progression: Banister River → Dan River → Roanoke River → Albemarle Sound → Pamlico Sound → Atlantic Ocean
- River system: Roanoke River
- Tributaries
  - left: Little Terrible Creek
  - right: unnamed tributaries
- Bridges: Beaver Pond Road, Liberty Road, Woodbourne Road, Dudley Road

Terrible Creek is a 13.44 mi (21.63 km) long 3rd order tributary to the Banister River in Halifax County, Virginia.

== Course ==
Terrible Creek rises about 1 mile southeast of Volens, Virginia in Halifax County and then flows generally southeast to join the Banister River about 0.5 miles north of Halifax.

== Watershed ==
Terrible Creek drains 37.00 square miles (95.8 km^{2}) of area, receives about 45.5 in/year of precipitation, has a wetness index of 398.10, and is about 54% forested.

== See also ==
- List of Virginia Rivers
