= Polecat Creek (Banister River tributary) =

Stream in Virginia, USA

Polecat Creek Tributary to Banister River
- Location of Polecat Creek mouth Polecat Creek (Banister River tributary) (the United States)

Location
- Country: United States
- State: Virginia
- County: Halifax

Physical characteristics
- Source: unnamed tributary to Birch Creek divide
  - location: Vernon Hill, Virginia
  - coordinates: 36°47′47″N 078°58′36″W
  - elevation: 640 ft (200 m)
- Mouth
  - location: about 2 miles northwest of Halifax, Virginia
  - coordinates: 36°45′03″N 079°05′34″W
  - elevation: 352 ft (107 m)
- Length: 9.87 mi (15.88 km)
- Basin size: 19.26 square miles (49.9 km^{2})
- Discharge
  - location: Banister River
  - average: 23.21 cu ft/s (0.657 m^{3}/s) at mouth with Banister River

Basin features
- Progression: Banister River → Dan River → Roanoke River → Albemarle Sound → Pamlico Sound → Atlantic Ocean
- River system: Roanoke River
- Tributaries
  - left: unnamed tributaries
  - right: Little Polecat Creek
- Bridges: Ridge Road, Chatham Road

Polecat Creek is a 9.87 mi (15.88 km) long 4th order tributary to the Banister River in Halifax County, Virginia.

== Course ==
Polecat Creek rises at Vernon Hill, Virginia in Halifax County and then flows northeast to join the Banister River about 2 miles northwest of Halifax.

== Watershed ==
Polecat Creek drains 19.26 square miles (49.9 km^{2}) of area, receives about 45.6 in/year of precipitation, has a wetness index of 377.20, and is about 55% forested.

== See also ==
- List of Virginia Rivers
