= Winn Creek (Banister River tributary) =

Stream in Virginia, USA

Winn Creek Tributary to Banister River
- Location of Winn Creek mouth Winn Creek (Banister River tributary) (the United States)

Location
- Country: United States
- State: Virginia
- County: Halifax

Physical characteristics
- Source: Mill Branch divide
  - location: pond about 0.5 miles south of Crystal Hill, Virginia
  - coordinates: 36°50′54″N 078°54′19″W
  - elevation: 530 ft (160 m)
- Mouth
  - location: about 3 miles east of Halifax, Virginia
  - coordinates: 36°45′59″N 078°52′59″W
  - elevation: 323 ft (98 m)
- Length: 6.93 mi (11.15 km)
- Basin size: 12.32 square miles (31.9 km^{2})
- Discharge
  - location: Banister River
  - average: 15.04 cu ft/s (0.426 m^{3}/s) at mouth with Banister River

Basin features
- Progression: Banister River → Dan River → Roanoke River → Albemarle Sound → Pamlico Sound → Atlantic Ocean
- River system: Roanoke River
- Tributaries
  - left: unnamed tributaries
  - right: unnamed tributaries
- Bridges: Winns Creek Road, Bethel Road

Winn Creek is a 6.93 mi (11.15 km) long 3rd order tributary to the Banister River in Halifax County, Virginia.

== Course ==
Winn Creek rises in a pond about 0.5 mi (0.80 km) south of Crystal Hill, Virginia in Halifax County and then flows south-southeast to join the Banister River about 3 mi (4.8 km) east of Halifax.

== Watershed ==
Winn Creek drains 12.32 square miles (31.9 km^{2}) of area, receives about 45.5 in/year of precipitation, has a wetness index of 399.12, and is about 55% forested.

== See also ==
- List of Virginia Rivers
