= Myer Creek =

Myer Creek may refer to:

- Myer Creek (Coyote Wash), in Imperial County, California
- Myer Creek (Bear Creek tributary), in Jackson County, Oregon
- Myers Creek (Banister River tributary), in Halifax County, Virginia
