= Brush Creek (Banister River tributary) =

Stream in Virginia, USA

Brush Creek Tributary to Banister River
- Location of Brush Creek mouth Brush Creek (Banister River tributary) (the United States)

Location
- Country: United States
- State: Virginia
- County: Halifax

Physical characteristics
- Source: unnamed tributary to Peters Creek divide
  - location: pond about 0.5 miles southwest of North Stanton, Virginia
  - coordinates: 36°57′53″N 079°04′53″W
  - elevation: 665 ft (203 m)
- Mouth
  - location: about 2 miles southwest of Hickory Grove, Virginia
  - coordinates: 36°54′13″N 079°06′59″W
  - elevation: 381 ft (116 m)
- Length: 5.02 mi (8.08 km)
- Basin size: 5.37 square miles (13.9 km^{2})
- Discharge
  - location: Banister River
  - average: 6.85 cu ft/s (0.194 m^{3}/s) at mouth with Banister River

Basin features
- Progression: Banister River → Dan River → Roanoke River → Albemarle Sound → Pamlico Sound → Atlantic Ocean
- River system: Roanoke River
- Tributaries
  - left: unnamed tributaries
  - right: unnamed tributaries
- Bridges: Brush Creek Road, Pumping Hill Road

Brush Creek is a 5.02 mi (8.08 km) long 3rd order tributary to the Banister River in Halifax County, Virginia.

== Course ==
Brush Creek rises about 0.5 miles southwest of North Stanton, Virginia in Halifax County and then flows south-southwest to join the Banister River about 2 miles southwest of Hickory Grove.

== Watershed ==
Brush Creek drains 5.37 square miles (13.9 km^{2}) of area, receives about 45.3 in/year of precipitation, has a wetness index of 338.90, and is about 56% forested.

== See also ==
- List of Virginia Rivers
