= Wolf Trap Creek =

Stream in Virginia, USA

Wolf Trap Creek Tributary to Banister River
- Location of Wolf Trap Creek mouth Wolf Trap Creek (the United States)

Location
- Country: United States
- State: Virginia
- County: Halifax

Physical characteristics
- Source: Reedy Creek divide
  - location: about 0.5 miles east of Loves Shop, Virginia
  - coordinates: 36°43′49″N 078°53′17″W
  - elevation: 460 ft (140 m)
- Mouth
  - location: about 0.5 miles northeast of Wolf Trap, Virginia
  - coordinates: 36°43′17″N 078°48′34″W
  - elevation: 306 ft (93 m)
- Length: 3.77 mi (6.07 km)
- Basin size: 3.56 square miles (9.2 km^{2})
- Discharge
  - location: Banister River
  - average: 4.49 cu ft/s (0.127 m^{3}/s) at mouth with Banister River

Basin features
- Progression: Banister River → Dan River → Roanoke River → Albemarle Sound → Pamlico Sound → Atlantic Ocean
- River system: Roanoke River
- Tributaries
  - left: unnamed tributaries
  - right: unnamed tributaries
- Bridges: Us 360

Wolf Trap Creek is a 3.77 mi (6.07 km) long 2nd order tributary to the Banister River in Halifax County, Virginia. This is the only stream of this name in the United States.

== Variant names ==
According to the Geographic Names Information System, it has also been known historically as:

- Wolf Creek

== Course ==
Wolf Trap Creek rises about 0.5 miles east of Loves Shop, Virginia in Halifax County and then flows east-southeast to join the Banister River about 0.5 miles northeast of Wolf Trap.

== Watershed ==
Wolf Trap Creek drains 3.51 square miles (9.1 km^{2}) of area, receives about 45.6 in/year of precipitation, has a wetness index of 479.74, and is about 41% forested.

== See also ==
- List of Virginia Rivers
