= Runaway Creek (Banister River tributary) =

Stream in Virginia, USA

Runaway Creek Tributary to Banister River
- Location of Runaway Creek mouth Runaway Creek (Banister River tributary) (the United States)

Location
- Country: United States
- State: Virginia
- County: Halifax

Physical characteristics
- Source: Cow Creek divide
  - location: about 0.5 miles south of North Stanton, Virginia
  - coordinates: 36°57′39″N 079°04′50″W
  - elevation: 628 ft (191 m)
- Mouth
  - location: about 2 miles southeast of Leda, Virginia
  - coordinates: 36°52′58″N 079°04′29″W
  - elevation: 374 ft (114 m)
- Length: 6.16 mi (9.91 km)
- Basin size: 7.71 square miles (20.0 km^{2})
- Discharge
  - location: Banister River
  - average: 9.73 cu ft/s (0.276 m^{3}/s) at mouth with Banister River=

Basin features
- Progression: Banister River → Dan River → Roanoke River → Albemarle Sound → Pamlico Sound → Atlantic Ocean
- River system: Roanoke River
- Tributaries
  - left: unnamed tributaries
  - right: unnamed tributaries
- Bridges: Runaway Road, Leda Grove Road

Runaway Creek is a 6.16 mi (9.91 km) long 2nd order tributary to the Banister River in Halifax County, Virginia.

== Variant names ==
According to the Geographic Names Information System, it has also been known historically as:

- Runway Creek

== Course ==
Runaway Creek rises about 0.5 miles south of North Stanton, Virginia in Halifax County and then flows south to join the Banister River about 2.0 miles southeast of Leda.

== Watershed ==
Runaway Creek drains 7.71 square miles (20.0 km^{2}) of area, receives about 45.4 in/year of precipitation, has a wetness index of 385.15, and is about 51% forested.

== See also ==
- List of Virginia Rivers
