= Kents Creek (Banister River tributary) =

Stream in Virginia, USA

Kents Creek Tributary to Banister River
- Location of Kents Creek mouth Kents Creek (Banister River tributary) (the United States)

Location
- Country: United States
- State: Virginia
- County: Halifax

Physical characteristics
- Source: unnamed tributary to Mikes Creek divide
  - location: pond about 1 mile southwest of Halifax, Virginia
  - coordinates: 36°45′22″N 078°58′10″W
  - elevation: 475 ft (145 m)
- Mouth
  - location: about 1 mile northwest of Halifax, Virginia
  - coordinates: 36°46′48″N 078°57′06″W
  - elevation: 351 ft (107 m)
- Length: 2.09 mi (3.36 km)
- Basin size: 1.98 square miles (5.1 km^{2})
- Discharge
  - location: Banister River
  - average: 2.60 cu ft/s (0.074 m^{3}/s) at mouth with Banister River

Basin features
- Progression: Banister River → Dan River → Roanoke River → Albemarle Sound → Pamlico Sound → Atlantic Ocean
- River system: Roanoke River
- Tributaries
  - left: unnamed tributaries
  - right: unnamed tributaries
- Waterbodies: Banister Lake (flows into)
- Bridges: Ball Park Loop

Kents Creek is a 2.09 mi (3.36 km) long 2nd order tributary to the Banister River in Halifax County, Virginia.

== Course ==
Kents Creek rises in a pond about 1 mile southwest of Halifax, Virginia in Halifax County and then flows northeast to join the Banister River about 1 mile northwest of Halifax.

== Watershed ==
Kents Creek drains 1.98 square miles (5.1 km^{2}) of area, receives about 45.5 in/year of precipitation, has a wetness index of 366.83, and is about 69% forested.

== See also ==
- List of Virginia Rivers
