= Gibson Creek (Banister River tributary) =

Stream in Virginia, USA

Gibson Creek Tributary to Banister River
- Location of Gibson Creek mouth Gibson Creek (Banister River tributary) (the United States)

Location
- Country: United States
- State: Virginia
- County: Halifax

Physical characteristics
- Source: Long Branch divide
  - location: about 1.5 miles northwest of Scottsburg, Virginia
  - coordinates: 36°46′40″N 078°48′50″W
  - elevation: 378 ft (115 m)
- Mouth
  - location: about 1 mile east of Wolf Trap, Virginia
  - coordinates: 36°43′09″N 078°48′01″W
  - elevation: 305 ft (93 m)
- Length: 5.26 mi (8.47 km)
- Basin size: 6.80 square miles (17.6 km^{2})
- Discharge
  - location: Banister River
  - average: 8.45 cu ft/s (0.239 m^{3}/s) at mouth with Banister River

Basin features
- Progression: Banister River → Dan River → Roanoke River → Albemarle Sound → Pamlico Sound → Atlantic Ocean
- River system: Roanoke River
- Tributaries
  - left: unnamed tributaries
  - right: unnamed tributaries
- Bridges: S Terrys Bridge Road, Wolf Trap Road

Gibson Creek is a 5.26 mi (8.47 km) long 2nd order tributary to the Banister River in Halifax County, Virginia.

== Variant names ==
According to the Geographic Names Information System, it has also been known historically as:

- Stewart Gibson Creek

== Course ==
Gibson Creek rises about 1.5 miles northwest of Scottsburg, Virginia in Halifax County and then flows south to join the Banister River about 1 mile east of Wolf Trap.

== Watershed ==
Gibson Creek drains 6.80 square miles (17.6 km^{2}) of area, receives about 45.6 in/year of precipitation, has a wetness index of 460.64, and is about 57% forested.

== See also ==
- List of Virginia Rivers
