= Virginia State Route 51 =

State highway in southern Virginia, US

State Route 51
- Westover Drive

Route information
- Maintained by VDOT
- Length: 6.20 mi (9.98 km)
- Existed: 1954–present

Major junctions
- West end: US 58 Bus. west of Danville
- East end: US 58 Bus. in Danville

Location
- Country: United States
- State: Virginia
- Counties: Pittsylvania, City of Danville

Highway system
- Virginia Routes; Interstate; US; Primary; Secondary; Byways; History; HOT lanes
| ← US 50 | → US 52 |

State Route 51 (SR 51) is a primary state highway in the U.S. state of Virginia. Known as Westover Drive, the state highway runs 6.20 miles (9.98 km) between a pair of intersections with U.S. Route 58 Business (US 58 Business) in Pittsylvania County west of Danville and within Danville. SR 51 is the original alignment of US 58 through the western part of Danville.

== Route description ==
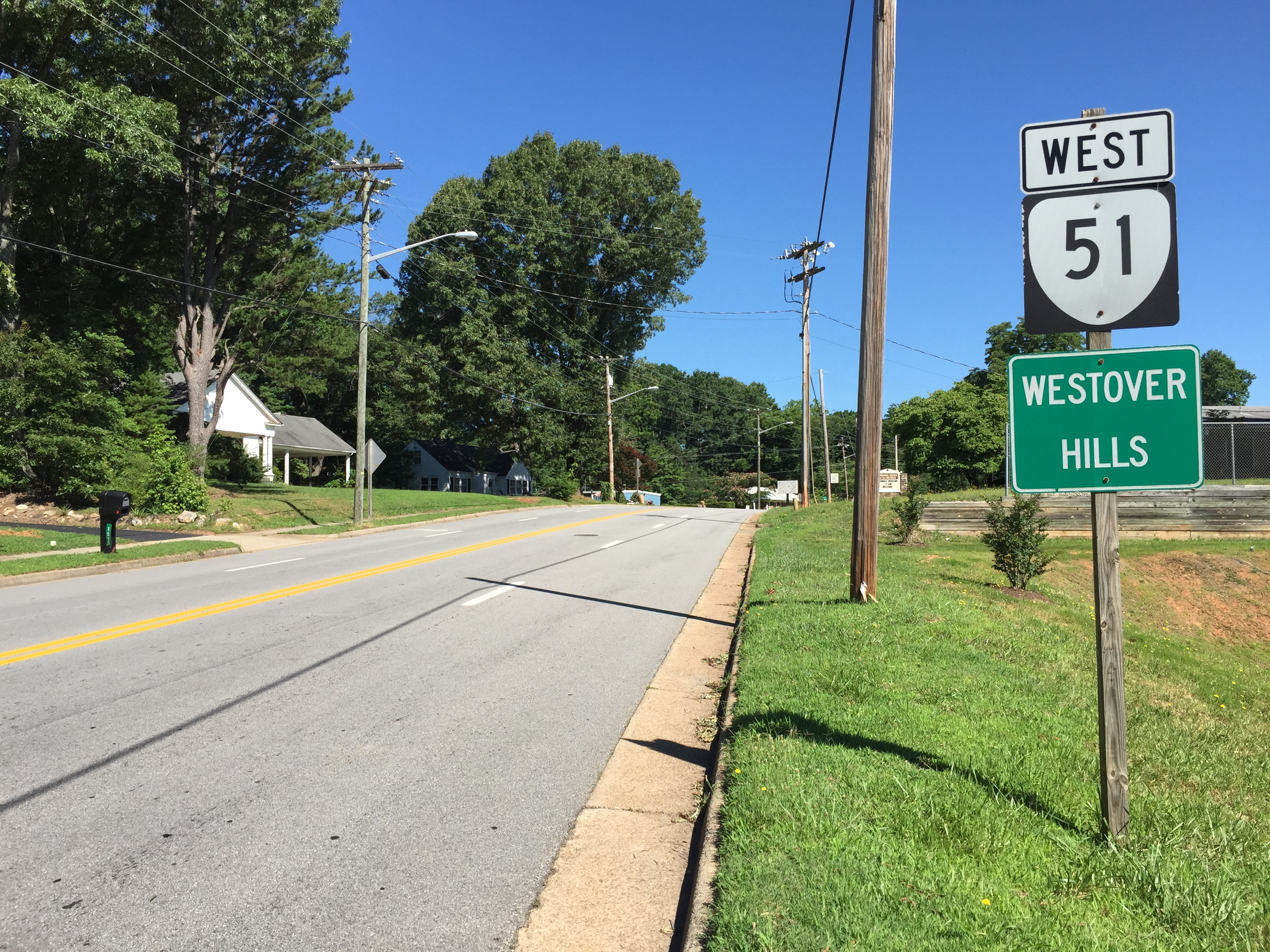
View west along SR 51 in Danville

SR 51 begins at a directional intersection on a tangent with US 58 Business (Martinsville Highway) in Pittsylvania County just west of the city of Danville. The state highway heads east into the independent city as a four-lane undivided highway that passes through the city's residential Westover Hills area. SR 51 parallels the north side of US 58 Business as the former highway follows the height of land between the Dan River to the south and the Sandy River to the north. East of Piedmont Drive, the state highway enters a commercial area where the highway reaches its eastern terminus at US 58 Business (Riverside Drive) a short distance west of the confluence of the two rivers.

== Major intersections ==
| County | Location | mi | km | Destinations | Notes |
|---|---|---|---|---|---|
| Pittsylvania | Callahans Hills | 0.00 | 0.00 | US 58 Bus. (Martinsville Highway) | Western terminus |
| City of Danville | | | | Piedmont Drive | to former SR 125 south |
| City of Danville | | 6.20 | 9.98 | US 58 Bus. (Riverside Drive) | Eastern terminus |
1.000 mi = 1.609 km; 1.000 km = 0.621 mi
