= Kentuck =

Kentuck may refer to:

- Kentuck, Alabama
- Kentuck, Virginia
- Kentuck, West Virginia

== See also ==
- Kentucky
