= Whitmell =

Whitmell is a given name. Notable people with the name include:

- Whitmell Hill (1743–1797), American planter from Martin County, North Carolina
- Whitmell P. Martin (1867–1929), U.S. Representative from Louisiana
- Whitmell P. Tunstall (1810–1854), lawyer and state legislator in Chatham, Virginia

== See also ==
- Whitmell, Virginia, unincorporated community in Pittsylvania County, in the U.S. state of Virginia
