= Mountain Hill =

Mountain Hill may refer to:

- Mountain Hill, Georgia
- Mountain Hill, Virginia
