= Hinesville, Virginia =

Unincorporated community in Virginia, US

Coordinates: 36°42′06″N 79°34′23″W

Hinesville is an unincorporated community in Pittsylvania County, in the U.S. state of Virginia.

Its Zip Code is 24549 (Dry Fork).
