= Bradley Creek (Banister River tributary) =

Stream in Virginia, USA

Bradley Creek Tributary to Banister River
- Location of Bradley Creek mouth Bradley Creek (Banister River tributary) (the United States)

Location
- Country: United States
- State: Virginia
- County: Halifax

Physical characteristics
- Source: Spider Creek divide
  - location: Volens, Virginia
  - coordinates: 36°56′33″N 079°01′31″W
  - elevation: 600 ft (180 m)
- Mouth
  - location: about 2.5 miles west-southwest of Millstone, Virginia
  - coordinates: 36°52′05″N 079°03′03″W
  - elevation: 368 ft (112 m)
- Length: 6.11 mi (9.83 km)
- Basin size: 11.17 square miles (28.9 km^{2})
- Discharge
  - location: Banister River
  - average: 13.81 cu ft/s (0.391 m^{3}/s) at mouth with Banister River

Basin features
- Progression: Banister River → Dan River → Roanoke River → Albemarle Sound → Pamlico Sound → Atlantic Ocean
- River system: Roanoke River
- Tributaries
  - left: unnamed tributaries
  - right: unnamed tributaries
- Bridges: Bradley Creek Road

Bradley Creek is a 6.11 mi (9.83 km) long 3rd order tributary to the Banister River in Halifax County, Virginia.

== Variant names ==
According to the Geographic Names Information System, it has also been known historically as:

- Bradleys Creek

== Course ==
Bradley Creek rises at Volens, Virginia in Halifax County and then flows south-southwest to join the Banister River about 2.5 miles west-southwest of Millstone.

== Watershed ==
Bradley Creek drains 11.17 square miles (28.9 km^{2}) of area, receives about 45.4 in/year of precipitation, has a wetness index of 359.85, and is about 63% forested.

== See also ==
- List of Virginia Rivers
