= Myers Creek (Banister River tributary) =

Stream in Virginia, USA

Myers Creek Tributary to Banister River
- Location of Myers Creek mouth Myers Creek (Banister River tributary) (the United States)

Location
- Country: United States
- State: Virginia
- County: Halifax

Physical characteristics
- Source: unnamed tributary to Poplar Creek divide
  - location: Loves Shop, Virginia
  - coordinates: 36°43′57″N 078°54′16″W
  - elevation: 480 ft (150 m)
- Mouth
  - location: about 4 miles northeast of South Boston, Virginia
  - coordinates: 36°44′46″N 078°51′09″W
  - elevation: 318 ft (97 m)
- Length: 3.49 mi (5.62 km)
- Basin size: 2.74 square miles (7.1 km^{2})
- Discharge
  - location: Banister River
  - average: 3.55 cu ft/s (0.101 m^{3}/s) at mouth with Banister River

Basin features
- Progression: Banister River → Dan River → Roanoke River → Albemarle Sound → Pamlico Sound → Atlantic Ocean
- River system: Roanoke River
- Tributaries
  - left: unnamed tributaries
  - right: unnamed tributaries
- Bridges: Myers Road

Myers Creek is a 3.49-mile-long (5.62 km) 2nd order tributary to the Banister River in Halifax County, Virginia.

== Course ==
Myers Creek rises at Loves Shop, Virginia in Halifax County and then flows northeast and east to join the Banister River about 4 miles northeast of South Boston.

== Watershed ==
Myers Creek drains 2.74 square miles (7.1 km^{2}) of area, receives about 45.6 in/year of precipitation, has a wetness index of 395.59, and is about 55% forested.

== See also ==
- List of Virginia Rivers
