= George Farson =

American baseball player, manager, coach, and scout

George Washington Farson III (December 29, 1939 – October 10, 2010) was an American professional baseball player, manager, coach and scout. A catcher, the native of Lynchburg, Virginia, played ten seasons (1962–1971) of minor league baseball in the Baltimore Orioles' organization before pursuing an off-field baseball career that would last through 1989. He threw and batted right-handed, stood 6 feet 1 inch (1.85 m) tall and weighed 210 pounds (95 kg).

Farson signed with the Orioles after attending Spring Garden High School and the University of Virginia. During his 718-game minor league career, which included 125 games with the Triple-A Rochester Red Wings, Farson batted .236 with 38 home runs. His managing career lasted for eight seasons in the Baltimore, Oakland Athletics and Milwaukee Brewers systems, including three seasons at the Double-A level.

In 1980 he joined the Philadelphia Phillies as a minor league catching instructor. After two seasons, he spent eight years (1982–1989) as a Phillie scout. A resident of Vernon Hill, Virginia, Farson also was an avid grouse hunter in Maine. He died in Fort Kent in October 2010 at the age of 70.
