= Laurel Grove =

Laurel Grove may refer to the following places in the United States:

- Laurel Grove, Oregon
- Laurel Grove, Pittsylvania County, Virginia

== See also ==
- Laurel Grove Plantation, near Jacksonville, Florida; owned by Zephaniah Kingsley and his wife Anna Kingsley
- Laurel Grove Cemetery in Savannah, Georgia
- Laurel Grove Colored School and Church, Franconia, Virginia
