= Stony Mill, Virginia =

Unincorporated community in Virginia, US

Coordinates: 36°38′22″N 79°32′38″W

Stony Mill is an unincorporated community in Pittsylvania County, in the U.S. state of Virginia.
