= Laniers Mill, Virginia =

Unincorporated community in Virginia, US

Coordinates: 36°39′54″N 79°27′37″W

Laniers Mill is an unincorporated community in Pittsylvania County, in the U.S. state of Virginia.
