= Roanoke Sound =

Coordinates: 35°51′48″N 75°36′31″W

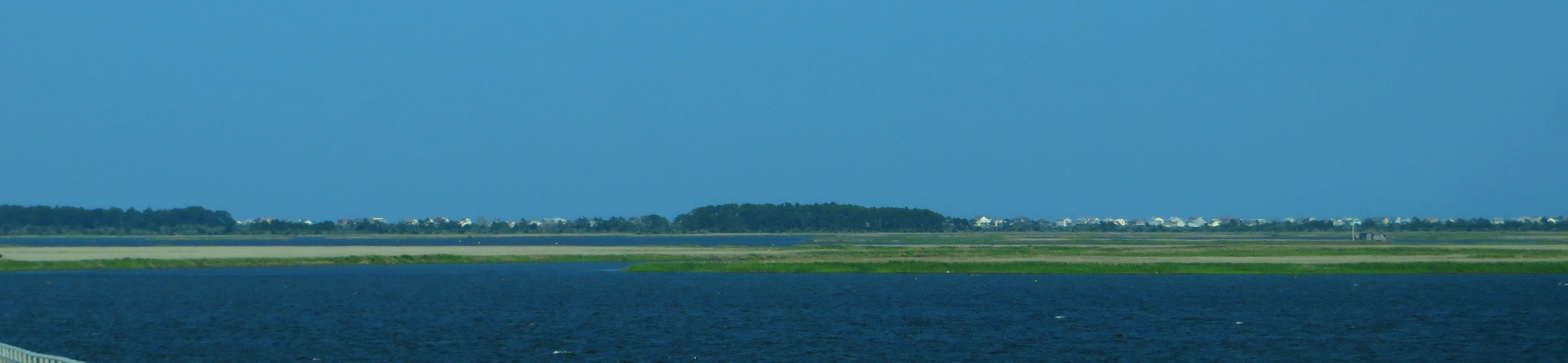
- Roanoke Sound in 2014
- Interactive map of Roanoke Sound
- Location: Dare County, North Carolina, U.S.

The Roanoke Sound is a sound that separates Roanoke Island from Bodie Island of the Outer Banks. To the north of the Roanoke Sound lies the Albemarle Sound and to the south lies the Pamlico Sound. One bridge, which carries U.S. Route 64, crosses the sound.

In a historical context, this was also the name first given to the present-day body of water known as the Albemarle Sound. That body of water was initially named the Sea of Rawnocke (Roanoke), or Roanoke Sea, by European explorers and later appeared on maps as the Roanoke Sound and then the Carolina River before it was renamed for George Monck, 1st Duke of Albemarle. North Carolina's earliest European settlements were established in this area.
