= Woodlawn, Pittsylvania County, Virginia =

Unincorporated community in Virginia, US

Coordinates: 36°48′35″N 79°23′34″W

Woodlawn, Pittsylvania County is an unincorporated community in Pittsylvania County, in the U.S. state of Virginia.
