= Vance, Virginia =

Unincorporated community in Virginia, US

Coordinates: 36°39′58″N 79°33′30″W

Vance is an unincorporated community in Pittsylvania County, in the U.S. state of Virginia.
