= Whitfield, Virginia =

Unincorporated community in Virginia, US

Coordinates: 36°32′49″N 79°28′21″W

Whitfield is an unincorporated community in Pittsylvania County, in the U.S. state of Virginia.
