= Glenland, Virginia =

Unincorporated community in Virginia, US

Coordinates: 36°59′59″N 79°13′05″W

Glenland is an unincorporated community in Pittsylvania County, in the U.S. state of Virginia.
