= Vandola, Virginia =

Unincorporated community in Virginia, US

Coordinates: 36°34′40″N 79°30′41″W

Vandola is an unincorporated community in Pittsylvania County, in the U.S. state of Virginia.
