= West Fork, Virginia =

Unincorporated community in Virginia, US

Coordinates: 36°37′28″N 79°37′51″W

West Fork is an unincorporated community in Pittsylvania County, in the U.S. state of Virginia.
