= Toshes, Virginia =

Unincorporated community in Virginia, US

Coordinates: 36°58′10″N 79°29′10″W

Toshes is an unincorporated community in Pittsylvania County, in the U.S. state of Virginia.
