= Soapstone, Virginia =

Unincorporated community in Virginia, US

Coordinates: 36°40′21″N 79°38′43″W

Soapstone is an unincorporated community in Pittsylvania County, in the U.S. state of Virginia.
