= Ray, Virginia =

Unincorporated community in Virginia, US

Coordinates: 36°56′11″N 79°18′39″W

Ray is an unincorporated community in Pittsylvania County, in the U.S. state of Virginia.
