= Cedar Forest, Virginia =

Unincorporated community in Virginia, US

Coordinates: 37°02′48″N 79°06′38″W

Cedar Forest is an unincorporated community in Pittsylvania County, in the U.S. state of Virginia.
