= Worlds, Virginia =

Unincorporated community in Virginia, US

Coordinates: 36°51′09″N 79°35′27″W

Worlds is an unincorporated community in Pittsylvania County, in the U.S. state of Virginia.
