= Level Run, Virginia =

Unincorporated community in Virginia, US

Coordinates: 37°02′24″N 79°11′57″W

Level Run is an unincorporated community in Pittsylvania County, in the U.S. state of Virginia.
