= Green Acres (disambiguation) =

Green Acres is an American comedy television series which aired from 1965 to 1971. With a reunion movie from 1990.

Green Acres or Greenacres may also refer to:

== Places ==
=== United States ===
- Green Acres, California, a census-designated place
- Green Acres, Visalia, California, a neighborhood
- Green Acres, Delaware, an unincorporated community
- Green Acres, North Dakota, a census-designated place
- Green Acres, Coos County, Oregon, an unincorporated community
- Green Acres, Virginia, an unincorporated community
- Green Acres Mall, New York City is an indoor shopping mall located in South Valley Stream, New York, off Sunrise Highway in Nassau County near the border of New York City and the Incorporated Village of Valley Stream

=== Canada ===
- Green Acres, Nova Scotia, Canada, a residential neighbourhood in Halifax
- Green Acres, a locality in Leduc County, Alberta
- Green Acres, a community in the municipality of Trent Hills, Ontario

== Other ==
- Green Acres Baptist Church, Tyler, Texas
- Green Acres Mall, in Valley Stream, New York
- Harold Lloyd Estate in Beverly Hills, California, a mansion also known as Greenacres

== See also ==
- Green Acre Baháʼí School, a conference facility in Eliot, Maine
- Greenacres (disambiguation)
