= Sandy River, Virginia =

Unincorporated community in Virginia, US

Coordinates: 36°43′23″N 79°39′05″W

Sandy River is an unincorporated community in Pittsylvania County, in the U.S. state of Virginia.
