= Bachelors Hall, Virginia =

Unincorporated community in Virginia, US

Coordinates: 36°36′11″N 79°31′52″W

Bachelors Hall is an unincorporated community in Pittsylvania County, in the U.S. state of Virginia.
