= Mount Cross, Virginia =

Unincorporated community in Virginia, US

Coordinates: 36°38′20″N 79°29′16″W

Mount Cross is an unincorporated community in Pittsylvania County, in the U.S. state of Virginia.
