= Witt, Virginia =

Unincorporated community in the U.S. state of Virginia

Coordinates: 36°40′50″N 79°23′59″W

Witt is an unincorporated community in Pittsylvania County, in the U.S. state of Virginia.
