= Lakewood, Virginia =

Unincorporated community in Virginia, US

Coordinates: 36.58069°N 79.30502°W

Lakewood is an unincorporated community in Pittsylvania County, in the U.S. state of Virginia with a population of 1,426.
