= Sharon, Virginia =

Unincorporated community in Virginia, US

Coordinates: 36°39′30″N 79°31′49″W

Sharon is an unincorporated community in Pittsylvania County, in the U.S. state of Virginia.
