= Renan, Virginia =

Unincorporated community in Virginia, US

Coordinates: 36°58′30″N 79°11′38″W

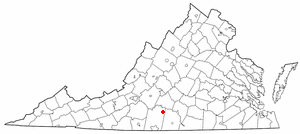
Location of Renan, Virginia

Renan is an unincorporated community in the northeastern part of Pittsylvania County, Virginia, United States. It is included in the Danville, Virginia metropolitan area. It is contained within the Staunton River Magisterial District, and is located on a crossroads between Straightstone, Mount Airy, and Hurt.

The community of Renan was named in the second half of the 19th century after Ernest Renan, French philosopher and theologian. The name of the community is pronounced with stress on the first syllable of the word, however. In the 1880s, the four-room Harmony Grove School served the area, which was then replaced by the brick Renan School. This was then closed and converted into a Virginia furniture factory.

A store served the community from 1901 until the 1980s.
