= Woodlake Park, Virginia =

Unincorporated community in Virginia, US

Coordinates: 36°38′58″N 79°22′59″W

Woodlake Park is an unincorporated community in Pittsylvania County, in the U.S. state of Virginia.
