= Transco Village, Virginia =

Unincorporated community in Virginia, US

Coordinates: 36°49′53″N 79°20′04″W

Transco Village is an unincorporated community in Pittsylvania County, in the U.S. state of Virginia.
