= Shockoe, Virginia =

Unincorporated community in Virginia, US

Coordinates: 36°48′31″N 79°15′50″W

Shockoe is an unincorporated community in Pittsylvania County, in the U.S. state of Virginia.
