= Bradley Creek (Iowa) =

Stream in Johnson County, Iowa, U.S.

Coordinates: 41°37′46″N 91°44′43″W

Bradley Creek is a stream in Johnson County, Iowa, United States. It is a tributary to North Branch Old Mans Creek.

Bradley Creek was named after Stephen and Mary Bradley, pioneer settlers.
