= Bradley Creek (Wisconsin) =

Stream in Wisconsin, U.S.

Coordinates: 44°39′06″N 89°13′14″W

Bradley Creek is a stream in the U.S. state of Wisconsin. It is a tributary to the Little Wolf River. It is unknown why the name "Bradley Creek" was applied to this stream. A variant name is "North Branch Little Wolf River".
