= Pleasant Gap, Virginia =

Unincorporated community in Virginia, US

Coordinates: 36°42′10″N 79°26′43″W

Pleasant Gap is an unincorporated community in Pittsylvania County, in the U.S. state of Virginia.
