= Climax, Virginia =

Unincorporated community in Virginia, US

Coordinates: 36°53′14″N 79°29′21″W

Climax is an unincorporated community in Pittsylvania County, in the U.S. state of Virginia.

Climax has been referenced in popular culture due to Tim Smith, who is featured on the hit show Moonshiners. Tim opened a legal distillery and now sells moonshine under the name Climax Moonshine.
