= Hollywood, Pittsylvania County, Virginia =

Unincorporated community in Virginia, US

Coordinates: 36°50′02″N 79°29′46″W

Hollywood, Pittsylvania County is an unincorporated community in Pittsylvania County, in the U.S. state of Virginia.
