= Green Pond, Virginia =

Human settlement in Virginia, United States

Coordinates: 36°52′53″N 79°30′32″W

Green Pond is an unincorporated community in Pittsylvania County, in the U.S. state of Virginia.
