= Myer Creek (Bear Creek tributary) =

- Location within Oregon Location within the United States

Physical characteristics
- Source
  - coordinates: 42.2809634°N 122.703922°W
- Mouth
  - coordinates: 42.2326297°N 122.7594785°W

Myer Creek is a stream in the U.S. state of Oregon. It is a tributary to the Bear Creek.

Myer Creek was named in the 1850s after one Nathaniel Myer.
