= Dry Fork, Pittsylvania County, Virginia =

Unincorporated community in Virginia, US

Coordinates: 36°45′16″N 79°23′59″W

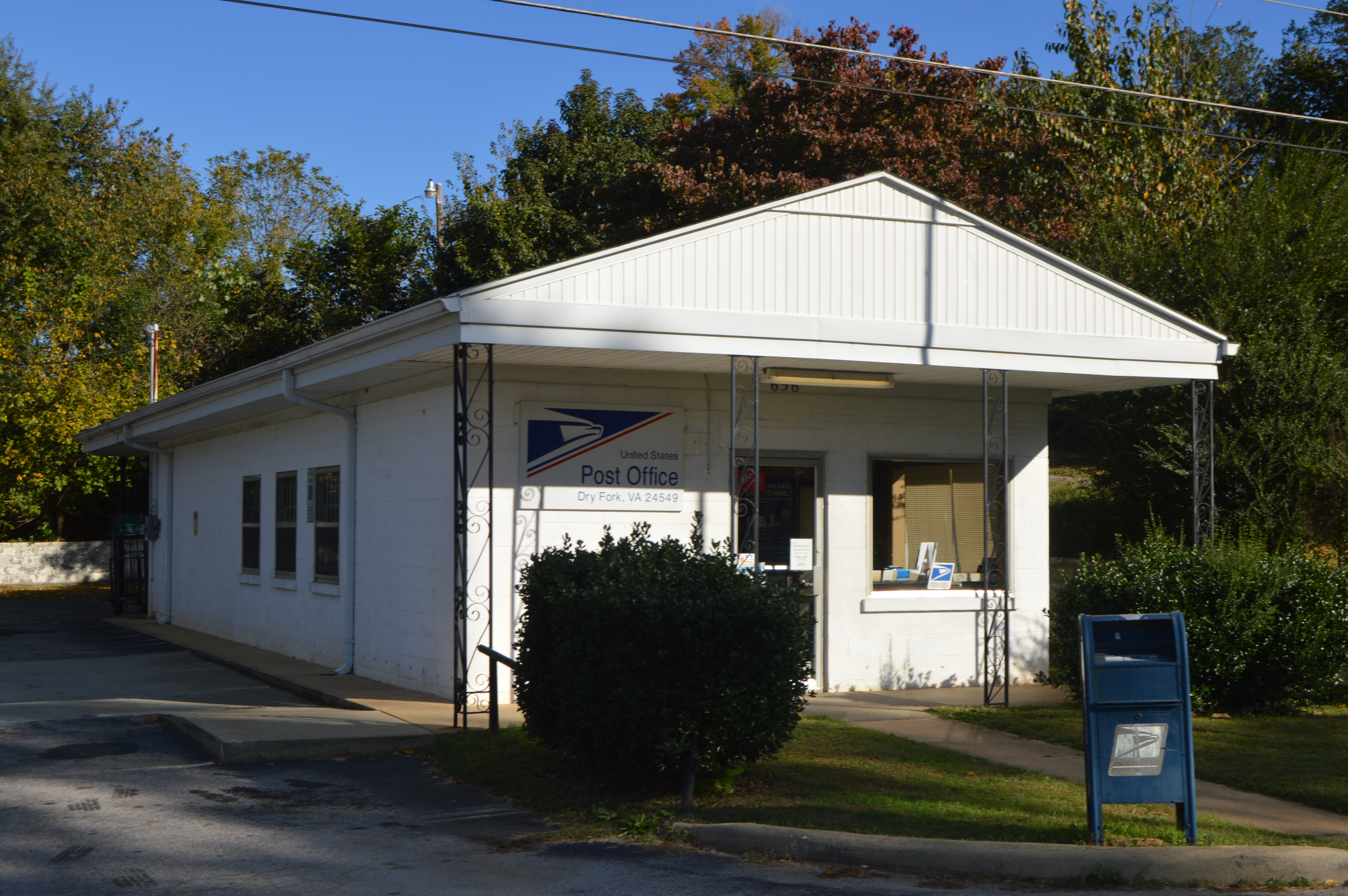
Post office

Dry Fork is an unincorporated community in Pittsylvania County, in the U.S. state of Virginia. On September 27, 2024, an EF2 tornado tore through the surrounding areas, spawned by the remnants of Hurricane Helene. The twister did not claim any lives, however, it did injure one person and destroy a mobile home.
