= Java, Virginia =

Unincorporated community in Virginia, US

Coordinates: 36°50′09″N 79°13′40″W

Java is an unincorporated community in Pittsylvania County, in the U.S. state of Virginia. Like many such communities, Java has no focal point beyond a US Post Office alongside the local volunteer fire department building. The community extends east a mile or so into Halifax County. Java contains no manufacturing operations beyond one commercial saw mill which—like local tobacco farms—is a significant employer in the area. That mill and others have increasingly been supplied by logging operations that have, potentially, been creating more farmable land through their clear-cutting practices. A downside to this clearcutting has been a loss of natural habitat for the native wildlife, including deer and bear.

Notable people include international speaker and traveler Alex "Shelly" Lisk and Minnesota Public Radio host Angela Davis.
