= Pleasant Grove, Virginia =

Unincorporated community in Virginia, US

Coordinates: 36.54458°N 79.39419°W

Pleasant Grove is an unincorporated community in Henry County in the U.S. state of Virginia. It is located at the crossroads of Stones Dairy, Hodges Farm, Preston, and Wingfield Orchard Roads. and is approximately seven miles west of Martinsville, between Horse Pasture and Bassett.
