= Greenacres =

Greenacres can refer to:

- Greenacres, California, a town in the Central Valley (United States)
- Greenacres, the legendary 1920s Harold Lloyd Estate in Beverly Hills, California (United States)
- Greenacres, Florida, town in the United States
- Greenacres, Washington, a neighborhood in the city of Spokane Valley in the United States
- Greenacres, South Australia, town in Australia
- Greenacres, neighbourhood of Motherwell, Scotland
- Greenacres, Greater Manchester, (also known as "Greenacres Moor") in Oldham, United Kingdom
- Greenacres Caravan Park, Gypsy Lane, Little Billington, near Leighton Buzzard, Bedfordshire, England: the scene of a major police operation on Sunday 11 September 2011
- Greenacres Foundation, the estate of Louis and Louise Nippert near Cincinnati, Ohio.

== See also ==
- Green Acres (disambiguation)
