= Greenacre (surname) =

Greenacre is a surname. Notable people with the surname include:

- Benjamin Wesley Greenacre, South African politician
- Chris Greenacre (born 1977), English footballer and manager
- James Greenacre (1785–1837), English murderer
- Phyllis Greenacre (1894–1989), American psychoanalyst and physician
