= Kentuck, Virginia =

Unincorporated community in Virginia, US

Coordinates: 36°39′35″N 79°17′54″W

Kentuck is an unincorporated community in Pittsylvania County, in the U.S. state of Virginia. The elevation is 741 feet.
