= Green Acres, Virginia =

Unincorporated community in Virginia, US

Coordinates: 36.57875°N 79.35030°W

Green Acres is an unincorporated community in Pittsylvania County, in the U.S. state of Virginia.
