= Mountain Hill, Virginia =

Unincorporated community in Virginia, US

Coordinates: 36°33′25″N 79°19′07″W

Mountain Hill is an unincorporated community in Pittsylvania County, in the U.S. state of Virginia.
