= Laurel Grove, Pittsylvania County, Virginia =

Unincorporated community in Virginia, US

Coordinates: 36°40′43″N 79°12′47″W

Laurel Grove, Pittsylvania County is an unincorporated community in Pittsylvania County, in the U.S. state of Virginia that once included a post office.
