= Riceville, Virginia =

Unincorporated community in Virginia, US

Coordinates: 36°53′28″N 79°10′08″W

Riceville is an unincorporated community in Pittsylvania County, in the U.S. state of Virginia.
