= Callahans Hills, Virginia =

Unincorporated community in Pittsylvania County, Virginia

Coordinates: 36°36′15″N 79°31′07″W

Callahans Hills is an unincorporated community in Pittsylvania County, in the U.S. state of Virginia.
