= Motleys Mill, Virginia =

Unincorporated community in Pittsylvania County, Virginia

Coordinates: 36°49′19″N 79°18′40″W

Motleys Mill is an unincorporated community in Pittsylvania County, in the U.S. state of Virginia.
