= Redeye, Virginia =

Unincorporated community in Virginia, US

Coordinates: 36°54′19″N 79°28′34″W

Redeye is an unincorporated community in Pittsylvania County, in the U.S. state of Virginia.
