= Straightstone, Virginia =

Unincorporated community in Virginia, US

Coordinates: 37°00′58″N 79°08′58″W

Straightstone is an unincorporated community in Pittsylvania County, in the U.S. state of Virginia.
