= Spring Garden, Virginia =

Unincorporated community in Virginia, US

Coordinates: 36.78041°N 79.30474°W

Spring Garden is an unincorporated community in Pittsylvania County, in the U.S. state of Virginia.
