= Whitmell, Virginia =

Unincorporated community in Virginia, U.S.

Whitmell
- unincorporated community
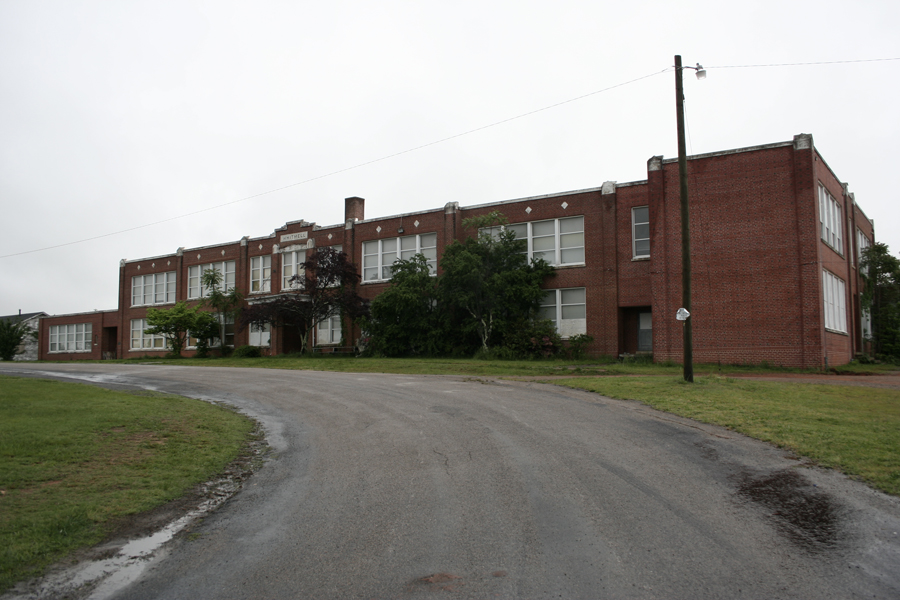
- Whitmell Farm-Life School in Pittsylvania County, Virginia

- Location within Virginia and the United States Whitmell (the United States)
- Coordinates: 36°42′08″N 79°31′25″W
- Country: United States
- State: Virginia
- County: Pittsylvania
- Named for: Whitmell P. Tunstall
- Time zone: UTC−5 (Eastern (EST))
  - Summer (DST): UTC−4 (EDT)

Whitmell is an unincorporated community in Pittsylvania County, in the U.S. state of Virginia. It is the location of the now-closed historic Whitmell Farm-Life School named for Whitmell P. Tunstall, a lawyer and state legislator.

It was originally named Chestnut Grove. An 1855 gazetteer listed the village as having "3 stores, several tobacco factories, and about 100 inhabitants".
