= Weal, Virginia =

Unincorporated community in Virginia, US

Coordinates: 36°49′30″N 79°27′27″W

Weal is an unincorporated community in Pittsylvania County, in the U.S. state of Virginia.
