= Rondo, Virginia =

Unincorporated community in Virginia, US

Coordinates: 36°49′43″N 79°31′54″W

Rondo is an unincorporated community in Pittsylvania County, in the U.S. state of Virginia. Hemp Fork, a tributary to Bearskin Creek, rises northeast of Rondo.
