= Banister, Virginia =

Unincorporated community in Virginia, US

Coordinates: 36°46′18″N 79°32′03″W

Banister is an unincorporated community and district in Pittsylvania County, in the U.S. state of virginia.
