= Hermosa, Virginia =

Unincorporated community in Virginia, US

Coordinates: 36°56′25″N 79°07′17″W

Hermosa is an unincorporated community in Halifax County and Pittsylvania County, in the U.S. state of Virginia.
