= Banister River =

Stream in Virginia, USA

Banister River Tributary to Dan River
- Location of Banister River mouth Banister River (the United States)

Location
- Country: United States
- State: Virginia
- County: Halifax; Pittsylvania

Physical characteristics
- Source: Tomahawk Creek divide
  - location: about 1.5 miles northeast of Callands, Virginia
  - coordinates: 36°50′06″N 079°34′17″W
  - elevation: 980 ft (300 m)
- Mouth: Dan River
  - location: about 2 miles north-northeast of Omega, Virginia
  - coordinates: 36°41′59″N 078°48′09″W
  - elevation: 300 ft (91 m)
- Length: 78.77 mi (126.77 km)
- Basin size: 596.77 square miles (1,545.6 km^{2})
- Discharge
  - location: Dan River
  - average: 591.86 cu ft/s (16.760 m^{3}/s) at mouth with Dan River

Basin features
- Progression: Dan River → Roanoke River → Albemarle Sound → Pamlico Sound → Atlantic Ocean
- River system: Roanoke River
- Tributaries
  - left: Robins Branch, Bearskin Creek, Cherrystone Creek, Whitethorn Creek, Stinking River, Allen Creek, Brush Creek, Runaway Creek, Bradley Creek, Terrible Creek, Winn Creek, Gibson Creek
  - right: Mitchell Branch, Wet Sleeve Creek, Strawberry Creek, Pudding Creek, White Oak Creek, Shockoe Creek, Bird Creek, Squirrel Creek, Elkhorn Creek, Bye Creek, Sandy Creek, Polecat Creek, Kents Creek, Toots Creek, Myers Creek, Wolf Trap Creek
- Waterbodies: Banister Lake; John H. Kerr Reservoir
- Bridges: N Briar Mountain Road, Berry Road, VA 57, Elm Road, Glenview Drive, Strawberry Road, Banister Road, Irish Road, US 29, Dairy View Road, Halifax Road, McCormick Road, Riceville Road, Leda Road, Meadsville Road, Bethel Road, US 360

The Banister River is a tributary of the Dan River, about 65 mi (105 km) long, in southern Virginia in the United States. Via the Dan, it is part of the watershed of the Roanoke River, which flows to the Atlantic Ocean. It rises on Brier Mountain in western Pittsylvania County and flows generally eastwardly into Halifax County, past the town of Halifax. It joins the Dan River 6 mi (9.7 km) east of the town of South Boston.

In Pittsylvania County the Banister collects the Stinking River.

== Variant names ==
According to the Geographic Names Information System, it has also been known historically as:

- Bannister River

== See also ==
- List of Virginia rivers
