= Pittsylvania County, Virginia =

County in Virginia, United States

- County
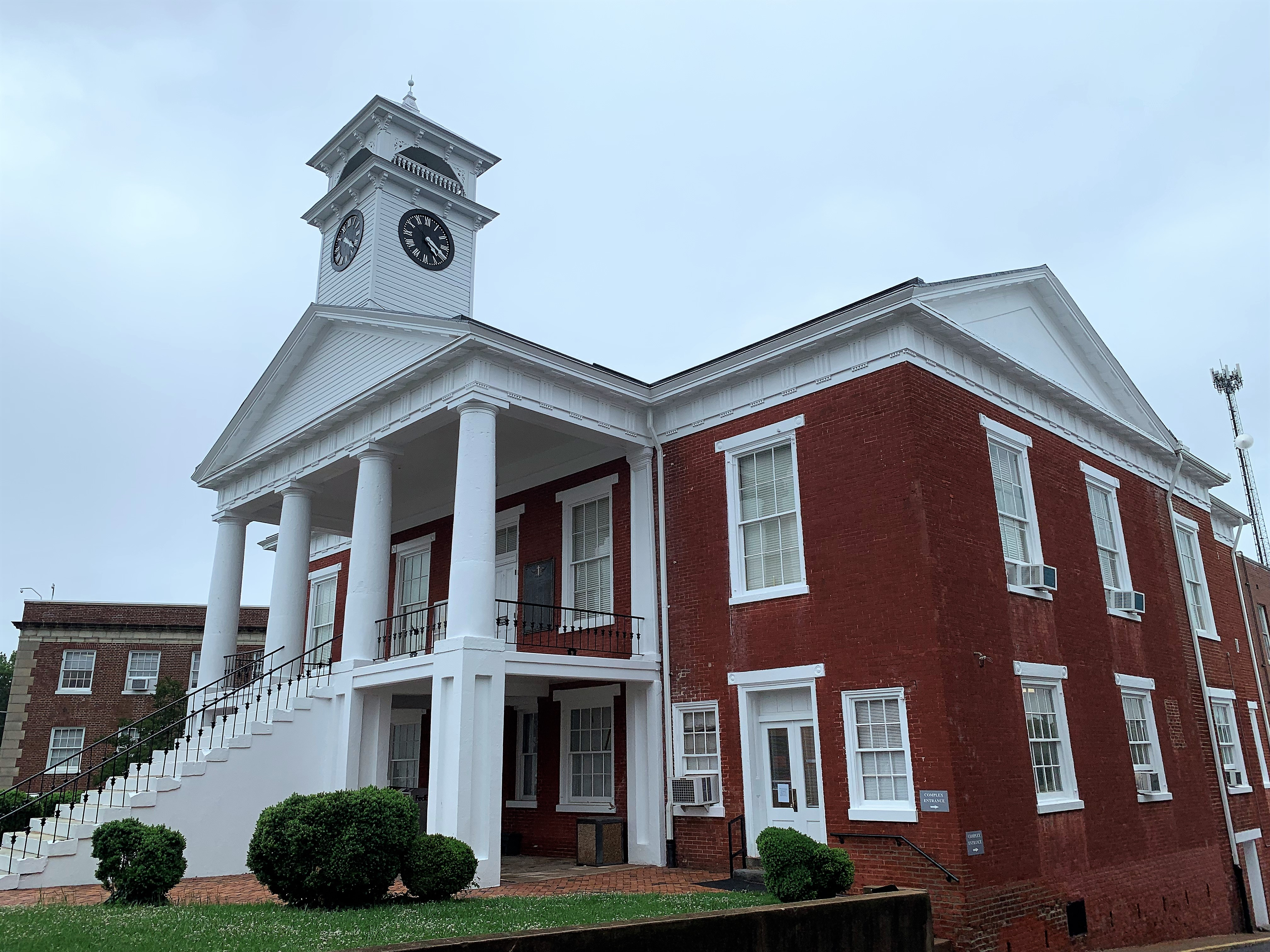
- Pittsylvania County Courthouse

- Seal

- Location within the U.S. state of Virginia
- Coordinates: 36°49′N 79°24′W
- Country: United States
- State: Virginia
- Founded: 1767
- Named for: William Pitt
- Seat: Chatham
- Largest town: Chatham

Area
  - Total: 978 sq mi (2,530 km^{2})
  - Land: 969 sq mi (2,510 km^{2})
  - Water: 9 sq mi (23 km^{2}) 0.9%

Population (2020)
  - Total: 60,501
  - Estimate (2025): 59,490 ▼
  - Density: 62/sq mi (24/km^{2})
- Time zone: UTC−5 (Eastern)
  - Summer (DST): UTC−4 (EDT)
- Congressional district: 5th
- Website: www.pittsylvaniacountyva.gov

Pittsylvania County is a county located in the Commonwealth of Virginia, United States. At the 2020 census, the population was 60,501. The county seat is Chatham.

Pittsylvania County is included in the Danville, VA Micropolitan Statistical Area.

The Coles Hill uranium deposit, the largest undeveloped uranium deposit in the United States (seventh largest in the world) is located in Pittsylvania County. (see Uranium mining in Virginia.)

== History ==
Originally "Pittsylvania" was a name suggested for an unrealized British colony to be located primarily in what is now West Virginia. Pittsylvania County would not have been within this proposed colony, which subsequently was named Vandalia.

Pittsylvania County was formed in 1767 with territory annexed from Halifax County. It was named for William Pitt, 1st Earl of Chatham, who served as Prime Minister of Great Britain from 1766 to 1768, and who opposed some harsh colonial policies of the period.

In 1777 the western part of Pittsylvania County was partitioned off to become Patrick Henry County.

Maud Clement's History of Pittsylvania County notes the following: "Despite the settlers' intentions, towns failed to develop for two reasons: the generally low level of economic activity in the area and the competition from plantation settlements already providing the kind of marketing and purchasing services typically offered by a town. Plantation settlements along the rivers, particularly at ferrying points, became commercial centers. The most important for early Pittsylvania was that of Sam Pannill, a Scots-Irishman, who at the end of the eighteenth century, while still a young man, set up a plantation town at Green Hill on the north side of the Staunton River in Campbell County. (Clement 15)

"Its economy was tobacco-dominated and reliant on a growing slave labor force. It was a county without towns or a commercial center. Plantation villages on the major river thoroughfares were the only centers of trade, until the emergence of Danville. (Clement 23)"

The city of Danville's history up through the antebellum period overall is an expression of the relationship between the town and the planters who influenced its development.

== Geography ==
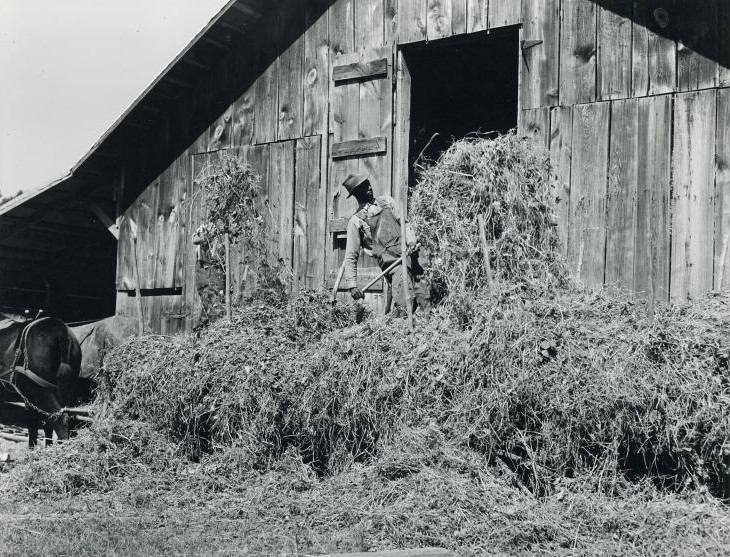
Loading hay, Blairs, Pittsylvania County, 1939. Marion Post Wolcott

According to the United States Census Bureau, the county has a total area of 978 square miles (2,530 km^{2}), of which 969 square miles (2,510 km^{2}) is land and 9 square miles (23 km^{2}) (0.9%) is water. It is the largest county in Virginia by land area and second-largest by total area. The county is bounded on the north by the Roanoke River (this stretch of the river is known as the Staunton River), bisected by the Banister River running eastward through the center, and is drained on the south by the Dan River, flowing eastward.

=== Districts ===
The county is divided into seven districts:

- Banister
- Callands-Gretna
- Chatham-Blairs
- Dan River
- Staunton River
- Tunstall
- Westover

=== Adjacent counties and cities ===
In Virginia:

- Bedford County - Northwest (across Smith Mountain Lake)
- Campbell County - North/Northeast
- Franklin County - West/Northwest
- Halifax County - East
- Henry County - West/Southwest
- Danville - South (independent city on North Carolina border, but otherwise surrounded by Pittsylvania County)

In North Carolina:

- Caswell County, North Carolina - South/Southeast
- Rockingham County, North Carolina - South/Southwest

=== Major highways ===
- US 29
- US 58
- US 311
- US 360
- SR 40
- SR 41
- SR 51
- SR 57
- SR 360

== Demographics ==
Historical population
Census	Pop.	Note	%±
1790	11,579		—
1800	12,697		9.7%
1810	17,172		35.2%
1820	21,323		24.2%
1830	26,034		22.1%
1840	26,398		1.4%
1850	28,796		9.1%
1860	32,104		11.5%
1870	31,343		−2.4%
1880	52,589		67.8%
1890	59,941		14.0%
1900	46,894		−21.8%
1910	50,709		8.1%
1920	56,493		11.4%
1930	61,424		8.7%
1940	61,697		0.4%
1950	66,096		7.1%
1960	58,296		−11.8%
1970	58,789		0.8%
1980	66,147		12.5%
1990	55,655		−15.9%
2000	61,745		10.9%
2010	63,506		2.9%
2020	60,501		−4.7%
2025 (est.)	59,490	▼	−1.7%
US Decennial Census; 1790-1960 1900-1990; 1990-2000 2010 2020

=== Racial and ethnic composition ===
Pittsylvania County, Virginia – Racial and ethnic composition Note: the US Census treats Hispanic/Latino as an ethnic category. This table excludes Latinos from the racial categories and assigns them to a separate category. Hispanics/Latinos may be of any race.
Race / Ethnicity (NH = Non-Hispanic)	Pop 1980	Pop 1990	Pop 2000	Pop 2010	Pop 2020	% 1980	% 1990	% 2000	% 2010	% 2020
White alone (NH)	45,844	40,443	45,921	47,250	44,277	69.31%	72.67%	74.37%	74.40%	73.18%
Black or African American alone (NH)	19,720	14,867	14,525	13,963	12,354	29.81%	26.71%	23.52%	21.99%	20.42%
Native American or Alaska Native alone (NH)	25	43	82	124	93	0.04%	0.08%	0.13%	0.20%	0.15%
Asian alone (NH)	53	62	111	176	289	0.08%	0.11%	0.18%	0.28%	0.48%
Native Hawaiian or Pacific Islander alone (NH)	x	x	3	17	17	x	x	0.00%	0.03%	0.03%
Other race alone (NH)	22	1	13	42	128	0.03%	0.00%	0.02%	0.07%	0.21%
Mixed race or Multiracial (NH)	x	x	331	602	1,631	x	x	0.54%	0.95%	2.70%
Hispanic or Latino (any race)	483	239	759	1,332	1,712	0.73%	0.43%	1.23%	2.10%	2.83%
Total	66,147	55,655	61,745	63,506	60,501	100.00%	100.00%	100.00%	100.00%	100.00%

=== 2020 census ===
As of the 2020 census, the county had a population of 60,501. The median age was 47.3 years. 19.4% of residents were under the age of 18 and 23.1% of residents were 65 years of age or older. For every 100 females there were 97.8 males, and for every 100 females age 18 and over there were 96.9 males age 18 and over.

The racial makeup of the county was 73.8% White, 20.5% Black or African American, 0.3% American Indian and Alaska Native, 0.5% Asian, 0.0% Native Hawaiian and Pacific Islander, 1.3% from some other race, and 3.5% from two or more races. Hispanic or Latino residents of any race comprised 2.8% of the population.

10.9% of residents lived in urban areas, while 89.1% lived in rural areas.

There were 25,315 households in the county, of which 25.3% had children under the age of 18 living with them and 28.0% had a female householder with no spouse or partner present. About 29.6% of all households were made up of individuals and 14.8% had someone living alone who was 65 years of age or older.

There were 29,369 housing units, of which 13.8% were vacant. Among occupied housing units, 75.8% were owner-occupied and 24.2% were renter-occupied. The homeowner vacancy rate was 1.6% and the rental vacancy rate was 7.3%.

=== 2010 census ===
According to the 2010 United States census, there are 60,949 people, and 26,687 households in the county. The population density was 65.5 people per square mile (25.3 people/km^{2}). There were 31,656 housing units at an average density of 32 units per square mile (12 units/km^{2}).

There were 26,687 households, out of which 30.40% had children under the age of 18 living with them. The average household size was 2.28 and the average family size was 2.93.

The median income for a household in the county was $44,356. The per capita income for the county was $23,597. About 12.60% of the population were below the poverty line.

== Government ==
Pittsylvania County is governed by an elected seven-member Board of Supervisors. Management of the county is vested in a Board-appointed County Administrator.

Pittsylvania County Board of Supervisors
Name	Party	First Election	District
Ken Bowman	Rep	2023	Chatham-Blairs
Darrell Dalton	Ind	2021	Callands-Gretna
Robert M. Tucker Jr. (Chair)	Ind	2022	Banister
Justin Brown	Rep	2025	Dan River
Tim Dudley	Rep	2019	Staunton River
William 'Vic' Ingram (Vice Chair)	Ind	2019	Tunstall
Murray Whittle	Ind	2023	Westover

There are also five elected Constitutional Officers:

- Clerk of the Circuit Court: Angie Reece Harris (R)
- Commonwealth's Attorney: Robert Bryan Haskins (R)
- Sheriff: Michael "Mike" Taylor (I)
- Commissioner of Revenue: Robin Goard (I)
- Treasurer: Vanessa Scearce (R)

== Politics ==
Pittsylvania County is a Republican stronghold. The last Democrat to carry the county was John F. Kennedy in 1960 (although Independent candidate George Wallace won it in 1968).

United States presidential election results for Pittsylvania County, Virginia
Year	Republican		Democratic		Third party(ies)	
Year	No.	%	No.	%	No.	%
1912	527	21.72%	1,558	64.22%	341	14.06%
1916	801	28.08%	2,012	70.52%	40	1.40%
1920	1,162	29.83%	2,715	69.69%	19	0.49%
1924	880	24.75%	2,563	72.08%	113	3.18%
1928	2,598	60.62%	1,688	39.38%	0	0.00%
1932	656	17.08%	3,124	81.35%	60	1.56%
1936	556	13.07%	3,694	86.82%	5	0.12%
1940	728	16.34%	3,710	83.28%	17	0.38%
1944	1,224	25.91%	3,492	73.92%	8	0.17%
1948	1,164	20.54%	3,149	55.58%	1,353	23.88%
1952	2,893	41.93%	3,976	57.62%	31	0.45%
1956	2,870	36.82%	4,136	53.07%	788	10.11%
1960	3,788	47.62%	4,089	51.41%	77	0.97%
1964	7,120	57.54%	5,228	42.25%	25	0.20%
1968	5,096	25.62%	5,427	27.29%	9,367	47.09%
1972	12,108	72.34%	4,429	26.46%	200	1.19%
1976	9,173	51.21%	7,929	44.26%	811	4.53%
1980	12,022	59.28%	7,653	37.74%	605	2.98%
1984	15,743	66.08%	7,791	32.70%	290	1.22%
1988	12,229	63.69%	6,612	34.44%	360	1.87%
1992	11,467	52.38%	7,675	35.06%	2,752	12.57%
1996	12,127	55.85%	7,681	35.37%	1,906	8.78%
2000	15,760	64.98%	7,834	32.30%	661	2.73%
2004	17,673	64.46%	9,274	33.83%	470	1.71%
2008	18,730	61.55%	11,415	37.51%	288	0.95%
2012	19,263	62.78%	10,858	35.39%	560	1.83%
2016	21,554	68.21%	9,199	29.11%	845	2.67%
2020	23,751	69.39%	10,115	29.55%	361	1.05%
2024	24,310	71.17%	9,599	28.10%	247	0.72%

== Communities ==
=== Incorporated towns ===
- Chatham
- Gretna
- Hurt

=== Census-designated places ===
- Blairs
- Motley
- Mount Hermon

=== Other unincorporated communities ===
- Ajax
- Bachelors Hall
- Banister
- Beaver Park
- Brosville
- Brights
- Brutus
- Buford
- Callahans Hills
- Callands
- Cartersville
- Cascade
- Cedar Forest
- Cedar Hill
- Chalk Level
- Climax
- Coles Hill
- Dry Fork
- Dundee
- Ebenezer
- Flint Hill
- Galveston
- Glenland
- Grady
- Green Acres
- Green Pond
- Greenfield
- Grit
- Henrys Mill
- Hermosa
- Hill Grove
- Hinesville
- Hollywood
- Hopewell
- Java
- Keeling
- Kentuck
- Lakewood
- Laniers Mill
- Laurel Grove
- Leaksville Junction
- Level Run
- Lucks
- Markham
- Motleys Mill
- Mount Airy
- Mount Cross
- Mountain Hill
- Museville
- Natal
- Peytonsburg
- Pickaway
- Pickerel
- Pittsville
- Pleasant Gap
- Pleasant Grove
- Pullens
- Ray
- Red Oak Hollow
- Redeye
- Renan
- Riceville
- Ridgeway
- Ringgold
- Rondo
- Sandy River
- Sharon
- Sheva
- Shockoe
- Soapstone
- Sonans
- Spring Garden
- Stony Mill
- Straightstone
- Sutherlin
- Swansonville
- Sycamore
- Tightsqueeze
- Toshes
- Transco Village
- Weal
- West Fork
- Whitfield
- Whitmell
- Whittles
- Witt
- Woodlake Park
- Woodlawn
- Worlds
- Vance
- Vandola

== See also ==
- List of Virginia counties
- National Register of Historic Places listings in Pittsylvania County, Virginia
- Uranium mining in the US, Virginia
