= Pamlico Sound =

Largest lagoon along the North American East Coast

Coordinates: 35°18′46″N 75°56′14″W

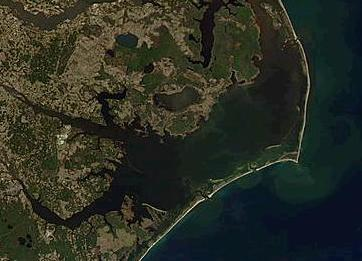
- Pamlico Sound with the southern Outer Banks. Orbital photo courtesy of NASA.
- Interactive map of Pamlico Sound
- Location: North Carolina, U.S.

Pamlico Sound (/ˈpæmlɪkoʊ/ PAM-lik-oh) is a large estuarine lagoon in North Carolina. The largest lagoon along the North American East Coast, it extends 80 mi (130 km) long and 15 to 20 miles (24 to 32 km) wide. It is part of a large, interconnected network of similar lagoons that includes Albemarle Sound, Currituck Sound, Croatan Sound, Roanoke Sound, Pamlico Sound, Bogue Sound, Back Sound, and Core Sound known collectively as the Albemarle-Pamlico sound system. With over 3,000 sq. mi. (7,800 km^{2}) of open water the combined estuary is second only in size to the 4,479 sq mi (11,600 km^{2}) Chesapeake Bay in the United States.

The Pamlico Sound is separated from the Atlantic Ocean by the Outer Banks, a row of low, sandy barrier islands that include Cape Hatteras National Seashore, Cape Lookout National Seashore, and Pea Island National Wildlife Refuge. The Albemarle-Pamlico Sound is one of nineteen great waters recognized by the America's Great Waters Coalition.

== Hydrology ==
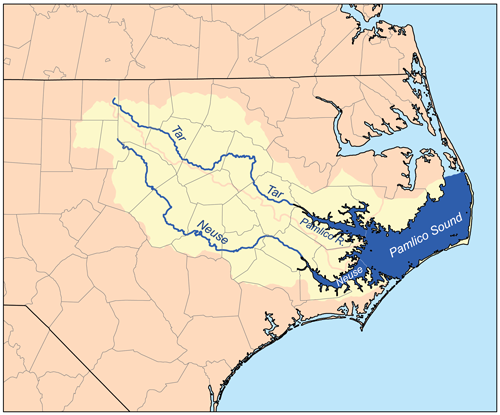
Map of the Pamlico Sound and its watershed

Pamlico Sound is connected to the north with Albemarle Sound through passages provided by the Roanoke Sound and Croatan Sound. Core Sound is located at the Pamlico's narrow southern end. It is fed by the Neuse and Pamlico rivers (the latter of which is the estuary of the Tar River) from the west, and from the east by Oregon Inlet, Hatteras Inlet, and Ocracoke Inlet, which also provide passage to the Atlantic Ocean. The salinity of the sound averages 20 ppt, compared to an average coastal salinity of 35 ppt in the Atlantic and 3 ppt in the Currituck Sound, which is located north of the Albemarle Sound.

The sound and its ocean inlets are noted for wide expanses of shallow water and occasional shoaling, making the area hazardous for larger vessels. While the deepest hole of the estuary (26 ft; 7.9 m) can be found in the Pamlico Sound, depths generally range from 5 to 6 feet (1.5 to 1.8 m). In addition, the shallow waters are susceptible to wind and barometric pressure-driven tidal fluctuations. This effect is amplified on the tributary rivers, where water levels can change by as much as two feet in three hours when winds are aligned with the rivers' axes and are blowing strongly.

== History and current use ==
In March 1524, Florentine explorer Giovanni da Verrazzano mistook the sound for the Pacific Ocean because of its wide expanse and separation from the Atlantic Ocean by the Outer Banks barrier islands. The sound was named for the Pamlico that lived along the sound's mainland banks and who were referred to as the Pamouik by the Raleigh expeditions (circa 1584).

Three locations of Pamlico Sound in the Outer Banks between Cape Hatteras and Cape Fear were once under serious consideration by the United States Atomic Energy Commission as an atomic bomb test site during the late 1940s and early 1950s. Portions of Pamlico Sound are used as a bombing and training range for Camp Lejeune.

In 1987, Congress declared the Albemarle-Pamlico Sound an "estuary of national significance." For vacationers to the Outer Banks, the Pamlico Sound is a "watersports playground" providing opportunities for fishing and crabbing, boating, kayaking, sailing, windsurfing, kiteboarding, parasailing, paddleboarding, and more. In 2012, the economic impact of tourism to the Albemarle-Pamlico Sound area exceeded $1.3 billion.

The sound also supports local commercial fishing, crabbing, shrimping, clamming, and oystering. 90% of North Carolina's commercial fishing catches are attributed to the Pamlico Sound, generating almost $100 million per year.

== Wildlife ==
Along the coastal areas are numerous waterfowl nesting sites, including Pea Island National Wildlife Refuge on the Outer Banks, and Swanquarter National Wildlife Refuge on the mainland. Dolphins and sea turtles are abundant, with occasional visits by seals such as harp seal in early January and February. Many other cetaceans including rare species such as fin whales, Cuvier's beaked whales, and orcas are present off Outer Banks and Cape Hatteras. Whales such as Atlantic gray (now extirpated), North Atlantic right (critically endangered), and North Atlantic humpback were historically common. Endangered species such as leatherback turtles, whale sharks, and basking sharks are also known to visit the sound as well.

The sound also sports a variety of fish populations including red drum, speckled trout, flounder, striped bass (known as rockfish by local populations), croaker, spot, pompano, kingfish, and bluefish. In addition, shellfish populations including blue crab, shrimp, oysters, and clams are healthy.

== Gallery ==
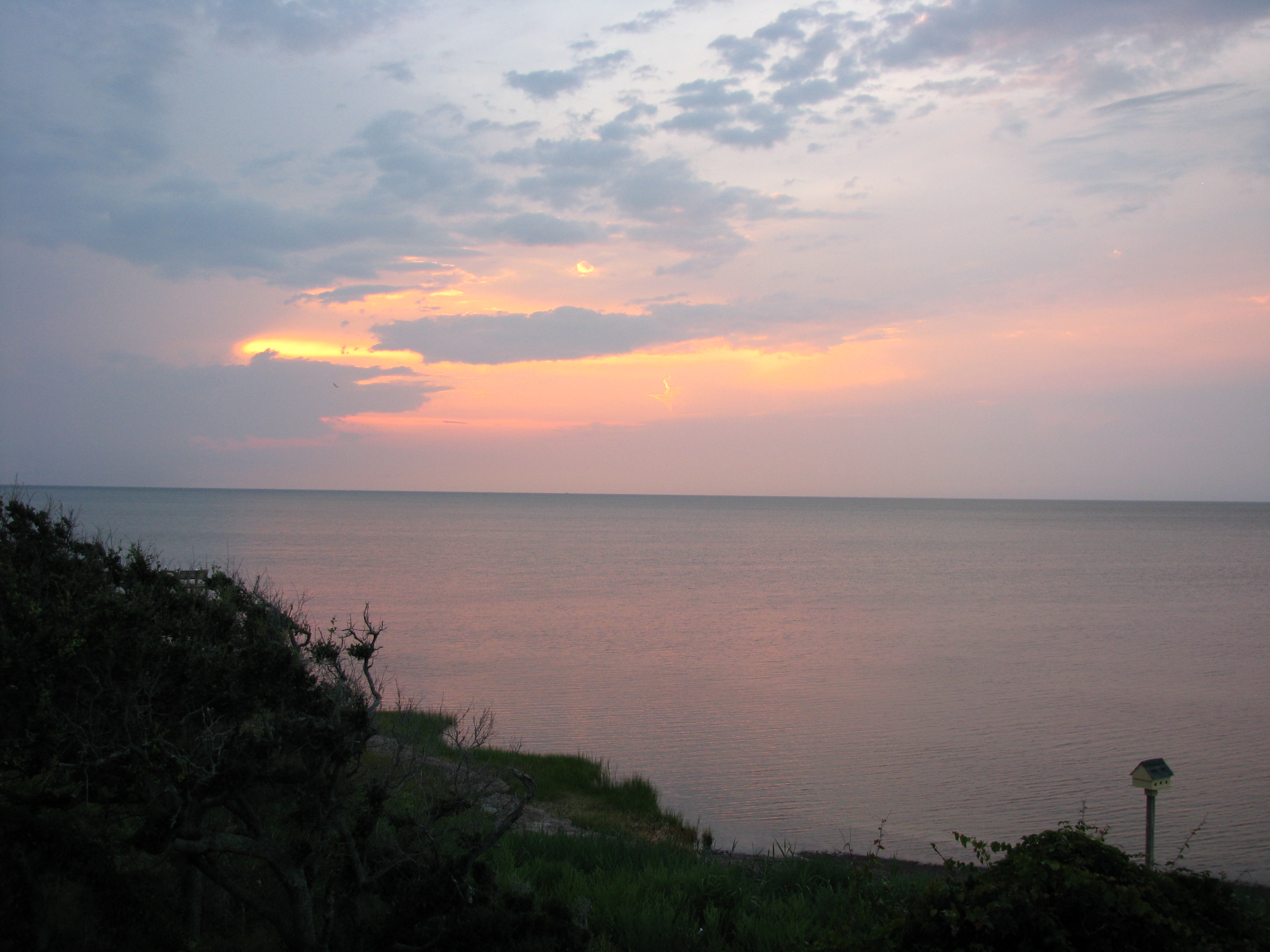
A sunset on Pamlico Sound as seen from The Inn on Pamlico Sound in Buxton, North Carolina.

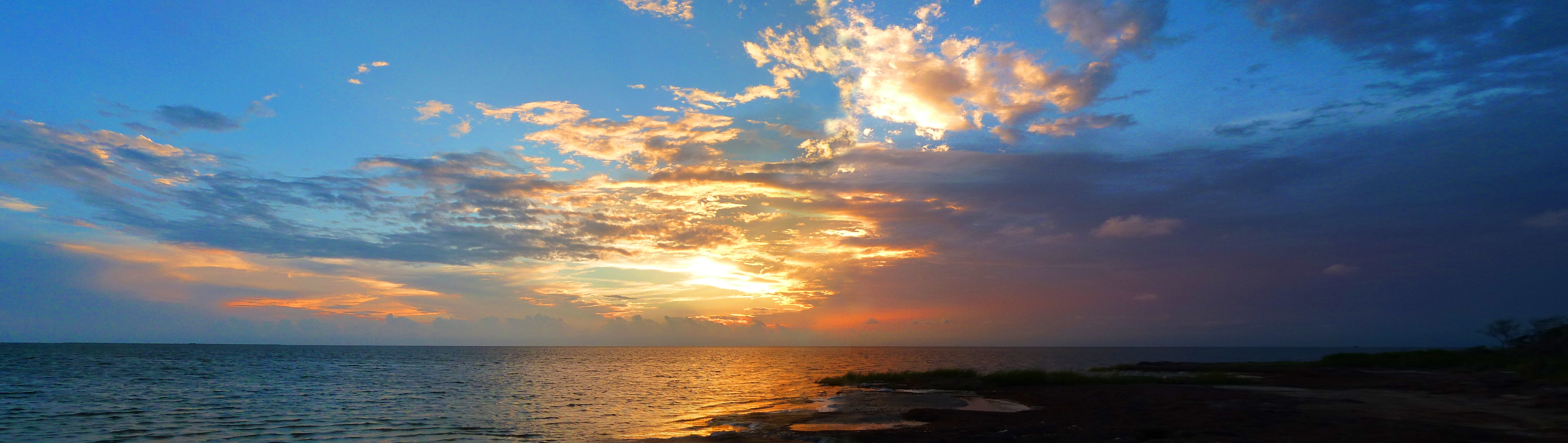
Sunset over the Sound just south of Salvo, North Carolina.
