= Albemarle Sound =

Estuary in North Carolina, United States

Coordinates: 36.06520°N 76.06453°W

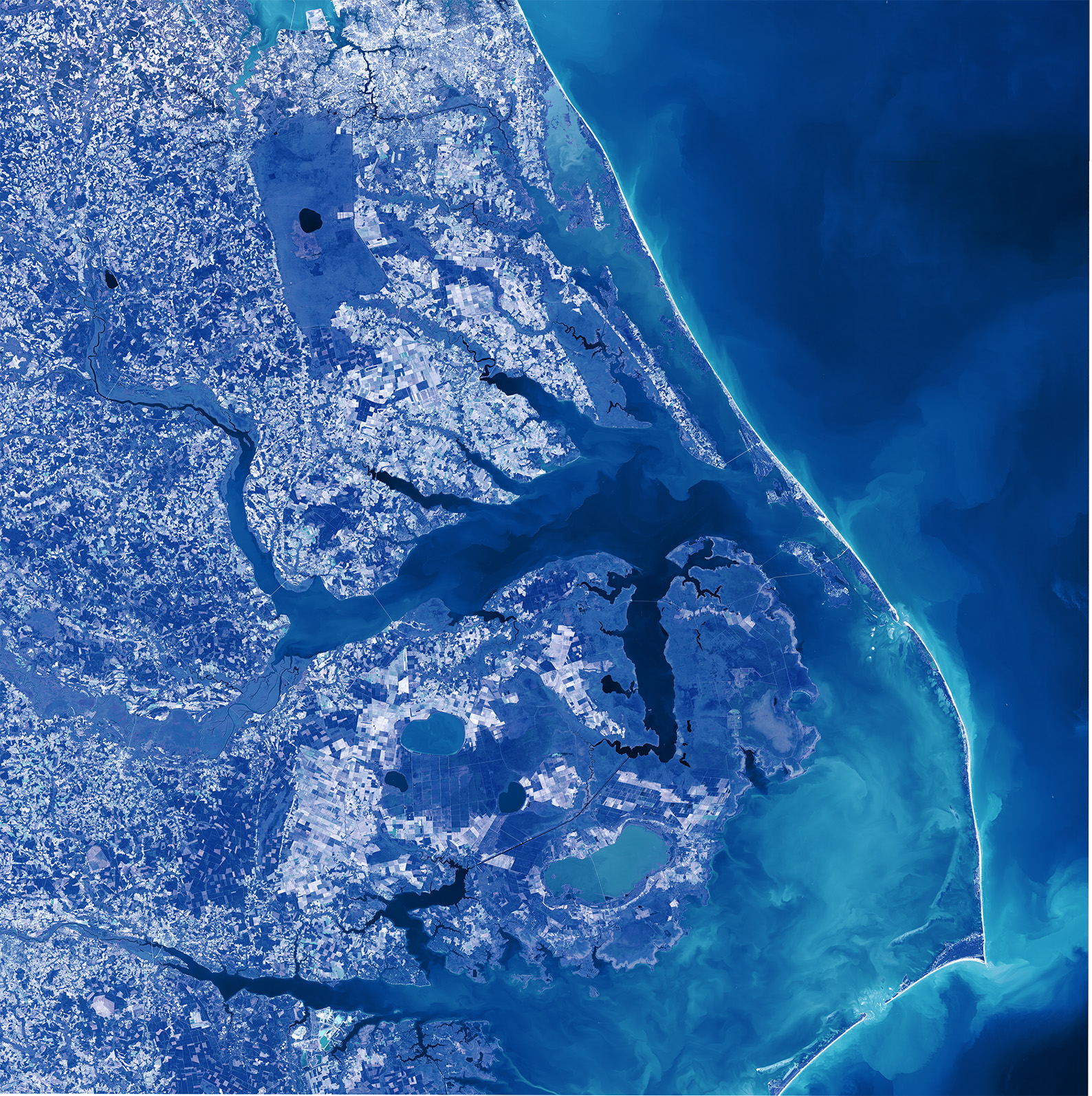
- Interactive map of Albemarle Sound
- Location: North Carolina, U.S.

Albemarle Sound (/ˈælbəˌmɑːrl/) is a large estuary on the coast of North Carolina in the United States located at the confluence of a group of rivers, including the Chowan and Roanoke. It is separated from the Atlantic Ocean by the Currituck Banks, a barrier peninsula upon which the town of Kitty Hawk is located, at the eastern edge of the sound, and part of the greater Outer Banks region. Roanoke Island is situated at the southeastern corner of the sound, where it connects to Pamlico Sound. Much of the water in the Albemarle Sound is brackish or fresh, as opposed to the saltwater of the ocean, as a result of river water pouring into the sound.

Some small portions of the Albemarle have been given their own "sound" names to distinguish these bodies of water from other parts of the large estuary. The Croatan Sound, for instance, lies between mainland Dare County and Roanoke Island. The water bordering the eastern shore of the island to the Outer Banks is commonly referred to as Roanoke Sound (this is also a historical name for the entire body of water now known as Albemarle Sound). The long stretch of water from near the Virginia state line south to around the Currituck County southern boundary is known as the Currituck Sound.

Albemarle Sound forms part of the Atlantic Intracoastal Waterway. Early English colonists, mostly migrants from Virginia, settled along it in the first permanent European settlements in what became North Carolina; these were known as the English Albemarle Settlements. Many inland Tidewater communities along the Albemarle today are classified as part of the Inner Banks region of the state.

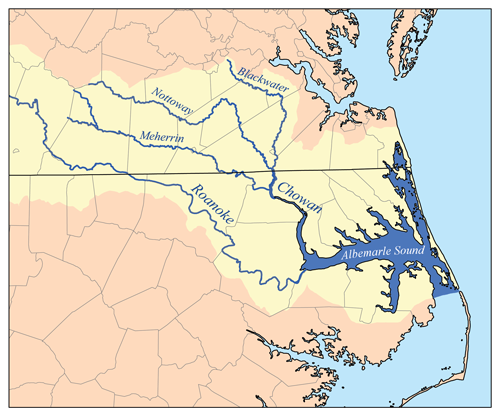
Map of Albemarle Sound showing the majority of its watershed (in yellow) excepting the Dan River and western Roanoke River drainages

== History ==
The indigenous Pamlico and their ancestors lived in the region for thousands of years. During the Late Woodland period this tribe travelled the sound in dugout canoes to trap and catch fish. The Pamlico often set up seasonal fishing camps for this purpose, retreating inland in winter weather.

In 1586, the first European explorers sailed up the fifty-five-mile (89 km) length of the Albemarle Sound. Half a century later, the first European settlers came south from Virginia, establishing agricultural and trading colonies along the shores of the sound. The Albemarle Sound soon became an important thoroughfare: small trading ships called coasters carried cargo to and from other colonies, and larger merchant ships brought spices, silks, and sugars from the West Indies in exchange for products such as tobacco (a major export of the southern colonies), herring, and lumber.

In 1663, King Charles II of England designated Albemarle Sound as part of the Province of Carolina; it was assigned to eight Lords Proprietors. One of these royal beneficiaries was George Monck, 1st Duke of Albemarle, for whom the sound is named.

Ferries were a common method of transportation through the swamps surrounding the Albemarle Sound throughout the history of the region. One ferry that linked the towns of Edenton and Mackeys, North Carolina, continued in service from 1734 to 1938, when a bridge was built across the sound. Another, longer bridge of more than 3 miles (4.8 km) in length was built in 1990.

Fishing was a major industry in the Albemarle Sound from the colonial period. In late spring, when the fish runs begans, planters set enslaved workers to fish for shad, striped bass, and herring. Fishermen sometimes had enormous nets, with some more than a mile (1600 m) long, and they were frequently staffed 24 hours a day. Herring was cut and salted for export to Europe, while shad was packed in ice and shipped up the Chowan River to be sold in northern colonies.

More recently, during the twentieth century, regional striped bass tournaments attracted sports fishermen to the area. But water pollution from industry, agriculture and other development in recent years has depleted the fisheries of the Albemarle Sound by seventy percent.

== Ecology ==
Algal blooms are extreme changes in the concentration of algae in a body of water which can be due to numerous factors including excess nutrients, sunlight, and increased temperatures. In the Albemarle Sound, the concentration of algal blooms has increased due to urban and agricultural expansion, warming temperatures, and an increase in precipitation. Excess nutrients such as phosphorus are a main cause of algal growth in these ecosystems. Total phosphorus proportionally increased with agricultural and land use on all 21 sites studied within the Albemarle Sound. Higher water temperatures often leads to algal growth, which can affect the Albemarle Sound's ecosystem and the other species living in the estuary.

Cyanobacteria are extremely small and photosynthetic bacteria that multiply to form algal blooms that can reduce water quality and potentially create toxins. Cyanobacteria have crucial roles in the Albemarle Sound's ecosystem due to its effect on water quality specifically in aquatic systems similar to the Albemarle Sound. Forty-six genera have been found with seventeen of them having the potential to be cyanotoxin species. Factors that researchers determined affect the composition of cyanobacteria are salinity and temperature. Cyanobacteria found in the Albemarle Sound such as Synechocystis, Planktothrix, and Plectonema may influence water quality and introduce cyanotoxins into the estuary's food web.

The Albemarle Sound is home to many species of wildlife including birds, amphibians, reptiles, fish, and mammals. One example of this wildlife is the American shad, a fish that migrates from the ocean into the Albemarle Sound and then into surrounding rivers to reproduce. Most American shad migrate to the Chowan River, making it a crucial area for the shad's reproduction. These spawning migrations contribute to moving energy and nutrients throughout these ecosystems by connecting the Albemarle Sound with surrounding rivers.

The salinity of the Albemarle Sound is dependent primarily on winds that force water in and out of the estuary, which can cause salinity to rise rapidly. This increase in salinity can alter the chemical environment of the water and the movement of materials such as nutrients between the ocean and the Albemarle Sound.

== See also ==
- Museum of the Albemarle
- CSS Albemarle
- USS Albemarle (AV-5)
