= Virginia Wildlife Management Areas =

Protected areas in Virginia, US

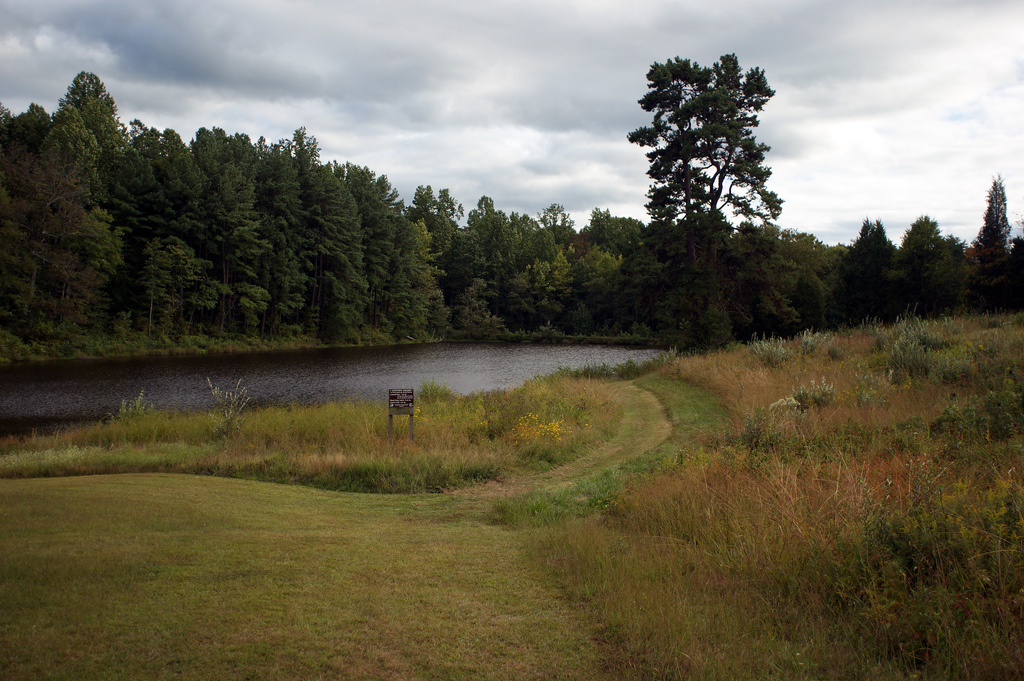
Phelps Pond, within the Chester F. Phelps Wildlife Management Area in Fauquier and Culpeper counties, Virginia

Virginia wildlife management areas (WMAs) are state-managed protected areas that exist primarily for the benefit of wildlife. Within the Commonwealth of Virginia, 46 tracts of land have been protected as WMAs, covering a total of over 216,000 acres (338 sq mi; 870 km^{2}). They are managed and maintained by the Virginia Department of Wildlife Resources.

== Purpose ==
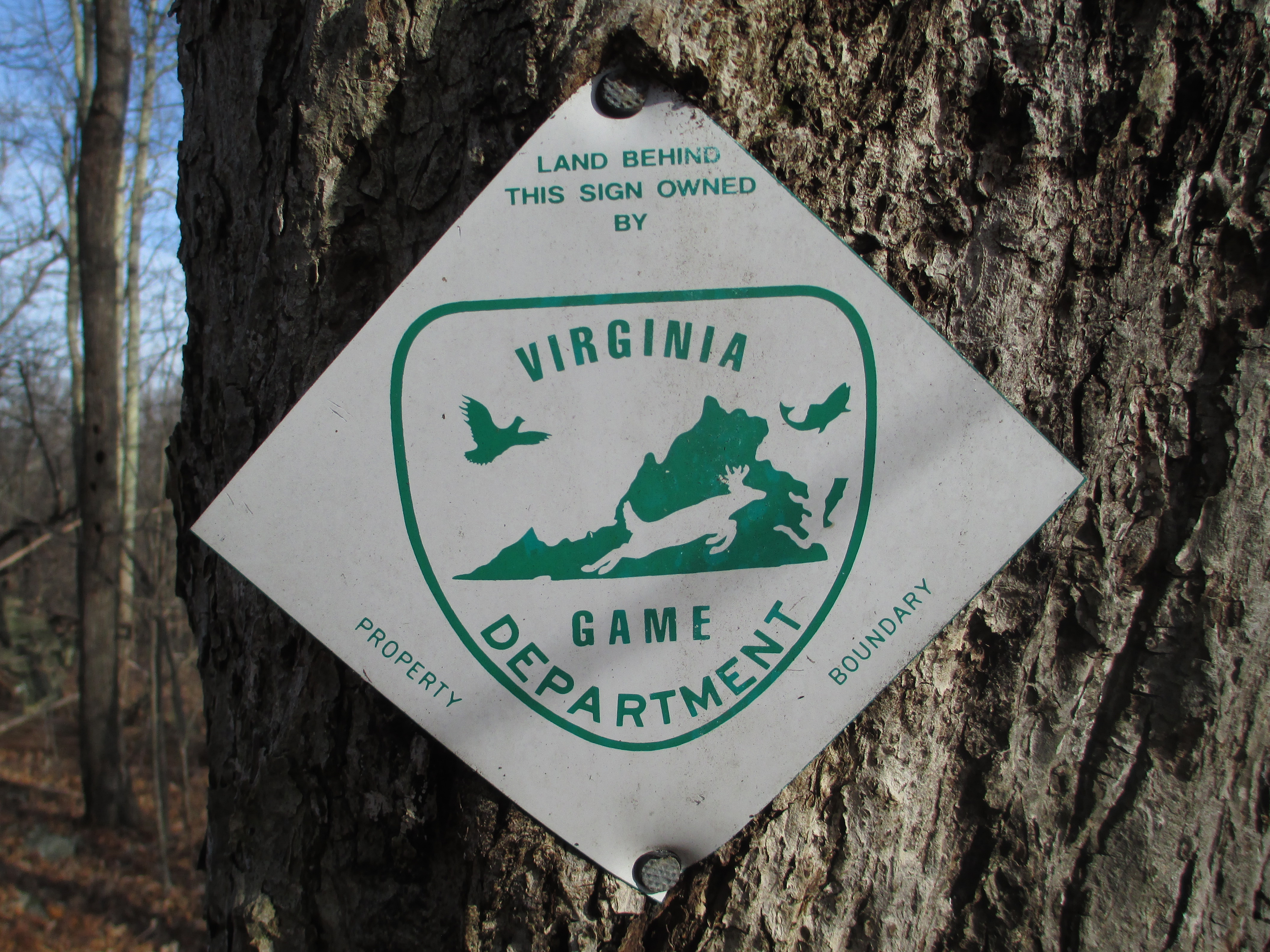
Virginia wildlife management area boundary sign

WMAs in Virginia differ from other state-managed protected areas in that they are solely intended to preserve and improve wildlife habitat, with a particular focus on game animals, and to provide public space for hunting and fishing activities. Other protected areas in the state, such as state parks, state forests, and natural area preserves, may protect habitat but are also expressly managed to provide space for public recreation, research, timber production, and/or rare species conservation.

Land acquisition and maintenance funds for WMAs are ultimately provided by hunters and anglers, through license fees and taxes levied on gear. These fees are collected on a national level through the Pittman–Robertson Federal Aid in Wildlife Restoration Act, and distributed proportionally to individual states. Some WMA lands were originally donated to the state for wildlife purposes, rather than purchased.

=== Public use and access ===
Although maintained for the primary benefit of hunters and anglers, other recreational pursuits are permitted within Virginia's WMAs. Hiking, primitive camping, horseback riding, and bird-watching is allowed on many WMA properties. Prohibited activities include swimming, mountain biking, organized sports, and ATV use. Boats, when permitted, must typically be non-motorized.

To utilize WMA land for any purpose, visitors ages 17 or older must possess a valid hunting or fishing permit, or a current Virginia boat registration. In the absence of these documents, visitors must obtain a daily or annual WMA access permit that allows entry to WMA lands.

== List of Virginia wildlife management areas ==
The following table lists Virginia's 46 WMAs as of 2023.

WMA name	City, county or counties	Area	Major waterbodies	Notes
Amelia	Amelia	2,217 acres (8.97 km^{2})	Appomattox River	
Big Survey	Wythe	7,564 acres (30.61 km^{2})		
Big Woods	Sussex	2,208 acres (8.94 km^{2})		Contiguous with Big Woods State Forest.
Briery Creek	Prince Edward	3,164 acres (12.80 km^{2})	Briery Creek Lake	
Chester F. Phelps	Fauquier, Culpeper	4,540 acres (18.4 km^{2})	Rappahannock River	
Cavalier	Chesapeake	4,485 acres (18.15 km^{2})		Comprises two separate tracts, one of which is contiguous with Great Dismal Swamp National Wildlife Refuge.
Chickahominy	Charles City	5,218 acres (21.12 km^{2})	Chickahominy River	
Clinch Mountain	Smyth, Washington, Russell, Tazewell	25,477 acres (103.10 km^{2})	Laurel Bed Lake	
Crooked Creek	Carroll	1,882 acres (7.62 km^{2})		
Dick Cross	Mecklenburg	1,400 acres (5.7 km^{2})	Roanoke River	Formerly known as the Elm Hill Wildlife Management Area.
Doe Creek	Accomack	637 acres (2.58 km^{2})		
Fairystone Farms	Patrick, Henry	5,414 acres (21.91 km^{2})	Philpott Reservoir	Contiguous with Fairy Stone State Park.
Featherfin	Prince Edward, Appomattox, Buckingham	3,084 acres (12.48 km^{2})	Appomattox River	
Flippo-Gentry	Sussex	2,000 acres (8.1 km^{2})		Located west of Big Woods WMA
G. Richard Thompson	Fauquier	3,963 acres (16.04 km^{2})	Lake Thompson	
Game Farm Marsh	New Kent	530 acres (2.1 km^{2})	Chickahominy Lake	
Goshen and Little North Mountain	Augusta, Rockbridge	33,319 acres (134.84 km^{2})	Maury River	Contiguous with George Washington National Forest and Goshen Pass Natural Area Preserve.
Hardware River	Fluvanna	1,175 acres (4.76 km^{2})	James River, Hardware River	
Havens	Roanoke	9,023 acres (36.51 km^{2})		The first VDGIF-managed property, initially purchased in 1930.
Hidden Valley	Washington	6,400 acres (26 km^{2})	Hidden Valley Lake	
Highland	Highland	14,283 acres (57.80 km^{2})	Bullpasture River	
Hog Island	Surry, Isle of Wight	3,908 acres (15.82 km^{2})	James River	
Horsepen Lake	Buckingham	2,910 acres (11.8 km^{2})	Horsepen Lake	
James River	Nelson	1,213 acres (4.91 km^{2})	James River	
Land's End	King George	450 acres (1.8 km^{2})	Rappahannock River	Managed as a waterfowl refuge; hunting not permitted.
Mattaponi	Caroline	2,542 acres (10.29 km^{2})	Mattaponi River, South River	
Mattaponi Bluffs	Caroline	470 acres (1.9 km^{2})	Mattaponi River	
Merrimac Farm	Prince William	301 acres (1.22 km^{2})		Adjacent to Marine Corps Base Quantico.
Mockhorn Island	Northampton	7,642 acres (30.93 km^{2})		Extent of the WMA's tidal marshland is greatly reduced at high tide.
Oakley Forest	Spotsylvania	4,459 acres (18.04 km^{2})		
Pettigrew	Caroline	934 acres (3.78 km^{2})		
Powhatan	Powhatan	4,463 acres (18.06 km^{2})		
Princess Anne	Virginia Beach	1,546 acres (6.26 km^{2})	Atlantic Ocean (Back Bay)	
Ragged Island	Isle of Wight	1,537 acres (6.22 km^{2})	James River	
Rapidan	Madison; Greene	10,870 acres (44.0 km^{2})	Rapidan River, Conway River, South River	Contiguous with Shenandoah National Park.
Robert W. Duncan	Caroline	1,300 acres (5.3 km^{2})	Mattaponi River	
Saxis	Accomack	5,574 acres (22.56 km^{2})	Atlantic Ocean	Primarily protects tidal marshland on Virginia's eastern shore.
Short Hills	Rockbridge, Botetourt	4,232 acres (17.13 km^{2})		Includes examples of karst topography.
Smith Mountain Cooperative	Bedford, Pittsylvania	4,996 acres (20.22 km^{2})	Smith Mountain Lake	Owned by Appalachian Power and managed by VDWR.
Stewarts Creek	Carroll	1,138 acres (4.61 km^{2})		
Turkeycock	Franklin, Henry	2,678 acres (10.84 km^{2})		
T. M. Gathright	Bath	13,428 acres (54.34 km^{2})	Lake Moomaw	
Tye River	Nelson	1,044 acres (4.22 km^{2})	Tye River	Received from Dominion Energy via The Conservation Fund as mitigation for allowing the proposed Atlantic Coast Pipeline to cross the James River WMA
Ware Creek	New Kent	2,600 acres (11 km^{2})	York River	
Weston	Fauquier	271 acres (1.10 km^{2})		
White Oak Mountain	Pittsylvania	2,748 acres (11.12 km^{2})	Banister River	

== See also ==
- List of National Wildlife Refuges in Virginia
