= Piney Grove Flatwoods Natural Area Preserve =

Natural preserve in Virginia, United States

- IUCN category III (natural monument or feature)
- Location within Virginia
- Location: Sussex County, Virginia
- Nearest city: Petersburg
- Coordinates: 36°48′34″N 76°51′32″W
- Area: 446 acres (180 ha)
- Established: 2021
- Governing body: The Nature Conservancy

The Piney Grove Flatwoods Natural Area Preserve is a 446-acre (1.80 km^{2}) Natural Area Preserve located west of the town of Wakefield, Virginia in Sussex County. Governor Ralph Northam dedicated the land as the 66th natural area preserve on 23 November 2021. The preserve is part of a larger 10,000-acre (40 km^{2}) protected area that includes Big Woods State Forest, Big Woods Wildlife Management Area and Piney Grove Preserve.

The preserve provides habitat for the endangered Red-cockaded Woodpecker, along with rare species of amphibians, plants and fish. The preserve is part of an effort to turn the land back into the pre-Colonial forest landscape of southeastern Virginia through the use of prescribed burns, selective cutting, and reintroduction of longleaf pine, a patchwork of open pine savannas, isolated wetlands and swampy bottomlands is taking shape and supporting a suite of species on the brink of disappearing from the region.

The preserve is owned and maintained by The Nature Conservancy, and is open to public visitation only through prior arrangement.

== See also ==
- Virginia Natural Area Preserve System
- Big Woods State Forest
- Big Woods Wildlife Management Area
- List of Virginia Natural Area Preserves
