= Merrimac Farm Wildlife Management Area =

Wildlife management area in Virginia, United States

- IUCN category IV (habitat/species management area)
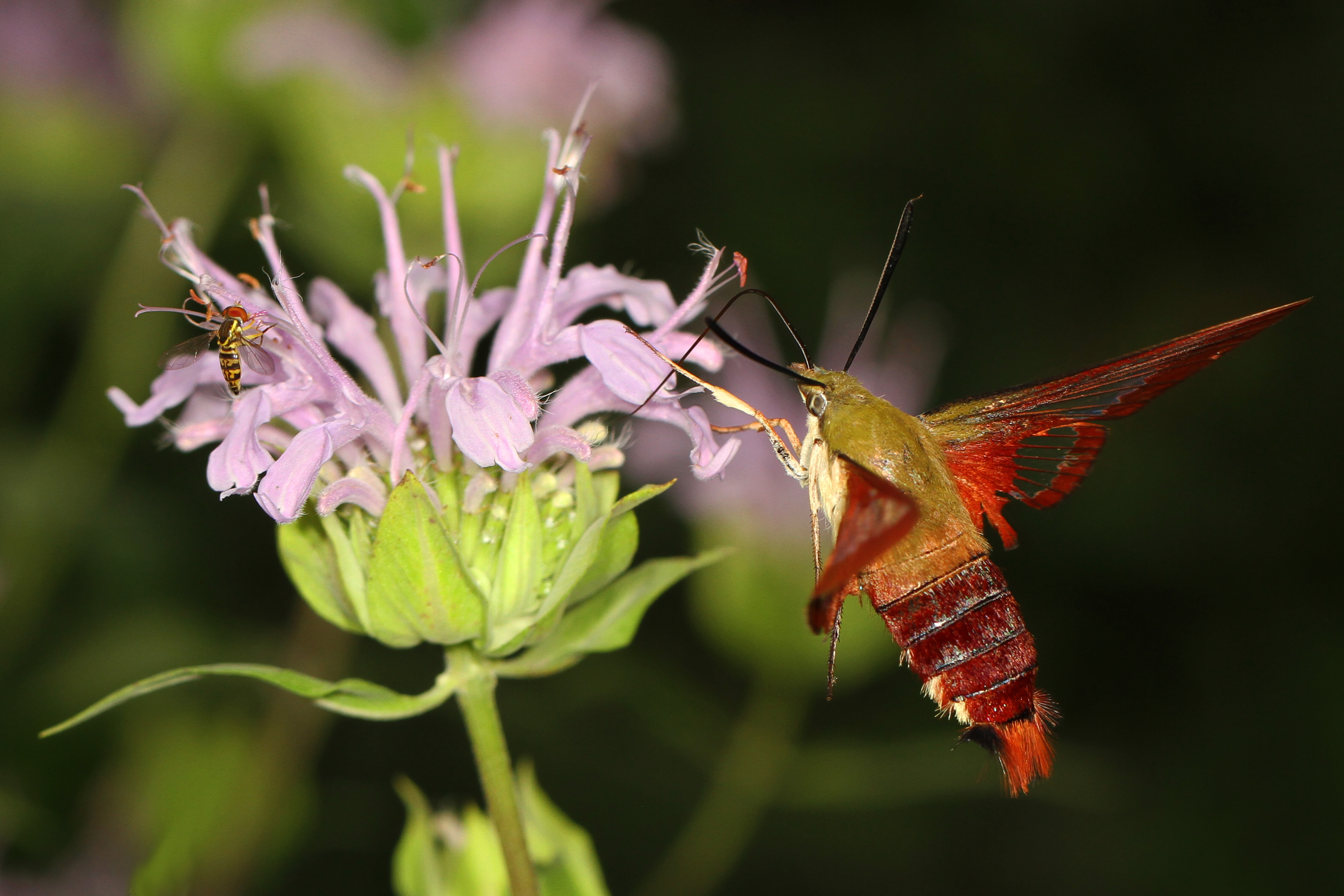
- Flower fly (L) and hummingbird clearwing (R), feeding on beebalm in Merrimac Farm Wildlife Management Area

- Location within Virginia Location within the United States
- Nearest city: Nokesville, Virginia U.S.
- Coordinates: 38°37′30″N 77°32′24″W
- Area: 302 acres (122 ha)
- Established: April 10, 2008
- Governing body: Virginia Department of Wildlife Resources

Merrimac Farm Wildlife Management Area, composed of wetlands, fields, and hardwood forest, became Virginia's 37th wildlife management area when the site was dedicated on April 10, 2008. It was created with funding from the Virginia Land Conservation Foundation, the Department of the Navy and the Department of Game and Inland Fisheries. Home to a variety of flora and wildlife, the area has one of the largest fields of Virginia bluebell flowers in northern Virginia.

== History ==
Located in Prince William County, Virginia, the site is a 302-acre (122 ha) protected area near Nokesville, approximately 35 mi (56 km) southwest of Washington, D.C. It is one of 39 Wildlife Management Areas owned by the Virginia Dept. of Game & Inland Fisheries, and is part of the Cedar Run floodplain. To create the area, land was acquired next to Marine Corps Base Quantico. The Virginia Land Conservation Foundation granted $820,773 in 2008 towards the area's conservation efforts. An additional $1,429,750 in funding was provided through the Department of the Navy's Federal Military Encroachment Partnering Program. Department of Game and Inland Fisheries donated $608,997 from receipts of hunting licenses.

The area is administered through a partnership with the Virginia Department of Game and Inland Fisheries, the Prince William Conservation Alliance, Marine Corps Base Quantico, and the McDowell family, who originally owned the property.

== Flora and fauna ==
The management area is noted for having one of the state's largest fields of Virginia bluebell flowers, located on the banks of the Cedar Run, Occoquan River tributary at Nokesville. Each year, they pay homage to the native flower with their free-of-charge Virginia Bluebell Festival. The 2022 festival is scheduled for April 10. Both the bluebell field, and oak-hickory forest, a relatively uncommon upland depressional forest with many unique species of plants, are listed on the Virginia Native Plant Society’s site registry.

The nature habitat is also home to many varieties of wildlife, such as amphibians, arachnids, and bird life; including the white-eyed vireo, American woodcock, osprey, feather-legged fly, northern harrier, Cooper’s hawk, red-shouldered hawk, broad-winged hawk, American kestrel and the American bald eagle. Among the hundreds of insects found in the region are the six-spotted tiger beetle and feather-legged fly.

== Gallery ==
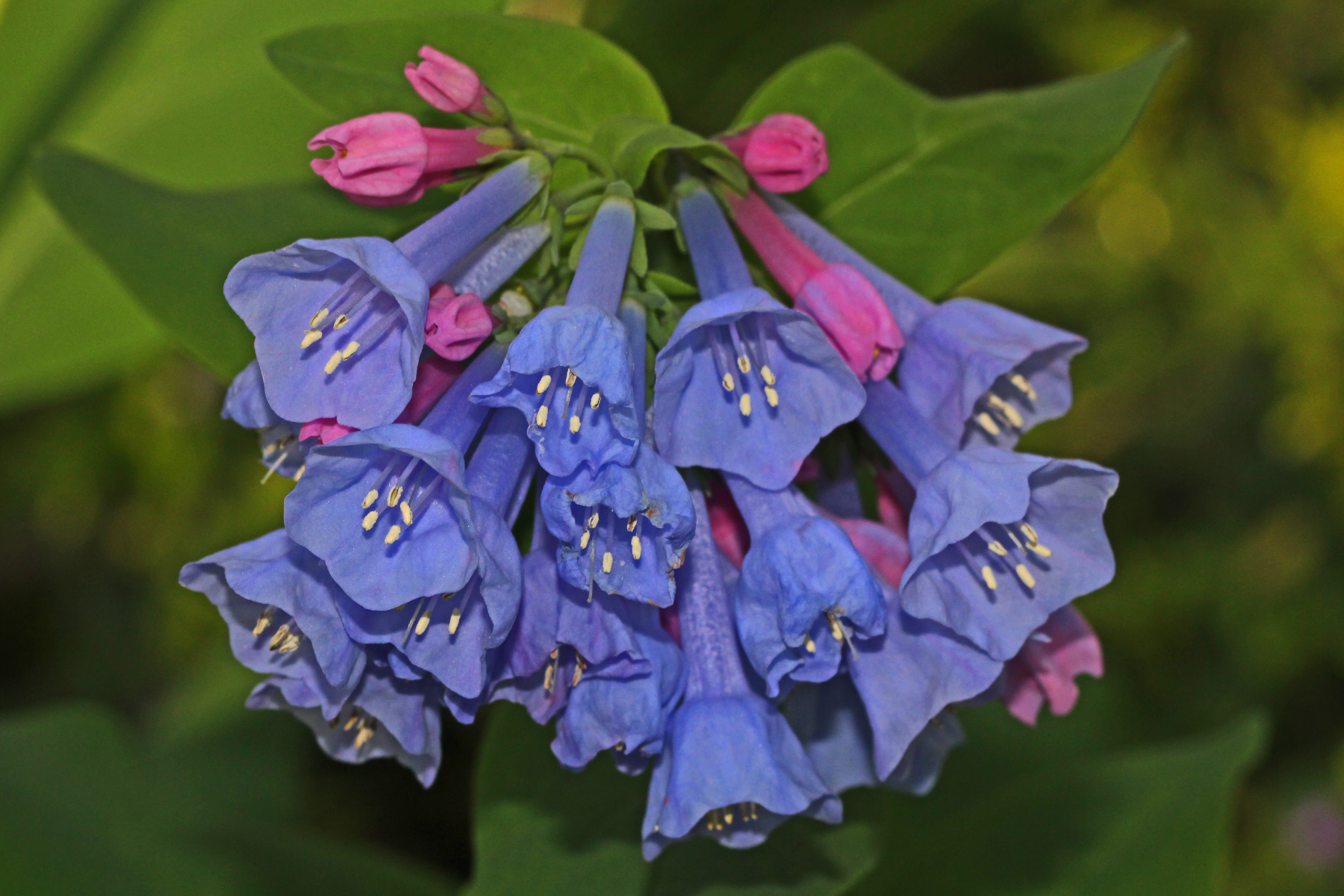
Virginia bluebell

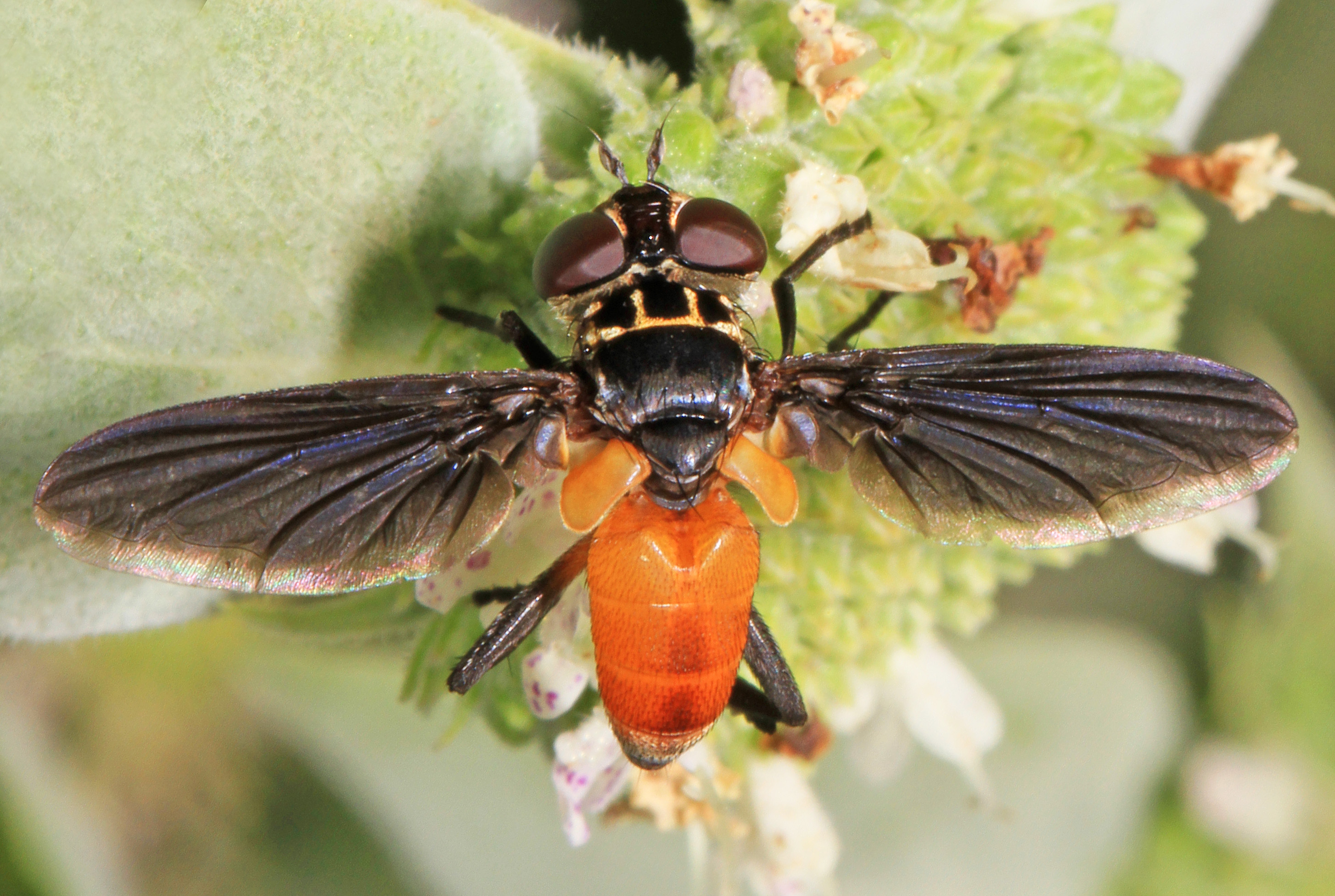
Feather-legged fly

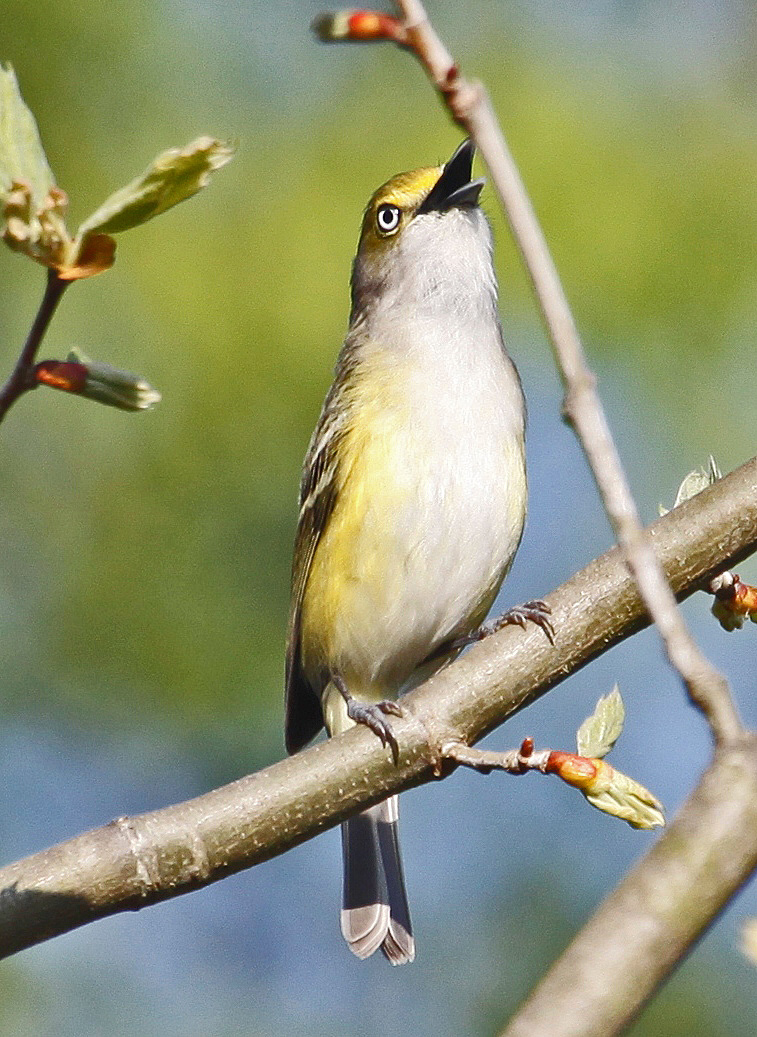
White-eyed vireo

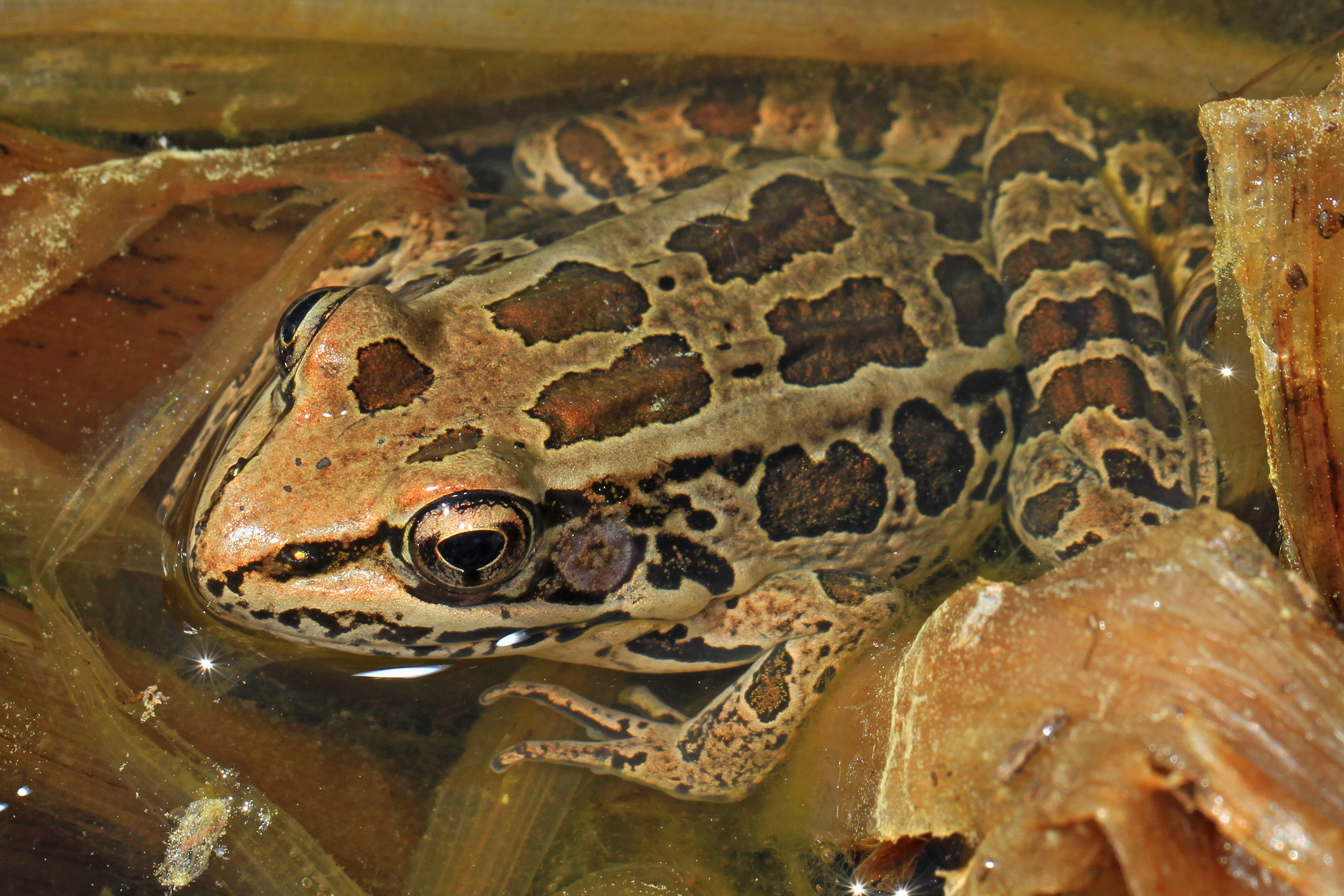
Pickerel frog

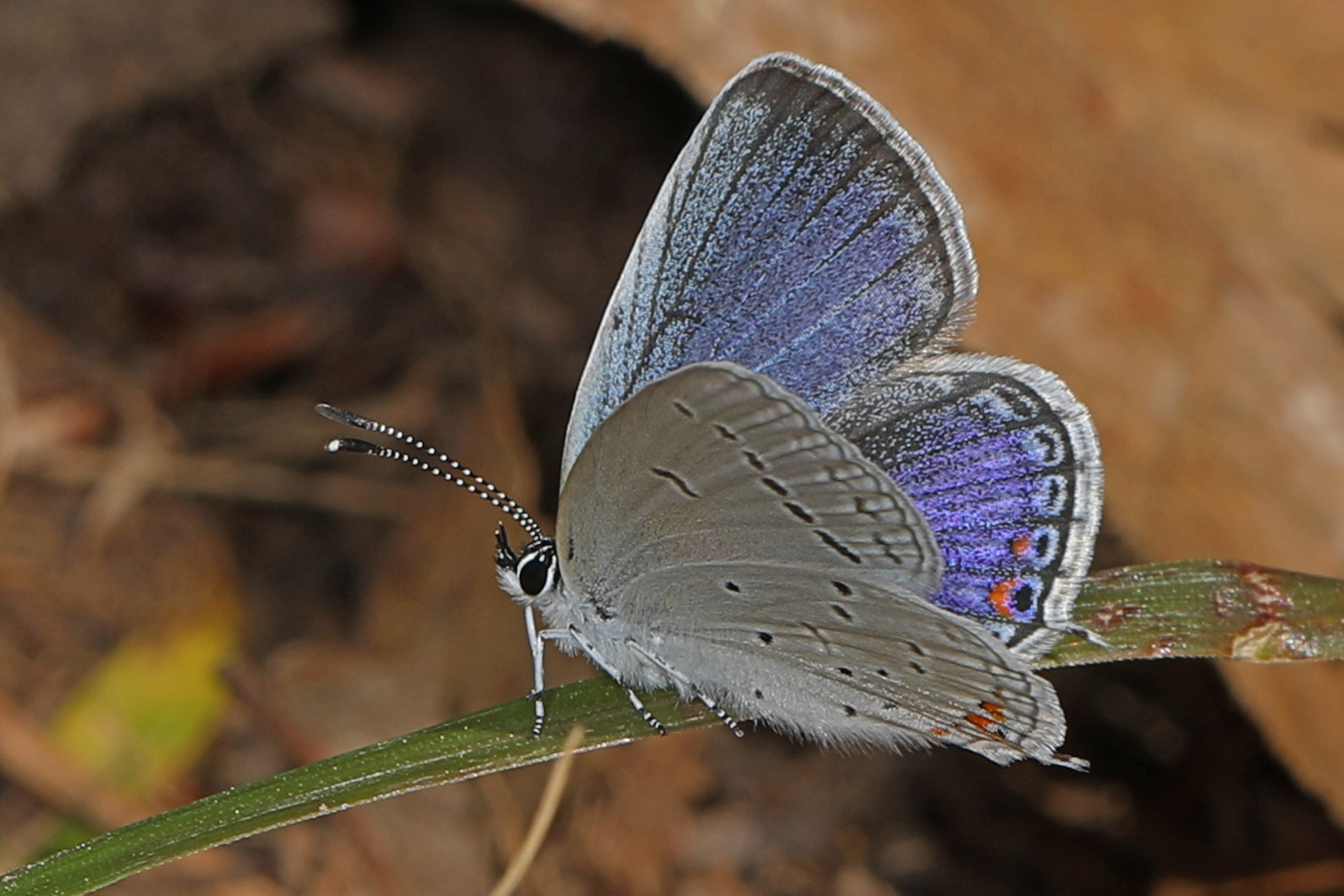
Eastern tailed-blue - Cupido comynta

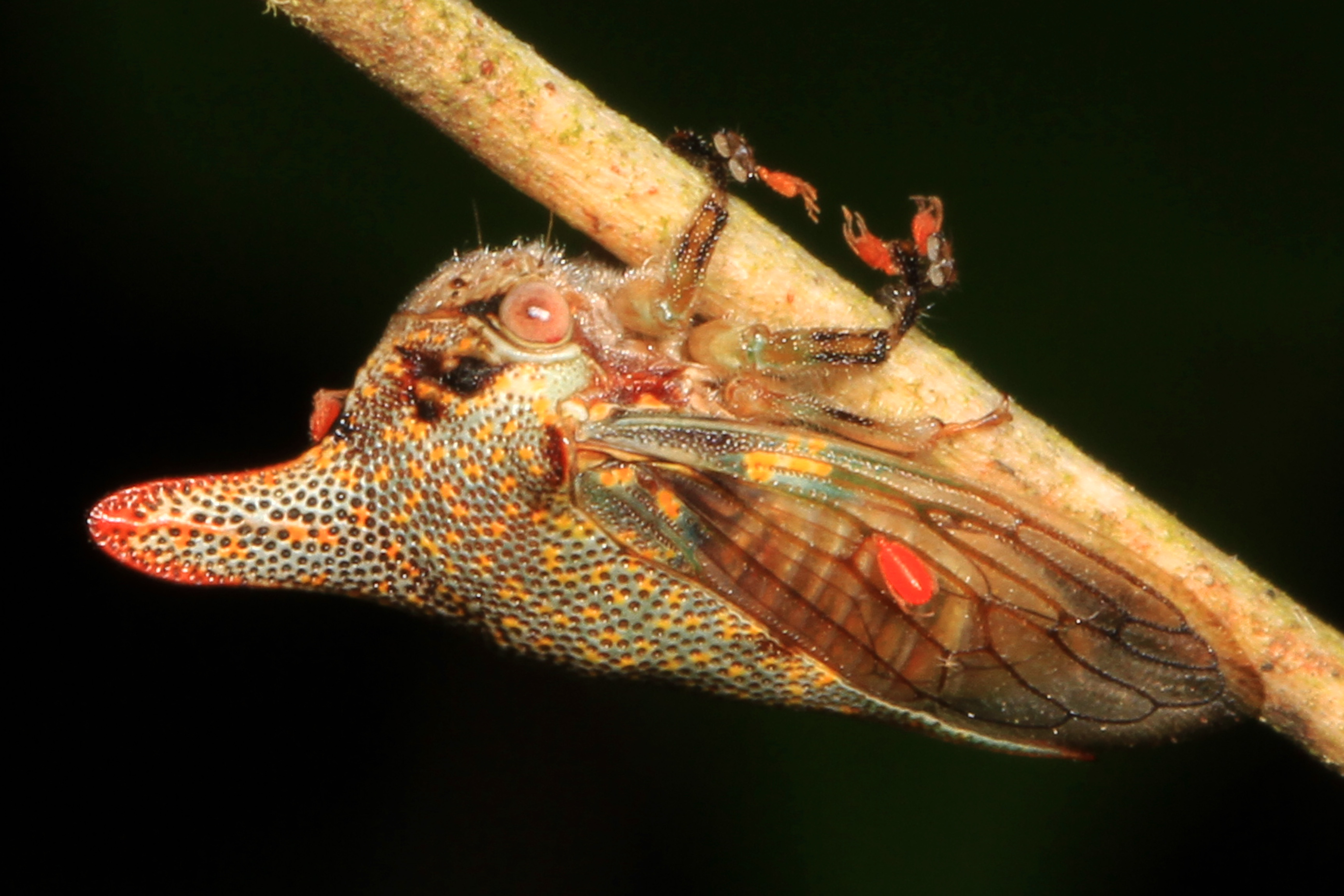
Oak treehopper

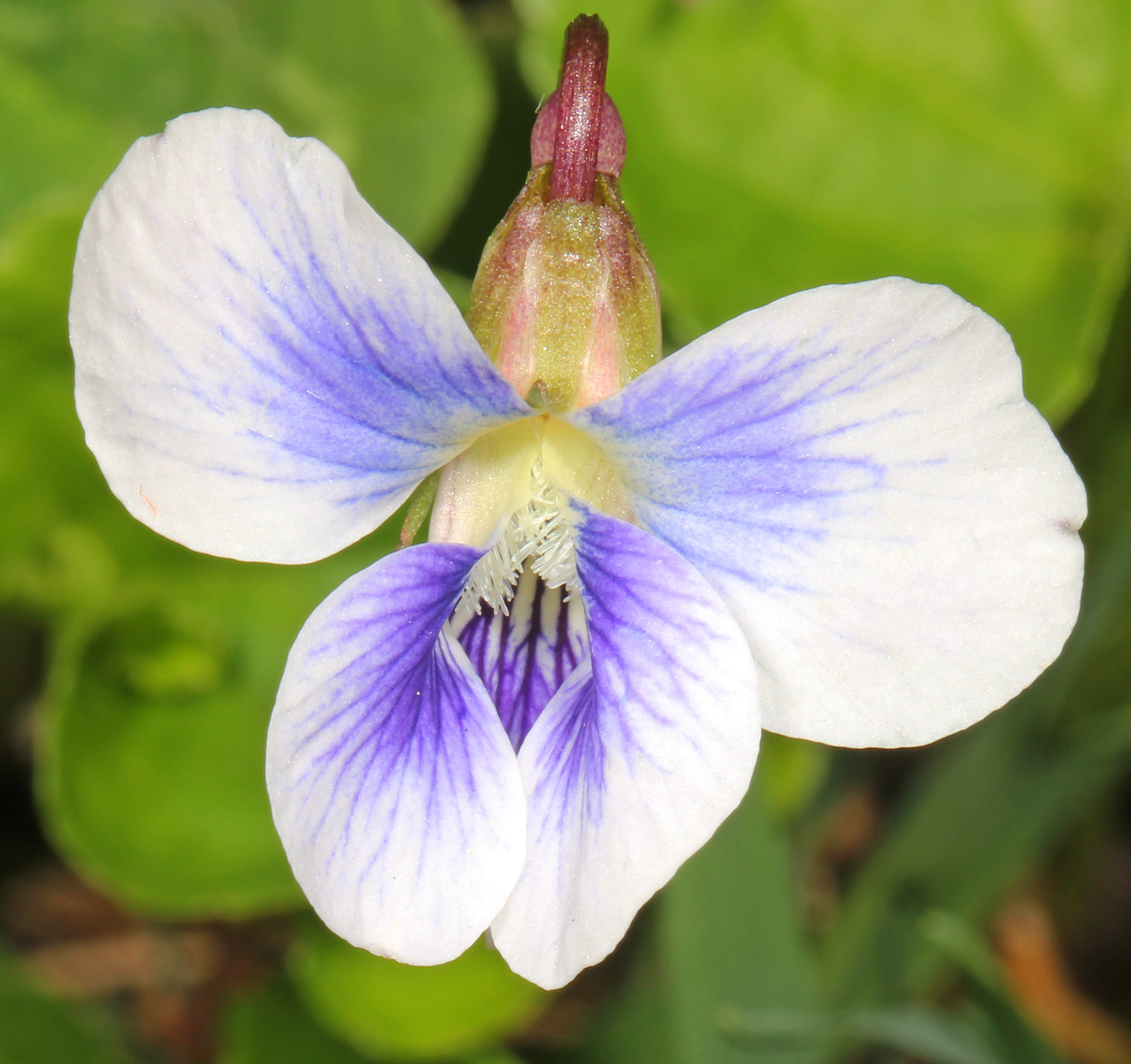
Confederate violet

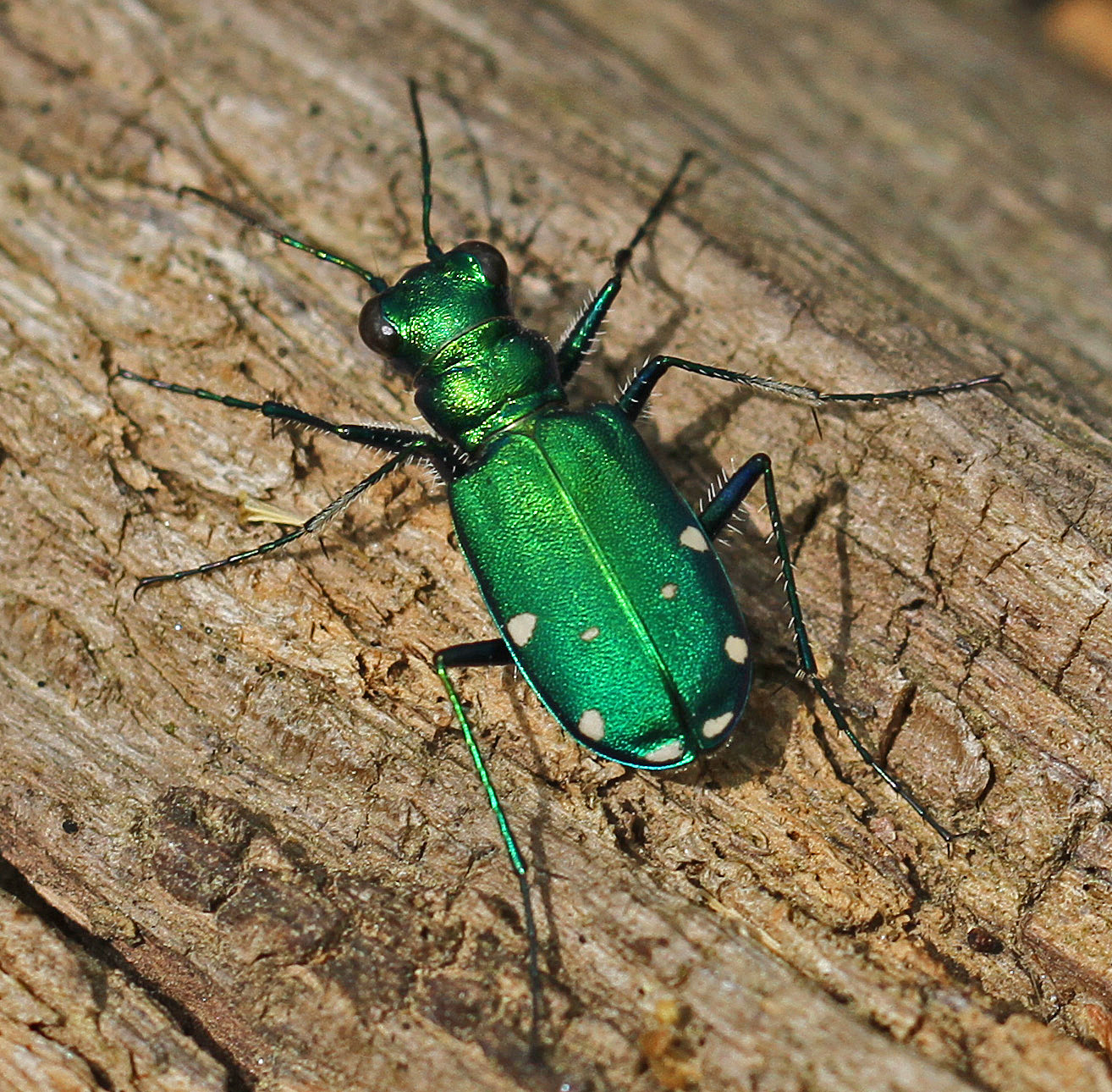
Six-spotted tiger beetle

== See also ==
- White Oak Mountain Wildlife Management Area
- Fairystone Farms Wildlife Management Area
