= Hardware River Wildlife Management Area =

Protected area of Virginia, United States

- IUCN category V (protected landscape/seascape)
- Location within Virginia Location within the United States
- Location: Fluvanna County, Virginia
- Nearest city: Scottsville
- Coordinates: 37°45′N 78°25′W
- Area: 1,034 acres (4.18 km^{2})
- Governing body: Virginia Department of Game and Inland Fisheries

Hardware River Wildlife Management Area is a 1,034-acre (4.18 km^{2}) Wildlife Management Area (WMA) in Fluvanna County, Virginia. Its namesake is the Hardware River which provides a portion of its boundary and runs through its interior; however, it is known for the access it provides to the James River. The area's former farmland today hosts forests of oak, maple, and hickory, with stands of pure pine on the highest ground. Elevations range between 250 feet (76 m) along the James River's floodplain and 450 feet (140 m) at the areas highest points.

Hardware River Wildlife Management Area is owned and maintained by the Virginia Department of Game and Inland Fisheries. The area is open to the public for hunting, trapping, fishing, hiking, horseback riding, boating, and primitive camping. Access for persons 17 years of age or older requires a valid hunting or fishing permit, a current Virginia boat registration, or a WMA access permit.

== See also ==
- List of Virginia Wildlife Management Areas
