= Rapidan Wildlife Management Area =

Protected area of Virginia, United States

- IUCN category V (protected landscape/seascape)
- Location within Virginia Location within the United States
- Location: Madison and Greene counties, Virginia
- Coordinates: 38°22′19″N 78°28′52″W
- Area: 10,326 acres (41.79 km^{2})
- Governing body: Virginia Department of Game and Inland Fisheries

Rapidan Wildlife Management Area is a 10,326-acre (41.79 km^{2}) Wildlife Management Area (WMA) in Madison and Greene counties, Virginia. It is composed of eight separate tracts of land along the eastern slope of the Blue Ridge Mountains; four of these adjoin Shenandoah National Park, and combined they share 25 miles (40 km) of boundary.

Elevations within the area range from 1,400 to 3,840 feet (430 to 1,170 m) above sea level. Much of the area was forested prior to being acquired by the state, although timber harvesting took place frequently. Most of the woods are hardwood, dominated by chestnut oak and tulip poplar; populations of sugar maple and yellow and black birch may be found in some of the higher and deeper areas. Some of the older timber nearly died from gypsy moth infestation before being salvaged in the late 1980s. Evidence of former human habitation, including old home sites, cemeteries, and rock piles, may still be found in the area.

Three major waterways, the Rapidan, Conway, and South rivers, cross the property. These fast-moving streams and their tributaries support healthy populations of brook trout.

Rapidan WMA is owned and maintained by the Virginia Department of Game and Inland Fisheries. The area is open to the public for hunting, trapping, fishing, hiking, horseback riding, and primitive camping. Access for persons 17 years of age or older requires a valid hunting or fishing permit, or a WMA access permit.

== Hunting ==
The deer and turkey populations in the Rapidan area are moderate, but stable in numbers, providing quality hunting opportunities. Other animals that can be found in the area include grey squirrels, ruffed grouse and black bears. Woocock can also be found in some of the wetter sites and along the larger streams.

== Fishing ==
The Rapidan Wildlife Management Area maintains an excellent native trout fishery. The area is home to healthy populations of brook trout and wild brown trout, which can be found in the Rapidan and Conway Rivers. Fish-for-fun regulations apply on the Rapidan River and all its tributaries within the boundaries of the area and the Shenandoah National Park.

== See also ==
- List of Virginia Wildlife Management Areas
