= Mattapony (disambiguation) =

Mattapony is a former hundred in Worcester County, Maryland.

Mattapony and its various spellings (Mattaponi, Mataponi, Mattapany, Matapani) may also refer to:

- Mattaponi, an Algonquian tribe
- Mattaponi River, a tributary of the York River estuary in eastern Virginia
- Mattaponi, Virginia, an unincorporated community in King and Queen County, Virginia
- Mattaponi Wildlife Management Area, a state-managed protected area in Caroline County, Virginia
- USS Mattaponi (AO-41), the name of a United States Navy Mattaponi-class oiler
- Mataponi Creek, a tributary of the Patuxent River in Prince George's County, Maryland
- Camp Mataponi, an all-girls sleepaway camp in Naples, Maine
- Matapani, a settlement in Kenya's Coast Province
- Mattapany-Sewall Archeological Site, a registered historic place in St. Mary's County, Maryland
- Mattapony Creek, a tributary of the Pocomoke River in Worcester County, Maryland
- Mattaponi (John Bowie Jr. House) is a historic building in Nottingham, Prince George's County, Maryland

== See also ==
- Mattapan, Boston
