= Amelia Wildlife Management Area =

Protected area of Virginia, United States

- IUCN category V (protected landscape/seascape)
- Location within Virginia Location within the United States
- Location: Amelia County, Virginia
- Coordinates: 37°27′50″N 77°54′45″W
- Governing body: Virginia Department of Game and Inland Fisheries

Amelia Wildlife Management Area is a 2,217-acre (8.97 km^{2}) Wildlife Management Area located in Amelia County, Virginia. Primarily upland habitat, it also preserves around 175 acres (0.71 km^{2}) of bottomland hardwoods and beaver swampland along the Appomattox River. Much of the land was formerly used for farming; today it is managed to preserve wildlife habitat. The forest is mature, with gently rolling terrain, and an altitude between 200 and 300 feet (61 and 91 m) above sea level. Much of the area is bounded on the north by the Appomattox River.

Amelia Wildlife Management Area is owned and maintained by the Virginia Department of Game and Inland Fisheries. The area is open to the public for hunting, fishing, hiking, horseback riding, boating, and camping. Access for persons 17 years of age or older requires a valid hunting or fishing permit, a current Virginia boat registration, or a WMA access permit.

== See also ==
- List of Virginia Wildlife Management Areas
