= Dick Cross Wildlife Management Area =

Protected area in Virginia, U.S.

- IUCN category V (protected landscape/seascape)
- Location within Virginia Location within the United States
- Location: Mecklenburg County, Virginia
- Coordinates: 36°36′57″N 78°17′20″W
- Area: 1,400 acres (5.7 km^{2})
- Governing body: Virginia Department of Game and Inland Fisheries

Dick Cross Wildlife Management Area is a 1,400-acre (5.7 km^{2}) Wildlife Management Area in Mecklenburg County, Virginia. Formerly known as the Elm Hill Wildlife Management Area, it sits on the north side of the Roanoke River just below the John H. Kerr Dam. The terrain is gently rolling and fairly low, between 200 and 300 feet (61 and 91 m) above sea level, and is typified by open fields maintained for the benefit of wildlife. Much of the land was once used to support the farming of cattle, and some evidence of this remains. Close to 300 acres (1.2 km^{2}) of broad flood plain has been preserved along the river and along Allen Creek, which forms the area's eastern boundary before joining the Roanoke River. Around 165 acres (0.67 km^{2}) of the area includes impounded wetlands specifically managed for waterfowl.

Dick Cross Wildlife Management Area is owned and maintained by the Virginia Department of Game and Inland Fisheries. The area is open to the public for hunting, trapping, fishing, hiking, horseback riding, and primitive camping. Bird dog field trials are held at the property, which includes a number of kennels for that use. An observation tower near the area's wetlands provides opportunities to observe wildlife, including bald eagles that are known to overwinter in the area. Access for persons 17 years of age or older requires a valid hunting or fishing permit, or a WMA access permit.

== See also ==
- List of Virginia Wildlife Management Areas
