= Mattaponi Wildlife Management Area =

State-managed protected area in Caroline County, Virginia

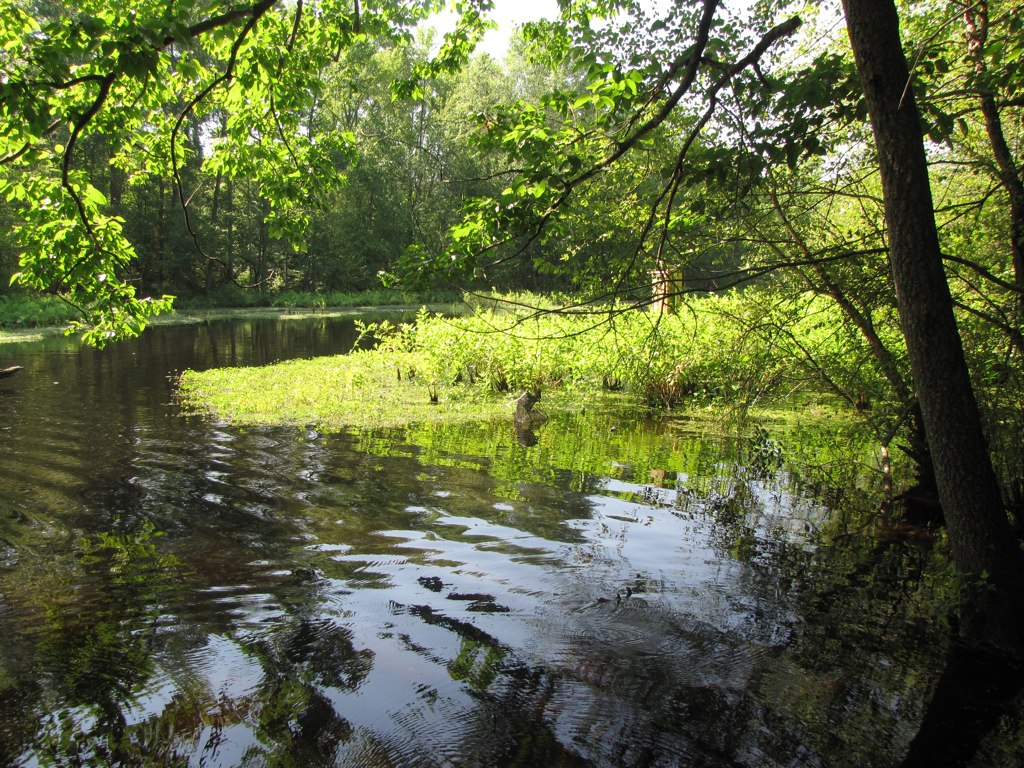
- Wetlands at Mattaponi Wildlife Management Area

- Location within Virginia Location within the United States
- Location: Caroline County, Virginia
- Nearest city: Bowling Green
- Coordinates: 38°03′48″N 77°23′40″W
- Area: 2,542 acres (10.29 km^{2})
- Established: March 30, 2011
- Governing body: Virginia Department of Game and Inland Fisheries

Mattaponi Wildlife Management Area is a 2,542-acre (10.29 km^{2}) Wildlife Management Area (WMA) in Caroline County, Virginia. Located west of Bowling Green, the area protects a mixture of wetlands and upland forests at the confluence of the Mattaponi and South rivers.

== History ==
Prior to state ownership, the land that was to become Mattaponi WMA was used for timber production and rock quarrying. After being identified as an opportunity to conserve diverse wildlife habitat in an area undergoing suburbanization, the WMA was acquired by the Virginia Department of Game and Inland Fisheries (VDGIF) in 2010. The total purchase price of $7.6 million was shared between VDGIF and several partners, including The Nature Conservancy, The Trust for Public Land, and Ducks Unlimited. A significant portion of funding – $1.4 million – was provided by the U.S. Department of Defense as part of a program to protect lands in the vicinity of Fort A.P. Hill.

Mattaponi WMA was officially opened to the public on March 30, 2011.

== Description ==
Mattaponi WMA covers 2,542 acres (10.29 km^{2}) in Virginia's upper coastal plain, 1.3 miles (2.1 km) west of Bowling Green in Caroline County. It borders five miles (8.0 km) of the upper Mattaponi River and one and a half miles (2.4 km) of the South River; the confluence of the two streams is located at the southern end of the WMA. Its boundaries contain both upland forests, various types of wetlands, and open water habitats, including two rare oxbow lakes found within bottomlands where the Mattaponi once flowed.

Management at Mattaponi WMA focuses on enhancing wildlife habitat, using techniques such as selective timber harvest, prescribed burns, and controlling water levels within wetlands and ponds. Approximately 500 acres (2.0 km^{2}) is used by Fort A.P. Hill as a wetland mitigation bank.

Wildlife found on the property include a number of game animals, such as deer, bear, turkey, and squirrels; waterfowl are also abundant within the area's wetlands. Other game bird species, such as bobwhite quail and woodcock, are also found at the property and benefit from management that periodically clears portions of the landscape of mature vegetation. Fish found within the river include bluegill, redbreast sunfish, and largemouth bass; ponds on the property contain crappie, bluegill, largemouth bass, chain pickerel, and a limited number of bowfin.

A survey conducted by the Virginia Herpetological Society indicated a healthy diversity of amphibians, turtles, lizards, and snakes, including the carpenter frog, a species more typically found in extreme southeastern Virginia, with only occasional occurrences in Caroline County.

=== Public use and access ===
Mattaponi WMA is open to the public for hunting, trapping, fishing, hiking, and primitive camping. Access for persons 17 years of age or older requires a valid hunting or fishing permit, or a WMA access permit.

== See also ==
- List of Virginia Wildlife Management Areas
