= Stewarts Creek Wildlife Management Area =

Protected area of Virginia, United States

- IUCN category V (protected landscape/seascape)
- Location within Virginia Location within the United States
- Location: Carroll County, Virginia
- Nearest city: Galax
- Coordinates: 36°36′2″N 80°48′45″W
- Area: 1,087 acres (4.40 km^{2})
- Governing body: Virginia Department of Game and Inland Fisheries

Stewarts Creek Wildlife Management Area is a 1,087-acre (4.40 km^{2}) Wildlife Management Area (WMA) in Carroll County, Virginia. It lies along the Blue Ridge Mountains, with terrain that is rugged and steep; its lowest elevation is 1,580 feet (480 m) above sea level, while the highest is at 2,955 feet (901 m), near the Blue Ridge Parkway. Five sections of streams totaling 4.8 miles (7.7 km), including the headwaters of both the North and South forks of Stewarts Creek, lie within the area's boundaries; many of these contain populations of brook trout, and are bordered by thickets of rhododendrons. Most of the area is wooded, mainly with tulip poplar, yellow birch, oak, and hickory.

Stewarts Creek WMA is owned and maintained by the Virginia Department of Game and Inland Fisheries. The area is open to the public for hunting, trapping, fishing, hiking, horseback riding, and primitive camping. Access for persons 17 years of age or older requires a valid hunting or fishing permit, or a WMA access permit.

== See also ==
- List of Virginia Wildlife Management Areas
