= G. Richard Thompson Wildlife Management Area =

Park in Fauquier County, Virginia, United States of America

- IUCN category V (protected landscape/seascape)
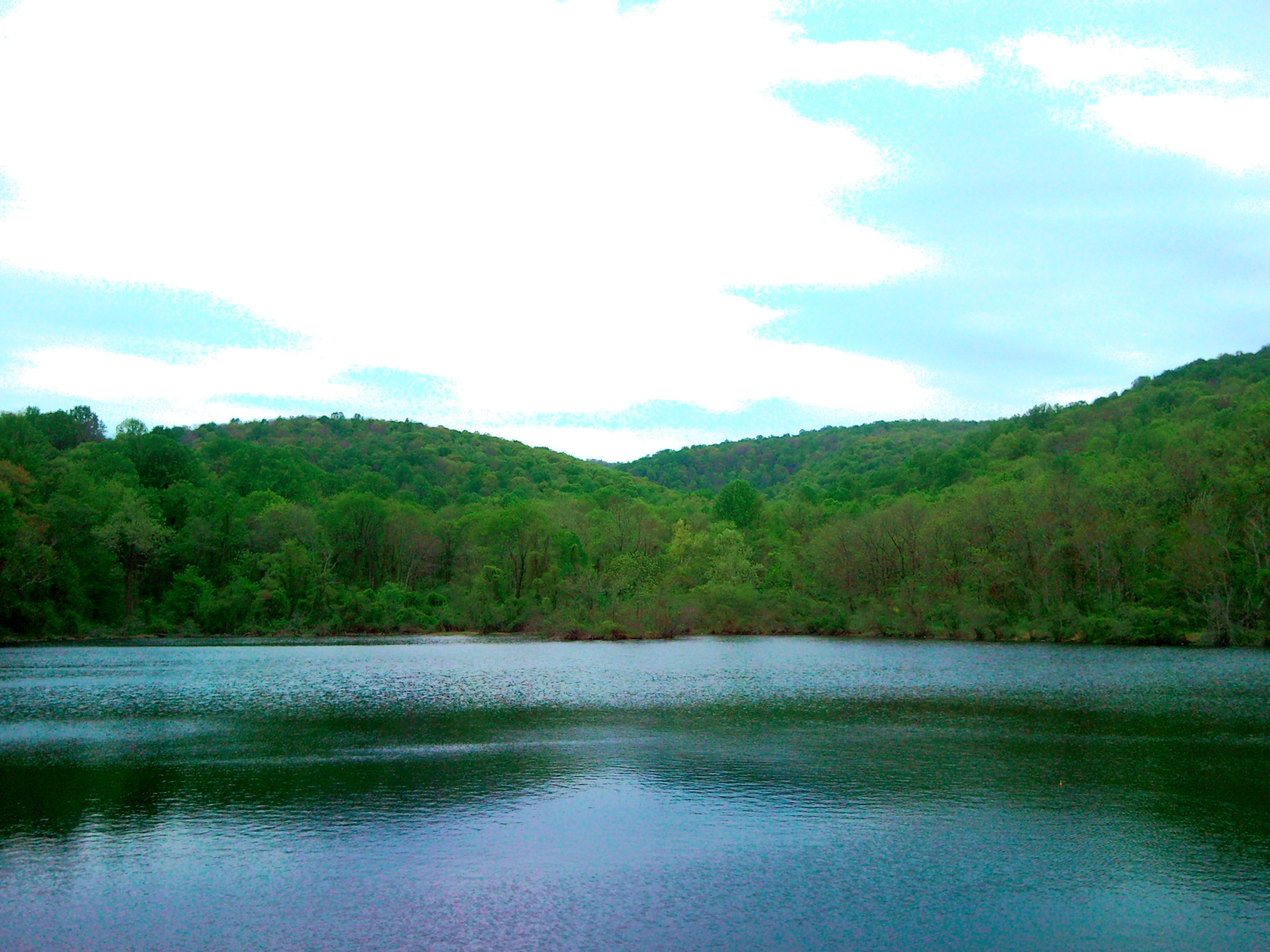
- Lake Thompson with the Blue Ridge in the background

- Location within Virginia Location within the United States
- Location: Fauquier, Warren and Clarke counties, Virginia
- Nearest city: Front Royal
- Coordinates: 38°59′5″N 77°59′31″W
- Area: 4,000 acres (16 km^{2})
- Governing body: Virginia Department of Game and Inland Fisheries

G. Richard Thompson Wildlife Management Area, one of the richest botanical areas of Virginia's Blue Ridge Mountains, is a 4,000-acre (16 km^{2}) Wildlife Management Area (WMA) located primarily in Fauquier County, Virginia, with small encroachments into both Warren and Clarke Counties.

== Description ==
G. Richard Thompson Wildlife Management Area comprises two separate parcels, rising in a series of steep stages to the crest of the Blue Ridge Mountains, which the area's northwestern boundary closely follows. Its northern parcel is adjacent to Sky Meadows State Park. The Appalachian Trail crosses through its boundaries along the crest of the Blue Ridge, and the WMA contains several side trails that provide access to the area.

Elevations on the property range from 700 to 2,200 feet (210 to 670 m) above sea level. A number of streams and unusual spring seeps contained within, as are several outcroppings of rock. Ten-acre (4.0 ha) Lake Thompson is also found on the property.

=== Flora ===
The area is renowned for an extensive stand of white trillium (Trillium grandiflorum) that blooms each spring. Covering an area of approximately two square miles, this stand of trilliums is reputed to be the largest plant community of its kind in Virginia and perhaps anywhere else in the United States. Other species blooming in these rich woods in early May include showy orchis (Galearis spectabilis), bear corn (Conopholis americana), and yellow lady slippers (Cypripedium parviflorum). In the seepage swamps grow several species that are usually associated with more northern regions or higher elevations of the Appalachians, such as Canada mayflower (Maianthemum canadense).

The WMA covers several different habitats, including second-growth deciduous forest, open grassy clearings, and cool seepage swamps at the headwaters of mountain streams. Most of the forests found on the land are hardwoods, but there is some open land at the bottom and near the top of one tract. The remains of formerly cultivated fruit trees may still be seen at the lower portion of the area.

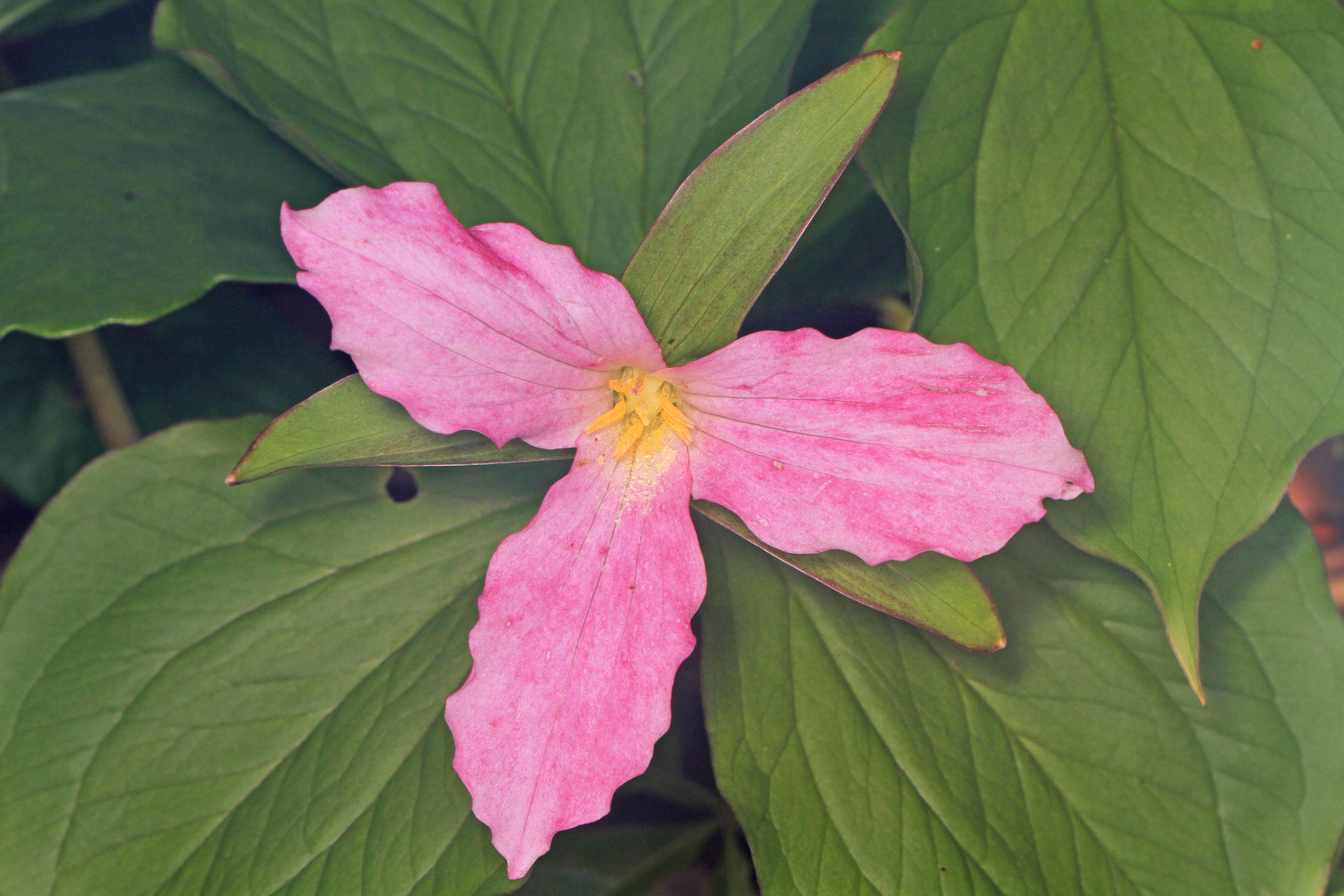
Portrait of Trillium grandiflorum

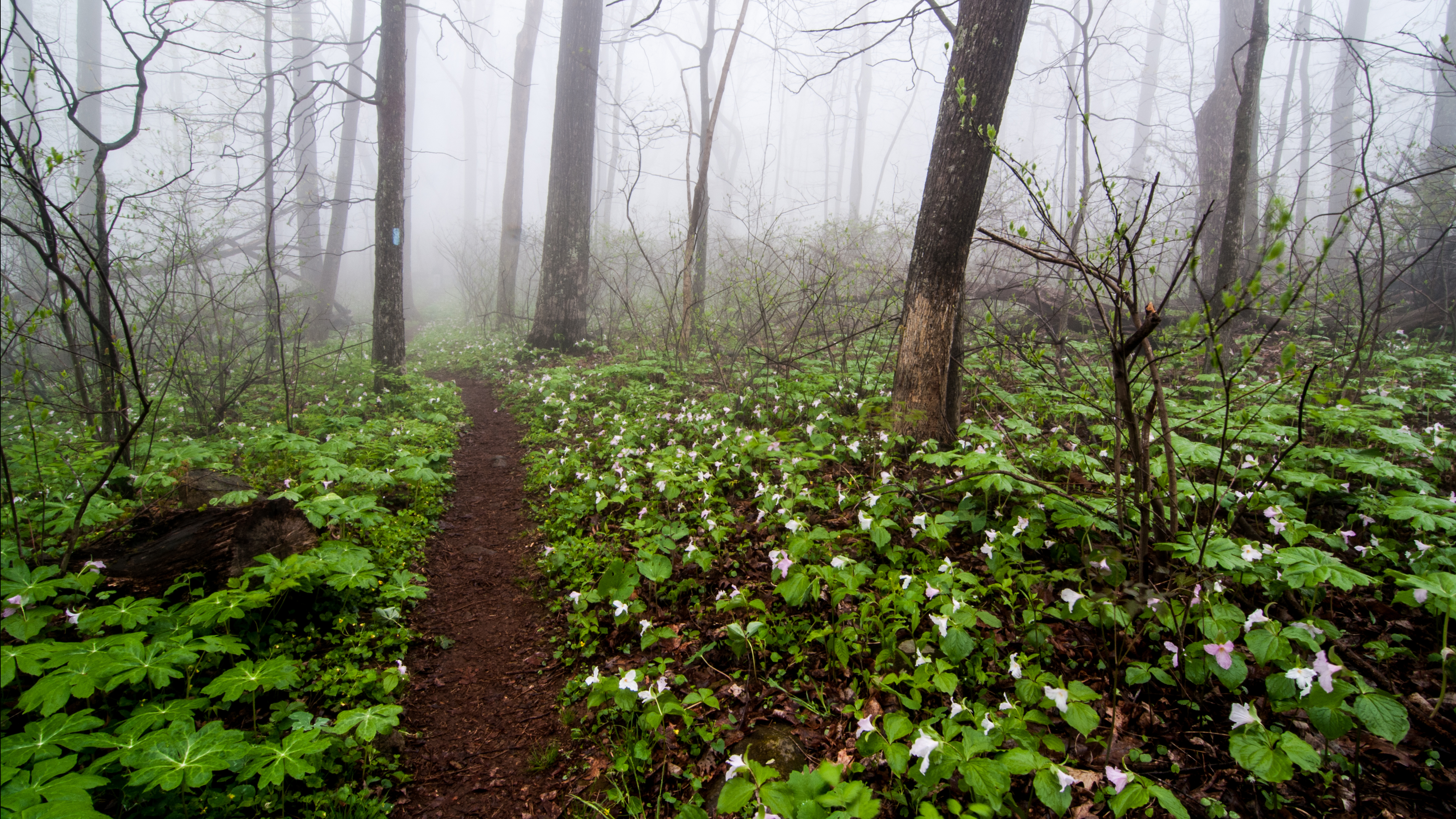
Trillium and Mayapples in bloom along the Trico Tower Trail

=== Public access ===
G. Richard Thompson Wildlife Management Area is owned and maintained by the Virginia Department of Game and Inland Fisheries. The area is open to the public for hunting, trapping, fishing, hiking, horseback riding, boating, and primitive camping. Lake Thompson is annually stocked with trout; populations of other sportfish were negatively impacted by unplanned lake drainage events in 2008 and 2010. Access for persons 17 years of age or older requires a valid hunting or fishing permit, a current Virginia boat registration, or a WMA access permit.

== See also ==
- List of Virginia Wildlife Management Areas
