= Mockhorn Island Wildlife Management Area =

Park in Northampton County, Virginia, United States

- IUCN category V (protected landscape/seascape)
- Location within Virginia Location within the United States
- Location: Northampton County, Virginia
- Coordinates: 37°13′48″N 75°53′36″W
- Area: 7,356 acres (29.77 km^{2})
- Governing body: Virginia Department of Game and Inland Fisheries

Mockhorn Island Wildlife Management Area is a 7,356-acre (29.77 km^{2}) Wildlife Management Area (WMA) in Northampton County on the Eastern Shore of Virginia. The larger of its two tracts is Mockhorn Island, a 7,000-acre (28 km^{2}) island separated from the mainland Eastern Shore and the Virginia Barrier Islands by shallow bays and consisting mainly of tidal marshland along the Atlantic coast; in addition, the area contains a 356-acre (1.44 km^{2}) tract of marsh and upland areas on the mainland. Much of Mockhorn Island is submerged except at low tide. Although much of the island is composed of periodically inundated cordgrass, several hummocks that remain above water host loblolly pine, eastern redcedar, southern wax myrtle, greenbriar, honeysuckle, and poison ivy. The area intends to preserve the natural state of the island.

Mockhorn Island WMA is owned and maintained by the Virginia Department of Game and Inland Fisheries. Although Mockhorn Island itself is accessible only by boat, the area is open to the public for waterfowl hunting; additional species may be hunted on the smaller mainland tract. Fishing, hiking, and primitive camping are also permitted at the area. Access for persons 17 years of age or older requires a valid hunting or fishing permit, a current Virginia boat registration, or a WMA access permit.

== History ==
Mockhorn island was first settled by Europeans in the 17th century for the purpose of establishing a saltworks. In the early 19th century tracts of the island were sold off to owners who pastured cattle on the island. After the Civil War and the completion of the New York, Philadelphia and Norfolk Railroad the Virginia barrier islands experienced increased recreational use and several extensive waterfowl hunting clubs catering to wealthy sportsmen from northern cities were built. The waterfowl hunting club on Mockhorn Island was started by Nathan Cobb, Jr. a market hunter and renowned decoy carver in the mid-1800s. His father Nathan Cobb, Sr. had founded another sportsman's resort, the Cobb Island Hunt Club, on Cobb Island a barrier island off Virginia's Eastern Shore.

In 1902, Larimer A. Cushman, owner of the Cushman Bakeries in New York City, bought Mockhorn Island. He expanded Cobb's existing hunting lodge and made it a comfortable home, built a barn and a smoke house, cleared pastures for cattle and fields for growing alfalfa. Cushman kept a herd of Angus cattle confined within a 4-feet high concrete sea wall he built around the perimeter of the low lying farm to keep sea water from flooding his fields during high tides. After Larimer's retirement from the bakery business, the Cushmans moved south and lived year-round at the farm and called it their "Kingdom".

Even though the Cushman farm was nearly self-sufficient, life on the remote island was not easy. The farm was off grid and only accessible by boat. Swarms of mosquitos and biting flies caused the cattle to often stay over their backs in the water during the warmer months. Nor'easters and hurricanes resulted in storm surges that periodically flooded the island and poisoned the fields with salt water. The attempt to farm the marshy land ultimately failed and after Larimer Cushman's death in 1948, his widow sold the island to T.A.D. Jones. Jones, a college football coach turned businessman used the compound for nearly a decade to entertain guests including military and political leaders who were flown in by helicopter for duck hunting trips. Jones died in 1957 and Mockhorn Island was acquired in 1959 by the Commonwealth of Virginia for use as a wildlife management area.

The ruins of the Cushman home and several outbuildings still stand on the island, however the barn collapsed in 2019. After falling in 2021 Only one fire control tower built during World War II to support coast artillery batteries at nearby Fort John Custis and Fort Story still stands on Mockhorn Island.

== See also ==
- List of Virginia Wildlife Management Areas
