= James River Wildlife Management Area =

Park in Nelson County, Virginia, United States

- IUCN category V (protected landscape/seascape)
- Location within Virginia Location within the United States
- Location: Nelson County, Virginia
- Nearest city: Wingina
- Coordinates: 37°40′36″N 78°43′40″W
- Area: 1,213 acres (4.91 km^{2})
- Governing body: Virginia Department of Wildlife Resources

James River Wildlife Management Area is a 1,213-acre (4.91 km^{2}) Wildlife Management Area (WMA) in Nelson County, Virginia, near the town of Wingina. It consists of hilly woodland and relatively level bottomland along slightly more than one mile (1.6 km) of the James River. Elevations at the area range from 350 to 500 feet (110 to 150 m) above sea level.

About 200 acres (0.81 km^{2}) of property are open land that was once used for pasture and the growth of crops, although the older fields now support stands of Virginia pine. The remainder of the land is forested with a mix of pine, oak, and hickory. Various techniques are used to enhance the upland habitat, including prescribed burning and the management of annual and perennial plantings. Eight acres (3.2 ha) of impounded marsh have also been developed to provide food for waterfowl.

James River WMA is owned and maintained by the Virginia Department of Wildlife Resources. The area is open to the public for hunting and trapping, with game opportunities, including deer, rabbit, wild turkey, waterfowl, dove, and quail. Fishing, hiking, horseback riding, boating, and primitive camping are also permitted. Access for persons 17 years of age or older requires a valid hunting or fishing permit, a current Virginia boat registration, or a WMA access permit.

== See also ==
- List of Virginia Wildlife Management Areas
