= Featherfin Wildlife Management Area =

Protected area of Virginia, United States

- IUCN category V (protected landscape/seascape)
- Location within Virginia Location within the United States
- Location: Prince Edward, Appomattox, and Buckingham counties, Virginia
- Nearest city: Farmville
- Coordinates: 37°22′19″N 78°34′57″W
- Area: 2,800 acres (11 km^{2})
- Governing body: Virginia Department of Game and Inland Fisheries

Featherfin Wildlife Management Area is a 2,800-acre (11 km^{2}) Wildlife Management Area (WMA) in Prince Edward, Appomattox, and Buckingham counties, Virginia. It covers forests and marshland along 10 miles (16 km) of the Appomattox River; many stands of hardwood and pine (primarily loblolly) may be found within its boundaries. Some of these are found on old farm fields.

Featherfin WMA is owned and maintained by the Virginia Department of Game and Inland Fisheries. The area is open to the public for hunting, fishing, hiking, and primitive camping. Horseback riding is not permitted. Access for persons 17 years of age or older requires a valid hunting or fishing permit, a current Virginia boat registration, or a WMA access permit.

== See also ==
- List of Virginia Wildlife Management Areas
