= Chickahominy Wildlife Management Area =

Protected area of Virginia, United States

- IUCN category V (protected landscape/seascape)
- Location within Virginia Location within the United States
- Location: Charles City County, Virginia
- Coordinates: 37°19′08″N 76°54′45″W
- Area: 5,217 acres (21.11 km^{2})
- Governing body: Virginia Department of Wildlife Resources

Chickahominy Wildlife Management Area is a 5,217-acre (21.11 km^{2}) Wildlife Management Area (WMA) in Charles City County, Virginia. It is the only WMA located in the coastal plain of tidewater Virginia consisting primarily of forested uplands with a lesser amount of wetland habitat. The area's namesake is the Chickahominy River, a tidal river which forms its eastern boundary. Morris Creek flows through the property, forming its southern boundary; other smaller creeks and marshes are also present. The forests mainly consist of mixed hardwoods and pines. The preserve is nearly level, with elevations ranging from 25 to 50 feet (7.6 to 15.2 m) above sea level.

Chickahominy WMA is owned and maintained by the Virginia Department of Wildlife Resources. The area is open to the public for hunting, trapping, fishing, hiking, horseback riding, boating, and primitive camping. A shooting range for sighting-in firearms is available, in addition to a boat launch on Morris Creek which provides access to both the Chickahominy and James rivers. Access for persons 17 years of age or older requires a valid hunting or fishing permit, a current Virginia boat registration, or a WMA access permit.

== See also ==
- List of Virginia Wildlife Management Areas
