= Powhatan Wildlife Management Area =

Protected area of Virginia, United States

- IUCN category V (protected landscape/seascape)
- Location within Virginia Location within the United States
- Location: Powhatan County, Virginia
- Nearest city: Powhatan
- Coordinates: 37°32′22″N 77°59′44″W
- Area: 4,462 acres (18.06 km^{2})
- Governing body: Virginia Department of Game and Inland Fisheries

Powhatan Wildlife Management Area is a 4,462-acre (18.06 km^{2}) Wildlife Management Area (WMA) in Powhatan County, Virginia. Consisting primarily of former farmland, much of the area is currently covered by open fields; these combine with mature and new forest growth to provide habitat for a diverse array of wildlife. The property is divided by Route 60 and contains one interior parcel of privately owned land. The elevation of the property is between 200 and 350 feet (61 and 107 m) above sea level.

The area is drained by several small streams that make their way to Sallee Creek, a tributary to the James River. Located on the property are the two Powhatan Lakes, which are 32 and 26 acres (13 and 11 ha) in size; an additional four farm ponds, numerous beaver ponds, marshes along Sallee Creek, and a small impoundment for waterfowl combine to provide water for the area.

Powhatan WMA is owned and maintained by the Virginia Department of Game and Inland Fisheries. The area is open to the public for hunting, trapping, fishing, hiking, boating, horseback riding, and primitive camping. Access for persons 17 years of age or older requires a valid hunting or fishing permit, a current Virginia boat registration, or a WMA access permit.

== See also ==
- List of Virginia Wildlife Management Areas
