= Highland Wildlife Management Area =

Protected area of Virginia, United States

- IUCN category V (protected landscape/seascape)
- Location within Virginia Location within the United States
- Location: Highland County, Virginia
- Nearest city: Staunton
- Coordinates: 38°19′28″N 79°34′10″W
- Area: 14,283 acres (57.80 km^{2})
- Governing body: Virginia Department of Game and Inland Fisheries

Highland Wildlife Management Area is a 14,283-acre (22.3 sq mi; 57.8 km^{2}) Wildlife Management Area in Highland County, Virginia. It consists of three separate tracts of land, centered on Jack Mountain, Bullpasture Mountain, and Little Doe Hill; elevations in the area range from 1,800 to 4,390 feet (550 to 1,340 m) above sea level.

With the exception of an 80-acre (32 ha) clearing on Jack Mountain that was once used as summer pasture land, the area is nearly completely covered by upland hardwood forest, consisting mainly of oaks and hickories. The Bullpasture River flows through the area and is regularly stocked with trout. The area is carefully managed to enhance wildlife habitat, including maintaining small clearings as open space for wildlife, and encouraging the growth of mast-producing trees to provide food.

Highland Wildlife Management Area is owned and maintained by the Virginia Department of Game and Inland Fisheries. The area offers a variety of exciting outdoor activities for all to enjoy, including hunting, trapping, fishing, hiking, and horseback riding—perfect for adventure seekers and nature lovers alike and primitive camping. Access for persons 17 years of age or older requires a valid hunting or fishing permit, or a WMA access permit.

== See also ==
- List of Virginia Wildlife Management Areas
