= Rapidan =

Rapidan may refer to:

== Minnesota ==
- Rapidan Township, Blue Earth County, Minnesota
  - Rapidan, Minnesota
  - Rapidan Dam, a concrete gravity dam on the Blue Earth River

== Virginia ==
- Rapidan, Virginia
- Rapidan Camp, President Hoover's retreat
- Rapidan River
- Rapidan Wildlife Management Area

== Other uses ==
- USS Rapidan (1919–1946), a Patoka-class replenishment oiler

== See also ==
- Rapydan, a local anesthetic combination
