= Hog Island Wildlife Management Area =

Protected area of Virginia, United States

- IUCN category V (protected landscape/seascape)
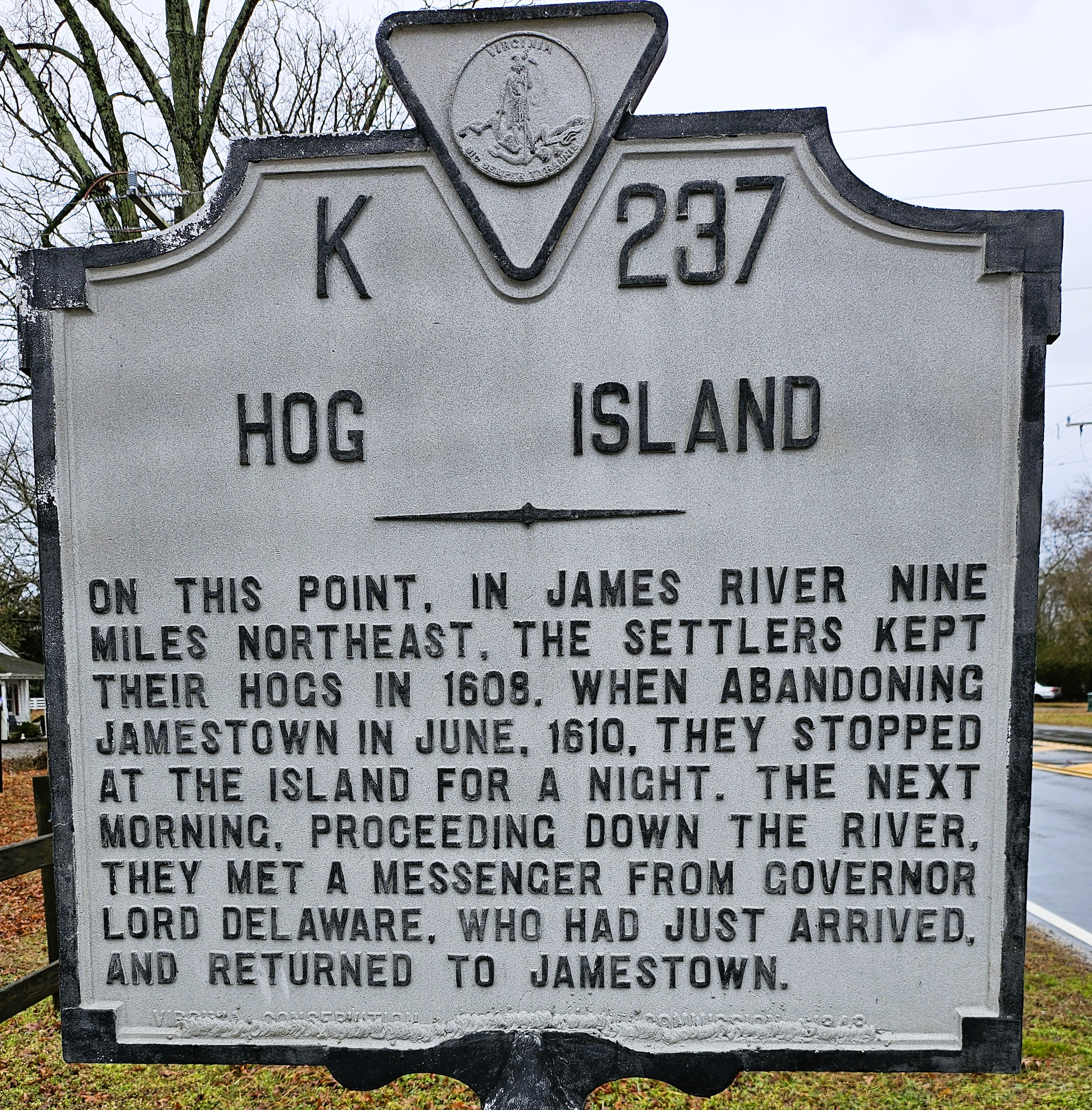
- Historical marker

- Location within Virginia Location within the United States
- Location: Surry and Isle of Wight counties, Virginia
- Coordinates: 37°10′40″N 76°40′54″W
- Area: 3,908 acres (15.82 km^{2})
- Governing body: Virginia Department of Game and Inland Fisheries

Hog Island Wildlife Management Area is a 3,908-acre (15.82 km^{2}) Wildlife Management Area along the lower James River in Virginia. The peninsular tip was named "Hogg Island [sic]" in 1608 by Jamestown settlers who released three pigs in the area, who became feral and multiplied. In colonial times Lawnes Creek (which runs among the three separate tracts of land now managed by the Virginia Department of Game and Inland Fisheries) became the dividing line between Surry County and Isle of Wight County. The Hog Island and Carlisle tracts are in Surry County, and the Stewart Tract in Isle of Wight County. However, the Surry Nuclear Power Plant blocks Hog Island road, so access to the Hog Island tract has been extremely limited since 9/11/01.

== History ==
Archeological excavations have unearthed artifacts from native peoples dating before 1000 BCE.

In 1607, Jamestown Island was settled by the English. To prevent attacks from wolves, the colonists deposited pigs across the James River on an "Ile of Hoggs". By the end of 1608, the population of Hog Island had grown to 60 pigs. In November 1609, the native Powhatan destroyed the livestock to inhibit the English from surviving the winter.

== Description ==
The Carlyle Tract on the peninsula's eastern side includes the highest elevations, at about 35 feet (11 m) above sea level. Reforested with Loblolly pine, cover crops are also grown to benefit wildlife. The low-elevation land is flat and open, and includes about 50 acres of tidal marshland and controlled ponds. The Hog Island Tract contains an extensive system of dikes to help create seasonally flooded areas to provide food and habitat for wintering waterfowl and migrating birds; Agricultural crops are also grown in the area.

== Public access ==
The Virginia Department of Game and Inland Fisheries states that it holds all three tracts open to the public for hunting, trapping, fishing, hiking, and boating from sunrise to sunset seven days per week. However, access to the Hog Island tract requires transit through lands of Dominion Energy, which operates the Surry Nuclear Power Plant. However, access to the Lawne's Creek boat launch is permitted, via a road crossing Hog Island Road before the nuclear plant. Access to all three tracts is restricted on Wednesdays in September for managed goose and teal hunts, and controlled hunts are also held in October (for deer) and November (for ducks). Other closed days (or activity-specific closures) are posted on the website. The agency has a quota system for deer and waterfowl hunting permits. All persons 17 years of age or older must have a valid WMA permit, to be displayed on demand to a conservation officer. Hunting or fishing requires a specialized permit (daily as well as annual permits area available); boating requires a current Virginia boat registration; groups of 12 or more persons also require a special use access permit.

The Hog Island Tract includes a road with ten vehicle parking areas and two viewing platforms. Large numbers of bald eagles are frequently observed on and near the property. Another road, on the Carlisle Tract, allows access to a boat ramp. Horseback riding and primitive camping are permitted only within the Carlisle Tract.

The area is included on the Captain John Smith Chesapeake National Historic Trail along the James River.

== See also ==
- List of Virginia Wildlife Management Areas
