= Weston Wildlife Management Area =

Protected area of Virginia, United States

- IUCN category V (protected landscape/seascape)
- Location within Virginia Location within the United States
- Location: Fauquier County, Virginia
- Coordinates: 38°39′45″N 77°41′34″W
- Area: 271 acres (110 ha)
- Established: 1959
- Governing body: Virginia Department of Game and Inland Fisheries

Weston Wildlife Management Area is a 271-acre (110 ha) Wildlife Management Area (WMA) in Fauquier County, Virginia, near the town of Casanova. Although small in size compared to other WMAs in the state, it nevertheless features a variety of habitats, including hardwood forests along Turkey Run. Former tracts of farmland are reverting to cedar thickets, and there are a number of fields around the area as well, divided by well-maintained hedgerows. Turkey Run provides a water supply year-round, and forms the eastern boundary of the property. Within the area's boundaries is a 10-acre (40,000 m^{2}) parcel of privately owned land.

Weston WMA is owned and maintained by the Virginia Department of Game and Inland Fisheries. The area is open to the public for fishing, hiking, horseback riding, and primitive camping. Firearms are not permitted, although a "chase-only" season is available for training hunting hounds. Access for persons 17 years of age or older requires a valid hunting or fishing permit, or a WMA access permit.

== See also ==
- List of Virginia Wildlife Management Areas
