= Conway River =

Conway River can refer to a number of rivers, including:

- Conway River, New Zealand
- Conway River (Virginia)
- River Conway, Wales, in North Wales, former spelling of the River Conwy.
