= Land's End Wildlife Management Area =

Wildlife Management Area in King George County, Virginia

- IUCN category V (protected landscape/seascape)
- Location within Virginia Location within the United States
- Location: King George County, Virginia
- Coordinates: 38°09′44″N 77°06′51″W
- Area: 462 acres (187 ha)
- Established: 1966
- Governing body: Virginia Department of Game and Inland Fisheries

Land's End Wildlife Management Area is a 462-acre (187 ha) Wildlife Management Area (WMA) in southeastern King George County, Virginia. The site is a mixture of open farmland, woodland, and wetland, and comprises two separate tracts: The 50-acre (20 ha) Salem Church Tract, and the 412-acre (167 ha) Land's End Tract. The area is bordered on two sides by the Rappahannock River and on one by Jett's Creek, and is primarily managed as a refuge for migrating waterfowl; Canada geese can often be seen in the winter feeding on fields of corn, milo, and winter wheat in the area, and resting in the nearby Nanzatico Bay. Among the other species often seen on the property are bald eagles, deer, wild turkey, and songbirds.

The area was the site of much interaction between the Nanzatico Tribe and English settlers during the seventeenth century. It was established as a WMA by the Virginia Department of Game and Inland Fisheries in 1966, and was nominated for inclusion in the Virginia Landmarks Register and National Register of Historic Places in 1972.

Land's End WMA is open to the public; however, as a dedicated refuge, hunting is not permitted. Hiking and wildlife viewing are permitted on the property. Access for persons 17 years of age or older requires a valid hunting or fishing permit, or a WMA access permit.

== See also ==
- List of Virginia Wildlife Management Areas
