= Gathright =

Gathright may refer to:

== People ==
- Thomas S. Gathright (1829–1880), American educator and masonic leader
- Joey Gathright (born 1981), American baseball outfielder

== Places ==
- Gathright Dam, an embankment dam in Alleghany County, Virginia
- T. M. Gathright Wildlife Management Area, a state-managed protected area in Bath County, Virginia

== See also ==
- Linda Harriott-Gathright, American politician
