= Game Farm Marsh Wildlife Management Area =

Protected area of Virginia, United States

- IUCN category V (protected landscape/seascape)
- Location within Virginia Location within the United States
- Location: New Kent County, Virginia
- Coordinates: 37°25′15″N 77°00′05″W
- Area: 429 acres (174 ha)
- Governing body: Virginia Department of Game and Inland Fisheries

Game Farm Marsh Wildlife Management Area is a 429-acre (174 ha) Wildlife Management Area in New Kent County, Virginia. It consists entirely of wetland habitat on the northern shore of Chickahominy Lake and can only be accessed by boat. Much of the property is covered by bald cypress swamp with dark, tannin-rich waters, thick with submerged vegetation and covered by duck weed in the warmer months. Two creeks allow access into the interior.

Although the area adjoins a Virginia Department of Forestry tree farm, Game Farm Marsh Wildlife Management Area is owned and maintained by the Virginia Department of Game and Inland Fisheries. The area is open to the public for waterfowl hunting, trapping, fishing, and boating. Access for persons 17 years of age or older requires a valid hunting or fishing permit, a current Virginia boat registration, or a WMA access permit.

== See also ==
- List of Virginia Wildlife Management Areas
