= Princess Anne Wildlife Management Area =

Protected area of Virginia, United States

- IUCN category V (protected landscape/seascape)
- Location within Virginia Location within the United States
- Location: Virginia Beach, Virginia
- Coordinates: 36°35′10″N 75°59′05″W
- Area: 1,546 acres (6.26 km^{2})
- Governing body: Virginia Department of Wildlife Resources

Princess Anne Wildlife Management Area is a 1,546-acre (6.26 km^{2}) Wildlife Management Area (WMA) in Virginia Beach, Virginia. The area comprises four tracts; the Beasely, Trojan, and Whitehurst tracts are located on the western shore of Back Bay, separated from the Atlantic Ocean by False Cape, while the Pocahontas Tract, consisting of a number of marshy islands, is at the south end of the bay. A variety of natural communities may be found on all tracts, and water levels are manipulated to help promote the growth of food for waterfowl that migrate and overwinter in the area.

Princess Anne WMA is owned and maintained by the Virginia Department of Wildlife Resources. The area is open to the public for regulated hunting, with a focus on waterfowl hunting; a cooperative agreement also allows access to False Cape State Park for waterfowl and deer hunting. Recreational opportunities within Princess Anne WMA include fishing, hiking, horseback riding, and boating. Primitive camping is not permitted within the WMA however False Cape State Park allows such activity. Access for persons 17 years of age or older requires a valid hunting or fishing permit, a current Virginia boat registration, or a WMA access permit.

== See also ==
- List of Virginia Wildlife Management Areas
