= Beartown Mountain =

Mountain in Virginia, United States

Highest point
- Elevation: 4,689 ft (1,429 m)
- Prominence: 1,528 ft (466 m)
- Coordinates: 36°56′10″N 81°53′11″W

Geography
- Location: Russell County, Virginia, U.S.
- Parent range: Clinch Mountain
- Topo map: USGS Elk Garden

Beartown Mountain is in the Clinch Mountain range, which is in eastern Russell County, Virginia, United States. At 4,689 feet (1,429 m), it is the 7th highest summit in Virginia. It is the 41st highest County High Point of the Eastern United States.

Beartown Mountain is in the 25,477-acre (103.10 km^{2}) Clinch Mountain Wildlife Management Area. The ridgelines south and northeast of the summit are the approximate boundary for the Wildlife Management Area.
