= Clinch Mountain Wildlife Management Area =

Protected area in Virginia, United States

- IUCN category V (protected landscape/seascape)
- Location within Virginia Location within the United States
- Location: Smyth, Washington, Russell, and Tazewell counties, Virginia
- Coordinates: 36°56′10″N 81°49′40″W
- Area: 25,477 acres (103.10 km^{2})
- Governing body: Virginia Department of Game and Inland Fisheries

Clinch Mountain Wildlife Management Area is a 25,477-acre (103.10 km^{2}) Wildlife Management Area (WMA) in Virginia. It is the second-largest WMA in the Commonwealth, covering portions of Smyth, Washington, Russell, and Tazewell counties.

== Description ==
Clinch Mountain Wildlife Management Area is dominated by steep mountains and narrow valleys, with elevations ranging from 1,600 feet (490 m) above sea level to 4,700 feet (1,400 m) at the summit of Beartown Mountain. It is due to this difference in elevation that an unusual type of forest, containing species found in both the southern and northern United States, has developed. The land was virgin forest until late in the nineteenth century, and some evidence of logging, including portions of the former narrow gauge railroad, can still be seen. Laurel Bed Lake, a 330-acre (1.3 km^{2}) reservoir, is located within the area, in addition to Big Tumbling Creek and several of its tributaries.

Given the variety of landscapes which it covers, and the range in elevation found throughout the area, it is the most biologically diverse of the holdings of the Virginia Department of Game and Inland Fisheries.

== Public access ==
Clinch Mountain Wildlife Management Area is open to the public for hunting, trapping, fishing, hiking, boating, and primitive camping, although some interior roads are seasonally closed. Improvements include a sighting-in range for firearms, an archery shooting range, and two boat ramps on Laurel Bed Lake. Horseback riding is permitted on gravel roads only. Access for persons 17 years of age or older requires a valid hunting or fishing permit, a current Virginia boat registration, or a WMA access permit.

== See also ==
- List of Virginia Wildlife Management Areas
