= Ragged Island Wildlife Management Area =

Protected area of Virginia, United States

- IUCN category V (protected landscape/seascape)
- Location within Virginia Location within the United States
- Location: Isle of Wight County, Virginia
- Coordinates: 36°57′32″N 76°30′13″W
- Area: 1,537 acres (6.22 km^{2})
- Governing body: Virginia Department of Game and Inland Fisheries

Ragged Island Wildlife Management Area, also known as Ragged Island Wildlife Refuge, is a 1,537-acre (6.22 km^{2}) Wildlife Management Area (WMA) in Isle of Wight County, Virginia. Within a few miles of one of Virginia's busiest and most populated regions is the Ragged Island Wildlife Management Area, a largely unspoiled area of marshland and scattered woody hummocks. It includes unspoiled brackish marsh and small pine islands adjacent the south bank of the James River. The area is dominated by vegetation such as marsh mallow, smartweed, saltmarsh cordgrass, and black needlerush, with loblolly pine as the most common tree species. Impenetrable areas of wax myrtle and greenbriar are also found on the property. The area is known in particular for its wide range of waterfowl.

Ragged Island WMA is managed by the Virginia Department of Game and Inland Fisheries. The area is open to the public for hunting, trapping, fishing, and hiking. A boardwalk allows access for viewing the marsh and its wildlife. The WMA may accessed from two parking areas on U.S. Highway 17 just south of the James River Bridge. Access for persons 17 years of age or older requires a valid hunting or fishing permit, or a WMA access permit.

== See also ==
- List of Virginia Wildlife Management Areas
