= Briery Creek Wildlife Management Area =

Protected area of Virginia, United States

- IUCN category V (protected landscape/seascape)
- Location within Virginia Location within the United States
- Location: Prince Edward County, Virginia
- Nearest town: Farmville
- Coordinates: 37°10′43″N 78°27′21″W
- Area: 3,164 acres (12.80 km^{2})
- Governing body: Virginia Department of Game and Inland Fisheries

Briery Creek Wildlife Management Area is a 3,164-acre (12.80 km^{2}) Wildlife Management Area in Prince Edward County, Virginia. With terrain typical of Virginia's south-central Piedmont, it encompasses the 845-acre (3.42 km^{2}) Briery Creek Lake, a reservoir formed by the damming of Briery Creek and Little Briery Creek. Much of the area was historically used for tobacco farming, and more recently, timber production; today the land contains a mixture of hardwoods and loblolly pine.

Briery Creek Wildlife Management Area is owned and maintained by the Virginia Department of Game and Inland Fisheries. The area is open to the public for hunting and trapping; game species include deer, turkey, quail, rabbits, and waterfowl. Fishing and boating is facilitated by two boat ramps on Briery Creek Lake. Other permissible activities include hiking, horseback riding, and primitive camping. Access for persons 17 years of age or older requires a valid hunting or fishing permit, a current Virginia boat registration, or a WMA access permit.

== See also ==
- List of Virginia Wildlife Management Areas
