= Big Survey Wildlife Management Area =

Protected area of Virginia, United States

- IUCN category V (protected landscape/seascape)
- Location within Virginia Location within the United States
- Location: Wythe County, Virginia
- Nearest city: Wytheville
- Coordinates: 36°55′01″N 81°02′24″W
- Area: 7,500 acres (30 km^{2})
- Governing body: Virginia Department of Game and Inland Fisheries

Big Survey Wildlife Management Area is a 7,500-acre (30 km^{2}) Wildlife Management Area in Wythe County, Virginia. The preserve's woodland sits on four mountain ridges and divides the watersheds of Reed and Cripple creeks in the New River Valley. Among the trees and shrubs to be found there are rhododendron, azalea, oak, hickory, and pine.

Big Survey Wildlife Management Area is owned and maintained by the Virginia Department of Game and Inland Fisheries. The area is open to the public for hunting, hiking, horseback riding, and camping. Access for persons 17 years of age or older requires a valid hunting permit, fishing permit, or WMA access permit.

== See also ==
- List of Virginia Wildlife Management Areas
