= Horsepen Lake Wildlife Management Area =

Protected area of Virginia, United States

- IUCN category V (protected landscape/seascape)
- Location within Virginia Location within the United States
- Location: Buckingham County, Virginia
- Nearest city: Andersonville
- Coordinates: 37°30′17″N 78°33′24″W
- Area: 2,910 acres (11.8 km^{2})
- Governing body: Virginia Department of Game and Inland Fisheries

Horsepen Lake Wildlife Management Area is a 2,910-acre (11.8 km^{2}) Wildlife Management Area in Buckingham County, Virginia. It sits at about 500 feet (150 m) above sea level on the southeastern part of the drainage area of the Slate River. The area includes small streams, beaver ponds, and forests of pine, oak, and hickory. The 18-acre (7.3 ha) Horsepen Lake is also located on the property.

Horsepen Lake Wildlife Management Area is owned and maintained by the Virginia Department of Game and Inland Fisheries. The area is open to the public for hunting, trapping, fishing, hiking, horseback riding, boating, and primitive camping. Improvements include numerous parking areas, a boat launch, and a picnic shelter. Access for persons 17 years of age or older requires a valid hunting or fishing permit, a current Virginia boat registration, or a WMA access permit.

== See also ==
- List of Virginia Wildlife Management Areas
