= Cavalier Wildlife Management Area =

Protected area of Virginia, United States

- IUCN category V (protected landscape/seascape)
- Location within Virginia Location within the United States
- Location: Chesapeake, Virginia
- Coordinates: 36°34′20″N 76°19′22″W
- Area: 4,550 acres (18.4 km^{2})
- Governing body: Virginia Department of Game and Inland Fisheries

Cavalier Wildlife Management Area is a 4,550-acre (18.4 km^{2}) Wildlife Management Area in Chesapeake, Virginia. It preserves habitat for a number of species, including black bear, canebrake rattlesnakes, white-tailed deer, eastern wild turkeys, and many varieties of songbirds.

The preserve comprises two separate tracts of land. The 3,800-acre (15 km^{2}) main tract is located about 2.5 miles (4.0 km) east of the Great Dismal Swamp National Wildlife Refuge and adjacent to the Virginia–North Carolina border; it was once a part of the Great Dismal Swamp but was drained more than 200 years ago. The main tract today is typified by recently logged forestlands planted with young pine. A smaller, 758-acre (3.07 km^{2}) tract lies about six miles (9.7 km) north of the main area of land, immediately adjacent to the Great Dismal Swamp National Wildlife Refuge.

The area is open to the public for seasonal hunting, trapping, fishing, hiking, and primitive camping. Firearms are prohibited in the Dismal Swamp tract, where only bow-hunting is permitted; firearms may be used for hunting within the main tract. Neither area permits horseback riding.

Cavalier Wildlife Management Area is owned and maintained by the Virginia Department of Game and Inland Fisheries. Access for persons 17 years of age or older requires a valid hunting or fishing permit, or a WMA access permit.

== See also ==
- List of Virginia Wildlife Management Areas
