= Chester F. Phelps Wildlife Management Area =

Protected area of Virginia, United States

- IUCN category V (protected landscape/seascape)
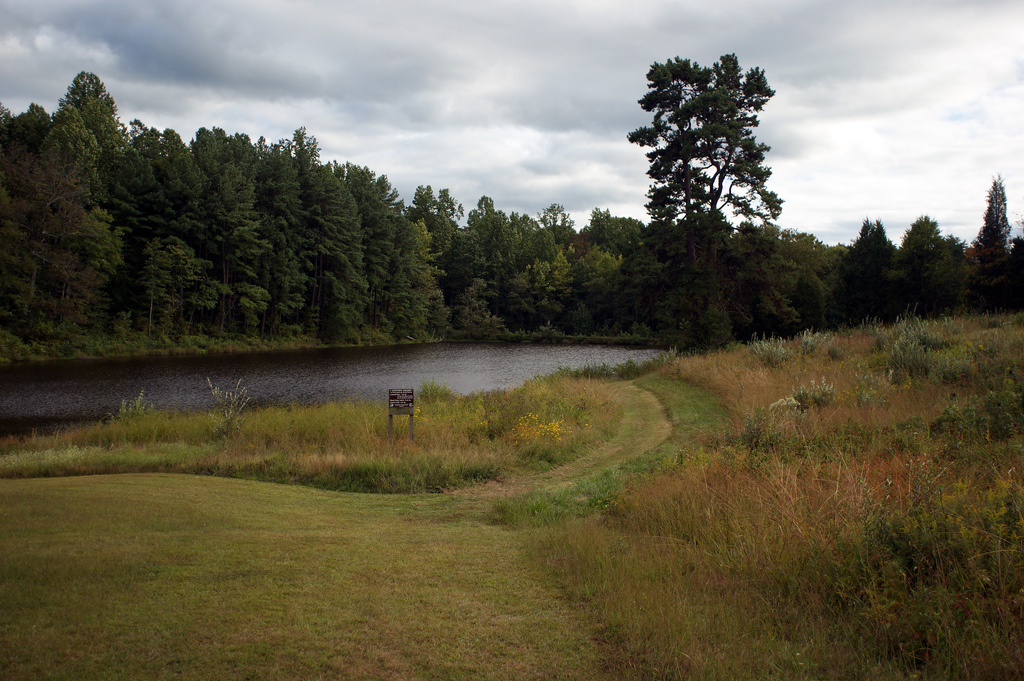
- Phelps Pond

- Location within Northern Virginia Location within Virginia Location within the United States
- Location: Fauquier and Culpeper counties, Virginia
- Nearest city: Sumerduck
- Coordinates: 38°27′12″N 77°44′54″W
- Area: 4,539 acres (18.37 km^{2})
- Governing body: Virginia Department of Game and Inland Fisheries

Chester F. Phelps Wildlife Management Area (also known as the C.F. Phelps Wildlife Management Area) is a 4,539-acre (18.37 km^{2}) Wildlife Management Area located in Fauquier and Culpeper counties, Virginia. It contains over 1,000 acres (4 km^{2}) of open land previously used for agriculture; additional open areas may be found within the forests on the property. Most of the terrain is rolling, low, and shallow; the steepest land can be seen near the Rappahannock River, which forms a large part of the property's western border. A number of small streams cross the land, and a three-acre (12,000 m^{2}) pond is located near its center. The forests on the property contain both pine and hardwood.

The area allows seasonal hunting for deer, turkey, small game, and waterfowl. A shooting range for sighting-in rifles is available. Fishing includes opportunities for bluegill, sunfish, carp, bass, and channel catfish in Phelps Pond; the Rappahannock River at Kelly's Ford contains smallmouth bass, largemouth bass, rock bass, sunfish, carp, channel catfish, and suckers. A canoe/kayak boat ramp is available at Kelly's Ford. Other permissible activities include fishing, hiking, horseback riding, boating, and primitive camping.

Chester F. Phelps Wildlife Management Area is owned and maintained by the Virginia Department of Game and Inland Fisheries. Access for persons 17 years of age or older requires a valid hunting or fishing permit, or a WMA access permit.

== See also ==
- List of Virginia Wildlife Management Areas
