= Pettigrew Wildlife Management Area =

Protected area of Virginia, United States

- IUCN category V (protected landscape/seascape)
- Location within Virginia Location within the United States
- Location: Caroline County, Virginia
- Nearest city: Fredericksburg
- Coordinates: 38°12′27″N 77°16′44″W
- Area: 934 acres (378 ha)
- Governing body: Virginia Department of Game and Inland Fisheries

Pettigrew Wildlife Management Area is a 934-acre (3.78 km^{2}) Wildlife Management Area (WMA) in Caroline County, Virginia. Most of the long and narrow area's land was once part of Fort Walker. It is largely dominated by forests, including hardwood stands dominated by oak and beech, as well as stands consisting mostly of Virginia and loblolly pine. Lower vegetation including greenbriar, honeysuckle, and Virginia creeper may be seen reclaiming the property's formerly open areas. On the southern edge of the area lies Mount Creek; its drainage, aided by beavers, is the primary wetland for the area. Ware Creek, at the north end, is another major water source, and the tributaries of both streams may also be seen on the property.

Pettigrew WMA is owned and maintained by the Virginia Department of Game and Inland Fisheries. The area is open to the public for hunting, trapping, fishing, hiking, horseback riding, and primitive camping. Access for persons 17 years of age or older requires a valid hunting or fishing permit, or a WMA access permit.

== See also ==
- List of Virginia Wildlife Management Areas
