= Crooked Creek Wildlife Management Area =

Wildlife management area in Carrol County, Virginia

- IUCN category V (protected landscape/seascape)
- Location within Virginia Location within the United States
- Location: Carroll County, Virginia
- Coordinates: 36°40′03″N 80°48′48″W
- Area: 1,796 acres (7.27 km^{2})
- Governing body: Virginia Department of Game and Inland Fisheries

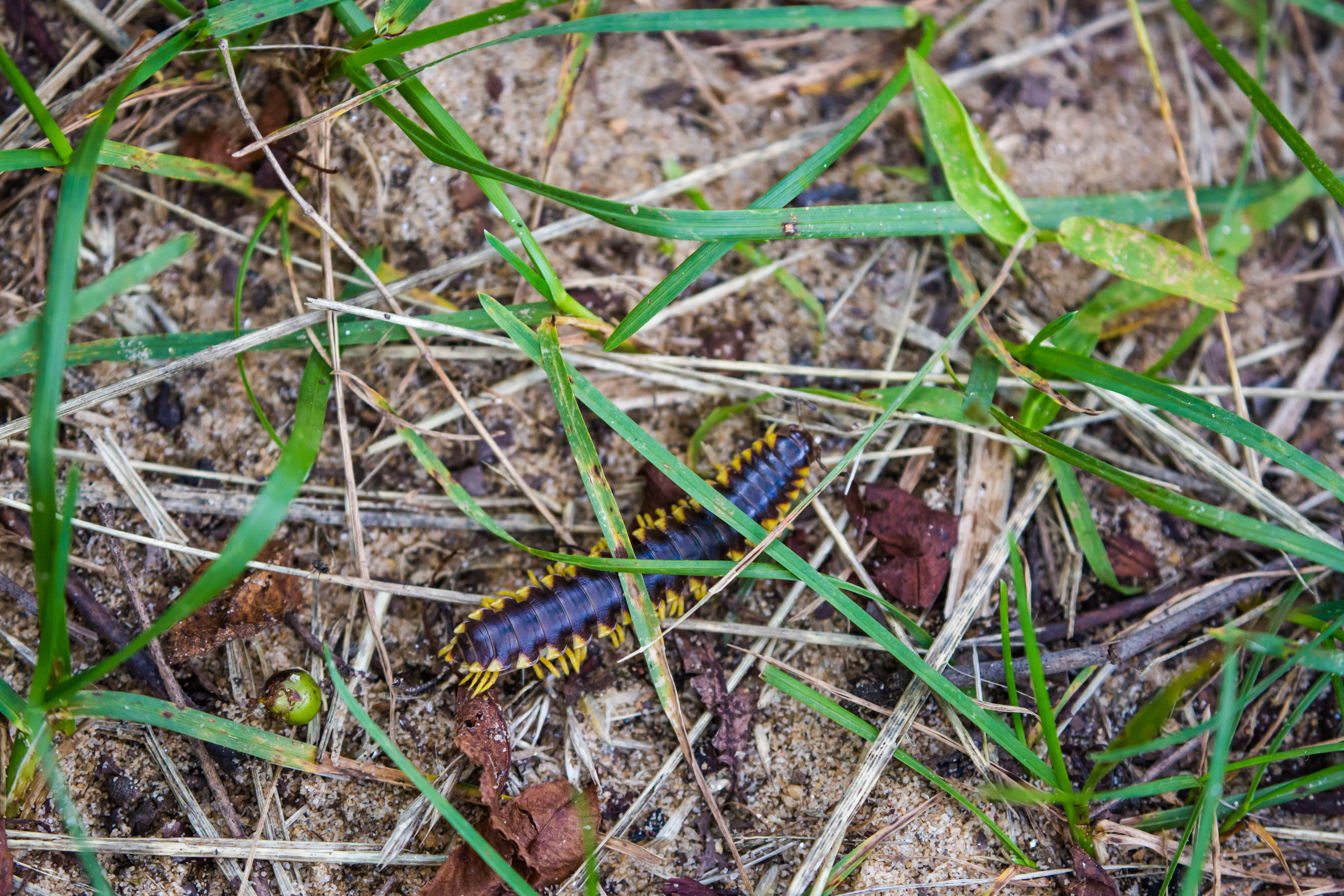
Apheloria at Crooked Creek, c. 2020

Crooked Creek Wildlife Management Area is a 1,796-acre (7.27 km^{2}) Wildlife Management Area in Carroll County, Virginia. It includes forests and open land among rolling hills ranging in elevation from 2,400 feet (730 m) above sea level to 3,000 feet (910 m). Portions of Crooked Creek and its east fork are found within the area. The area was once dominated by farmland with open areas formerly used for pasture, and the sites of a number of old houses may still be found across the property. The forests contain mixed hardwoods and pine, with Rhododendron thickets along the stream.

Crooked Creek Wildlife Management Area is owned and maintained by the Virginia Department of Game and Inland Fisheries, and is open to the public. Hunting and trapping is available, with deer, turkey and small game available. Other permissible activities include trout fishing, hiking, horseback riding, and primitive camping. Access for persons 17 years of age or older requires a valid hunting or fishing permit, or a WMA access permit.

== See also ==
- List of Virginia Wildlife Management Areas
