= White Oak Mountain Wildlife Management Area =

Protected area of Virginia, United States

- IUCN category V (protected landscape/seascape)
- Location within Virginia Location within the United States
- Location: Pittsylvania County, Virginia, U.S.
- Coordinates: 36°47′24″N 79°19′47″W
- Area: 2,748 acres (11.12 km^{2})
- Governing body: Virginia Department of Game and Inland Fisheries

White Oak Mountain Wildlife Management Area is a 2,748-acre (11.12 km^{2}) Wildlife Management Area (WMA) in Pittsylvania County, Virginia, United States.

== Topography ==
More a plateau than a mountain, the area's topography contains elevations ranging from approximately 550 to 900 feet (170 to 270 m) above sea level. The property is nearly two-thirds forest, with timber types including pines and various examples of hardwoods, such as several species of oak. Forest management, annual and perennial plantings, and controlled burns are used to enhance wildlife habitat within the area. The land is dotted with ponds ranging in size from one to five acres (4,000 to 20,200 m^{2}), and its northwest boundary is formed by the Banister River.

== Management ==
White Oak Mountain WMA is owned and maintained by the Virginia Department of Game and Inland Fisheries. The area is open to the public for hunting, trapping, fishing, hiking, horseback riding, and primitive camping. A shooting range is available for sighting-in firearms. Access for persons 17 years of age or older requires a valid hunting or fishing permit, or a WMA access permit.

== See also ==
- Virginia Wildlife Management Areas
