= Fairystone Farms Wildlife Management Area =

Protected area of Virginia, United States

- IUCN category V (protected landscape/seascape)
- Location within Virginia Location within the United States
- Location: Patrick and Henry counties, Virginia
- Nearest city: Martinsville
- Coordinates: 36°45′42″N 80°07′44″W
- Area: 5,321 acres (21.53 km^{2})
- Governing body: Virginia Department of Game and Inland Fisheries

Fairystone Farms Wildlife Management Area is a 5,321-acre (21.53 km^{2}) Wildlife Management Area in Patrick and Henry counties, Virginia. Named for the fairy stones that are common in the area, it comprises several parcels surrounding much of Fairy Stone State Park and the Philpott Reservoir in the foothills of the Blue Ridge Mountains. The area includes steep slopes and a small amount of bottomland, including an eight-acre (3.2 ha) marsh impoundment set aside for migrating waterfowl. Forests containing oak, hickory, pine, and beech are managed for the benefit of both game animals and other wildlife.

Fairystone Farms Wildlife Management Area is owned and maintained by the Virginia Department of Game and Inland Fisheries. The area is open to the public for hunting, trapping, hiking, seasonal horseback riding, and primitive camping. Access for persons 17 years of age or older requires a valid hunting or fishing permit, or a WMA access permit.

== See also ==
- List of Virginia Wildlife Management Areas
