= Virginia Board of Wildlife Resources =

Board that oversees the Virginia Department of Wildlife Resources

The Virginia Board of Wildlife Resources (formerly the Commission of Game and Inland Fisheries) oversees the Virginia Department of Wildlife Resources.

== Membership ==
The Code of Virginia provides that "the Board shall consist of not more than one member from each congressional district". Following Census 2000, Virginia was allocated 11 Congressional districts; therefore, the Board was limited to a maximum of 11 members.

Members are appointed by the Governor and confirmed by the General Assembly.

== Powers ==
The Board has power to:

- Appoint the Director of the Department,
- Acquire lands and waters in the Commonwealth,
- Establish buildings, structures, dams, lakes, ponds, public landings, wharves, or docks,
- Regulate or prohibit drilling, dredging or other operations on VDGIF property,
- Conduct operations for the preservation and propagation of game birds, game animals, fish and other wildlife,
- Introduce new species of game birds, game animals or fish to Virginia,
- Publish and distribute educational matter pertaining to wildlife,
- Collect user fees for admittance, parking, and hunting,
- Delegate power to the Director of Game and Inland Fisheries, and
- Regulate hunting, taking, capture, killing, possession, sale, purchase and transportation of wild birds, wild animals, and inland water fish.

== Rulemaking process ==
The Board holds meetings every year to consider amendments to the Virginia Administrative Code. In even-numbered years, fish and aquatic regulations are reviewed. In odd numbered years, game and terrestrial nongame wildlife regulations are reviewed. Procedures for emergency situations had not yet been developed, as of 2004.

== Well-known regulations ==
=== Snakeheads ===
A high-profile regulation issued by the Board is 4VAC15-30-40, which bans the importation of snakehead fish.

=== Wild animals ===
- 4VAC15-30-10 bans possession of wild animals in Virginia.
- 4VAC15-20-50 defines a wild animal as "Any member of the animal kingdom, except domestic animals, including without limitation any native, naturalized, or nonnative (exotic) mammal, fish, bird, amphibian, reptile, mollusk, crustacean, arthropod or other invertebrate, and includes any hybrid of them, except as otherwise specified in regulations of the board, or part, product, egg, or offspring of them, or the dead body or parts of them."

The regulation then lists 26 domestic animals (dogs, cats, horses, etc.) which are exempt from the definition. Some Virginians, such as ferret and skunk enthusiasts, would like to see additional animals added to the list of allowed pets.
