= Big Woods Wildlife Management Area =

Protected area of Virginia, United States

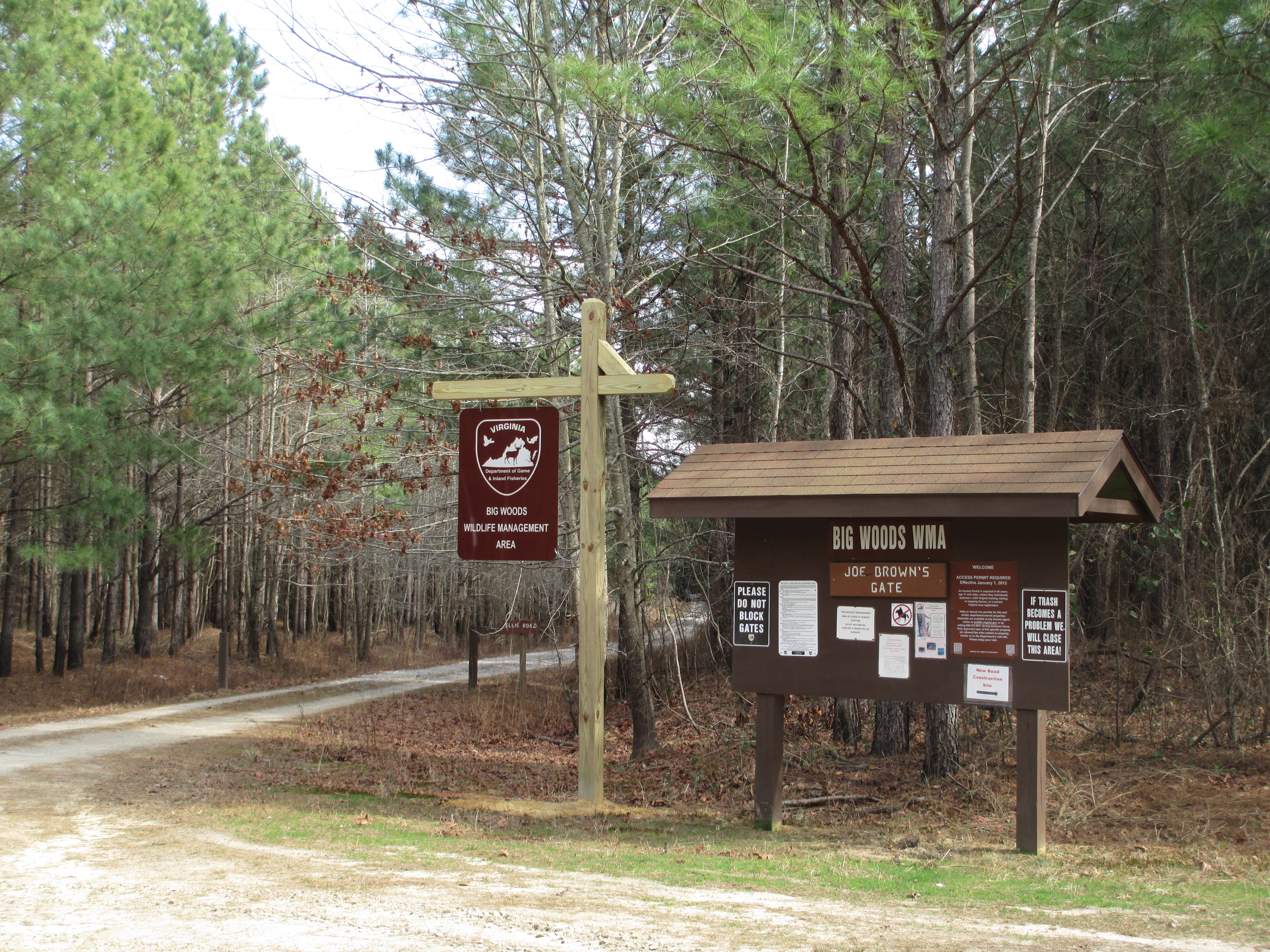
- Big Woods Wildlife Management Area entrance

- Location within Virginia Location within the United States
- Location: Sussex County, Virginia
- Coordinates: 36°55′58″N 77°05′00″W
- Area: 4,173 acres (16.89 km^{2})
- Established: 2010
- Governing body: Virginia Department of Game and Inland Fisheries

Big Woods Wildlife Management Area is a 4,173-acre (16.89 km^{2}) Wildlife Management Area (WMA) in Sussex County, Virginia. It comprises two tracts of land; the 2,208-acre (8.94 km^{2}) main tract, located immediately adjacent Big Woods State Forest, and the 1,965-acre (7.95 km^{2}) Parker's Branch tract, located nearby.

== History ==
The main tract of Big Woods WMA was established on land originally owned by International Paper, who had used the property for timber production. A 4,400-acre (18 km^{2}) parcel was purchased from International Paper in 2006 by The Nature Conservancy, who held the land in anticipation of eventual sale to the Commonwealth of Virginia. In 2010, the Virginia Department of Game and Inland Fisheries (VDGIF) and the Virginia Department of Forestry (VDOF) together purchased the parcel from The Nature Conservancy for $6.4 million; funding for the purchase was provided by a Virginia land conservation bond, the Virginia Land Conservation Fund, and grants from the U.S. Forest Service and U.S. Fish and Wildlife Service. The parcel was divided between the two agencies, with VDGIF establishing the WMA immediately adjacent to the 2,200-acre (8.9 km^{2}) Big Woods State Forest, managed by VDOF.

The Parker's Branch tract of the property was acquired by VDGIF in November 2016. As with the main tract, the land was purchased from The Nature Conservancy, who had again acquired the property for eventual sale to the state. The 1,965-acre (7.95 km^{2}) tract was purchased for $3.8 million using contributions from the U.S. Fish and Wildlife Service and the Virginia Land Conservation Foundation.

== Description ==
Big Woods WMA covers a total of 4,173 acres (16.89 km^{2}), split between the 2,208-acre (8.94 km^{2}) main tract and the 1,965-acre (7.95 km^{2}) Parker's Branch tract. The main tract is adjacent to Big Woods State Forest, and the two units are managed with similar goals. Both units are also contiguous with The Nature Conservancy's Piney Grove Preserve, a 3,200-acre (13 km^{2}) property dedicated to restoring longleaf pine forest for the benefit of the endangered red-cockaded woodpecker. Management of both the WMA and the state forest also aims to improve habitat for the red-cockaded woodpecker through planting of longleaf pine, the installation of nesting boxes, and prescribed burns.

The main tract is covered by pine forests; much of the Parker's Branch tract is covered by recently cut timber stands that will be replanted with longleaf pine. Game animals found on the WMA include bobwhite quail, white-tailed deer, eastern wild turkeys, pheasant, fox, and red squirrels.

=== Public use and access ===
Big Woods WMA is open to the public for hunting, trapping, fishing, hiking, and primitive camping. Access for persons 17 years of age or older requires a valid hunting or fishing permit, or a WMA access permit.

== See also ==
- List of Virginia Wildlife Management Areas
