= T. M. Gathright Wildlife Management Area =

Protected area of Virginia, United States

- IUCN category V (protected landscape/seascape)
- Location within Virginia Location within the United States
- Location: Bath County, Virginia
- Coordinates: 38°01′12″N 79°56′38″W
- Area: 13,428 acres (54.34 km^{2})
- Governing body: Virginia Department of Game and Inland Fisheries

T. M. Gathright Wildlife Management Area is a 13,428-acre (54.34 km^{2}) Wildlife Management Area (WMA) in Bath County, Virginia. The property's mountainous terrain includes elevations ranging from 1,400 to 3,600 feet (430 to 1,100 m) above sea level, and is divided by 2,530-acre (10.2 km^{2}) Lake Moomaw. The northwest boundary is marked at the crest of Allegheny Mountain, along the border between Virginia and West Virginia; additional mountains include Bolar Mountain to the west of the lake, and Coles Mountain to its east. A number of streams flow eastward from the summit, terminating at Mill Creek. The primary habitat is upland hardwood forest including mixed stands of oak and hickory, with tulip poplar in some of the more fertile areas. Small non-forested openings are also maintained for the benefit of wildlife.

T. M. Gathright WMA is owned and maintained by the Virginia Department of Game and Inland Fisheries. The area is open to the public for hunting, trapping, fishing, hiking, horseback riding, and primitive camping. A shooting range for sighting-in rifles is available. Access for persons 17 years of age or older requires a valid hunting or fishing permit, or a WMA access permit.

== See also ==
- List of Virginia Wildlife Management Areas
