= Big Woods State Forest =

State forest in Virginia, United States

- IUCN category VI (protected area with sustainable use of natural resources)
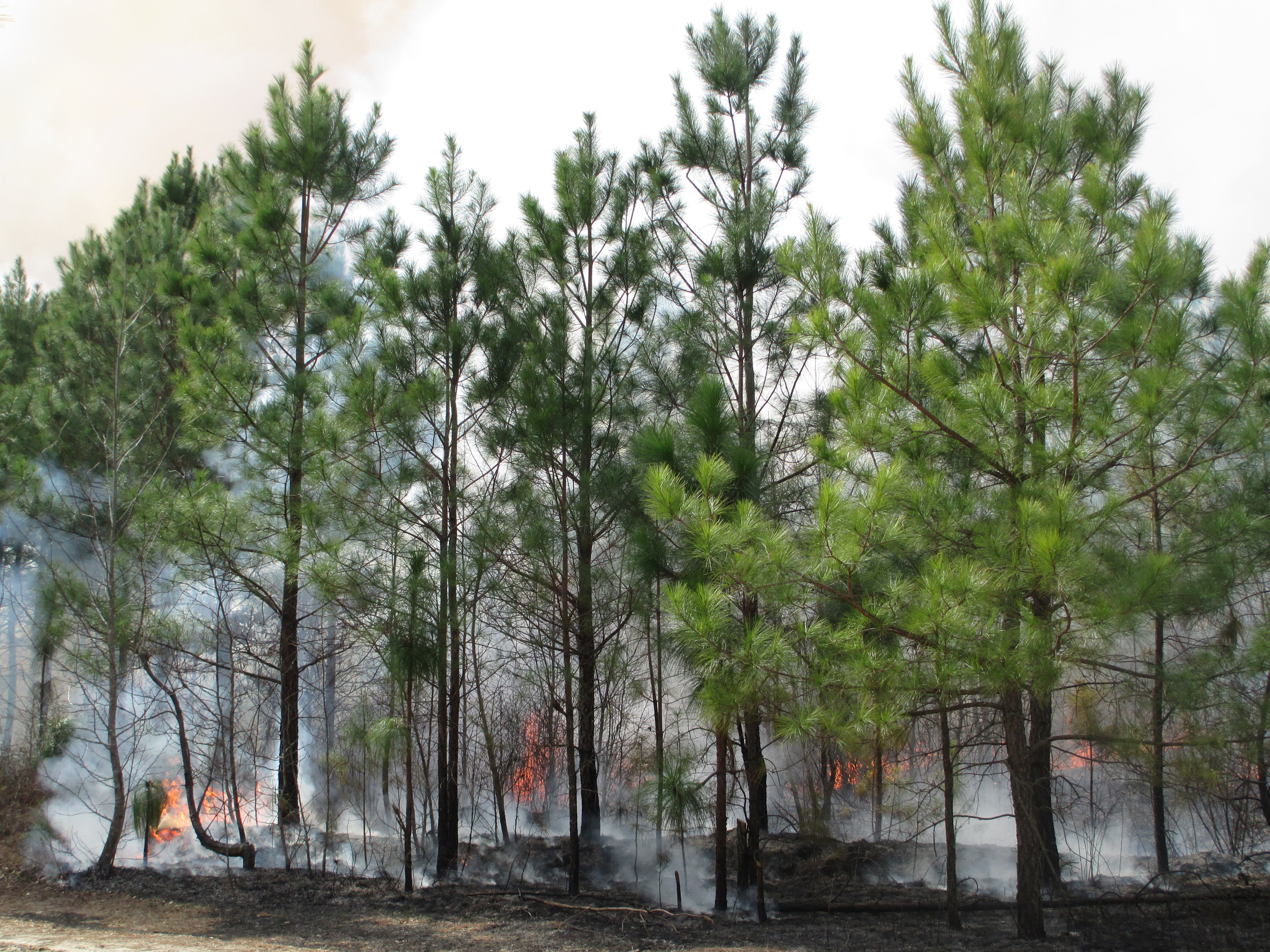
- Prescribed burn taking place within Big Woods State Forest's longleaf pine restoration area, February 2017. (Mature trees are loblolly pine serving as windbreak.)

- Location within Virginia
- Location: Sussex County, Virginia
- Coordinates: 36°56′17.0″N 77°04′52.4″W
- Area: 2,403 acres (9.72 km^{2})
- Established: 2010
- Governing body: Virginia Department of Forestry

Big Woods State Forest is a 2,403-acre (9.72 km^{2}) state forest in Sussex County, Virginia. It was the first state forest property to be established in southeast Virginia.

== History ==
The property, previously used for timber production by International Paper, was acquired by the Virginia Department of Forestry (VDOF) in 2010. It was part of a $6.4 million purchase of 4,400 acres (18 km^{2}) undertaken by VDOF and the Virginia Department of Game and Inland Fisheries (VDGIF); the remainder of the purchased property was used to create Big Woods Wildlife Management Area, located immediately adjacent Big Woods State Forest and managed by VDGIF.

== Description ==
Big Woods State Forest covers a landscape typified by pine savanna; it contains primarily loblolly pine from its days as a timber plantation, and newer plantings of longleaf pine. Wildlife on the property include deer, wild turkey, bobcat, fox, coyote, and rabbit.

The state forest borders both the Big Woods Wildlife Management Area and The Nature Conservancy's Piney Grove Preserve, a 3,200-acre (13 km^{2}) property dedicated to restoring longleaf pine forest for the benefit of the endangered red-cockaded woodpecker. Management of both the state forest and wildlife management area aims to promote the survival of the red-cockaded woodpecker through the planting of longleaf pine and the installation of nest boxes.

Hunting, fishing, horseback riding, and hiking is permitted within Big Woods State Forest; all activities except hiking require visitors to possess a valid State Forest Use Permit.

== See also ==
- List of Virginia state forests
- List of Virginia state parks
