= South River (Mattaponi River tributary) =

Coordinates: 38.03486°N 77.38720°W

Location
- Country: United States

Physical characteristics
- Source
  - location: Virginia

South River is a 16.9-mile-long (27.2 km) river in Caroline County in Virginia, United States. It is a tributary of the Mattaponi River.

Rising at the boundary between Caroline County and Spotsylvania County, the South River flows east, passing under U.S. Route 1 and Interstate 95, joining the Mattaponi north of Milford. Via the Mattaponi and York rivers, the South River is part of the Chesapeake Bay watershed.

== See also ==
- List of rivers of Virginia
