= Hardware River =

River in Virginia, United States

Coordinates: 37°44′21″N 78°24′10″W

The Hardware River is a 23.3-mile-long (37.5 km) tributary of the James River in central Virginia in the United States. It is part of the watershed of Chesapeake Bay.

The Hardware River is formed by the confluence of its short north and south forks in southern Albemarle County and flows generally southeastwardly into southwestern Fluvanna County, where it joins the James River about 7 miles (11 km) southeast of Scottsville.

== See also ==
- List of Virginia rivers
