= South River (Rapidan River tributary) =

Coordinates: 38.29013°N 78.35917°W

South River (Rapidan River)

Location
- Country: United States

Physical characteristics
- Source
  - location: Greene County, Virginia

The South River is a 13.7-mile-long (22.0 km) river in the U.S. state of Virginia. Rising northeast of Swift Run Gap in Shenandoah National Park, the river flows southeast to the Rapidan River near Burtonville. It is part of the Rappahannock River watershed. The whole river is within Greene County, Virginia.

== See also ==
- List of rivers of Virginia
