= Mattaponi River =

Tributary of the York river in eastern Virginia

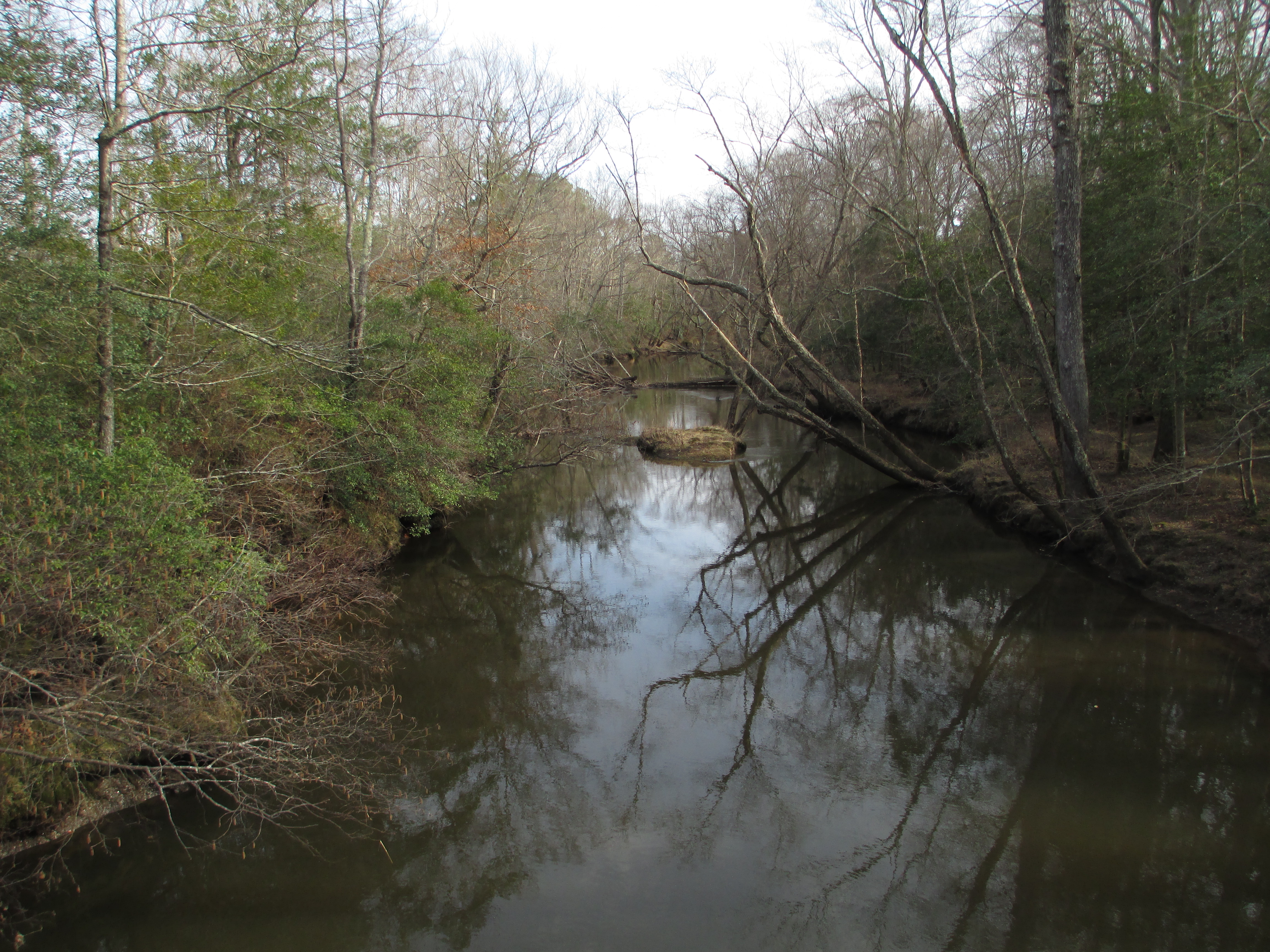
- The Mattaponi River, upstream of its confluence with the South River

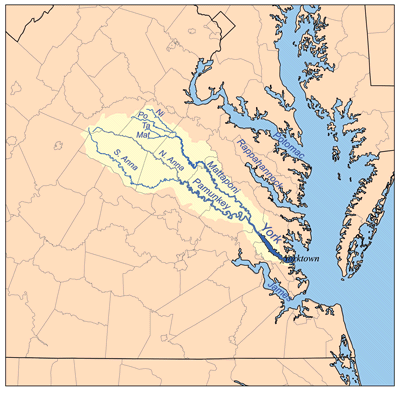
- York River watershed

Location
- Country: United States
- State: Virginia
- Counties: King and Queen, King William, New Kent, Caroline

Physical characteristics
- Source: Confluence of the Matta and Poni rivers
  - location: Near Woodford, Caroline County
  - coordinates: 38°06′45″N 77°26′08″W
- Mouth: York River
  - location: West Point, King William County
  - coordinates: 37°31′03″N 76°47′30″W
- Length: 103 mi (166 km)

Basin features
- Tributaries
  - left: Matta River, South River
  - right: Poni River

The Mattaponi River /ˈmætəpənaɪ/ is a 103-mile-long (166 km) tributary of the York River estuary in eastern Virginia in the United States.

== History ==
Historically, the Mattaponi River has been known by a variety of names and alternate spellings, including Mat-ta-pa-ment, Matapanient River, Matapany River, Matapeneugh River, Mattapanient River, Mattaponie River, Mattapony River, and Riviere de Mattapony. The current name and spelling of "Mattaponi" was set by official decisions of the United States Board on Geographic Names in 1897 and 1936.

Residents of the counties surrounding Mattaponi River have debated a proposed reservoir on the Mattaponi River, with environmental groups such as the Sierra Club, members of the Mattaponi Indian tribe, and residents of King William County opposing Newport News Waterworks in their efforts to build the King William Reservoir.

== Course ==
The Mattaponi River ultimately rises as four streams in Spotsylvania County, each of which is given a shorter piece of the Mattaponi's name:

- The Mat River and the Ta River join in Spotsylvania County to form the Matta River;
- The Po River and the Ni River join in Caroline County to form the Poni River;
- The Matta River and the Poni River join in Caroline County to form the Mattaponi River.

From the confluence of its tributaries, the Mattaponi flows generally southeast through Caroline County, where it collects the South River at the southern edge of the Mattaponi Wildlife Management Area; in its lower reaches it defines the boundary between King William and King and Queen counties. At West Point, it meets the Pamunkey River to form the York River.

== See also ==
- List of rivers of Virginia
