= Conway River (Virginia) =

Coordinates: 38°19′2″N 78°21′57″W

Location
- Country: United States

Physical characteristics
- Source
  - location: Virginia

The Conway River is a 14.4-mile-long (23.2 km) river in the U.S. state of Virginia. Rising near the triple junction of Madison, Greene and Page counties at the crest of Shenandoah National Park, the river flows south, then southeast to the Rapidan River northwest of Burtonville. The river is part of the Rappahannock River watershed.

== See also ==
- List of rivers of Virginia
- Fairfax Line
