= Virginia Department of Wildlife Resources =

State agency for wildlife conservation in Virginia, United States

Agency overview
- Formed: June 17, 1916; 109 years ago
- Jurisdiction: Executive branch of Virginia
- Headquarters: 7870 Villa Park Drive, Suite 400 (Villa Park 3), Henrico, VA 23228; 37.627337°N 77.466632°W
- Motto: Conserve. Connect. Protect.
- Annual budget: $74.5 Million USD (2025)
- Agency executives: Ryan Brown, Executive Director; Becky Gwynn, Executive Deputy Director; Darin Moore, Executive Deputy Director
- Parent department: Virginia Secretary of Natural Resources
- Parent agency: Virginia Board of Wildlife Resources
- Website: dwr.virginia.gov

The Virginia Department of Wildlife Resources (DWR) is a state agency of the Commonwealth of Virginia responsible for the management and conservation of wildlife and inland fish, as well as the regulation of hunting, fishing, and boating activities. It administers policies related to wildlife conservation, enforces game and fish laws, and promotes outdoor recreation and education.

== History ==
The Virginia Department of Game and Inland Fisheries was established on June 17, 1916, under the authority of the Commission of Fisheries, with M. D. "Mac" Hart appointed as secretary of the department. A statewide hunting license was introduced as a primary funding source, as the agency operated without financial support from the state treasury and remained self-sufficient.

Prior to the department's creation, from 1903 to 1916, localities individually administered game wardens. In 1920, the first Virginia State Game Far—spanning 1,200 acres—was established at Windsor Shades in New Kent County. In 1923, Mrs. B. M. Miller and Mrs. C. E. Sykes were among the first women recognized as game wardens in Virginia.

In 1926, the department was separated from the Commission of Fisheries and reorganized as the Commission of Game and Inland Fisheries, chaired by A. Willis Robertson. In 1928, the commission was granted sole authority to shorten hunting seasons, revoking the ability of local governments to set their own seasons.

In 1982, Virginia game wardens were granted full law enforcement authority. In 1987, the agency’s name reverted to the Department of Game and Inland Fisheries.

On July 1, 2020, the department was renamed the Virginia Department of Wildlife Resources.

== Conservation police officers ==
Conservation Police patch

The law enforcement officers of the Virginia Department of Wildlife Resources hold the title of conservation police officer. Conservation police officers enforce Virginia laws related to hunting, fishing, and boating. Their duties include patrolling by vehicle, aircraft, all-terrain vehicles (ATVs), boats, and on foot, as well as investigating tips and complaints from the public. Virginia conservation police officers are also appointed as deputy U.S. Fish and Wildlife Service special agents, granting them the authority to investigate suspected federal wildlife law violations, including those that cross state lines.

The first game wardens in Virginia were appointed in 1903, and the role was renamed to "conservation police officer" in 2007.

Since the department was founded, eleven officers have died in the line of duty. During the 1920s and 1930s, five game wardens were killed by gunfire, and two others died from drowning or pneumonia. Two more officers were fatally shot in 1952 and 1960. On December 19, 1972, two game wardens died in an aircraft accident while on duty.

== See also ==
- List of law enforcement agencies in Virginia
- Virginia Wildlife Management Areas
- List of state and territorial fish and wildlife management agencies in the United States
