= Dry Branch =

Dry Branch may refer to the following places in the United States:

- Dry Branch, Georgia, an unincorporated community
- Dry Branch, Virginia, an unincorporated community in Pulaski County, Virginia
- Dry Branch, West Virginia, an unincorporated community in Kanawha County, West Virginia
- Dry Branch (Cypress Creek), a stream in Missouri
- Dry Branch (Indian Creek), a stream in Missouri
- Dry Branch (Terre Bleue Creek), a stream in Missouri
- Dry Branch (Nebraska), a creek in Jefferson County, Nebraska
- Dry Branch (Stinking River tributary), a stream in Pittsylvania County, Virginia
- Dry Branch (Whitethorn Creek tributary, left), a stream in Pittsylvania County, Virginia
- Dry Branch (Whitethorn Creek tributary, right bank), a stream in Pittsylvania County, Virginia

== See also ==
- Dry Branch Fire Squad, an old-time bluegrass band founded in 1976
