= Stinking =

Stinking may refer to:

- Having an unpleasant odor
- Stinking Creek (disambiguation)
- Stinking Lake (New Mexico)
- Stinking Point, a cape in Maryland and Virginia
- Stinking River, a river in Virginia

== See also ==
- Stink (disambiguation)
- Stinky (disambiguation)
- Stinker (disambiguation)
