= Master of Bluegrass =

Studio album by Bill Monroe and his Blue Grass Boys
- Released: July 2, 1981
- Recorded: February 3–19, 1981
- Studio: The Music Mill (Nashville, Tennessee)
- Genre: Bluegrass; gospel
- Length: 29:24
- Label: MCA
- Producer: Walter Haynes

Bill Monroe and his Blue Grass Boys chronology
The Classic Bluegrass Recordings (1981)	Master of Bluegrass (1981)	Bill Monroe and Friends (1984)

Singles from Master of Bluegrass
- 1. "My Last Days on Earth" Released: June 12, 1981

Master of Bluegrass is the 14th studio album by American bluegrass musician Bill Monroe and his band, the Blue Grass Boys. Released by MCA Records on July 2, 1981, it features ten songs recorded over three sessions at The Music Mill in Nashville, Tennessee, on February 3, 4 and 19, 1981. Produced by Walter Haynes, the album features a number of guest musicians, including guitarist Norman Blake, mandolin player Jesse McReynolds and the Sheldon Kurland Strings.

== Background ==
By early 1981, Bill Monroe and his Blue Grass Boys had not recorded new material since 1978, and had not released an album since the live collection Bean Blossom '79. The band's lineup had remained stable throughout much of this period, with guitarist/vocalist Wayne Lewis, banjo player Joseph "Butch" Robins, and fiddler Kenny Baker joined by bassist Mark Hembree in June 1979. Despite not recording for a few years, Monroe wrote several new songs between album releases, which were collated to form the basis of a mandolin-focused instrumental album. Robins used a portable tape recorder on tour to record Monroe's ideas so he could learn them.

== Recording ==
The first recording session for Monroe's 14th studio album took place on February 3, 1981 and was Monroe's first at The Music Mill in Nashville, Tennessee, after Bradley's Barn burned down in 1980. Three tracks were recorded that day: first was "Old Ebenezer Scrooge", which Monroe had written after watching A Christmas Carol on TV in a motel; next was "Come Hither to Go Yonder", which was mistakenly listed on the album sleeve as "Go Hither to Go Yonder"; and last was "Right, Right On", which had been written a few years earlier. The band returned to the studio the next day, when they recorded three songs named after notable locations: "Lochwood", named after a park near Chatom, Alabama, which served as the site of the Dixie Bluegrass Festival; "Old Danger Field", named after Daingerfield, Texas, near where Monroe's girlfriend Julie LaBella's grandfather lived; and "Fair Play", named after Fair Play, South Carolina, not far from the site of several other bluegrass festivals.

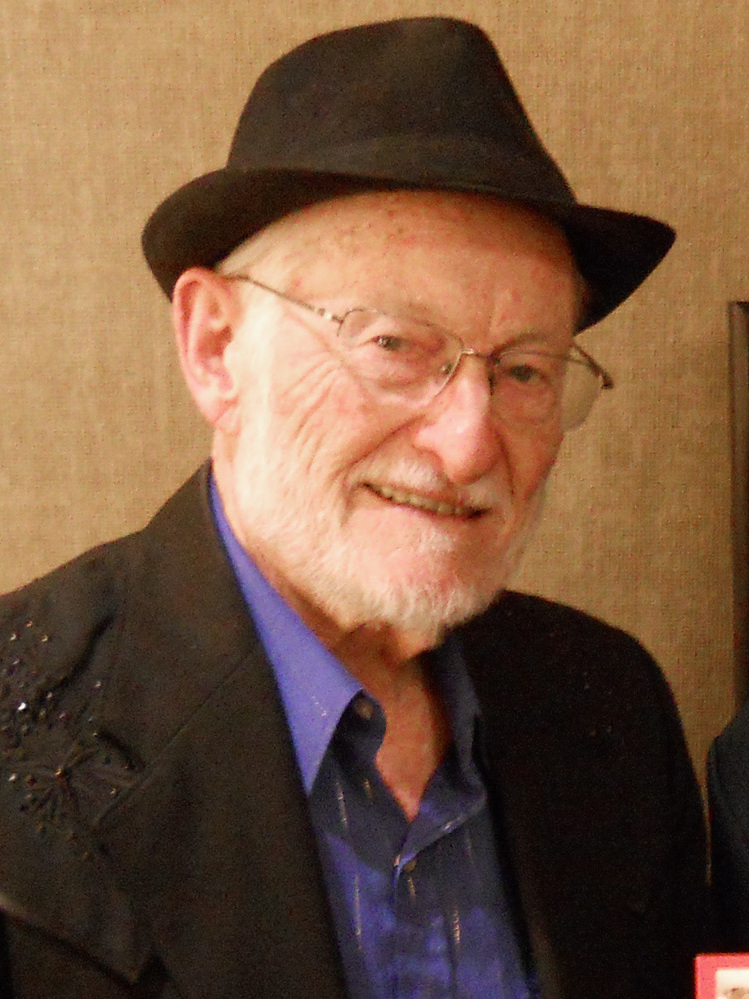
Jesse McReynolds performed on three tracks for Master of Bluegrass.

After a two-week break, the third and final session for Master of Bluegrass took place on February 19, 1981. In addition to Monroe and his Blue Grass Boys, the session featured guest musicians Norman Blake, Jesse McReynolds and Larry Sledge — the former on second guitar, the latter two creating a mandolin trio with Monroe. The full lineup performed on the recordings of "Melissa's Waltz for J.B." and "Lady of the Blue Ridge", before Monroe, Blake and Hembree recorded "My Last Days on Earth", which did not yet have a title. Monroe wrote the track "around two or three o'clock" in the morning during the winter of late-1976, as he recalled in an interview ten years later:

"I couldn't sleep, and it was as cold as it could be, boy. So I thought I'd get up and I'd get my mandolin and I'd just see what I could come up with [...] So I got my mandolin and I went to comin' up with tuning a different style, where it would harmonize — you could play two strings and one would be harmony for the other string, you see? So I got it tuned up the way that I wanted it, and then I went to playin' some on it, you know, seein' how the one sound would play along with the other sound [...] But it seemed like when I started on it, [it] just wrote itself, like it was there already. I was going along with it, and it was really sad."

The final song recorded on February 19, with the full band and guests, was a rendition of DeFord Bailey's "Evening Prayer Blues" — the only song on the album not written by Monroe. Two further sessions were scheduled for overdubbing on "My Last Day on Earth": on April 7, Bobby Hardin, Arlene Hardin, Curtis Young and Cindy Nelson recorded backing vocals for the song with Blake on guitar and Hembree on bass, and on April 28, the Sheldon Kurland Strings (violinists Carl Gorodetzky, George Binkley III, Conni L. Ellisor and Dennis W. Molchan, viola player Marvin D. Chantry, and cellist Roy Christensen) recorded their parts for the track. The song got its name around this time, when Monroe underwent an operation for colon cancer in early-March; he was able to assist with the album's mixing at the end of April, during the same session as the recording of the strings.

== Release ==
"My Last Days on Earth" was issued as a single on June 12, 1981, backed with "Come Hither to Go Yonder". During that year's Bean Blossom Festival, which started the same day, Monroe played the song from a tape recorder over a microphone on-stage for the audience, describing it as "the most powerful thing I've ever heard in my life". Master of Bluegrass was issued by MCA Records on July 2, 1981.

== Reception ==
Master of Bluegrass received positive reviews from critics. Cash Box magazine declared it "the quintessential Monroe album", claiming that "He and his mandolin never sounded better". In a review of the 1984 follow-up Bill Monroe and Friends for Country Music, Rich Kienzle called Master of Bluegrass "exquisite", while the publication's editor Russ Barnard described it as "like a lightning bolt ... the most bizarre, shocking, unexpected album of [Monroe's] career". Barnard later ranked the album the 14th best release of the last 15 years in 1987, then included it in his list of the "20 Best Albums" of the last 20 years in 1992.

== Track listing ==
All tracks are written by Bill Monroe, except "Evening Prayer Blues" by DeFord Bailey.

Master of Bluegrass track listing
No.	Title	Length
1.	"Old Ebenezer Scrooge" (recorded February 3, 1981)	2:58
2.	"Right, Right On" (recorded February 3, 1981)	2:15
3.	"Melissa's Waltz for J.B." (recorded February 19, 1981)	2:43
4.	"Fair Play" (recorded February 4, 1981)	2:25
5.	"Evening Prayer Blues" (recorded February 19, 1981)	3:15
6.	"Come Hither to Go Yonder" (recorded February 3, 1981)	2:49
7.	"Lochwood" (recorded February 4, 1981)	2:48
8.	"Lady of the Blue Ridge" (recorded February 19, 1981)	2:39
9.	"Old Danger Field" (recorded February 4, 1981)	2:58
10.	"My Last Days on Earth" (recorded February 19, 1981)	4:34
Total length:		29:24

== Personnel ==
Bill Monroe and his Blue Grass Boys

- Bill Monroe — mandolin
- Wayne Lewis — guitar (all except track 10)
- Joseph "Butch" Robins — banjo (all except track 10)
- Kenny Baker — fiddle (all except tracks 1 and 10)
- Mark Hembree — string bass

Guest musicians

- Norman Blake — guitar (tracks 3, 5, 8 and 10)
- Jesse McReynolds — mandolin (tracks 3, 5 and 8)
- Larry Sledge — mandolin (tracks 3, 5 and 8)
- Bobby Hardin — backing vocals (track 10)
- Arlene Hardin — backing vocals (track 10)
- Curtis Young — backing vocals (track 10)
- Cindy Nelson — backing vocals (track 10)
- Carl Gorodetzky — violin (track 10)
- George Binkley III — violin (track 10)
- Conni L. Ellisor — violin (track 10)
- Dennis W. Molchan — violin (track 10)
- Marvin D. Chantry — viola (track 10)
- Roy Christensen — cello (track 10)
- Bill McElhiney — string arrangements (track 10)

Production personnel

- Walter Haynes — production, mixing
- Joe Mills — engineering
- Vic Gabany — engineering

== Bibliography ==
- Ewing, Tom (September 7, 2018), Bill Monroe: The Life and Music of the Blue Grass Man (Music in American Life), Champaign, Illinois: University of Illinois Press, ISBN 978-0252041891
