= Stink Creek =

Stink Creek may refer to:

- Stink Creek (Nottely River tributary), a stream in Georgia
- Stink Creek (Grand River), a stream in North and South Dakota
- Stink Creek, polluted stream in Ashley County, Arkansas, featured in the 2016 documentary Company Town
- Stink Creek, a stream running through Center Township, Clark County, Kansas
- Stink Creek, a tributary to the North Fork Malheur River in Oregon

== See also ==
- Stinking Creek (disambiguation)
