= Kostiantynivka (disambiguation) =

Kostiantynivka is a city in Donetsk Oblast, Kramatorsk Raion, Ukraine.

Kostiantynivka (Ukrainian: Костянтинівка) may also refer to other inhabited localities in Ukraine:

- Kostiantynivka, Cherkasy Raion, Cherkasy Oblast
- Kostiantynivka, Krasnokutsk settlement hromada, Bohodukhiv Raion, Kharkiv Oblast
- Kostiantynivka, Kostiantynivka rural hromada, Kakhovka Raion, Kherson Oblast
- Kostiantynivka, Mykolaiv Oblast
- Kostiantynivka, Pokrovsk Raion, Donetsk Oblast
- Kostiantynivka, Sumy Oblast

== See also ==
- Konstantinovka (disambiguation)
- Constantinople (disambiguation)
- Kostiantynivka rural hromada (disambiguation)
- Kostiantynivka urban hromada
- Kostiantynivka Raion
