= Stink =

Stink most commonly refers to unpleasant odor.

The term may also refer to:

- Stink (EP), an EP by The Replacements
- Flatulence, sometimes called a stink
- Stink bomb, a device to create an unpleasant smell
- Stink bug, a type of insect
- Stink pipe, a slang term for part of a Drain-waste-vent system
- Stink!, a 2015 documentary film
- Stink, a character from the 1991 version of Land of the Lost

== See also ==
- Stinker (disambiguation)
- Stinking (disambiguation)
- Stinky (disambiguation)
