= North Fork Stinking River =

Stream in Virginia, USA

North Fork Stinking River Tributary to Stinking River
- Location of North Fork Stinking River mouth North Fork Stinking River (the United States)

Location
- Country: United States
- State: Virginia
- County: Pittsylvania

Physical characteristics
- Source: Reed Creek divide
  - location: about 0.5 miles southwest of Brutus, Virginia
  - coordinates: 37°00′22″N 079°16′53″W
  - elevation: 810 ft (250 m)
- Mouth
  - location: about 1.5 miles north of Greenfield, Virginia
  - coordinates: 36°57′08″N 079°16′29″W
  - elevation: 598 ft (182 m)
- Length: 4.03 mi (6.49 km)
- Basin size: 7.05 square miles (18.3 km^{2})
- Discharge
  - location: Stinking River
  - average: 9.22 cu ft/s (0.261 m^{3}/s) at mouth with Stinking River

Basin features
- Progression: Stinking River → Banister River → Dan River → Roanoke River → Albemarle Sound → Pamlico Sound → Atlantic Ocean
- River system: Roanoke River
- Tributaries
  - left: unnamed tributaries
  - right: unnamed tributaries
- Bridges: Scott Jacobs Memorial Drive, Deer View Road

North Fork Stinking River is a 4.03 mi (6.49 km) long 2nd order tributary to the Stinking River in Pittsylvania County, Virginia. This is the only stream of this name in the United States.

== Course ==
North Fork Stinking River rises about 0.5 miles southwest of Brutus, Virginia and then flows generally south to join the Stinking River about 1.5 miles north of Greenfield.

== Watershed ==
North Fork Stinking River drains 7.05 square miles (18.3 km^{2}) of area, receives about 45.5 in/year of precipitation, has a wetness index of 395.50, and is about 59% forested.

== See also ==
- List of Virginia Rivers
