= Long Branch (Whitethorn Creek tributary) =

Stream in Virginia, USA

Long Branch Tributary to Whitethorn Creek
- Location of Long Branch mouth Long Branch (Whitethorn Creek tributary) (the United States)

Location
- Country: United States
- State: Virginia
- County: Pittsylvania

Physical characteristics
- Source: Georges Creek divide
  - location: pond at Gretna, Virginia
  - coordinates: 36°56′30″N 079°21′50″W
  - elevation: 818 ft (249 m)
- Mouth
  - location: about 0.5 miles southeast of Gretna Rolling Mill, Virginia
  - coordinates: 36°53′43″N 079°19′59″W
  - elevation: 575 ft (175 m)
- Length: 4.33 mi (6.97 km)
- Basin size: 3.58 square miles (9.3 km^{2})
- Discharge
  - location: Whitethorn Creek
  - average: 4.89 cu ft/s (0.138 m^{3}/s) at mouth with Whitethorn Creek

Basin features
- Progression: Whitethorn Creek → Banister River → Dan River → Roanoke River → Albemarle Sound → Pamlico Sound → Atlantic Ocean
- River system: Roanoke River
- Tributaries
  - left: unnamed tributaries
  - right: unnamed tributaries
- Bridges: Player Road

Long Branch is a 4.33 mi (6.97 km) long 2nd order tributary to Whitethorn Creek in Pittsylvania County, Virginia.

== Course ==
Long Branch rises in a pond in Gretna, Virginia and then flows generally southeast to join Whitethorn Creek about 0.5 miles southeast of Gretna Rolling Mill.

== Watershed ==
Long Branch drains 3.58 square miles (9.3 km^{2}) of area, receives about 45.6 in/year of precipitation, has a wetness index of 410.64, and is about 49% forested.

== See also ==
- List of Virginia Rivers
