= Poplar Branch (Mill Creek tributary) =

Stream in Virginia, USA

Poplar Branch Tributary to Mill Creek
- Location of Poplar Branch mouth Poplar Branch (Mill Creek tributary) (the United States)

Location
- Country: United States
- State: Virginia
- County: Pittsylvania

Physical characteristics
- Source: Mill Creek divide
  - location: about 1.5 miles south-southwest of Gretna Rolling Mill, Virginia
  - coordinates: 36°52′52″N 079°21′47″W
  - elevation: 700 ft (210 m)
- Mouth
  - location: about 1.5 miles southeast of Gretna Rolling Mill, Virginia
  - coordinates: 36°52′49″N 079°20′00″W
  - elevation: 598 ft (182 m)
- Length: 0.85 mi (1.37 km)
- Basin size: 1.02 square miles (2.6 km^{2})
- Discharge
  - location: Mill Creek
  - average: 1.48 cu ft/s (0.042 m^{3}/s) at mouth with Mill Creek

Basin features
- Progression: Mill Creek → Whitethorn Creek → Banister River → Dan River → Roanoke River → Albemarle Sound → Pamlico Sound → Atlantic Ocean
- River system: Roanoke River
- Tributaries
  - left: unnamed tributaries
  - right: unnamed tributaries
- Bridges: none

Poplar Branch is a 0.85 mi (1.37 km) long 1st order tributary to Mill Creek in Pittsylvania County, Virginia.

== Course ==
Poplar Branch rises about 1.5 miles south-southwest of Gretna Rolling Mill, Virginia and then flows generally east to join Mill Creek about 1.5 miles southeast of Gretna Rolling Mill.

== Watershed ==
Poplar Branch drains 0.85 square miles (2.2 km^{2}) of area, receives about 45.6 in/year of precipitation, has a wetness index of 410.64, and is about 49% forested.

== See also ==
- List of Virginia Rivers
