= Mill Creek (Whitethorn Creek tributary) =

Stream in Virginia, USA

Mill Creek Tributary to Whitethorn Creek
- Location of Mill Creek mouth Mill Creek (Whitethorn Creek tributary) (the United States)

Location
- Country: United States
- State: Virginia
- County: Pittsylvania

Physical characteristics
- Source: Little Cherrystone Creek divide
  - location: about 2 miles south of Whittles, Virginia
  - coordinates: 36°51′35″N 079°23′42″W
  - elevation: 760 ft (230 m)
- Mouth
  - location: about 1 mile east of Coles Hill, Virginia
  - coordinates: 36°52′34″N 079°16′27″W
  - elevation: 515 ft (157 m)
- Length: 9.74 mi (15.68 km)
- Basin size: 11.02 square miles (28.5 km^{2})
- Discharge
  - location: Whitethorn Creek
  - average: 14.50 cu ft/s (0.411 m^{3}/s) at mouth with Whitethorn Creek

Basin features
- Progression: Whitethorn Creek → Banister River → Dan River → Roanoke River → Albemarle Sound → Pamlico Sound → Atlantic Ocean
- River system: Roanoke River
- Tributaries
  - left: Poplar Branch
  - right: unnamed tributaries
- Bridges: Strader Road, Payneton Road, Chalk Level Road, Coles Road

Mill Creek is a 9.74 mi (15.68 km) long 3rd order tributary to Whitethorn Creek in Pittsylvania County, Virginia.

== Course ==
Mill Creek rises about 2 miles south of Whittles, Virginia and then flows generally east to join Whitethorn Creek about 1 mile east of Coles Hill.

== Watershed ==
Mill Creek drains 11.02 square miles (28.5 km^{2}) of area, receives about 45.6 in/year of precipitation, has a wetness index of 426.60, and is about 50% forested.

== See also ==
- List of Virginia Rivers
