= West Fork Stinking River =

Stream in Virginia, USA

West Fork Stinking River Tributary to Stinking River
- Location of West Fork Stinking River mouth West Fork Stinking River (the United States)

Location
- Country: United States
- State: Virginia
- County: Pittsylvania

Physical characteristics
- Source: Sycamore Creek divide
  - location: about 3.5 miles southeast of Sycamore, Virginia
  - coordinates: 36°59′47″N 079°19′45″W
  - elevation: 875 ft (267 m)
- Mouth
  - location: about 1 mile northwest of Greenfield, Virginia
  - coordinates: 36°57′30″N 079°17′56″W
  - elevation: 625 ft (191 m)
- Length: 4.75 mi (7.64 km)
- Basin size: 3.67 square miles (9.5 km^{2})
- Discharge
  - location: Stinking River
  - average: 4.97 cu ft/s (0.141 m^{3}/s) at mouth with Stinking River

Basin features
- Progression: Stinking River → Banister River → Dan River → Roanoke River → Albemarle Sound → Pamlico Sound → Atlantic Ocean
- River system: Roanoke River
- Tributaries
  - left: unnamed tributaries
  - right: unnamed tributaries
- Bridges: Deer View Road, Tucker Road

West Fork Stinking River is a 4.75 mi (7.64 km) long 2nd order tributary to the Stinking River in Pittsylvania County, Virginia. This is the only stream of this name in the United States.

== Course ==
West Fork Stinking River rises about 3.5 miles southeast of Sycamore, Virginia and then flows generally southeast to join the Stinking River about 1 mile northwest of Greenfield.

== Watershed ==
West Fork Stinking River drains 3.67 square miles (9.5 km^{2}) of area, receives about 45.6 in/year of precipitation, has a wetness index of 413.18, and is about 43% forested.

== See also ==
- List of Virginia Rivers
