= Dry Branch (Stinking River tributary) =

Stream in Virginia, USA

Dry Branch Tributary to Stinking River
- Location of Dry Branch mouth Dry Branch (Stinking River tributary) (the United States)

Location
- Country: United States
- State: Virginia
- County: Pittsylvania

Physical characteristics
- Source: Maggotty Creek divide
  - location: about 2 miles southeast of Natal, Virginia
  - coordinates: 36°57′45″N 079°14′34″W
  - elevation: 690 ft (210 m)
- Mouth
  - location: about 1.5 miles southwest of Mt. Airy, Virginia
  - coordinates: 36°55′53″N 079°12′46″W
  - elevation: 513 ft (156 m)
- Length: 3.21 mi (5.17 km)
- Basin size: 2.68 square miles (6.9 km^{2})
- Discharge
  - location: Stinking River
  - average: 3.56 cu ft/s (0.101 m^{3}/s) at mouth with Stinking River

Basin features
- Progression: Stinking River → Banister River → Dan River → Roanoke River → Albemarle Sound → Pamlico Sound → Atlantic Ocean
- River system: Roanoke River
- Tributaries
  - left: unnamed tributaries
  - right: unnamed tributaries
- Bridges: Deer Track Farm Road, VA 40

Dry Branch is a 3.21 mi (5.17 km) long 3rd order tributary to the Stinking River in Pittsylvania County, Virginia.

== Course ==
Dry Branch rises about 2 miles southeast of Natal, Virginia and then flows southeast to join the Stinking River about 1.5 miles southwest of Mt. Airy.

== Watershed ==
Dry Branch drains 2.68 square miles (6.9 km^{2}) of area, receives about 45.2 in/year of precipitation, has a wetness index of 487.85, and is about 38% forested.

== See also ==
- List of Virginia Rivers
