= Sheva =

Sheva may refer to:

== Arts and entertainment ==
=== Characters ===
- Sheeva, a shokan female warrior of the Mortal Kombat franchise
- Sheva Alomar, a character in Resident Evil 5
- Sheva, the Benevolent, the title character in Richard Cumberland's play The Jew

=== Other arts and entertainment ===
- Arutz Sheva, an Israeli media network
- Sheva (band), an Israeli world music band founded in 2000
- Sheva's War, a 1998 graphic novel by Christopher Moeller
- SheVa tanks, immense artillery vehicles in the Legacy of the Aldenata series of books
- SHEVA virus from the book Darwin's Radio and Darwin's Children by Greg Bear

== People ==
- Bas Sheva (1925–1960), Jewish-American singer
- Marissa Sheva (born 1997), Irish-American footballer who plays for the Republic of Ireland
- Sheva Imut (born 2004), Indonesian soccer player
- Sheva Sanggasi (born 2004), Indonesian footballer
- A nickname for footballer Andriy Shevchenko

== Places ==
- Sheva, Virginia, United States
- Tel Be'er Sheva, an archeological site in southern Israel
- Tel Sheva, a Bedouin town in the Southern District of Israel

== Other uses ==
- Shva (◌ְ), a sign for a half-vowel or for the absence of vowel in the Hebrew alphabet
- The number 7, as pronounced in Hebrew; see Hebrew numerals

== See also ==
- Sheba (disambiguation)
