= Stinky Davis =

Stinky Davis may refer to one of the following:

- Harry Davis (1930s first baseman) (1908–1997), American baseball player
- Kenneth W. Davis, American oil entrepreneur in Texas and father of T. Cullen Davis
- Stinky Davis, a character in the Toonerville Folks newspaper cartoon
- Oswald "Stinky" Davis, a character in The Abbott and Costello Show
- Stinky Davis, a clown from a season 2 episode of Garfield and Friends.

== See also ==
- Stinky (disambiguation)
