= Dirty socks =

Dirty socks may refer to:

- Smelly socks
- Dirty Socks Spring, a spring in California
