= Dry Branch (Whitethorn Creek tributary, right bank) =

Stream in Virginia, USA

Dry Branch Tributary to Whitethorn Creek
- Location of Dry Branch mouth Dry Branch (Whitethorn Creek tributary, right bank) (the United States)

Location
- Country: United States
- State: Virginia
- County: Pittsylvania

Physical characteristics
- Source: Mill Creek divide
  - location: pond about 0.5 miles southeast of Sheva, Virginia
  - coordinates: 36°51′39″N 079°19′33″W
  - elevation: 650 ft (200 m)
- Mouth
  - location: about 1 mile southwest of Markham, Virginia
  - coordinates: 36°52′20″N 079°16′07″W
  - elevation: 502 ft (153 m)
- Length: 3.67 mi (5.91 km)
- Basin size: 2.45 square miles (6.3 km^{2})
- Discharge
  - location: Whitethorn Creek
  - average: 3.33 cu ft/s (0.094 m^{3}/s) at mouth with Whitethorn Creek

Basin features
- Progression: Whitethorn Creek → Banister River → Dan River → Roanoke River → Albemarle Sound → Pamlico Sound → Atlantic Ocean
- River system: Roanoke River
- Tributaries
  - left: unnamed tributaries
  - right: unnamed tributaries
- Bridges: S Meadows Road

Dry Branch is a 3.67 mi (5.91 km) long 2nd order tributary to Whitethorn Creek in Pittsylvania County, Virginia.

== Course ==
Dry Branch rises in a pond about 0.5 miles southeast of Sheva, Virginia and then flows generally northeast to join Whitethorn Creek about 1 mile southwest of Markham.

== Watershed ==
Dry Branch drains 2.45 square miles (6.3 km^{2}) of area, receives about 45.4 in/year of precipitation, has a wetness index of 545.50, and is about 36% forested.

== See also ==
- List of Virginia Rivers
