= Bean Blossom '79 =

Live album by Bill Monroe and his Blue Grass Boys
- Released: February 15, 1980
- Recorded: June 12 and 16, 1979
- Venue: Bean Blossom Festival (Beanblossom, Indiana)
- Genre: Bluegrass; gospel
- Length: 31:10
- Label: MCA
- Producer: Walter Haynes; Ron Chancey

Bill Monroe chronology
The Original Bluegrass Band (1978)	Bean Blossom '79 (1980)	The Classic Bluegrass Recordings (1981)

Bean Blossom '79 is the second live album by American bluegrass musician Bill Monroe and his band, the Blue Grass Boys, and the first not to feature other artists. Released by MCA Records on February 15, 1980, it features performances by Monroe and his band at the 1979 edition of the Bean Blossom Festival on June 12 and 16, 1979. One track on the album, "Little Cabin Home on the Hill", was re-recorded in the studio in the fall of 1979 and blended with crowd noises from the festival.

== Background ==
The popularity of the Bean Blossom Festival continued to increase throughout the 1970s, with expected attendances rising from 35,000 in 1972 to 50,000 by 1977. The 1979 edition of the nine-day festival took place between June 9 and 17, 1979 — just a month after the death of former Blue Grass Boys member Lester Flatt. Accordingly, Monroe paid tribute to his former bandmate onstage at the festival, playing the co-written "Little Cabin Home on the Hill" in his memory; the song was later re-recorded in the studio, however, and blended with crowd noise for inclusion on the album. Bean Blossom '79 marked the last recordings of bassist Randy Davis as a member of the Blue Grass Boys, as he left shortly after the festival. The album was released by MCA Records eight months after it was recorded, on February 15, 1980.

== Reception ==
Bean Blossom '79 received positive reviews from critics. Reviewing the album for Country Music magazine, Douglas B. Green called it "an affirmation of the unique musical vision which drove Bill Monroe through thick and thin, and the fire, drive and archaic beauty which sustains him and his music to this day". A review in Cash Box magazine praised the album's "fast pickin' and hot licks", highlighting "Little Cabin Home on the Hill", "The Little Girl and the Dreadful Snake" and the "Molly and Tenbrooks Medley".

== Track listing ==
Bean Blossom '79 track listing
No.	Title	Writer(s)	Length
1.	"John Henry"	Traditional	3:22
2.	"Dog House Blues"	Bill Monroe	3:22
3.	"The Old Mountaineer"	Monroe	2:51
4.	"Little Cabin Home on the Hill"	Monroe; Lester Flatt	3:12
5.	"Orange Blossom Special"	Ervin T. Rouse	2:30
6.	"Molly and Tenbrooks Medley"; I. "Little Maggie"; II. "Train 45"; III. "Blue Moon of Kentucky"	Monroe	4:34
7.	"Rocky Road Blues"	Monroe	2:32
8.	"The Little Girl and the Dreadful Snake"	Albert Price	4:20
9.	"In Despair"	Joe Ahr; Juanita Pennington	2:07
10.	"Y'all Come"	Arlie Duff	2:20
Total length:			31:10

== Personnel ==
Musicians

- Bill Monroe — mandolin, vocals (lead on tracks 1, 2, 5–7, 9 and 10; tenor on tracks 4, 8 and 9)
- Wayne Lewis — guitar, lead vocals (tracks 4, 8 and 9)
- Joseph "Butch" Robins — banjo
- Kenny Baker — fiddle
- Randy Davis — string bass

Additional personnel

- Walter Haynes — production
- Ron Chancey — co-production
- Johnny Rosen — engineering
- Mervin Louque — engineering
- Joe Mills — remix engineering
- Jim Loyd — mastering
- George Osaki — art direction
- David Hogan — design
- Slick Lawson — photography
