= Stinky =

Stinky generally refers to having a strong, negative odor.

Stinky may also refer to:

== People ==
- Stinky, female professional wrestler half of the tag-team Stinky and Sneaky from the Gorgeous Ladies of Wrestling
- Mr. Stinky, nickname of Raymond Edmunds, Australian convicted rapist and murderer
- Harry Davis (1908–1997), American professional baseball player

== Fictional characters ==
- Stinky (Foster's Home for Imaginary Friends), on the American animated television show Foster's Home for Imaginary Friends
- Stinky, portrayed by comedian Joe Besser on the syndicated television sitcom The Abbott and Costello Show
- Stinky, a character from the Moomins series of comics and cartoons
- Stinky, one of Casper the Friendly Ghost's uncles, who are better known as The Ghostly Trio
- Stinky Davis, a character in the Toonerville Folks newspaper cartoon
- Stinky Pete (Toy Story 2), in the film Toy Story 2
- Stinky Pete, a seal in the television series Sealab 2021
- Stinky Peterson (disambiguation), characters in various television shows
- Stinky Smurf, a character in the cartoon The Smurfs
- An alias of Pepé Le Pew
- Stinky, a stinkbug in the animated series Miss Spider's Sunny Patch Friends
- Stinky the Skunk, a skunk in the TV show "Jim Henson's Animal Show"

== Other uses ==
- Stinky, slang term used by cavers for a carbide lamp
- Stinky, Donetsk Oblast, a settlement in Ukraine
- Stinky Springs, Utah

== See also ==
- Stink (disambiguation)
- Stinker (disambiguation)
- Smelly (disambiguation)
