= The Classic Bluegrass Recordings =

Compilation album by Bill Monroe and his Blue Grass Boys
- Released: March 1981 (Vol. 1); May 1981 (Vol. 2)
- Recorded: 1945–1949
- Genre: Bluegrass; gospel
- Length: 35:02 (Vol. 1); 35:58 (Vol. 2)
- Label: County
- Producer: Art Satherley

Bill Monroe and his Blue Grass Boys chronology
Bean Blossom '79 (1980)	The Classic Bluegrass Recordings (1981)	Master of Bluegrass (1981)

Vol. 2 cover

The Classic Bluegrass Recordings, Vol. 1 and The Classic Bluegrass Recordings, Vol. 2 are a pair of compilation albums by American bluegrass musician Bill Monroe and his band, the Blue Grass Boys. Released by County Records in March and May 1981, the albums feature 12 songs each, all of which were recorded between 1945 and 1949 and released as singles or B-sides. Band members featured on the recordings include Lester Flatt, Earl Scruggs, Chubby Wise, Mac Wiseman and Rudy Lyle.

== Background ==
Columbia Records, owner of Bill Monroe's 1945–1949 recordings, authorised County Records to release two compilations of tracks from that period, many of which had not yet been featured on an album. The albums, The Classic Bluegrass Recordings, Vol. 1 and Vol. 2, were issued in March and May 1981, respectively.

The singles and B-sides previously not featured on an album are "How Will I Explain About You" and "Along About Daybreak" on Vol. 1, and "That Home Above", "Remember the Cross" and "Shine Hallelujah Shine" on Vol. 2. Two recordings had also previously only been available on library releases in 1976 — "Why Did You Wander?" on New World's Hills & Home: Thirty Years of Bluegrass, and "Come Back to Me in My Dreams" on the Library of Congress' Songs of Love, Courtship, & Marriage.

== Track listings ==
=== Vol. 1 ===
All tracks are written by Bill Monroe; track 12 co-written by Lester Flatt.

The Classic Bluegrass Recordings, Vol. 1 track listing
No.	Title	Original release	Length
1.	"True Life Blues" (recorded February 13, 1945)	single A-side (1946)	2:50
2.	"Travellin' This Lonesome Road" (recorded October 22, 1949)	"Can't You Hear Me Callin'" B-side (1950)	3:25
3.	"Kentucky Waltz" (recorded February 13, 1945)	"Rocky Road Blues" B-side (1945)	2:44
4.	"I'm Travelling On and On" (recorded October 28, 1947)	"Shine Hallelujah Shine" B-side (1948)	2:36
5.	"Blue Grass Special" (recorded February 13, 1945)	single A-side (1947)	2:26
6.	"Mother's Only Sleeping" (recorded September 16, 1946)	"Mansions for Me" B-side (1947)	3:16
7.	"Can't You Hear Me Calling" (recorded October 22, 1949)	single A-side (1950)	3:48
8.	"How Will I Explain About You?" (recorded September 17, 1946)	"Blue Grass Special" B-side (1947)	2:57
9.	"The Old Cross Road" (recorded October 27, 1947)	single A-side (1949)	2:42
10.	"Goodbye Old Pal" (recorded February 13, 1945)	"Blue Moon of Kentucky" B-side (1947)	2:25
11.	"Along About Daybreak" (recorded October 28, 1947)	"Heavy Traffic Ahead" B-side (1949)	3:08
12.	"Little Community Church" (recorded October 28, 1947)	"That Home Above" B-side (1948)	2:45
Total length:			35:02

=== Vol. 2 ===
All tracks are written by Bill Monroe, except where noted.

The Classic Bluegrass Recordings, Vol. 2 track listing
No.	Title	Writer(s)	Original release	Length
1.	"It's Mighty Dark to Travel" (recorded October 27, 1947)		"When You Are Lonely" B-side (1948)	2:52
2.	"I Hear a Sweet Voice Calling" (recorded October 27, 1947)		single A-side (1948)	2:58
3.	"That Home Above" (recorded October 28, 1947)		single A-side (1948)	3:50
4.	"Blue Moon of Kentucky" (recorded September 16, 1946)		single A-side (1947)	3:03
5.	"Blue Grass Stomp" (recorded October 22, 1949)		"The Girl in the Blue Velvet Band" B-side (1949)	3:00
6.	"Mansions for Me" (recorded September 16, 1946)		single A-side (1947)	3:16
7.	"Footprints in the Snow" (recorded February 13, 1945)	Rupert Jones	"True Life Blues" B-side (1946)	2:39
8.	"Why Did You Wander?" (recorded September 16, 1946)		Hills & Home: Thirty Years of Bluegrass (1976)	2:31
9.	"Come Back to Me in My Dreams" (recorded February 13, 1945)		Songs of Love, Courtship, & Marriage (1976)	3:00
10.	"Remember the Cross" (recorded October 28, 1947)	Monroe; Howard Watts	"The Old Cross Road" B-side (1949)	3:03
11.	"The Girl in the Blue Velvet Band" (recorded October 22, 1949)	Cliff Carlisle; Mel Foree	single A-side (1949)	3:12
12.	"Shine Hallelujah Shine" (recorded October 28, 1947)		single A-side (1948)	2:34
Total length:				35:58

== Personnel ==
Vol. 1 personnel

- Bill Monroe — mandolin, vocals (lead on tracks 3, 10 and 11; tenor on tracks 1, 2, 4, 6, 8, 9 and 12)
- Jimmy "Tex" Willis — guitar (tracks 1, 3, 5 and 10), lead vocals (track 1)
- Lester Flatt — guitar (tracks 6, 8, 9 and 11), lead vocals (tracks 4, 6, 8, 9 and 12)
- Malcolm "Mac" Wiseman — guitar and lead vocals (tracks 2 and 7)
- David "Stringbean" Akeman — banjo (tracks 1, 3, 5 and 10)
- Earl Scruggs — banjo (tracks 6, 8, 9 and 11), baritone vocals (tracks 4 and 12)
- Rudy Lyle — banjo (tracks 2 and 7)
- Robert "Chubby" Wise — fiddle (all except tracks 4 and 12), guitar (tracks 4 and 12)
- Howard "Cedric Rainwater" Watts — string bass (tracks 1, 3, 5, 6 and 8–11), bass vocals (tracks 4 and 12)
- Jack Thompson — string bass (tracks 2 and 7)
- Wilene "Sally Ann" Forrester — accordion (tracks 1, 3, 5 and 10)

Vol. 2 personnel

- Bill Monroe — mandolin, vocals (lead on tracks 2, 4, 7, 9 and 11; tenor on tracks 1–3, 6, 8, 10 and 12)
- Jimmy "Tex" Willis — guitar (tracks 7 and 9), lead vocals (track 9)
- Lester Flatt — guitar (tracks 1, 2, 4, 6 and 8), lead vocals (tracks 1–3, 6, 8, 10 and 12)
- Malcolm "Mac" Wiseman — guitar (tracks 5 and 11)
- David "Stringbean" Akeman — banjo (tracks 7 and 9)
- Earl Scruggs — banjo (tracks 1, 2, 4, 6 and 8), baritone vocals (tracks 3, 10 and 12)
- Rudy Lyle — banjo (tracks 5 and 11)
- Robert "Chubby" Wise — fiddle (all except tracks 3, 10 and 12), guitar (tracks 3, 10 and 12)
- Howard "Cedric Rainwater" Watts — string bass (tracks 1, 2, 4 and 6–9), bass vocals (tracks 2, 3, 10 and 12)
- Jack Thompson — string bass (tracks 5 and 11)
- Wilene "Sally Ann" Forrester — accordion (tracks 7 and 9), tenor vocals (track 9)

== Bibliography ==
- Ewing, Tom (September 7, 2018), Bill Monroe: The Life and Music of the Blue Grass Man (Music in American Life), Champaign, Illinois: University of Illinois Press, ISBN 978-0252041891
