= Flyblow Creek (Stinking River tributary) =

Stream in Virginia, USA

Flyblow Creek Tributary to Stinking River
- Location of Flyblow Creek mouth Flyblow Creek (Stinking River tributary) (the United States)

Location
- Country: United States
- State: Virginia
- County: Pittsylvania

Physical characteristics
- Source: Straightstone Creek divide
  - location: about 1 mile west of Renan, Virginia
  - coordinates: 36°58′03″N 079°14′16″W
  - elevation: 642 ft (196 m)
- Mouth
  - location: about 1 mile southwest of Mt. Airy, Virginia
  - coordinates: 36°55′54″N 079°12′36″W
  - elevation: 512 ft (156 m)
- Length: 4.24 mi (6.82 km)
- Basin size: 5.21 square miles (13.5 km^{2})
- Discharge
  - location: Stinking River
  - average: 6.35 cu ft/s (0.180 m^{3}/s) at mouth with Stinking River

Basin features
- Progression: Stinking River → Banister River → Dan River → Roanoke River → Albemarle Sound → Pamlico Sound → Atlantic Ocean
- River system: Roanoke River
- Tributaries
  - left: unnamed tributaries
  - right: unnamed tributaries
- Bridges: Farmers Road, Edmunds Road, VA 40

Flyblow Creek is a 4.24 mi (6.82 km) long 2nd order tributary to the Stinking River in Pittsylvania County, Virginia.

== Course ==
Flyblow Creek rises about 1 mile west of Renan, Virginia and then flows south-southeast to join the Stinking River about 1 mile southwest of Mt. Airy.

== Watershed ==
Flyblow Creek drains 5.22 square miles (13.5 km^{2}) of area, receives about 45.2 in/year of precipitation, has a wetness index of 444.52, and is about 50% forested.

== See also ==
- List of Virginia Rivers
