= Stinking River =

Stream in Virginia, USA

Stinking River Tributary to Banister River
- Location of Stinking River mouth Stinking River (the United States)

Location
- Country: United States
- State: Virginia
- County: Pittsylvania

Physical characteristics
- Source: Little Sycamore Creek divide
  - location: about 3 miles southeast of Sycamore, Virginia
  - coordinates: 36°59′59″N 079°19′21″W
  - elevation: 980 ft (300 m)
- Mouth
  - location: about 2.5 miles south of Mt. Airy, Virginia
  - coordinates: 36°54′26″N 079°11′35″W
  - elevation: 441 ft (134 m)
- Length: 14.18 mi (22.82 km)
- Basin size: 34.25 square miles (88.7 km^{2})
- Discharge
  - location: Banister River
  - average: 41.70 cu ft/s (1.181 m^{3}/s) at mouth with Banister River

Basin features
- Progression: Banister River → Dan River → Roanoke River → Albemarle Sound → Pamlico Sound → Atlantic Ocean
- River system: Roanoke River
- Tributaries
  - left: North Fork Stinking River; Maggotty Creek; Dry Branch; Flyblow Creek
  - right: West Fork Stinking River
- Bridges: Deer View Road, Tucker Road, Midway Road, Tucker Road, Telegraph Road, Tates Mill Road, VA 40, Hickeys Road, Johnson Mill Road

The Stinking River is a short tributary of the Banister River in southern Virginia in the United States. Via the Banister and Dan Rivers, it is part of the watershed of the Roanoke River, which flows to the Atlantic Ocean. The Stinking River flows for its entire length in Pittsylvania County.

== Course ==
Stinking River rises about 3 miles southeast of Sycamore, Virginia and then flows southeast to join the Banister River about 2.5 miles south of Mt. Airy.

== Watershed ==
Stinking River drains 34.25 square miles (88.7 km^{2}) of area, receives about 45.4 in/year of precipitation, has a wetness index of 422.79, and is about 53% forested.

== See also ==
- List of Virginia rivers
- Stinking Creek (disambiguation)
