= Maggotty Creek =

Stream in Virginia, USA

Maggotty Creek Tributary to Stinking River
- Location of Maggotty Creek mouth Maggotty Creek (the United States)

Location
- Country: United States
- State: Virginia
- County: Pittsylvania

Physical characteristics
- Source: North Fork Stinking River divide
  - location: Natal, Virginia
  - coordinates: 36°59′06″N 079°15′44″W
  - elevation: 742 ft (226 m)
- Mouth
  - location: about 1 mile northeast of Greenfield, Virginia
  - coordinates: 36°57′57″N 079°14′59″W
  - elevation: 565 ft (172 m)
- Length: 3.17 mi (5.10 km)
- Basin size: 2.62 square miles (6.8 km^{2})
- Discharge
  - location: Stinking River
  - average: 3.52 cu ft/s (0.100 m^{3}/s) at mouth with Stinking River

Basin features
- Progression: Stinking River → Banister River → Dan River → Roanoke River → Albemarle Sound → Pamlico Sound → Atlantic Ocean
- River system: Roanoke River
- Tributaries
  - left: unnamed tributaries
  - right: unnamed tributaries
- Bridges: none

Maggotty Creek is a 3.17 mi (5.10 km) long 3rd order tributary to the Stinking River in Pittsylvania County, Virginia. This is the only stream of this name in the United States.

== Course ==
Maggotty Creek rises in Natal, Virginia and then flows southeast and then turns southwest to join the Stinking River about 1 mile northeast of Greenfield.

== Watershed ==
Maggotty Creek drains 2.62 square miles (6.8 km^{2}) of area, receives about 45.3 in/year of precipitation, has a wetness index of 417.64, and is about 49% forested.

== See also ==
- List of Virginia Rivers
