= Bill Monroe Museum =

Museum dedicated entirely to the life and legacy of Bill Monroe

Coordinates: 37.44055°N 86.764226°W

The Bill Monroe Museum is a project of Ohio County and the Ohio County Tourism Commission. It is the only Museum dedicated entirely to the life and legacy of Bill Monroe and the early foundations of bluegrass music. The museum opened April 24, 2018 in Rosine, Kentucky.

The ground was broken on May 22, 2017, just across the street in Rosine from the Rosine Barn Jamboree in a field where Bill Monroe himself used to play baseball before performing for crowds. This was the result of two years' collaboration with local and state dignitaries to secure funding for the building. Currently, while construction is fully funded and construction is not in question, there is not enough funding to finish the build-out on the inside of the museum. Jody Flener, Executive Director of Ohio County Tourism, said, "without additional funding, we won't be able to open to the public. A shell and memorabilia doesn't quite make a museum."

== See also ==
- List of music museums
- Bill Monroe Farm
- Bill Monroe Memorial Festival
- International Bluegrass Music Museum
