= Stink Creek (Grand River tributary) =

Stream in North and South Dakota, U.S.

Coordinates: 45°45′58″N 101°06′21″W

Stink Creek is a stream in the U.S. states of North Dakota and South Dakota.

Stink Creek was named for the naturally occurring unpleasant odor originating at a bog at its source.

== See also ==
- List of rivers of North Dakota
- List of rivers of South Dakota
- Stinking Creek (disambiguation)
