= Dry Branch (Whitethorn Creek tributary, left bank) =

Stream in Virginia, USA

Dry Branch Tributary to Whitethorn Creek
- Location of Dry Branch mouth Dry Branch (Whitethorn Creek tributary, left bank) (the United States)

Location
- Country: United States
- State: Virginia
- County: Pittsylvania

Physical characteristics
- Source: Georges Creek divide
  - location: Chalk Level, Virginia
  - coordinates: 36°55′26″N 079°16′17″W
  - elevation: 650 ft (200 m)
- Mouth
  - location: about 0.5 miles southwest of Markham, Virginia
  - coordinates: 36°52′33″N 079°15′04″W
  - elevation: 480 ft (150 m)
- Length: 3.79 mi (6.10 km)
- Basin size: 6.07 square miles (15.7 km^{2})
- Discharge
  - location: Whitethorn Creek
  - average: 7.82 cu ft/s (0.221 m^{3}/s) at mouth with Whitethorn Creek

Basin features
- Progression: Whitethorn Creek → Banister River → Dan River → Roanoke River → Albemarle Sound → Pamlico Sound → Atlantic Ocean
- River system: Roanoke River
- Tributaries
  - left: unnamed tributaries
  - right: unnamed tributaries
- Bridges: none

Dry Branch is a 3.79 mi (6.10 km) long 2nd order tributary to Whitethorn Creek in Pittsylvania County, Virginia.

== Course ==
Dry Branch rises at Chalk Level, Virginia and then flows south-southeast to join Whitethorn Creek about 0.5 miles southwest of Markham.

== Watershed ==
Dry Branch drains 6.07 square miles (15.7 km^{2}) of area, receives about 45.3 in/year of precipitation, has a wetness index of 522.22, and is about 51% forested.

== See also ==
- List of Virginia Rivers
