= Viroliubivka =

Viroliubivka Віролюбівка
- Village
- Interactive map of Viroliubivka
- Location of Virolyubivka within Ukraine Viroliubivka (Donetsk Oblast)
- Coordinates: 48°36′40″N 37°43′00″E
- Country: Ukraine
- Oblast: Donetsk Oblast
- Raion: Kramatorsk Raion
- Hromada: Kostiantynivka urban hromada
- Founded: 1862
- Elevation: 154 m (505 ft)

Population (2001 census)
  - Total: 585
- Time zone: UTC+2 (EET)
  - Summer (DST): UTC+3 (EEST)
- Postal code: 85131
- Area code: +380 6272
- KATOTTH: UA14120070040058286

Viroliubivka (Ukrainian: Віролюбівка; Russian: Веролюбовка) is a village in Kostiantynivka urban hromada, Kramatorsk Raion, Donetsk Oblast, eastern Ukraine. It is located 66.33 kilometres (41.22 mi) north by west (NbW) from the centre of Donetsk city.

== History ==
It was founded in 1862 under the Russian Empire.

=== Russian invasion of Ukraine ===
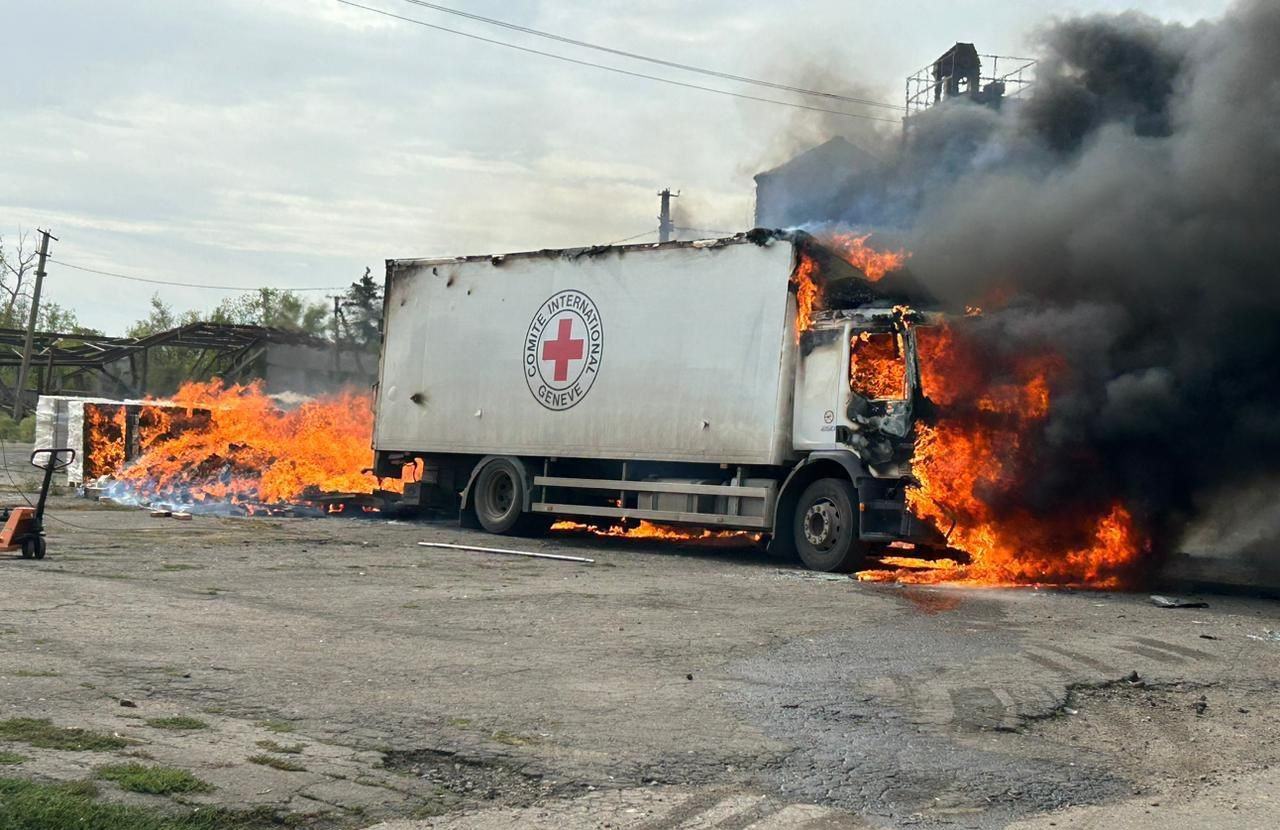
Attacked truck of the ICRC, 12 September 2024

On 12 September 2024, during the full-scale Russian invasion of Ukraine, three Red Cross (ICRC) workers were killed by Russian shelling. On June 21, 2025, four civilians were evacuated from the village.

== Demographics ==
As of the 2001 Ukrainian census, the settlement had 585 inhabitants, whose native languages were 68.21% Ukrainian and 31.45% Russian.
