= International Bluegrass Music Museum =

Museum in Owensboro, Kentucky, US

Bluegrass Music Hall of Fame & Museum
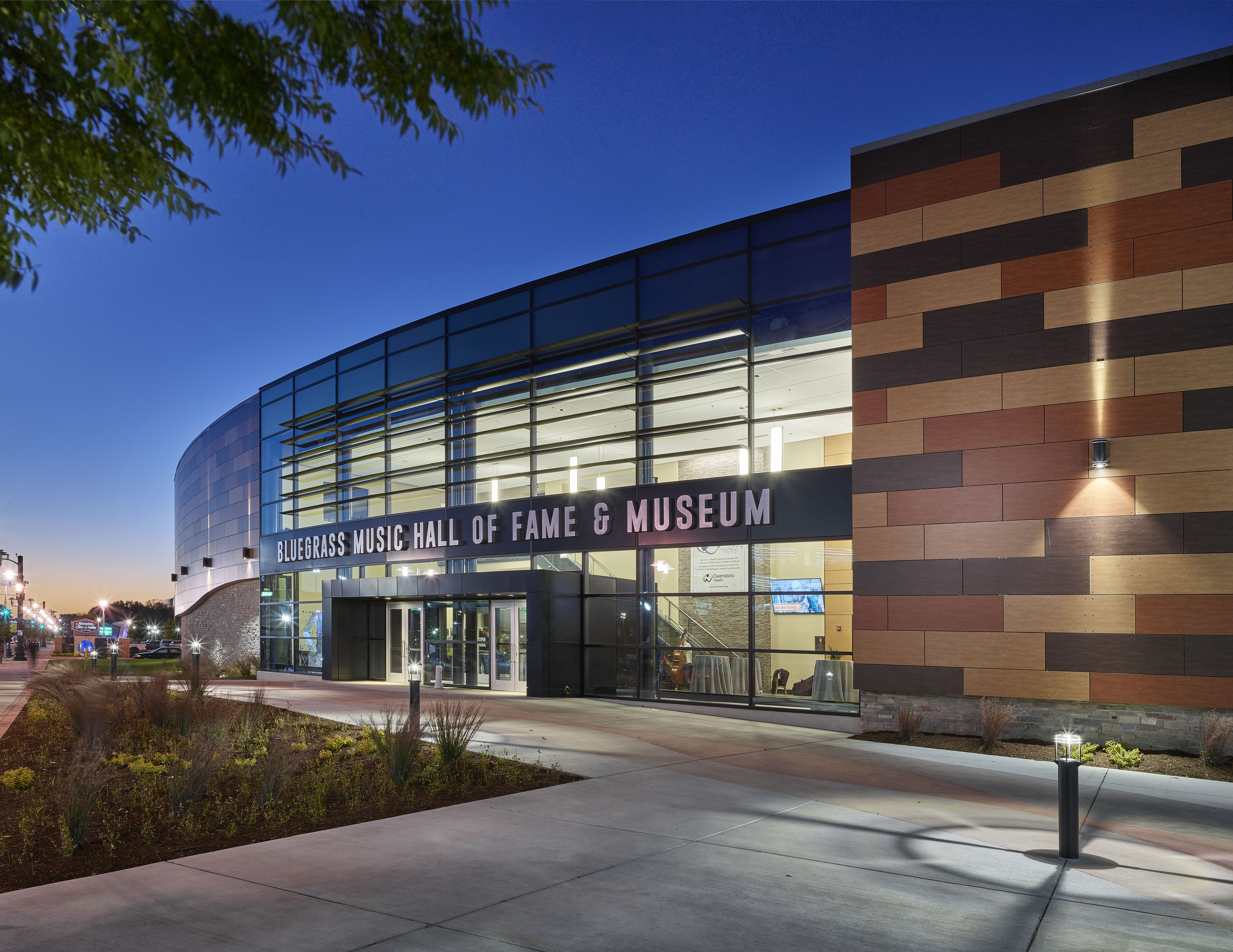
- Exterior of the Bluegrass Music Hall of Fame & Museum, Owensboro, KY.
- Established: 1991
- Location: Owensboro, Kentucky, United States
- Coordinates: 37.7753°N 87.1098°W
- Website: bluegrasshall.org

The Bluegrass Music Hall of Fame & Museum is a bluegrass music museum in Owensboro, Kentucky, United States. The museum has interactive exhibits, posters, costumes, live instrument demonstrations, and International Bluegrass Music Association's Hall of Fame. The museum has 64,000 square feet of exhibits, offices, and venues on three floors. As a non-profit group, the Bluegrass Music Hall of Fame & Museum has raised funds with the help of famous bluegrass musicians such as Ricky Skaggs and Ralph Stanley.

They host their own annual summer music festival, ROMP. ROMP festival is typically held the last weekend in June each summer. Jam sessions are held at the museum every Saturday and Sunday from 1:30 to 4:30 pm. The Bluegrass Music Museum & Hall of Fame is the world's only facility dedicated to the history and preservation of the international history of bluegrass music.

== Mission ==
The mission of the Bluegrass Music Hall of Fame & Museum is to gather, preserve, exhibit and disseminate artifacts, history, collections and performance art of the global history of bluegrass music through an educational experience.

== Vision ==
The vision of the Bluegrass Music Hall of Fame & Museum is to be the world center for the presentation of the history, culture, and future of bluegrass music.

== History ==
The museum was incorporated in 1991 and opened year-round in 1995. In 2002 it re-opened after expanding. In 2018, the Bluegrass Music Hall of Fame & Museum opened a new $15 million facility in downtown Owensboro, Kentucky on the banks of the Ohio River.

== Programs ==
- Woodward Theatre – Concerts are hosted in this 447-seat theatre, designed specifically for acoustic music.
- The Kentucky Bluegrass AllStars are a group of music students who take lessons at the museum.
- The Video Oral History Project (VOHP) – videotapes the elderly first generation of bluegrass musicians.
- Bluegrass in the Schools (BITS) – puts instruments into the hands of students and teachers in elementary schools in Daviess County, Kentucky.
- Concerts – The museum hosts concerts in both its indoor theatre and outdoor stage area.
- Independence Bank Event Room is over 4,000 square feet with a 990 square foot balcony. The space can accommodate approximately 250-300 guests.

== See also ==
- Bill Monroe Museum
- Bluegrass music
- Country music
