= Kostiantynivka rural hromada =

Kostiantynivka rural hromada (Ukrainian: Костянтинівська сільська громада) is the name of several hromadas in Ukraine:

- Kostiantynivka rural hromada, Zaporizhzhia Oblast
- Kostiantynivka rural hromada, Mykolaiv Oblast
- Kostiantynivka rural hromada, Kherson Oblast

== See also ==
- Kostiantynivka urban hromada
