= Bill Monroe Memorial Festival =

The Bean Blossom Festival, later the Bill Monroe Memorial Festival, was an early bluegrass music festival held annually in Beanblossom, Indiana. The Bean Blossom festival was known for its jam sessions including well-known bluegrass musicians.

== History ==
The Bean Blossom Festival was founded in 1966 by Bill Monroe, who is considered by many to be the originator of the bluegrass genre.

In 1973, an album of live music, titled Bean Blossom, was recorded at the festival. By 1974, about 20,000 people were attending the festival each year.

Many well-known bluegrass musicians and bands have performed at the festival, including the Dry Branch Fire Squad in 1979.

By 1985, the Bean Blossom Festival was the biggest bluegrass festival in the United States.

The festival hosts the induction ceremonies for Bill Monroe's Bluegrass Hall of Fame.

== See also ==
- Bill Monroe Farm
- Bill Monroe Museum
