= Stink Creek (Nottely River tributary) =

Stream in Georgia, U.S.

Coordinates: 34°47′38.33″N 83°53′22.66″W

Stink Creek is a stream in the U.S. state of Georgia. It is a tributary to the Nottely River.

Stink Creek's name comes from the Cherokee Indians of the area, on account of its naturally occurring foul odor.
