= Kostiantynivka urban hromada =

Kostiantynivka urban hromada Костянтинівська міська громада
- Hromada
- Interactive map of Kostiantynivka urban hromada
- Country: Ukraine
- Oblast: Donetsk
- Raion: Kramatorsk

Area
  - Total: 467.4 km^{2} (180.5 sq mi)

Population (2025)
  - Total: 5,200
  - Density: 11/km^{2} (29/sq mi)
- Settlements: 24
- Cities: 1
- Rural settlements: 5
- Villages: 18

Kostiantynivka urban hromada (Ukrainian: Костянтинівська міська громада) is a hromada of Ukraine, located in Kramatorsk Raion, Donetsk Oblast. Its administrative center is the city Kostiantynivka.

It has an area of 467.4 square kilometres (180.5 mi^{2}) and a population of 73,979, as of 2020.

== Demographics ==
=== population ===
- 73,979 (2020)
- 5,200 (2025)

== Settlements ==
The hromada contains 24 settlements: 1 city (Kostiantynivka), 18 villages:

- Bila Hora
- Bilokuzminivka
- Viroliubivka
- Diliivka
- Ivanopillia
- Izhevka
- Klynove
- Maiske
- Markove
- Mykolaivka
- Nelipivka
- Novomarkove
- Oleksandro-Shultyne
- Podilske
- Popasne
- Predtechine
- Stupochki
- Fedorivka

And 5 rural-type settlements: Bezymyane, Molocharka, Novodmytrivka, Stinky and Chervone.

== See also ==
- List of hromadas of Ukraine
