= Pickerel, Virginia =

Unincorporated community in Virginia, US

Coordinates: 36°58′36″N 79°24′41″W

Pickerel is an unincorporated community in Pittsylvania County, in the U.S. state of Virginia.
