= Stinking Hot Springs =

Geothermal site in Utah

- Stinky Springs; Old Indian Hot Springs; Golden Youth Mineral Springs; Sulphur Springs
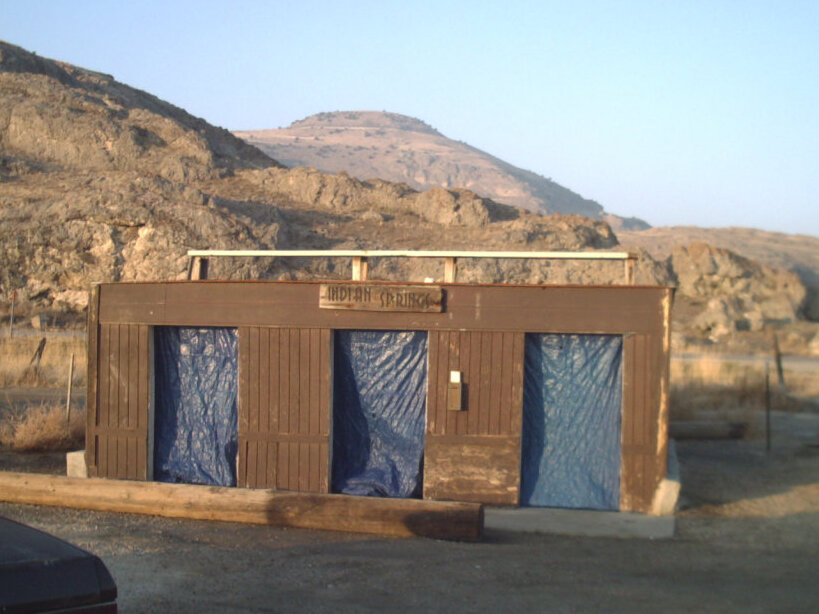
- Stinking Hot Springs bathhouse, Utah (2002)
- Interactive map of Stinking Hot Springs
- Location: Near Corinne, Utah, and west of Brigham City
- Coordinates: 41.577°N 112.233°W
- Elevation: 4,255 feet (1,297 m)
- Type: Thermal
- Discharge: 5–45 US gallons per minute (19–170 L/min)
- Temperature: 113–124 °F (45–51 °C)

Stinking Hot Springs are geothermally heated natural springs located in Box Elder County, Utah, United States. The springs are located about 6 miles (9.7 km) southwest of Bear River City, near Utah State Route 83 northwest of Corinne. Locally known as Stinky Springs, the site is one of four hot springs located along the Wasatch Range near the eastern border of the county. The source of the "stink" is pungent hydrogen sulfide gas that emerges with the water.

== History ==
The springs were reportedly "discovered" in 1868. After settlement the Stinky Springs were first owned by Corinne pioneer Hiram House. According to a 1941 history of Corinne, Utah, Hiram's son W. F. House inherited the springs land and attempted to capitalize on the water resource: "He owned much of the land in and around the town at one time and most of the small mountain, called 'Little Mountain' located about six miles west, with the railroad running around its southern tip. Here his boundless energy located and partly developed a gold mine...Hot mineral springs ran from under the mountain, and he conceived the idea of boiling the water down and bottling the mineral deposit which he distributed and sold until his death as 'Golden Youth', which probably had more merit than many of the remedies on the market at the present time. Chemists found the water of the springs contained more epsom salts than any springs in the region. Development of the springs as a health resort was one dream of the late Mr. House, which may yet be realized." According to the 1945 American Guide to Utah, "At 6.9 m [on U.S. Route 15] is the junction with State 83. Left on this improved dirt road (difficult in winter) to SULPHUR SPRINGS, 6.7 m (duck hunting), flowing from the base of Little Mountain, and forming a series of pools. In late autumn, mallards fly north over the scalding springs in great flocks."

The water from this spring flows through an under-highway culvert before arriving at three pools within a "partly vandalized cement-block bathhouse". According to one account, H. House supposedly donated the springs to the county when he died "with the stipulation that no one would ever be charged to use the healing sulfurous waters. Box Elder County officials agreed, in turn, to maintain the spring and its buildings, and keep the place clean. A subsequent owner of land around the spring moved the bathing building across the highway. Over the years Box Elder County forgot its part of the agreement and the building was allowed to disintegrate". The facilities were described in 1965 as "improvised," and according to a guide to hot springs of southwestern North America published in 1992, "No one knows why this block house was built, or how it survives, but it continues to provide free soaks". According to an Associated Press report of 2000, "The current bathhouse has been on the site for about six months. Ferry said various bathhouses have been constructed and vandalized over the years without the landowner's permission." The springs were closed for several months in 2000 after a man died at the site. After his cause of death was determined to be drowning rather than carbon dioxide poisoning, the springs were reopened on a "use at your own risk" basis.

The now-unroofed building was a covered for a time with a tarp or tent. The 1999 history of Box Elder suggests that the site was considered a fearsome place at that time, with a great deal of uncollected litter, and stated that "many people dare not go there any more. More's the pity, for waters of Stinky Springs are said to contain healing power, especially for those suffering from arthritic conditions. Many local old-timers testify of the curative powers of the waters".

== Water profile ==
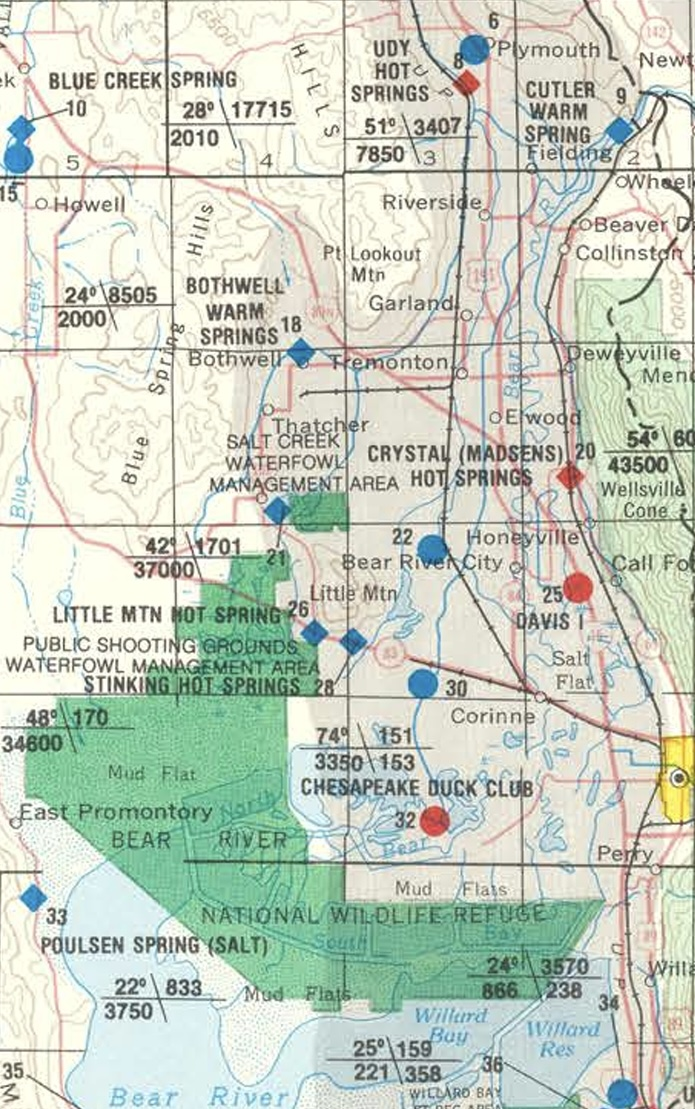
Hot and warm springs in vicinity of Bear River National Wildlife Refuge (NOAA, 1980)

The water temperature at the spring vent varies between 113–124 °F (45–51 °C) and the estimated flow rate ranges from 5–45 US gallons per minute (19–170 L/min) According to a 1970 report by a U.S. government geologist, the water emerges from the base of Little Mountain from a limestone formation created during the Mississippian period. The source of the hot water is likely a gap in a concealed fault.

Stinking Hot Springs water is quite mineralized with high levels of sodium chloride, lithium, bromide, and iodide. The saltiness and high levels of dissolved solids in the water are partly due to the "subsurface material through which the water moves" along the "north margin of the saline marshes and mudflats" of Utah's Great Salt Lake.

In addition to the high levels of sulphur dioxide gas, the Stinky Springs release high amounts of carbon dioxide, levels that were considered as a possible reason for a man's death at the springs in 2000. Stinking Springs, and nearby Belmont Springs and Crystal Springs, all have relatively high levels of radium, indicating a geologically significant deposit of uranium exists somewhere in the strata below. The radium levels are not believed to be a human health hazard under normal hot-spring bathing conditions.

== See also ==
- List of hot springs in the United States § Utah
- Dirty Socks Hot Spring (California)
