= Dry Branch Fire Squad =

American bluegrass band

The Dry Branch Fire Squad is an American traditional-style bluegrass band from Virginia, which was fronted by Ron Thomason. The band was known for its showy performances and for Thomason's humorous interludes. The Dry Branch Fire Squad was the host band of Grey Fox Bluegrass Festival, formerly called the Winterhawk Bluegrass Festival. The band also hosted the High Mountain Hay Fever festival in Colorado as a fundraiser for a local medical clinic.

== History ==
Dry Branch Fire Squad was founded by Thomason, a former member of the Clinch Mountain Boys, in October 1976. It was named for a small town in Southwest Virginia where Thomason was born. The band has gone through many lineup changes; Thomason has been the one constant, serving as the band's MC, lead singer, and mandolin player. He also plays banjo and guitar on occasion, and during performances often demonstrates hambone technique which he learned as a child.

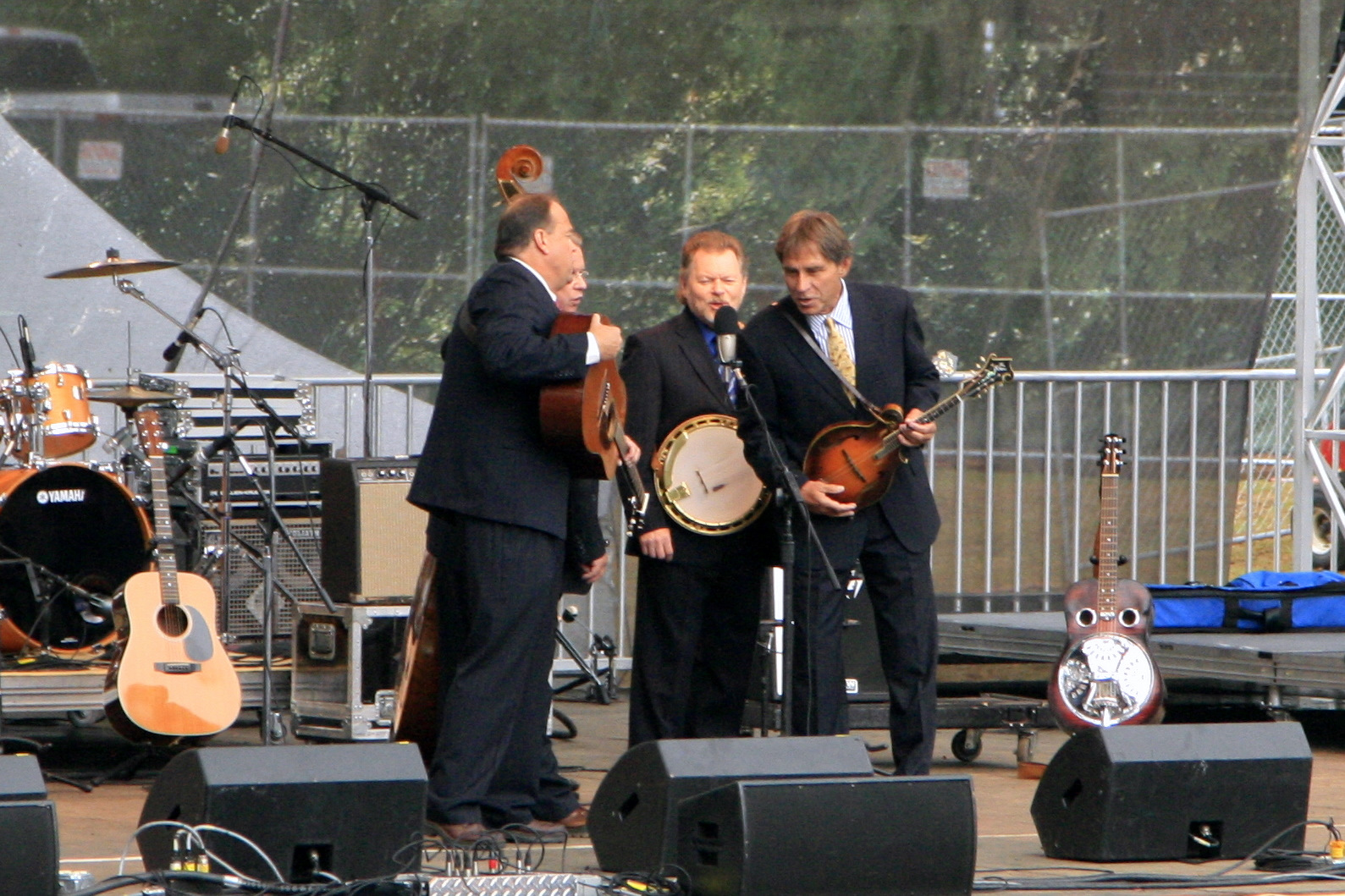
Dry Branch Fire Squad performing at Hardly Strictly Bluegrass

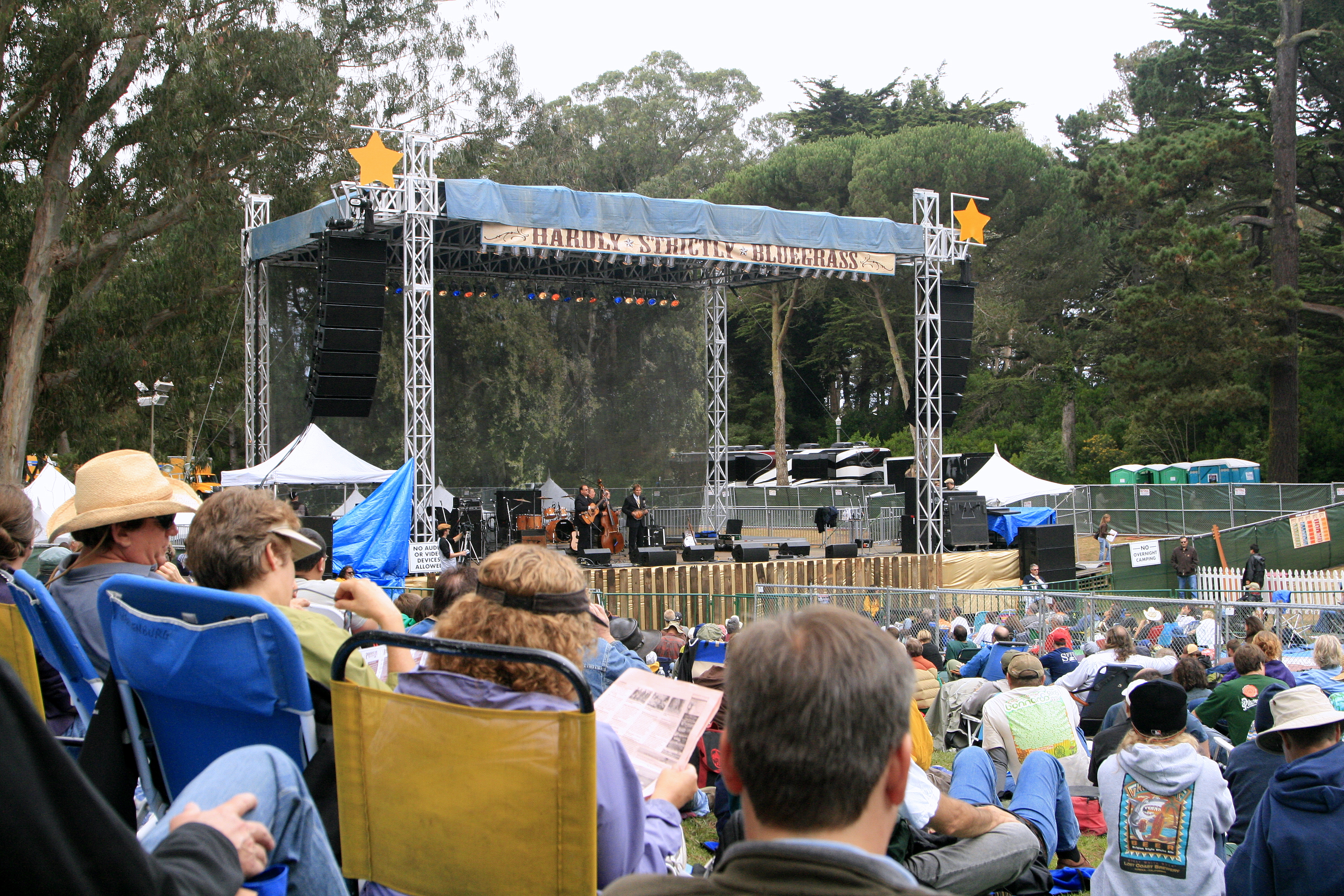
Dry Branch Fire Squad at Golden Gate Park Hardly Strictly Bluegrass

In 1978 the band released a self-titled debut album, and in 1979 they performed at Bill Monroe's Bean Blossom Festival.

In 1981 the Dry Branch Fire Squad signed with Rounder Records, and released the first of many recordings with that label.

In 1984 the band began hosting the newly organized Winterhawk Bluegrass Festival.

At one time banjoist Bill Evans and singer Suzanne Thomas performed and recorded with the band.

The band has performed at the annual Hardly Strictly Bluegrass festival at Golden Gate Park in San Francisco every year since 2003.

Long-time members Brian Aldridge and Dan Russell retired at the end of 2015. Former member, Adam McIntosh, rejoined the band playing guitar and mandolin and assuming tenor singing duties. Jeff Byrd also joined replacing Dan Russell on bass.

In 2016 band is composed of Adam McIntosh (guitar, mandolin), Tom Boyd (banjo, resophonic guitar), Jeff Byrd (bass), and Ron Thomason (mandolin, banjo, guitar).

In 2017 a performance by the band was filmed for inclusion in the film Bluegrass Court Jester.

The Dry Branch Fire Squad was a regular at the Gettysburg Bluegrass Festival, and has been the opening act for the Sunday morning gospel set for every single year, twice per summer, since the festival began, totaling 40 years and 80 festivals. After a break for COVID year, Dry Branch Fire Squad is slated to resume their record for the 81st festival in May 2021.

== Selected recordings ==
- The Dry Branch Fire Squad - 1978
- On Tour - Live at the Gettysburg Bluegrass Festival - 1979
- Born to Be Lonesome - 1981
- Antiques and Inventions - 1981
- Fannin' the Flames - 1982
- Good Neighbors and Friends - 1985
- Golgotha - 1986
- Tried and True - 1987
- Fertile Ground - 1989
- Long Journey - 1991
- Just for the Record - 1993
- Live! at Last - 1996
- Memories That Bless and Burn - 1999
- Hand-Hewn - 2001
- Live at the Newburyport Firehouse - 2005
- Thirtieth Anniversary Special - 2007
- Echoes of the Mountains - 2009
- The Gospel Way - 2014
- Don't Forget This Song - 2014
