= Chalk Level, Virginia =

Unincorporated community in Virginia, US

Coordinates: 36°55′07″N 79°16′40″W

Chalk Level is an unincorporated community in Pittsylvania County, in the U.S. state of Virginia.
