= Brutus, Virginia =

Unincorporated community in Virginia, US

Coordinates: 37°00′40″N 79°16′09″W

Brutus is an unincorporated community in Pittsylvania County, in the U.S. state of Virginia.

The community is located in the northeastern part of the county, approximately nine miles north/north-east of Gretna. It is surrounded with farmland, timber and single family homes. Brutus is approximately 850 feet above sea level.
