= Whitethorn Creek (Banister River tributary) =

Stream in Virginia, USA

Whitethorn Creek Tributary to Banister River
- Location of Whitethorn Creek mouth Whitethorn Creek (Banister River tributary) (the United States)

Location
- Country: United States
- State: Virginia
- County: Pittsylvania

Physical characteristics
- Source: Frying Pan Creek divide
  - location: about 0.5 miles south-southeast of Pickerel, Virginia
  - coordinates: 36°57′58″N 079°24′22″W
  - elevation: 1,000 ft (300 m)
- Mouth
  - location: Markham, Virginia
  - coordinates: 36°52′26″N 079°14′33″W
  - elevation: 479 ft (146 m)
- Length: 15.01 mi (24.16 km)
- Basin size: 65.54 square miles (169.7 km^{2})
- Discharge
  - location: Banister River
  - average: 78.43 cu ft/s (2.221 m^{3}/s) at mouth with Banister River

Basin features
- Progression: Banister River → Dan River → Roanoke River → Albemarle Sound → Pamlico Sound → Atlantic Ocean
- River system: Roanoke River
- Tributaries
  - left: Long Branch; Georges Creek; Dry Branch
  - right: Mill Creek; Dry Branch
- Bridges: VA 40, Terry Road, US 29, Coles Road, S Meadows Road

Whitethorn Creek is a 15.01 mi (24.16 km) long 4th order tributary to the Banister River in Pittsylvania County, Virginia. The Whitehorn Creek watershed and its tributary, Mill Creek, are the location of one of the largest uranium deposits in the United States on Cole Hill.

== Variant names ==
According to the Geographic Names Information System, it has also been known historically as:

- Whitehorn Creek

== Course ==
Whitethorn Creek rises about 0.5 miles south-southeast of Pickerel, Virginia and then flows southeast to join the Banister River at Markham.

== Watershed ==
Whitethorn Creek drains 65.54 square miles (169.7 km^{2}) of area, receives about 45.5 in/year of precipitation, has a wetness index of 432.34, and is about 46% forested.

== See also ==
- List of Virginia Rivers
