= Stinking Point =

Coordinates: 38.1279°N 76.6033°W

Stinking Point is a cape in the U.S. states of Maryland and Virginia.

Stinking Point was named after the bodies of the Civil War dead washing up there.
