= Dry Branch (Indian Creek tributary) =

Stream in the American state of Missouri

Coordinates: 38.1939386°N 90.9823602°W

Dry Branch is a stream in Washington County in the U.S. state of Missouri. It is a tributary of Indian Creek.

Dry Branch was named for the fact it often runs dry.

== See also ==
- List of rivers of Missouri
