= Stinky Peterson =

Stinky Peterson may refer to:

- A character from Hey Arnold!
- A character from The Red Green Show
- A character from Recess
