= Bill Monroe Farm =

- Monroe, Bill, Farm
- U.S. National Register of Historic Places
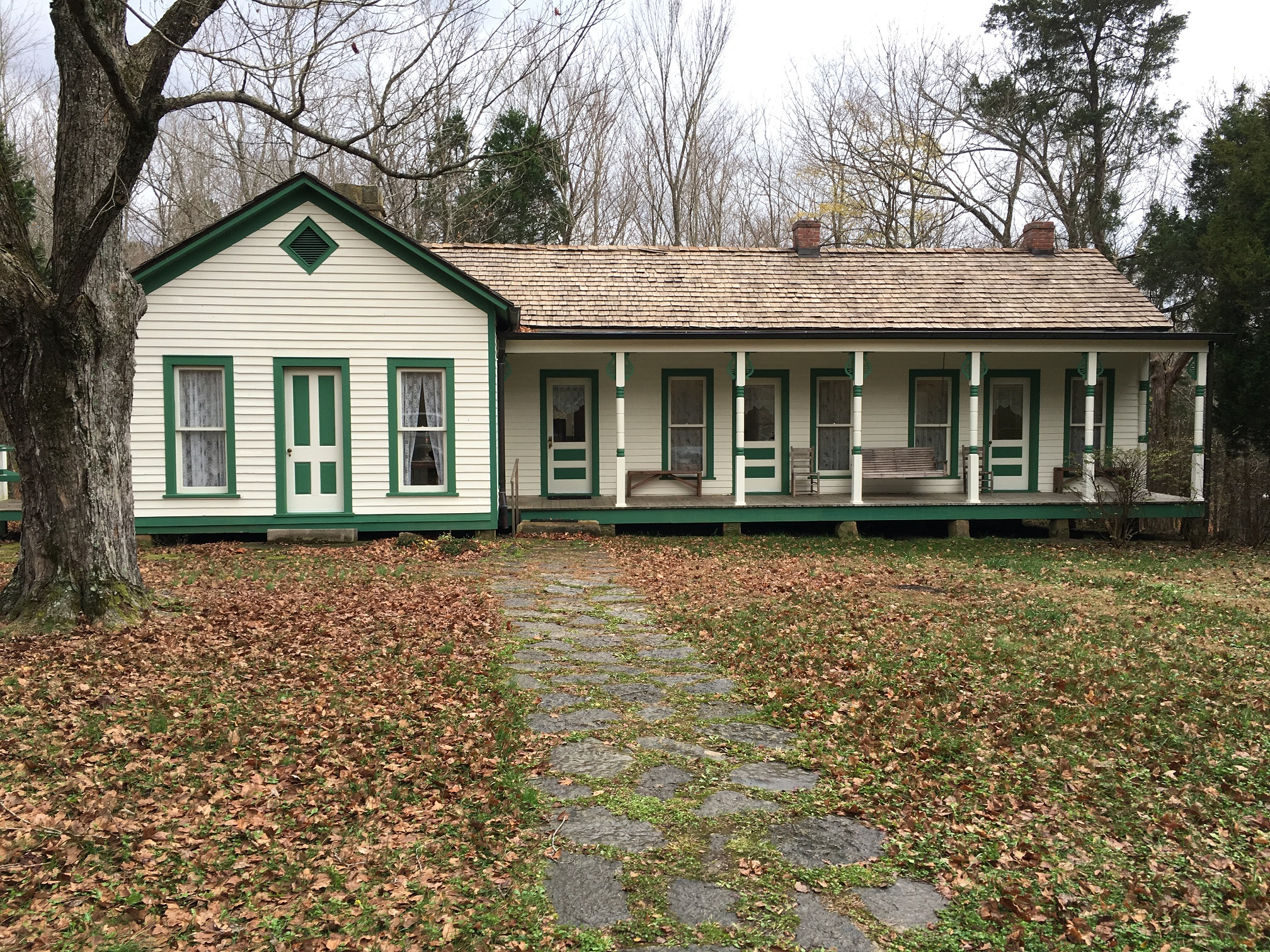
- Bill Monroe Homeplace

- Location within Kentucky Location within the United States
- Nearest city: Rosine, Kentucky
- Coordinates: 37°25′58″N 86°45′53″W
- Area: 1,000 acres (4.0 km^{2})
- Built: 1920
- Built by: James Buchanan Monroe
- NRHP reference No.: 03000648
- Added to NRHP: July 18, 2003

The Bill Monroe Farm is a historic farm attributed to being the birthplace of Bill Monroe, creator of the bluegrass music genre. The farm is 1,000 acres (4.0 km^{2}) and is located near Rosine in Ohio County, Kentucky. It was listed on the National Register of Historic Places in 2003.

== Location ==
The property is in Rosine in Ohio County, Kentucky, and is about 2 miles to the west of where U.S. Route 62 and Kentucky Route 1544 meet.

== Buildings ==
The main house, the Bill Monroe Homeplace is a 1,000 square feet (93 m^{2}) building built in 1920. It was built on the site of a saddlebag log cabin which burned in 1916, which was the birthplace of Bill Monroe and many of his siblings. The 1920 building incorporated the original chimney and hearth of the log cabin.

The Charlie Monroe House was originally built in 1945 or 1946 and was regarded as non-contributing in the National Register listing. It is described by Paul McCoy as being built by Charlie Monroe using wooden clapboards and Permastone. The house includes a garage, two porches, and three brick chimneys.

Along with the Charlie Monroe House, there were two festival stages and a sorghum mill on the property which were considered non-contributing.

=== Restoration ===
During the years after Monroe's passing, vandals took pieces of wood from the main house as souvenirs, adding to the disrepair already caused by weathering. The homeplace was restored in 2001 by the Bill Monroe Foundation with assistance of restoration expert Vie Hood from Tennessee, "whose restoration credits include the Tennessee State Capitol Building, Davy Crockett's home, and the Hermitage the home of Andrew Jackson."

== See also ==
- Bill Monroe Museum
- National Register of Historic Places listings in Ohio County, Kentucky
