= Georges Creek (Whitethorn Creek tributary) =

Stream in Virginia, USA

Georges Creek Tributary to Whitethorn Creek
- Location of Georges Creek mouth Georges Creek (Whitethorn Creek tributary) (the United States)

Location
- Country: United States
- State: Virginia
- County: Pittsylvania

Physical characteristics
- Source: Old Womans Creek divide
  - location: pond about 1 mile southwest of Gretna, Virginia
  - coordinates: 36°50′10″N 079°23′47″W
  - elevation: 950 ft (290 m)
- Mouth
  - location: about 0.75 miles southwest of Markham, Virginia
  - coordinates: 36°52′39″N 079°15′17″W
  - elevation: 480 ft (150 m)
- Length: 13.28 mi (21.37 km)
- Basin size: 17.36 square miles (45.0 km^{2})
- Discharge
  - location: Whitethorn Creek
  - average: 20.95 cu ft/s (0.593 m^{3}/s) at mouth with Whitethorn Creek

Basin features
- Progression: Whitethorn Creek → Banister River → Dan River → Roanoke River → Albemarle Sound → Pamlico Sound → Atlantic Ocean
- River system: Roanoke River
- Tributaries
  - left: unnamed tributaries
  - right: unnamed tributaries
- Bridges: US 29, Music Street N, US 29 Business, Ben Annie Road, VA 40, Chalk Level Road, Markham Road

Georges Creek is a 13.28 mi (21.37 km) long 3rd order tributary to Whitethorn Creek in Pittsylvania County, Virginia. Georges Creek is the source of water for the Town of Gretna, Virginia.

== Course ==
Georges Creek rises in a pond about 1 mile southwest of Gretna, Virginia and then flows southeast to join Whitethorn Creek about 0.75 miles southwest of Markham.

== Watershed ==
Georges Creek drains 17.36 square miles (45.0 km^{2}) of area, receives about 45.5 in/year of precipitation, has a wetness index of 413.02, and is about 48% forested.

== See also ==
- List of Virginia Rivers
