= Whittles, Virginia =

Unincorporated community in Virginia, US

Coordinates: 36°53′12″N 79°23′16″W

Whittles is an unincorporated community in Pittsylvania County, in the U.S. state of Virginia.
