= Dirty Socks Hot Spring =

Water source in California

- Dirty Sock Hot Spring, Dirty Sox Hot Spring
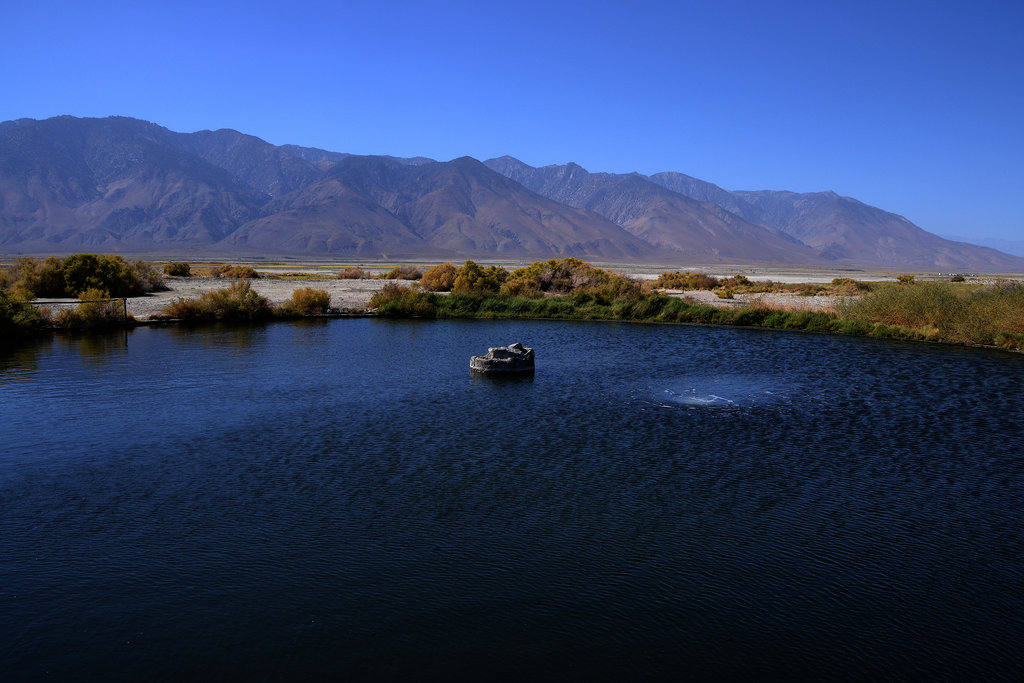
- Interactive map of Dirty Socks Hot Spring
- Location: Outside of Olancha, Inyo County, California
- Coordinates: 36.330°N 117.948°W
- Temperature: 93

Dirty Socks Hot Spring (also known as Dirty Sock or Dirty Sox) is a formerly developed hot spring near Death Valley, Inyo County, California, in the United States. The spring is located near the south edge of Owens Lake, several miles from the small town of Olancha.

A sulfur spring, the naturally occurring unpleasant odor may have been compared to smelly socks. The water is also often discolored with algae growth. Another explanation is that the spring was named from the fact miners washed their dirty socks there.

== History ==
A well was drilled at the site in 1917 and hit hot water at 12,000 feet (3,700 m). A cement swimming pool and other amenities were built in 1927, but the attempt at establishing a resort failed. The pool is about 30 feet by 30 feet in size. All the buildings were gone by 1945, with one source suggesting they were burned by vandals.

The June 1958 issue of California AAA's Westways contained a short article on Dirty Sock. The April 1960 issue of Desert Magazine featured a two-page article on the spring titled "Dirty Sock: A 'For Free' Spa on the Mojave Desert" complete with photographs. The piece was written by former Inyo resident Marguerite Jenkins.

In 1964, the California Division of Mines and Geology journal Mining Information Service wrote about Dirty Sock.

In 1965, the Inyo County local government took over Dirty Socks, but management of the remote area proved challenging. The Inyo County Board of Supervisors unanimously terminated their lease agreement for Dirty Socks on October 17, 1978.

== Name variations ==
There are a several variations on the hot springs' name in regular usage, including Dirty Sock (singular) or Dirty Sox. In a 1964 newspaper editorial, Eastern California Museum director and area historian Dorothy Cragen strongly asserted that the original and correct spelling of the name was the singular "Dirty Sock". Cragen's claim is further backed up by the local columns of Inyo County newspapers, which regularly mentioned residents swimming at "Dirty Sock" as early as 1930. However, the spelling "Dirty Sox" appeared as early as 1932, and "Dirty Socks" as early as 1936.

The 2018 FalconGuides book Touring California and Nevada Hot Springs by Matt C. Bischoff refers to the spring by the name Dirty Sock.

== Water profile ==
According to NOAA, the water temperature is 93 °F (34 °C). The well flow rate is 380 liters per minute.

== Access ==
According to a guide to hot springs published in 1992, "There are many acres of unmarked level space on which overnight parking is not prohibited. It is five miles to the nearest restaurant, motel, service station, and store...There are no signs on the highway." The spring is 300 yards (270 m) northwest of California State Route 190. Dirty Socks is accessible year-round.

== See also ==
- List of hot springs in the United States § California
- Owens Lake
- Stinking Hot Springs (Utah)
