= Sheva, Virginia =

Unincorporated community in Virginia, US

Coordinates: 36°51′58″N 79°20′05″W

Sheva is an unincorporated community in Pittsylvania County, in the U.S. state of Virginia.
