= Country Music (magazine) =

- Founder: John Killion, Russell D. Barnard, Spencer Oettinger
- First issue: 1972; 54 years ago
- Final issue: August 2003; 22 years ago

Country Music was a bi-monthly magazine on country music founded in New York City in 1972 by John Killion, Russell D. Barnard and Spencer Oettinger as a monthly publication. It was known for taking an approach to music journalism closer in tone to Rolling Stone with an insistence on high-caliber writing and knowledgability, unlike earlier country fan publications that opted to uncritically publicize artists and their work. The magazine became known for informed, sometimes critical articles and opinionated reviews and also for its advocacy for the early 1970s "Outlaw" movement and its coverage of traditional country artists of the past. At the magazine's peak from the late 70's until the magazine's 1999 sale, its core of writers included Patrick Carr, Alanna Nash, John Morthland, Peter Guralnick, Ed Ward, Michael Bane, Dave Hickey, Rich Kienzle, Douglas B. Green, Bob Allen and Hazel Smith. In 1978 the three co-founders, known as KBO Publishers, sold the magazine to Candlelite Music, who published it as a bi-monthly until 1981 with co-founder Russell Barnard as editor. Candlelite sold to another entity, who published only briefly before it went bankrupt. In 1983, Barnard re-acquired the Country Music name, created Silver Eagle Publishers and resumed publication from Westport, Connecticut as a high-quality bimonthly. Barnard sold the publication to Sussex Publications in 1999, who moved offices to Nashville. By 2000, Sussex had sold it to American Media, who published until folding it into Country Weekly in 2003.

Its last issue was dated August–September 2003. A second American Media publication on country music, Country Weekly, continued publication after the closure of Country Music.
