= Sycamore, Virginia =

Unincorporated community in Virginia, US

Coordinates: 37°01′28″N 79°21′30″W

Sycamore is an unincorporated community in Pittsylvania County, in the U.S. state of Virginia.
