= Stinker =

Stinker may refer to:

- Southern giant petrel, a large seabird of the southern oceans
- Swamp wallaby of eastern Australia
- Stinker Point, Elephant Island, Antarctica
- a nickname for some Pitts Special aerobatic airplanes, due to the picture of a skunk painted on them
- a nickname for Gollum, a character in The Lord of the Rings novels
- Harold Pinker, a character in P. G. Wodehouse's Jeeves stories also known as "Stinker" Pinker

== See also ==
- Stinky (disambiguation)
