= Natal, Virginia =

Unincorporated community in Virginia, US

Coordinates: 36°59′13″N 79°16′02″W

Natal is an unincorporated community in Pittsylvania County, in the U.S. state of Virginia.
