= Stinky, Donetsk Oblast =

Stinky Стінки (Ukrainian) Стенки (Russian)
- Rural settlement
- Location within Donetsk Oblast Location within Ukraine
- Coordinates: 48°34′38″N 37°44′13″E
- Country (de facto) Country (de jure): Russia; Ukraine
- Oblast: Donetsk Oblast
- Raion: Kramatorsk Raion
- Elevation: 130 m (430 ft)

Population (2001)
  - Total: 265

Stinky (Ukrainian: Стінки) or Stenki (Russian: Стенки) is a rural settlement in eastern Ukraine, located in Kramatorsk Raion, Donetsk Oblast. It had a population of 265 people, as of 2001.

== Name ==
It was named from a natural landmark or park near the village, called Urochyshche Stinky. It was first marked on a map in 1888.

== History ==
According to the 1926 census in the Artemivsk Raion, it was under the Vyroliubivka village council.

10 residents of the village were killed during World War II.

On 13 August 1954 the village was moved to the Mykolaivka village council.

On 9 April 1992, the villages of Stinky, Chervone (Mykolaivka village council) and Izhevka (Kindrativka village council) were transferred to the Novodmytrivka village council.

During the Russo-Ukrainian war, Russia claimed to have captured Stinky on 31 July 2026.

== Politics ==
In the 2014 Ukrainian parliamentary elections, there were 162 registered voters from Stinky, with 29.01% turnout. The most votes (34.04%) were cast for the Communist Party of Ukraine, 23.40% for Opposition Bloc, and 14.88% for People's Front.

== Demographics ==
As of the 1989 Soviet census, the settlement had a population of 363 people, of whom 158 were men and 205 were women.

By the time of the 2001 Ukrainian census, the population had shrunk to 265. Their native languages were:

Language	Number of speakers	%
Russian	237	89.43 %
Ukrainian	27	10.19 %
Other	1	0.38 %
