= Stinking Creek =

Stinking Creek may refer to:

== Streams ==
- Stinking Creek (Kentucky)
- Stinking Creek (Pomme de Terre River), a stream in Missouri
- Stinking Creek (Haw River tributary), a stream in Chatham County, North Carolina
- Stinking Creek, a tributary to Lake Chickasha in Oklahoma
- Stinking Creek (Campbell County, Tennessee)

== Communities ==
- Stinking Creek, Tennessee

== See also ==
- Stinking River
- Stink Creek
