= Dry Branch, Virginia =

Unincorporated community in Virginia, US

Coordinates: 37°14′04″N 80°37′05″W

Dry Branch is an unincorporated community in Pulaski County, in the U.S. state of Virginia.
