= Namozine, Virginia =

Unincorporated community in Virginia, United States

- Unincorporated community
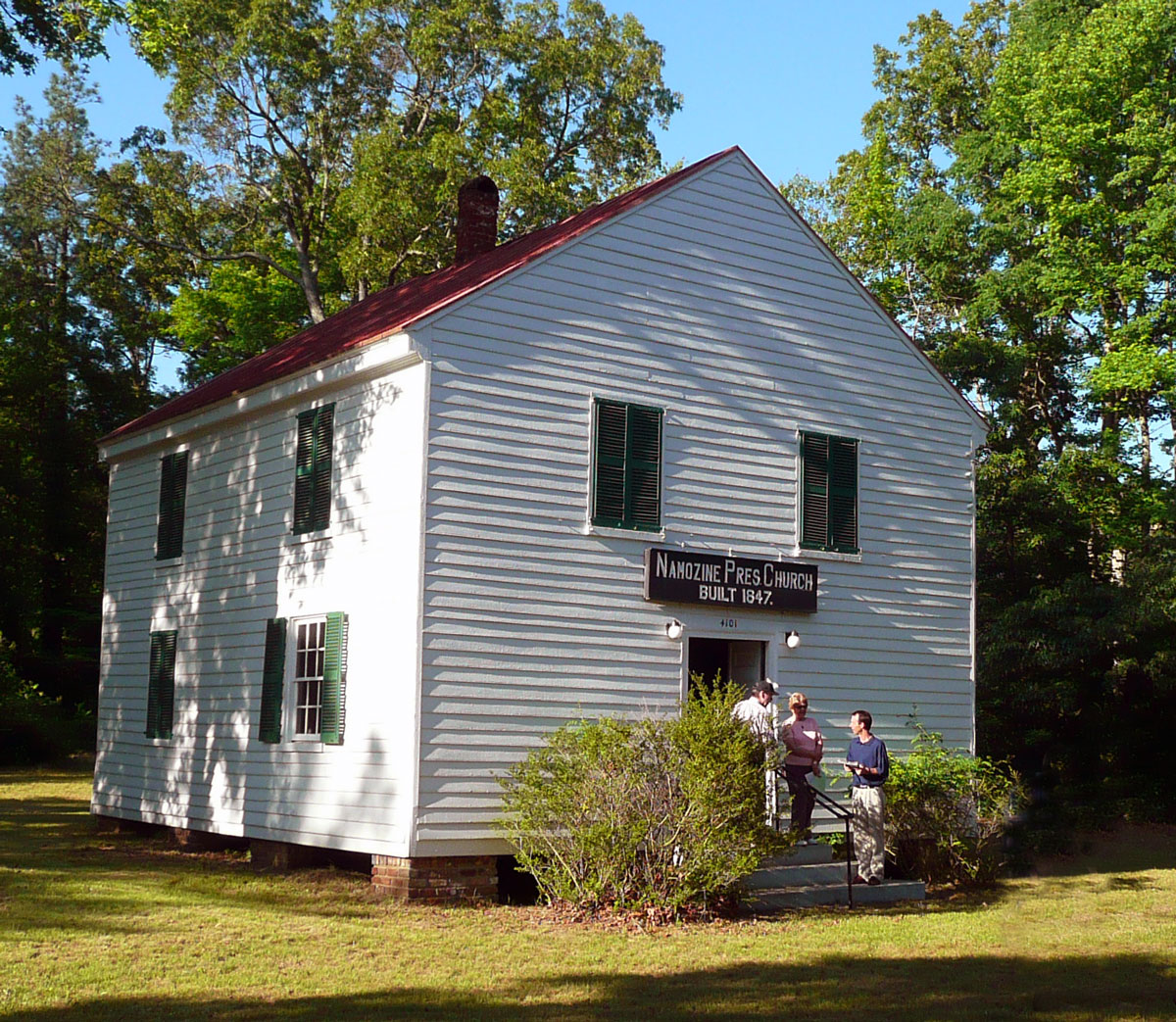
- Namozine Presbyterian Church

- Location within the Commonwealth of Virginia Namozine, Virginia (the United States)
- Coordinates: 37°14′59″N 77°43′30″W
- Country: United States
- State: Virginia
- County: Amelia
- Elevation: 280 ft (85 m)
- Time zone: UTC−5 (Eastern (EST))
  - Summer (DST): UTC−4 (EDT)
- ZIP codes: 23850, 23833, 23002
- Area code: 804
- GNIS feature ID: 1690039

Namozine is a rural unincorporated community near the eastern extremity of Amelia County, just south of the Appomattox River in the U.S. state of Virginia. It is the easternmost hamlet in the county and is situated around the intersections of SR 708 (Namozine Road) with SR 623 (Chesdin Lake Road) and SR 622 (Greenes Road north, Mill Quarter Road south). Roughly 2 miles to the southeast, Namozine Creek forms the county line, flowing northeast into the Appomattox at Lake Chesdin.

The village of Namozine is bisected by the border between ZIP codes 23850 (Ford, VA) and 23833 (Church Road, VA); both post offices are across the line in Dinwiddie County. A small portion of the community is served by the post office some 15 miles northwest at Amelia Court House, the county seat, ZIP code 23002. The nearest volunteer fire station to Namozine is at Mannboro, 6 miles west (there is also a station named Namozine Volunteer Fire & EMS Co. 4, but located near Petersburg almost 15 miles east of Amelia County). "Namozine" (with several variant spellings, originally "Nummisseen" or "Nammisseen") is one of the oldest surviving place-names in the area, dating at least to 1712. It appears to have been used for the creek before it was used for the town.

The hamlet itself may have been called Terrapin Creek until 1841. It was a post village, under the name Namozine, from 1841 until at least the turn of the 20th century. An establishment called Whites Store existed in the community as far back as the time of the Civil War, however; and the spot was still noted as "Whites Store", rather than Namozine, on older 20th-century USGS topographic maps. In the 20th century, a business at the site went by the name of Namozine Country Store, operating under the same ownership for decades before closing in 2010, among the last establishments of its kind in the area.

The historic Namozine Presbyterian Church is located at the intersection of modern-day Namozine and Mill Quarter roads. The Rev. Richard McIlwaine, eleventh president of Hampden–Sydney College, briefly served as pastor there before the start of the Civil War, splitting his pastoral duties between Namozine, Amelia Court House, and Paineville. During the final days of the fighting in Virginia, in the phase known as the Appomattox Campaign, Namozine was the site of the Battle of Namozine Church; the church itself was used as a field hospital by both sides. An on-site historical plaque that summarizes the engagement reads in part:

Namozine Presbyterian Church, built in 1847, fortunately survived the battle. It remains virtually unchanged since its date of construction.

Other historic churches at Namozine include Union Baptist, an African American congregation whose distinctive red-brick building stands less than half a mile east, also on Namozine Road.

During the first part of the 20th century, a segment of SR 38 ran between Amelia Court House and Sutherland, passing by both of the churches in Namozine. This section of the highway was downgraded in 1951 to its modern designation of Route 708 (see Virginia State Route 38).
