= Ammon, Virginia =

Unincorporated community in Virginia, United States

- Unincorporated community
- Location within the Commonwealth of Virginia Ammon, Virginia (the United States)
- Coordinates: 37°12′41″N 77°46′05″W
- Country: United States
- State: Virginia
- County: Amelia
- Elevation: 315 ft (96 m)
- Time zone: UTC−5 (Eastern (EST))
  - Summer (DST): UTC−4 (EDT)
- ZIP code: 23850
- Area code: 804
- FIPS code: 51-01720
- GNIS feature ID: 1477072

Ammon is a rural unincorporated community in the southeastern corner of Amelia County in the U.S. state of Virginia. It is located in Jackson District on SR 600 (Ammon Road) between SR 610 (Wills Road) and SR 622 (Mill Quarter Road). The portion of the border of Dinwiddie and Nottoway counties that is formed by Namozine Creek is 1.5 miles (2.4 km) to the southeast. The nearest volunteer fire department to Ammon is at Mannboro, 5 miles northwest.

== History ==
The precise origins of the name of the hamlet are obscure, although "Ammon" likely came from the Old Testament of the Bible, a reference either to the nation of Ammon, a perennial opponent of the ancient Israelites; or possibly to the idolatrous King Amon, 15th ruler of Judah.

=== Post office ===
At the turn of the 20th century, Ammon was listed as a post village. One of the most distant communities in Amelia from the county seat at Amelia Court House (which lies more than 18 miles northwest by road), Ammon apparently was the last of a long series of Amelia County communities to lose its small mail facility amid the closure of thousands of "fourth class" post offices after the spread of rural free delivery. The area is now served by the post office in Ford, VA, ZIP code 23850, 6 miles south in Dinwiddie County.

=== Civil War ===
During the final phase of the Civil War, the Battle of Namozine Church was fought 3 miles northeast of Ammon, on April 3, 1865. Troops from both sides would have passed close to the town afterward, as the main Confederate contingents under General Robert E. Lee continued their retreat on a westward path just to the north of the area, and Union forces pursued the Rebels and flanked them just to the south. The immediate vicinity of Ammon likely saw stragglers from Namozine but appears to have been spared significant action. The surrender at Appomattox Court House took place just days later, on April 9.

=== Rosenwald School ===
Ammon School, built sometime between 1917 and 1920, was among the first of at least a dozen Rosenwald Schools constructed in Amelia County between 1917 and 1928. The particular design for Ammon School called for a building to accommodate one teacher. The school was located on modern-day Route 610 just north of Route 600, a small structure that stood approximately 1 mile northwest of Ammon proper until at least 2009. During the early 20th century, the Rosenwald project was a collaborative effort that constructed thousands of facilities across the South primarily to improve the education of African American children. After desegregation, the Rosenwald model became obsolete, and many former Rosenwald properties were demolished or sold. The Ammon property was among several former Rosenwald Schools in Amelia County put up for public auction in the late 1960s.
