= Maplewood, Virginia =

Unincorporated community in Virginia, United States

- Unincorporated community
- Location within the Commonwealth of Virginia Maplewood, Virginia (the United States)
- Coordinates: 37.31554°N 78.04884°W
- Country: United States
- State: Virginia
- County: Amelia
- Elevation: 397 ft (121 m)
- Time zone: UTC−5 (Eastern (EST))
  - Summer (DST): UTC−4 (EDT)
- ZIP codes: 23002, 23083
- Area code: 804
- GNIS feature ID: 1477518

Maplewood is a mostly rural unincorporated community in southwest central Amelia County in the U.S. state of Virginia. It is located at the intersection of SR 640/SR 697 (Maplewood Road, a short loop segment of old US 360) and SR 640 (Buckskin Creek Road), just off the four-lane current US 360. Maplewood straddles the border between ZIP codes 23002 (Amelia Court House, the county seat, 4 miles northeast) and 23083 (Jetersville). The nearest volunteer fire station is Amelia County Volunteer Fire Department Co. 3, at Jetersville, just over 2 miles southwest.

At the turn of the 20th century, Maplewood was a post village and a freight station (Milepost 40.0) on what was then the Southern Railway, originally the Richmond and Danville Railroad. The railroad track is still used by freight trains; it parallels Maplewood Road and is now owned by the Norfolk Southern Railway.

== History ==
=== Civil War ===
Maplewood lies along the route followed by Confederate general Robert E. Lee and his army in their retreat during the final days of the Civil War, a phase known as the Appomattox campaign. Numerous roadside historical marker signs have been erected along the route, including an official one on modern-day US 360 at Maplewood that reads as follows:

Near here Lee, moving south toward Danville, in the afternoon of April 5, 1865[,] found the road blocked by Sheridan. He then turned westward by way of Amelia Springs, hoping to reach the Southside (Norfolk and Western) Railroad.

The last major battle fought by Lee's army occurred a few miles west at Sayler's Creek, on the border of Amelia and Prince Edward counties, on April 6, just before the surrender to Ulysses S. Grant at Appomattox on April 9.

=== Tornadoes ===
Amelia County is located in a small Central Virginia tornado alley and has had numerous tornado touchdowns. Tornadoes of note include the twister of April 30, 1924, which killed one person and injured seven others. Traveling from Jetersville to Chula, it destroyed seven homes in Maplewood and then passed east of the courthouse area.

=== Landfill ===
In 1993, despite legal action by local residents, the Maplewood Recycling and Waste Disposal Facility opened, replacing the previous county-operated landfill. With entrance from Maplewood Road west of Buckskin Creek Road, the complex currently covers a total area of 794 acres (321 ha), more than a square mile, and is owned and operated by Waste Management of Virginia, Inc. In the aftermath of the 2014 coal-ash spill in Eden, North Carolina, in which some 39,000 tons of waste flowed into the Dan River, Duke Energy shipped 750 tons of the remaining coal ash via rail from its containment pond at the Dan River Steam Station in Eden to the Maplewood facility.
