= Namozine Creek =

Tributary of the Appomattox River in Virginia, United States

- Location within Commonwealth of Virginia Namozine Creek (the United States)

Location
- Country: United States
- State: Virginia
- Counties: Nottoway, Amelia, Dinwiddie

Physical characteristics
- Source
  - location: Wellville, Virginia
  - coordinates: 37.1365°N 77.913°W
  - elevation: 400 feet (120 m)
- Mouth: Lake Chesdin, Appomattox River
  - location: Winterpock, Virginia
  - coordinates: 37.2621°N 77.6489°W
  - elevation: 157 feet (48 m)
- Length: 23.6 mi (38.0 km)
- Basin size: 63.06 mi^{2} (163.3 km^{2})
- Discharge
  - location: Near SR 623 (Sutherland Rd) and Lake Chesdin Campground
  - average: 75.2 cu ft/s (2.13 m^{3}/s)

Basin features
- GNIS ID: 1471315

Namozine Creek is a 23.6-mile-long (38.0 km) stream in the U.S. state of Virginia. Rising in Nottoway County 6 miles (10 km) northeast of the town of Blackstone, Namozine Creek forms the boundary between Dinwiddie County to its southeast and Nottoway and Amelia counties to its west and northwest for nearly its entire length. The stream flows generally east-northeast, and joins the Appomattox River as a right-bank tributary at Lake Chesdin 13 miles (21 km) west of Petersburg. The Namozine Creek basin consists mostly of forest and farmland; US 460 through Dinwiddie closely follows the southern rim of the watershed for several miles, between Blackstone and Church Road.

== Name and history ==
=== Origins ===
Early spellings of the name on property records include "Nummisseen" and "Nammisseen"; numerous variants (or misspellings) more similar to the present-day version, such as "Namozain", "Namozeen", and "Namozene", arose slightly later. "Nummisseen" appears to be of Native American origin, and may have been the name of a tribe who once lived in the area. "Namozine" is one of the oldest surviving place-names in the area, having been used in one form or another for the creek at least as far back as the 1710s.

=== Eponyms ===
By the early 1800s, the name Namozine was also applied to a section of road through the area, a designation that was revived and put to official use in the 911 road-name system implemented in the 1990s. Modern-day Namozine Road follows a winding series of segments of various numbered secondary routes, chiefly SR 615 and SR 708. Over 35 miles long altogether, Namozine Road runs roughly west to east, from US 360 at Jennings Ordinary in northern Nottoway County, north of Crewe; through the communities of Denaro, Mannboro, and Namozine in southern Amelia County; across Namozine Creek; and finally to US 460 at Sutherland in northeastern Dinwiddie County.

The stream lent its name to "Namozine Flour" in the early 1800s, produced by Hobbs Mill on Namozine Creek and sold in local stores. Hobbs Mill Pond, located off SR 640 (modern-day Hobbs Mill Road) where the road crosses the border between Dinwiddie and Nottoway counties, also supplied water for steam locomotives on the Norfolk & Western Railway line just to the south. The mill continued to operate until the 1960s. In the 1990s, a state historical survey recommended further study of the mill as a significant building "in danger of being lost".

Namozine is also the longstanding name of a community in Amelia County and of a Presbyterian sanctuary in the same village, the site of one of the final engagements of the Civil War. On April 3, 1865, Union forces under General Custer advanced along the Namozine road and crossed Namozine Creek at an undefended spot. Confederate soldiers entrenched at the main stream ford in earthworks that they thought to be a safe defense from the enemy were surprised by the flanking maneuver and fled in haste. The Rebels regrouped, and additional contingents of the two sides clashed in the Battle of Namozine Church that same day, 3 miles west of the stream crossing. Though this fight was inconclusive, the Confederates were already badly depleted, and the surrender at Appomattox occurred on April 9.

Several miles farther east, Namozine is the name of a modern-day volunteer fire department near Petersburg.

== Water quality ==
As of 2022, the U.S. Environmental Protection Agency had noted elevated levels of acidity and dissolved oxygen, sufficient to pose a risk to aquatic life, at monitoring stations within the Namozine Creek subwatershed, and the stream was listed as an impaired waterbody, in need of a restoration plan under Section 303(d) of the Clean Water Act. Water quality for recreation was noted as "Good".

== Tributaries ==
The following are the documented named tributaries of Namozine Creek, with order beginning at the mouth:

Order	Name	Bank	County
1	Fellowbed Branch / Pucketts Branch	Left	Amelia
2	Georges Branch	Right	Dinwiddie
3	Tylers Branch	Right	Dinwiddie

== See also ==
- List of rivers of Virginia
