= Mannboro, Virginia =

Unincorporated community in Virginia, United States

- Unincorporated community
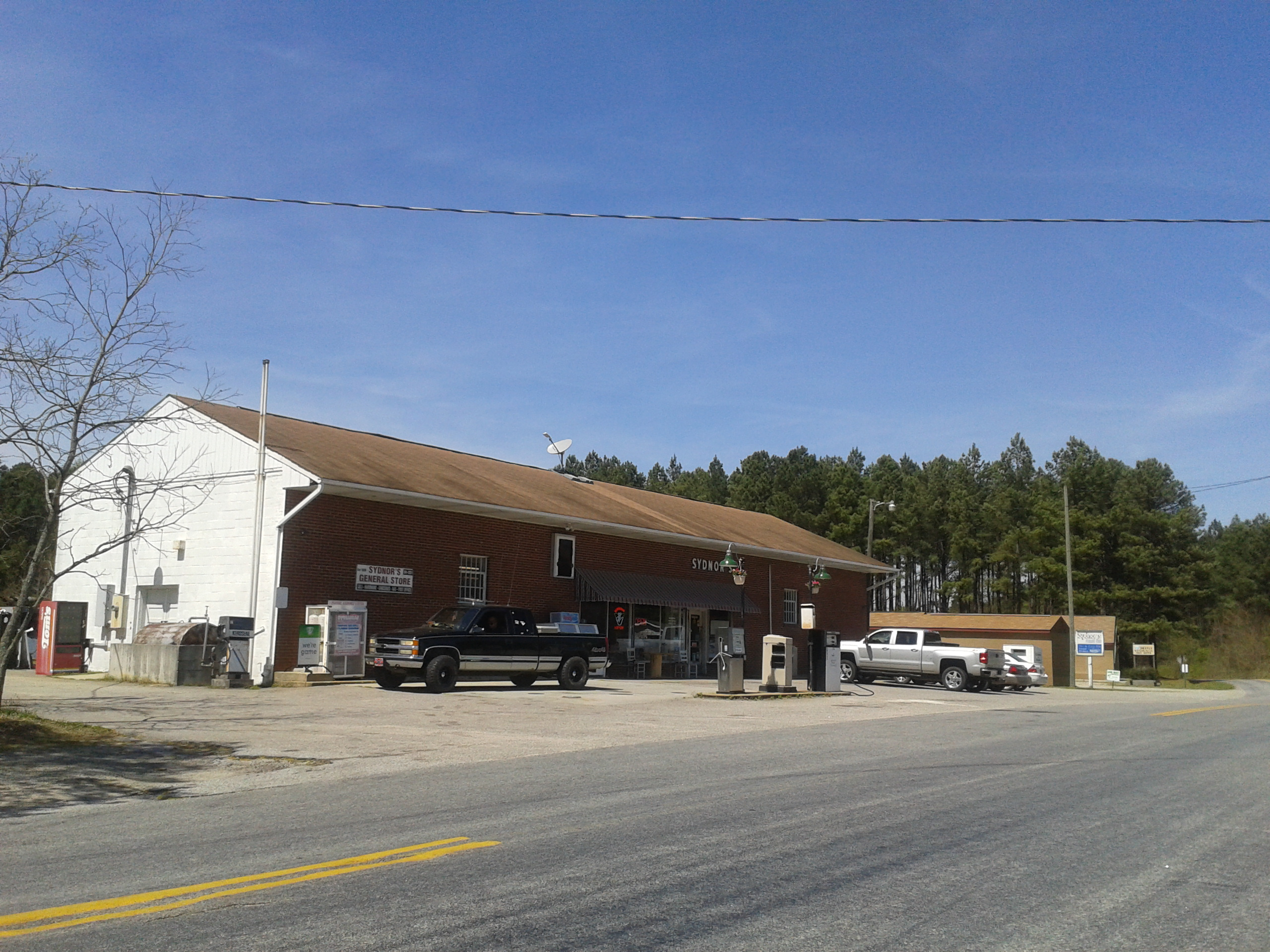
- Sydnor's General Store in Mannboro

- Location within the Commonwealth of Virginia Mannboro, Virginia (the United States)
- Coordinates: 37°15′06″N 77°49′25″W
- Country: United States
- State: Virginia
- County: Amelia
- Elevation: 330 ft (100 m)
- Time zone: UTC−5 (Eastern (EST))
  - Summer (DST): UTC−4 (EDT)
- ZIP codes: 23105, 23002
- Area code: 804
- GNIS feature ID: 1495895

Mannboro is a rural unincorporated community in eastern Amelia County in the U.S. state of Virginia. It is located along SR 612 (Richmond Road) at its split and curve junctions with SR 708 (Namozine Road).

Early spellings of the name included "Mannborough" and "Mannsborough"; in 1829 a post office was established under the name "Mannsboro", one of the first in Amelia County. The present-day Mannboro post office (ZIP code 23105), however, now serves only the immediate vicinity; surrounding areas are assigned to the post office at Amelia Court House (ZIP code 23002), approximately 14 miles (23 km) northwest. Amelia County Volunteer Fire Department Station 2 is also located within community limits.

== History ==
In July 1781, during the Revolutionary War, British Lieutenant Colonel Banastre Tarleton, tasked by Lord Charles Cornwallis with raiding Southside Virginia and destroying "stores of any kind" that could be used by the Continental Army, burned a granary at Mannboro before striking Amelia Court House.

Mannboro also saw action during the Civil War; it lies along the route followed by Confederate general-in-chief Robert E. Lee and his army in their westward retreat during the war's final days. Barton Haxall Wise's biography of his grandfather, former Virginia governor and later Confederate general Henry A. Wise, recounts a clash between his grandfather's troops and those of Union commander Philip Sheridan at Deep Creek near Mannboro. Depleted Confederate forces, hoping to reach a promised delivery of badly needed rations at the Court House rail depot, had just fought an inconclusive battle at Namozine Church, 6 miles east, on April 3. Lee surrendered to Ulysses S. Grant at Appomattox on April 9, 1865.

Mannboro School, built circa 1925 or 1926, was among a dozen or more Rosenwald Schools constructed in Amelia County between 1917 and 1928. The particular design for Mannboro called for a 2‑acre site with a schoolhouse to accommodate two teachers. During the early 20th century, the Rosenwald School project was a collaborative effort that built thousands of facilities across the South primarily for the education of African American children. As late as 1967, after desegregation, a campus named Mannboro School, alternatively called Amelia Academy, continued to operate on Route 612.

During the first part of the 20th century, the portion of SR 38 between Amelia Court House and Sutherland ran through Mannboro. This section of road was downgraded in 1951 to its modern designation of Route 708 (see Virginia State Route 38).

Barrett–Chumney House, located 2 miles south of Mannboro on Route 612, was added to the National Register of Historic Places in 2011. It is also on the Virginia Department of Historic Resources list of historic African American sites in Virginia.
