= Rennie Memorial Presbyterian Church =

Presbyterian Church congregation in Amelia, Virginia

Coordinates: 37°18′5.3″N 77°59′39.3″W

The Rennie Memorial Presbyterian Church is a Presbyterian Church congregation in Amelia, Virginia, US. It was established on April 23, 1950, and sits on grounds that were previously occupied by the Amelia Presbyterian Church.

== Rennie congregation ==
During the late 1880s, Mr Thomas Major organized a Sunday School in a small school house about four miles southwest of Amelia Courthouse, Virginia. For a short period of time Rev. George Denny preached to this small group.

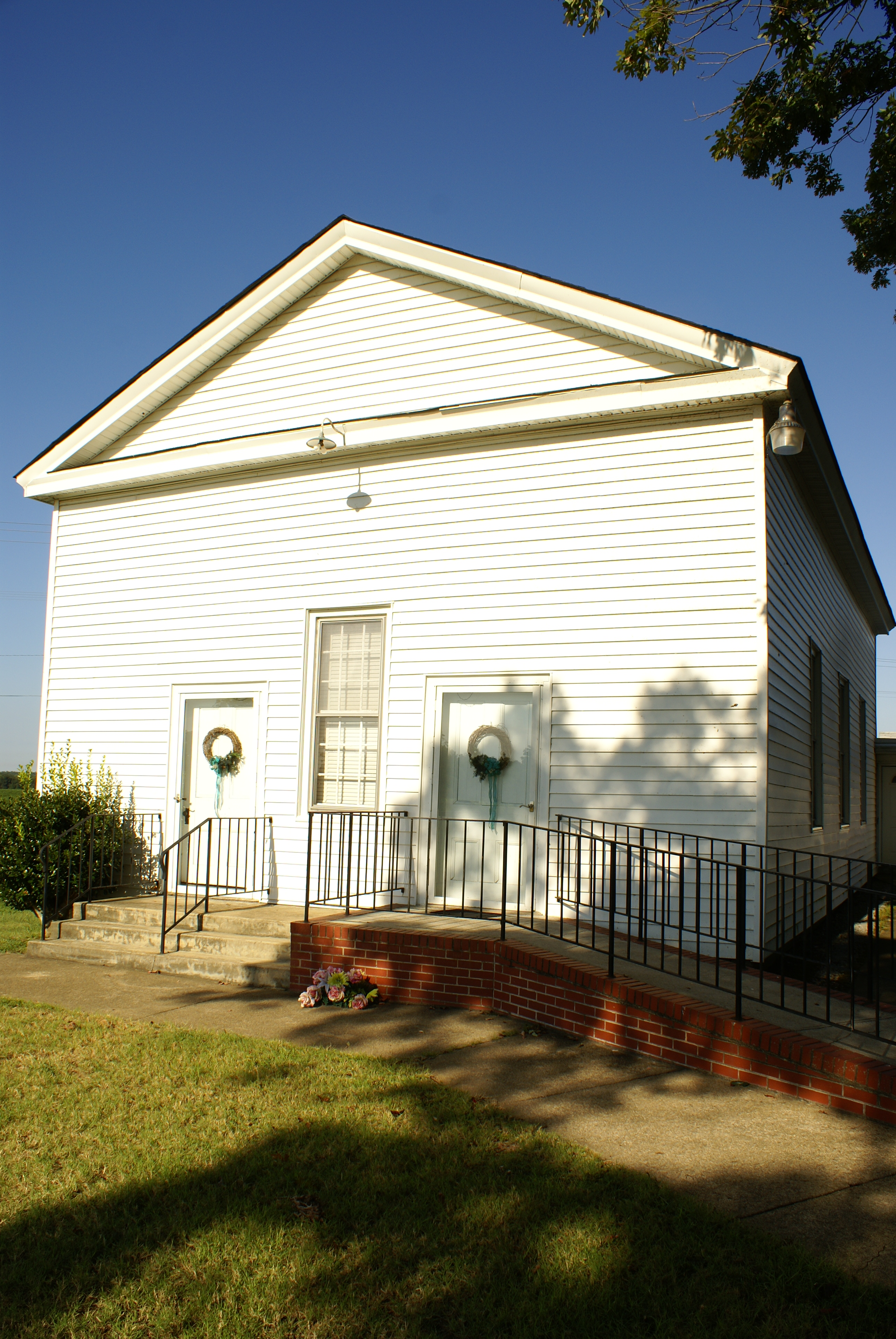

After about ten years, the Sunday School moved to the crossroads known as Dutch Store and began meeting in Mr and Mrs William Harver's school room. Mr S.T. Major was the superintendent and Rev. J.R. Rennie started preaching to the congregation in the school building.

== Building and land donation ==
On October 1, 1912, Rev. D.P. Rogers became pastor of the Amelia group of churches. After his arrival, the Amelia Presbyterian Church erected the building which is still in use today. In 1914, the Amelia Church offered to give the old building to the Rennie congregation, after which the building was taken down and rebuilt by the men of the Rennie community on its present site.

The current building was the old Grub Hill Episcopal Church; it dates back to 1732, making it the oldest church building in the county. The land for the church building and adjoining cemetery was donated by Mr. S.T. Major.

On April 23, 1950, the congregation established itself as a separate and independent church and was officially named as the Rennie Memorial Presbyterian Church. The ruling elders for this newly organized church were W.L. Reames, James Campbell, L.I. Major and C.C. Bishop. The deacons were Woodrow Arrington, O.R. Tomlinson, Clyde Bishop, Lester Curtis and James Lee Hall. Rev. Douglas Wilkinson was the minister at the time. The church continued to grow and by the early 1960s, the building ran four Sunday School rooms, a basement Fellowship Hall, kitchen and storage area.

== Cluster system ==
By the late-1960s, a plan was proposed by the Presbytery for a cluster system to be formed among the Rennie Memorial, the Amelia, the Pine Grove and the Mattoax churches. These four churches called their first pastor in January 1974 and ACTS (Amelia Cluster Teens) group became very active in the community.

In 1987, Amelia Presbyterian Church requested to withdraw from the cluster system. The remaining three congregations arranged a system where one minister could serve them. Rennie Memorial opted to have services early on Sunday mornings to accommodate such a necessity, while the Mattoax and the Pine Grove congregations worshiped together with the same minister.

In 1999, the cluster system ended. The Mattoax and the Pine Grove congregations continued to worship together with their pastor, the Rev. Patrice Bittner-Humphreys.

== Modern ministry ==
In the 2000s, Rennie Memorial has continued with education and Biblical learning since it began in the 1880s. The congregation has shifted from having full-time pastors to having student interns who stay for varying durations in order to learn ministry in a congregational setting.
