= Virginia State Route 38 =

State highway in Amelia County in Virginia, United States

State Route 38

Route information
- Maintained by VDOT
- Length: 7.03 mi (11.31 km)
- Existed: July 1, 1933–present
- Tourist routes: Virginia Byway

Major junctions
- West end: US 360 Bus. / SR 1009 in Amelia Court House
- SR 614 in Amelia Court House
- East end: SR 153 / SR 602 at Scotts Fork

Location
- Country: United States
- State: Virginia
- Counties: Amelia

Highway system
- Virginia Routes; Interstate; US; Primary; Secondary; Byways; History; HOT lanes
← SR 37	→ SR 39

State Route 38 (SR 38) is a primary state highway in the U.S. state of Virginia. Known for most of its length as Five Forks Road, SR 38 runs 7.03 miles (11.31 km) from U.S. Route 360 Business (US 360 Business) in Amelia Court House east to SR 153 at Scotts Fork.

== Route description ==
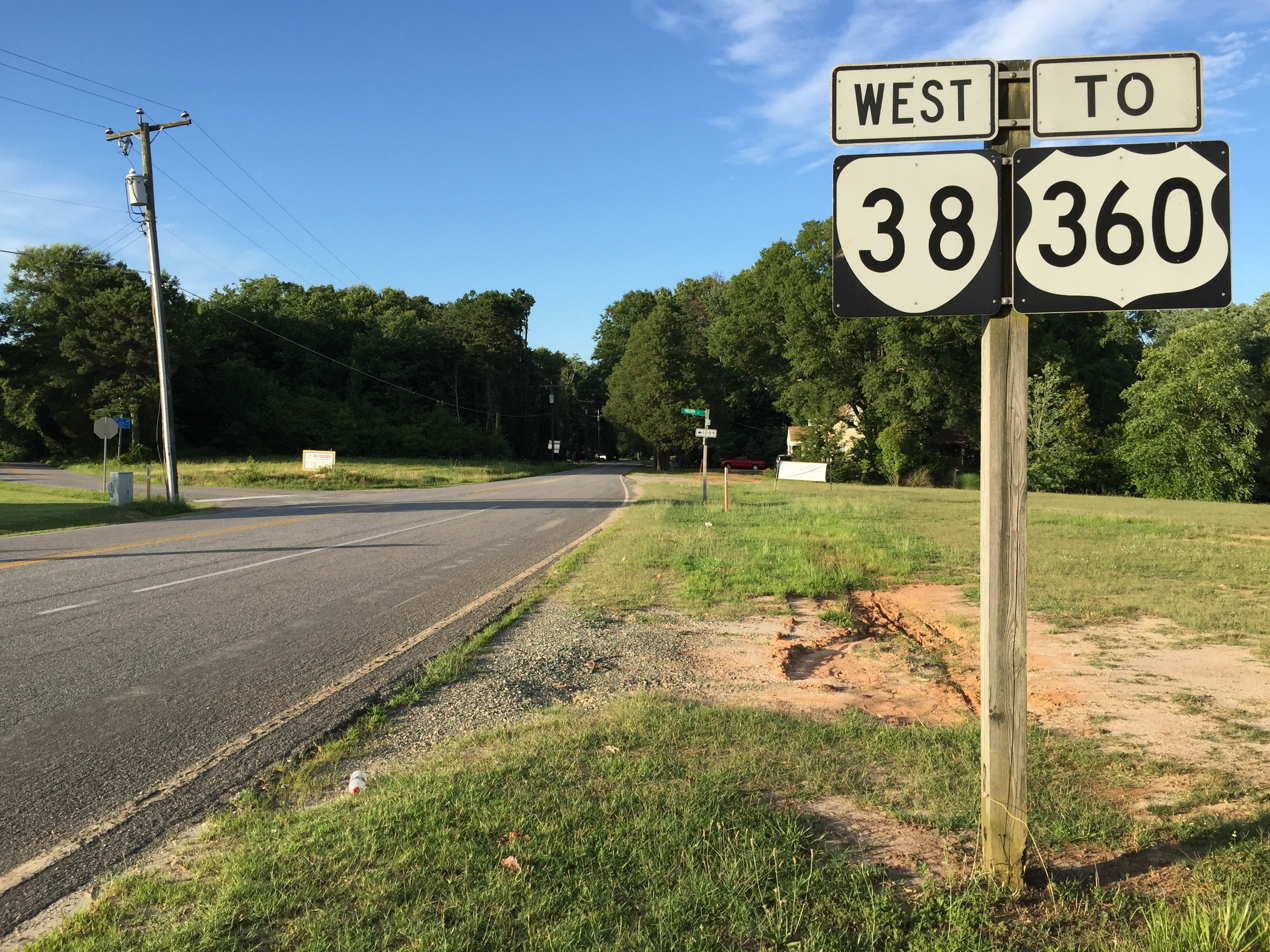
View west along SR 38 at SR 1009 in Amelia Court House

SR 38 begins at an intersection with US 360 Business (Goodes Bridge Road) in Amelia Court House. In Amelia, SR 38 makes a stairstep series of single-block right-angle turns at the courthouse square: It heads south on Virginia Street, turns east onto Court Street, turns south onto Washington Street to follow the east side of the courthouse property, turns east onto Church Street, and turns south onto Five Forks Road, passing Amelia Academy. One mile south of Church Street, at Amelia County High School, SR 38 turns east, at a junction formerly called Five Forks. From this intersection, SR 614 runs northwest as Otterburn Road and south as Dennisville Road; and SR 38, still named Five Forks Road, heads east through countryside for 5.9 miles to SR 153 (Military Road) at Scotts Fork. Scotts Fork marks the eastern terminus of SR 38, but the roadway continues east as SR 602 (Bevils Bridge Road) into Chesterfield County toward Petersburg.

== History ==
SR 38 follows a portion of the route taken by Confederate general Robert E. Lee and his army in their retreat westward during the final days of the Civil War. Confederate forces, hoping to reach a promised delivery of desperately needed rations at the Court House rail depot, had just fought an inconclusive battle at Namozine Church on April 3, 1865. Lee surrendered to Ulysses S. Grant at Appomattox on April 9.

All of SR 38, plus extensions east to Sutherland and northwest to Tobaccoville, was State Route 406 before the 1933 renumbering. At that time, SR 38 was assigned to the piece from Amelia Court House east to Sutherland; Amelia Court House to Tobaccoville became part of State Route 49. In the 1940 renumbering, SR 49 was greatly truncated, and SR 38 was extended northwest over former SR 49 to Tobaccoville. SR 38 east of the south junction with SR 153, a section deemed of "little primary significance", was transferred to the secondary system in 1951 as SR 708; the rest of SR 38 east of Amelia Court House became an extension of SR 153. However, later that year, the SR 38 designation was restored to the piece from Amelia Court House to the SR 153/SR 708 junction, and SR 153 was rerouted to go north from Scotts Fork to US 360. The overlap with SR 153 has since been removed. The piece of SR 38 from Tobaccoville via Morven to Amelia Court House became SR 681 in 1954.

== Major intersections ==
The entire route is in Amelia County.

Location	mi	km	Destinations	Notes
Amelia Court House	0.00	0.00	US 360 Bus. (Goodes Bridge Road) / SR 1009 (Virginia Street)	Western terminus
Amelia Court House	1.15	1.85	SR 614 (Otterburn Road / Dennisville Road) – Otterburn, Pontons Store, Blackstone	
Scotts Fork	5.88	9.46	SR 153 (Military Road) / SR 602 (Bevils Bridge Road) – Richmond, Blackstone, Fort Barfoot	Eastern terminus
1.000 mi = 1.609 km; 1.000 km = 0.621 mi

< SR 131	Spurs of SR 13; 1923–1928	SR 133 >
< SR 405	District 4 State Routes; 1928–1933	SR 407 >
