= Denaro =

Denaro is the Italian word for money, derived from the Arabic dinar, which in turn derived from the Latin denarius. Denaro may also refer to:

- Denaro, Virginia, an unincorporated community in Amelia County
- Arthur Denaro (born 1948), general of the British Army
- Matteo Messina Denaro (1962–2023), a Sicilian Mafia boss
- French denier, medieval coin
