= The Amelia Bulletin Monitor =

Weekly newspaper in Amelia County, Virginia

- Type: Weekly newspaper
- Owner(s): ABM Enterprises, Inc.
- Publisher: Bekki Morris
- Editor: Wayne Russell
- Founded: 1973
- Headquarters: 16311 Goodes Bridge Road Amelia Court House, Va. 23002
- Circulation: 8,581 (as of 2021)
- Website: ameliamonitor.com

The Amelia Bulletin Monitor is a weekly newspaper in Amelia County, Virginia, founded in 1973. Prior to its founding, the county had been without a newspaper since the 1940s, when the Amelia Gazette shut down. The Monitor, as the current paper is known, was founded by Ann B. Morris (now Ann B. Salster), who was the paper's owner and publisher until she died July 14, 2017. Her daughter, Rebecca "Bekki" Morris, now runs the weekly newspaper.

== History ==
In 1973, Ann had recently moved to the county with her husband, Sam Morris, whose family owned a local hardware store and had lived in the county for several generations. At the time, some affluent white citizens of the county were founding Amelia Academy, a private school. The enterprise was seen as a movement against the integration of public schools, which had happened in Amelia County during the late 1960s. The county had considered shutting down its public schools rather than integrating them, as neighboring Prince Edward County had done. But some influential Amelia people said it was not "the Christian thing to do." So, the schools were integrated. Ann felt that Amelia Academy was not a positive undertaking for the county, and called her father to tell him about it. Her father told her to write a letter to the local newspaper. She told him there was no local paper, and he responded: "Start one." Morris was the editor and publisher until 1990, when her second husband, Mike Salster, became editor. Ann Salster remained as publisher. Mike Salster was an award-winning veteran of daily newspapers, including The Columbus Dispatch in Columbus, Ohio. He left the paper to work for the Virginia state government in 2001, and Assistant Editor Wayne Russell, who had worked at the paper since 1981, became editor. He is still in that position.

== Today ==
The Monitor prints about 10,500 papers each week. It goes to press Tuesday night and is mailed out Wednesday to arrive at subscribers homes and businesses Thursday. Every residence and business in Amelia County, along with many in parts of Chesterfield, Nottoway and Powhatan counties, receives a free copy of each week's paper. There also are several hundred paid subscriptions for people all over the world, including in New York City and Japan, and single copies are sold for 75 cents at various businesses and at the Monitor's office. Some Amelia County residents purchase paid subscriptions, at a greatly discounted rate, in addition to their free ones. The paper has recently asked more Amelia County residents to do this, so the paper can bring in enough money to maintain its circulation and second-class mailing privileges.
