= Otterburn =

Otterburn may refer to:

- Otterburn, Northumberland, England
  - Otterburn Training Area, the UK's largest military firing range
- Otterburn, North Yorkshire, England
- Otterburn, Michigan, an unincorporated location now a part of Swartz Creek, Michigan
- Otterburn, Virginia
- Otterburn (Bedford, Virginia), a house
- Otterburn Park, Quebec

== People with the surname ==
- Adam Otterburn, 16th century Scottish lawyer and diplomat

== See also ==
- Battle of Otterburn
