= Denaro, Virginia =

Unincorporated community in Virginia, United States

- Unincorporated community
- Location within the Commonwealth of Virginia Denaro, Virginia (the United States)
- Coordinates: 37°14′43″N 77°59′03″W
- Country: United States
- State: Virginia
- County: Amelia
- Elevation: 328 ft (100 m)
- Time zone: UTC−5 (Eastern (EST))
  - Summer (DST): UTC−4 (EDT)
- ZIP code: 23002
- Area code: 804
- GNIS feature ID: 1499334

Denaro is a rural unincorporated community in south-central Amelia County in the U.S. state of Virginia. It is located 0.4 mi (0.6 km) north of the Amelia–Nottoway county line at the split & curve junctions of SR 614 (Dennisville Road) and SR 613 (Namozine Road).

Denaro was a post village in the early 1900s. The community is now served by the post office eight miles north at the county seat, Amelia Court House, ZIP code 23002. The nearest volunteer fire departments are Amelia County Station 3, at Jetersville, eight miles northwest, and Amelia County Station 1, at Amelia Court House.

St. Johns United Methodist Church, established in 1894, is located approximately one mile west, on SR 615 (Namozine Road).
