= Gills, Virginia =

Unincorporated community in Virginia, United States

- Unincorporated community
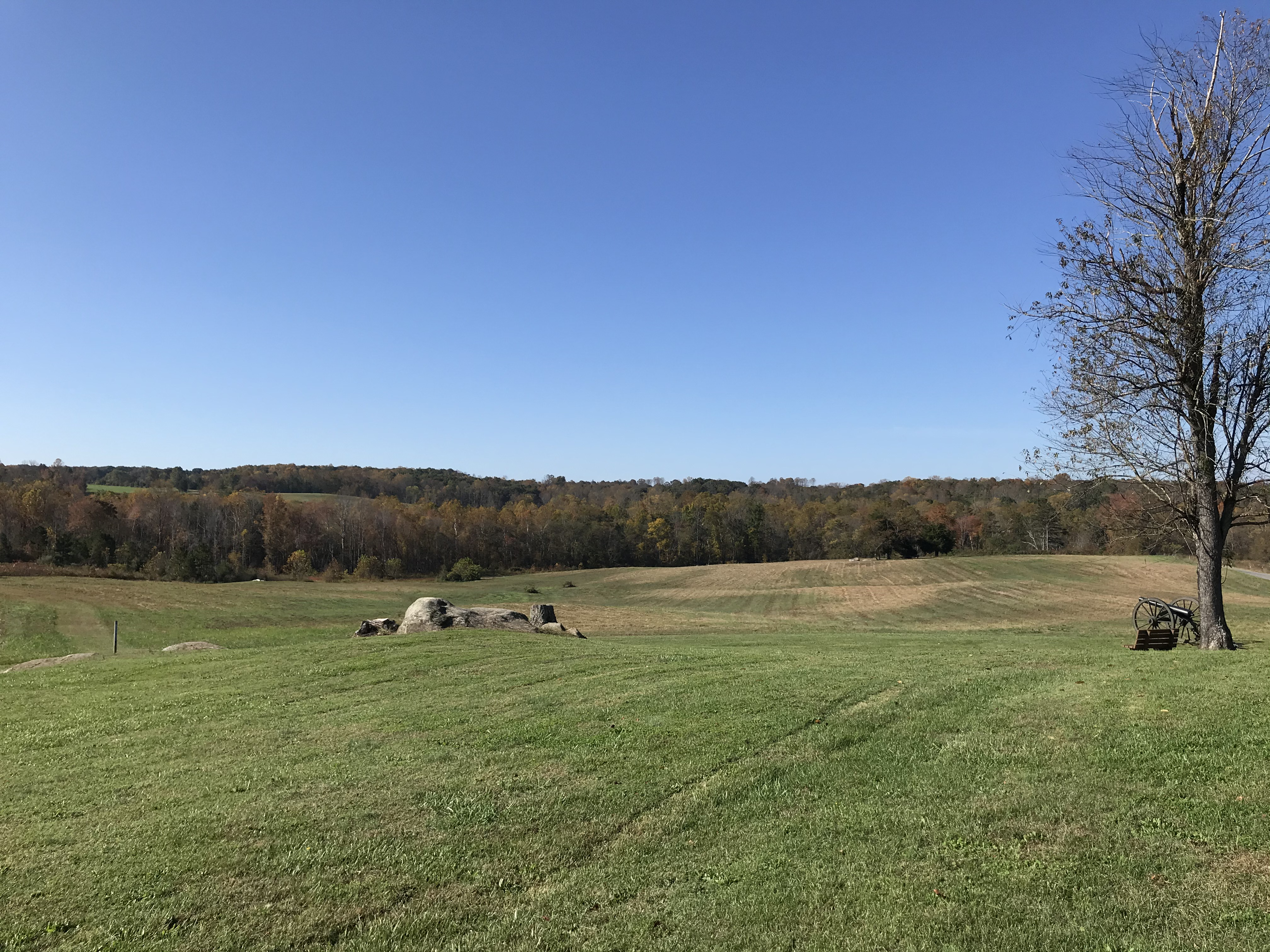
- Wheaton Trailhead, Sayler's Creek Battlefield, near Gills

- Location within the Commonwealth of Virginia Gills, Virginia (the United States)
- Coordinates: 37.2935°N 78.1986°W
- Country: United States
- State: Virginia
- County: Amelia
- Elevation: 527 ft (161 m)
- Time zone: UTC−5 (Eastern (EST))
  - Summer (DST): UTC−4 (EDT)
- ZIP codes: 23083, 23966, 23922
- Area codes: 804, 434
- FIPS code: 51/30960
- GNIS feature ID: 1497787

Gills is a rural unincorporated community in Amelia County in the U.S. state of Virginia. It is located in Leigh District around the intersections of SR 616 (S. Genito Road) with SR 657 (Selma Road), 1 mile (1.6 km) north of the Nottoway county line. Gills is situated at the highest point in Amelia County, 527 feet (161 m) above sea level, and is also the westernmost extant hamlet in the county. A portion of the segment of U.S. Bicycle Route 1 that runs southwest from Richmond follows SR 616 through Gills.

== History ==
The community now noted as Gills has undergone several name changes. It was called New London for a time. An early landmark was Pride's Church, a designator that was used into the middle of the 19th century; John Pride III was a prominent figure in local and state politics in the late 1700s. A village post office noted as "Pride Church" operated briefly in Amelia County in the early 1820s, although it is not certain that it referred to the same community. A post office called "Pride's Church" was established in 1852, at a spot noted on period maps at the location later called Gills.

The church itself was a crude structure that dated back to the 1700s. Nevertheless it hosted several prominent guest preachers: Itinerant revivalist Francis Asbury visited in 1794, one of the first of a number of his ministry endeavors in and around Amelia County; and a sermon described by an eyewitness as "the finest specimen of pulpit oratory he had ever heard" was delivered at Pride's Church in the 1840s by Presbyterian minister, educator, and Confederate chaplain Moses Drury Hoge, a grandson of minister, educator, and abolitionist Moses Hoge.

By the time of the Civil War, the church was missing from most maps, and a "Craddock's Store" appeared at the same location. An "A. Gills" lived on Pride's Church Road just east of the site of the church. An establishment called Gill's Mill operated on Sayler's Creek just to the west of Pride's Church; a community dubbed Gill's Store was listed in the late 1800s, receiving mail from the post office in Deatonville, just north of the location of Pride's Church and Craddock's Store. By 1900, a post office was in service using the name Gills. Most of the vicinity of Gills is now assigned to the post office 7 miles east at Jetersville (ZIP code 23083); small portions are served by the post offices in Rice (ZIP code 23966) and Burkeville (ZIP code 23922) in neighboring counties.

Gills lies near the route taken by Confederate general Robert E. Lee and his army in their retreat during the final days of the Civil War. Intercepting Federal troops and cavalry moved past Pride's Church itself, as well as Gill's Mill. The two sides met and clashed in their last major battle, April 6, 1865, just over a mile west of modern-day Gills at Sayler's Creek, on the border of Amelia and Prince Edward counties. The surrender to Ulysses S. Grant at Appomattox took place on April 9. The countryside around the Sayler's Creek battlefield still looks much as it did in the 1860s.

Farmer House, 3 miles (5 km) east of Gills, was added to the National Register of Historic Places in 1978.
