= Chumney =

Chumney is a surname. Notable people with the surname include:

- Brian Chumney, American sound editor
- Carol Chumney (born 1961), American lawyer and politician
- Desmond Chumney (born 1968), Canadian cricketer

== See also ==
- Barrett–Chumney House
