= Gazetteer abbreviations =

Abbreviations used for maps

Charles City County, Virginia from 1895 state map

This is a list of common atlas and gazetteer abbreviations. These abbreviations are not always used consistently between publications; some terms have fallen out of use over time. Older gazetteers and atlases often neglect to define abbreviations and underlying terms. Gazetteer and map abbreviations can show up in several forms: upper or lower case, with or without periods, sometimes with hyphens (e.g., Post Village may be P.V., PV, p.v., or p-v).

This list does not include direction headings (e.g., N. or No. for north, etc.), which are generally clear.

== List of gazetteer and map abbreviations ==
abbreviation	term	usage and notes
br.	Branch	
c.	Cape	
C.H.	Court House	
Co.	County	
Cr.	Creek	
c.t.	County Town	similar to a county seat
dist.	district	
G.	Gulf	
Lat.	Latitude	
Long.	Longitude	
Mntn.	Mountains	
ms., m.	miles	
Nat'l	National	
Par.	Parish	
Pt.	Point	
P.O.	Post Office	
P.T.	Post Town	A town having the chief post office of a local area.
P.V.	Post Village	
Sq. ms.	Square Miles	
Sta.	Station	often denotes a local rail road station
t.	town or township	
v.	village	
r.r.	rail road	

== See also ==
- Administrative division
