= Battle of Namozine Church =

Battle of the American Civil War

Coordinates: 37°14′56″N 77°43′32″W

- Part of the American Civil War
Date	April 3, 1865
Location	Namozine, Amelia County, Virginia
Result	Inconclusive

Belligerents
United States	Confederate States

Commanders and leaders
George Armstrong Custer	Fitzhugh Lee

Strength
1,000	700

Casualties and losses
95 killed and wounded	Unknown killed, 15 wounded, 350 captured

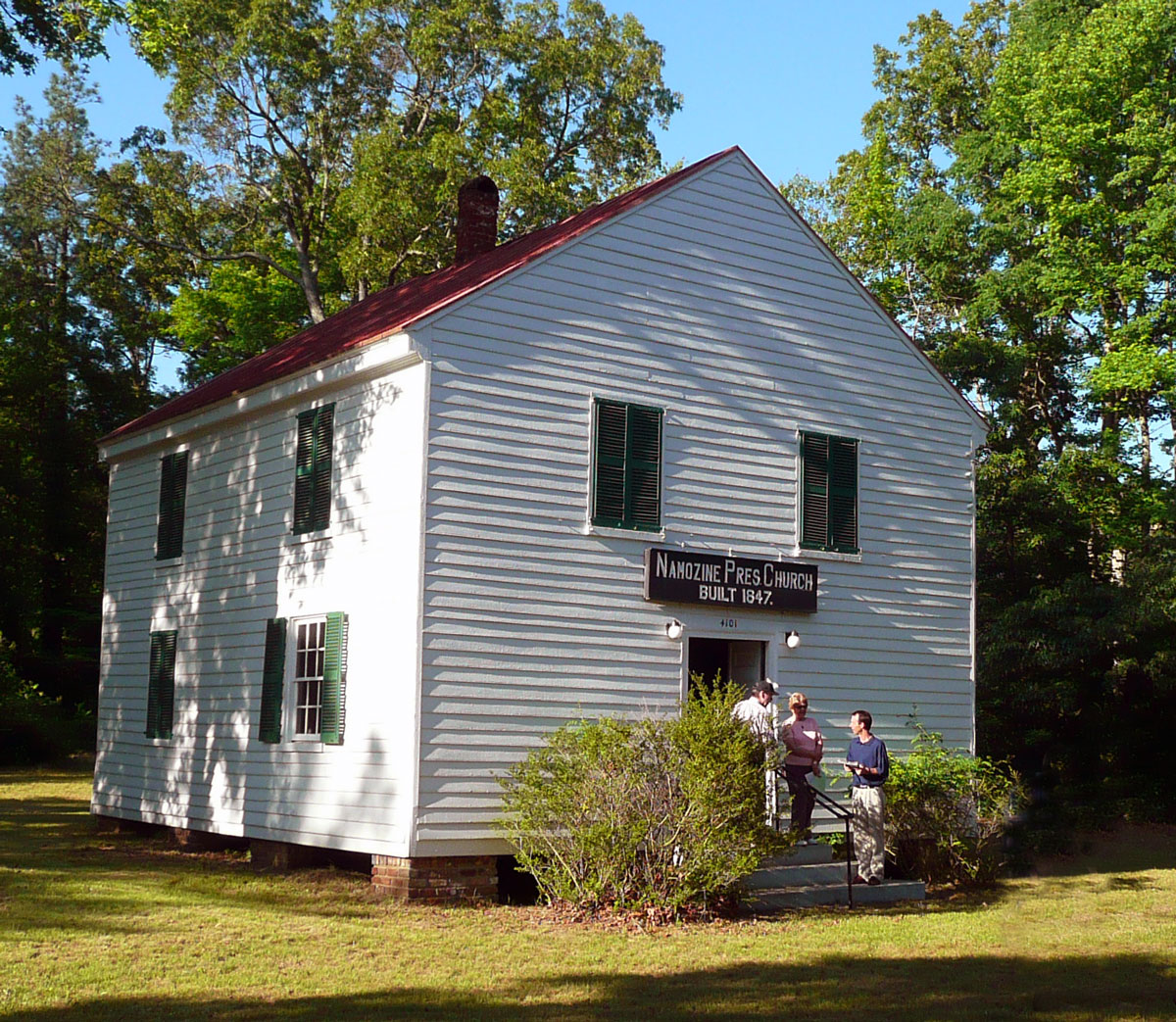
Namozine Presbyterian Church, maintained by the Amelia Historical Society, Amelia County, Virginia, 2009

The Battle of Namozine Church was an engagement in Amelia County, Virginia, between Union Army and Confederate States Army forces that occurred on April 3, 1865, during the Appomattox Campaign of the American Civil War. The battle was the first engagement between units of General Robert E. Lee's Confederate Army of Northern Virginia after that army's evacuation of Petersburg and Richmond, Virginia, on April 2, 1865, and units of the Union Army (Army of the Shenandoah, Army of the Potomac and Army of the James) under the immediate command of Maj. Gen. Philip Sheridan, who was still acting independently as commander of the Army of the Shenandoah, and under the overall direction of Union General-in-Chief Lt. Gen. Ulysses S. Grant. The forces immediately engaged in the battle were brigades of the cavalry division of Union Brig. Gen. and Brevet Maj. Gen. George Armstrong Custer, especially the brigade of Colonel and Brevet Brig. Gen. William Wells, and the Confederate rear guard cavalry brigades of Brig. Gen. William P. Roberts and Brig. Gen. Rufus Barringer and later in the engagement, Confederate infantry from the division of Maj. Gen. Bushrod Johnson.

The engagement signaled the beginning of the Union Army's relentless pursuit of the Confederate forces (Army of Northern Virginia and Richmond local defense forces) after the fall of Petersburg and Richmond after the Third Battle of Petersburg (sometimes known as the Breakthrough at Petersburg or Fall of Petersburg), which led to the near disintegration of Lee's forces within 6 days and the Army of Northern Virginia's surrender at Appomattox Court House, Virginia, on April 9, 1865. Capt. Tom Custer, the general's brother, was cited at this battle for the first of two Medals of Honor that he received for actions within four days.

== Background ==
=== Siege and Breakthrough at Petersburg ===
During the 292-day Richmond–Petersburg Campaign (Siege of Petersburg) Union General-in-Chief Ulysses S. Grant had to conduct a campaign of trench warfare and attrition in which the Union forces tried to wear down the less numerous Confederate Army of Northern Virginia, destroy or cut off sources of supply and supply lines to Petersburg and Richmond, and extend the defensive lines which the outnumbered and declining Confederate force had to defend to the breaking point. After the Battle of Hatcher's Run on February 5–7, 1865, extended the armies' lines another 4 miles (6.4 km), Lee had few reserves after manning the lengthened Confederate defenses. Lee knew he must soon move part or all of his army from the Richmond and Petersburg lines, obtain food and supplies at Danville, Virginia, or possibly Lynchburg, Virginia, and join General Joseph E. Johnston's force opposing Major General William T. Sherman's army in North Carolina. Lee thought that if the Confederates could quickly defeat Sherman, they might turn back to oppose Grant before he could combine his forces with Sherman's.

After the Confederate defeats at the Battle of Fort Stedman and Jones's Farm on March 25, 1865, Lee knew that Grant would soon move against the only remaining Confederate supply lines to Petersburg, the South Side Railroad and the Boydton Plank Road to Petersburg, which also might cut off all routes of retreat from Richmond and Petersburg.

After an offensive begun on the night of March 28–March 29, 1865, that included the Battle of Lewis's Farm, Battle of White Oak Road and the Battle of Dinwiddie Court House, Grant's Union Army broke the Confederate States Army defenses of Petersburg, Virginia, at the Battle of Five Forks on April 1 and the Third Battle of Petersburg on April 2.

Union Army cavalry and V Corps infantry of the still formally organized Army of the Shenandoah, many recently detached from the Army of the Potomac, numbering about 22,000 men under the command of Maj. Gen. Philip Sheridan, defeated Pickett's task force of about 10,000 Confederate cavalry and infantry from the Army of Northern Virginia at the Battle of Five Forks, Virginia, about 4 miles (6.4 km) beyond the western end of the Confederate lines. After sustaining about 800 casualties and losing between 2,400 and 4,000 men who were captured, the remaining Confederates retreated from the strategic Five Forks crossroads to Ford's Station, or Ford's Meeting House, on the South Side Railroad.

At the Third Battle of Petersburg, four Confederate brigades stood west of Hatcher's Run and due east of Five Forks along White Oak Road where it is met by Claiborne Road. The attack against these brigades by II Corps of the Army of the Potomac under the command of Maj. Gen. Andrew A. Humphreys sent the Confederates into retreat to Sutherland's Station, or Sutherland's Depot, on the South Side Railroad. Confederate Maj. Gen. Henry Heth, who succeeded to corps command upon the death in action of Lt. Gen. A. P. Hill on April 1, organized a defense with these brigades but left them under the command of Brig. Gen. John R. Cooke as Heth returned to Petersburg.

At the Battle of Sutherland's Station, a Union Army division under the command of Brigadier General Nelson A. Miles broke up the last defense of the South Side Railroad on the afternoon of April 2, cutting off that railroad as a supply line or route of retreat for the Confederates. The initial attack by a single Union brigade against a hastily fortified line was repulsed with heavy losses. After a second futile attempt to take the Confederate position by two Union brigades, Miles attacked again with his entire force in mid-afternoon and overwhelmed the Confederates, starting with the collapse of the brigade of Brig. Gen. Samuel McGowan on the Confederate left flank. As a result of the Confederate defeat, the South Side Railroad, the Confederates' last supply line, was cut and General Robert E. Lee's Army of Northern Virginia had to abandon Petersburg and Richmond and flee westward.

=== Confederate army flight ===
General Lee's Army of Northern Virginia evacuated Petersburg, Virginia, and the Confederate capital of Richmond, Virginia, on the night of April 2–3 and began a march toward Danville, Virginia, hoping to link up with General Joseph E. Johnston's, army which was attempting to slow the advance the Union army group commanded by Major General William T. Sherman in North Carolina. Much of the Army of Northern Virginia, along with Confederate president Jefferson Davis and his cabinet, were able to escape from Petersburg and Richmond just ahead of the Union troops entering those cities on April 3 because Confederate rear guard forces, especially at Forts Gregg and Whitworth, Fort Mahone and the Battle of Sutherland's Station, fought desperate delaying actions on April 2 to give most of the Confederates a head start on Union Army pursuers. General Lee first planned to reunite the four columns of his army which left Petersburg and Richmond and to resupply the army at Amelia Court House, Virginia, 39 miles (63 km) southwest of Richmond. Lee's men left their positions in Petersburg and Richmond with only one day's rations. Lee expected to find a supply train of rations that he had ordered brought to Amelia Court House to meet the army.

Most of Lee's army marched west on routes north of the Appomattox River, but the remnants of the divisions of Maj. Gen. George Pickett and of Maj. Gen. Bushrod Johnson, the latter of which included the brigades of Confederate Brig. Gens. Henry A. Wise, William Henry Wallace and Young Marshall Moody, along with cavalry corps commander Maj. Gen. Fitzhugh Lee, whose division was under the command of Colonel Thomas Munford, and the division of Maj. Gen. W.H.F. "Rooney" Lee following as a rear guard moved on the Namozine Road, south of the river. While most of Lee's army had an effective one-day head start on their flight from Richmond and Petersburg, the advance Union Army cavalry and infantry corps commanded by Maj. Gen. Philip Sheridan were able to keep Lee's forces to their north by pursuing them on a parallel course to their south. Union cavalry harassed and skirmished with Confederate units almost from the outset of the Confederate army's march from Petersburg. Confederate rear guard dismounted cavalry units often paused to block the roads from pursuing Union cavalry. As early as the evening of April 2, Confederate cavalry under Fitzhugh Lee detected units of the Union cavalry division of Brig. Gen. Thomas Devin in pursuit and had Bushrod Johnson's infantry throw up a series of breastworks along the Namozine Road in order to repulse the Union riders.

On April 3, 1865, advance units of the Union cavalry fought with rear guard Confederate cavalry at Willicomack Creek and the Battle of Namozine Church. In the early morning of April 3, at a ford on Namozine Creek, regiments from the 2d brigade, under the command of Colonel William Wells, of Custer's 3rd cavalry division, which had taken over the advance pursuit, threatened the rear guard of Rooney Lee's column. That rear guard was the cavalry brigade of Brig. Gen. William P. Roberts and a few infantry units. Roberts had dismounted the 4th North Carolina Cavalry Regiment and the 16th North Carolina Cavalry Battalion and had them entrench on the west side of the creek. Custer brought up artillery to blast the North Carolina cavalrymen with canister and had the 1st Vermont Volunteer Cavalry Regiment ford the creek out of sight of the Confederates in order to outflank them. When the Confederates discovered this maneuver, they fled their position in order to try to regroup further down the road. Custer's division then crossed the creek and headed for Namozine Church, about 5 miles (8.0 km) away. The leading Union cavalry brigade of Custer's 3rd Division, the 2d Brigade under Col. William Wells, who had attacked the Confederate cavalrymen of Brig. Gen. Rufus Barringer along the creek, fought a running battle along the road until they reached Namozine Church.

Barringer's Confederates, the 1st and 2d North Carolina Volunteer Cavalry Regiments with a single artillery piece, with the 5th North Carolina Volunteer Cavalry Regiment in reserve, (Note: Barringer's brigade also included the 3rd North Carolina Volunteer Cavalry Regiment.) counterattacked the 8th New York Volunteer Cavalry Regiment of Wells's brigade, commanded by Maj. James Bliss, as they reached the Namozine Church After sharp fighting, the Confederate cavalry were turned away by the 8th New York Cavalry and reinforcements from the 15th New York Volunteer Cavalry Regiment, commanded by Col. John J. Coppinger' and the 1st Vermont Volunteer Cavalry Regiment, commanded by Lt. Col. Josiah Hall. About 9:00 a.m., as Wells' brigade began their attack, Brig. Gen. Custer's younger brother, Captain Tom Custer, spurred his horse over a hastily thrown-up barricade of the still-deploying Confederate cavalry and captured 3 Confederate officers and 11 enlisted men, as well as the battle flag of the 2nd North Carolina Cavalry. For his actions, Tom Custer would eventually be awarded a Medal of Honor, one of two he would earn within four days.

Barringer's Confederate cavalry had bought enough time for Bushrod Johnson's infantry division to pass nearby Namozine Church around 8:00 a.m. Unfortunately for Johnson, his forces took a wrong turn at a fork in the road and had to halt when his command reached a bridge over Deep Creek that was underwater from recent flooding. Although the Union cavalry drove off the Confederate cavalry, the North Carolina cavalry regiments had secured the Namozine Church road intersection long enough for Johnson to return and take the correct fork. When General Johnson approached with his infantry division, Custer's forces were forced to retire, allowing the Confederate forces to proceed across Deep Creek, an Appomattox River tributary. Then, Fitzhugh Lee and his cousin, "Rooney" Lee, second son of Gen. Robert E. Lee, separated their cavalry commands and continued their retreat. Custer later chased the fleeing Confederates but near dark he ran into substantial infantry opposition from Johnson's division at Sweathouse Creek and halted for the night. After dark, however, Wells' brigade continued to attack Fitzhugh Lee's force along Deep Creek. Brig. Gen. Barringer and many of his men were captured by Sheridan's scouts, who were wearing gray uniforms and led Barringer and his remaining men into a trap. Rooney Lee's adjutant general, Maj. J. D. Ferguson, also was captured. Sheridan's forces camped for the night along the road from Namozine Church to Deep Creek while the Confederate infantry and remaining cavalry continued to march to their designated consolidation point of Amelia Court House, where they expected to receive much-needed supplies and rations.

Colonel Wells (Note: Colonel William Wells was appointed a full rank brigadier general of volunteers on May 19, 1865. Warner, Ezra J. Generals in Blue: Lives of the Union Commanders. Baton Rouge: Louisiana State University Press, 1964. ISBN 0-8071-0822-7. p. 550.) lost 95 Federal cavalrymen killed and wounded in the engagement. Total Confederate losses are not known, but Custer's men were able to capture many of the Confederates. They took 350 prisoners, 100 horses and an artillery piece while initially clearing the road as far as the Namozine Church. Johnson reported 15 wounded from his division. After the battle, Namozine Church served as a field hospital and later as Maj. Gen. Sheridan's temporary headquarters.

== Aftermath ==
On April 4, 1865, the opposing forces skirmished at Tabernacle Church or Beaver Pond Creek and at Amelia Court House. Meanwhile, Sheridan's forces occupied Jetersville, Virginia, and Burkeville, Virginia, blocking Lee's access to the Richmond and Danville Railroad and to the direct route southwestward. Lee had hoped to find a supply train at Amelia Court House, Virginia, 39 miles (63 km) southwest of Richmond, but when he and his forces arrived there on April 4, 1865, he found that the train contained only ordnance, ammunition, caissons and harnesses. After a delay for unsuccessful foraging efforts, or as some historians have argued, primarily because of the delay in bringing up a pontoon bridge needed to cross rain-swollen rivers, Lee had to order his hungry men to resume their march in the hope that they could find rations at Farmville, Virginia.

On April 5, 1865, Sheridan ordered Crook to send cavalry patrols north of Jetersville to reconnoiter his left flank. Between 4 miles (6.4 km) and 7 miles (11 km) out of Jetersville, Union Brig. Gen. Henry E. Davies Jr. attacked and destroyed about 200 wagons of a Confederate army wagon train and took at least 300 prisoners. Confederate cavalry engaged Davies' rear guard in a running combat through Amelia Springs but Davies' force linked up with reinforcements near Jetersville, permitting Davies to limit his losses and keep his prisoners.

On the morning of April 6, Meade thought that the Confederate army remained concentrated at Amelia Court House and, despite the suspicions of Grant and Sheridan that the Confederates had moved on, Meade sent the Army of the Potomac infantry in the direction of Amelia Court House on that morning. The Union forces soon discovered that Lee had started moving west and changed their direction of march to continue their pursuit. In the afternoon of April 6, 1865, approximately one-fifth (Note: Kinzer, Charles E. "Battle of Sayler's Creek/Harper's Farm." In Encyclopedia of the American Civil War: A Political, Social, and Military History, edited by David S. Heidler and Jeanne T. Heidler. New York: W. W. Norton & Company, 2000. ISBN 978-0-393-04758-5. p. 1709. Some writers have said the number of Confederates killed and captured by Union forces at Sailor's Creek may have been nearly one-third of Lee's remaining effective soldiers although one-fifth to one-quarter of the remaining force is the range usually stated.) of the remaining soldiers of the Army of Northern Virginia were cut off from the main body of Confederate troops at the Battle of Sayler's Creek (or Battle of Sailor's Creek) and killed or (mainly) captured. The killed and captured were about 8,000 men, including Lt. Gen. Richard S. Ewell and eight other generals. This in turn was about one-sixth of the number of men who had left Richmond and Petersburg with Lee's forces.

After about five more small engagements over the next three days, with the Army of Northern Virginia melting away and Union forces surrounding them, Lee surrendered his army to Grant on April 9, 1865, at Appomattox Court House, Virginia, about 90 miles (140 km) west of Richmond.

== Battlefield today ==
The battlefield retains good integrity, although the area is more wooded today. Namozine Presbyterian Church still exists (Note: March 2015.) and is owned by the Amelia County Historical Society.
