= Truxillo, Virginia =

Unincorporated community in Virginia, United States

Coordinates: 37°22′16″N 78°02′30″W

Truxillo is an unincorporated community located in Amelia County, in the U.S. state of Virginia, located at the intersections of SR 681 (Pridesville and Clementown Roads) and SR 639 (Mt. Zion Road). The community was a post village in the 1900s.
