= Wellville, Virginia =

Unincorporated community in Virginia, United States

- Unincorporated community
- Location within Virginia Location within the United States
- Coordinates: 37°7′39″N 77°55′15″W
- Country: United States
- State: Virginia
- County: Nottoway
- Elevation: 413 ft (126 m)
- Time zone: UTC−5 (Eastern (EST))
  - Summer (DST): UTC−4 (EDT)
- GNIS feature ID: 1477867

Wellville is a rural unincorporated community in Nottoway County, in the U.S. state of Virginia. In the mid-nineteenth century, the town was a stop on the Southside Railroad, which became the Atlantic, Mississippi and Ohio Railroad in 1870 and then a line in the Norfolk and Western Railway. It is now the Norfolk Southern Railway.

Namozine Creek has its source just northeast.
