= Barrett–Chumney House =

Historic house in Virginia, United States

- U.S. National Register of Historic Places
- Virginia Landmarks Register
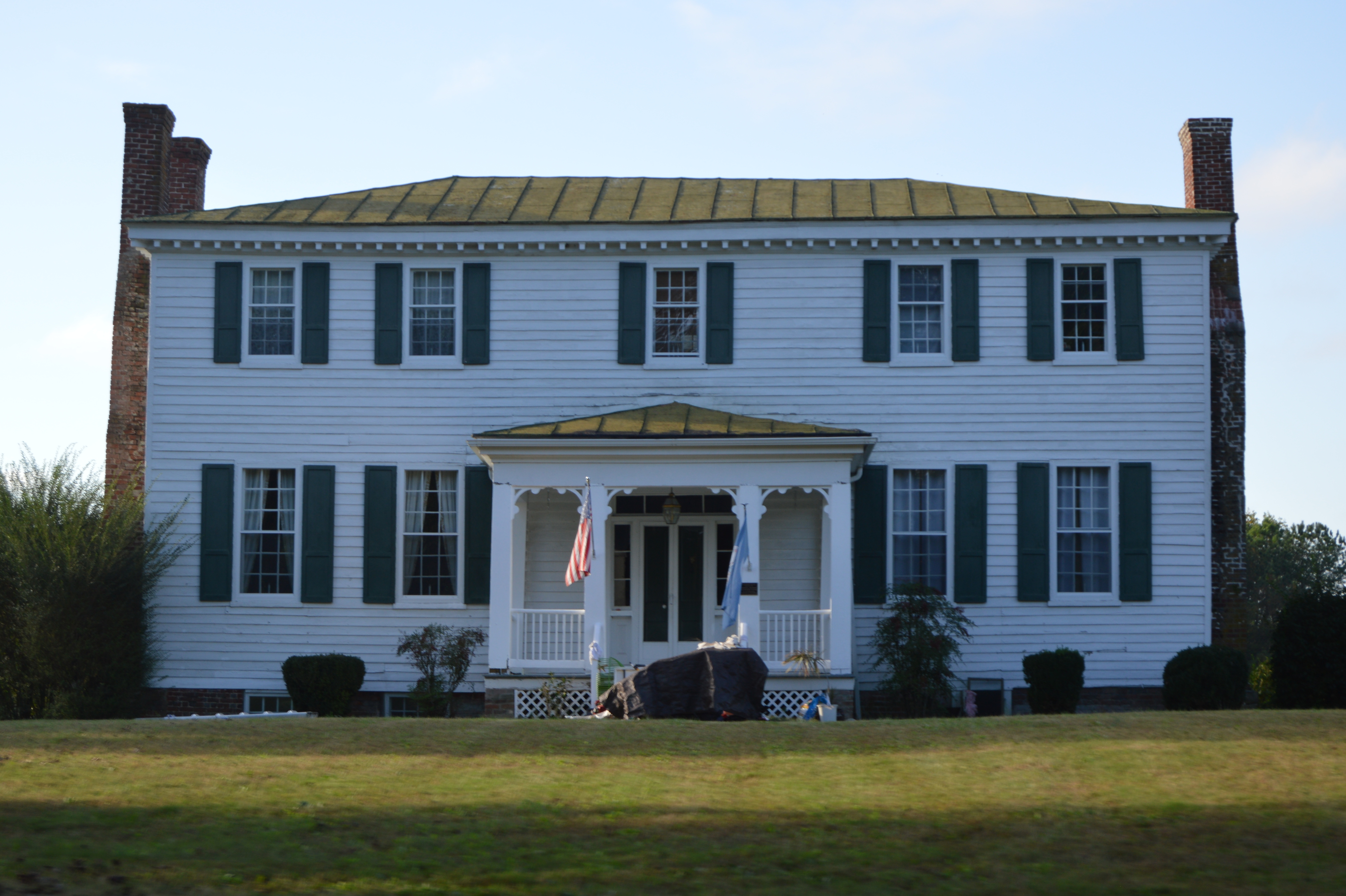
- Front of the house

- Location within Virginia Location within the United States
- Location: 2400 Richmond Rd., near Mannboro, Virginia
- Coordinates: 37°13′43″N 77°50′41″W
- Area: 13.4 acres (5.4 ha)
- Built: c. 1823, c. 1859
- Architectural style: Federal, Greek Revival
- NRHP reference No.: 11000832
- VLR No.: 004-5017

Significant dates
- Added to NRHP: November 18, 2011
- Designated VLR: September 22, 2011

Barrett–Chumney House is a historic plantation house near Amelia Court House, Amelia County, in the U.S. state of Virginia. The house was largely built about 1823, and is a two-story, five-bay frame central-hall building with weatherboarded exterior and hipped standing-seam metal roof. It is a Federal-style I-house with a notable Federal-style door surround. The house was remodeled in about 1859, with the addition of Greek Revival elements. Also on the property are a contributing tobacco barn, two sheds, and a carriage house/garage.

It was added to the National Register of Historic Places in 2011. It is also on the Virginia Department of Historic Resources list of historic African American sites in Virginia.
