= Fieldstown, Virginia =

Unincorporated community in Virginia, United States

Coordinates: 37°23′08″N 77°56′50″W

Fieldstown is an unincorporated community located in Amelia County, in the U.S. state of Virginia. St. John's Church is among one of many National Register of Historic Places listings located near Fieldstown.
