= Mattoax, Virginia =

Unincorporated community in Virginia, United States

Coordinates: 37°25′38″N 77°52′21″W

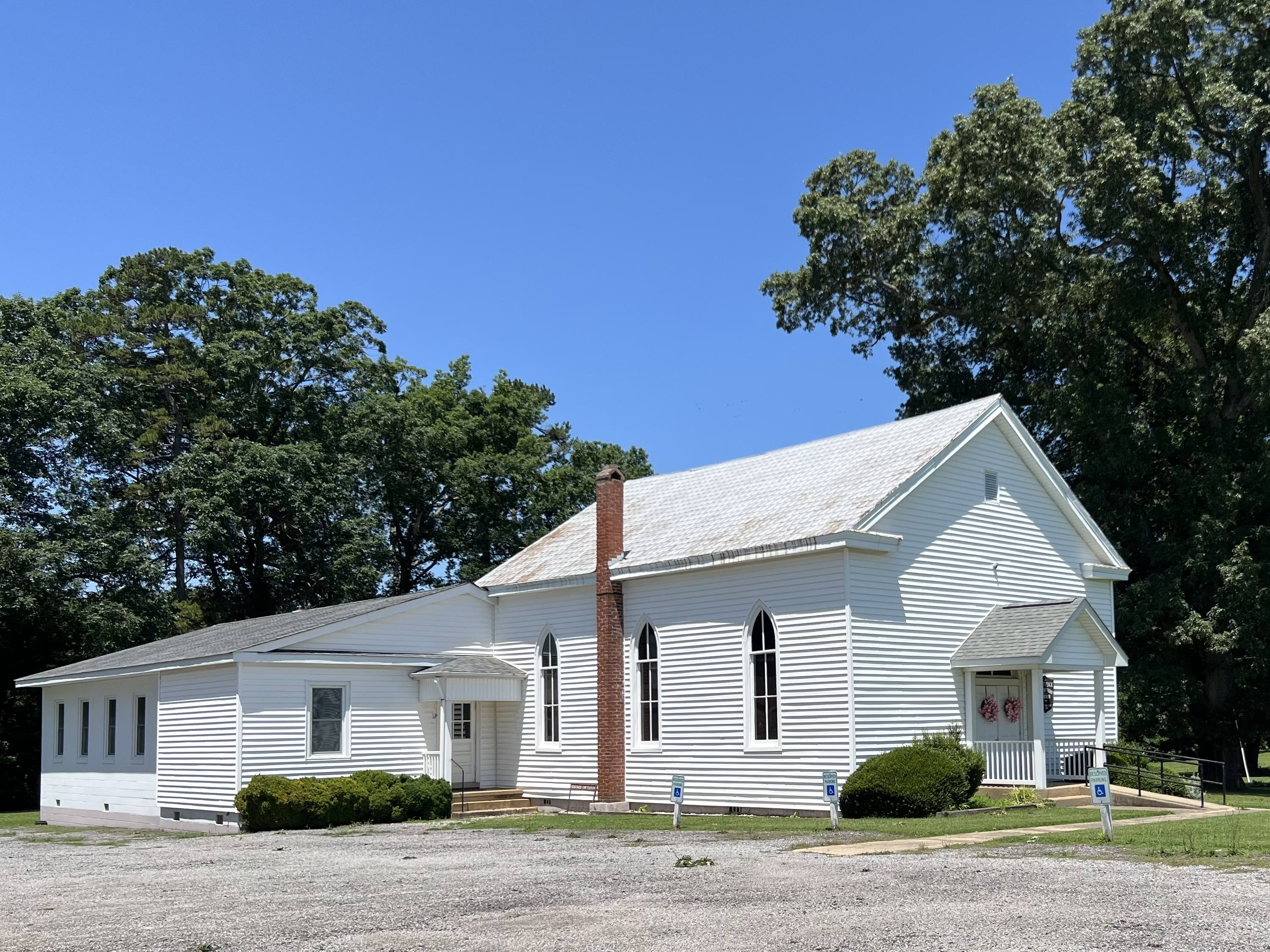
Mattoax Presbyterian Church.

Mattoax (/məˈtoʊəks/; mə-TOE-əks) is an unincorporated community in northeastern Amelia County in the U.S. state of Virginia. Originally it was located on the right bank of the Appomattox River.

Beginning in 1851, the town had its own post office, listed as "Appomattox Depot" or "Appomattox River" at first. The name "Mattoax Depot" appeared as early as 1852, and in 1855 the post office was renamed to match, with the spelling "Matoax" as a common variant. Mattoax was also a stop, at Milepost 26.8, along the former Richmond & Danville Railroad, later the Southern Railway. The Mattoax post office was listed in gazetteers at least as late as 1922; both it and the train station, however, have since been demolished.
