= Otterburn, Virginia =

Unincorporated community in Virginia, United States

Coordinates: 37°20′21″N 77°59′54″W

Otterburn is an unincorporated community located in Amelia County, in the U.S. state of Virginia. It is located just south of Amelia Court House, Virginia and was a stop on the Richmond and Danville Railroad.
