= Amelia Academy =

Coordinates: 37°19′51″N 77°59′4″W

- 8741 N Five Forks Rd, Amelia Courthouse

Information
- Type: Private
- Established: 1964
- Principal: Chris Hooper
- Grades: K-12
- Enrollment: 150
- Campus: Rural
- Colors: Navy, maroon
- Athletics conference: Virginia Independent Schools Athletic Association, Virginia Commonwealth Conference
- Mascot: Patriots
- Website: Amelia Academy

Amelia Academy is a private school in Amelia, Virginia that was founded in 1964 as a segregation academy.

== History ==
Amelia Academy was founded in 1964 during Virginia's policy of massive resistance to court-mandated integration of public schools. At this time most of the white students in Amelia County transferred to the new Amelia Academy in order to avoid contact with Black stidents.

Amelia Academy's tax-exempt status was suspended by the Internal Revenue Service in the early 1970s due to its racially discriminatory admission policies.

Amelia Academy briefly regained its tax-exempt status in 1985. However, in February 1986 the Internal Revenue Service announced that it was opening an investigation to determine whether Amelia Academy and two other Virginia private schools had in fact abandoned racial discrimination in admissions. In April 1986 the IRS announced that both the Amelia Academy and the Isle of Wight Academy would have their tax exemptions revoked.

As of 1988, no Black student had ever attended the school. In May of that year, headmistress Dallas De K. Lewis told the Richmond Times-Dispatch that "We have an open-door policy. We'd be delighted if we could get some other races."

During the 1993 Virginia gubernatorial campaign Republican candidates George Allen and Michael Farris attended a picnic at the school. Both men later denied knowing that the event was a fundraiser for the school, that the school had been founded as a segregation academy, and that the student body at the time was all white. At the time, the headmistress told The Washington Post that the Academy "has always had an open-door policy," and that anyone who met admissions standards was welcome to attend. She also noted that the school had not yet regained its tax-exempt status from the IRS, and recalled that, although the Academy had had a Korean student during the IRS investigation, the investigator noted that "we may have met the letter of the law but because we had no blacks, we didn't meet the spirit of the law." Peter Eliades, unsuccessful Virginia Democratic candidate for the U.S. House of Representatives, also attended the event. His campaign manager told the Times-Dispatch "I had absolutely no idea there was any connection...with a segregation academy. If there is a connection, we are appalled. We condemn any kind of discrimination."

== Demographics ==
According to a ProPublica article, as of the 2022 school year, the school had a student body of 127, 94.5% of whom were white while the Amelia County Public Schools had a population of 1,635, 67% of whom were white. The NCES reported in the 2024 school year that the student body was 100% white.
