= Tornado outbreak of April 29–30, 1924 =

Weather event in the United States

April 1924 tornado outbreak
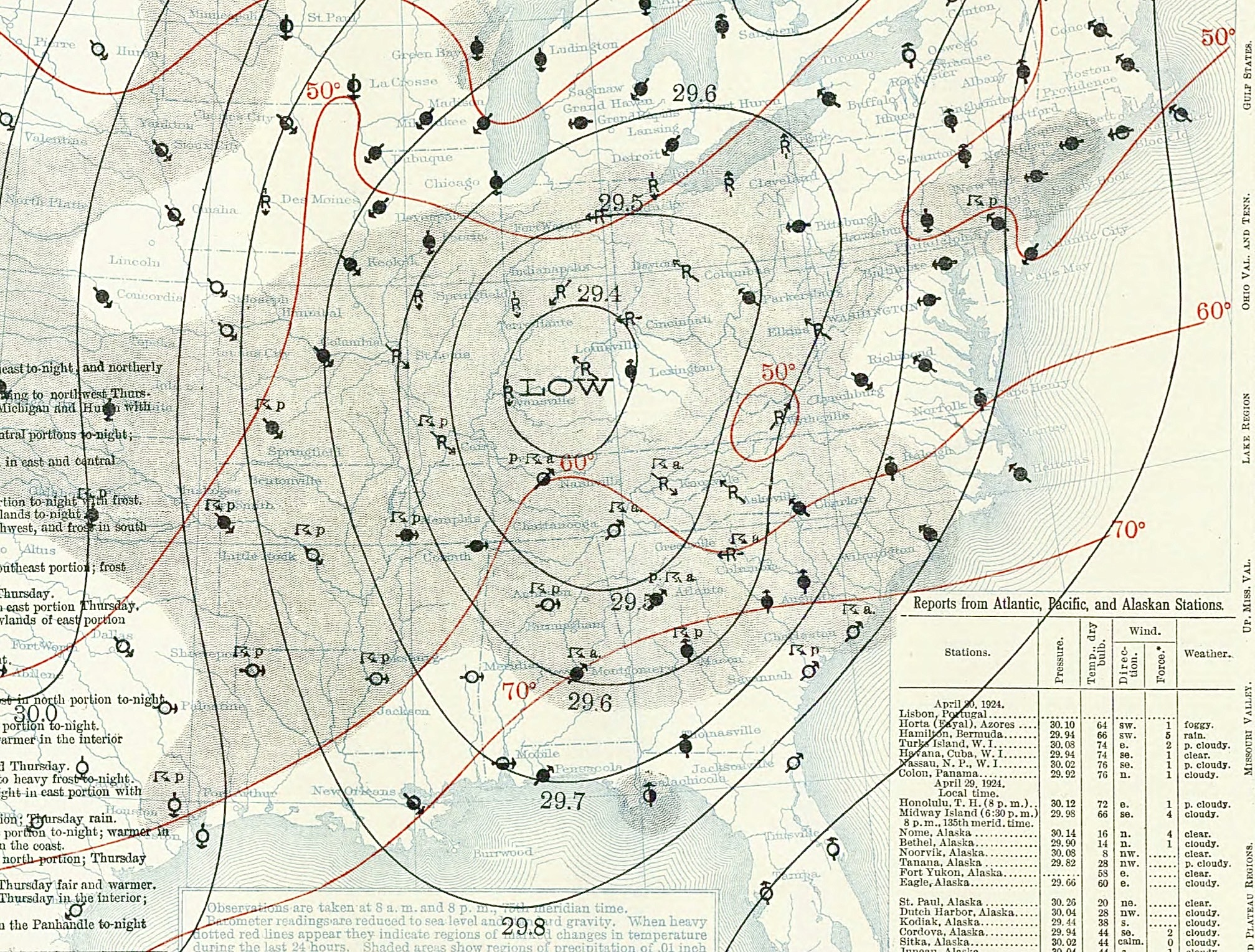
- Surface weather analysis on April 30

Meteorological history
- Date: April 29–30, 1924

Tornado outbreak
- Tornadoes: ≥28
- Max. rating: F4 tornado

Overall effects
- Casualties: 114 fatalities, ≥1,166 injuries
- Damage: Unknown (Note: All losses are in 1924 USD unless otherwise noted.)
- Areas affected: Southern United States

On April 29–30, 1924, an outbreak of at least 28 tornadoes—26 of which were significant, meaning F2 or stronger—affected the Southern United States. (Note: The Fujita scale was devised under the aegis of scientist T. Theodore Fujita in the early 1970s. Prior to the advent of the scale in 1971, tornadoes in the United States were officially unrated. While the Fujita scale has been superseded by the Enhanced Fujita scale in the U.S. since February 1, 2007, Canada utilized the old scale until April 1, 2013; nations elsewhere, like the United Kingdom, apply other classifications such as the TORRO scale.) (Note: Historically, the number of tornadoes globally and in the United States was and is likely underrepresented: research by Grazulis on annual tornado activity suggests that, as of 2001, only 53% of yearly U.S. tornadoes were officially recorded. Documentation of tornadoes outside the United States was historically less exhaustive, owing to the lack of monitors in many nations and, in some cases, to internal political controls on public information. Most countries only recorded tornadoes that produced severe damage or loss of life. Significant low biases in U.S. tornado counts likely occurred through the early 1990s, when advanced NEXRAD was first installed and the National Weather Service began comprehensively verifying tornado occurrences.) The tornadoes left 114 dead and at least 1,166 injured, mostly in the Carolinas, with 76 deaths in South Carolina alone, along with 16 in Georgia and 13 in Alabama. Killer tornadoes touched down from Oklahoma and Arkansas to Virginia. The deadliest tornado of the outbreak was a long-lived tornado family that produced F4 damage in rural portions of South Carolina, killing 53 people and injuring at least 534. The tornado is the deadliest ever recorded in South Carolina and is one of the longest-tracked observed in the state, having traveled 105 miles (169 km); some sources list a total path length of 135 mi (217 km), including the segment in Florence County, but this is now believed to have been a separate, F3 tornado.

== Confirmed tornadoes ==
Confirmed tornadoes by Fujita rating
FU	F0	F1	F2	F3	F4	F5	Total
2	?	?	13	11	2	0	≥28

=== April 29 event ===
Confirmed tornadoes – Tuesday, April 29, 1924 (Note: All dates are based on the local time zone where the tornado touched down; however, all times are in Coordinated Universal Time and dates are split at midnight CST/CDT for consistency.) (Note: Prior to 1994, only the average widths of tornado paths were officially listed.)
F#	Location	County / Parish	State	Time (UTC)	Path length	Max. width	Summary
F2	SE of Ingalls	Payne	OK	10:00–?	2 miles (3.2 km)	100 yards (91 m)	1 death – Three homes were destroyed. Other damage from downbursts totaled $200,000 in the area. Three people were injured.
F2	N of Texarkana	Miller	AR	20:30–?	0.5 miles (0.80 km)	100 yards (91 m)	1 death – Eight homes were destroyed. 17 people were injured and losses totaled $25,000.
F3	Crichton	Red River	LA	23:30–?	0.5 miles (0.80 km)	50 yards (46 m)	Four homes were damaged or destroyed. Five people were injured.
F2	Many	Sabine	LA	00:30–?	1 mile (1.6 km)	800 yards (730 m)	1 death – Numerous trees, concessions, a depot, and homes were badly damaged. Eight people were injured and losses totaled $100,000.

=== April 30 event ===
Confirmed tornadoes – Wednesday, April 30, 1924
F#	Location	County / Parish	State	Time (UTC)	Path length	Max. width	Summary
F2	Autaugaville	Autauga	AL	08:45–?	1 mile (1.6 km)	Unknown	Tornado tore off roofs and leveled a church. Outside town, the tornado destroyed tenant homes and a barn. Nine people were injured and losses totaled $30,000.
F2	S of Roanoke	Chambers, Randolph	AL	10:30–?	10 miles (16 km)	100 yards (91 m)	1 death – Tornado destroyed small homes and "one of the finest homes in the county", killing one person. Another individual was carried 400 yd (370 m) distant and severely injured. In all, six people were injured and losses totaled $25,000.
F3	Greenville	Butler	AL	10:50–?	1 mile (1.6 km)	100 yards (91 m)	1 death – Tornado leveled well-built homes and ripped off roofs. Ten people were injured and losses totaled $80,000.
F2	SE of Auburn to NE of Opelika	Lee	AL	11:00–?	15 miles (24 km)	400 yards (370 m)	4 deaths – Tornado affected six farms near Auburn, destroying rural buildings. Tornado then struck the northern side of Opelika, leveling approximately 12 small homes. Three people died in the area as onlookers in downtown Opelika observed the tornado. The tornado killed one more person in a rural tenant home before dissipating. 25 people were injured and losses totaled $20,000.
FU	Albany	Dougherty	GA	11:00–?	Unknown	Unknown	Only trees were damaged.
F2	Lawrenceville	Gwinnett	GA	11:00–?	5 miles (8.0 km)	Unknown	1 death – Tornado touched down near and paralleled the railroad tracks as it moved into town, killing a person whose home was crushed beneath trees. Tornado caused $200,000 in damage, at least $75,000 of which occurred at two mills. 26 homes, many businesses, and several industrial buildings were destroyed or unroofed. 10 people were injured.
F2	Warm Springs to Greenville	Meriwether	GA	11:15–?	6 miles (9.7 km)	Unknown	1 death – 10 tenant homes were destroyed. Eight people were injured and losses totaled $8,000.
F3	Thompson to N of Hannon	Bullock, Macon	AL	11:50–?	23 miles (37 km)	250 yards (230 m)	6 deaths – Devastating tornado destroyed community of Thompson. 20 structures were leveled and six deaths occurred in the community. One of the dead was carried 1 mi (1.6 km) away. 20 people were injured and losses totaled $80,000.
F3	NW of Hartwell, GA to Anderson, SC to Walnut Grove, SC	Hart (GA), Anderson (SC), Greenville (SC), Laurens (SC), Spartanburg (SC)	GA, SC	12:15–?	65 miles (105 km)	400 yards (370 m)	9 deaths – See section on this tornado
F2	E of Tarentum to SE of Louisville	Pike, Barbour	AL	12:30–?	27 miles (43 km)	200 yards (180 m)	1 death – Tornado destroyed several barns and small homes, including tenant homes, in rural areas. Many mules died in the path. 40 people were injured and losses totaled $65,000.
F3	S of Pine Mountain	Harris	GA	13:30–?	8 miles (13 km)	200 yards (180 m)	10 deaths – Destructive tornado killed seven people in rural areas and three more near Pine Mountain. 35 people were injured and losses totaled $40,000.
F3	S of Reynolds	Taylor, Crawford	GA	13:30–?	5 miles (8.0 km)	Unknown	Possible family of tornadoes destroyed tenant homes and other structures on plantations before dissipating in the swamps near the Flint River. 30 people were injured and losses totaled $30,000.
F2	Brookton to Cornelia	Hall, Habersham	GA	14:00–?	15 miles (24 km)	Unknown	Tornado struck 50 homes as it skipped along, damaging roofs, porches, and walls. Four people were injured and losses totaled $50,000.
F2	Fitzgerald	Ben Hill	GA	14:45–?	Unknown	Unknown	Tornado destroyed, unroofed, or otherwise damaged 14 homes, two of which were large. Some of the homes shifted on their foundations. Three people were injured and losses totaled $100,000.
F4	Macon	Bibb	GA	14:45–?	6 miles (9.7 km)	300 yards (270 m)	3 deaths – Tornado leveled and swept away a couple of homes as it passed through southern Macon. Most of the damage occurred at a brickyard, but all deaths were reported in rural areas. Tornado was rated as a "minimal" F4 due to poor construction. 40 people were injured and losses totaled $200,000.
F2	Ficklin	Wilkes	GA	14:45–?	2 miles (3.2 km)	100 yards (91 m)	1 death – Tornado struck a combined post office and small store, killing the postmaster inside. The frail structure was built of corrugated metal and disintegrated; the body of the postmaster was carried 300 yd (270 m). The tornado also leveled three nearby stores. One large home lost its roof and slipped on its foundation. 10 people were injured and losses totaled $25,000.
F4	NE of Aiken to Horrell Hill to N of Timmonsville	Aiken, Lexington, Richland, Sumter, Lee, Darlington	SC	16:00–?	105 miles (169 km)	600 yards (550 m)	53 deaths – See section on this tornado
F3	N of Pittsboro	Chatham	NC	17:30–?	2 miles (3.2 km)	150 yards (140 m)	4 deaths – Tornado swept away a small home and destroyed a sawmill, killing a family of four people who sheltered in the latter. Nearby homes were reportedly "leveled" as well. Five people were injured and losses totaled $20,000.
F2	Sylvania	Screven	GA	17:45–?	Unknown	Unknown	Tornado leveled several barns.
F3	SW of Robersonville	Pitt, Martin, Bertie	NC	19:30–?	18 miles (29 km)	300 yards (270 m)	1 death – Tornado destroyed 60 structures, some of which were large homes, and killed one person before ending near the Roanoke River. 40 people were injured and losses totaled $200,000.
F3	N of Effingham	Sumter, Florence	SC	19:45–?	25 miles (40 km)	200 yards (180 m)	14 deaths – Tornado formed from the same thunderstorm as the Horrell Hill F4. Passed between Lynchburg and Sardis, greatly intensifying as it passed into Florence County; thence, it "cut a devastating swath" through the county before dissipating near Pamplico. 144 people were injured.
FU	Pleasant Shade	Greensville	VA	22:30–?	Unknown	40 yards (37 m)	Very brief tornado destroyed only one structure.
F3	SE of Jetersville to S of Chula	Amelia	VA	22:30–?	10 miles (16 km)	100 yards (91 m)	1 death – Tornado leveled a barn and seven homes. Seven people were injured and losses totaled $30,000.
F3	Ellenton	Colquitt	GA	Unknown	Unknown	Unknown	A tornado destroyed several homes near Ellenton, one of which was completely leveled except for its central hallway. A family had taken shelter there and was uninjured.

=== Hartwell, Georgia/Anderson–Walnut Grove, South Carolina ===
Hartwell, Georgia/Anderson–Walnut Grove, South Carolina
F3 tornado
- on the Fujita scale

Overall effects
- Casualties: 9 fatalities, 150 injuries
- Damage: $2 million (1924 USD) $37.6 million (2025 USD)

A destructive tornado family known as the "Anderson Tornado" first touched down across the Georgia–South Carolina border near Hartwell, affecting property in rural areas. The tornado crossed into South Carolina, but did not produce significant damage at first. Once it reached a point about 2 mi (3.2 km) southwest of Anderson, however, it strengthened substantially. It struck the "Masters" or "Masters Store" community, leveling a shop and several other, littler structures nearby. Severe damage began just east of McDuffie Street as the tornado continued to intensify. It razed several well-built homes along East River Street, where more than half of the nine deaths occurred. In Anderson alone, the tornado ruined about 100 little homes, two cotton mills, and many businesses, with losses of about $1.5 million. All nine deaths occurred in Anderson, where about 100 people were injured and roughly 600 were left homeless. Outside Anderson, the tornado flattened a grove of trees and severely damaged a home before dissipating. It was called the worst to hit Anderson County since an F3 tornado hit the area on February 19, 1884. Afterward, the tornado probably reformed into another or more tornadoes before striking northern Laurens County and Walnut Grove in Spartanburg County. At Walnut Grove, 13 mi (21 km) south of Spartanburg, the tornado leveled 14 homes and injured 21 people. After striking Walnut Grove, the tornado widened into a downburst, 1,300 yd (1,200 m; 1.2 km) wide, near Glenn Springs. Total losses from the tornado reached $2 million.

=== Steedman–Horrell Hill–Gaillard Crossroads, South Carolina ===
Steedman–Horrell Hill–Gaillard Crossroads, South Carolina
F4 tornado
- on the Fujita scale

Overall effects
- Casualties: 53 fatalities, 534 injuries
- Damage: $1 million (1924 USD) $18.8 million (2025 USD)

This catastrophic, extremely violent, long-lived tornado likely consisted of two or more tornadoes. It first touched down roughly 11 mi (18 km) northeast of Aiken and remained on the ground almost unceasingly until it entered southern Lee County. The tornado passed near Edmund and traversed the Congaree River approximately 9 mi (14 km) south of Columbia, which reported its most destructive incident, at the time, of large hail on record. Near Adams Pond, south of Columbia, the tornado, described as being "blue-black" and "of great proportions", was 1,400 yd (1,300 m; 1.3 km) wide. The tornado killed eight people in its path across Lexington County, three of whom—a pair of students and a teacher—died in a school at Steedman. Near "Lykesland", southeast of Columbia, the tornado contracted to 1,000 yd (910 m) in width as it approached Horrell Hill. About 2 mi (3.2 km) southwest of Horrell Hill, the tornado may have produced its worst damage as it narrowed to just 500 yd (460 m) in width. It then veered abruptly to the southeast before turning north, followed by another turn to the east—one of many irregular changes in direction suggesting the formation of a new tornado. 12 people died in and near Horrell Hill, including four people in a school "filled with children." In all, the tornado killed 24 people in Richland County. After passing near Horrell Hill, the tornado bent to the northeast before crossing the Wateree River into Sumter County. It then re-intensified, causing 20 more deaths in Sumter County as it leveled rural homes, especially near Gaillard Crossroads. The tornado killed one more person in Lee County, after which its path became intermittent once more. After killing 53 people, injuring 534, and leveling more than 1,300 structures—most of which were insubstantial in size—the tornado finally dissipated 5 mi (8.0 km) north of Timmonsville.

== See also ==
- List of tornadoes and tornado outbreaks
  - List of North American tornadoes and tornado outbreaks
- 1984 Carolinas tornado outbreak – Devastating, violent tornado outbreak in the Carolinas
- 2020 Easter tornado outbreak – Generated more intense tornadoes in South Carolina than any other 24–hour event
- April 1957 Southeastern United States tornado outbreak – Produced long-tracked tornado families in the Carolinas
- Enigma tornado outbreak – Potentially one of the largest outbreaks on record in the Southeastern United States
