= Ford, Virginia =

Unincorporated community in Virginia, United States

- Unincorporated community
- Location within Virginia Location within the United States
- Coordinates: 37°08′58″N 77°44′08″W
- Country: United States
- State: Virginia
- County: Dinwiddie
- Elevation: 308 ft (94 m)
- Time zone: UTC-5 (Eastern (EST))
  - Summer (DST): UTC-4 (EDT)
- ZIP code: 23850
- Area code: 804
- GNIS feature ID: 1466754

Ford is an unincorporated community in Dinwiddie County, Virginia, United States. Ford is located on U.S. Route 460, 19.2 miles (30.9 km) west-southwest of Petersburg. This town was a stop on the Southside Railroad in the mid-nineteenth Century. This became the Atlantic, Mississippi and Ohio Railroad in 1870 and then a line in the Norfolk and Western Railway and now the Norfolk Southern Railway.

Ford has a post office with ZIP code 23850.
