= Lake Chesdin =

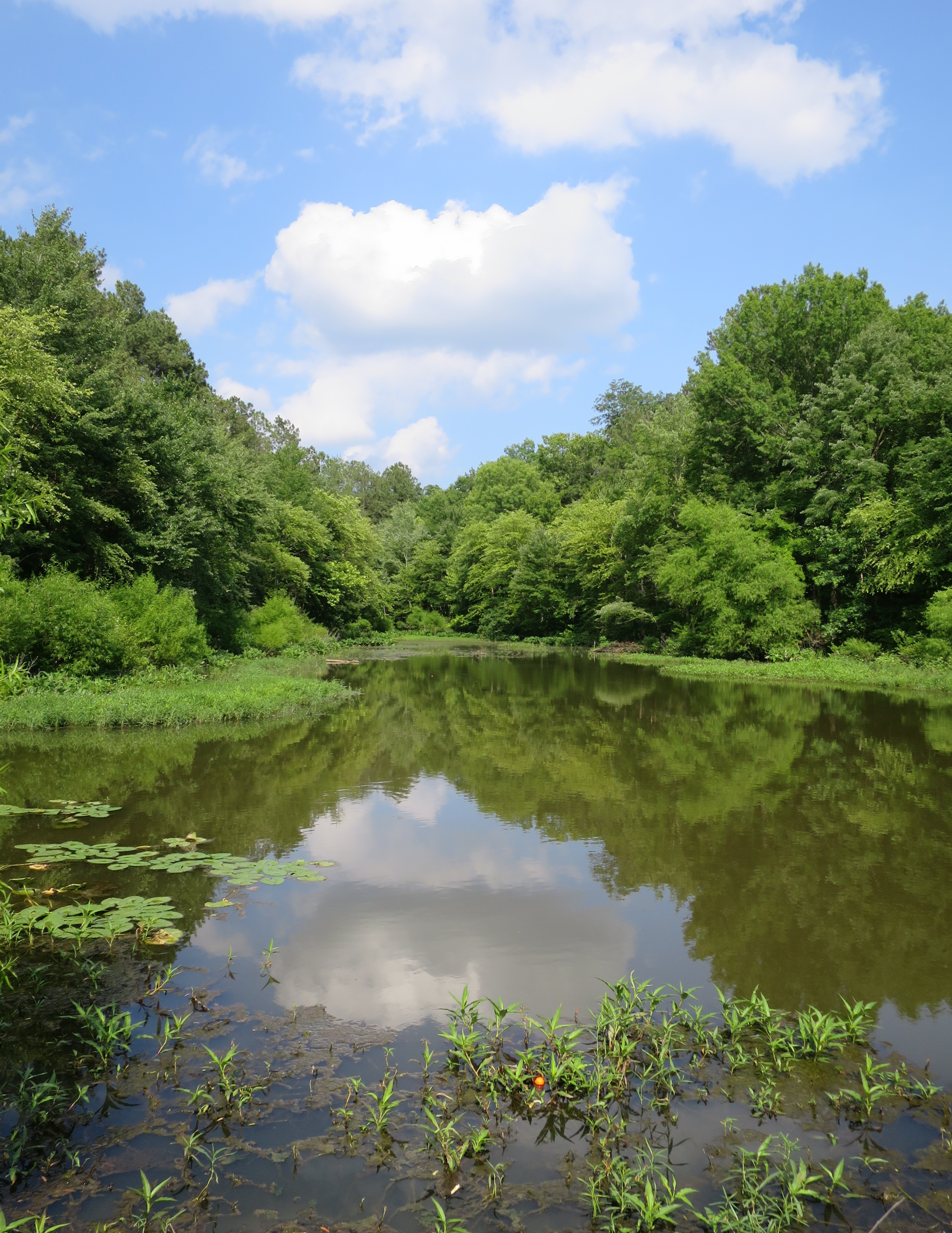
- Cove at edge of Lake Chesdin

- Location within Virginia Location within the United States
- Location: Chesterfield / Dinwiddie / Amelia counties, Virginia, US
- Coordinates: 37°13′14″N 77°31′30″W
- Type: Reservoir
- Basin countries: United States
- Surface area: 3,100 acres (13 km^{2})
- Surface elevation: 108 ft (33 m)

Lake Chesdin (also known as Chesdin Reservoir) is a lake in south-central Virginia, on the border of Chesterfield County and Dinwiddie County and going upstream into Amelia County. It provides water and power to the region. It is also a popular fishing area and is known to have great opportunities for largemouth bass. It is also known to have populations of crappie, bluegill, walleye, striped bass, channel catfish, gizzard shad and white perch.

== Location ==
The dam and the reservoir are located in the Appomattox watershed at the political boundary of Chesterfield, Amelia, and Dinwiddie Counties. The boundary between Chesterfield and Dinwiddie Counties divides the dam and the reservoir into two almost equal halves. The crest of the dam is about 840 feet long, and the reservoir has a drainage area of about 1,333 square miles.

== History ==
Lake Chesdin Reservoir was created in 1968 by construction of the George F. Brasfield Dam on the Appomattox River. Lake Chesdin was built to supply water to Dinwiddie, Prince George and Chesterfield counties, along with the cities of Colonial Heights and Petersburg. In the fall of 1960, these five municipal governments in the Petersburg tri-cities area came together to pass an ordinance establishing the Appomattox River Water Authority (ARWA). Once the dam project was completed in 1967, the river's flow filled the pool behind it to create Lake Chesdin.

== Regional importance ==
The dam is overseen by the ARWA. Based on the last yield study, the total storage volume of Lake Chesdin was 9.66 billion gallons (BG), with a safe yield of approximately 41.3 million gallons per day (mgd). To provide a municipal water supply, the city of Petersburg purchases water from ARWA. Since Lake Chesdin was built in the late 1960s, silt buildup on its bottom has reduced the amount of water the lake can hold by 1.5 billion gallons. In addition, a run-of-river hydroelectric facility is located at the dam, which provides power generation whenever the flow over the spillway exceeds 150 cfs, or 1 1/4-inch flow depth.

== Fishing ==
=== Largemouth bass ===
Lake Chesdin is known as an excellent fishery for largemouth bass. It has some that are over 20 inches (50 cm) long.

=== Crappie ===
Lake Chesdin is home to both varieties of crappie found in Virginia. Though the crappie population has been declining, due to increased competition for food with white perch, some exceed 10 inches (30 cm). The lake record was caught April 19, 2001. It weighed 4 lb (1.8 kg) and measured 18 1/2 inches. The angler was David Collins of DeWitt, Virginia.

=== Bluegill ===
Bluegill are also commonly found in Lake Chesdin. Due to competition for food from other species, few exceed 7 inches (20 cm).

=== Walleye ===
Though walleye are not stocked often in Lake Chesdin, it has some up to and exceeding 7 lb (3 kg).

=== Striped bass ===
One of Lake Chesdin's most notable species of fish is the striped bass, with some reaching 25 lb (11 kg). They are regularly stocked.

=== Channel catfish ===
Lake Chesdin has a great population of channel catfish. These catfish can be found in abundance in the lake, and range from 2 to 6 lb.

=== White perch ===
White perch are one of the most numerous fish in the lake. They can reach up to 10 inches (30 cm).
