= Church Road, Virginia =

Unincorporated community in Virginia, United States

- Unincorporated community
- Location within Virginia Location within the United States
- Coordinates: 37°10′59″N 77°38′18″W
- Country: United States
- State: Virginia
- County: Dinwiddie
- Elevation: 302 ft (92 m)
- Time zone: UTC-5 (Eastern (EST))
  - Summer (DST): UTC-4 (EDT)
- ZIP code: 23833
- Area code: 804
- GNIS feature ID: 1464917

Church Road is an unincorporated community in Dinwiddie County, Virginia, United States. Church Road is 13.5 miles (21.7 km) west-southwest of Petersburg. Church Road has a post office with ZIP code 23833.
