= Amelia County, Virginia =

County in Virginia, United States

- County
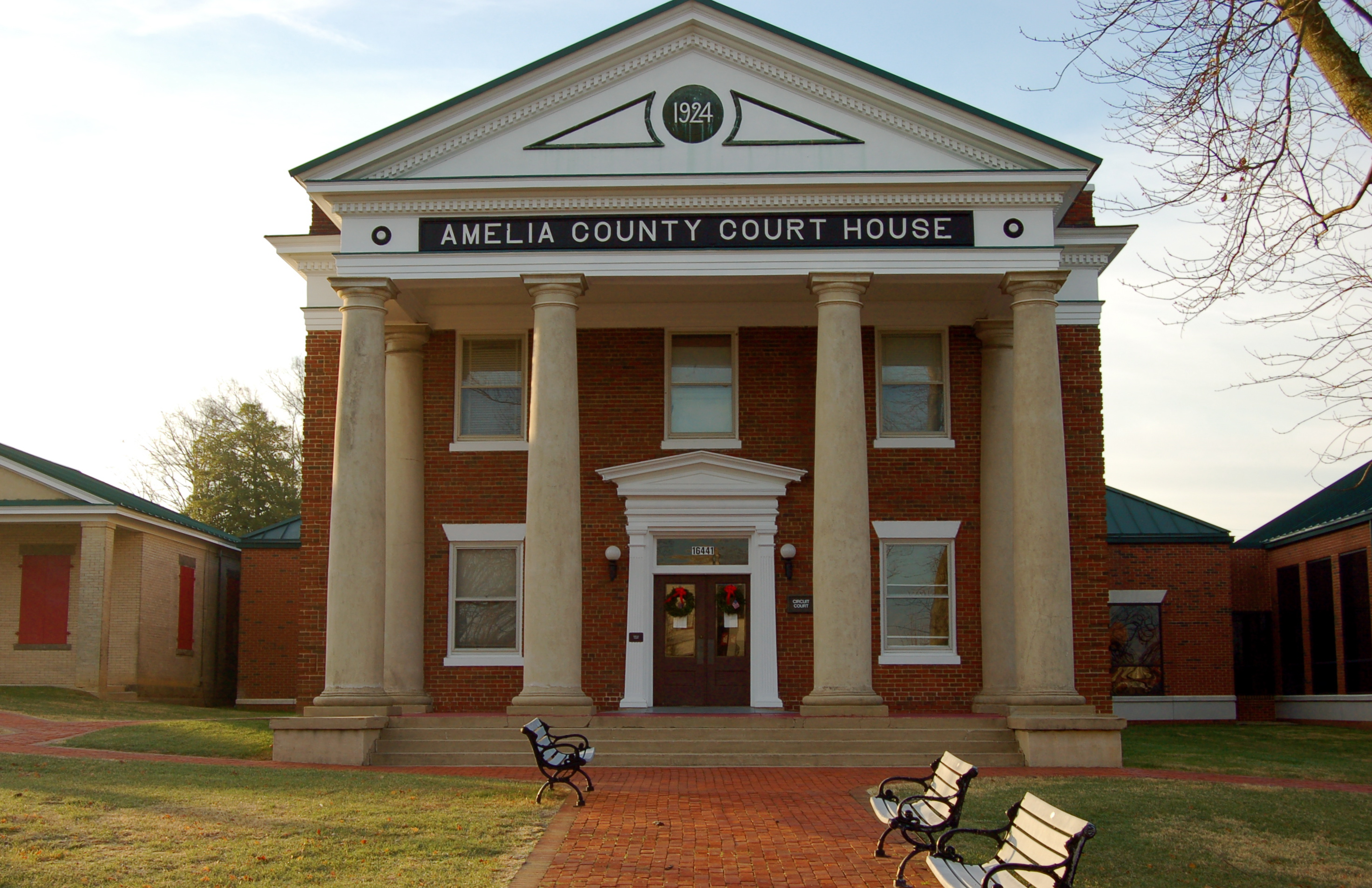
- Amelia County Court House

- Seal

- Location within the U.S. state of Virginia
- Coordinates: 37°20′N 77°59′W
- Country: United States
- State: Virginia
- Founded: 1735
- Named for: Princess Amelia
- Seat: Amelia Court House

Area
  - Total: 359 sq mi (930 km^{2})
  - Land: 355 sq mi (920 km^{2})
  - Water: 3.3 sq mi (8.5 km^{2}) 0.9%

Population (2020)
  - Total: 13,265
  - Estimate (2025): 13,632 ▲
  - Density: 37.4/sq mi (14.4/km^{2})
- Demonym(s): Amelian, Amellianaire
- Time zone: UTC−5 (Eastern)
  - Summer (DST): UTC−4 (EDT)
- ZIP Codes: 23002, 23083, 23105
- Congressional district: 5th
- Website: va-ameliacounty.civicplus.com

Amelia County is a county located just southwest of Richmond in the Commonwealth of Virginia, United States. The county is located in Central Virginia and is included in the Greater Richmond Region. Its county seat is Amelia Court House.

Amelia County was created in 1735 from parts of Prince George and Brunswick counties and was named in honor of Princess Amelia of Great Britain. Parts of the county were later carved out to create Prince Edward and Nottoway counties.

As of the 2020 census, the county population was 13,265.

== History ==
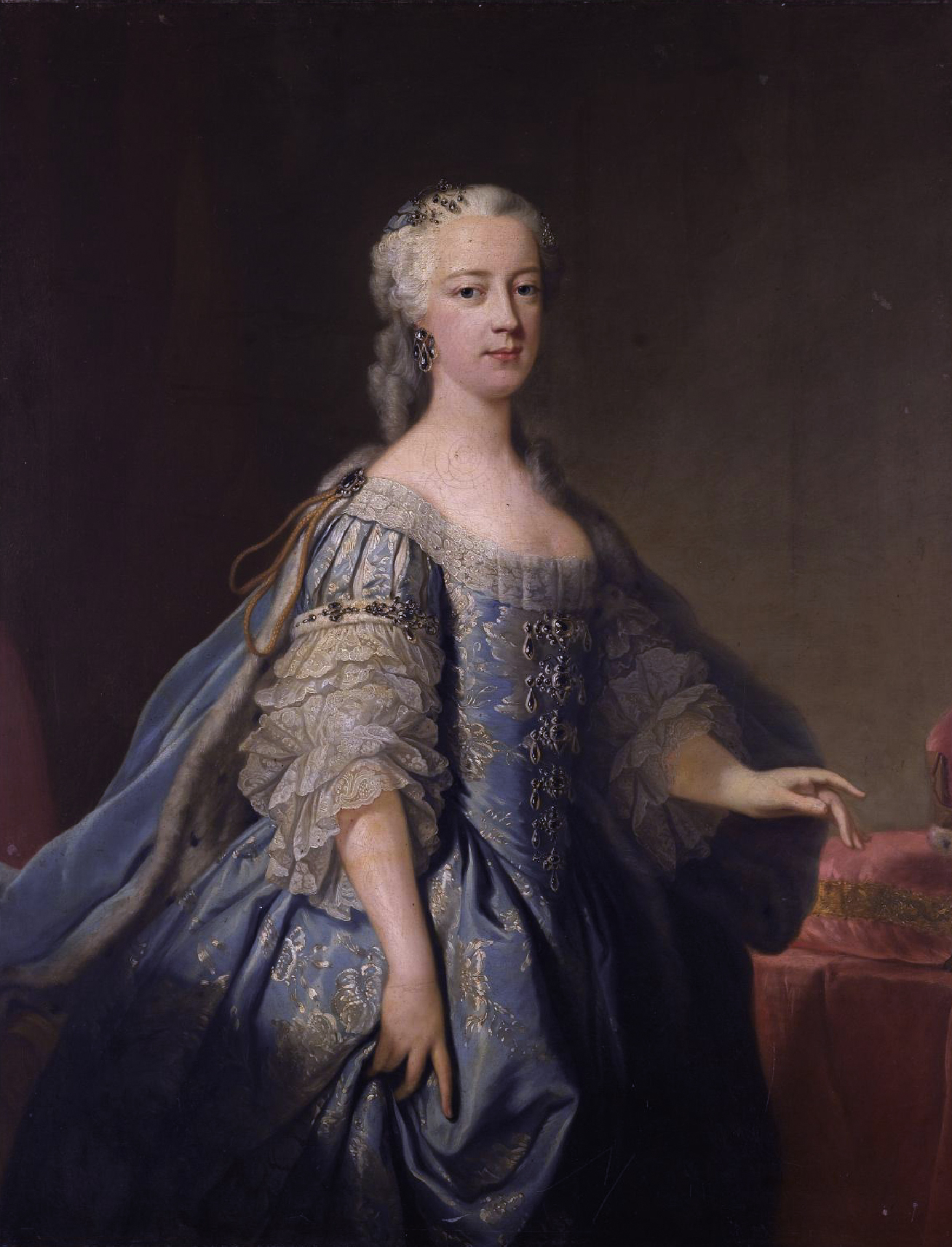
Princess Amelia of Great Britain, for whom the county is named

Amelia County was created by legislative act in 1734 and 1735 from parts of Prince George and Brunswick counties. The county is named for Princess Amelia of Great Britain, daughter of King George II. As was customary, Amelia County was reduced by the division of territory to form newer counties as the population increased in the region; in 1754, Prince Edward County was formed from parts of Amelia County, and in 1789, Nottoway County was formed. The area was developed for plantation agriculture dependent on slave labor.

During the Civil War, Confederate general Robert E. Lee and his army spent April 4 and 5, 1865, at Amelia Court House before his surrender on April 9 to General Ulysses S. Grant at Appomattox. The last major battle of his army was fought at Sayler's Creek, on the border of Amelia and Prince Edward counties, on April 6.

Amelia is known for its minerals, including the nation's best supply of amazonite, a green feldspar found at the Morefield mine. In the 19th century, spas were developed around its mineral springs, which were destinations for travelers.

In 1986 the Amelia County Fair sponsored a competition for the world's largest potato pancake (with apple sauce). It was constructed to raise money that year for the German American National Scholarship Fund. The pancake weighed more than two and one-quarter tons and used four truckloads of potatoes.

== Geography ==
According to the U.S. Census Bureau, the county has a total area of 359 square miles (930 km^{2}), of which 355 square miles (920 km^{2}) is land and 3.3 square miles (8.5 km^{2}) (0.9%) is water.

Amelia County lies in the Piedmont region of Virginia, known for rolling hills and small ridges that lie between the Blue Ridge Mountains and Coastal Plain of Virginia. The county is bordered by the Appomattox River to the north and west, and Namozine Creek to the east.

Amelia County is drained by tributaries of the Appomattox. The lowest elevation in the county is 158 feet (48 m), on Lake Chesdin on the Appomattox at the eastern extremity of the county. The highest elevation is 525 feet (160 m), on SR 616 (S. Genito Road) at the community of Gills in the southwest corner of the county.

=== Adjacent counties ===
- Powhatan County – north
- Chesterfield County – east
- Dinwiddie County – southeast
- Nottoway County – south
- Prince Edward County – southwest
- Cumberland County – west

== Transportation ==
=== Air ===
- Richmond International Airport is located 51 miles (82 km) northeast of Amelia County.

=== US Highways ===
- US 360 (Patrick Henry Highway. Eastbound to Richmond. Westbound to Burkeville and Danville.)

=== State Routes ===
- SR 38 (In Amelia Court House: Virginia Street, Court Street, Washington Street, Church Street, Five Forks Road. In Amelia County: N. Five Forks Road, to SR 153.)
- SR 153 (Military Road. To US 460 and Blackstone.)
- SR 307 (Holly Farms Road. To US 460 and Farmville.)

=== Secondary Routes ===
- SR 604 (Chula Rd and Genito Rd. To Powhatan and Chesterfield Counties.)
- SR 609 (Grub Hill Church Rd and Royalton Rd. To US 60 and Powhatan Court House.)
- SR 614 (Dennisville Rd. To Blackstone.)
- SR 616 (Genito Rd. Serves the northwest and southwest area of Amelia County. To SR 307 near Rice.)

=== Rail ===
- Norfolk Southern – freight rail service

== Demographics ==
Historical population
Census	Pop.	Note	%±
1790	18,097		—
1800	9,432		−47.9%
1810	10,594		12.3%
1820	11,104		4.8%
1830	11,036		−0.6%
1840	10,320		−6.5%
1850	9,770		−5.3%
1860	10,741		9.9%
1870	9,878		−8.0%
1880	10,377		5.1%
1890	9,068		−12.6%
1900	9,037		−0.3%
1910	8,720		−3.5%
1920	9,800		12.4%
1930	8,799		−10.2%
1940	8,495		−3.5%
1950	7,908		−6.9%
1960	7,815		−1.2%
1970	7,592		−2.9%
1980	8,405		10.7%
1990	8,787		4.5%
2000	11,400		29.7%
2010	12,690		11.3%
2020	13,265		4.5%
2025 (est.)	13,632	▲	2.8%
U.S. Decennial Census; 1790-1960 1900-1990; 1990-2000 2010 2020

=== Racial and ethnic composition ===
Amelia County, Virginia – Racial and ethnic composition Note: the US Census treats Hispanic/Latino as an ethnic category. This table excludes Latinos from the racial categories and assigns them to a separate category. Hispanics/Latinos may be of any race.
Race / Ethnicity (NH = Non-Hispanic)	Pop 1980	Pop 1990	Pop 2000	Pop 2010	Pop 2020	% 1980	% 1990	% 2000	% 2010	% 2020
White alone (NH)	5,108	5,905	8,007	9,233	9,687	60.77%	67.20%	70.24%	72.76%	73.03%
Black or African American alone (NH)	3,164	2,809	3,183	2,925	2,546	37.64%	31.97%	27.92%	23.05%	19.19%
Native American or Alaska Native alone (NH)	4	14	32	39	18	0.05%	0.16%	0.28%	0.31%	0.14%
Asian alone (NH)	22	13	19	27	63	0.26%	0.15%	0.17%	0.21%	0.47%
Native Hawaiian or Pacific Islander alone (NH)	x	x	2	0	0	x	x	0.02%	0.00%	0.00%
Other race alone (NH)	17	1	5	10	50	0.20%	0.01%	0.04%	0.08%	0.38%
Mixed race or Multiracial (NH)	x	x	61	166	476	x	x	0.54%	1.31%	3.59%
Hispanic or Latino (any race)	90	45	91	290	425	1.07%	0.51%	0.80%	2.29%	3.20%
Total	8,405	8,787	11,400	12,690	13,265	100.00%	100.00%	100.00%	100.00%	100.00%

=== 2020 census ===
As of the 2020 census, the county had a population of 13,265. The median age was 46.1 years. 20.2% of residents were under the age of 18 and 21.0% of residents were 65 years of age or older. For every 100 females there were 98.0 males, and for every 100 females age 18 and over there were 94.8 males age 18 and over.

The racial makeup of the county was 73.7% White, 19.3% Black or African American, 0.3% American Indian and Alaska Native, 0.5% Asian, 0.0% Native Hawaiian and Pacific Islander, 1.5% from some other race, and 4.8% from two or more races. Hispanic or Latino residents of any race comprised 3.2% of the population.

0.0% of residents lived in urban areas, while 100.0% lived in rural areas.

There were 5,206 households in the county, of which 28.7% had children under the age of 18 living with them and 22.4% had a female householder with no spouse or partner present. About 23.6% of all households were made up of individuals and 11.1% had someone living alone who was 65 years of age or older.

There were 5,704 housing units, of which 8.7% were vacant. Among occupied housing units, 81.8% were owner-occupied and 18.2% were renter-occupied. The homeowner vacancy rate was 0.8% and the rental vacancy rate was 5.8%.

=== 2000 Census ===
As of the census of 2000, there were 11,400 people, 4,240 households, and 3,175 families residing in the county. The population density was 32 people per square mile (12 people/km^{2}). There were 4,609 housing units, at an average density of 13 units per square mile (5.0 units/km^{2}). The racial makeup of the county was 70.57% White, 28.05% Black or African American, 0.28% Native American, 0.17% Asian, 0.02% Pacific Islander, 0.25% from other races, and 0.67% from two or more races. 0.80% of the population were Hispanic or Latino of any race.

There were 4,240 households, of which 32.80% had children under the age of 18 living with them, 59.10% were married couples living together, 11.40% had a female householder with no husband present, and 25.10% were non-families. 20.70% of all households were made up of individuals, and 8.10% had someone living alone who was 65 years of age or older. The average household size was 2.66 and the average family size was 3.07.

The median age was 38 years, with 25.30% under 18, 6.70% from 18 to 24, 29.20% from 25 to 44, 25.40% from 45 to 64, and 13.30% who were 65 years of age or older. For every 100 females, there were 97.30 males. For every 100 females age 18 and over, there were 94.20 males.

The median household income was $40,252, and the median family income was $47,157. Males had a median income of $32,315, versus $23,102 for females. The per capita income for the county was $18,858. 8.40% of the population and 6.70% of families were below the poverty line. Out of the total people living in poverty, 7.10% were under the age of 18 and 11.70% were 65 or older.

== Culture ==
=== Seasonal Events ===
- A countywide festival called Amelia Day is held each May on the Saturday before Mother's Day in Amelia Court House. The festival started in the 1980s to celebrate the town's founding. Vendors, local clubs, and citizens organize to enjoy music, dancing, and socializing. At the first Amelia Day in 1985, residents signed a long roll that, along with other items, was put in a time capsule and buried in the courthouse green near the Confederate War Memorial. The capsule is scheduled to be opened in 2035.
- The Amelia County Fair is held in late summer or early fall each year at the Joe Paulette Memorial Park in Amelia Court House.
- Each October, the Amelia Frightfest, a trail haunt, opens at Tom Scott Park in Amelia Court House.
- Every year from April to October, on the second Saturday of every month, The Time Bandits car club hosts a car show at the Truist Bank parking lot on Patrick Henry Highway.

=== Attractions ===
- Sayler's Creek Battlefield State Park
- Lake Chesdin
- Amelia Wildlife Management Area
- Amelia Country Club

== Government ==
=== Board of Supervisors ===
- District 1: David M. Felts Jr. (Chairman)
- District 2: Dexter Jones
- District 3: Benjamin "Benji" Morris
- District 4: H. Joseph Easter IV
- District 5: Todd Robinson (Vice Chairman)

=== Constitutional officers ===
- Clerk of the Circuit Court: Marilyn L. Wilson (D)
- Commissioner of the Revenue: Laura Walsh (I)
- Commonwealth's Attorney: Lee R. Harrison (I)
- Sheriff: Rick Walker (I)
- Treasurer: Stephanie Coleman (I)

Amelia County is represented by Republican John McGuire in the Virginia Senate, Republican Lee Ware in the Virginia House of Delegates, and Republican Bob Good in the U.S. House of Representatives.

United States presidential election results for Amelia County, Virginia
Year	Republican		Democratic		Third party(ies)	
Year	No.	%	No.	%	No.	%
1912	32	7.82%	325	79.46%	52	12.71%
1916	80	16.39%	403	82.58%	5	1.02%
1920	179	31.18%	389	67.77%	6	1.05%
1924	153	28.33%	372	68.89%	15	2.78%
1928	277	35.74%	498	64.26%	0	0.00%
1932	142	16.63%	701	82.08%	11	1.29%
1936	239	23.97%	753	75.53%	5	0.50%
1940	267	32.13%	562	67.63%	2	0.24%
1944	295	34.67%	553	64.98%	3	0.35%
1948	372	35.16%	443	41.87%	243	22.97%
1952	832	53.64%	703	45.33%	16	1.03%
1956	745	43.11%	403	23.32%	580	33.56%
1960	784	51.44%	708	46.46%	32	2.10%
1964	1,348	60.21%	884	39.48%	7	0.31%
1968	857	33.90%	830	32.83%	841	33.27%
1972	1,606	64.99%	778	31.49%	87	3.52%
1976	1,634	47.25%	1,715	49.60%	109	3.15%
1980	1,969	53.20%	1,643	44.39%	89	2.40%
1984	2,336	61.41%	1,432	37.64%	36	0.95%
1988	2,187	60.85%	1,359	37.81%	48	1.34%
1992	2,062	48.82%	1,534	36.32%	628	14.87%
1996	2,119	51.13%	1,625	39.21%	400	9.65%
2000	2,947	61.55%	1,754	36.63%	87	1.82%
2004	3,499	64.83%	1,862	34.50%	36	0.67%
2008	3,970	60.81%	2,488	38.11%	71	1.09%
2012	4,331	62.63%	2,490	36.01%	94	1.36%
2016	4,708	66.88%	2,128	30.23%	204	2.90%
2020	5,390	68.29%	2,411	30.55%	92	1.17%
2024	5,776	71.76%	2,214	27.51%	59	0.73%

== Media ==
The Amelia Bulletin Monitor, a weekly newspaper, has covered the county since 1973.

== Education ==
=== Public Primary and secondary schools ===
Amelia County is served by the Amelia County Public Schools.

- Amelia County High School
- Amelia County Middle School
- Amelia County Elementary School

=== Private Primary and secondary Schools ===
- Amelia Academy

== Communities ==
There are no incorporated communities in Amelia County.

=== Census-designated places ===
- Amelia Court House

=== Unincorporated communities ===
- Ammon
- Chula
- Clementown Mills
- Coverly
- Deatonville
- Denaro
- Earls
- Fieldstown
- Giles Mill
- Gills
- Haw Branch
- Jetersville
- Little Patrick
- Lodore
- Mannboro
- Maplewood
- Masons Corner
- Mattoax
- Morven
- Namozine
- Otterburn
- Paineville
- Pontons/Ponton's/Pointons Store
- Rodophil
- Scotts Fork
- Truxillo
- Winterham

== Historic sites ==
The following sites in Amelia County are listed on the National Register of Historic Places:

- Barrett–Chumney House
- Dykeland
- Egglestetton
- Farmer House
- Haw Branch
- Ingleside
- St. John's Church (Grub Hill Church)
- Sayler's Creek Battlefield
- Wigwam
- Winterham Plantation

== Notable people ==
- William S. Archer, born in Amelia County, United States Senator from Virginia
- Van T. Barfoot (1919–2012), U.S. Army Colonel and a U.S. Congressional Medal of Honor Recipient
- William Wyatt Bibb, born in Amelia County, United States Senator from Georgia and first Governor of Alabama
- Jesse Bragg, Negro-league baseball player
- William Cocke (1747–1828), born in Amelia County, first United States Senator from Tennessee
- Henry William Connor (1793–1866), born near Amelia Court House, elected United States Congressman from North Carolina
- Rosa Dixon Bowser (1855-1931), born in Amelia County, first African American Teacher hired in Richmond, Virginia. Established the Virginia Teacher's Reading Circle, which became the Virginia State Teachers Association,
- David Fanning, (1755–1825), born in Amelia County. A Loyalist officer during the American Revolutionary War, he captured Thomas Burke, a court-martial judge and Governor of North Carolina. One of only three individuals excluded from the amnesty after the Revolutionary War, Fanning moved to New Brunswick in present-day Canada for resettlement.
- William Branch Giles, (1762–1830), born in Amelia County. Planter, United States Congressman, United States Senator, and Governor of Virginia
- David Greenhill Member of the Colonial House of Burgesses
- Edmund Harrison (1764–1826), Speaker of the Virginia House of Delegates (1802–1803)
- John Winston Jones, (1791–1848), born in Amelia County. Speaker of the United States House of Representatives
- Nellie A. Ramsey Leslie (c.1840s–c.1920s), born into slavery in Amelia County. She became a noted musician, teacher and composer, founding a musical conservatory in Corpus Christi, Texas.
- Robert Russa Moton (1867–1940), noted African American educator. He was born in Amelia County but was raised in Rice in nearby Prince Edward County, Virginia.
- Mary Virginia Terhune (1830–1922), born in Amelia County. A prolific and bestselling author in both fiction and non-fiction, the first woman elected to the Virginia Historical Society
