= Jetersville, Virginia =

Unincorporated community in Virginia, United States

- Unincorporated community
- Location within the Commonwealth of Virginia Jetersville, Virginia (the United States)
- Coordinates: 37.2935°N 78.0955°W
- Country: United States
- State: Virginia
- County: Amelia
- Elevation: 457 ft (139 m)
- Time zone: UTC−5 (Eastern (EST))
  - Summer (DST): UTC−4 (EDT)
- ZIP code: 23083
- Area code: 804
- GNIS feature ID: 1495758

Jetersville is a mostly rural unincorporated community in southwestern Amelia County in the U.S. state of Virginia, just off U.S. Route 360 (Patrick Henry Highway). The town is centered around the intersection of SR 671 (Jetersville Road, a short loop segment of old US 360) and SR 640 (Perkinson Road). The Norfolk Southern Railway runs along the main roads.

== History ==
=== Origins ===
Jetersville, at first called Perkinsonville, was named for John "Black Jack" Jeter, according to local lore. Other sources hold that it was named for John's father, Rodophil Jeter (for whom the community of Rodophil was also named). Apparently the Jeters originally were French Huguenots who fled persecution, eventually coming to America around the beginning of the 1700s. Rodophil Jeter was a delegate to the state legislature and a prominent figure in Amelia County government in the early 1800s, and several members of his family established businesses in the area. The town's post office, one of the earliest in Amelia County, was called "Jetersville" (or, later, "Jetersville Station") beginning about 1826 or 1827.

=== Civil War ===
Jetersville lies close to the route followed by Confederate general Robert E. Lee and his army in their retreat during the final days of the Civil War, before the surrender to Ulysses S. Grant at Appomattox on April 9, 1865. The last major battle fought by Lee's army occurred just a few miles west at Sayler's Creek, on the border of Amelia and Prince Edward counties, on April 6. Numerous roadside historical marker signs line the route, including one on old US 360 that reads as follows:

Jetersville: April 5, 1865: Lee found Union cavalry and infantry across his line of retreat at this station on the Richmond and Danville Railroad. Rather than attacking the entrenched Federals, he chose to change direction and begin a night march toward Farmville where rations awaited the army.

=== Mining ===
In the late 1800s and early 1900s, the Schlegel (or Schlegal) and Keystone mica mines near Jetersville were among several lodes developed into profitable operations in Amelia County, although they were quickly depleted. The area around Jetersville and Amelia contains some of the most extensive mica and feldspar deposits in Virginia.

=== Tornadoes ===
Amelia County is located in a small Central Virginia tornado alley and has had numerous tornado touchdowns. Tornadoes of note include the April 30, 1924, twister that passed east of the courthouse area, traveling from the Jetersville vicinity to Chula, killing one person and injuring seven others.

=== Rosenwald School ===
Jetersville School, built circa 1923 or 1924, was among several Rosenwald Schools in Amelia County constructed between 1917 and 1928. The design for Jetersville called for a 4-acre campus with a building to accommodate two teachers. During the early 20th century, the Rosenwald School project was a collaborative effort that erected thousands of facilities across the South primarily for the education of African American children. A property on US 360 named Jetersville School was advertised for sale in the 1960s, after desegregation.

=== Present-day Jetersville ===
Jetersville remained a small but prosperous railway stop well into the 20th century. The railroad now carries only freight trains, however, and the older section of town, centered around the former rail station, has fallen into decline, as the depot has closed and development has shifted northwest toward the four-lane US 360 bypass. The town still has its own fire station (Amelia County Volunteer Fire Department Co. 3), as well as its own post office (ZIP code 23083), which serves most of western Amelia County.
