= Sutherland, Virginia =

Unincorporated community in Virginia, United States

- Unincorporated community
- Location within Virginia Location within the United States
- Coordinates: 37°11′46″N 77°33′35″W
- Country: United States
- State: Virginia
- County: Dinwiddie
- Elevation: 289 ft (88 m)
- Time zone: UTC−5 (Eastern (EST))
  - Summer (DST): UTC−4 (EDT)
- ZIP code: 23885
- Area code: 804
- GNIS feature ID: 1500198

Sutherland is an unincorporated community in Dinwiddie County, Virginia, United States. Sutherland is located on U.S. Route 460, 9 miles (14 km) west-southwest of Petersburg.

This town was a stop on the Southside Railroad in the mid-nineteenth century. This became the Atlantic, Mississippi and Ohio Railroad in 1870 and then a line in the Norfolk and Western Railway and now the Norfolk Southern Railway. Sutherland was the location of the Civil War Battle of Sutherland's Station on April 2, 1865 during the Appomattox Campaign.

== Notable person ==
Mathematician Gladys West was born in Sutherland.
