= Postal village =

Type of settlement

A postal village or post village (p.v., P.V., PV or p-v) is generally a settlement that has a post office.

== Definition and abbreviation ==
In North American usage, the term "post village" refers to a small community (a village) which has a post office. The definition is similar to that of "postal town": "a town having a main post office branch".

Other sources have slightly different definitions for post villages. Colina Stanton of the Chapman Center for Rural Studies at Kansas State University states, "early atlases often use the term “post village” to refer to towns founded with little more than a post office and a store."

In India, a postal village is distinct from other types of villages (such as revenue or census villages), being designated for mail delivery.

When referring to postal villages, the abbreviation PV or p.v. has sometimes been used. Webster's 1896 Collegiate Dictionary explained this as standing for "post village".

== See also ==
- Crossroads village
- Police village
