= Amelia Court House, Virginia =

Amelia Court House
- Census-designated place
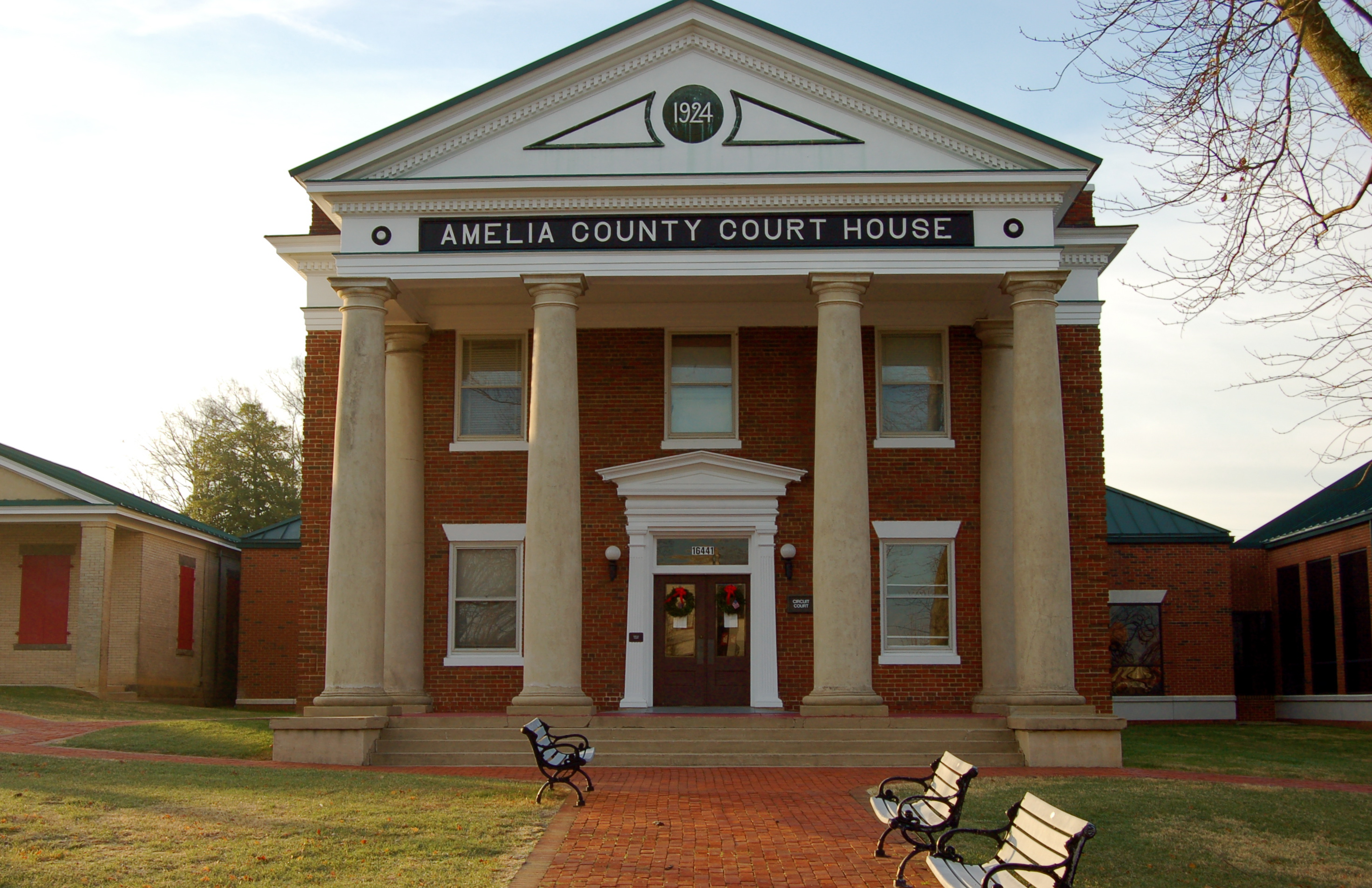
- County courthouse in Amelia

- Location within the Commonwealth of Virginia Amelia Court House (the United States)
- Coordinates: 37°20′32″N 77°58′52″W
- Country: United States
- State: Virginia
- County: Amelia

Area (as defined by U.S. Census Bureau)
  - Total: 3.78 sq mi (9.8 km^{2})
  - Land: 3.77 sq mi (9.8 km^{2})
  - Water: 0.01 sq mi (0.026 km^{2})
- Elevation: 380 ft (120 m)

Population (2010)
  - Total: 1,099
  - Density: 292/sq mi (113/km^{2})
- Time zone: UTC−5 (Eastern (EST))
  - Summer (DST): UTC−4 (EDT)
- ZIP code: 23002
- Area code: 804
- GNIS feature ID: 1498446

Amelia Court House (also known as Amelia Courthouse and Amelia) is the county seat of Amelia County in the U.S. state of Virginia and a census-designated place. As of the 2020 census, Amelia Court House had a population of 965. The town was named for Princess Amelia of Great Britain, the second daughter of Great Britain's King George II, in 1735.

== History ==
Amelia Court House was founded in a rural area of the Virginia Piedmont developed for plantations of mixed crops. In the 19th century, spas were developed around nearby mineral springs, which served as vacation destinations for travelers. Visitors arrived by railroad after one was built to serve the area. Among the planters who came to the spas with their families was Robert E. Lee, the future Confederate general.

By the 1850s, the new Richmond and Danville Railroad (later the Southern Railway) had been extended to the village. The R&D was a crucial supply line for the Confederacy during the Civil War. After General Robert E. Lee retreated from Petersburg in 1865, he spent April 4 and 5 in Amelia Court House waiting for desperately needed supplies from Richmond. Those supplies never arrived. Instead, a train came through carrying government documents. The last major engagement of Lee's army with Union forces occurred April 6, 1865, on the border of Amelia County at the Battle of Sayler's Creek. Lee surrendered at Appomattox Court House on April 9, 1865.

The offices of Amelia's court clerks contain records dating before the Civil War, unlike many other Virginia courthouses, which lost such records in wartime destruction. The Union forces were rushing to catch up to Lee's Army of Northern Virginia and did not ensure that the courthouse records were burned. The iron shutters and brick construction of the courthouse protected its contents.

In the 20th century, the area was still known for the amazonite produced at the Morefield Mine. Amazonite is a crystallized stone, a green variety of microcline feldspar.

A countywide festival called Amelia Day is held each May on the Saturday before Mother's Day. The festival started in the 1980s to celebrate the town's founding. Vendors, local clubs, and citizens organize to enjoy music, dancing, and socializing. At the first Amelia Day, residents signed a long roll that, along with other items, was put in a time capsule and buried in the courthouse green near the Confederate War Memorial.

=== Tornadoes ===
In 2003, Amelia Day was cancelled after the courthouse green was struck by an F1 tornado on Friday, May 8, the day before the festival. The tornado destroyed most of the trees on the green.

A small Virginia tornado alley exists in Central Virginia, and Amelia County has had numerous tornado touchdowns. Tornadoes of note include the April 30, 1924, twister that passed east of the courthouse area, traveling from Jetersville to Chula, killing one person and injuring seven others. A tornado hit Amelia County on October 13, 1983, one of a family of tornadoes that affected much of Central and Northern Virginia. Other strong tornadoes have affected the county, especially to the east.

== Transportation ==
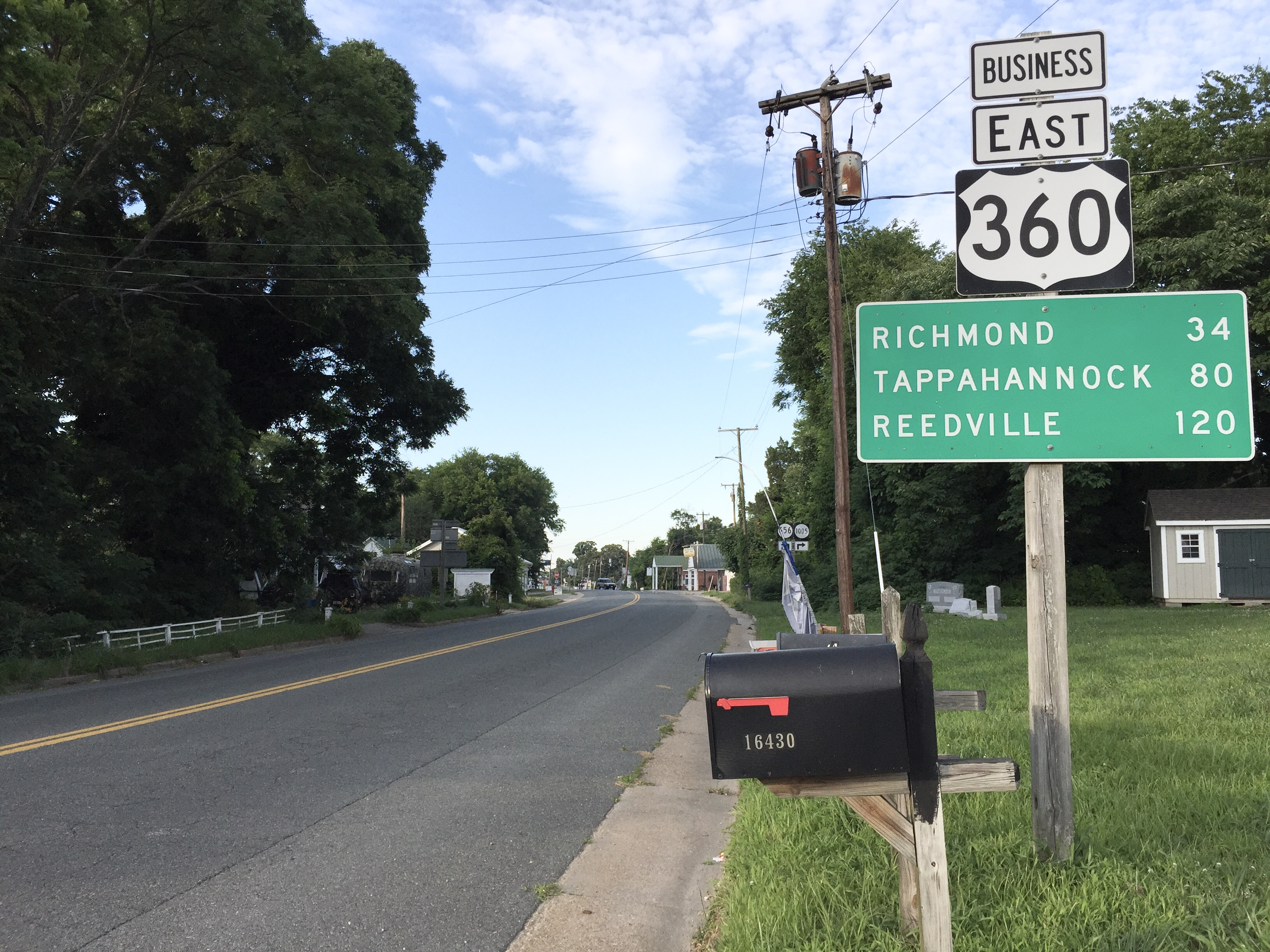
View east along U.S. 360 Business at Virginia St (Route 1009)

=== Business Routes ===
US 360 Bus. (Goode's Bridge Rd.)

=== State Routes ===
SR 38 (Five Forks Rd., N. Five Forks Rd., and Virginia, Court, Washington, & Church Streets)

== Climate ==
Like much of the South, the area is characterized by long, hot, humid summers and generally mild to cool winters. According to the Köppen Climate Classification system, Amelia Court House has a humid subtropical climate, abbreviated "Cfa" on climate maps.

Climate data for Amelia Court House, Virginia (1991–2020 normals, extremes 1970–present)
Month	Jan	Feb	Mar	Apr	May	Jun	Jul	Aug	Sep	Oct	Nov	Dec	Year
Record high °F (°C)	82 (28)	82 (28)	90 (32)	96 (36)	96 (36)	104 (40)	106 (41)	102 (39)	99 (37)	99 (37)	87 (31)	82 (28)	106 (41)
Mean maximum °F (°C)	67.8 (19.9)	72.4 (22.4)	80.4 (26.9)	86.6 (30.3)	90.9 (32.7)	95.0 (35.0)	98.0 (36.7)	98.2 (36.8)	92.6 (33.7)	86.1 (30.1)	76.5 (24.7)	71.3 (21.8)	98.5 (36.9)
Mean daily maximum °F (°C)	48.6 (9.2)	52.3 (11.3)	59.9 (15.5)	71.1 (21.7)	77.4 (25.2)	85.2 (29.6)	89.2 (31.8)	87.2 (30.7)	81.3 (27.4)	71.0 (21.7)	60.9 (16.1)	52.1 (11.2)	69.7 (20.9)
Daily mean °F (°C)	38.1 (3.4)	40.6 (4.8)	47.8 (8.8)	58.1 (14.5)	66.1 (18.9)	74.4 (23.6)	78.5 (25.8)	76.7 (24.8)	70.4 (21.3)	59.2 (15.1)	49.2 (9.6)	41.4 (5.2)	58.4 (14.7)
Mean daily minimum °F (°C)	27.7 (−2.4)	28.9 (−1.7)	35.7 (2.1)	45.1 (7.3)	54.8 (12.7)	63.7 (17.6)	67.9 (19.9)	66.2 (19.0)	59.4 (15.2)	47.5 (8.6)	37.4 (3.0)	30.6 (−0.8)	47.1 (8.4)
Mean minimum °F (°C)	8.0 (−13.3)	13.2 (−10.4)	18.4 (−7.6)	28.7 (−1.8)	39.6 (4.2)	49.4 (9.7)	57.9 (14.4)	56.0 (13.3)	45.8 (7.7)	32.1 (0.1)	21.1 (−6.1)	16.3 (−8.7)	6.1 (−14.4)
Record low °F (°C)	−11 (−24)	−12 (−24)	10 (−12)	17 (−8)	30 (−1)	38 (3)	45 (7)	41 (5)	32 (0)	23 (−5)	10 (−12)	−1 (−18)	−12 (−24)
Average precipitation inches (mm)	3.66 (93)	2.89 (73)	4.44 (113)	3.41 (87)	4.33 (110)	3.60 (91)	3.90 (99)	4.03 (102)	4.08 (104)	3.79 (96)	3.38 (86)	3.91 (99)	45.42 (1,154)
Average snowfall inches (cm)	3.3 (8.4)	2.3 (5.8)	1.1 (2.8)	0.0 (0.0)	0.0 (0.0)	0.0 (0.0)	0.0 (0.0)	0.0 (0.0)	0.0 (0.0)	0.0 (0.0)	0.0 (0.0)	1.6 (4.1)	8.3 (21)
Average precipitation days (≥ 0.01 in)	11.2	9.7	11.2	10.7	11.8	10.2	10.1	8.9	9.4	9.0	8.2	10.8	121.2
Average snowy days (≥ 0.1 in)	1.6	1.4	0.5	0.0	0.0	0.0	0.0	0.0	0.0	0.0	0.0	0.7	4.2
Source: NOAA

== Demographics ==
Historical population
Census	Pop.	Note	%±
2020	965		—
U.S. Decennial Census; 2010 2020

Amelia Court House was first listed as a census designated place in the 2010 U.S. census.

== Points of interest ==
- Amelia Golf & Country Club
- Joe Paulette Memorial Park
- Tom Scott Park
- Rennie Memorial Presbyterian Church, a historic congregation south of town

== Notable people ==
- Worth McMillion, racing driver
- Landon Pembelton, racing driver
- Toby Wing, early 20th century actress, was born in Amelia Court House.
