= National Register of Historic Places listings in Amelia County, Virginia =

Location of Amelia County in Virginia

This is a list of the National Register of Historic Places listings in Amelia County, Virginia.

This is intended to be a complete list of the properties and districts on the National Register of Historic Places in Amelia County, Virginia, United States. The locations of National Register properties and districts for which the latitude and longitude coordinates are included below, may be seen in a Google map.

There are 10 properties and districts listed on the National Register in the county, including 1 National Historic Landmark.

This National Park Service list is complete through NPS recent listings posted May 1, 2026.

== Current listings ==
	Name on the Register	Image	Date listed	Location	City or town	Description
1	Barrett-Chumney House	Barrett-Chumney House	November 18, 2011 (#11000832)	2400 Richmond Rd. 37°13′43″N 77°50′42″W	Amelia Courthouse	
2	Dykeland	Dykeland	May 8, 1987 (#87000721)	Dykeland Rd. 37°24′22″N 77°54′31″W	Chula	
3	Egglestetton	Egglestetton	March 28, 1980 (#80004167)	Northwest of Chula; 37°23′56″N 77°59′05″W	Chula	
4	Farmer House	Farmer House	November 17, 1978 (#78003004)	3 miles (4.8 km) southeast of Deatonville on Jennings Ordinary Rd. 37°17′10″N 78°09′22″W	Deatonville	
5	Haw Branch	Haw Branch	April 2, 1973 (#73001992)	North of Amelia off Haw Branch Ln. 37°24′38″N 78°01′13″W	Amelia Courthouse	
6	Ingleside	Ingleside	September 12, 1997 (#97001071)	10920 Rodophil Rd. 37°22′12″N 78°09′34″W	Amelia Courthouse	
7	St. John's Church	St. John's Church	November 16, 1978 (#78003003)	3.8 miles (6.1 km) west on Grub Hill Church Rd. 37°23′59″N 77°58′12″W	Chula	
8	Sayler's Creek Battlefield	Sayler's Creek Battlefield	February 4, 1985 (#85002436)	Sayler's Creek, James Towne, and Bunker Hill Rds. 37°18′28″N 78°13′40″W	Farmville	
9	Wigwam	Wigwam	November 25, 1969 (#69000220)	8 miles (13 km) northwest of Chula; 37°28′18″N 77°59′53″W	Chula	
10	Winterham	Winterham	October 15, 2002 (#02001183)	11440 Grub Hill Church Rd. 37°22′46″N 77°58′39″W	Winterham	

== See also ==
- List of National Historic Landmarks in Virginia
- National Register of Historic Places listings in Virginia
