= Lodore, Virginia =

Unincorporated community in Virginia, United States

- Unincorporated community
- Location within the Commonwealth of Virginia Lodore, Virginia (the United States)
- Coordinates: 37°26′22″N 78°01′21″W
- Country: United States
- State: Virginia
- County: Amelia
- Elevation: 364 ft (111 m)
- Time zone: UTC−5 (Eastern (EST))
  - Summer (DST): UTC−4 (EDT)
- ZIP code: 23002
- Area code: 804
- FIPS code: 51/46520
- GNIS feature ID: 1477496

Lodore is a rural unincorporated community in northern Amelia County just south of the Appomattox River in the U.S. state of Virginia. It is located along SR 616 (S. Genito Road) at its intersection with the northern terminus of SR 636 (N. Lodore Road).

== History ==
=== Post office ===
The community was listed as a post village called Houston before the name was changed to Lodore about 1845. On Civil War–era maps, however, "Lodore" was used only as a reference to the home of one of the landowners along Genito Road; an intersection just under a mile away was noted as Giles Crossroads or Giles Chapel, after William Branch Giles, U.S. senator and governor of Virginia, whose former home is a short distance northeast. The Lodore post office remained in operation until at least the turn of the 20th century, but was among the thousands of small "fourth class" facilities that were closed in the early 1900s after the advent of rural free delivery. The Lodore area is now served by the post office several miles south at the county seat, Amelia Court House, ZIP code 23002.

=== Civil War ===
The immediate vicinity of Lodore appears to have been spared significant action during most of the Civil War, although several skirmishes and bloody engagements were fought only a few miles to the south and west during the final days of the war in early April 1865, as General Robert E. Lee and his army continued their westward retreat and Federal troops pursued. A Confederate wagon train carrying desperately needed supplies from Richmond, forced to bypass the Lodore area because wet weather had rendered the Genito bridge over the Appomattox River uncrossable, was destroyed by Union troops near Paineville, southwest of Lodore, on April 5.

=== Tornadoes ===
Amelia County is located in a small Central Virginia tornado alley and has had numerous tornado touchdowns. No tornado fatalities have been reported at Lodore, but an EF1 destroyed a carport and damaged an outbuilding northeast of the community on January 12, 2018.

== Historic structures ==
Several structures near Lodore are listed on the National Register of Historic Places, including:

- The Wigwam, historic residence of William Branch Giles, 24th governor of Virginia, approximately 4 miles northeast.
- Haw Branch plantation house, approximately 2 miles south by straight-line distance.
- Grub Hill Church, approximately 4 miles southeast.
- Egglestetton plantation house, approximately 4 miles southeast.

Other historic churches at Lodore include Flower Hill Baptist, an African American congregation whose building stands on S. Genito Road just east of N. Lodore Road.

== Notable residents ==
- William S. Archer (1789 – 1855), United States senator from Virginia, born and buried at "The Lodge" (or "Red Lodge") off present-day SR 609 (Royalton Road) northeast of Lodore
- William Branch Giles (1762 – 1830), U.S. senator and governor of Virginia

== Businesses ==
Oakmulgee Dairy Farm, 4 miles northeast of Lodore atop a hill on SR 637 (Giles Road) above the remnants of the former community of Giles Mill, is the oldest of several working dairy farms in Amelia County, having been in operation since 1898.
