= Coverly, Virginia =

Unincorporated community in Virginia, United States

- Unincorporated community
- Location within the Commonwealth of Virginia Coverly, Virginia (the United States)
- Coordinates: 37°24′25″N 77°53′00″W
- Country: United States
- State: Virginia
- County: Amelia
- Elevation: 282 ft (86 m)
- Time zone: UTC−5 (Eastern (EST))
  - Summer (DST): UTC−4 (EDT)
- ZIP code: 23002
- Area code: 804
- GNIS feature ID: 1492812

Coverly is a rural unincorporated community in northeastern Amelia County in the U.S. state of Virginia. The town is located on SR 631 (Coverly Road) off SR 604 (Chula Road) at Coverly, a farm and historic home built in the 1830s, atop a hill with the Appomattox River to the east, Flat Creek to the south, and the Norfolk Southern Railway to the northwest. Route 631 provides the only access to and from the community, and crosses the railroad, originally the Richmond and Danville, between Coverly and Route 604. The community of Chula lies 2 miles southwest, and Mattoax and Masons Corner approximately 2 miles north. The area is served by the post office at Amelia Court House, the county seat, 8 miles southwest of Coverly, and by Amelia County Volunteer Fire Department Station 4, near Mattoax.

During the Civil War, railroads formed a critical supply network for the Confederacy, and their destruction was therefore a key component of Union strategy. Among the raids targeting the Richmond and Danville Railroad were those conducted in 1864 by cavalry under Union general August Kautz. Confederate defenders clashed with Kautz's forces at Flat Creek Bridge, less than a mile west of the area later called Coverly, on May 14.

Coverly Farm, established circa 1835, continues to operate, offering a seasonal pumpkin patch to the public.
