= Thomas Tabb =

American merchant and politician (d.1769)

Member of the Virginia House of Burgesses from Amelia County
- In office 1761–1769 Serving with David Greenhill, Robert Munford
- Preceded by: Edmund Booker
- In office 1748–1758 Serving with Samuel Cobb, Wood Jones, Richard Booker
- Preceded by: Edward Booker
- Succeeded by: Edmund Booker

Personal details
- Born: Elizabeth City County, Colony of Virginia
- Died: November 23, 1769 'Clay Hill plantation, Amelia County, Colony of Virginia
- Children: John Tabb
- Parent(s): John Tabb Sr., Martha Hand
- Occupation: merchant, planter, politician

Thomas Tabb (died November 23, 1769) was a leading Virginia merchant and politician who founded "Clay Hill" plantation in Amelia County, which he represented in the House of Burgesses for multiple terms. Complicating matters, every generation of this man's family included a man or boy named Thomas Tabb and another named John Tabb. Though the first family member to serve in Virginia's General Assembly was Edward Tabb who represented York County in 1723, this man would be the first Thomas Tabb to serve as a legislator, and two more men of the same name served later: another Thomas Tabb was a delegate representing Lunenburg County in 1778 (and a related Edward Lowry Tabb represented nearby Mecklenburg County in 1799), and Thomas C. Tabb was a state senator from Norfolk in 1852. Moreover, four men named "John Tabb" served in the Virginia General Assembly, the earliest being John Tabb of Elizabeth City County (1748–1761) followed by this man's son John Tabb who represented Amelia County at various times between 1774 and 1782.

== Early and family life ==
This man may have been born circa 1719. He was the son of John Tabb (1696–1739), a merchant from either Elizabeth City County or Gloucester County across the York River, and his wife Martha Purefoy Hand (1676–1739), who descended from the First Families of Virginia. His great-great-grandfather Humphrey Tabb (son of Thomas Tabb of Welles in England about 22 miles from Bristol) emigrated to the Virginia Colony in 1737, but never attained legislative office. This man's name may have also honored his paternal grandfather Thomas Tabb who lived in Elizabeth City County in the colonial era. His father served as a justice of the peace from York County, but held no colony-wide office. His mother's sister Hannah Hand married Capt. William Marshall of Barbados who became a justice of the peace for Elizabeth city county and helped survey and convey lots in the town of Hampton before he was murdered by sailors circa December 1692 and his widow remarried to Capt. Richard Booker of Gloucester County. His mother's half brother John Lowry was a justice of the peace and surveyor of Elizabeth City and York Counties (hence the probable relation with the revolutionary era Thomas Lowry Tabb). This man's family included brothers Humphrey (possibly a half-brother), William (who married Susannah Gould and died at an advanced age at "Green Valley" plantation in Berkeley County), Edward (1719–1782, who married Lucy Todd, lived in Gloucester County and had sons Philip and Thomas) and John (1721–1743, who lived at "Back River" plantation in Elizabeth City County, and first married the widow Ann Allaman, then married Mary Parsons) and his sisters Martha (born 1703) and Frances Tabb Peyton. Furthermore, his nephew (Edward's son) Philip Tabb (1750–1822) who inherited "Toddsbury" plantation in Gloucester County named his firstborn son (who laer inherited Toddsbury) Thomas Todd Tabb (1782–1835), and his next son John Tabb (b.1784). His brother (Edward's second son) Thomas Tabb (1755–1818, of "Seaford" plantation in Mathews County rose in the Gloucester County militia during the Revolutionary War and named his firstborn son Thomas Teackle Tabb (he died in August 1819 sailing aboard the Philip Tabb from Liverpool to America) Another nephew named Thomas Tabb (b.1753, John's son by his second wife) also lived in Elizabeth City County.

== Career ==
Thomas Tabb became a leading merchant in the colony, and moved to Amelia County around the time of its formation (1735). He and his son John Tabb were partners in the Liverpool mercantile firm Rumbold, Walker and Tabb, which had several stores in Virginia.

Tabb became a justice of the peace in Amelia county, and also served as colonel of the Amelia County militia. Amelia County voters first elected him as one of the men representing them in the House of Burgesses in 1748 (although a court disqualified the other elected man, Wood Jones, so former long-term county clerk Samuel Cobb took his place) and re-elected him for a decade, first alongside Wood Jones, then alongside Richard Booker. Although he was not reelected in 1758, Tabb again won re-election in 1761 and voters re-elected him and Robert Munford every year until his death in 1769.

== Personal life ==
This Thomas Tabb married twice, and acquired land thereby. He first married Elizabeth Marianne Mayo, daughter of Irish emigrant turned major landowner Joseph Mayo and his wife, the former Ann Carrington (also of the First Families of Virginia), but they had no children who survived. After her death, in September 1736, Tabb married the former Rebecca Booker (1710–1769), daughter of Col. Edward Booker. That marriage resulted in twins sons Thomas Tabb (1736–1775) and John Tabb (1736–1796) as well as a daughter. Complicating matters, his son John Tabb's first wife was Elizabeth Marianne Mayo, and that marriage likewise produced no surviving children, but his second marriage to Frances Cooke Peyton (d.1828) did, and John's widow eventually remarried to Virginia politician William Branch Giles (who served as Governor, congressman and U.S. Senator). This man's daughter Mary Marshall Tabb Bolling (1737–1814) became the second wife of burgess Robert Bolling (1730–1775) of "Bollingbrook" plantation near Petersburg, Virginia. That widow is now considered a female patriot because her home was confiscated during the American Revolutionary War.

== Death and legacy ==
Tabb died at his Clay Hill residence in 1769. His son Thomas Tabb would buy another Amelia County plantation in 1769, but died in 1775. Another son, Col. John Tabb, in addition to various legislative stints between 1774 and 1782, served on Amelia county's Committee of Safety during the Revolutionary War and rebuilt the mansion house on Haw Branch plantation, now on the National Register of Historic Places.
