= Winterham (Winterham, Virginia) =

Historic house in Virginia, United States

- U.S. National Register of Historic Places
- Virginia Landmarks Register
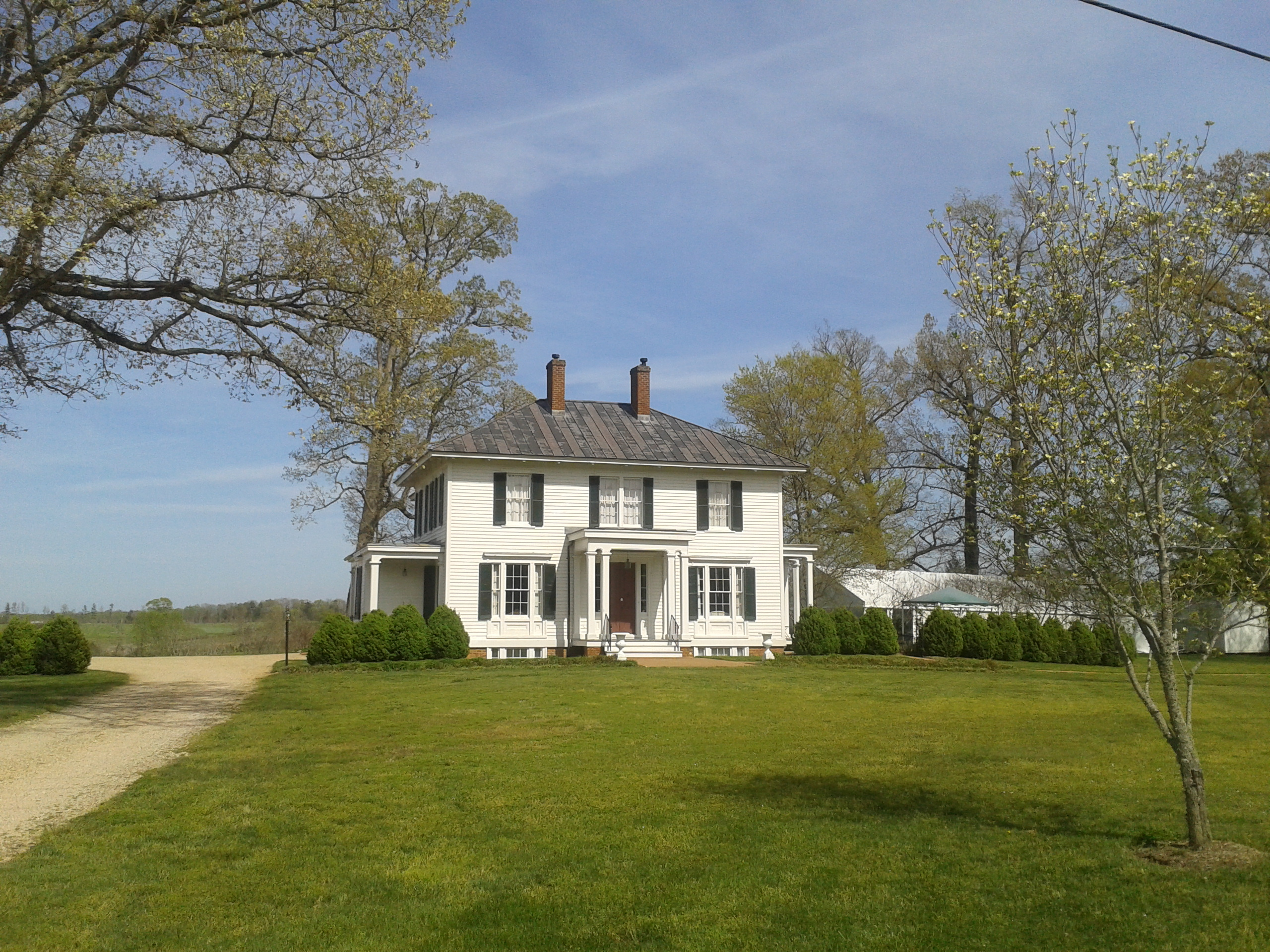
- Winterham in April 2017

- Location within Virginia Location within the United States
- Location: 11440 Grub Hill Church Rd., Winterham and Amelia Courthouse, Virginia
- Coordinates: 37°22′46.1″N 77°58′38.8″W
- Area: 15 acres (6.1 ha)
- Built: 1855
- Architect: Percival, William; Giles, Thomas Tabb
- Architectural style: Italian Villa
- NRHP reference No.: 02001183
- VLR No.: 004-0006

Significant dates
- Added to NRHP: October 15, 2002
- Designated VLR: June 12, 2002

Winterham is a historic plantation house located near Winterham and Amelia Court House, Amelia County, Virginia, on Grub Hill Church Road. It was built about 1855 and is a two-story frame structure with a hipped roof in the Italian villa style. It has four original porches and a cross-hall plan. Also on the property are a contributing late 19th century farm dependency and early 20th century garage.

It is the only known Virginia building by Thomas Tabb Giles, a significant amateur architect, and William Percival, a significant professional architect. Giles was the son of Governor William Branch Giles, who owned Wigwam, another notable historic estate, located several miles north. A set of original architectural drawings for Winterham are housed at the Virginia Historical Society. In the 21st century, the house is privately owned and operated as a bed and breakfast and a venue for catering and weddings.

Winterham was added to the National Register of Historic Places in 2002.
