= John Tabb =

John Tabb may refer to:

- John Tabb (patriot) (1737–1798), Virginia merchant, planter, patriot and politician
- John B. Tabb (1845–1909), American poet, Roman Catholic priest, and professor of English
