= John Tabb (patriot) =

American merchant and politician (d.1769)

Member of the Virginia House of Delegates from Amelia County
- In office May 1782 – May 1783 Serving with Everard Meade
- Preceded by: William Royall
- Succeeded by: Samuel Sherwin (Virginia politician)
- In office October 7, 1776 – May 4, 1777 Serving with John Winn
- Preceded by: position created
- Succeeded by: Thomas Bolling Munford

Member of the Virginia House of Burgesses from Amelia County term_start2 = 1772
- Preceded by: Robert Munford
- Succeeded by: position abolished

Personal details
- Born: 1737 Clay Hill plantation, Amelia County, Colony of Virginia
- Died: 1798 (aged 60–61) 'Clay Hill plantation, Amelia County, Colony of Virginia
- Resting place: >
- Spouse(s): Elizabeth Marianne Mayo; Frances Peyton
- Relations: Rev. John B. Tabb (grandson)
- Children: 2 sons, daughter
- Parent(s): Thomas Tabb, Rebecca Booker
- Education: in England
- Occupation: merchant, planter, politician

John Tabb (1737-1798) was a leading Virginia merchant, as well as a planter, patriot and politician who represented his native Amelia County in the Virginia General Assembly shortly before the American Revolutionary War, during all five Virginia Revolutionary Conventions and at different times between 1774 and 1782. Complicating matters, every generation of this man's family included a man or boy named Thomas Tabb and another named John Tabb, and three men named Thomas Tabb served as Virginia legislators (the earliest being his father) and four men named John Tabb also served, although this man was the only one to serve in both the House of Burgesses and Virginia House of Delegates, as well as the only one who lived outside Virginia's Tidewater region. John Tabb, possibly this man's uncle, represented Elizabeth City County (1748-1761), another John Tabb represented Elizabeth City County in 1779, and Confederate veteran John Newstead Tabb represented Gloucester County in 1891-1892.

== Early life and education ==
This John Tabb was probably born in Amelia County, the son of Rebecca Booker (whose father Edward Booker and brother Edmund Booker had moved to Amelia County) and merchant Thomas Tabb (who moved from Elizabeth City County to then-developing area). The couple married in 1736(her husbands' first wife possibly having died in childbirth), about a year after Virginia's legislature formed Amelia County from parts of Prince George and Brunswick Counties which adjoin the James River in 1735. His grandfather, also John Tabb (1696-1739), was a merchant and operated in Elizabeth City County and Gloucester County across the York River. His paternal grandmother, Martha Purefoy Hand (1676-1739), descended from the First Families of Virginia. He received an education in England appropriate to his class in England. This man had a twin brother Thomas Tabb (1736–1775) and sister Mary Marshall Tabb Bolling (1737–1814) who became the second wife of burgess Robert Bolling (1730–1775) of "Bollingbrook" plantation in Dinwiddie County near Petersburg, Virginia.

== Career ==
This John Tabb and his father were partners in the Liverpool mercantile firm Rumbold, Walker and Tabb, which had several stores in Virginia. As factors, the Virginia merchants bought cured tobacco for sale across the Atlantic Ocean, and sold goods and sometimes enslaved people to their clients. In the 1787 Virginia tax census, this man owned 172 enslaved people under age 16, and 154 above that age, as well as 130 horses, 492 cattle, a four-wheeled chariot and a stud horse in Amelia County. He may also have owned and leased out two young slaves and one enslaved adult and 2 horses in neighboring Prince Edward County, Virginia in that year. Per the estate inventory next mentioned, he may have also owned enslaved people Dinwiddie County, but probably was not the man of the same name who owned slaves in Gloucester County in that same year. About a decade later, (Tabb dying in 1797), he held nearly 25,000 acres in Amelia County, including plantations named "Obslo", "Doolittle", "Grub Hill", "Fairy Wood", "Moulsons", "Coxes", "Clarks", "Lortons" and "Wintercomack, in addition to his residence at Clay Hill, and the now-historic 1,780 acre Haw Branch plantation, Clay Hill. Additionally, John Tabb owned "Monk's Neck" plantation in Dinwiddie County and commercial property in Petersburg,

Amelia County voters first elected this John Tabb as one of their (part-time) representatives in the Virginia General Assembly in 1772, about two years after his father's death, and he served until Governor Dunmore suspended the legislature in 1776. He and John Winn served as Amelia County's representatives to all five Virginia Revolutionary Conventions. Amelia county voters also elected the pair as their first representatives in the new Virginia House of Delegates in 1776. Tabb again ran for (and won) election as a delegate representing Amelia County for a single term in 1782. In addition, Tabb served on Amelia County's Committee of Safety during the Revolutionary War.

== Personal life ==
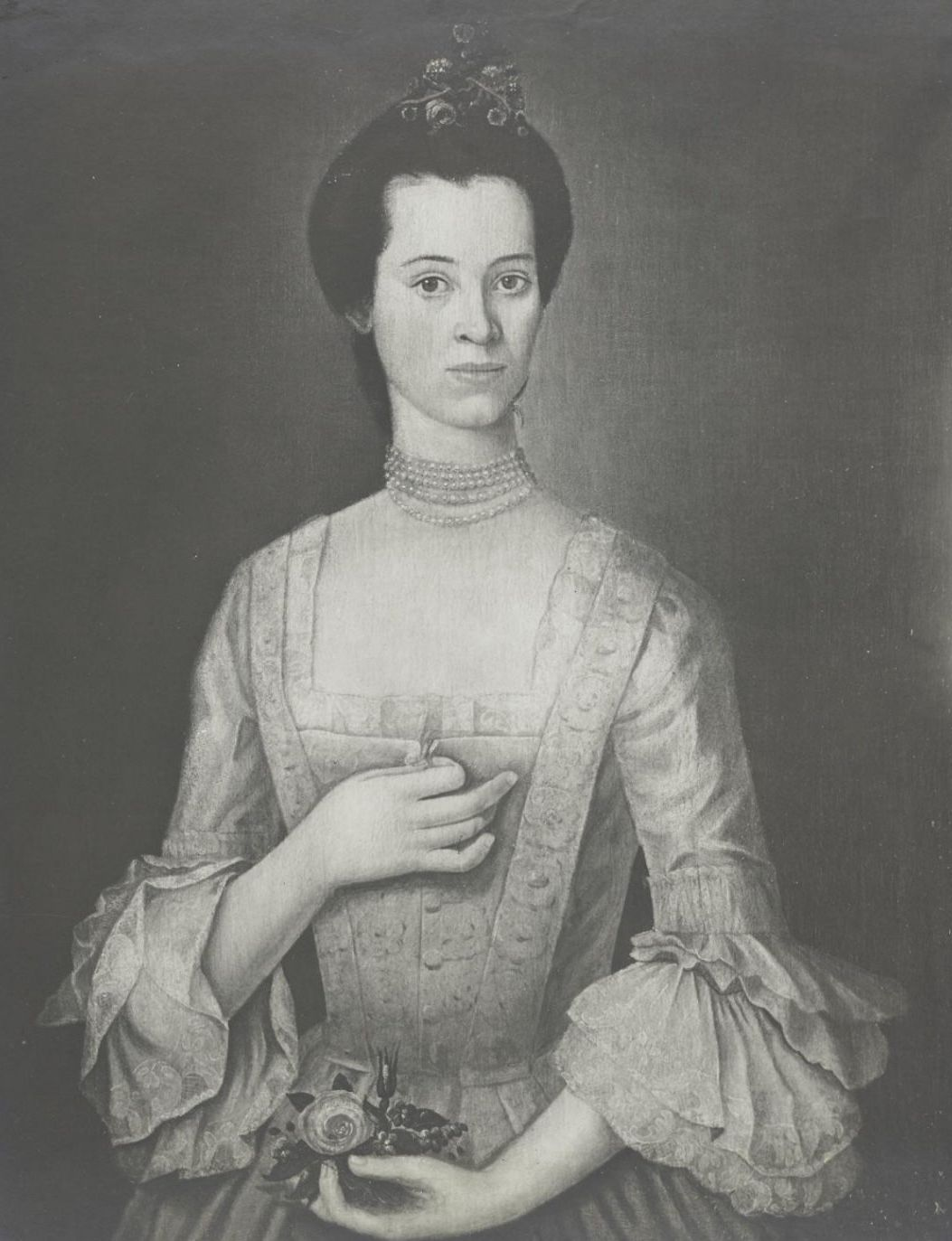
Frances Peyton Tabb, wife of John Tabb. The portrait is attributed to John Durand, 1775 when Mrs. Tabb was 23 years old. Each of the Tabb family females held different flowers in their portraits.

This John Tabb married twice. His first wife was Elizabeth Marianne Mayo, the whose father and brother emigrated from Ireland and became major landowners in the upper reaches of the James River, but that marriage ended with her death, possibly in childbirth but the infant didn't survive. This man then married Frances Cooke Peyton (d.1828), whose father Sir John Peyton was a baronet and prominent landowner in Gloucester County. She bore two sons and a daughter who reached adulthood, and eventually remarried to Virginia politician William Branch Giles (who served as Governor, congressman and U.S. Senator).

== Death and legacy ==
His rebuilt house on Haw Branch plantation is now on the National Register of Historic Places.
