= Rodophil, Virginia =

Unincorporated community in Virginia, United States

- Unincorporated community
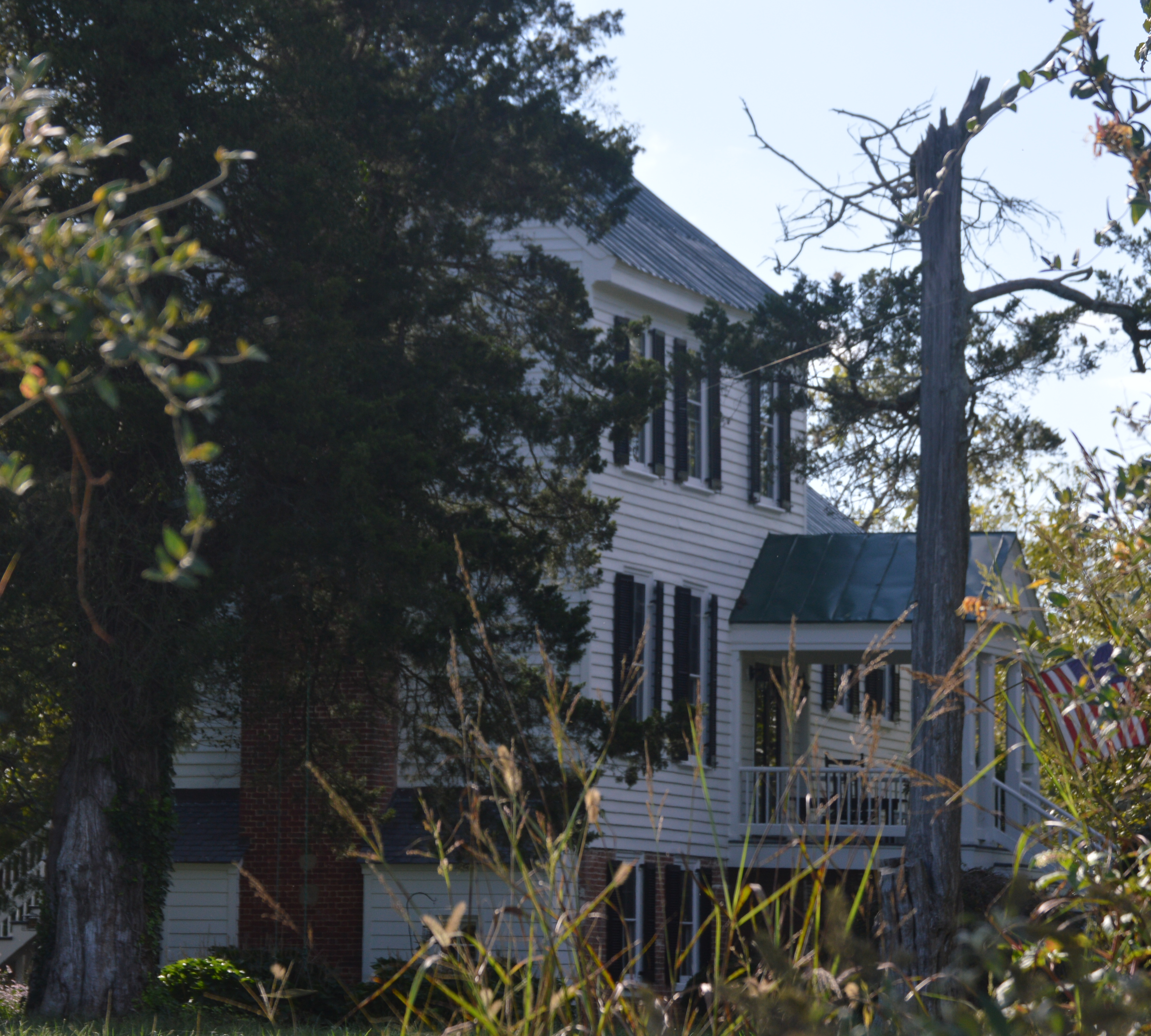
- Front of Ingleside, historic home located at 10920 Rodophil Road

- Location within the Commonwealth of Virginia Rodophil, Virginia (the United States)
- Coordinates: 37°22′06″N 78°09′24.4″W
- Country: United States
- State: Virginia
- County: Amelia
- Elevation: 456 ft (139 m)
- Time zone: UTC−5 (Eastern (EST))
  - Summer (DST): UTC−4 (EDT)
- ZIP codes: 23002, 23083
- Area code: 804
- GNIS feature ID: 1477694

Rodophil is a rural unincorporated community in western Amelia County in the U.S. state of Virginia. It is located in Leigh District at the intersection of SR 616 (S. Genito Road) and the southern terminus of SR 620 (Rodophil Road), straddling the border of ZIP codes 23002 (Amelia Court House, the county seat, 13 miles east by road) and 23083 (Jetersville, 8 miles southeast by road). Rodophil is served by Amelia County Volunteer Fire Department Company 5, in Paineville, 3 miles northeast. A portion of the segment of U.S. Bicycle Route 1 that runs southwest from Richmond follows SR 616 through Rodophil.

== History ==
=== Name ===
At least one 1820 map noted the hamlet as China Grove. Sometime thereafter, it was renamed in honor of Rodophil Jeter (1765–1843), for whose family nearby Jetersville was also named. Rodophil Jeter owned property in the area, and was a delegate to the state legislature in the early 1800s as well as a prominent figure in Amelia County government. Variants (or possibly misspellings) of the name of the community in older sources include "Rhodophil" and "Rodolphil".

=== Early post office ===
Rodophil had its own post office by 1835; the building may have been located on Route 620 across from the entrance to Ingleside, just north of Route 616. Tens of thousands of such small rural postal facilities dotted the American countryside by the late 1800s, and Rodophil continued to be noted as a "post village" or "post-station" in gazetteers at the turn of the 20th century and even into the 1920s. The later references may have been dated, however, since most of these "fourth class" post offices were closed in the early 1900s after the advent of rural free delivery.

=== Civil War ===
During the final days of the Civil War, in the phase known as the Appomattox campaign, contingents of both Union and Confederate soldiers passed through the vicinity, although no significant engagements are documented to have taken place at Rodophil itself. Some of the most desperate fighting of the war, however, occurred in and around western Amelia County, and the last major battle involving General Robert E. Lee's Army of Northern Virginia was fought only a few miles southwest of Rodophil at Sayler's Creek, on the border of Amelia and Prince Edward counties, on April 6, 1865. Lee surrendered to Ulysses S. Grant at Appomattox Court House on April 9.

=== Rosenwald School ===
Reed Rock School, built circa 1923 or 1924, was among at least a dozen Rosenwald Schools constructed between 1917 and 1928 in Amelia County. The particular design for Reed Rock called for a 2‑acre campus with a building to accommodate one teacher. It is unclear exactly where the structure was located, but modern-day Reed Rock Road (SR 621) runs in a broad arc just northwest of Rodophil. During the early 20th century, the Rosenwald project was a collaborative effort that constructed thousands of facilities across the South, primarily to improve the education of African American children. After desegregation, the Rosenwald model became obsolete, and many former Rosenwald properties were demolished or sold.

=== Present-day Rodophil ===
Ingleside (see photo above), a house on Route 620 with connections to the Jeter family, was added to the National Register of Historic Places in 1997.

In 2015 the Virginia Department of Transportation, at a cost of $2.3 million, replaced the bridge that had carried SR 620 (Stony Point Road) over the Appomattox River into Cumberland County. Located approximately 5 miles northwest of Rodophil, it had stood since about 1910, and was one of the last surviving one-lane steel truss bridges in the state.
