= Flat Creek (Virginia) =

Coordinates: 37.39182°N 77.87305°W

- Location within Commonwealth of Virginia Flat Creek (Virginia) (the United States)

Location
- Country: United States

Physical characteristics
- Source
  - location: Burkeville, Virginia
  - elevation: 500 feet (150 m)
- Mouth
  - location: Appomattox River
  - elevation: 180 feet (55 m)
- Length: 34.0 miles (54.7 km)

Basin features
- GNIS ID: 1466649

Flat Creek is a 34.0-mile (54.7 km) right-bank tributary of the Appomattox River in the U.S. state of Virginia. It rises just east of the town of Burkeville in Nottoway County and flows north into Amelia County, then northeast to join the Appomattox River just outside the village of Coverly 28 miles (45 km) northwest of Petersburg.

The name appears as "Flatt Creek" on some 19th-century sources. Amelia Springs, located next to Flat Creek 2 miles north of Jetersville, was a popular resort in pre-Civil War days, and the site of the Battle of Amelia Springs just days before the end of the war in April 1865. The year before, cavalry led by Union general August Kautz had conducted raids against the Richmond and Danville Railroad, and Confederate defenders clashed with Kautz's forces at the bridge over Flat Creek just north of Chula on May 14.

== Tributaries ==
Listed in order, beginning at mouth:

Name	Bank	County
Barkhouse Branch	Right	Amelia
Horsepen Branch	Left	Amelia
Nibbs Creek	Right	Amelia
Wildcat Branch	Left	Amelia
Walker Branch	Left	Amelia
Haw Branch	Left	Amelia
Horsepen Creek	Left	Amelia
Beaverpond Creek	Right	Amelia
Neal's Creek	Left	Amelia
Little Creek	Left	Amelia
Vaughn's Creek	Right	Amelia
Webster's Creek	Left	Amelia
Walnut Branch	Left	Amelia
Little Creek	Right	Amelia
Ellis Creek	Left	Nottoway

== See also ==
- List of rivers of Virginia
