= Winterham, Virginia =

Unincorporated community in Virginia, United States

- Unincorporated community
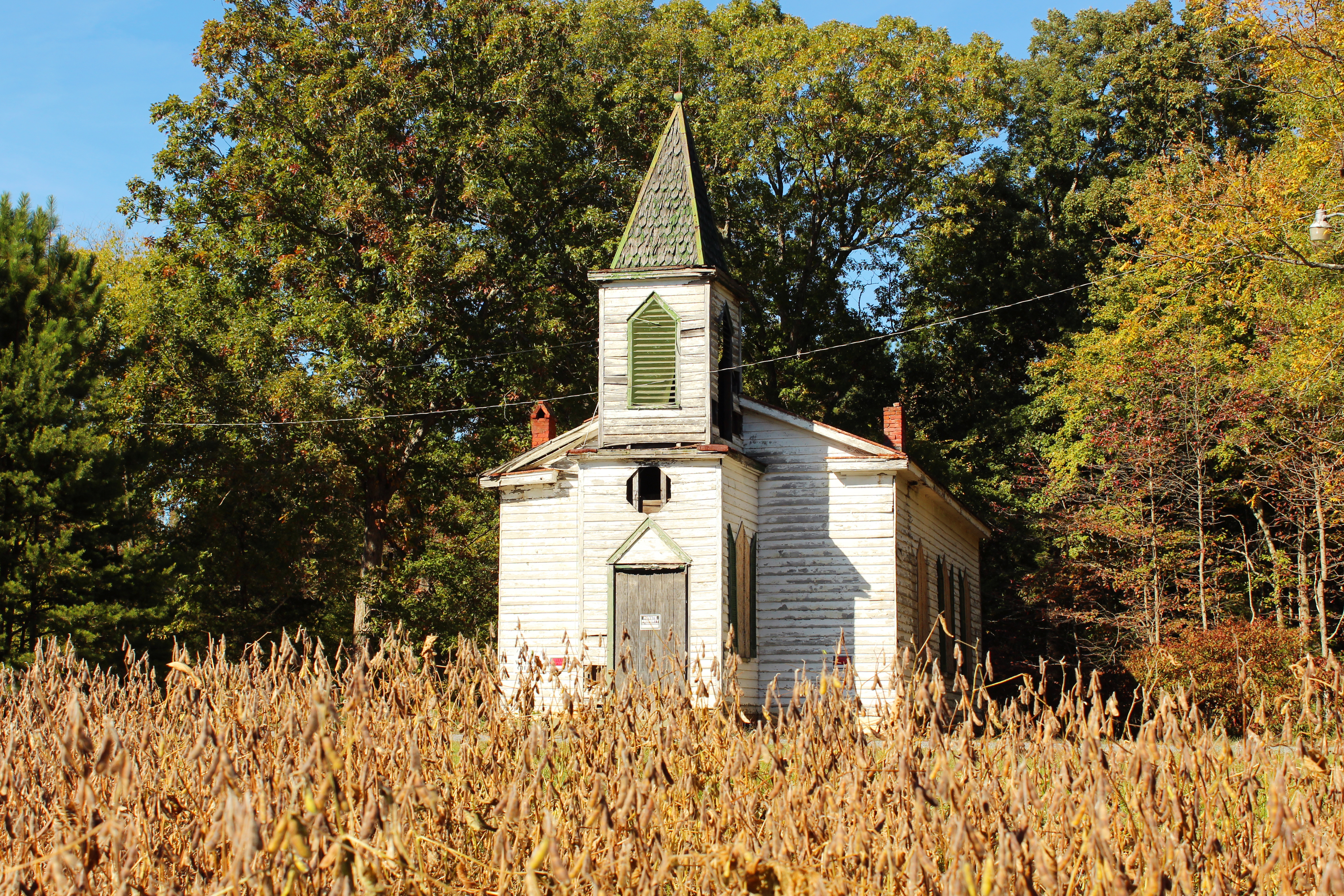
- Mt. Herman Presbyterian Church building, before restoration

- Location within the Commonwealth of Virginia Winterham, Virginia (the United States)
- Coordinates: 37°22′4″N 77°55′53″W
- Country: United States
- State: Virginia
- County: Amelia
- Elevation: 338 ft (103 m)
- Time zone: UTC−5 (Eastern (EST))
  - Summer (DST): UTC−4 (EDT)
- ZIP code: 23002
- Area code: 804
- GNIS feature ID: 1477890

Winterham (also called "Ham", according to the USGS) is a mostly rural unincorporated community in central Amelia County in the U.S. state of Virginia, lying along US 360 at the northern terminus of SR 628 (Butlers Road). Its elevation is 338 feet (103 m) above sea level. Winterham is served by the volunteer fire department and post office at the county seat, Amelia Court House (ZIP code 23002), approximately 3 miles southwest.

== History ==
=== Name and origin ===
"Winterham" is one of the oldest surviving place‑names in Amelia County, dating back at least to the mid-1700s. Its precise origin is unclear, but the suffix "-ham" derives from Scots hame or Old English hām, meaning "home", "estate", or "village". The earliest uses of "Winterham" probably referred not to the town but to the Winterham Plantation, approximately 4 miles northwest, whose manor house and dependencies were added to the National Register of Historic Places in 2002. A post office was established at the town of Winterham by 1853, and by the early 1900s the town was a freight stop, at Milepost 34, on what was then the Southern Railway, originally the Richmond and Danville Railroad. The railroad station and post office have since closed, although the railroad track, which parallels US 360 before the highway curves southeastward at Winterham, is still used by freight trains, and is now owned by the Norfolk Southern Railway.

=== African American churches ===
Mt. Olive Baptist, a historic African American church, is located 1/2 mile northeast of Winterham on SR 705 (Mt. Olive Lane, a short loop segment of old US 360). Just to the east, also on Route 705, Mt. Herman Presbyterian was once the meeting place of a separate African American congregation. Built in the late 1800s, the structure had fallen into disrepair (see photo) before being privately renovated in 2020. Church of the Holy Cross, a Reformed Episcopal congregation, was meeting regularly in the restored building as of 2023.

=== Morefield Mine ===
Morefield Mine, one of several rock and gem mines that have been worked profitably in Amelia County, is located on Route 628 approximately 1 mile southeast of Winterham, atop an unusually long and thick vein of pegmatite that contains a number of rare minerals. Since its opening in 1929, Morefield Mine has provided mica, feldspar, and gems, many of museum quality, operating intermittently as a working mine, tourist attraction, and sometimes both simultaneously. Amelia County contains some of the most extensive mica and feldspar deposits in Virginia.
