= Deatonville, Virginia =

Unincorporated community in Virginia, United States

- Unincorporated community
- Location within the Commonwealth of Virginia Deatonville, Virginia (the United States)
- Coordinates: 37°19′42″N 78°10′03″W
- Country: United States
- State: Virginia
- County: Amelia
- Elevation: 459 ft (140 m)
- Time zone: UTC−5 (Eastern (EST))
  - Summer (DST): UTC−4 (EDT)
- ZIP codes: 23083, 23966
- Area code: 804
- FIPS code: 51-21680
- GNIS feature ID: 1477253

Deatonville is a rural unincorporated community in the western part of Amelia County in the U.S. state of Virginia. It is located in Leigh District along SR 616 (S. Genito Road) at its junctions with SR 617 (E. Sayler's Creek Road to the west, St. James Road east). Deatonville straddles the boundary between ZIP codes 23083 (Jetersville) and 23966 (Rice). One segment of U.S. Bicycle Route 1 runs southwest from Richmond; this segment follows the entire length of SR 616 through Amelia County and passes through Deatonville.

== History ==
=== Name & post office ===
For a time, in the early 1800s, the community was called Thompson's Tavern. A post office, originally with the spelling "Deatonsville", was first established in 1812 or 1813. It was one of the earliest in Amelia County, and, like many rural mail facilities of the era, operated only intermittently at first. By the late 1800s, tens of thousands of such small post offices dotted the American countryside, and Deatonville continued to be noted as a post village (often listed with the alternative spelling) in gazetteers at the turn of the 20th century and even into the 1920s. The latter reference likely was dated, however, since most of these "fourth class" postal facilities were closed in the early 1900s after the advent of rural free delivery.

=== Sandy Creek Church ===
Sandy Creek Baptist Church, on Route 617, claims to be the oldest Baptist church in Amelia County and one of the oldest in the state, having been established in 1771. The original one-room building survived the Civil War but burned down in 1908. The current structure was dedicated in 1910, and has been expanded since. In 2022 the pastor, Tom Campbell, was killed on his way to the church when his motorcycle was struck by another vehicle.

=== Civil War ===
Deatonville lies along the route followed by Confederate general Robert E. Lee and his army in their westward retreat during the Civil War, just days before the surrender to Ulysses S. Grant at Appomattox on April 9, 1865. Some of the most desperate fighting of the war occurred near Deatonville. Numerous roadside historical marker signs line the route, including one at Deatonville that reads as follows:

During this day [April 6], the entire Confederate line [marched] west on the Rice–Deatonville Road toward Farmville. Constantly pressing Lee's rearguard, Union troops [fought] a brief action at every turn. These delays would eventually lead to the Battle of [Sayler's] Creek.

A historical plaque at Deatonville provides more extensive details.

=== Rosenwald School ===
St. James School, built between 1917 and 1920, was among the first of at least a dozen Rosenwald Schools constructed between 1917 and 1928 in Amelia County. The particular design for St. James called for a building to accommodate two teachers. The school was located on Route 617 (modern-day St. James Road) east of Deatonville, but is no longer standing. During the early 20th century, the Rosenwald project was a collaborative effort that constructed thousands of facilities across the segregated South primarily to help improve the education of African American children. After integration, the Rosenwald model became obsolete, and many former Rosenwald properties were demolished or sold.

=== Historic structures ===
Wootton House, built around 1850, is an I-house with Gothic Revival elements. The property, along with its associated structures, is among several sites in the Deatonville area that were studied in the 1990s for possible listing on the National Register of Historic Places. Farmer House, several miles south of Deatonville, was added to the Register in 1978.
