= Chula, Virginia =

Unincorporated community in Virginia, United States

- Unincorporated community
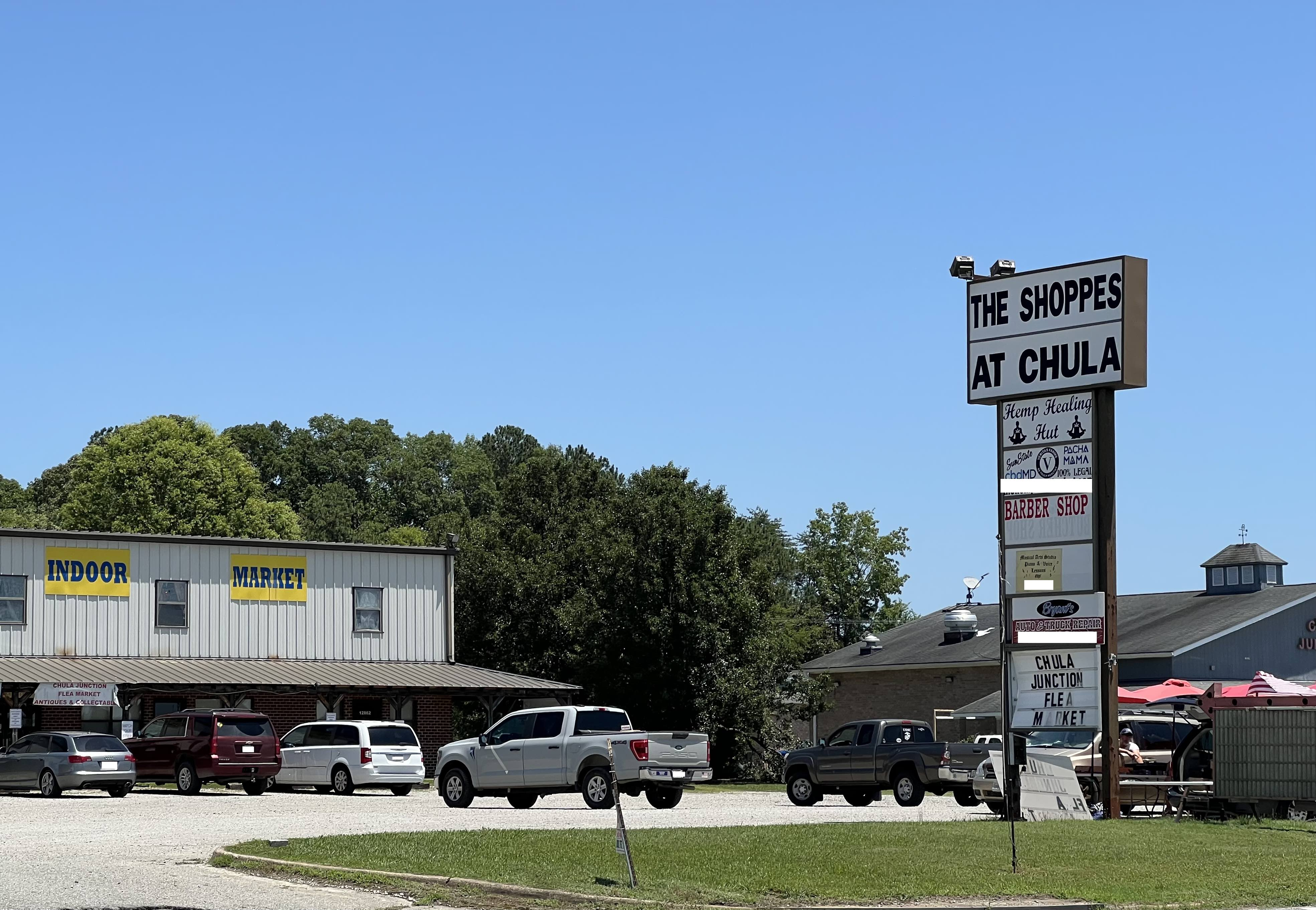
- Stores in Chula.

- Location within the Commonwealth of Virginia Chula, Virginia (the United States)
- Coordinates: 37°23′19″N 77°54′11″W
- Country: United States
- State: Virginia
- County: Amelia
- Elevation: 289 ft (88 m)
- Time zone: UTC−5 (Eastern (EST))
  - Summer (DST): UTC−4 (EDT)
- ZIP code: 23002
- Area code: 804
- FIPS code: 51/16656
- GNIS feature ID: 1492767

Chula is a mostly rural unincorporated community in the northeastern part of Amelia County just west of the Appomattox River in the U.S. state of Virginia. The town is centered around the T-intersection of SR 636 (Lodore Road) and SR 740 (Old Chula Road) in Giles District. Chula is just west of SR 604 (Chula Road), which includes a short bypass segment built around the town in the late 20th century. The area is served by the post office 7 miles (10 km) southwest at Amelia Court House, ZIP code 23002. The nearest fire station to Chula is Amelia County Volunteer Fire Department Station 4, near Mattoax, 3 miles (5 km) north.

== History ==
=== Origins ===
The word "Chula" was likely derived from a Native American word meaning "fox" or "red fox". The town apparently was founded in the 1850s as a stop on the recently completed rail line from the state capital: Chula is notably absent on a map of Amelia County circa 1850; but a postal facility using the name "Chula Depot" was established in 1857, and an 1860 map shows the town as a stop on the new Richmond and Danville Railroad. As of about 1900, after the R&D RR had been acquired by Southern Railway, Chula was still both a railroad stop and a post village, and "Chula Depot" and "Chula Station" continued to appear as alternative labels well into the 20th century. The Chula post office, upon closing in 1955, had been managed by the same postmaster for nearly 40 years and was the second-largest in Amelia County, after the one at the courthouse. The railroad track is still used, although in modern times only by freight trains; it crosses Route 636 at the main T‑intersection in Chula and is now owned by the Norfolk Southern Railway.

=== Civil War ===
During the Civil War, railroads formed a critical supply network for the Confederacy, and thus their destruction was a key component of Union strategy. Among the raids targeting the Richmond and Danville Railroad were those conducted in 1864 by cavalry under Union general August Kautz. Federal troops destroyed Chula Depot on March 13, but it was rebuilt. Confederate defenders clashed with Kautz's forces at Flat Creek Bridge, just north of Chula, on May 14.

=== Tornadoes ===
Amelia County is located in a small Central Virginia tornado alley and has had numerous tornado touchdowns. Tornadoes of note include the April 30, 1924, twister that passed east of the courthouse area, traveling from Jetersville to the Chula vicinity, killing one person and injuring seven others on the way.

=== Chula School ===
Through the mid-20th century, Chula School was among the educational facilities serving African American children in Amelia County in the era before desegregation. A structure noted as historic Chula School stood approximately 2 miles (3 km) south of town on what is now SR 683 (Chula School Road).

=== Existing historic places ===
Dykeland plantation, Egglestetton plantation, Grub Hill Church, and The Wigwam are among the historic sites around Chula that are listed on the National Register of Historic Places.
