= Dykeland =

Historic house in Virginia, United States

- U.S. National Register of Historic Places
- Virginia Landmarks Register
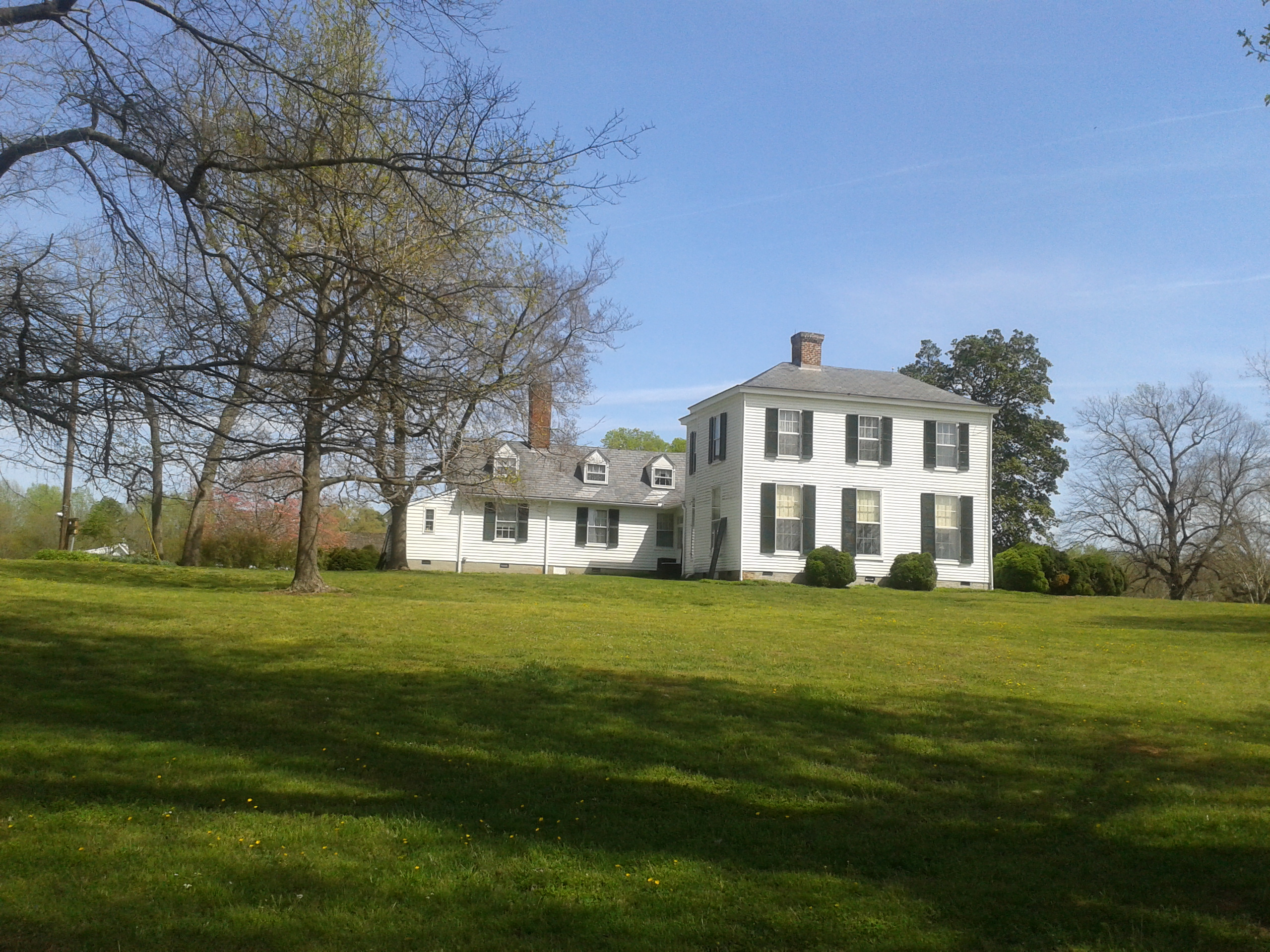
- Dykeland in April, 2017

- Location within Virginia Location within the United States
- Location: VA 632, Chula, Virginia
- Coordinates: 37°24′21″N 77°54′31″W
- Area: 6 acres (2.4 ha)
- Built: 1838, 1856-1857
- Architectural style: Italianate
- NRHP reference No.: 87000721
- VLR No.: 004-0009

Significant dates
- Added to NRHP: May 8, 1987
- Designated VLR: March 17, 1987

Dykeland is a historic home located near Chula, Amelia County, Virginia. It is a two-story, wood-frame house reflecting two architectural styles and three periods of construction. It consists of a two-story vernacular section built about 1838 and attached 1 1/2-story rear wing dating to the early-19th century. A two-story Italianate section dates to 1856-1857 and features a hipped roof. A one-story Italianate-style porch unifies the two sections. Also on the property are a contributing smokehouse and shed.

It was added to the National Register of Historic Places in 1987.
