= Farmer House (Deatonville, Virginia) =

Historic house in Virginia, United States

- U.S. National Register of Historic Places
- Virginia Landmarks Register
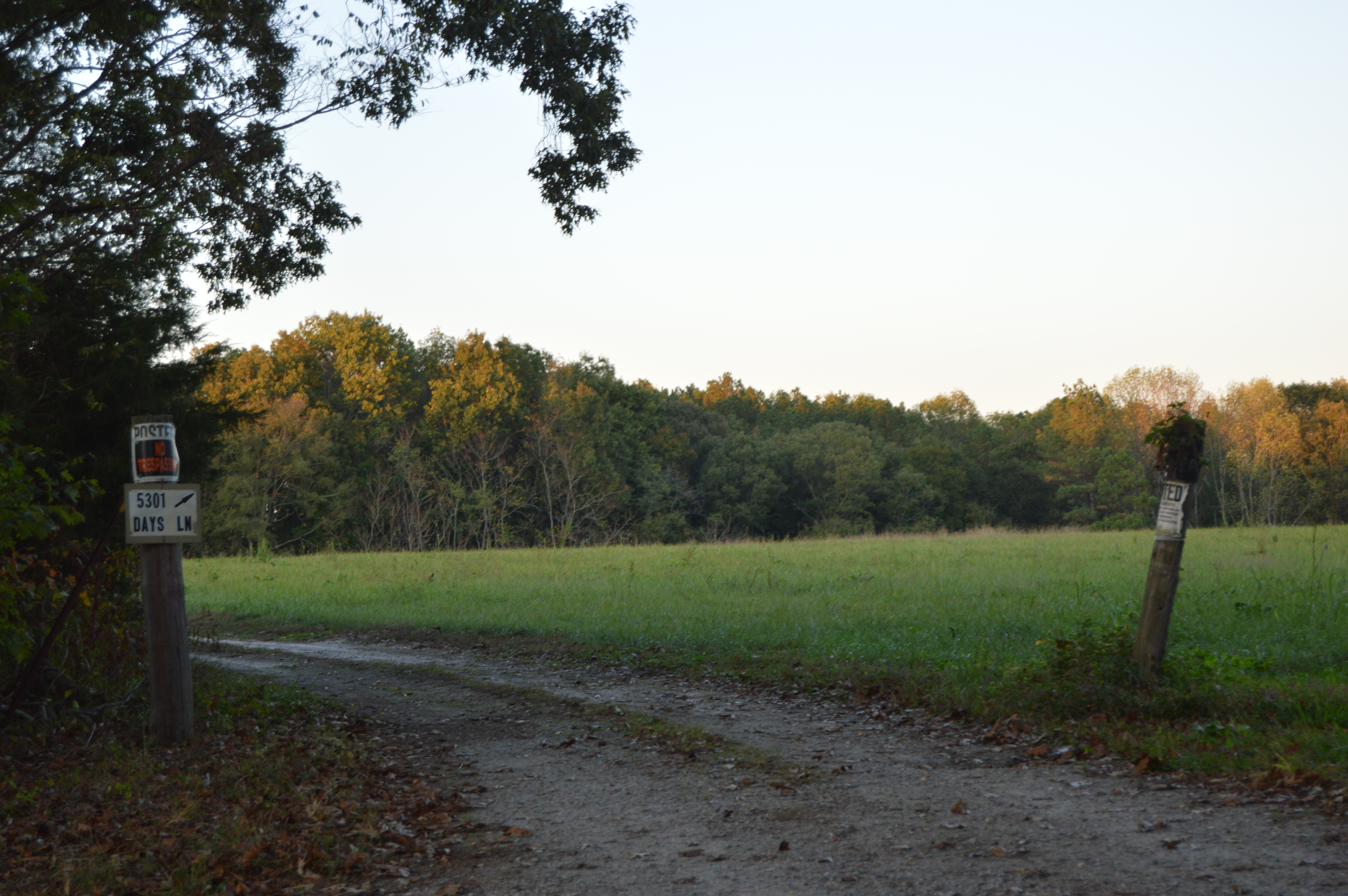
- Entrance to the property

- Location within Virginia Location within the United States
- Location: Jennings Ordinary Road, 3 miles (4.8 km) southeast of Deatonville, Virginia
- Coordinates: 37°17′9″N 78°9′22″W
- Area: 12 acres (4.9 ha)
- Built: c. 1820
- NRHP reference No.: 78003004
- VLR No.: 004-0043

Significant dates
- Added to NRHP: November 17, 1978
- Designated VLR: April 18, 1978

Farmer House is a historic home located near Deatonville, Amelia County, Virginia. It was built about 1820, and is a two-story, five-bay frame dwelling with brick end chimneys. It has a one-bay pedimented front porch. Also on the property are two additional contributing buildings.

It was added to the National Register of Historic Places in 1978.
