= Ingleside (Amelia Courthouse, Virginia) =

Historic house in Virginia, United States

- U.S. National Register of Historic Places
- Virginia Landmarks Register
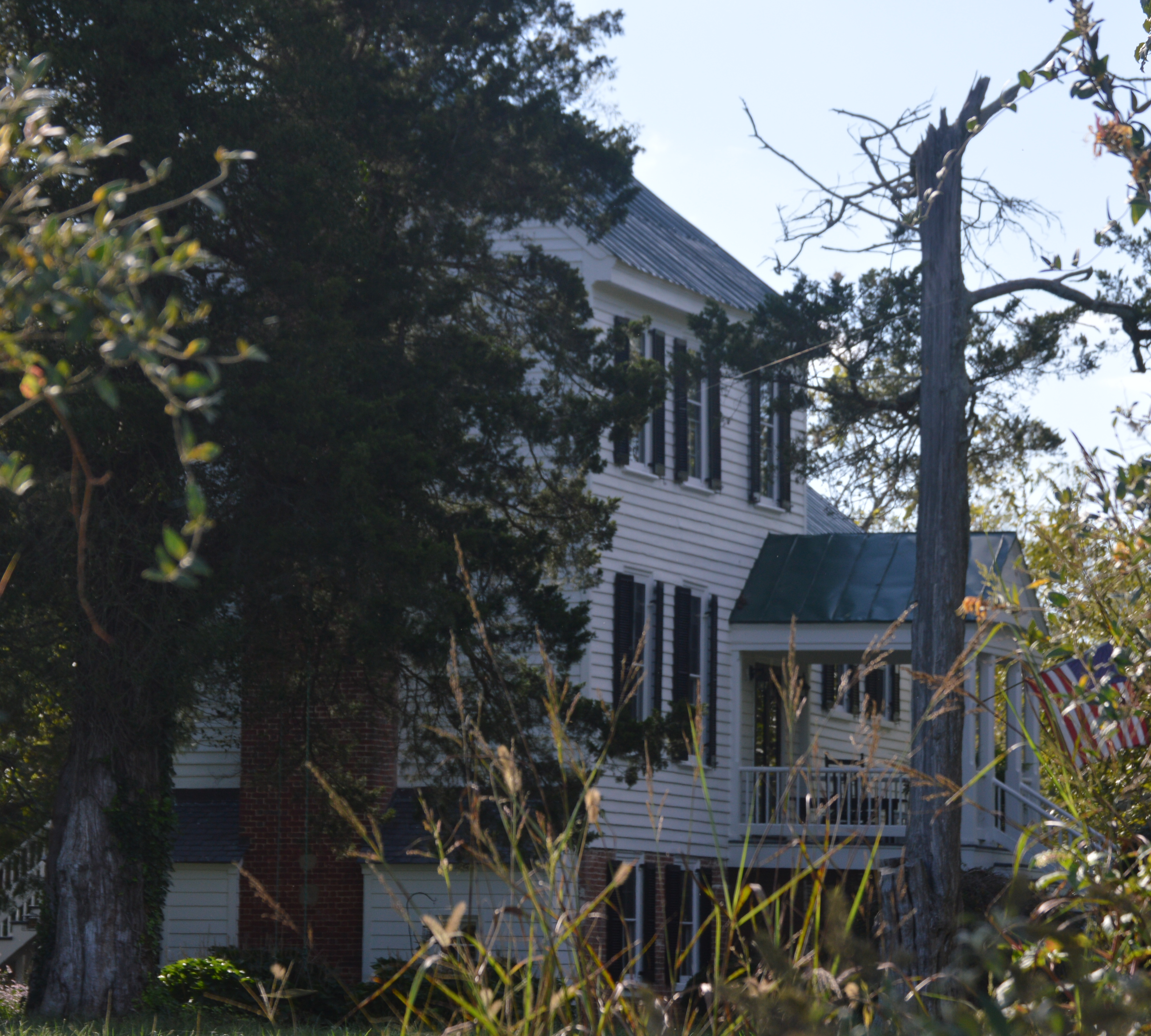
- Front of the house

- Location within Virginia Location within the United States
- Location: 10920 Rodophil Rd., Rodophil, Virginia
- Coordinates: 37°22′12″N 78°09′34″W
- Area: 48 acres (19 ha)
- Built: 1824
- Architectural style: Federal
- NRHP reference No.: 97001071
- VLR No.: 004-0057

Significant dates
- Added to NRHP: September 12, 1997
- Designated VLR: July 2, 1997

Ingleside is a historic home located at 10920 Rodophil Road (SR 620) in Rodophil, an unincorporated community in western Amelia County, Virginia. The main section of the house was built about 1824, and is a 2 1/2-story, single-pile frame building. It has a two-story, single-pile frame addition added about 1840. The house is in a late Federal style. Also on the property are a contributing two-story frame hay barn (c. 1920) sheathed in weatherboard and a 2 1/2-story frame tobacco barn (c. 1910).

It was added to the National Register of Historic Places in 1997.
