= Egglestetton =

Historic house in Virginia, United States

- U.S. National Register of Historic Places
- Virginia Landmarks Register
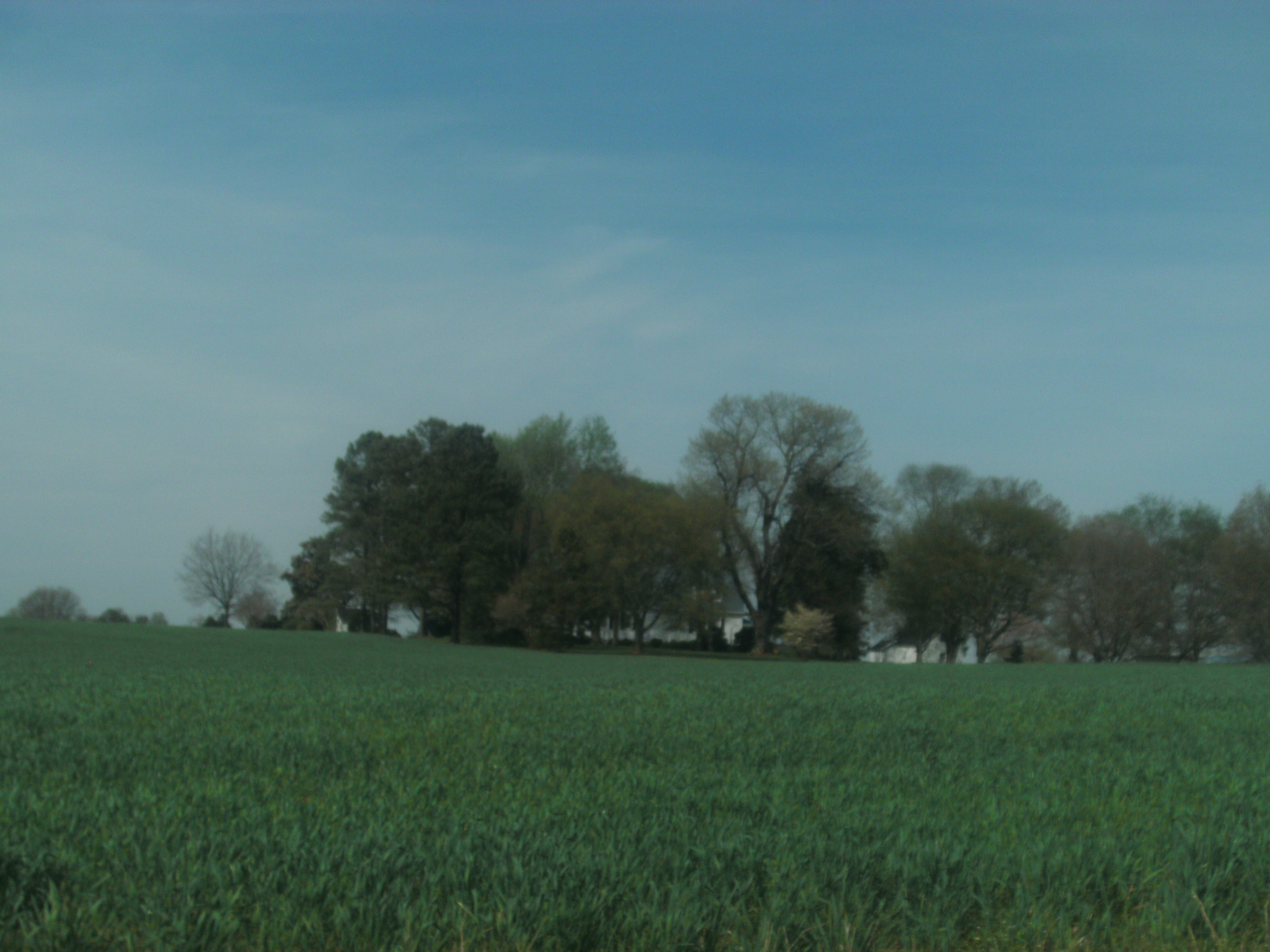
- Egglestetton, seen in April 2017

- Location within Virginia Location within the United States
- Location: Northwest of Chula, Chula, Virginia
- Coordinates: 37°23′52″N 77°59′07″W
- Area: 16 acres (6.5 ha)
- NRHP reference No.: 80004167
- VLR No.: 004-0005

Significant dates
- Added to NRHP: March 28, 1980
- Designated VLR: June 17, 1975

Egglestetton is a historic plantation house located near Chula, Amelia County, Virginia. It was built about 1799, and is a 1 1/2-story, five-bay, frame dwelling with a gambrel roof. It has a Central-passage plan and has beaded weatherboard siding. The house was extensively restored in 1972–1973. Also on the property is an early 19th-century kitchen. It was built for planter and Congressman Joseph Eggleston (1754-1811).

It was added to the National Register of Historic Places in 1980.
