= St. John's Church (Chula, Virginia) =

Historic church in Virginia, US

- U.S. National Register of Historic Places
- Virginia Landmarks Register
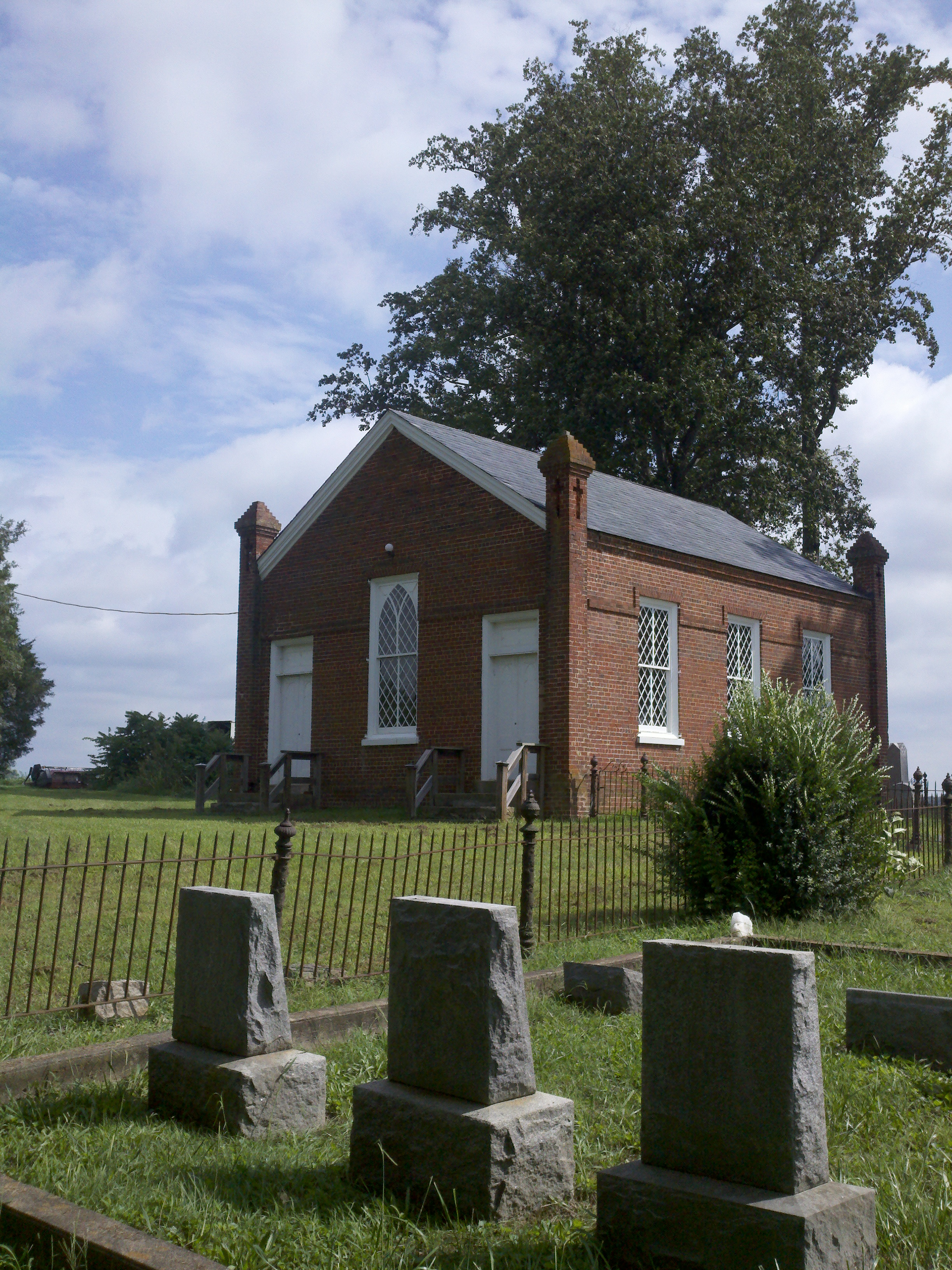
- Grub Hill Church, September 2012

- Location within Virginia Location within the United States
- Location: 3.8 mi (6 km) west of Chula on VA 609, Chula, Virginia
- Coordinates: 37°23′59.5″N 77°58′12.3″W
- Area: 1.5 acres (0.61 ha)
- Built: 1852
- Architectural style: Gothic Revival
- NRHP reference No.: 78003003
- VLR No.: 004-0007

Significant dates
- Added to NRHP: November 16, 1978
- Designated VLR: April 18, 1978

St. John's Church, commonly known as Grub Hill Church, is a historic Episcopalian church in rural Amelia County, in the U.S. state of Virginia. It is located on SR 609 (Grub Hill Church Road) just south of SR 636 (N. Lodore Road), between the communities of Amelia Court House and Chula. "Grub Hill" is an obsolete place-name derived from the "Grub Hill" slave quarters of the Tabb family, who donated the land for the construction of an Episcopal church. Grub Hill Church was originally established on the site in the mid-1700s; the current structure was built in 1852, and consists of a one-story gable-roofed brick structure in a vernacular Gothic Revival style.

Currently owned by Christ Episcopal Church of Amelia Court House, St. John's is still used by the parish for occasional services, including the Eucharist in May and October.

The church was added to the National Register of Historic Places in 1978.
