= Haw Branch =

Historic plantation house located near Amelia Court House, Amelia County, Virginia

- U.S. National Register of Historic Places
- Virginia Landmarks Register
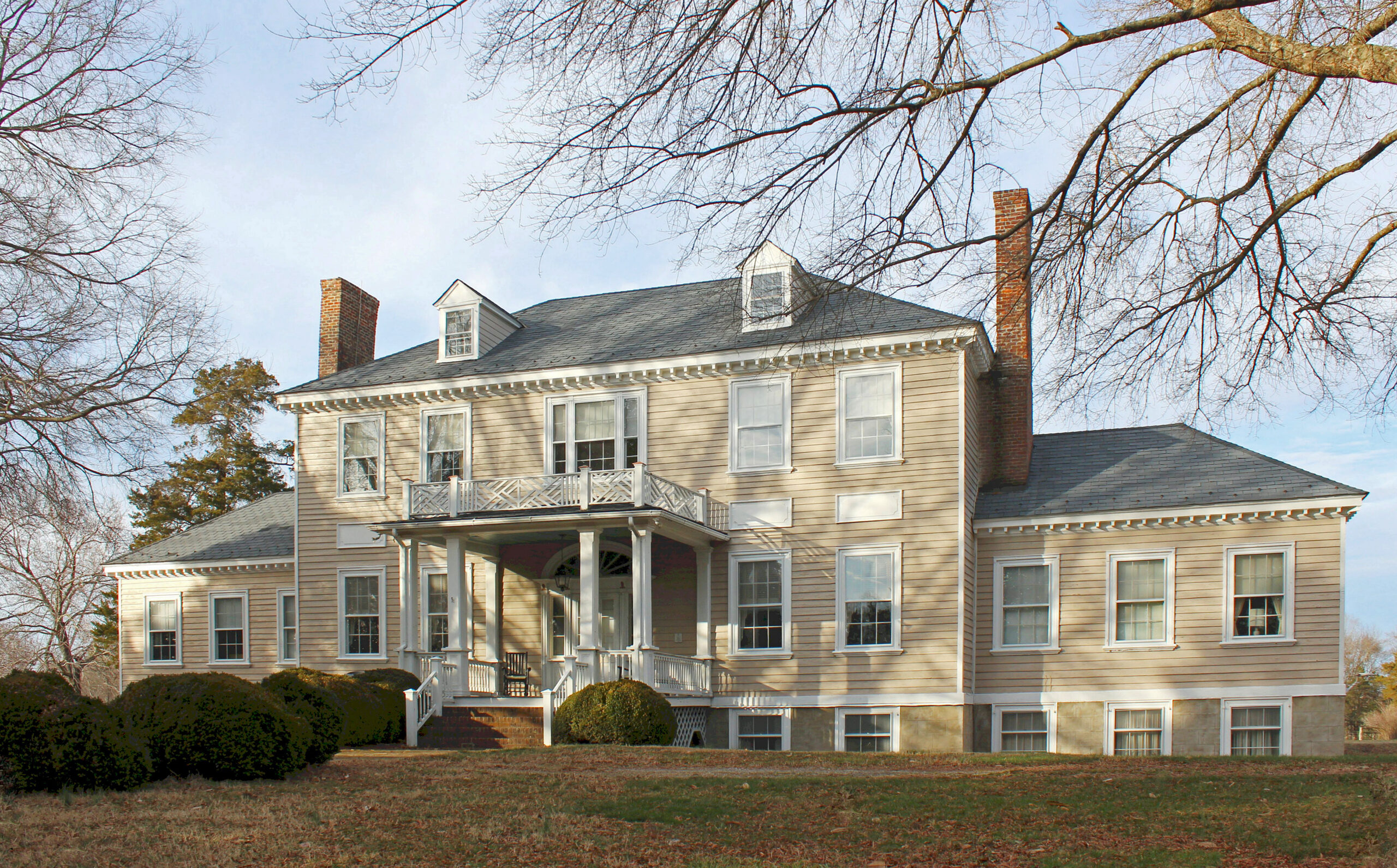
- Haw Branch in 2023

- Location within Virginia Location within the United States
- Location: Off SR 667, north of Amelia Court House, Virginia
- Coordinates: 37.4107°N 78.0203°W
- Built: c. 1745, c. 1815
- Architectural style: Federal
- NRHP reference No.: 73001992
- VLR No.: 004-0002

Significant dates
- Added to NRHP: April 2, 1973
- Designated VLR: October 17, 1972

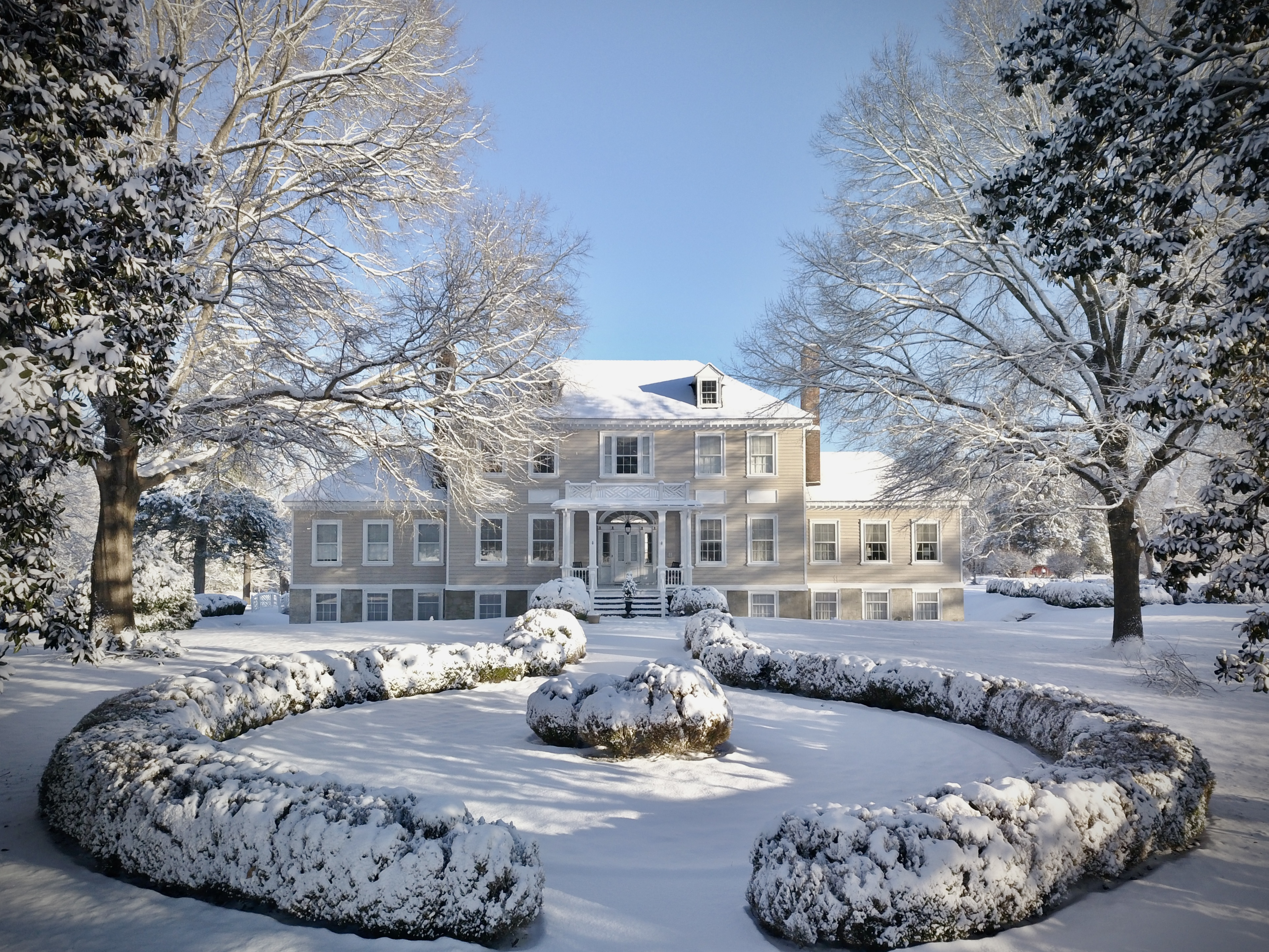
Haw Branch in January 2025

Haw Branch is an historic plantation house located in Amelia County, Virginia, United States. The plantation was established by Thomas Tabb, a wealthy merchant who moved to Amelia from Gloucester County, Virginia in the mid 1730s. In 1745 he was taxed on a mansion house at Haw Branch, but actually lived at another plantation in Amelia County, called Clay Hill. Thomas Tabb represented Amelia County in the House of Burgesses and also served as sheriff, justice of the peace and Colonel of the Militia. After Tabb died in 1767, his son John Tabb inherited Haw Branch and built the current manor house, as well as increased Tabb holdings in Amelia to include eleven plantations. The younger Tabb also served in local office, as Colonel of the Militia, was one of eleven members of the Virginia Committee of Safety, and continued to serve in the Virginia House of Delegates. By Tabb's death in 1797, the total of his Amelia County holdings was nearly 25,000 acres and included Obslo, Doolittle, Grub Hill, Fairy Wood, Moulsons, Coxes, Clarks, Lortons, Wintercomack, Haw Branch and the home plantation, Clay Hill. Additionally, John Tabb owned Monk's Neck plantation in Dinwiddie County, commercial property in Petersburg, and partial ownership in a Liverpool trading firm named Rumbold, Walker, and Tabb.

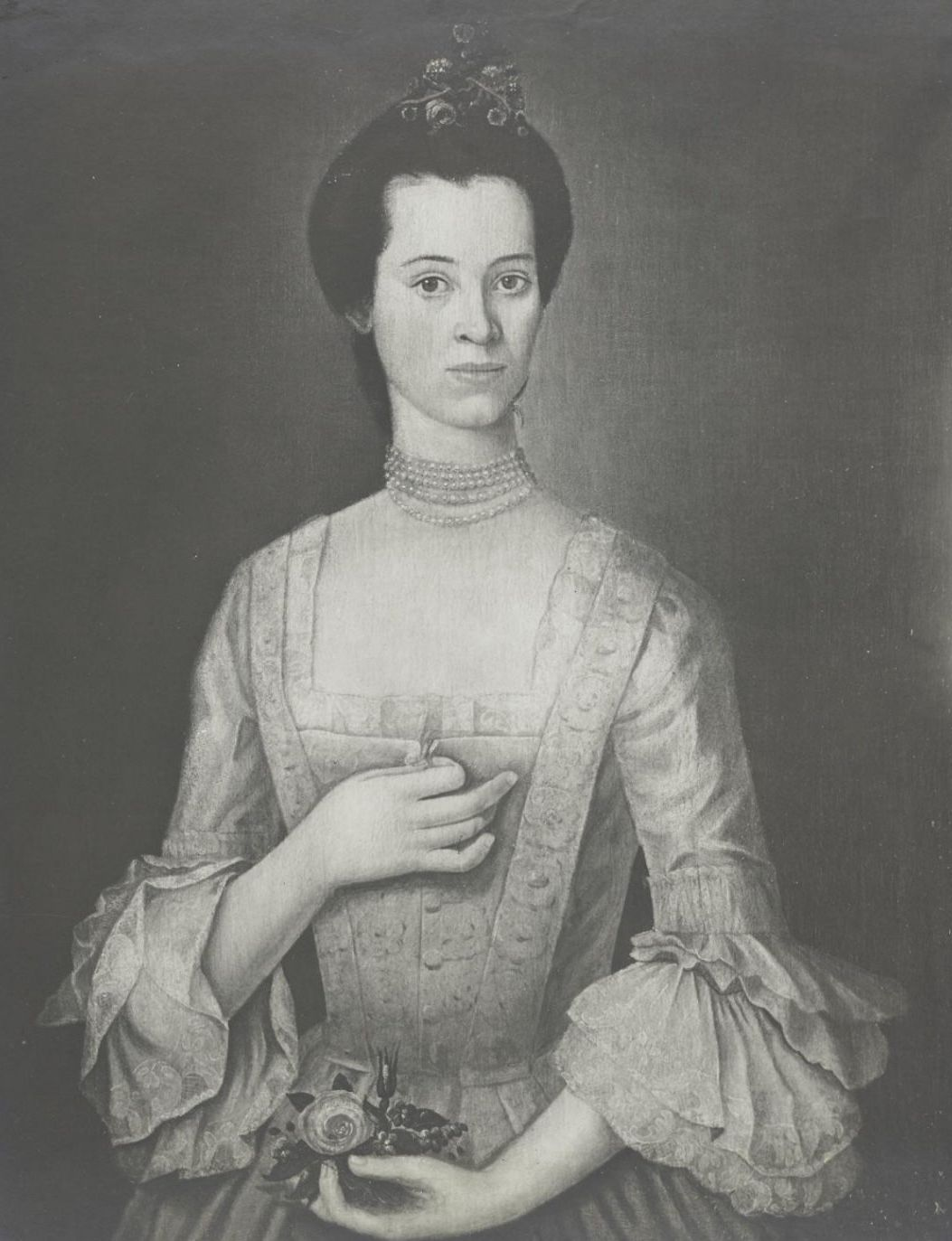
Frances Peyton Tabb, wife of John Tabb. The portrait is attributed to John Durand, 1775 when Mrs. Tabb was 23 years old. Each of the Tabb family females held different flowers in their portraits.

John Tabb's youngest daughter, Marianna Elizabeth Tabb inherited Haw Branch upon her father's death. At the time, the plantation consisted of approximately 1,780 acres. Marianna married William Jones Barksdale and in 1815 the two substantially modified the dwelling at Haw Branch to its current appearance. The remodeling was completed in 1818 and is substantiated by a date brick in the west chimney. William Jones Barksdale was the scion of William Barksdale, builder of Strawberry Bank in Petersburg. Strongly connected to England, William Jones Barksdale attended Eton and Cambridge for his education. Contemporary comments about Barksdale indicated frequent trips on business to Philadelphia, New York, London, and Paris. Furnishings from some of these trips remains in Haw Branch today including a hall table from the workshop of Duncan Phyfe. In 1827 Barksdale attempted to sell Haw Branch and leave Amelia County, for reasons unknown, but the auction was never held. At the time, the plantation included domestic (slave) houses, stables, a new threshing barn, six large tobacco barns, and 120 enslaved individuals.

In 1837, William Jones Barksdale joined Abraham Warwick in a partnership to run the Gallego Mill in Richmond. The two built the largest flour mill in the south and built a fleet of 36 brigs to ship flour to foreign ports. Return cargo was primarily guano and coffee. By the 1850s Warwick & Barksdale was the nation's leading coffee importer and the second largest flour exporter.

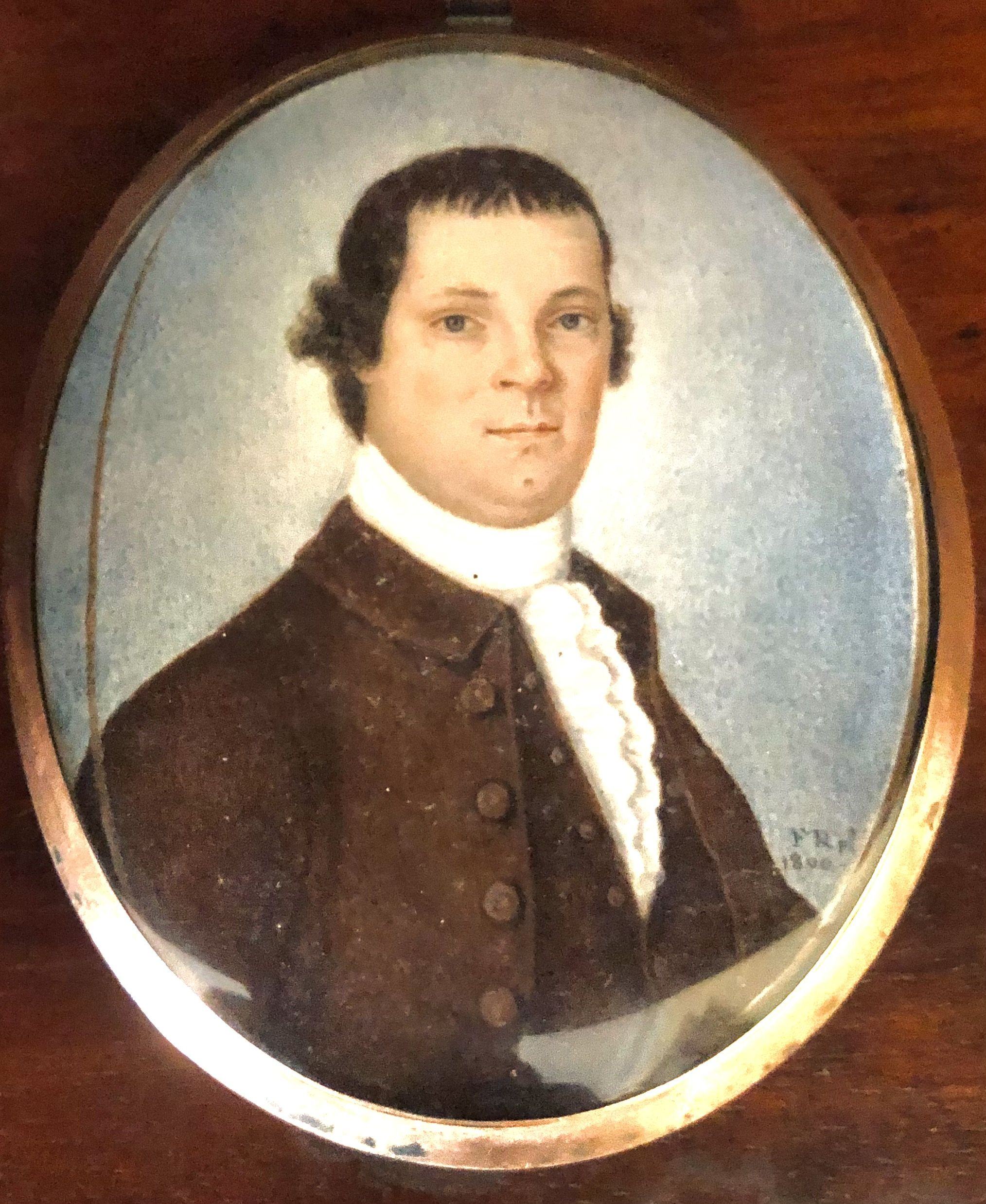
A miniature portrait of John Tabb completed in 1800, three years after his death

William Jones Barksdale and his wife Marianna moved from Haw Branch to the main family house Clay Hill, upon the death of her mother, Francis Cook Peyton Tabb ca. 1828. Francis Tabb was the widow of Col. John Tabb. Clay Hill remained the principle seat of the Tabb/Barksdale/Mason family until it burned in January of 1861. It is not known who occupied Haw Branch during the 1830s and 1840s but in 1852 the only Barksdale daughter, Sarah Harriet (Hal) Barksdale, married John Young Mason Jr., a purser in the U.S. Navy. The two resided at Haw Branch. John Young Mason Jr. died on November 14, 1862 at age 38. Harriet Mason continued living at Haw Branch through the Civil War. On April 5, 1865 Union cavalry rode to the plantation as part of the raid on Paineville Crossroads to locate and destroy a Confederate wagon train. According to family lore, Mrs. Mason informed the troopers she was quartering no Confederate soldiers or supplies. Before leaving, two cavalrymen backed a horse up to the smokehouse and "induced the horse to kick in the door". Taking several hams with them, the cavalry left. Sometime after the war one of the cavalrymen returned to Haw Branch to pay his respects to Mrs. Mason.

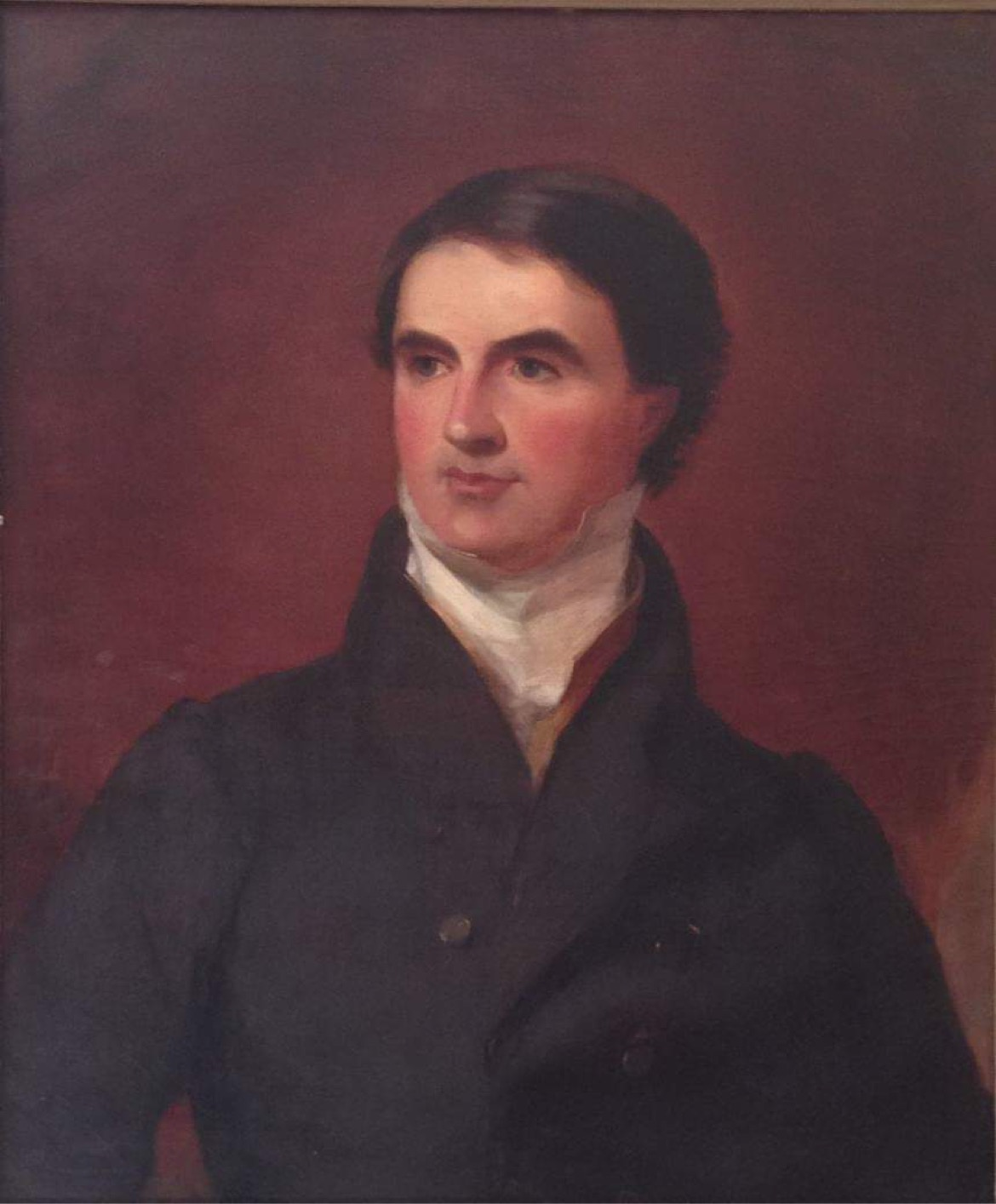
Portrait of William Jones Barksdale ca. 1815-1820. Barksdale married Marianna Elizabeth Tabb, who inherited the 1,780 acre Haw Branch plantation from her father, John Tabb. Photo of the portrait by Gibson Jefferson McConnaughey.

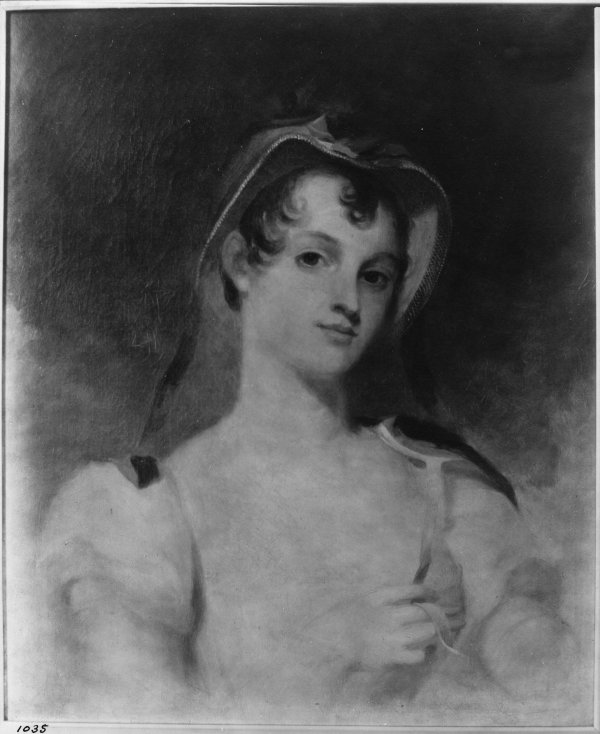
Portrait of Marianna Elizabeth Tabb Barksdale (1796-1856), wife of William Jones Barksdale. Ca. 1815

After the Civil War, Harriet Mason's finances were heavily invested in the Gallego Flour Mill, then partly owned by the Barksdale family and managed by her brother, Robert Jones Barksdale. Robert Barksdale took his father's managerial seat in the company that owned the mills, Warwick & Barksdale. The mill was destroyed by the Great Fire of April 1865 when Richmond was evacuated by the Army of Northern Virginia. At the time the Gallego Mill was one of the largest flour mills in the world and could produce over 2,000 barrels of flour and meal per day. Post-war efforts to rebuild the Gallego interests included restructuration and the creation of a joint-stock company. Despite attempts to diversify with the addition of a cotton factory, and a vigorous export flour market, the company's value fluttered and Robert J. Barksdale was forced to sell his sister's stock to help keep the company afloat. By 1872, Harriet Barksdale Mason sold Haw Branch, perhaps partially due to the crippling loss of her shares in the Gallego Mill.

== Haw Branch as Abercorn Colony ==
An Englishman named Murray MacGregor Blacker purchased Haw Branch from Harriet Barksdale and converted the farm into an educational farm for young landed English gentry new to managing estates. By dispensation from the Duke of Abercorn, Blacker renamed Haw Branch the "Abercorn Colony". His goals were to bring in German immigrant farming families from the Upper Midwest and create a farming community based on progressive agricultural practices. Their subscription of $150 to the colony included a dwelling house and deed to a plot of land at Abercorn. Contemporary accounts indicate that investors in the Abercorn Colony had bought up 10,000 acres of land adjoining the initial Haw Branch tract to enlarge the enterprise. Long term goals were to organize the colony into an incorporated village with town lots laid out. In 1880 a U.S. Post Office at Abercorn was established with Ferdinand Mitterer as the Postmaster. The post office served a radius of roughly three miles between Truxillo and Lodore, the first postmaster was Ferdinand Mitterer, and operated until 1903. The structure included package and parcel slots on the side of the building, an interior office area with a stove, and two stalls for delivery horses. Clad in board and batten siding, the roof was covered in Buckingham slate which drained to cast iron guttering patented by Murray Blacker. The structure remained standing as of 2025.

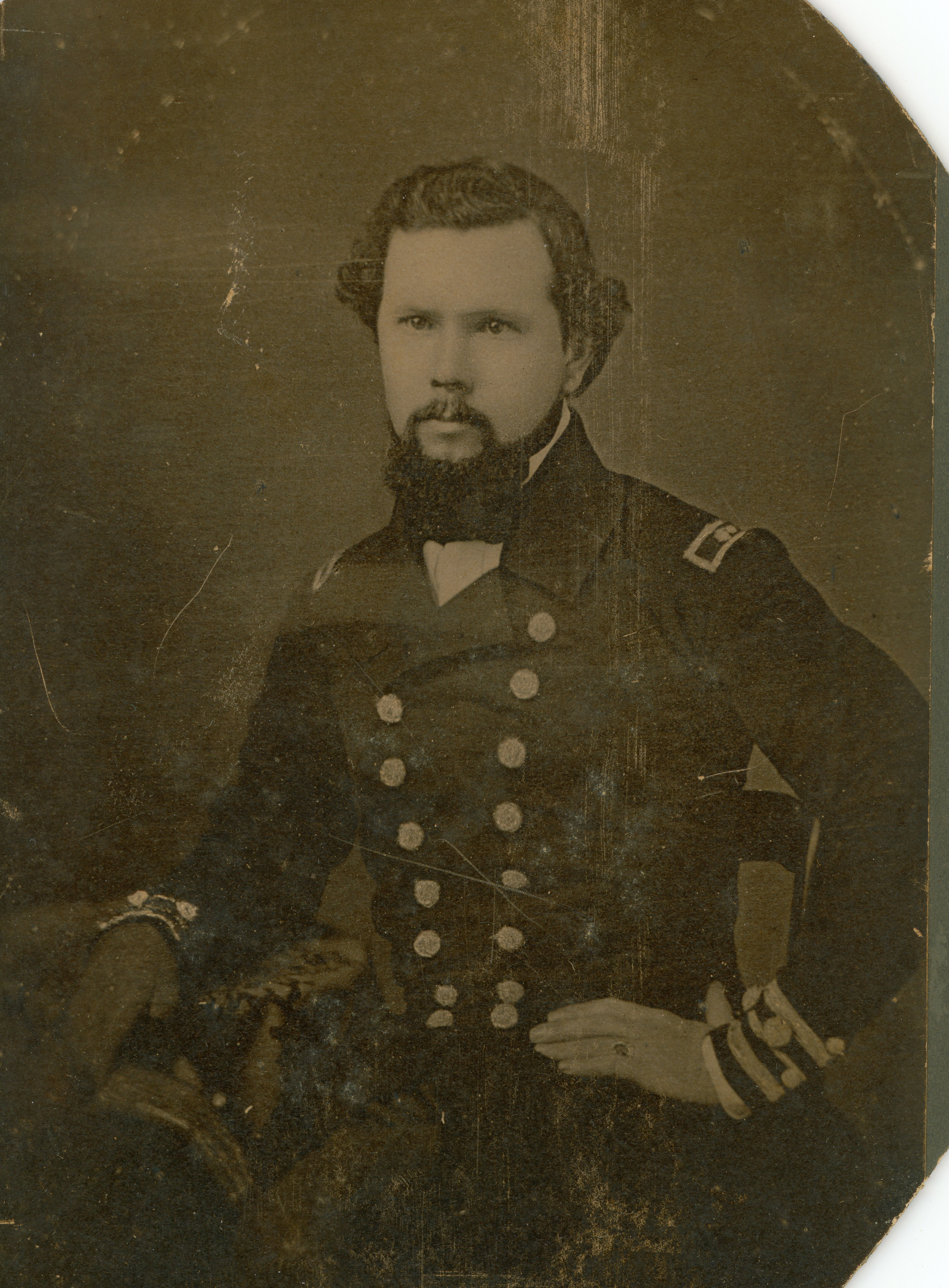
Portrait of John Y. Mason Jr., Purser, USN (1823-1862). Taken 1852 when he wed Harriet Bathurst Barksdale.

Blacker's agricultural improvements were likely the singular most change to Haw Branch since it was cleared to be a plantation. Water rams in adjoining Flat Creek and Haw Branch provided irrigation to fields and the primary crops were corn, wheat, barley and oats. Blacker scorned tobacco as a debilitating crop to the land. A sawmill and grist mill provided lumber and flour for local use and export. He also planted an apple orchard (three trees remain in 2024) from which to make apple brandy for sale. He was keenly interested in improving breed standards for livestock and kept fine cattle and sheep. Large flocks and herds provided manure for fertilization of the fields and after the threshing barn burned circa 1880, a large modern barn was constructed that contains four levels, including three subterranean silage pits. Blacker invested in horse bloodlines and imported notable Arabian stock. His passion for riding and jumping led him to help form the Deep Run Hunt with Lewis Ginter. Blacker was known for his daily rides to check the estate and would yell "Ovah!" when crossing a fence or hedge. At age 72 he broke his hip from a jumping accident but regained his ability to ride. His saddle post remains on the back porch of Haw Branch.

Blacker sold Abercorn in the early 20th century and the farm passed through a number of hands, including Frederick "Fritz" Sitterding Jr., famous real estate broker from Richmond and owner of the Home Brewing Company that manufactured Richbrau beer from 1934-1969. The house was used as a game lodge and the farm dwindled in size as parcels were sold for timbering. In 1965 descendants of the Tabb/Barksdale/Mason family purchased Haw Branch and began an intensive restoration of the house and grounds. By that time, the house had fallen into disrepair and some rooms were being used for grain storage and to cure tobacco. This one-year renaissance was led by Gibson Jefferson McConnaughey (direct descendant of Thomas Tabb) and her husband W. Cary McConnaughey. Her efforts included not only architectural renovation but restoration of many of the home's original furnishings and art due to her efforts to regroup them from various family members inheritance. By the late 1960s Haw Branch was open to the public as a house museum, a popular theme for many historic estates in Virginia in the lead-up to the Bicentennial Commemoration.

Southeast elevation of Haw Branch taken in 1958 by Gibson Jefferson McConnaughey.

== Architecture at Haw Branch ==
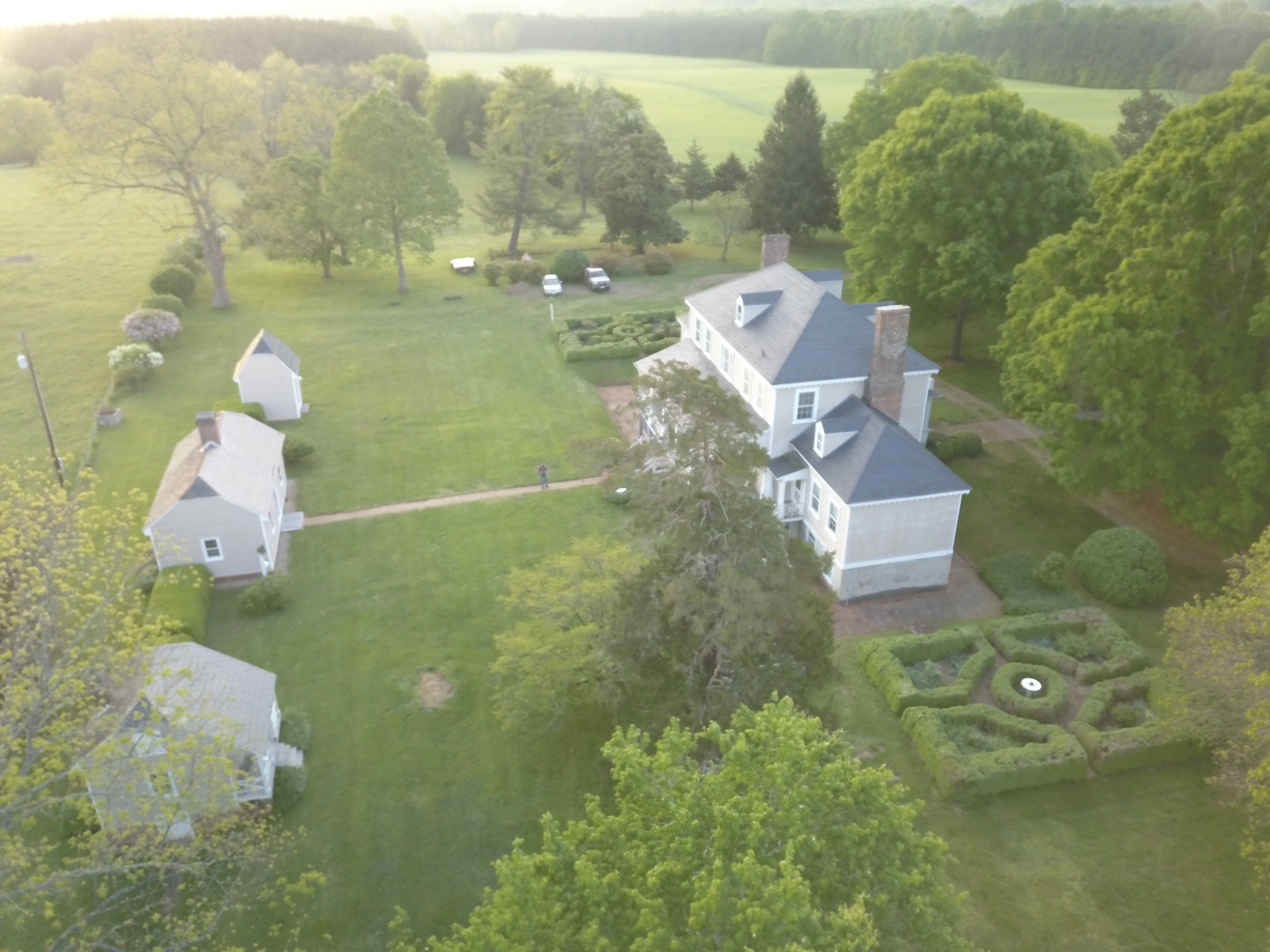

View of Haw Branch in 1958. Photo by Gibson Jefferson McConnaughey.

In 1745 Thomas Tabb was taxed on a 'mansion house' at Haw Branch, indicating a completed dwelling by that year. What of that house is contained within the current structure is unknown. Various dates for its modern appearance have been put forth and have focused on the fourth quarter of the 18th century, specifically the 1780s. However, in his advertisement to sell Haw Branch in 1829, William Jones Barksdale references the main dwelling house as "built within the last nine years", indicating a construction date of 1818. That is additionally substantiated by a date brick in the west chimney with the same date inscribed in it. It is likely that Barksdale, in setting up housekeeping with his wife Marianna Tabb, built her a 'new' house. Whether or not he incorporated elements of an earlier structure remains to be proven. It is known that the 1818 structure incorporated a lead roof which was donated to the Confederacy by Barksdale's daughter Harriet Bathurst Barksdale Mason during the Civil War.

The house consists of a five-bay central block with hipped roof and exterior end chimneys, flanked by symmetrical three-bay wings with hipped roofs. A dry, brick-lined moat provides full fenestration to the lower level, which appears as an English basement from afar. The attic is fully paneled with beaded, hand-planed pine and includes two rooms. Wainscot paneling throughout the first and second floors is of a single 24" pine board. Prior to the 1965 restoration most interior painted wood surfaces were grained as though cut from quarter-sawn oak. The drawing room and dining room once contained vertical oval windows in the style of the fan lights above both front and back doors and could be rolled into pockets to allow air circulation. Decorative carving in the drawing and dining rooms include a flower motif intended to reflect the connection to the home's namesake, hawthorn trees lining nearby creeks. Adamesque swags adorn paneling above the drawing room door and medallions at the corners of the window casements include the hawthorn flower motif. The central hallway includes an arch stepped onto mirrored columns. Tobacco leaves, oak leaves, and a rope design are carved into the frieze and architrave of the columns to indicate the businesses of the Barksdale family. Fenestration is thorough, including full size six-over-six double-hung casement windows in first floor closets. Two dormer windows are on the south façade and a single, central dormer pierces the north roof of the main block. A back porch/veranda was added by Murray Blacker in the late 19th century and spans the entire width of the central block.

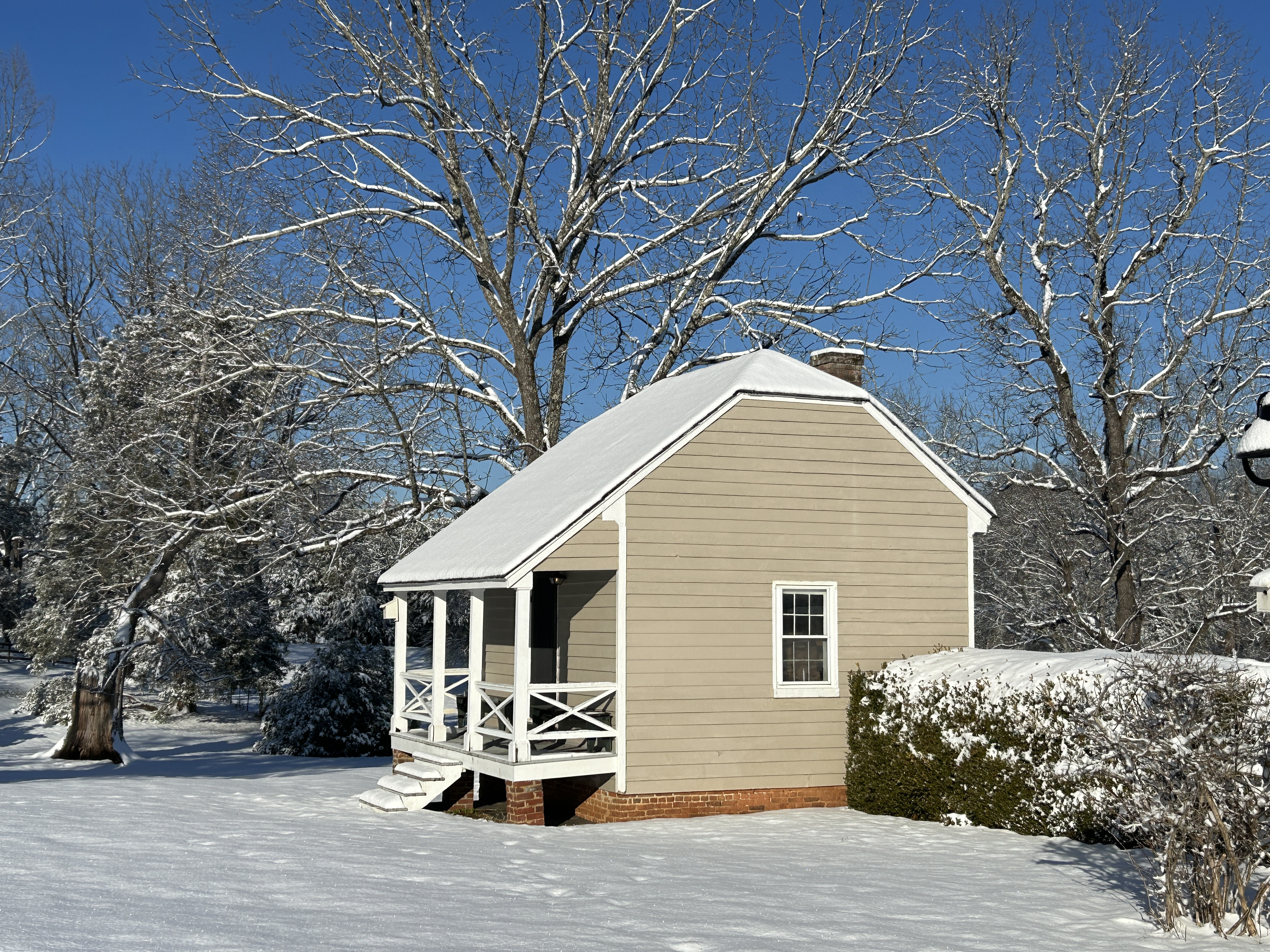
East elevation of the garçonnière at Haw Branch, modified during the late 19th century to serve as a school for the Abercorn Colony

Behind the main dwelling house is a row of three surviving dependencies. Westernmost is a small structure approximately sixteen feet square that includes a basement with a fireplace. This building is listed as a dwelling by Mason family descendants who were raised at Haw Branch. It was likely constructed as a garçonnière for visiting bachelors but local lore indicate that it was repurposed as a schoolhouse for the Abercorn Colony. Modifications to the structure indicate mid-19th century adaptations including the addition of a small interior room with a long peg board which may have served as a cloak room for pupils.

The middle dependency contains a massive central brick chimney stack with opposing cooking hearths and a brick oven. The western room was used as the plantation kitchen and the eastern room was a weaving room. Murray Blacker converted a lower level room in the main house into a modern kitchen during his occupancy and turned the kitchen building into a tack room. East of the kitchen is a smoke house which originally sat behind the kitchen building and was moved during the 1965 restoration. Like the other two dependencies, it has a jerkinhead roof and is Virginia-style timber framed where the corner vertical timbers are vee-shaped in profile but hewn from a single log and braced diagonally to the sill with morticed downbraces. The smokehouse sits on the spot where a brick ice house once stood. The depression from its two-story ice pit may still be seen.

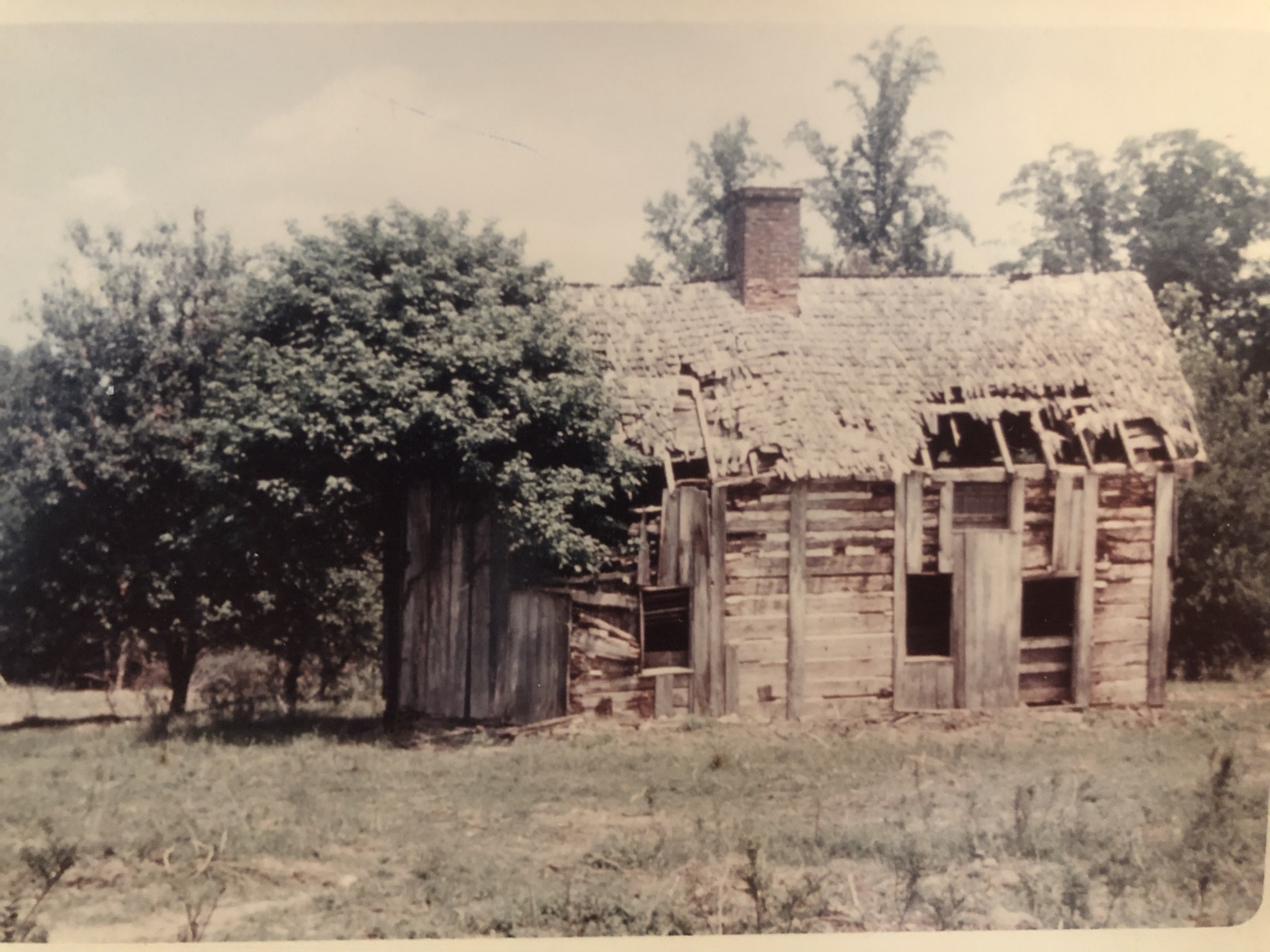
Slave dwelling at Haw Branch. This was one of six cabins located near the main house and was replaced in 1974 with a modernized tenant house. Photo by Gibson Jefferson McConnaughey in 1965.

Approximately five hundred feet northwest of the main dwelling house are the remains of a slave dwelling constructed in 1859. The original structure was constructed from squared logs covered in board and batten siding. A central chimney included four hearths to provide heat, cooking, and light to the four interior rooms. In 1974, what remained of the original structure was removed and a replica building constructed using logs from two deconstructed tobacco barns. The replacement building was longer to accommodate a bathroom, laundry, and two staircases.

To the west of the house are the aforementioned Murray Blacker barn and post office. To the north of the house a small shed remains that is attributed as a lambing shed for Abercorn. Its original slate roof is consistent with Blacker construction materials at Abercorn but the fastenings indicate a construction date of the 1890s or after. Piercings in the side for dog runs indicate its use a kennel, likely during when Haw Branch was used as a hunting lodge.

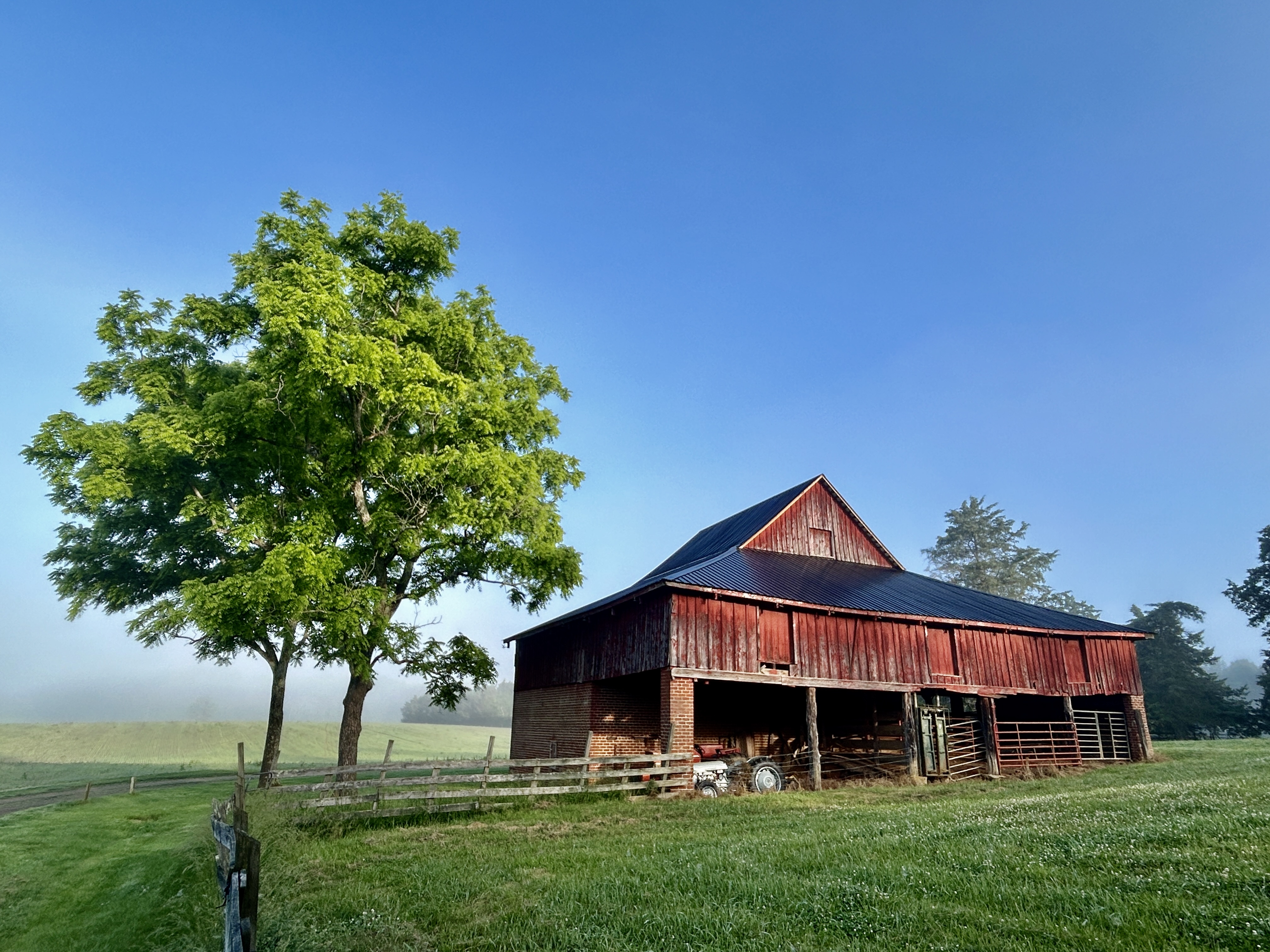
Constructed ca. 1880 by Murray Blacker, this barn replaced an earlier ca. 1820 threshing barn destroyed by fire. It contains two hay mows, a ground level, and three subterranean brick-lined silage pits.

Many other outbuildings served Haw Branch that are now gone including a carriage house, stables, cow barn, dairy, smithy, tobacco barns, a coal-heated orangery to the east of the house, and a counting house to the west of the main house.

== Haw Branch Canal ==
Throughout the 1700s Virginians sought to improve interior waterways for navigation. As Tidewater plantations played out and planters of increasing wealth and ability moved into the Piedmont region, navigability of rivers and creeks became a priority. By the end of the century proponents of interior navigations took note from successes in England, Wales, France, and elsewhere, to connect Virginia's saltwater ports with expanding agricultural and industrial enterprise. Petersburg, located at the head of the tidal Appomattox River, played an important role in the development of Virginia's Piedmont and the Tabb family capitalized on that fact during the second half of the 18th century. John Tabb's extensive holdings in Petersburg were not only speculative but allowed his warehouses to unload and move goods to regional stores operated by Rumbold, Walker & Tabb. Direct shipments to Petersburg from London and Liverpool supplied a rapidly expanding market across the southern Piedmont. By the early 19th century the Appomattox River was improved by wing dams, diversion canals around mill dams, rock sluices, and constant maintenance. Batteaux up to 90' long could operate far up the river. Larger tributary creeks, such as Flat Creek, were also cleared and maintained to allow boat traffic further into Amelia and Nottoway counties. Haw Branch, a tributary of Flat Creek, flowed through the Tabb holdings of Clay Hill and Haw Branch plantations and was selected to become the family's private port.

Earthen dikes constructed along Flat Creek and Haw Branch helped contain the waterways during high water and Haw Branch creek was straightened and channelized (canalized) to allow batteaux to reach a place where the main plantation road connecting the manor houses at Clay Hill and Haw Branch passed over the creek. Today, the straightened creek banks remain in many places, as does the remains of earth and stone abutments from the old plantation road. Thus improved, Haw Branch allowed the adjacent Tabb/Barksdale/Mason plantations maritime connection to the Atlantic World which gave rise to the old family saying that "From Haw Branch you can go anywhere in the world by boat."

The Haw Branch Canal was used until the 1880s when Murray Blacker bought a consignment of sugar and had it shipped by boat to Abercorn (nee Haw Branch). According to local lore, a national crisis in the sugar supply had caused a spike in its price and Blacker bought the load to resell to the local populace for deflated prices.

== Haw Branch in the modern era ==
After the 1965 restoration of the house, dependencies, and grounds, Haw Branch was a historic house/plantation museum open to the public daily. It was featured in Life magazine and was frequently on Spring Garden Tours of historic Virginia homes. The McConnaughey family operated Mid-South Publishing Company out of Haw Branch and published several titles including Two Centuries of Virginia Cooking (ISBN 0931012015), a compilation of family recipes. In 1973 Haw Branch was added to the Virginia Landmarks Registry and the National Register of Historic Places

Today, Haw Branch remains a working farm and a private residence.
