= Wigwam (Lodore, Virginia) =

Historic house in Virginia, United States

- U.S. National Register of Historic Places
- Virginia Landmarks Register
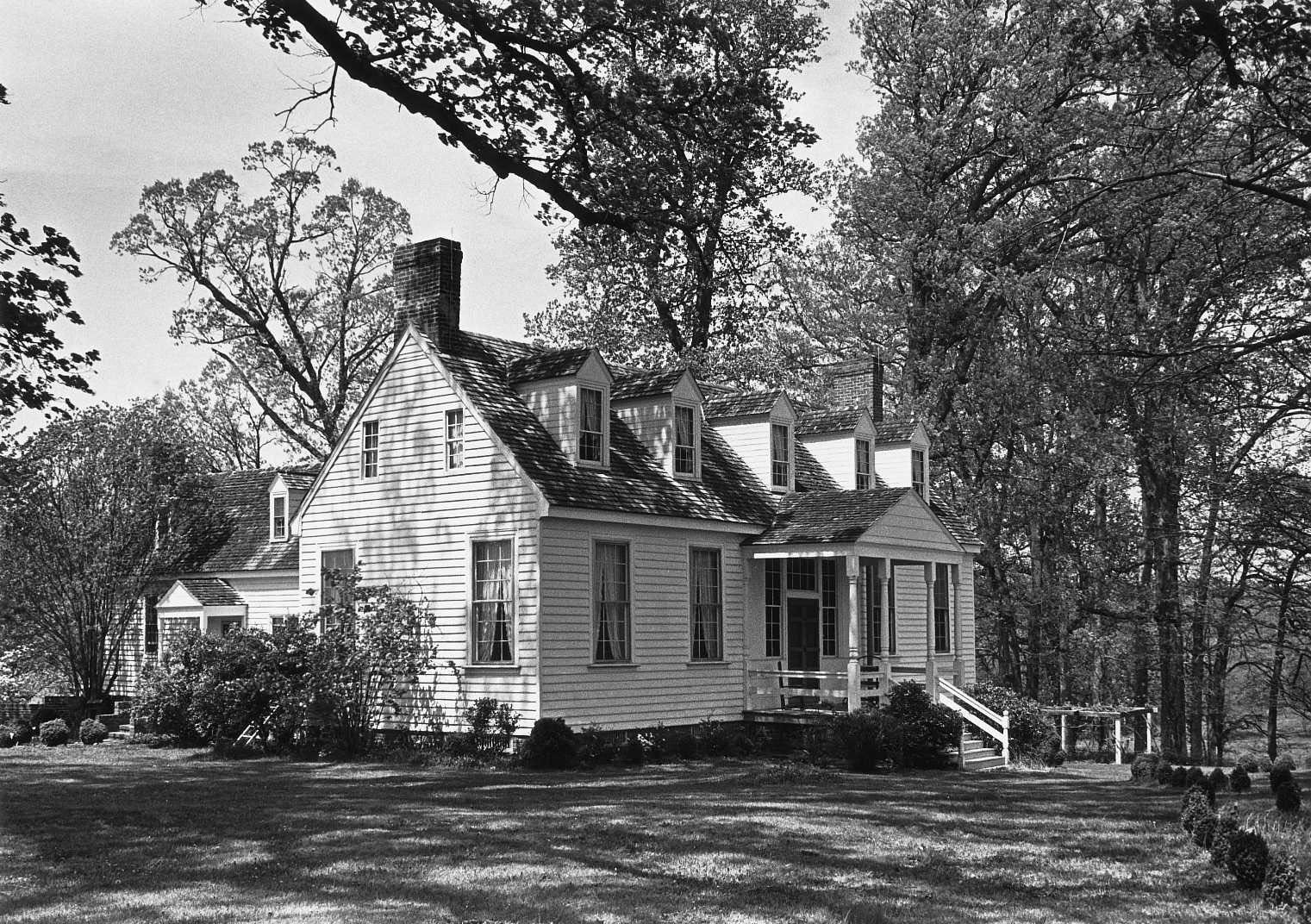
- The Wigwam – home of Virginia Governor William Branch Giles and the Harrison family

- Location within Virginia Location within the United States
- Location: 4 miles (6.4 km) northeast of Lodore, Virginia
- Coordinates: 37°28′18″N 77°59′53″W
- Area: 0 acres (0 ha)
- NRHP reference No.: 69000220
- VLR No.: 004-0003

Significant dates
- Added to NRHP: November 25, 1969
- Designated VLR: May 13, 1969

The Wigwam is a landmark home, of Cape Cod style, built in 1790, close to the Appomattox River near Lodore on Rt. 637 (Giles Road), in Amelia County, Virginia. Governor William Branch Giles (1762-1830) built the house and made it his home until his death, and it later became a home of the Harrison family.

== History ==
The original 18th-century building included only the back section, with the more formal front being added in 1818. There is some information that the front section was originally relocated from the John Royall estate, called Caxamelalea. However, experts from Williamsburg have refuted this based upon their inspection of the house. It has 18 rooms and at one time had 5 full baths. There are 4 chimneys, which serve 13 fireplaces, and 65 windows, 17 of which are dormers. One room in the basement appears to have been used to hold Yankee prisoners in the American Civil War; the room has a barred window and evidence of shackles on the wall.

In 1832, Giles' son conveyed the property to William Henry Harrison, cousin of the president by that name. Harrison, with his wife Lucy (née Powers), raised six children there, and established a school for boys in the home, named Amelia Academy. The Christian school was run principally to prepare its students for entrance to the University of Virginia in Charlottesville. The school's 1859–1860 flyer indicated a census of 25 pupils, and the school's board members included John Hartwell Cocke.

In his final years running the school, William Henry was assisted by his eldest son, J. Hartwell Harrison. Two days before Christmas in 1881, William Henry, inconsolable and confused after the death of wife Lucy in Richmond that October, set out on horseback in the snow, supposing to visit her for Christmas. Hours later, his horse returned to the Wigwam without him, and he was discovered at a nearby intersection, having suffered a fatal heart attack. His burial in Richmond next to Lucy was arranged by Christmas, and the Wigwam passed to his son Hartwell. Hartwell eventually phased out the school there and made the Wigwam his home with wife Anna (née Carrington) and their six children. He farmed the property and became the area's local Baptist minister.

The devastating effects of the Panic of 1893 resulted in Hartwell’s mortgage default in 1896, and the family's eviction from the home by the mortgage holder, his brother-in-law Lewis Harvie Blair. The family, including 4 children aged 7 to 17, had just finished putting in that year’s crops. In the mid-1900s, the property was owned and renovated by Hartwell's son, Robert C. Harrison.

The Wigwam was added to the National Register of Historic Places in 1969. In the late-1990s, the home and farm underwent major renovations by new ownership.
