= William Branch Giles =

American politician (1762–1830)

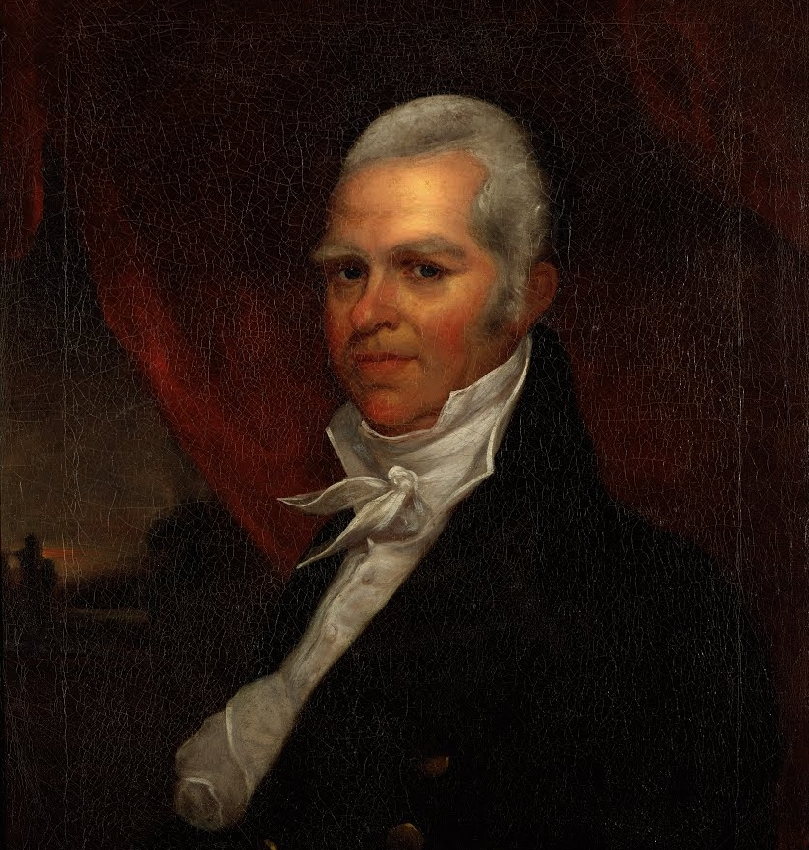

24th Governor of Virginia
- In office March 4, 1827 – March 4, 1830
- Preceded by: John Tyler
- Succeeded by: John Floyd
- In office December 4, 1804 – March 3, 1815
- Preceded by: Andrew Moore
- Succeeded by: Armistead T. Mason
- In office August 11, 1804 – December 4, 1804
- Appointed by: John Page
- Preceded by: Abraham B. Venable
- Succeeded by: Andrew Moore

Member of the U.S. House of Representatives from Virginia's 9th district
- In office March 4, 1801 – March 3, 1803
- Preceded by: Joseph Eggleston
- Succeeded by: Philip R. Thompson
- In office December 7, 1790 – October 2, 1798
- Preceded by: Theodorick Bland
- Succeeded by: Joseph Eggleston

Member of the Virginia House of Delegates from Amelia County
- In office 1826–1827 Serving with John White Nash
- Preceded by: Rodophil Jeter
- Succeeded by: Richard Booker
- In office 1816–1817 Serving with John Lane
- Preceded by: John L. Townes
- Succeeded by: John Booker
- In office 1798–1800 Serving with Joshua Chaffin
- Preceded by: Joseph Eggleston
- Succeeded by: Edmund Harrison

Personal details
- Born: August 12, 1762 Amelia Courthouse, Colony of Virginia, British America
- Died: December 4, 1830 (aged 68) Amelia Courthouse, Virginia, United States
- Party: Democratic-Republican
- Spouses: Martha Peyton Tabb (m. 1797; died 1808); Frances Ann Gwynn (m. 1810)
- Children: 6
- Education: College of William & Mary; Hampden–Sydney College

William Branch Giles (Note: The g is pronounced like a j) (August 12, 1762 – December 4, 1830) was an American politician and long-term senator from Virginia who served as the 24th governor of Virginia. He served in the House of Representatives from 1790 to 1798 and again from 1801 to 1803; in between, he was a member of the Virginia House of Delegates and was an Elector for Jefferson (and Aaron Burr) in 1800. He served as a United States Senator from 1804 to 1815 and then served briefly in the House of Delegates again. After a time in private life, he joined the opposition to John Quincy Adams and Henry Clay in 1824; he ran for the Senate again in 1825 and was defeated but appointed Governor for three one-year terms in 1827; he was succeeded by John Floyd, in the year of his death.

== Early life and education ==
He was born and died in Amelia County, where he built his home, The Wigwam. Giles attended Prince Edward Academy, now Hampden–Sydney College, and the College of New Jersey, now Princeton University; he probably followed Samuel Stanhope Smith, who was teaching at Prince Edward Academy when he was appointed President of the College in 1779. He then went on to study law with Chancellor George Wythe and at the College of William and Mary

== Career ==
Admitted to the Virginia bar in 1786, Giles supported the new Constitution during the ratification debates of 1788 but was not a member of the ratifying convention.

Giles was elected to the U.S. House of Representatives in a special election in 1790, taking the seat of Theodorick Bland, who had died in office on June 1; he is believed to be the first member of the United States Congress to be elected in a special election. He was to be re-elected three times; he resigned on October 2, 1798, on the grounds of ill health and in disgust at the Alien and Sedition Acts.

During this first period in Congress, he fervently supported his fellow Virginians James Madison and Thomas Jefferson against Alexander Hamilton and his ideas for a national bank preferring Jefferson's idea of an agrarian republic. Working with Jefferson, whose daughter he was courting, and Madison, he introduced three sets of resolutions in 1793, which attempted to censure Hamilton's "administration of finances" as Secretary of the Treasury to the point of accusing him of maladministration in office under the Funding Act of 1790 to force the US to repay America's debts to France following the French Revolution. Per this goal, he opposed the pro-British Jay's Treaty and resisted naval appropriation to be used against France during the Quasi-War. In the same year, he voted for the Kentucky and Virginia Resolutions in the House of Delegates to declare the Alien and Sedition Acts unconstitutional.

After another term in the House, from 1801 to 1803, Giles was appointed as a Senator from Virginia after the resignation of Wilson Cary Nicholas in 1804. Giles served in the US Senate and was reappointed in 1810 until he resigned on March 3, 1815. Giles strongly advocated the removal of Justice Samuel Chase after his impeachment, urging the Senate to consider it as a political decision (as to whether the people of the United States should have confidence in Chase) rather than as a trial.

Giles was deeply disappointed by the acquittal of Chase. He supported the election of Madison as president in 1808, in preference to the Federalist candidate Charles Cotesworth Pinckney. Giles was Madison's chief advocate in Virginia.

After the election, however, he joined with Senator Samuel Smith of Maryland and his brother Robert Smith, the Secretary of State, in criticizing Madison; first as too weak on Britain and then, in 1812, as too precipitate in going to war; however, voted for the declaration of war. He disliked Albert Gallatin, the Secretary of the Treasury, who was primarily responsible for preventing his nomination as Secretary of State and defeating Gallatin's bill of 1811 for a new Bank of the United States.

Giles's refusal to accept the General Assembly's instructions led to his rejection at the next poll for a senator. (The state legislatures elected senators in those days.) Giles served one relatively uneventful term in the Virginia House of Delegates in 1816–1817 and then retired from political office for a time. He, however, published opinion pieces and columns, chiefly in the Richmond, Virginia, Enquirer, in which he deplored the Era of Good Feelings as false prosperity, given over to banks, tariffs, and fraudulent internal improvements; these would centralize and corrupt government, and ruin the farmers. He attacked John Quincy Adams and Henry Clay as he had attacked Hamilton, calling them corrupt Anglophiles.

Giles also published a criticism of the Jeffersonian program for public education. Giles argued that it was unjust to tax one man to educate another man's children, and the teachers that the government employed would constitute a special interest, always ready to vote for higher taxes and government spending. Besides, he said, giving every boy in Virginia three years of school would have limited practical utility, deprive farm families of much-needed labor power, and leave the typical "scholar" unfitted for the return to hard labor that awaited him.

When James Barbour left the Senate in 1825, Giles attempted to persuade the legislature to appoint him as a replacement; they appointed John Randolph instead. In 1826, Giles was again elected to the House of Delegates, and in 1827 he was elected Governor; Giles served as Governor of Virginia for three terms, from March 4, 1827, to March 4, 1830. From the governorship, Giles encouraged Virginia's Senator Littleton Waller Tazewell to organize a southern resistance to the American System of Henry Clay centered on a boycott on northern manufactures. Tazewell found little support for it among southern senators.

In Giles's last term, he was a member of the Virginia Constitutional Convention of 1829–1830 where he strongly supported the existing apportionment of the House of Delegates, giving the eastern counties of Virginia, with a minority of the voters, control of the legislature. He did favor reform of the suffrage requirements, however. Giles also opposed the movement in the convention to strengthen his own office, the governorship. Strong governorships in other states, such as New York, were at the center of political machines kept together by patronage and corruption, he said, and the reason that Virginia had not suffered from those ills was that the governorship in his state was too weak to be worth fighting for. Rather than follow the example of New York, with its party machine, it was better for Virginia to retain George Mason's executive model. Giles lost to some extent: while the governor's term remained short and was still accountable to the General Assembly, the Constitution of 1830 abolished the privy council, thus making the governorship a bit more independent.

== Personal life ==
Giles married twice; first in 1797, to Martha Peyton Tabb, the widow of patriot John Tabb. Giles built his 18-room house, "The Wigwam," for her. They had three children. After she died in 1808, he married Frances Ann Gwynn in 1810 and had three more children.

== Legacy ==
Giles's historical reputation has been mixed. Frederick Scott Oliver called him a "preposterous, pugilistic character" marked by a "reckless disregard of truth" and by "the grossness of his nature." Joseph Story, though taking similar umbrage at Giles's alleged rhetorical excesses and noting the poor impression made by his dowdy appearance, wrote that, "when he speaks, your opinion immediately changes":

[A] clear, nervous expression, a well-digested and powerful condensation of language, give to the continual flow of his thoughts an uninterrupted impression. He holds his subject always before him, and surveys it with untiring eyes; he points his objections with calculated force, and sustains his positions with penetrating and wary argument. He certainly possesses great natural strength of mind; and if he reasons on false principles or with sophistic evasions, he always brings to his subject a weight of thought, which can be shaken or disturbed only by the attack of superior wisdom.

Claude Bowers called Oliver's appraisal a "wretchedly unfair caricature" and advanced a favorable view, noting, among other things, praise that Giles received from Patrick Henry, John Randolph of Roanoke, and other contemporaries.

Counties in two states were named in his honor: Giles County, Virginia and Giles County, Tennessee. His name also graces a residence hall at the College of William and Mary.

The Wigwam was added to the National Register of Historic Places in 1969.

== Notes ==
U.S. House of Representatives
Preceded by Theodorick Bland	Member of the U.S. House of Representatives from Virginia's 9th congressional district December 7, 1790 – October 2, 1798	Succeeded by Joseph Eggleston
Preceded by Joseph Eggleston	Member of the U.S. House of Representatives from Virginia's 9th congressional district March 4, 1801 – March 4, 1803	Succeeded by Philip R. Thompson
U.S. Senate
Preceded by Abraham B. Venable	U.S. senator (Class 1) from Virginia; August 11, 1804 – December 3, 1804; Served alongside: Andrew Moore	Succeeded by Andrew Moore
Preceded by Andrew Moore	U.S. senator (Class 2) from Virginia; December 4, 1804 – March 4, 1815; Served alongside: Andrew Moore, Richard Brent, James Barbour	Succeeded by Armistead T. Mason
Political offices
Preceded by John Tyler	Governor of Virginia; March 4, 1827 – March 4, 1830	Succeeded by John Floyd
