= Virginia State Route 307 =

State highway in Virginia, United States

State Route 307
- Holly Farms Road

Route information
- Maintained by VDOT
- Length: 9.32 mi (15.00 km)
- Existed: 1936–present

Major junctions
- West end: US 460 at Rice
- East end: US 360 near Jetersville

Location
- Country: United States
- State: Virginia
- Counties: Prince Edward, Nottoway, Amelia

Highway system
- Virginia Routes; Interstate; US; Primary; Secondary; Byways; History; HOT lanes
← SR 306	→ SR 308

State Route 307 (SR 307) is a primary state highway in the U.S. state of Virginia. Known as Holly Farms Road, the state highway runs 9.32 miles (15.00 km) from U.S. Route 460 (US 460) at Rice east to US 360 near Jetersville. SR 307 provides a cut-off that allows traffic between Lynchburg and Richmond to bypass Burkeville.

== Route description ==
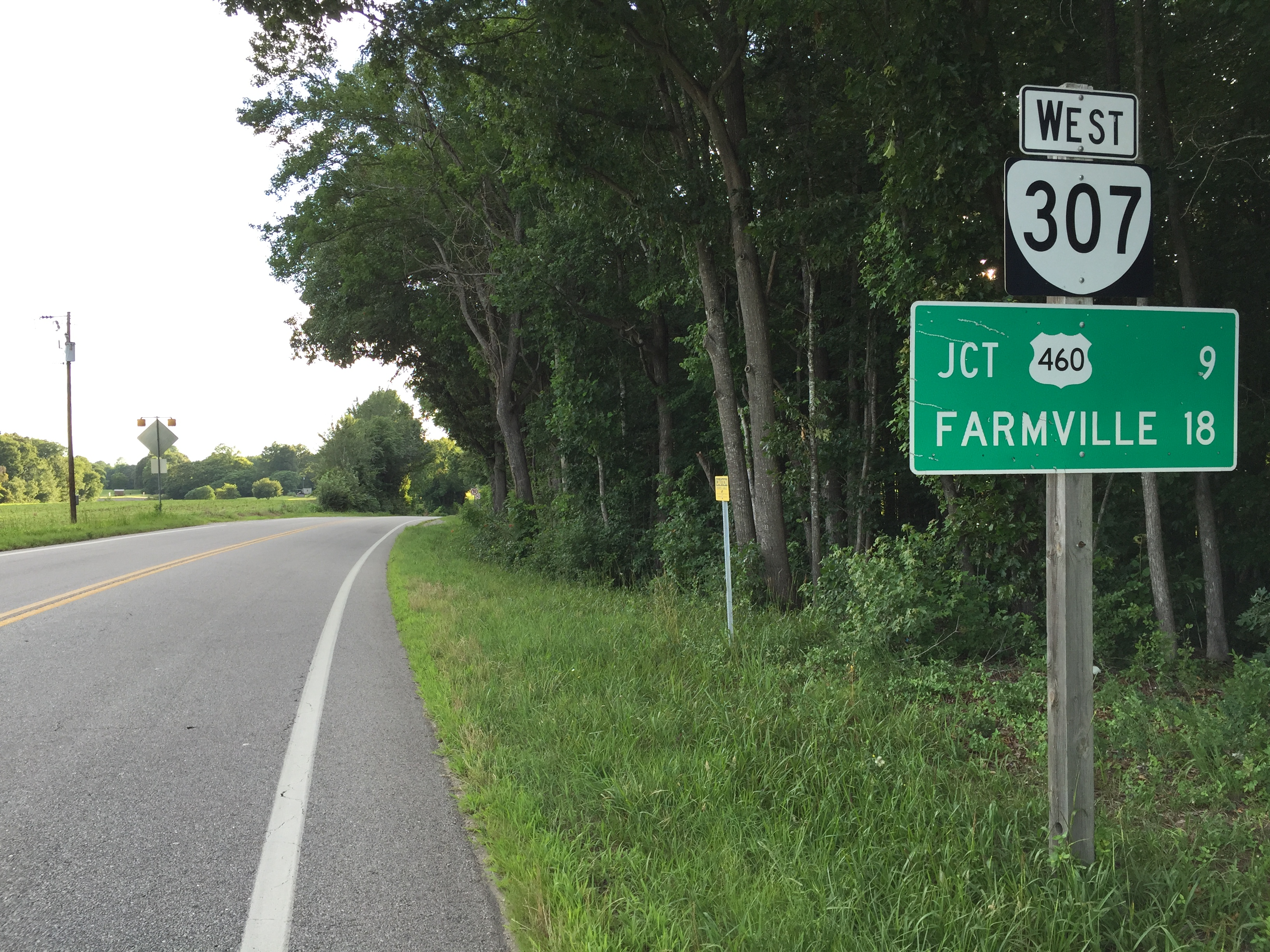
View west at the east end of SR 307 at US 360 near Jetersville

SR 307 begins at a tangent intersection with US 460 (Prince Edward Highway) at the hamlet of Rice in eastern Prince Edward County between Farmville and Burkeville. The state highway heads east and intersects SR 617, which heads north to Sailor's Creek Battlefield Historical State Park, which preserves the site of the Civil War Battle of Sailor's Creek. East of SR 617, SR 307 crosses the northwestern edge of Nottoway County. The state highway enters Amelia County shortly before reaching its eastern terminus near Jetersville between Burkeville and Amelia Court House.

== Major intersections ==
County	Location	mi	km	Destinations	Notes
Prince Edward	Rice	0.00	0.00	US 460 (Prince Edward Highway) – Lynchburg, Burkeville	Western terminus
Nottoway	No major junctions				
Amelia		9.32	15.00	US 360 (Patrick Henry Highway) – Amelia, Richmond, Burkeville	Eastern terminus
1.000 mi = 1.609 km; 1.000 km = 0.621 mi
