= John Keough =

American Civil War Medal of Honor recipient

- Born: c. 1835; County Tipperary, Ireland
- Died: Unknown
- Military career
- Allegiance: United States
- Branch: United States Army
- Rank: Corporal
- Units: Company E, 67th Pennsylvania Infantry
- Conflicts: Battle of Sayler's Creek; American Civil War
- Awards: Medal of Honor

John Keough (born c. 1835; date of death unknown) was a Union Army officer in the American Civil War who received the U.S. military's highest decoration, the Medal of Honor.

Keough was born in County Tipperary, Ireland in about 1835 and it is believed he entered service in Annapolis, Maryland or Albany, New York. He was awarded the Medal of Honor for extraordinary heroism shown on April 6, 1865, while serving as a corporal with Company E, 67th Pennsylvania Infantry, at the Battle of Sayler's Creek, in Virginia. Keough won his medal for capturing the battle flag of the Confederate States Army's 50th Georgia Infantry. His Medal of Honor was issued on May 10, 1865.

It is not known when Keough died, or where he was buried.

== Medal of Honor citation ==
The President of the United States of America, in the name of Congress, takes pleasure in presenting the Medal of Honor to Corporal John Keough, United States Army, for extraordinary heroism on 6 April 1865, while serving with Company E, 67th Pennsylvania Infantry, in action at Deatonsville (Sailor's Creek), Virginia, for capture of battle flag of 50th Georgia Infantry (Confederate States of America).
