= John Hughey (Medal of Honor) =

American Civil War Medal of Honor recipient (1936–1900)

John P. Hughey
- Born: 1836; Louisville, Kentucky, US
- Died: January 28, 1900 (aged 63); Hickman, Kentucky, US
- Military career
- Allegiance: United States
- Branch: United States Army
- Rank: Corporal
- Units: Company L, 2nd Ohio Cavalry
- Conflicts: Battle of Sayler's Creek; American Civil War
- Awards: Medal of Honor

John P. Hughey (1836 – January 28, 1900) was a Union Army soldier in the American Civil War who received the U.S. military's highest decoration, the Medal of Honor.

Hughey was born in Louisville, Kentucky in 1836 and entered service in Anna, Illinois. He was awarded the Medal of Honor, for extraordinary heroism shown on April 6, 1865, while serving as a corporal with Company E, 67th Pennsylvania Infantry, at the Battle of Sayler's Creek, in Virginia. Hughey won his medal for capturing the battle flag of the Confederate States Army's 38th Virginia Infantry. His Medal of Honor was issued on May 3, 1865. He died in Fulton County, Kentucky in 1900.

== Medal of Honor citation ==
The President of the United States of America, in the name of Congress, takes pleasure in presenting the Medal of Honor to Corporal John P. Hughey, United States Army, for extraordinary heroism on 6 April 1865, while serving with Company L, 2d Ohio Cavalry, in action at Deatonsville (Sailor's Creek), Virginia, for capture of flag of 38th Virginia Infantry (Confederate States of America).
