= Abdurakhman Avtorkhanov =

Chechen historian (1908–1997)

Abdurakhman Genazovich (Ganazovich) Avtorkhanov
- Абдурахман Геназович (Ганазович) Авторханов
- Born: 23 October 1908; Lakha Nevri, Chechnya, Russian Empire
- Died: 24 April 1997 (aged 88); Munich, Germany
- Occupations: Historian, Political scientist
- Writing career
- Subjects: Chechen society, Soviet history

Abdurakhman Genazovich Avtorkhanov (Russian: Абдурахман Геназович Авторханов; Chechen: Ӏабдурахьма́н Гена́зович Авторха́нов, 23 October 1908 – 24 April 1997) was a Chechen historian and Kremlinologist who authored books on the History of the Soviet Union and its ruling system.

Initially an elite-educated and devoted Communist Party functionary, Avtorkhanov was twice arrested by the Soviet secret police as a suspected nationalist organizer and "foreign spy". After twice winning his release, he returned to the Northern Caucasus in 1942 on assignment for the NKVD, only to cross lines to the Germans and be arrested by the Gestapo as a suspected Communist spy. Avtorkhanov managed to avoid execution for a third time by agreeing to work in Berlin as an editor for publications by the North Caucasus Committee.

After the war, he remained in West Germany, where he worked as a professor at the U.S. Army Russian Area School and helped to establish Radio Free Europe/Radio Liberty. Some of his anti-Communist writings were smuggled into the Soviet Union, where they circulated as samizdat.

== Biography ==
=== Early years ===
Abdurakhman Avtorkhanov was born October 23, 1908, in the small Chechen village of Lakha-Nevri, an enclave destroyed by Soviet troops during the deportation of the Chechen and Ingush population in 1944.

Avtorkhanov indicates that he "joined the Communist Youth in 1922, when I was fourteen." He joined the All-Union Communist Party in 1926.

From 1924 to 1926 he had been a student at a Chechen party school, before moving to the Grosny rabfak from 1927 to 1929. After completing the course of study at the rabfak, Avtorkhanov was then appointed as an assistant in the organization department of the oblast committee of the Chechen Communist Party, a post which he held for the rest of 1930 and in 1931.

In his books Avtorkhavov indicated that he interrupted his education in Grozny and spent one year of 1928 in Moscow where he attended the elite Institute of Red Professors (IKP), a top-tier training school of the Communist Party designed to develop Marxist professors in the social sciences,. According to his own account he became an advocate of the comparatively moderate agricultural policies of Nikolai Bukharin during his time at the IKP, a political position which would bring him into conflict with the party line during the collectivization campaign of 1929–30.

Avtorkhanov claimed to have been in the third row of the audience the speech at the IKP on May 28, 1928, by a visiting Joseph Stalin — a two hour address later published as "On the Grain Front." (Note: Avtorkhanov's memoir of this event, written three decades after the fact, appears as chapter one of his 1959 book, Stalin and the Soviet Communist Party, titled "A Special Lecture at the Institute of Red Professors.") This speech is regarded as a watershed of Soviet history, marking Stalin's intention to end the New Economic Policy in favor of an aggressive policy establishing collective farms and state farms, intended to increase grain production and the percentage of grain produced marketed to the state instead of sold through parallel privately-owned channels.

=== Pravda article ===
On June 22, 1930, Avtorkhanov saw an article of his published in Pravda, the official daily newspaper of the Communist Party. Avtorkhanov later represented this article, "For Fulfillment of the Party's Directives on the National Question," as a muted and somewhat veiled criticism of the policy being followed by the party with respect to national minorities in the USSR, stating "I maintained that the promises and declarations poured out up to that time by the Bolsheviks had remained a dead letter."

With the so-called "nationality question" being an intellectual focus of Communist Party General Secretary Joseph Stalin, and in the environment of inner-party conflict related to the collectivization issue, Avtorkhanov's deviation from orthodoxy was quickly noted and Pravda's big guns were trained on the young Chechen. A barrage was unleashed in print which, Avtorkhanov later recalled, "shot me to pieces." Avtorkhanov was called upon to recant his heretical exposition of views of the so-called "Bukharin right-wingers," which he did with a letter published in the July 4, 1930, edition of Pravda, dutifully renouncing his previous arguments.

According to Avtorkhanov, he wrote: "In my article...I stated that collectivization among the nationalities of the borderlands must begin with land distribution. I thereby permitted a gross Right opportunist error and now repudiate this theory.... I have no doubts or hesitations about the correctness of the general party line in the fields of industrialization, collectivization, or agriculture, and decisive struggle on two fronts — first and foremost, against the danger of Right deviation and second, in the field of national policy. With communist greetings, —A. Avtorkhanov."

=== Moscow period ===
Avtorkhanov states that in 1932 he was recalled to Moscow by the Central Committee for further academic training. He later recounted his enrollment in "a special course in Marxism laid down for the secretaries of regional and central committees of the 'national' communist parties." Avtorkhanov indicates he completed this program in 1933. The following year he indicates he was allowed to return to the Institute of Red Professors for further training as a historian, with this stint at the IKP concluding in 1937.

Avtorkhanov's enrollment at the IKP in 1934 is not a matter of dispute.

By the end of his stint taking an advanced course in history at the IKP, Avtorkhanov completed several works on the history of the Caucasus, including a book, Revolution and Counter-Revolution in Chechnia, serialized in Marxist Historian, the journal of the IKP, in 1934. He also contributed an article to the Great Soviet Encyclopedia, "Fundamental Problems of the History of the Chechen People," which appeared in volume 61.

=== Arrests by the NKVD ===
Avtorkhanov's career as a pospective Communist Party academic came to a cataclysmic halt with the eruption of a massive secret police terror in 1937. In the aftermath of the assassination of Leningrad top party leader Sergei Kirov by a Communist Party member in 1936, a campaign was launched to identify and eliminate was some believed to be a massive web of concealed "double-dealers," "wreckers," enemies, and foreign agents — with Communist Party members with checkered ideological pasts subjected to particular scrutiny. Nearly 700,000 people would be arrested, subjected to summary trials, and executed in the Terror that followed. (Note: This body count was a highly contested matter during the years of the Cold War, with estimates of executions and camp deaths running into the tens of millions. With the opening of formerly secret party archives these figures are no longer the subject of tendentious "the worse the better" guessing. According to archival research, total arrests by the NKVD during the 1937–38 Great Terror totaled 1,575,259 — with 681,692 of these executed and 653,028 sentenced to prison camps or exile, many of whom died. See: R.W. Davies, et al., The Industrialisation of Soviet Russia 7: The Soviet Economy and the Approach of War, 1937–1939. Basingstoke, UK: Palgrave Macmillan, 2018; p. 16. Citing I.A. Ziuzina, Istoriia Stalinskogo Gulaga 1920-kh – pervaia polovina 1950-kh gg. [History of the Stalinist Gulag from the 1920s to the first half of the 1950s] Moscow: 2004; p. 609.)

Avtorkhanov indicates that he was arrested by the NKVD in 1937, charged with having been "affiliated with the clandestine organization of national minorities in Moscow." During the investigative process, this charge was later expanded to charges of having worked as a spy for Great Britain, after having been named as such by "a leading functionary in the Soviet Embassy in London," he stated.

Avtorkhanov indicated that he was released by the NKVD on March 19, 1940, after which time he returned to Moscow. Another arrest followed in December and a new round of interrogation began, again charging that Avtorkhanov was involved in nationalist organizing activities. On April 21, 1942, he indicates he was released for a second time, "following representations made by the Court of Appeal to the Supreme Tribunal of the USSR."

According to Avtorkhanov's testimony four decades later, in releasing him the NKVD assigned him to infiltrate the anti-Soviet Chechen movement in which his school friend Khasan Israilov was a leader.

With World War II raging, Avtorkhanov departed Moscow for the Checheno-Ingush Autonomous Soviet Socialist Republic, ostensibly to carry out his mission for Soviet authorities.

=== Arrest by the Gestapo ===
Instead of conducting the task assigned him by the NKVD, Avtorkhanov crossed the front line to the Germans. He was promptly arrested by the German secret police, the Gestapo, under suspicion of being a Communist spy, he indicated. This potentially lethal situation was averted thanks to "the testimony of my friends and the good sense of a few Germans," and Avtorkhanov was shuttled off to Berlin where he worked for North Caucasus Committee headed by Akhmed-Nabi Magomaev as the editor of the committee's two main publications. This committee was the external political center associated with pro-Nazi North Caucasus legions, paramilitaries which ultimately came to count about 28,000 men under arms.

During the war, Avtorkhov also was published in many newspapers of Nazi Germany.

=== Post-War career ===
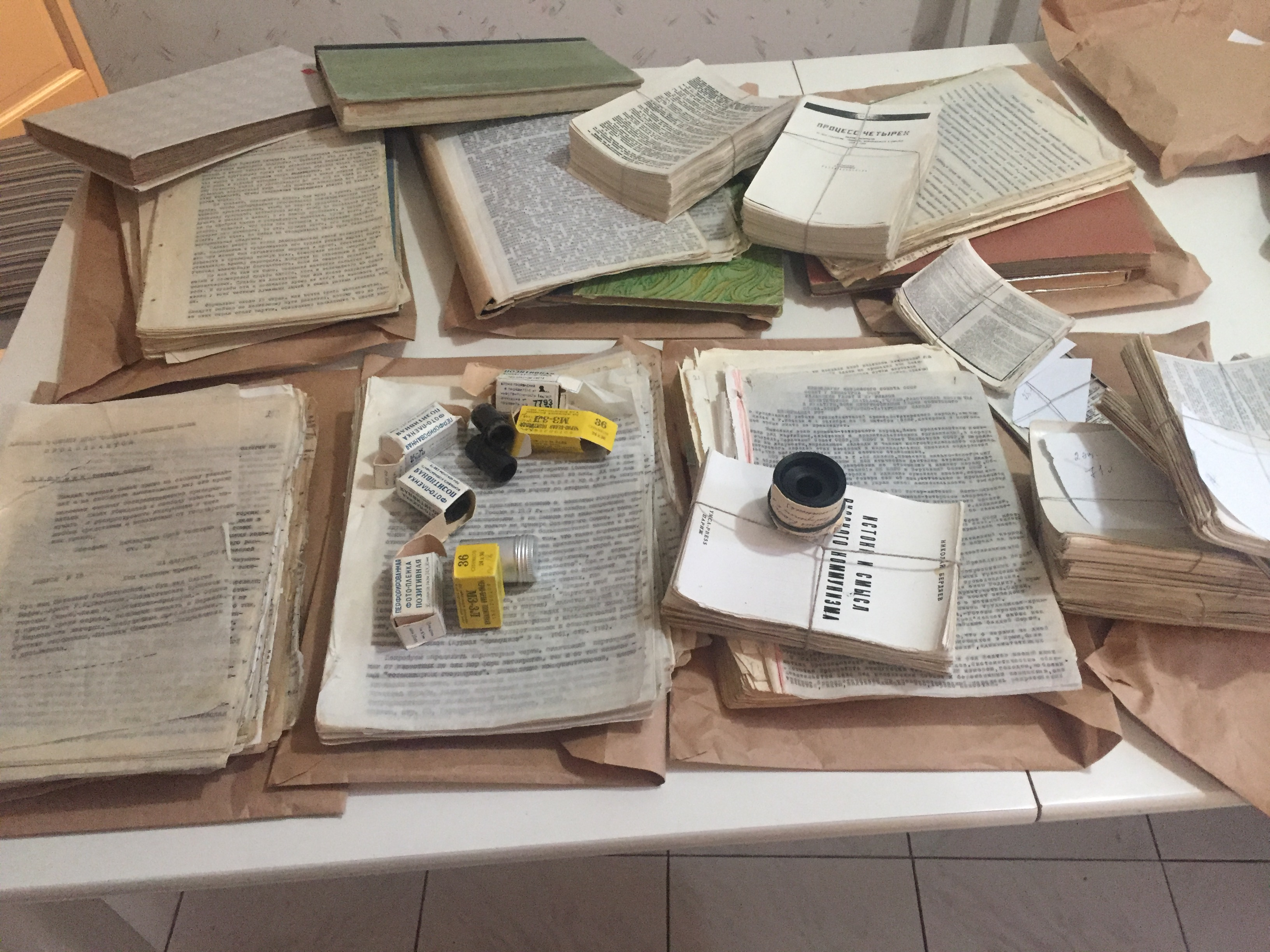
Typewritten text and microfilm of Avtorkhanov's books (center) smuggled into the Soviet Union for underground publishing

After the war, Avtorkhanov changed sides once again, this time going to work for the United States of America in Germany as a history instructor at the US Army Russian Area School, a training institute funded by the American military.

Avtorkhanov later became an early organizer of Radio Free Europe/Radio Liberty in 1951.

At the time of the First Chechen War he maintained a correspondence with the Chechen president Dzhokhar Dudayev. He also urged peace negotiations on Russian president Boris Yeltsin.

=== Criticism and support of his works ===
Autorkhanov authored numerous books and articles on the history and core issues of Communism. His book Staline au pouvoir (The Reign of Stalin), published in French in 1951, described Joseph Stalin's reign of terror.

His book Stalin and the Soviet Communist Party is regarded as an important source for the political background of Stalin's rise to power. He was one of the first authors to claim, in his 1976 book on Stalin's death, that Stalin had been murdered by the head of NKVD Lavrentiy Beria. Pyotr Grigorenko produced samizdat copies of the book in the Soviet Union by photographing and typewriting.

According to historian Alex Marshall, "His [Avtorkhanov] narration, in his memoirs and other writings, of both the Soviet deportations of the Chechens and Ingush in 1944, and of the scale of the political purges in Chechnia-Ingushetia during the 1930s, thereafter became the standard English-language source for Western scholars right up to the present. As late as 1998 and 2006, scholars of the eminence of John B. Dunlop and Moshe Gammer quoted Avtorkhanov’s version of events practically paragraph by paragraph when summarizing Soviet political repression in Chechnia-Ingushetia during the 1930s." and that Avtorkhanov "should therefore still have remained such a touchstone of Western studies of Russian-Chechen relations post-1991". However, according to Marshall, Avtorkhanov overstated "both the scale and manner of the [Stalinist] purges" of Soviet citizens, including the numbers of victims.

Historian Catherine Merridale notes of a "particularly vivid account" of an exchange at a Moscow Committee plenum between Nikolai Uglanov and Lazar Kaganovich for which Avtorkhanov provides direct quotations, "like all Avtorkahanov's reports of the dealings of the [Moscow Committee], however, it cannot be trusted without corroboration," adding that the purported source of the information cited by Avtorkhanov "does not appear on any list of [Moscow Committee] or [Moscow Control Commission] members I have seen."

Despite the criticism from some historians, Avtorkhanov's work, particularly his seminal 1959 book, The Technology of Power, enjoyed a warm reception. In 1991, a reprint edition of the formerly banned Technology of Power appeared in Russia, produced by the publishing house Slovo, with the full text serialized in the country's most prestigious historical journal, Voprosy istorii [Problems of History] in 22 installments from 1991 to 1993.

=== Death and legacy ===
Abdurakhman Avtorkhanov died in Munich, Germany, on April 24, 1997, shortly after the end of the Russian–Chechen war.

Among many in the Northern Cacasus region, Avtorkhanov remains a figure of high esteem for preserving the historical memory of oppressed nationalities. One of his books, Murder of Chechen-Ingush Nation, remains very popular among Chechens and Ingush today. A few months before the dissolution of the Soviet Union in 1991, Avtorkhanov was granted honorary citizenship by the Chechen-Ingush ASSR.

== Works ==
=== Books ===
- К основным вопросам истории Чечни: к десятилетию Советской Чечни. [On Fundamental Issues of the History of Chechnya: On the Occasion of the Tenth Anniversary of Soviet Chechnya] Grozny, 1930.
- Alexander Uralov (pseud.), The Reign of Stalin. [1951] L.J. Smith, trans. London: The Bodley Head, 1953.
- Stalin and the Soviet Communist Party: A Study in the Technology of Power. New York: Praeger. 1959.
- The Communist Party Apparatus, Chicago: Henry Regnery, 1966.
- Загадка смерти Сталина: заговор Берия.[The Mystery of Stalin's Death: Beria's Plot] Frankfurt/Main: Possev-Verlag, 1976.
- Сила и бессилие Брежнева. [The Power and Powerlessness of Brezhnev] Frankfurt/Main: Possev-Verlag, 1979.
- Мемуары. [Memoirs] Frankfurt/Main: Possev-Verlag, 1983.
- От Андропова к Горбачёву: Дела и дни Кремля. [From Andropov to Gorbachev: Deeds and Days of the Kremlin] Paris: YMCA–Press, 1986.
- Ленин в судьбах России: Размышления историка. [Lenin in the Destinies of Russia: Reflections of a Historian] Garmisch-Partenkirchen: Prometheus, 1990.
- The North Caucasus Barrier: The Russian Advance Towards the Muslim World. New York: St. Martin's, 1992.
- Происхождение партократии» ("The origin of Partocracy")— в 2 тт. (т. 1. ЦК и Ленин; т. 2. ЦК и Сталин) — 2-е изд. — Frankfurt/Main : Possev-Verlag, 1983.

=== Articles ===
- "Za vypolnenie direktiv partii po natsional'nomu voprosu" [For Completion of the Party's Directives on the National Question]. Pravda, No. 170 (June 22, 1930), p. 4.
- "Denationalization of the Soviet ethnic minorities," Studies on the Soviet Union, vol. 4, no. 1 (1964), pp. 74–99.
- "Question of a September 1936 Plenum of the CPSU Central Committee," With John Armstrong, Robert Slusser, and George Kennan. Slavic Review, vol. 26, no. 4 (Dec. 1967), pp. 665–677.
- "From Khrushchev to Brezhnev: The Problems of Collective Leadership," Institute for the Study of the USSR. Bulletin, vol. 15, no. 9 (Sept. 1968), pp. 14–15.

== See also ==
- List of Eastern Bloc defectors
- Magomed Shataev
