= Battle of Rice's Station =

Battle of the American Civil War

Coordinates: 37.2691°N 78.2947°W

- Part of the American Civil War
Date	April 6, 1865
Location	Prince Edward County, Virginia
Result	Union victory (Note: This is the conclusion reached by the National Park Service in the CWSAC Virginia Battlefield Profiles.)

Belligerents
United States (Union)	(Confederate States of America) Confederate States (Confederacy)

Commanders and leaders
John Gibbon	James Longstreet

Strength
7,500	6,800

Casualties and losses
66	Unknown probably few

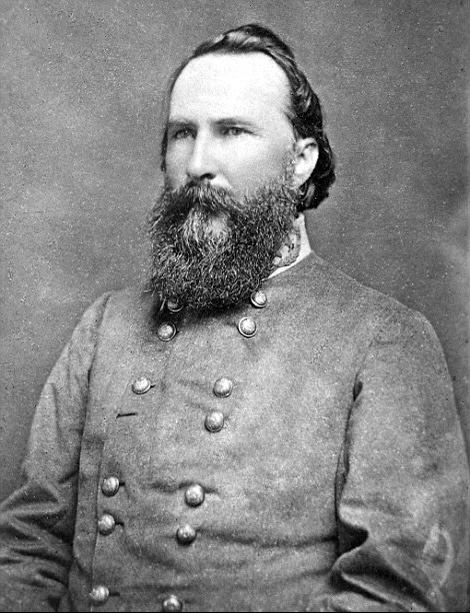
Lieutenant General James Longstreet

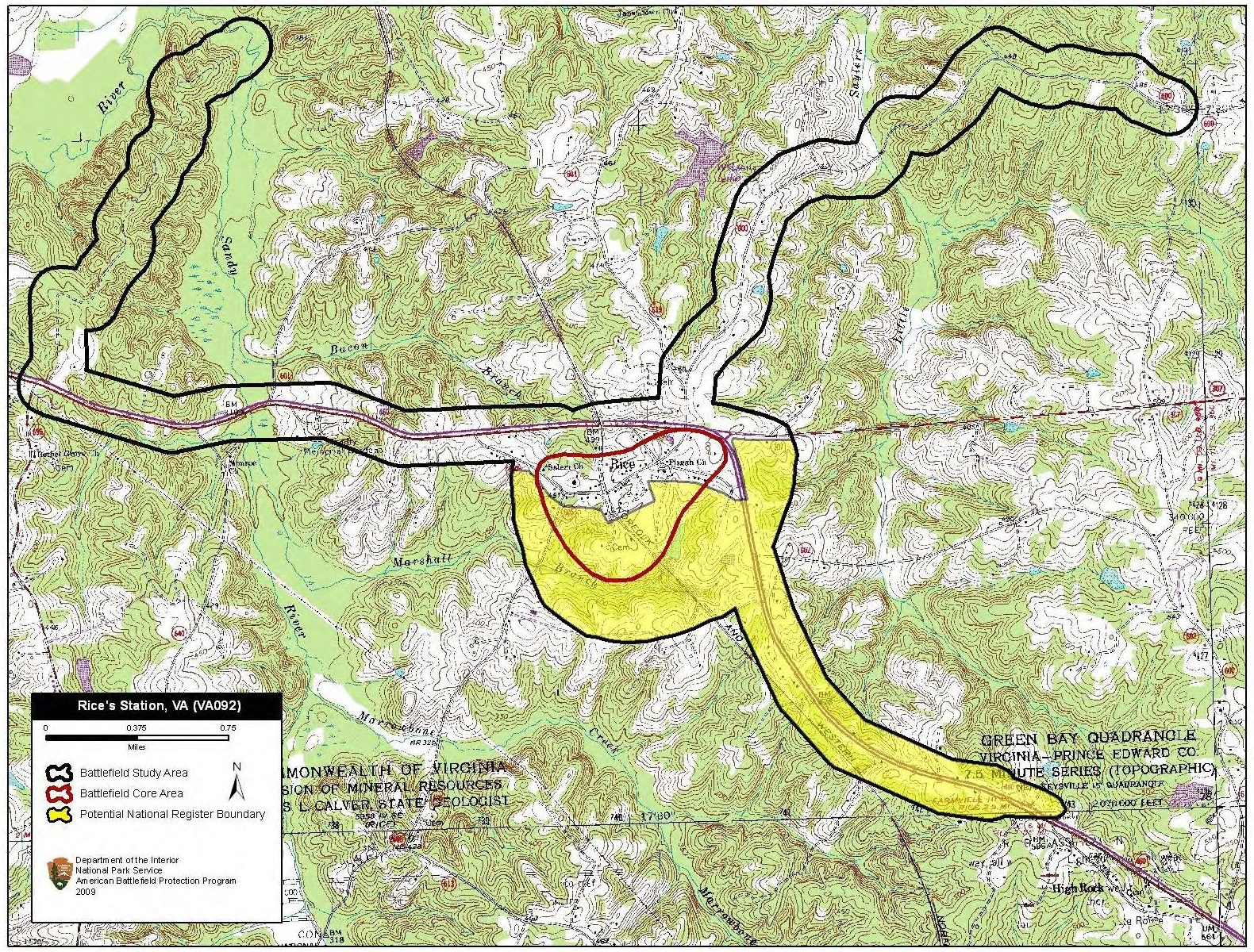
Map of Rice's Station Battlefield core and study areas by the American Battlefield Protection Program.

The Battle of Rice's Station was a minor engagement in Appomattox Campaign of the American Civil War that was fought at the same time as the Battle of Sailor's Creek on April 6, 1865. In the early morning of April 6, Confederate Lieutenant General James Longstreet's command reached Rice's Station, Virginia (now Rice, Virginia) on the South Side Railroad. As Longstreet's corps was the first to reach Rice's Station after Lee moved his army west from Amelia Springs, Virginia, they awaited the remainder of the army, most of which ended up being delayed at the Battle of Sailor's Creek.

The XXIV Corps commanded by Major General John Gibbon of Major General Edward Ord's Army of the James had occupied Burkeville Junction, Virginia, a junction of the South Side Railroad and Richmond and Danville Railroad to the southeast of Rice's Station, on the night of April 5. When Longstreet arrived at Rice's Station, he learned that Ord's troops were at Burkeville Junction. Longstreet ordered his men to dig in along the tracks and routes from Burkeville in case the XXIV Corps advanced toward them.

During the morning of April 6, after being warned that Lee's Army was on the march, Ord and Gibbon had moved cautiously up the railroad and found Longstreet's force digging in near Rice's Station. Gibbon's skirmishers slowly formed for an attack and had a minor confrontation with the entrenched Confederates. As darkness approached and being unsure of the size of the Confederate force, Ord decided to wait for Sheridan and Meade to come up from behind.

The Union force suffered 66 casualties before going into bivouac as darkness approached. Exact Confederate casualties are unknown.

With the Union Army nearby after the disastrous Confederate defeat at Sailor's Creek, under General Lee's order, Longstreet withdrew during the night towards Farmville, Virginia where rations were waiting.
