= Samuel V. Wilson =

United States Army general

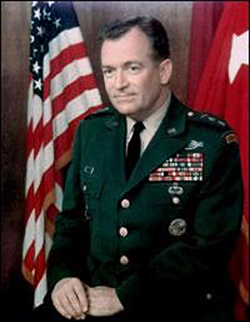
- LTG Samuel V. Wilson
- Born: Samuel Vaughan Wilson; September 23, 1923; Rice, Virginia, U.S.
- Died: June 10, 2017 (aged 93); Rice, Virginia, U.S.
- Military career
- Allegiance: United States of America
- Branch: United States Army
- Service years: 1940–1977 (37 years)
- Rank: Lieutenant general
- Nickname: "General Sam"
- Units: Office of Strategic Services; 5307th Composite Unit (Provisional) "Merrill's Maurauders"
- Commands: Director, Defense Intelligence Agency; 6th Special Forces Group
- Conflicts: World War II; Cold War * Vietnam War
- Awards: Distinguished Service Cross; Defense Distinguished Service Medal; Army Distinguished Service Medal (3); Silver Star (2); Legion of Merit (2); Bronze Star (2) with Valor device
- Other work: Technical Advisor, Merrill's Marauders; Chairman, Special Operations Policy Group (SOPAG); Professor/Political Science & President, Hampden-Sydney College

Samuel Vaughan Wilson (September 23, 1923 – June 10, 2017), also known as General Sam, was a United States Army lieutenant general who completed his active military career in the fall of 1977, having divided his service almost equally between special operations and intelligence assignments.

He served as 22nd President of Hampden-Sydney College from 1992–2000 and as 5th Director of the Defense Intelligence Agency from May 1976-August 1977; for his foundational work in doctrine for low intensity conflict, where he coined the term "counterinsurgency" (COIN); and for facilitating the drafting and passage of the Nunn-Cohen Amendment to the 1987 Defense Authorization Act, effectively creating the US Special Operations Command (USSOCOM) and the Office of the Assistant Secretary of Defense for Special Operations and Low Intensity Conflict (ASD/SOLIC). He is also credited with helping to create Delta Force, the U.S. Army's premier counterterrorism unit.

As a general officer, some of his assignments included: Assistant Division Commander (Operations), 82nd Airborne Division; (First) United States Defense Attaché to the Soviet Union, Deputy to the Central Intelligence for the Intelligence Community, and Director of the Defense Intelligence Agency. In his post-military career, he began working at Hampden-Sydney College in 1977, first as a Professor of Political Science, then as its 22nd President, and subsequently as Wheat Professor of Leadership at the Wilson Center for Leadership in the Public Interest. Wilson altogether was part of Hampden-Sydney for forty years.

Wilson died from lung cancer on June 10, 2017 in Rice, Virginia, age 93.

== Early life ==
A native of Rice, Virginia, Samuel Vaughan Wilson grew up on a tobacco, corn and wheat farm in Southside Virginia hard by the Saylers Creek battlefield, where on 6 April 1865, the Army of Northern Virginia fought its final battle before limping on westward to surrender three days later at Appomattox Courthouse. As a boy, Sam Wilson often rode his pony over the battlefield area looking for the footprint of two armies locked in combat. What still remained of his spare time after arduous farm chores was spent hunting, fishing, reading and pursuing his musical interests. His mother had been a public school teacher, and his father was a ruling elder in the local Presbyterian church. Both parents taught at Sunday school, his mother was his first Sunday School teacher and raised the Wilson siblings in the church. Both parents influenced their children to love books and enjoy reading, especially history.

Sam began his formal education in the fall of 1929, daily walking the two miles one-way to Rice High School and return to the farm. He graduated at the head of his class on 26 May 1940. Two weeks later he jogged seven miles through a rainy night from the family farm to the local National Guard armory, where he added two years to his actual age to qualify and was sworn into military service.

== Education ==
Lieutenant General Wilson is a graduate of the Infantry Officer Advanced Course, the United States Army Command and General Staff College and the Air War College, where he was the distinguished graduate in the Class of 1964. Following World War II, General Wilson studied at Columbia University and in Europe as a member of the US Army Foreign Area Specialist Training Program (FASTP), later known as the Foreign Area Officer (FAO) Program, mastering several languages and becoming a specialist on the former Soviet Union. He has attended a number of night schools, taken numerous correspondence courses and is the recipient of several honorary degrees.

== Military career ==
Sam Wilson joined the 116th Infantry Regiment, (Virginia National Guard) as a 16-year-old private bugler in June 1940. By early 1942, he had become successively a squad leader, platoon sergeant and acting first sergeant before being sent to Infantry Officer Candidate School (OCS), where he graduated as an 18-year-old second lieutenant at the head of his class and was selected to remain at The Infantry School, Fort Benning, Georgia, as an instructor.

As a young officer, Wilson taught guerrilla and counterguerrilla tactics at the Infantry School at Fort Benning, Georgia, in 1942 and 1943. In 1943, already a first lieutenant at the age of 19, he joined the Office of Strategic Services (OSS) and subsequently responded to a presidential call for volunteers for "a dangerous and hazardous mission" to be undertaken by an elite regimental-sized unit. This move resulted in his becoming chief reconnaissance officer for the 5307th Composite Unit (Provisional), better known as Merrill's Marauders, which operated behind enemy lines in Burma during World War II. His role in that theater was later memorialized in Charlton Ogburn's book The Marauders, which subsequently was made into the 1962 film Merrill's Marauders (film). Then-Lt. Col. Wilson served as technical advisor for the film and was cast as General Merrill's deputy "Bannister" under the pseudonym Vaughan Wilson; he also appeared in the film trailer introducing the film and narrating the trailer.

Upon returning to the US from the China-Burma- India Theater as a combat veteran in fall 1944 with his fifth consecutive appointment in hand to the US Military Academy, Wilson was denied admission to West Point for medical reasons. His tour in Burma had ended with multiple medical ailments, including malaria, amoebic dysentery, mite typhus and severe malnutrition. He returned to the Infantry School where he developed and taught courses in military leadership for the next two years.

During this period he applied for and was granted a commission in the Regular Army. This move exposed that he had been a fraudulent enlistment, having told a "white lie" earlier about his age, and resulted in his being appointed a second lieutenant in the Regular Army as of age 21—by which time he had already become a combat-experienced captain, Army of the United States (AUS).

In September 1947, although he was only a high school graduate from a small rural school, he entered the Army's Foreign Area Specialist Training Program (FASTP) and was enrolled in graduate school at Columbia University, specializing in the Russian language and related background and area subjects.

Following a successful stint in graduate school, he was assigned for 3 1/2 years to Europe as a language and area student, where he developed near-native fluency in the Russian language, as well as a working knowledge of several other languages. Noteworthy extra-curricular activities during this period included being assigned to the State Department's Diplomatic Pouch and Courier Service, which led to extensive travels throughout the Iron Curtain countries and the Soviet Union, as well as to other countries peripheral to the USSR; functioning as an official interpreter in Berlin, Potsdam and Vienna; and serving in a liaison capacity with elements of the Soviet armed forces in East Germany and in Eastern Austria.

Newly promoted to major, Wilson returned to Washington and was assigned to the Army General Staff (Intelligence) in fall 1951, where he handled a variety of sensitive special projects until reassignment to attend the Infantry Officers Advanced Course in 1953. Upon graduation from this course, he was placed on special assignment in the Office of the Secretary of Defense, where he worked on Operations Coordinating Board (OCB) matters as a consultant on Soviet affairs. In the fall of 1955, Wilson began a three -year assignment with CIA's clandestine services, serving part of this period as a CIA case officer running a series of clandestine operations against the Soviet Union from a cover office in West Berlin.

Following completion of the US Army Command and General Staff Course and promotion to lieutenant colonel, Wilson was assigned in June 1959 as Director of Instruction of the US Army Special Warfare School, Fort Bragg, NC. Over the next two years, he gained considerable notoriety for his foundational work on doctrine for small wars, insurgency and counter-insurgency. In June 1961, he was appointed Deputy Assistant to the Secretary of Defense for Special Operations, serving in that capacity for the next two years and playing a key staff support role at such critical moments as the Cuban Missile Crisis of October 1962.

Upon graduation from the US Air War College in Spring 1964, LTC Wilson was placed on loan with the State Department and assigned to the US Agency for International Development (USAID) under the terms of the Participating Agency Service Agreement (PASA). In this capacity, he was employed at the temporary rank-equivalent of a class one foreign service officer and posted to Vietnam as Associate Director for Field Operations, where he was concerned with pacification and nation building efforts by the Americans and South Vietnamese. Some sixteen months later, he was appointed by the US Ambassador to Vietnam as United States Mission Coordinator and Minister-Counselor of the US Embassy in Saigon, receiving in connection with this latter post a presidential appointment to the personal rank of Minister.

Returning to active military duty in the summer of 1967, Wilson, now an Army colonel—his military service had been continued for promotion and retirement purposes during his temporary foreign service appointment—assumed command at Fort Bragg of the 6th Special Forces Group (Airborne), with a mission orientation on the Middle East. He was shifted from this post in late 1969 to the position of Assistant Commandant of the newly named US Army John F. Kennedy Institute for Military Assistance (formerly the US Army Special Warfare School), where he again worked on doctrinal concepts pertaining to the role and mission of US military advisors—especially in insurgency, counter-insurgency and nation building environments—and played a key role in the establishment of the Military Assistance Officers Program (MAOP), which subsequently was merged with the Army's Foreign Area Specialist Training Program (FASTP) under the designation Foreign Area Officers Program (FAOP). Upon being selected for promotion to brigadier general in the summer of 1970, he was assigned as Assistant Division Commander for Operations, 82nd Airborne Division.

Between 1971 and 1973 Brigadier General Wilson was US Defense Attaché (USDATT) in the US embassy in Moscow, USSR, at the height of the Cold War. He was the first general officer to hold that particular portfolio. (He reportedly was the CIA Chief of Station during that same period.) A former US Marine corporal recalls in an article that Wilson knew each embassy Marine by name and was considered "our general" by the Marine contingent there.General Wilson's 1971–73 tour in Moscow was marked by his achievement of professional rapport with senior officers of the Soviet military high command. His near-native fluency in Russian, plus that he earlier had majored in Russian and Soviet history—especially military history—as well as having practically memorized the major battles on the Soviet-German front during the course of World War II, provided an unforeseen opportunity into Soviet military circles which he fully took advantage of. His insights into Soviet strategic and doctrinal thinking gained thereby were subsequently recognized as critically useful to policy makers and planners of the US national security establishment.

Wilson returned to the US, and between 1973 and 1976 held positions in the Defense Intelligence Agency as Deputy Director for Estimates and Deputy Director for Attaché Affairs, followed by an assignment in the rank of lieutenant general as Deputy to the Director of Central Intelligence for the Intelligence Community (D/DCI/IC.)

In May 1976, Wilson, now a lieutenant general, was appointed as the new Director of the Defense Intelligence Agency and oversaw the agency through "the death of Mao Zedong, aircraft hijackings, unrest in South Africa, and continuing Mideast dissension." Director Wilson gave a speech to retired intelligence officers in September 1976, which was declassified in 1993 and included the following notable excerpts:

The revelation of true intelligence secrets makes exciting reading in the morning paper. It is soon forgotten by most readers, but not by our adversaries. Enormously complex and expensive technical intelligence collection systems can be countered. Need I remind this particular audience that dedicated and courageous men and women who risk their lives to help America can be exposed and destroyed? I don't think the American people want this to happen especially when our adversaries—dedicated to the proposition that we eventually must be defeated—are hard at work. But Americans must understand or they will inadvertently cause this to happen. [O]ur primary function is to provide the leadership of this nation with the deepest possible understanding of the military, political, social, and economic climate of countries that affect vital American interests. Our mission is to see that our leaders know about what may happen in the world beyond our borders and about the forces and factors at work there. The American taxpayer should know we do this job well, despite our problems.

Wilson is also credited with the statement "Ninety percent of intelligence comes from open sources. The other ten percent, the clandestine work, is just the more dramatic. The real intelligence hero is Sherlock Holmes, not James Bond."

Due to the precarious health condition of his wife, Wilson retired on 31 August 1977.

== Civilian career ==
After leaving the Army and DIA directorship in August 1977, Wilson began teaching at Hampden-Sydney College in Hampden-Sydney, Virginia and continued to consult with and provide advice to intelligence leaders, legislators and U.S. presidents, including former CIA Director William Colby, then-Senator Al Gore and President George H. W. Bush.

In 1992, Wilson became President of Hampden-Sydney College and served an 8-year term during which he shepherded the college through major challenges such as the college's contentious internal debate over whether to remain all-male (it did) and a major capital campaign drive. He remained involved on campus as a fellow of the eponymous Wilson Center for Leadership in the Public Interest.

In 1993, Wilson was inducted into the U.S. Army Ranger Hall of Fame "for heroism, extraordinary achievement, and continued service to his country and the special operations community."

General Wilson is also a member of the Military Intelligence Hall of Fame. He was a featured interviewee in Ken Burns' documentary series The Vietnam War (2017), which aired posthumously.

=== Post-military activities ===
Activities following retirement from the Army and DIA Directorship in August 1977 include the following:

- 1977–81 Participated in consultant capacity in organization and development of the US Army 1st Special Forces Operational Detachment - Delta ("Delta Force")
- 1978–90 Senior Consultant BETAC Corporation
- 1980 Vice Chairman of special commission to review aborted (Iranian Hostage Rescue Mission)
- 1980–86 Chairman, Korean War|Virginia Korea-Viet Nam War History Commission
- 1982–92 Adjunct Professor of Political Science, Hampden-Sydney College, Virginia
- 1983–87 Vice Chairman, Longwood College Board of Visitors
- 1985–87 Part-time consultant to Senate and House Armed Service Committees on US Special Operations. Here he won special recognition for his role as facilitator of what became the Nunn–Cohen Amendment to the 1987 Defense Authorization Act, establishing the US Special Operations Command and the Office of Assistant Secretary of Defense for Special Operations and Low-Intensity Conflict (ASD/SOLIC).
- 1985–91 Member Governor's Biracial Advisory Board on Higher Education in Virginia
- 1992–2000 22nd President of Hampden-Sydney College
  (Note: During an 8-year term he shepherded Hampden-Sydney through major challenges such as the college's contentious internal debate over whether to remain all-male /it did/ and a major capital campaign drive.)
- 2000 President Emeritus of Hampden-Sydney College and Wheat Professor of Leadership
- 2007 Named first "Wilson Fellow" in Samuel V. Wilson Center for Leadership in the Public Interest, Hampden-Sydney College
  (Note: Although working in a part-time retirement status, General Wilson continued as a pro bono consultant in the Special Operations and Intelligence arenas at various levels in the US Government.
- 2014 Lt. Gen. Sam Wilson, U.S. Army, Retired, was inducted as a Distinguished Member of the Special Forces Regiment during a private ceremony at the Wilson Center for Leadership on the campus of Hampden-Sydney College hosted by LTG Charles Cleveland, the commanding general of the U.S. Army Special Operations Command located at Fort Bragg, N.C.

A recent letter to him from General David H. Petraeus, Commanding General, USCENTCOM, reflects the fact that Wilson's earlier work on doctrine for small wars, insurgency, counterinsurgency and nation-building is still considered to be useful.

== Military awards, decorations and badges ==
Lieutenant General Wilson's personal awards and decorations include the Distinguished Service Cross, Defense Distinguished Service Medal, Distinguished Service Medal (U.S. Army) with two Oak Leaf Clusters, Silver Star for "Gallantry in action" with Oak Leaf Cluster, Legion of Merit with Oak Leaf Cluster, Bronze Star for Valor with Oak Leaf Cluster, Army Commendation Medal with two Oak Leaf Clusters, Army Good Conduct Medal (for enlisted service), American Defense Service Medal, Asia-Pacific Campaign Medal with two stars, World War II Victory Medal, American Campaign Service Medal, National Defense Service Medal, Armed Forces Expeditionary Medal, Vietnam Service Medal with four stars, Army Service Ribbon, Army Overseas Service Ribbon with numeral 2, the Vietnam Gallantry Cross with Palm, and the Vietnam Campaign Medal.

Unit awards include the Presidential Unit Citation, and the Vietnam Gallantry Cross Unit Citation.

Badges include the Combat Infantryman Badge, Master Parachutist Badge, Joint Staff Identification, Army General Staff Identification Badge, Office of the Secretary of Defense Identification Badge, Defense Intelligence Agency Badge, and the Expert Marksmanship Badge.

General Wilson is also the recipient of the National Intelligence Distinguished Service Medal (2x), the USSOCOM Medal, the CIA Distinguished Intelligence Medal, the William Oliver Baker Award, the Arthur D. "Bull" Simon Award (Special Operations), the Annual Rylander Award from the National Defense Industrial Association (NDIA), SOLIC Division, for outstanding contributions in Special Operations and Low Intensity Conflict (SO/LIC), and the Military Intelligence Corps Association Knowlton Award.

He received the following awards from other nations: The Vietnam Gallantry Cross with Palm (Republic of Vietnam), the Vietnamese National Administration Medal for Exemplary Service, Vietnam Campaign Medal (Republic of Vietnam).

He was awarded the George Washington Honor Medal by the Freedoms Foundation of Valley Forge in 1976.

U.S. military decorations
Distinguished Service Cross
Defense Distinguished Service Medal
Distinguished Service Medal (U.S. Army) with two Oak Leaf Clusters
Silver Star awarded for "Gallantry in action" with Oak Leaf Cluster
Legion of Merit with 1 Oak Leaf Cluster
Bronze Star Medal with Valor Device with Oak Leaf Cluster
Purple Heart
Joint Service Commendation Medal
Army Commendation Medal with 2 Oak Leaf Clusters
USSOCOM Medal
Army Good Conduct Medal
American Defense Service Medal
American Campaign Medal
Asiatic-Pacific Campaign Medal with 2 Stars
World War II Victory Medal
Army of Occupation Medal
National Defense Service Medal with 1 Star
Armed Forces Expeditionary Medal
Vietnam Service Medal with 4 stars
Army Service Ribbon
Army Overseas Service Ribbon with bronze award numeral 2
Vietnam Gallantry Cross with palm
Vietnam Chuong My Medal, 1st class
Vietnam Campaign Medal
Unit awards
Army Presidential Unit Citation
Vietnam Gallantry Cross Unit Citation
Qualification badges
Combat Infantryman Badge
Ranger Tab
Master Parachutist Badge
Army Staff Identification Badge
Office of the Secretary of Defense Identification Badge
Office of the Joint Chiefs of Staff Identification Badge
Defense Intelligence Agency Badge
Expert Marksmanship Badge
Military Assistance Command Vietnam (MACV) Combat Service Identification Badge
National non-military awards
National Intelligence Distinguished Service Medal (2 awards)
CIA Distinguished Intelligence Medal

=== Selected other recognition and awards ===
- 1966 Appointed to personal rank of Minister by President of the United States
- 1977 US Army Infantry Hall of Fame
- 1987 US Military Intelligence Hall of Fame
- 1987 Professor Emeritus, US Army John F. Kennedy Special Warfare Center & School
- 1988 Defense Intelligence Agency US Attaché Hall of Fame
- 1989 Appointed Honorary Colonel, 75th US Army Ranger Regiment
- 1992 Named State of Virginia Cultural Laureate for Public Service by Virginia Cultural Laureate Foundation
- 1993 U.S. Army Ranger Hall of Fame "for heroism, extraordinary achievement, and continued service to his country and the special operations community."
- 1994 First recipient of General Doolittle Educator of the Year Award for Distinguished Service to Special Operations Education
- 1994 Professor Emeritus for Collection Operations, National Defense Intelligence College (formerly the Joint Military Intelligence College), Defense Intelligence Agency
- 2000 President Emeritus, Hampden-Sydney College

== Filmography ==
- Merrill's Marauders (1962)
- The Vietnam War (2017)
  Government offices
  Preceded by Daniel O. Graham	Director of the Defense Intelligence Agency; 1976–1977	Succeeded by Eugene F. Tighe
  Academic offices
  Preceded by Ralph Arthur Rossum	President of Hampden-Sydney College; 1992–2000	Succeeded by Walter M. Bortz III
