= Sailor's Creek Battlefield Historical State Park =

State park in Virginia, USA

Sailor's Creek Battlefield Historical State Park (Prince Edward County, Virginia), Rice, Virginia, U.S.A.
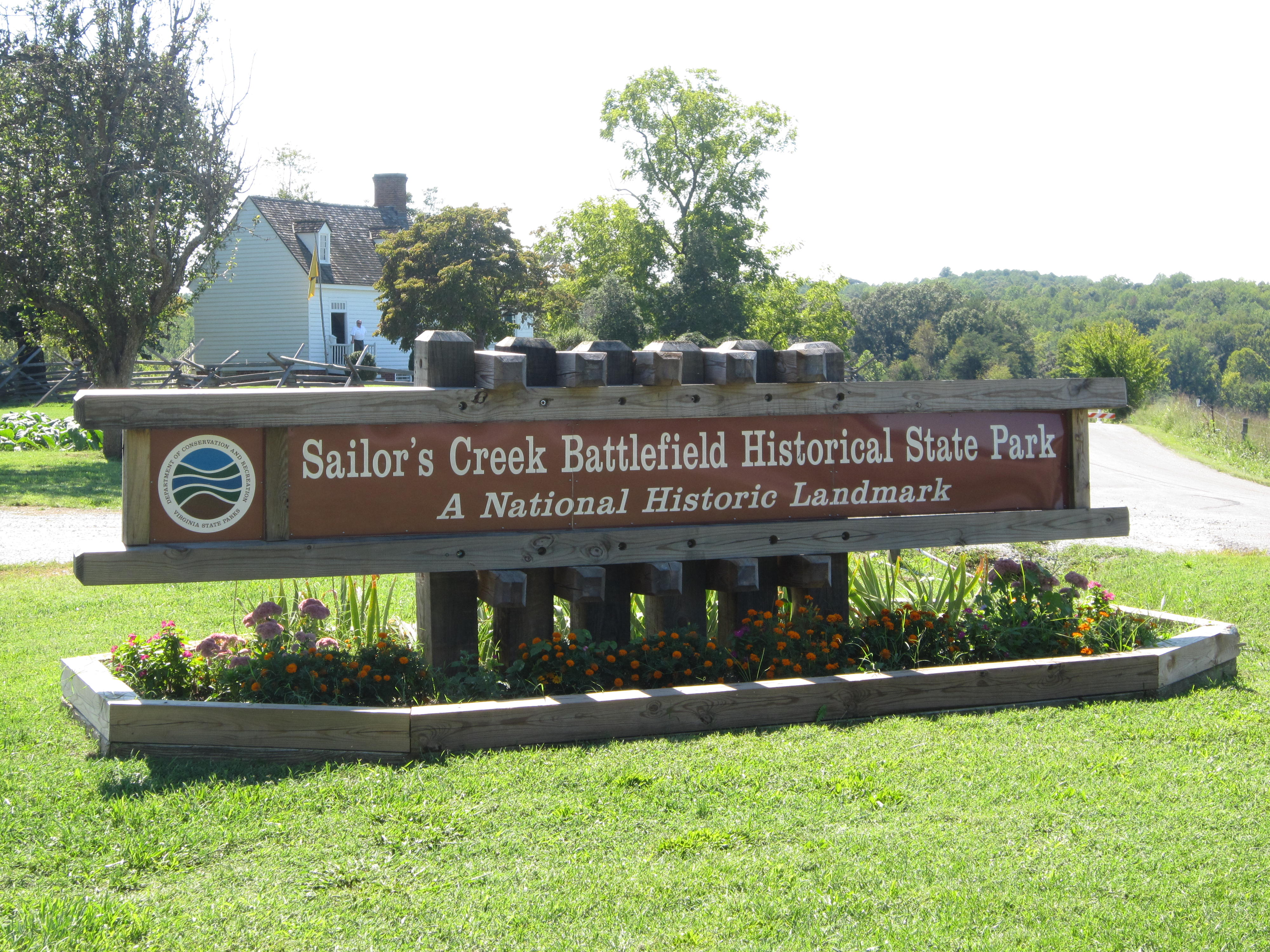
- Entry sign, with the Overton-Hillsman House in the background

- Location within Virginia Location within the United States
- Location: 6541 Saylers Creek Road, (Prince Edward County), Rice, Virginia 23966
- Coordinates: 37°10′43.7154″N 78°8′14.5386″W
- Area: 379 acres (153 ha)
- Established: 1985
- Governing body: Virginia Department of Conservation and Recreation

Sailor's Creek Battlefield Historical State Park is a 379-acre (153 ha) state park near Rice, Virginia, located mostly in Amelia County with a small portion in Prince Edward County. It includes a portion of the landmarked Sayler's Creek Battlefield, an area of 1,022 acres (414 ha) that was the site of the April 6, 1865 Battle of Sayler's Creek, one of the last major engagements in the Eastern Theater of the war involving Confederate General-in-Chief Robert E. Lee (1807–1870). The battle occurred during his week-long retreat to the southwest in the final Appomattox campaign from the fallen Confederate capital at Richmond and nearby Petersburg, three days before his surrender at Appomattox Court House to Union Army General-in-Chief Ulysses S. Grant (1822–1885), which effectively ended the American Civil War (1861–1865).

Besides the historical Hillsman House, a visitors center including exhibits with artifacts and memorabilia, park ranger talks and lectures, walking trails, and interpretive plaques, the park also offers such amenities as picnic tables and barbecue grills available for use.

The Hillsman House on the site was used as a field hospital during and after the battle, and is open to visitors in the summer and by request. The park also occasionally hosts "living history" events with Civil War soldier and civilian reenactors.

The park name appears to be a misspelling of “Sayler,” a farmer after whose land and the stream for which the Battle of Sayler's Creek was afterwards later named in 1865. Some official records such as those of the National Historic Landmark program refer to this park as being named the Sayler's Creek Battlefield State Park.

== Gallery ==
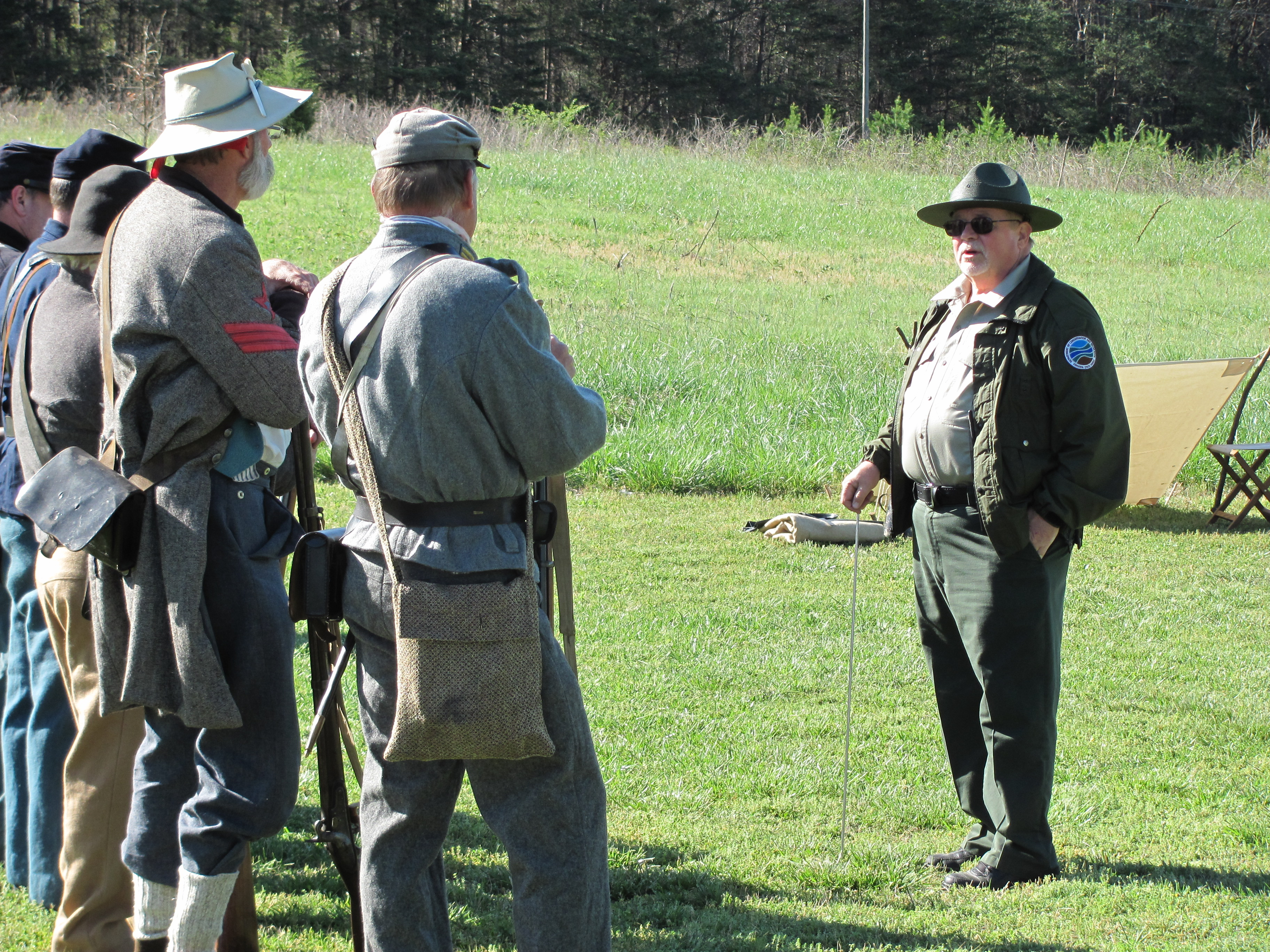
A park ranger speaks to reenactors at the park, 2012

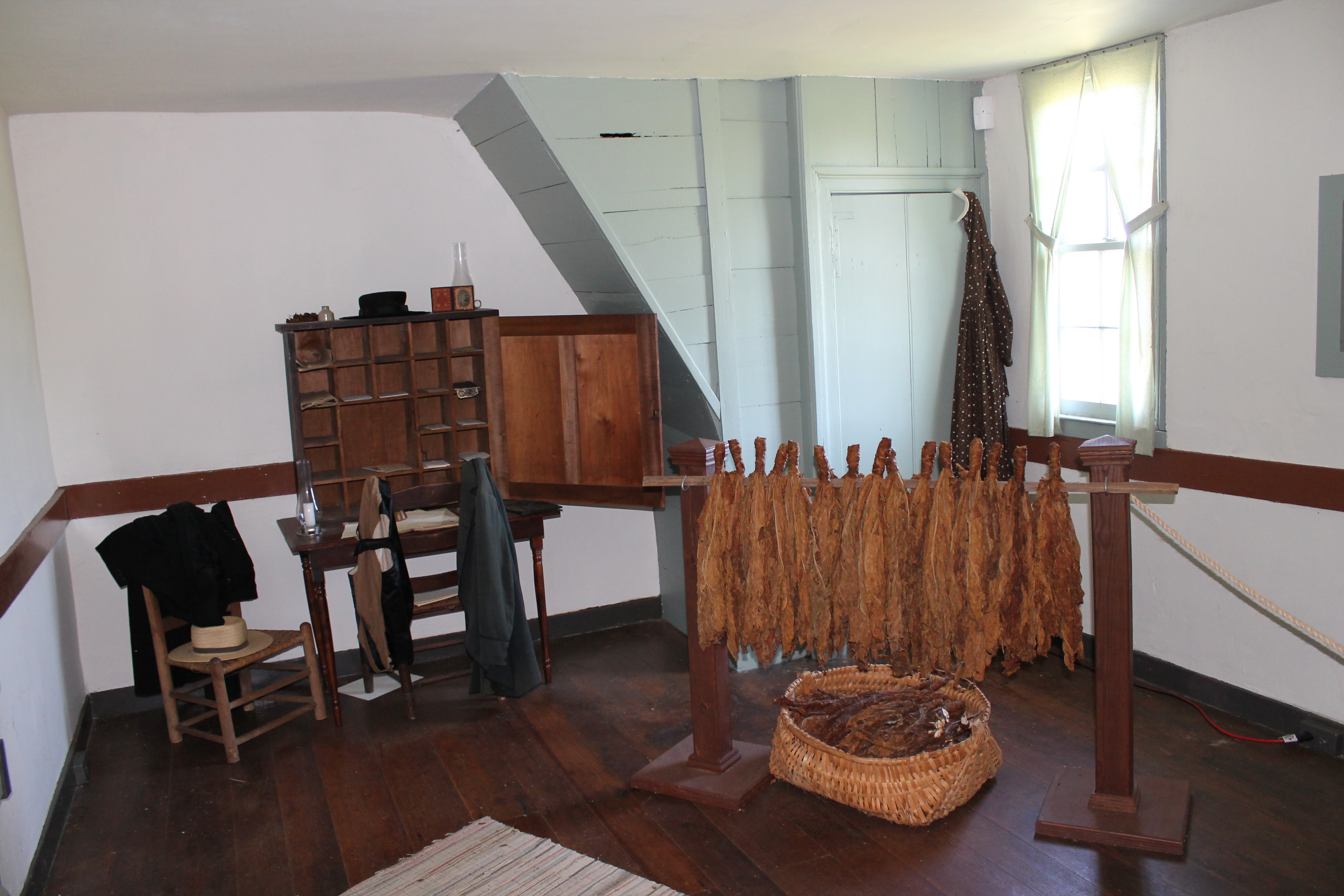
Displays in the Overton-Hillsman House

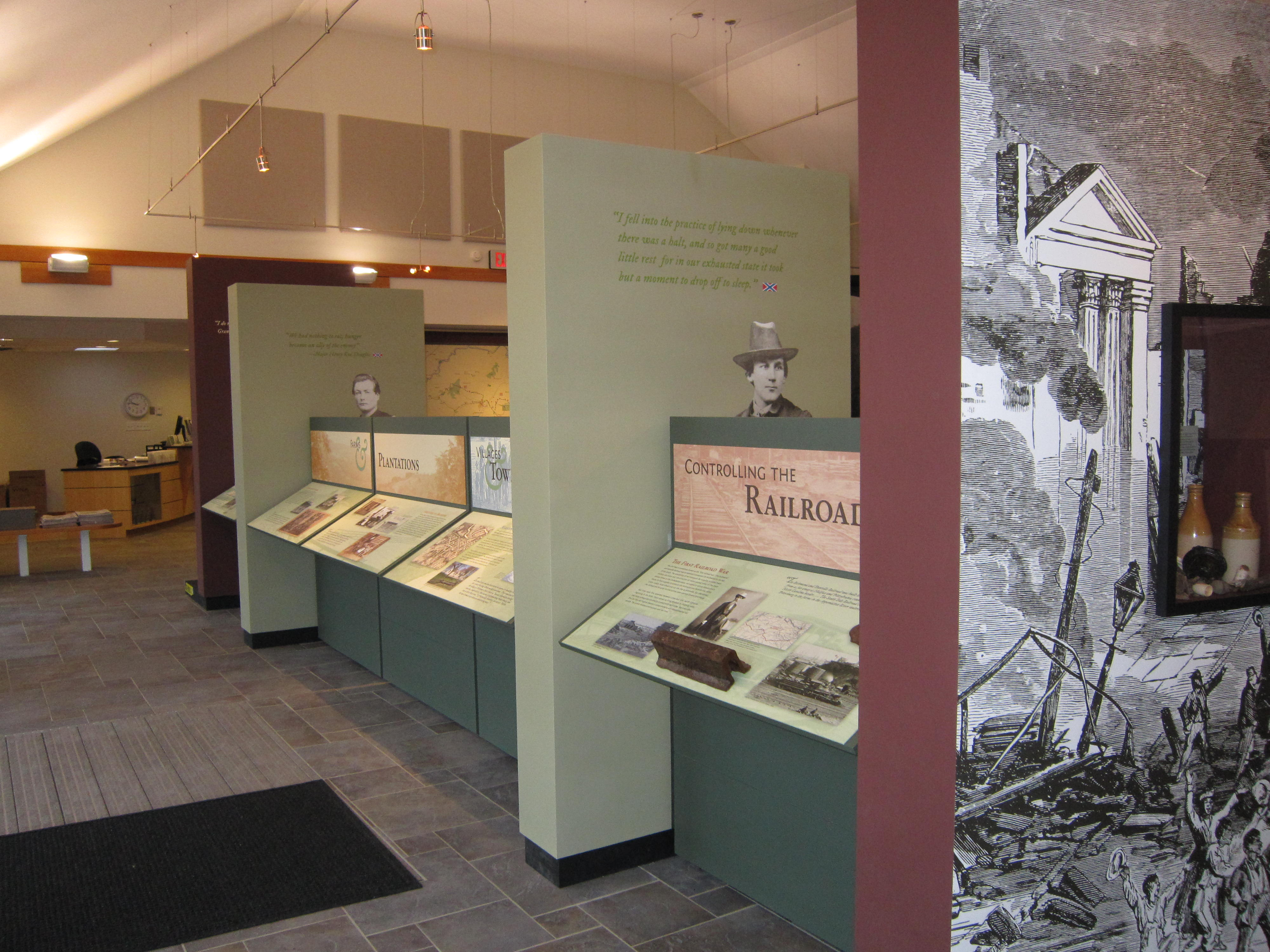
Exhibits at the visitor center

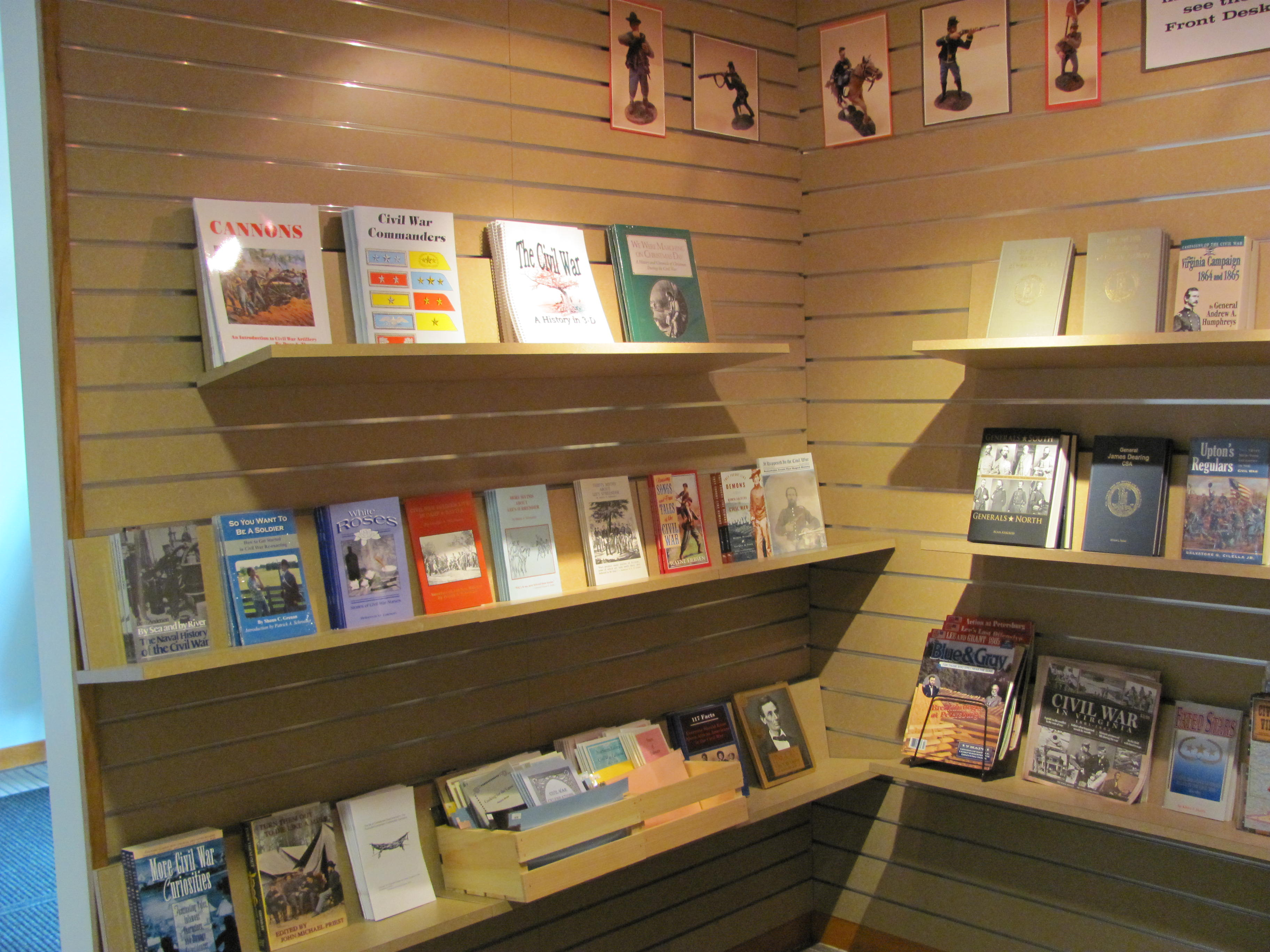
Items for sale in the gift shop

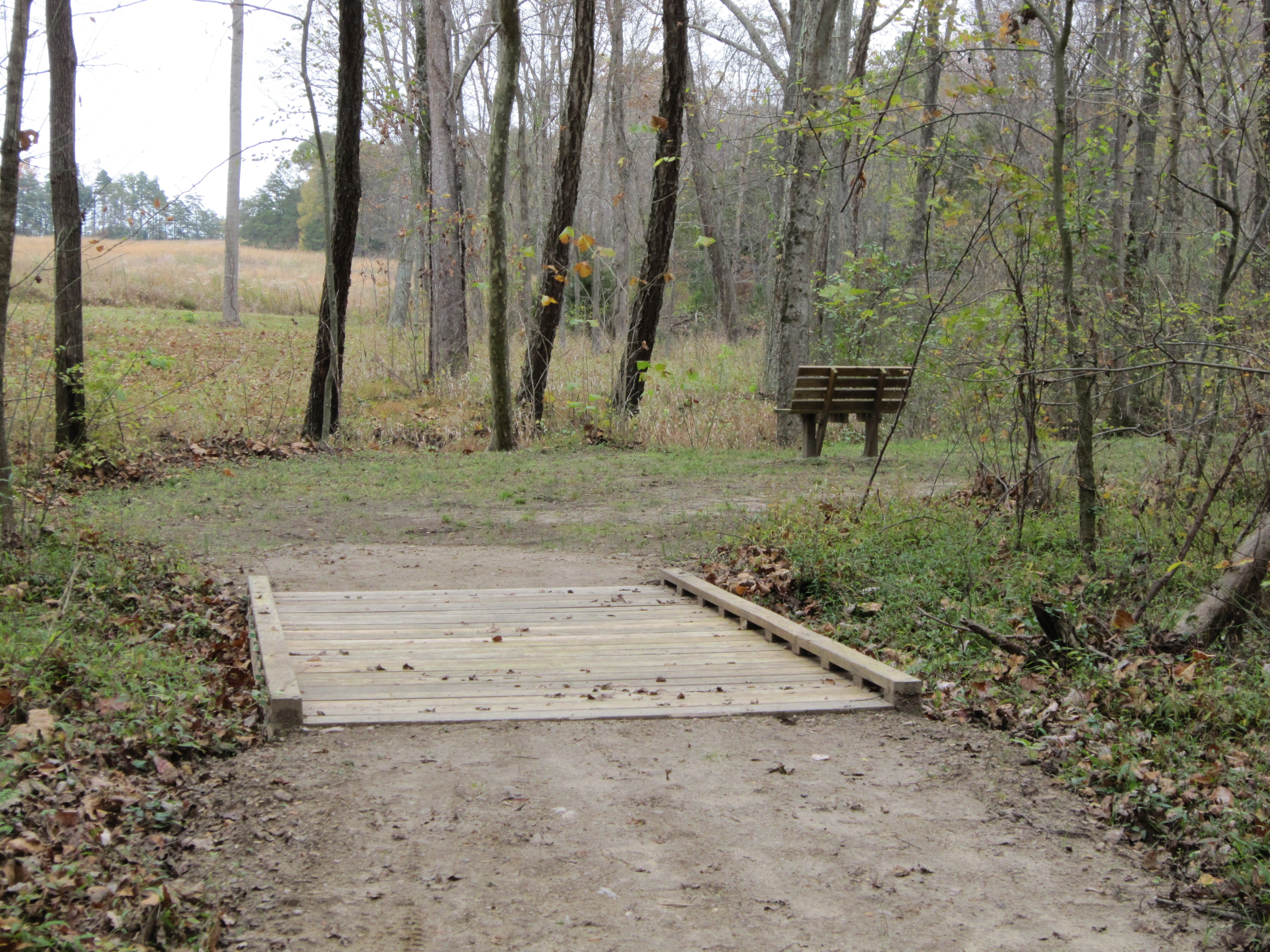
Lands along the Confederate Overlook Trail

== See also ==
- List of Virginia state parks
- List of Virginia state forests
