= Sayler's Creek Battlefield =

- U.S. National Register of Historic Places
- U.S. National Historic Landmark
- Virginia Landmarks Register
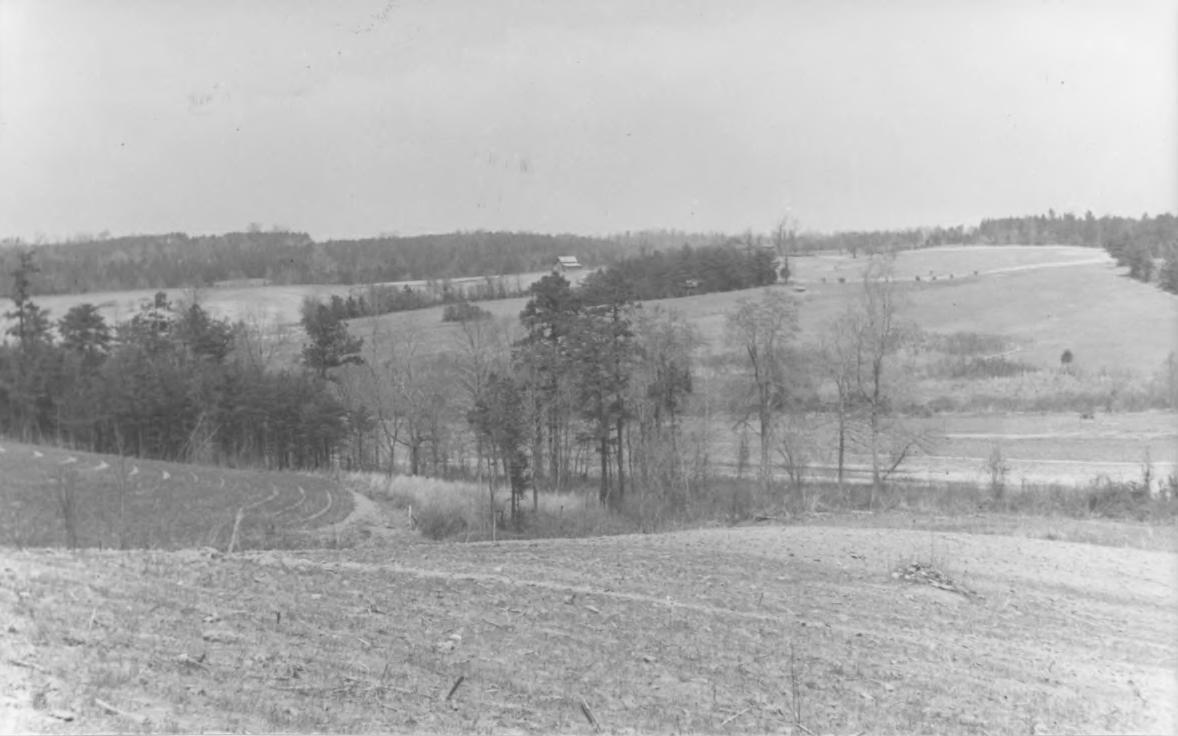
- View from Ewell's right across Sayler's Creek (Hillsman House in background), 1936 NPS photo

- Location within Virginia Location within the United States
- Location: Amelia / Prince Edward counties, Virginia, USA
- Nearest city: Farmville, Virginia
- Coordinates: 37°19′04″N 78°14′02″W
- Area: 1,022 acres (4.14 km^{2})
- Architect: Overton
- Architectural style: Colonial, 1 1/2 stories
- NRHP reference No.: 85002436
- VLR No.: 004-0019

Significant dates
- Added to NRHP: February 4, 1985
- Designated NHL: February 4, 1985
- Designated VLR: October 16, 1984

Sayler's Creek Battlefield, near Farmville, Virginia, was the site of the Battle of Sayler's Creek of the American Civil War. Confederate general Robert E. Lee's army was retreating from the Richmond to the Petersburg line. Here, on April 6, 1865, Union general Philip Sheridan cut off and beat back about a quarter of Lee's depleted army. Eight Confederate generals surrendered, and 7,700 men were lost. Confederate Major General George Washington Custis Lee, eldest son of Robert E. Lee, was forcibly captured on the battlefield by Private David Dunnels White of the 37th Massachusetts Regiment. The battle was the last major engagement of the war in Virginia; Lee's surrender at Appomattox occurred three days later. A portion of the landmarked battlefield area is included in Sailor's Creek Battlefield Historical State Park. The Civil War Trust (a division of the American Battlefield Trust) and its partners have acquired and preserved 885 acres (3.58 km^{2}) of the battlefield in five transactions since 1996.

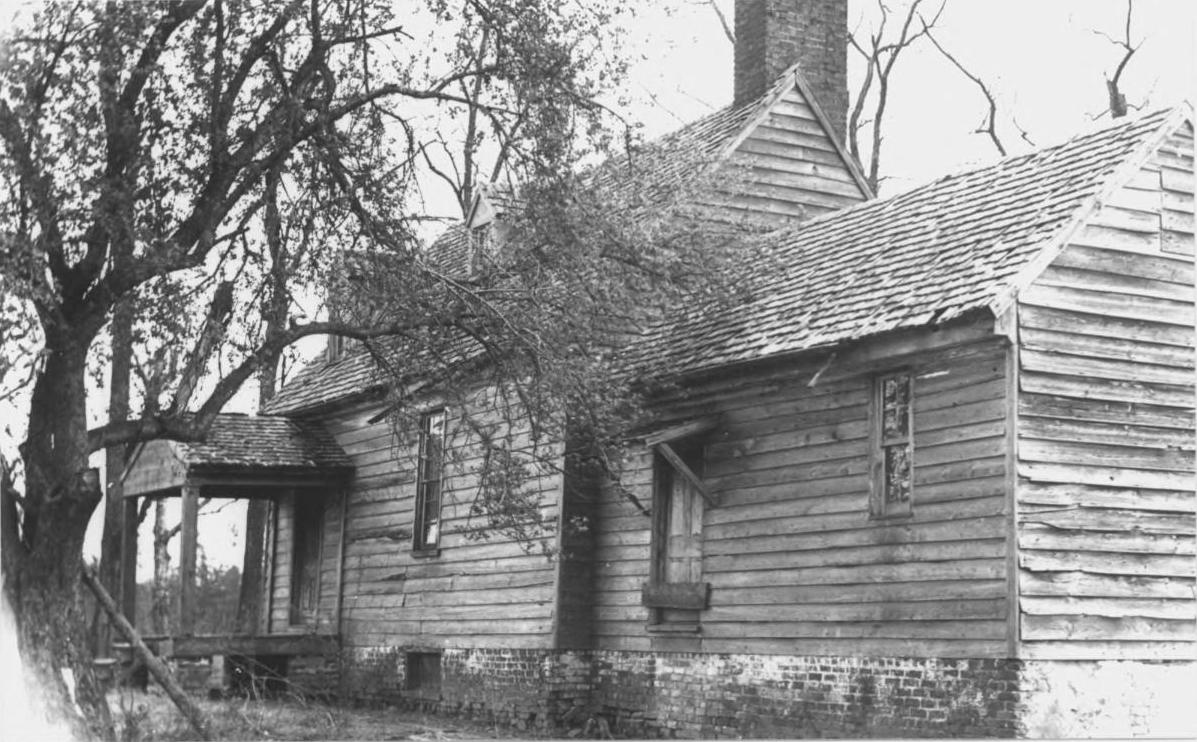
Hillsman House, at Sayler's Creek Battlefield, in 1936, before house was restored

The battle was composed of three separate engagements, which may be termed the Battle of Hillsman's Farm, the Battle of Marshall's Cross Roads (or Battle of Harper's Farm), and the Battle of Lockett's Farm (or Battle of Double Bridges). The Hillsman House, which was owned by Capt. James Hillsman, served as a hospital for both Confederate and Union troops. Bloodstains still remain on the floor from when it served as a hospital after the battles. The Lockett house is in its original state. The Christian house is also there.

The park is located on Virginia routes 617, 618, and 619 between Farmville and Burkeville, in Amelia and Prince Edward counties. From 1865 to the area's nomination for the National Register of Historic Places in 1984, the area saw little development, and remained much as it was during the battles. It was declared a National Historic Landmark in 1985.

Areas in the National Historic Landmark site include four portions, of 800 acres (3.2 km^{2}), 215 acres (0.87 km^{2}), 5 acres (20,000 m^{2}), and 0.6 acres (2,400 m^{2}). These are indicated on topographical maps included in the version of the NRHP documents provided by the Virginia Department of Historic Resources. The current state park covers only 321 acres (1.30 km^{2}).

Costumed interpreters station the park throughout the year. Living history performers are active in the park during the anniversary of the battle every April.

The land was originally named in the 18th century for a farmer named Saylor. During the Civil War, the name was changed to Sayler. Some official records called it Sailor, the spelling that the Commonwealth of Virginia uses in its name for the related park.

== See also ==
- List of National Historic Landmarks in Virginia
- National Register of Historic Places listings in Amelia County, Virginia
- National Register of Historic Places listings in Prince Edward County, Virginia
