= Rice, Virginia =

Unincorporated community in Virginia, United States

Rice
- Unincorporated community
- Location within the Commonwealth of Virginia Rice (the United States)
- Coordinates: 37°16′31″N 78°17′29″W
- Country: United States
- State: Virginia
- County: Prince Edward

Population (2010 United States census)
  - Total: 2,256
- Time zone: UTC−5 (Eastern (EST))
  - Summer (DST): UTC−4 (EDT)
- ZIP Codes: 23966

Rice is an unincorporated community in Prince Edward County, Virginia, United States. Rice has a U.S. Post Office with the ZIP Code 23966. The nearest town to Rice is Farmville. During the Civil War era, it was known as Rice's Depot.

== Demographics ==
As of 2010, Rice's population was 2,256 people. Since 2000, it has had a population growth of 9.51 percent.

The median home cost in Rice is $164,640. Home appreciation the last year has been -4.00 percent.

Compared to the rest of the country, Rice's cost of living is 4.90% Lower than the U.S. average.

Prince Edward County has one elementary school, one middle-school and one high school all located in Farmville, and school buses are used throughout the county including in Rice. Prince Edward County's public schools spend $5,458 per student. The average school expenditure in the U.S. is $5,678.

The unemployment rate in Rice is 8.10 percent (U.S. avg. is 10.20%). Recent job growth is negative. Rice jobs have decreased by 1.96 percent.

== History ==
This town was a stop on the Southside Railroad in the mid-nineteenth century. This became the Atlantic, Mississippi and Ohio Railroad in 1870 and then a line in the Norfolk and Western Railway.

Site of the Battle of Rice's Station, a minor engagement in the Appomattox Campaign of the American Civil War that was the immediate prelude to the Battle of Sayler's Creek. On the evening of April 6, 1865, General Robert E. Lee waited with General James Longstreet's Corps in Rice's Depot for the rest of the army to come up. Hearing heavy firing to the east, General Lee investigated the situation, taking General William Mahone's division with him. Lee rode about two miles back along the Rice-Deatonville Road to a high knoll above Big Sailor's Creek where he saw "teamsters without wagons, soldiers without rifles, and shattered regiments without officers" fleeing across the creek and up the hill.

He was reported to have said, "My God, has the army been dissolved?"

One of the men answered, "No, General, here are troops ready to do their duty." Nonetheless, Lee lost a fifth of his remaining army at the battle of Sailor's Creek. The Army of Northern Virginia surrendered three days later, ending the Appomattox Campaign and removing one of the Confederacy's most prominent armies and commanders from the field.

Rice is on the High Bridge Trail State Park, on the former path of the Southside Railroad, and has a large parking lot for access to the Trail.

== Notable person ==
- Lieutenant General Samuel V. Wilson, "General Sam," 5th Director of the Defense Intelligence Agency and 22nd President of Hampden–Sydney College; credited for helping to create Delta Force
