= Detachment R =

Detachment R (also known as the U.S. Army Russian Area School) was a special U.S. Army School initially located in a former Wehrmacht garrison in Oberammergau and later moved to Regensburg, Germany, where it remained from 1950 to 1954, when it was moved back to Oberammergau and finally to Sheridan Barracks in Garmisch-Partenkirchen in 1964.

It was redesignated as the U.S. Army Institute for Advanced Russian and East European Studies in 1967 and officially named the U.S. Army Russian Institute in October 1978 under the U.S. Army Intelligence and Security Command. Following the collapse of the Soviet Union, USARI closed in 1993.

The school operated as the two-year final component of the Army's Foreign Area Specialist Training (FAST) Program in Russian and was designed as a full-immersion experience in the language, economics, and culture of the Soviet Union. The first component of the FAST program involved a one-year Russian course at the Army Language School in Monterey, California, and was followed by a year at Columbia University studying Russian history, economics, political science, and other topics of strategic importance.

Detachment R was described at length by Peter Bridges, former U.S. ambassador to Somalia, in his 2000 book, Safirka: An American Envoy:

What we were being taught at Oberammergau was to perfect ourselves in the Russian language, to comprehend the intricacies and absurdities of the Soviet economic system, and to master the Soviet geographic, ethnographic, and climatic map; we were also taught a lot about the Soviet military and police system. (p. 28)

Bridges goes on to describe the structure of the program, its leadership, and its faculty:

The detachment commandant was an American colonel, his deputy was a major, and there were several staff noncoms. We students numbered less than fifty, mostly army officers spending two years at Detachment R after a year of Russian-language study and a year in the Russian Institute at Columbia University, where I had done my own graduate work. Most of the army officers would go on from Oberammergau to become military attaches at Moscow or to join the American liaison mission with the Group of Soviet Forces in East Germany. (p. 27) They taught in Russian, and they were Russian, except for a pleasant gentleman named Ozolins, who had been a Latvian diplomat until Stalin occupied his country, and Chechen writer named Avtorkhanov, who had been a Soviet professor--and both of these spoke perfect Russian. As for the Russians, they ran the gamut from two former KGB officers who had defected to the West to an ethnic Russian who had lived in Poland until World War II and a former Soviet economist who had skipped from East to West Berlin before the Wall was built. (p. 27, emphasis in original)
