= Battle of Sailor's Creek =

1865 battle of the American Civil War

- Part of the American Civil War
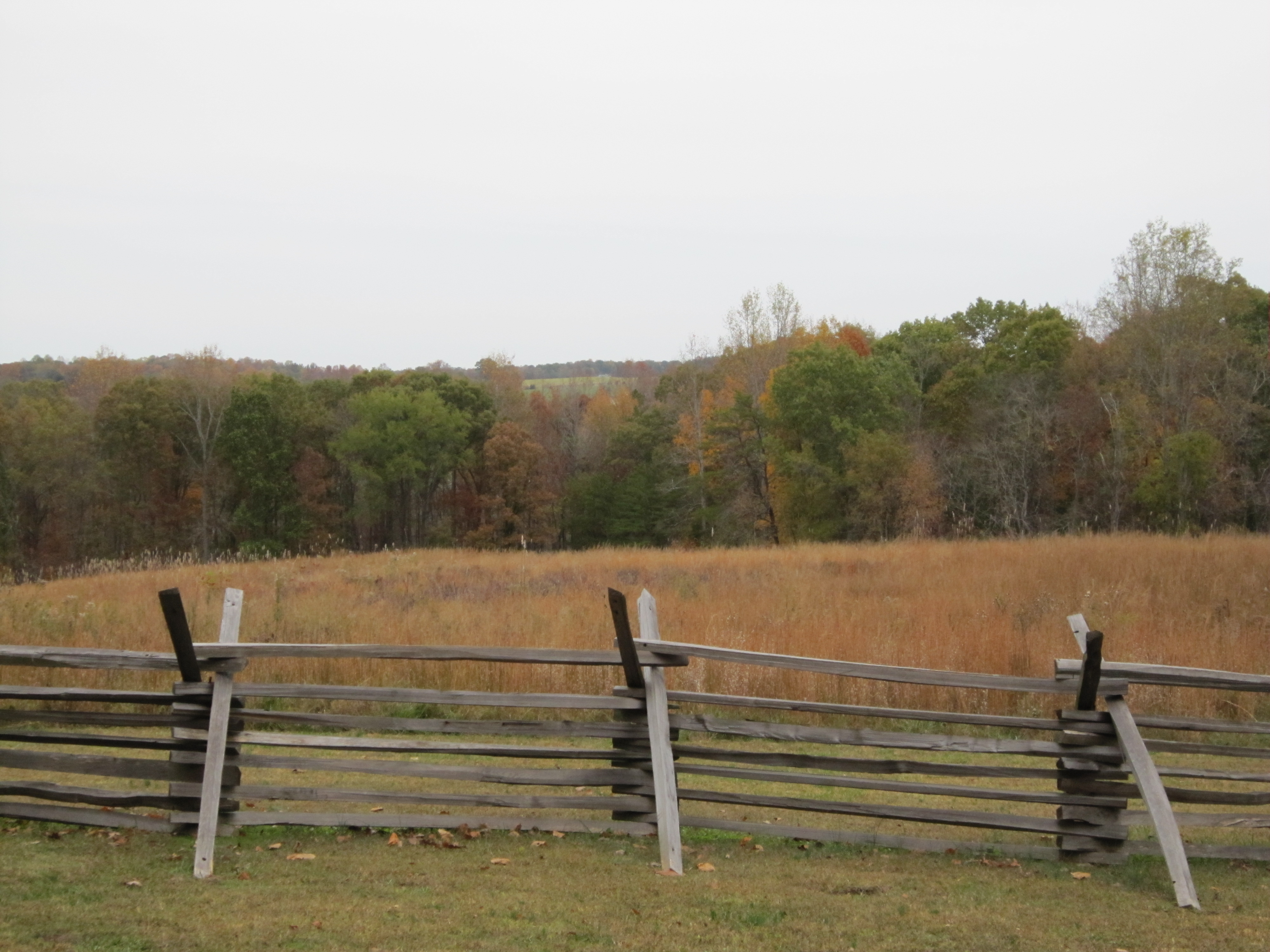
- A view of the battlefield as it appeared in 2010
Date	April 6, 1865 (161 years ago)
Location	Amelia, Prince Edward, and Nottoway counties, Virginia 37.30551°N 78.22797°W
Result	Union victory

Belligerents
United States (Union)	Confederate States

Commanders and leaders
(United States) Philip H. Sheridan	(Confederate States of America) Richard S. Ewell (POW)

Units involved
Army of the Potomac; Army of the James; Army of the Shenandoah	Army of Northern Virginia; Confederate States Navy; Confederate States Marine Corps

Strength
25,000–26,000 (Note: Salmon, 2001, p. 479. The estimate is based on 7,000 infantry present from the VI Corps divisions of Frank Wheaton and Truman Seymour; George W. Getty's division was not on the field during the VI Corps fight against Richard S. Ewell, Calkins, 1997, p. 108. Wesley Merritt had 8,000–9,000 cavalrymen in three divisions against Richard H. Anderson. The two divisions of Philippe Régis de Trobriand and Nelson A. Miles fought the main action against John B. Gordon. Salmon did not give a figure for the II Corps in the action against Gordon. According to Humphreys, 1883, p. 381, Francis Barlow's division (taking over from William Hays) was not engaged due to the receipt of erroneous information. Marvel, 2002, p. 83 refers to upwards of 10,000 Union infantry (Humphreys's men, before Wright's men arrived). The CWSAC Report update cites Union strength at 36,500. To get to that number, the men of Getty's division (not engaged) and Barlow's division (not on the field) would need to be included.)	18,500 (Note: Salmon, p. 480. The estimate is based on 5,200 men in the corps of Richard S. Ewell, 6,300 under Richard H. Anderson, and 7,000 under John B. Gordon. The CWSAC Report update states Confederate strength at 16,900 men.)

Casualties and losses
1,148	7,700
- Location in Virginia

The Battle of Sailor's Creek, also known as the Battle of Sayler's Creek, was fought on April 6, 1865, near Farmville, Virginia, as part of the Appomattox Campaign, near the end of the American Civil War. It was the last major engagement between the Confederate Army of Northern Virginia, commanded by General Robert E. Lee, and the Army of the Potomac, under the overall direction of Union General-in-Chief Lieutenant General Ulysses S. Grant.

After abandoning Petersburg, the exhausted and starving Confederates headed west, hoping to re-supply at Danville or Lynchburg, before joining General Joseph E. Johnston in North Carolina. But the stronger Union army kept pace with them, exploiting the rough terrain full of creeks and high bluffs, where the Confederates' long wagon trains were highly vulnerable. The two small bridges over Sailor's Creek and Little Sailor's Creek caused a bottleneck that further delayed the Confederates' attempt to escape. After some desperate hand-to-hand fighting, about a quarter of the remaining effective soldiers of the Confederate force were lost, including several generals. Witnessing the surrender from a nearby bluff, Lee made his famous despairing remark to Major General William Mahone, "My God, has the army dissolved?", to which Mahone replied, "No, General, here are troops ready to do their duty."

== Etymology ==
The current official name for the tributary of the Appomattox River is Sayler's Creek, as established in 1959 by the United States Board on Geographic Names; this spelling is used on topographic maps issued by the U.S. Geological Survey. Many prominent Civil War historians (James M. McPherson, Shelby Foote, Bruce Catton, Douglas Southall Freeman, etc.) have used this spelling. Chris M. Calkins of the National Park Service used this spelling in his 1980 work, Thirty-Six Hours Before Appomattox, and also in the nomination he wrote to preserve the battlefield in the National Register of Historic Places inventory. However, Calkins noted in his 1997 work, The Appomattox Campaign, that at the time of the Civil War and previously, maps used the spelling Sailors. These include the 1752 Joshua Fry–Peter Jefferson map of Virginia and the 1867 Michler survey maps of 1867 (included in the Official Records Atlas). He therefore judges that the correct name for the Civil War battle should be Sailor's Creek. The American Battlefield Protection Program (National Park Service Civil War Sites Advisory Commission), the Civil War Trust, and the Virginia Department of Conservation and Recreation use the spelling "Sailor's Creek". The battle is also known variously as Little Sailor's Creek, Harper's Farm, Marshall's Cross Roads, Hillsman Farm, Double Bridges, or Lockett's Farm.

== Background ==
=== Military situation ===
The Appomattox Campaign before the Battle of Sailor's Creek showed the increasingly desperate circumstances of the Rebel forces leading into the battle. Lieutenant General Ulysses S. Grant's Union Army (Army of the Potomac, Army of the James, Army of the Shenandoah) broke the Confederate Army defenses of Petersburg, Virginia at the Battle of Five Forks on April 1 and the Third Battle of Petersburg on April 2. A Union division under the command of Brigadier General Nelson A. Miles also broke up the last defense of the South Side Railroad on the afternoon of April 2, cutting off that railroad as a supply line or route of retreat for the Confederates. General Robert E. Lee's Army of Northern Virginia evacuated Petersburg and the Confederate capital of Richmond on the night of April 2–3 and began a retreat in hopes of linking up with General Joseph E. Johnston's army confronting the Union army group commanded by General William Tecumseh Sherman in North Carolina.

=== Battle of Namozine Church ===
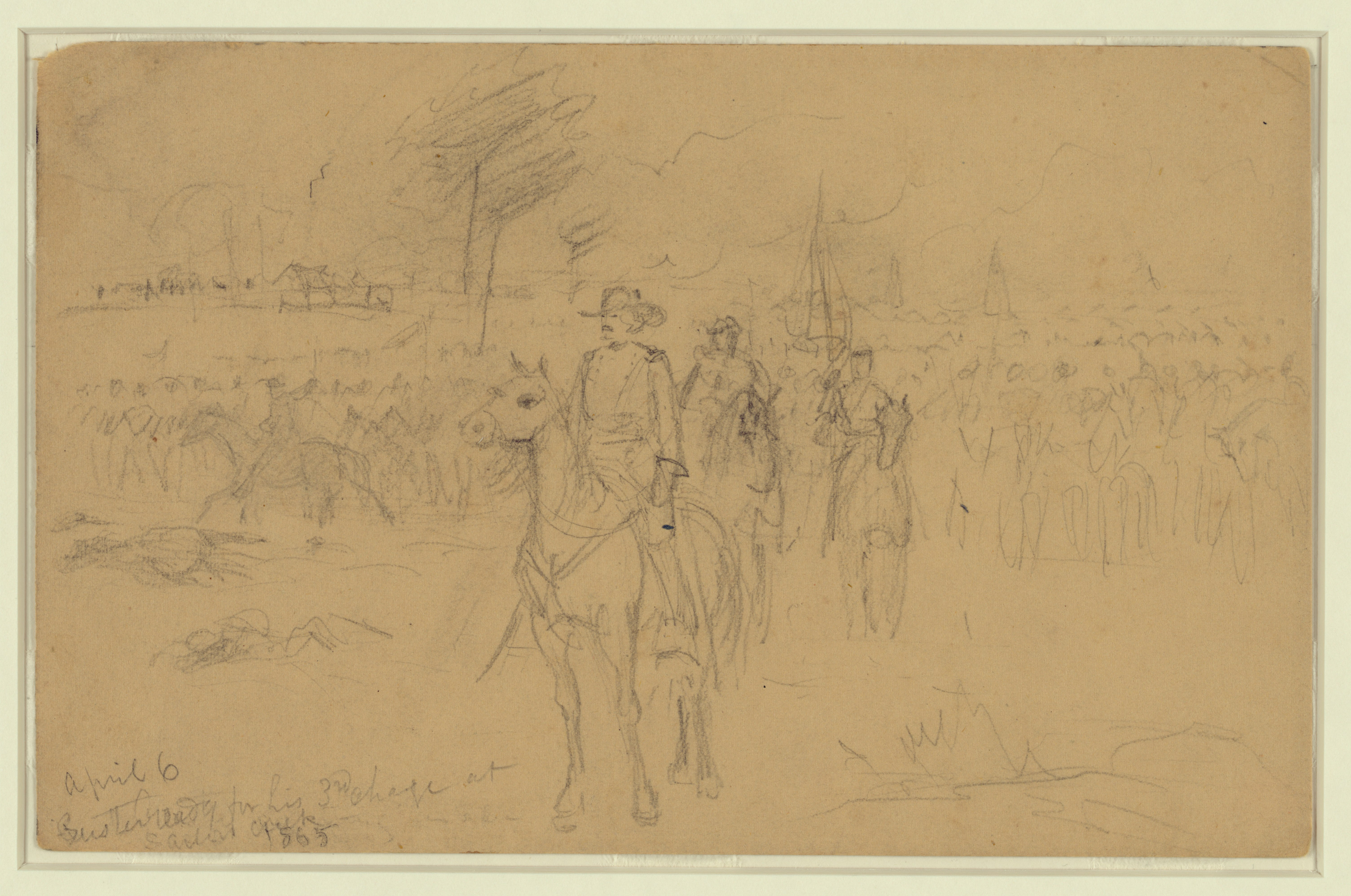
Custer ready for his 3rd charge at Sailors Creek by Alfred Waud

Most of Lee's army marched west on roads north of the Appomattox River. On April 3, south of the Appomattox River, Union Army cavalry under Colonel (Brevet Brigadier General) William Wells' brigade of Brigadier General (Brevet Major General) George Armstrong Custer's division pursued and engaged units of the fleeing Confederate cavalry rear guard under Brigadier General William Paul Roberts at Namozine Creek and Brigadier General Rufus Barringer of W.H.F. Lee's division and the overall command of Major General Fitzhugh Lee at the Battle of Namozine Church. Barringer's Confederate cavalry had bought enough time for Major General Bushrod Johnson's infantry division to pass nearby Namozine Church. When Johnson approached Namozine Church with his infantry division, Custer's men were forced to retire, allowing the Confederate forces to proceed across Deep Creek, an Appomattox River tributary. After dark, however, Wells's brigade continued to attack Fitzhugh Lee's force along Deep Creek but were finally held off by Bushrod Johnson's infantry at Sweathouse Creek. Brigadier General Barringer and many of his men were captured when Major General Philip Sheridan's scouts who were wearing gray uniforms led Barringer and his remaining men into a trap. The number of Confederate killed and wounded are unknown except that Bushrod Johnson reported 15 wounded. 350 Confederates were captured. The Union lost 95 killed and wounded at Namozine Creek, Namozine Church and Sweathouse Creek on April 3.

=== March toward Amelia Court House ===
Most of the Confederate Army had marched about 21 miles (34 km) west on April 3. In order to meet at the rendezvous point of Amelia Court House that had been designated by General Lee, all of the Confederate commands except those of Lieutenant General Richard H. Anderson and Major General Fitzhugh Lee would have to cross the Appomattox River, which turns sharply to the north not far west of the Confederate camps on the night of April 3. On April 4, most of the Confederate army moving over to the south side of the Appomattox River had to use a single muddy road or take widely circuitous routes due to flooding and bridges being out on other roads, slowing progress toward the rendezvous point of Amelia Court House.

By the evening of April 3, most of Lieutenant General James Longstreet's troops had crossed to the west side of the Appomattox River over Goode's Bridge while Major General John B. Gordon's corps was east of the bridge. Amelia Court House was 8.5 miles (13.7 km) to the west. Ewell's force could not cross the river at the Genito Bridge as planned because a necessary pontoon bridge expected to be there had not arrived. After marching south, Ewell's men crossed the river on a Richmond and Danville Railroad bridge over which they had placed planks. They camped on April 4 about 1 mile (1.6 km) west of the bridge. Gordon's corps was at Scott's Shop 5 miles (8.0 km) east of Amelia Court House, waiting for Ewell's column to catch up. Mahone's men marched to Goode's Bridge but did not go into Amelia Court House until he was told that the force from Richmond had arrived.

=== Beaver Pond Creek ===
On the line of march west toward the Confederate Army's rendezvous point of Amelia Court House on Bevill's Bridge Road, Lieutenant General Anderson had the remaining men of Major Generals George Pickett and Bushrod Johnson's divisions build earthworks and form a line of battle at Tabernacle Church Road to protect the forces in retreat from attack from the pursuing Union forces to their south.

On April 4, Custer's cavalry division rode west toward Jetersville, Virginia on the Richmond and Danville Railroad, 8 miles (13 km) southwest of Amelia Court House and 10 miles (16 km) of Burkeville Junction, Virginia. Brigadier General (Brevet Major General) Wesley Merritt with Brigadier General Thomas Devin's cavalry division crossed Deep Creek at Brown's Bridge and headed straight past Tabernacle Church to Beaver Pond Creek where late in the day, a Michigan regiment from the division sent Anderson's skirmishers back to their field works. Coming up toward the works, Devin's entire division, mostly dismounted, skirmished with portions of Major Generals Henry Heth's, Bushrod Johnson's and George Pickett's infantry. About 10:00 p.m., Devin was ordered to pull back to Jetersville and he led his men to that point after burning a nearby mill.

=== Amelia Court House ===
On the morning of April 4, Union Brigadier General Ranald Mackenzie's command crossed Deep Creek and reached the Five Forks of Amelia County, only about 1 mile (1.6 km) south of Amelia Court House, where the 1st Maryland Cavalry (U.S.) skirmished with the 14th Virginia Cavalry.

An advance party of Union Major General George Crook's cavalry division reached the important rail intersection of Burkeville Junction by 3:00 p.m., blocking the Richmond and Danville Railroad route to the southwest. The main body of Crook's cavalry division and Brigadier General Joshua Chamberlain's infantry brigade from the V Corps also headed toward Jetersville, arriving before dark. A few hours later, the rest of the V Corps arrived at Jetersville and started to entrench, even extending the trenches across the railroad tracks. The arrival of the entire V Corps at Jetersville ended Lee's last chance to move south along the railroad, though if he had chosen to send Longstreet's corps which had arrived first at Amelia Court House south against the gathering Union force, his trailing divisions probably could not have caught up. Lieutenant General Richard Ewell's corp was still trying to cross the Appomattox River at 10:00 p.m.; Anderson was still skirmishing with Devin at Beaver Pond Creek; Gordon was several miles behind at Scott's Shop; and, Mahone was not far from Goode's Bridge, waiting to protect the bridge in case Ewell could find no other river crossing. When Devin's cavalry broke off the engagement at Beaver Pond Creek, no Union force threatened the rear of Lee's army and Anderson's and Mahone's forces did not need to lag behind as rear guards. They did not arrive at Amelia Court House until well into the next day.

Lee had expected to find rations for the army at Amelia Court House but found only an inadequate stockpile of rations and a trainload of ordnance. Lee waited for the rest of the army to catch up and sent foraging parties into the county which yielded few provisions despite Lee's personal appeal in a proclamation that day. Yet Union Army foragers were able to find abundant provisions on the march as their wagons began to fall far behind on the muddy roads. Lee also ordered 200,000 rations to be sent from Danville via the railroad. Sheridan intercepted this message at Jetersville later that day. Lee also ordered that the number of wagons and artillery pieces with the army be reduced and precede the infantry on the march with the best horses. The extra equipment was to be sent by a circuitous route to the north with the weaker animals, sent by rail or destroyed. The 200 guns and 1,000 wagons that Lee's army had taken on their flight would be reduced by almost one-third.

A week later, Lee said the delay at Amelia Court House assured the Confederate defeat and surrender. Some modern historians have emphasized the failure to have an expected pontoon bridge at the Genito Road crossing was the key factor in keeping Lee's trailing divisions from reaching Amelia Court House on April 4. A pontoon bridge had been placed at Goode's Bridge but traffic there became heavily congested because the approaches to Bevill's Bridge also were blocked by high water. Lee did not mention the missing pontoon bridge in his remarks a week later but instead blamed the delay entirely on the lack of supplies at Amelia Court House, but as some historians have pointed out, many of his men and wagons had not arrived at Amelia Court House on April 4 and were not in a position to advance until some time on April 5 even if he had not stopped the others to rest and forage. Historian William Marvel wrote that "as badly as Lee needed to keep moving that night, he needed even more to concentrate his forces."

=== Paineville, Amelia Springs ===
On the morning of April 5, Sheridan sent Brigadier General Henry Eugene Davies' brigade of Major General George Crook's division to scout for Rebel movements beyond Amelia Court House near Paineville, or Paine's Cross Roads, about 5 miles (8.0 km) north of Amelia Springs. At Paineville, Davies found a headquarters wagon train guarded by Brigadier General Martin Gary's cavalry brigade. This was the wagon train that had left Richmond with provisions for Lee's army, including food and ammunition for Ewell's corps. Since it had followed a more circuitous route north of Genito Bridge on Paineville Road, it had only some cavalry escort. The train crossed to the south side of the Appomattox River by the Clemmentown Bridge.

As Davies's brigade slowly passed the resort at Amelia Springs, the wagon train with excess artillery and equipment started up the Paineville Road from Amelia Court House toward Paineville at the same time as the wagon train from Richmond headed south on that road toward Paineville. Local citizens began to spread out on horseback to warn the Confederates of the Union cavalry incursion.

Davies attacked the lead section of the wagon train, two companies of artillery, 4 miles (6.4 km) east of Paineville, and quickly rounded up 300 soldiers and as many African-American teamsters. The Union cavalrymen cut many horses and mules out of their traces, captured five new Armstrong guns and burned more than 100 wagons of provisions. Davies's troopers destroyed Major General George Washington Custis Lee's supplies including all the spare ammunition. Leading wagons from the train which left Amelia Court House, including Fitzhugh Lee's headquarters baggage, Robert E. Lee's headquarters wagons with many reports and some ambulances and medical supplies, also were caught by the Union raiders. Stragglers and sick soldiers finally gathered to stop the destruction.

Before Davies could return to Jetersville, his brigade was attacked near Amelia Springs by Martin Gary's cavalry brigade and a much larger force of Thomas L. Rosser's and Colonel Thomas T. Munford's divisions under Major General Fitzhugh Lee. Davies's force was driven back across Flat Creek. Acting as a rear guard, the 1st New Jersey Volunteer Cavalry Regiment held off the Confederate pursuers, allowing Davies's main column with prisoners and captured horses, mules and artillery to move past Amelia Springs. At Amelia Springs, the other brigades of Crook's division under Brigadier General John Irvin Gregg and Colonel (Brevet Brigadier General) Charles H. Smith provided reinforcements, allowing Davies's force to reach Jetersville with their prisoners, guns and teams. Davies returned with his men to Amelia Springs to help defend against the Confederate cavalry attack.

Crook's cavalry division had casualties of 13 killed, 81 wounded and 72 missing and probably taken prisoner in three encounters during the day. Fitzhugh Lee said he counted 30 dead Union soldiers along the way. (Note: Calkins, p. 88 gives the Union casualties as 30 killed and 150 wounded but gives the lower number in the text in his appendix on page 202.) Davies captured 320 Confederate soldiers and 310 African-Americans whom he described as teamsters. He also captured 400 animals and 11 flags while destroying about 200 wagons. Confederate casualties were unreported but two Confederate captains are known to have been mortally wounded.

=== Jetersville ===
Having not been able to find much food in the Amelia Court House area and with the Union Army closing in, Lee started his army marching down the route of the Richmond and Danville Railroad toward Jetersville, Virginia at 1:00 p.m. on April 5.

Nearing Jetersville and hearing skirmish fire in front, Lee discovered that his route to Danville along the railroad was blocked at Jetersville by the fast-moving Union cavalry under Major General Philip Sheridan. Union infantry was reported by cavalry scouts to be nearby but in fact the V Corps had already reached Jetersville.

Lee decided his men were too spread out and it was too late in the day to attack the Union force at Jetersville, so the Confederates would have to march back up the Richmond and Danville Railroad to a road upon which to make another night march to Farmville. At Farmville, 23 miles (37 km) west on the South Side Railroad, Confederate Commissary General Isaac St. John told General Lee that he would have 80,000 rations waiting. From Farmville, Lee might be able to reach the Richmond and Danville at Keysville, Virginia if the Confederates could outpace the Union forces.

The Confederate march was held up before the troops could reach Amelia Springs because a bridge was out at Flat Creek which needed to be repaired to allow the passage of wagons and artillery. During the night, Union spies dressed in Confederate uniforms were captured with a message that showed the disposition of the Union forces.

=== Union plan ===
Lieutenant General Grant reached Major General Sheridan's headquarters at Jetersville about 10:30 p.m. Near midnight, Grant and Sheridan met with the ill Major General George Meade, commander of the Army of the Potomac. Grant said he had no doubt Lee was moving right then, but he did not order Meade to change his plan. Sheridan also was convinced that Lee would not remain static at Amelia Court House. Despite their skepticism about Lee staying at Amelia Court House, Grant directed him to advance early in the morning on Amelia Court House if Meade persisted in his view that that was the appropriate move. By this time, the II Corps, V Corps and VI Corps of the Army of the Potomac were available at Jetersville to move against the Confederate army. The soldiers of Meade's three corps were given coffee at 4:00 a.m. and were told to be ready to move at daybreak.

In the morning, Humphreys discovered everyone asleep at William Hays's Second Division headquarters at 6:00 a.m., when their march was scheduled to begin, he replaced Hays as division commander with Brigadier General (Brevet Major General) Francis Barlow, who had just reported for duty. Barlow's division did not become engaged at Sailor's Creek because, based on erroneous information about a Confederate column, that division was ordered to move too far to the right.

== Initial movements ==
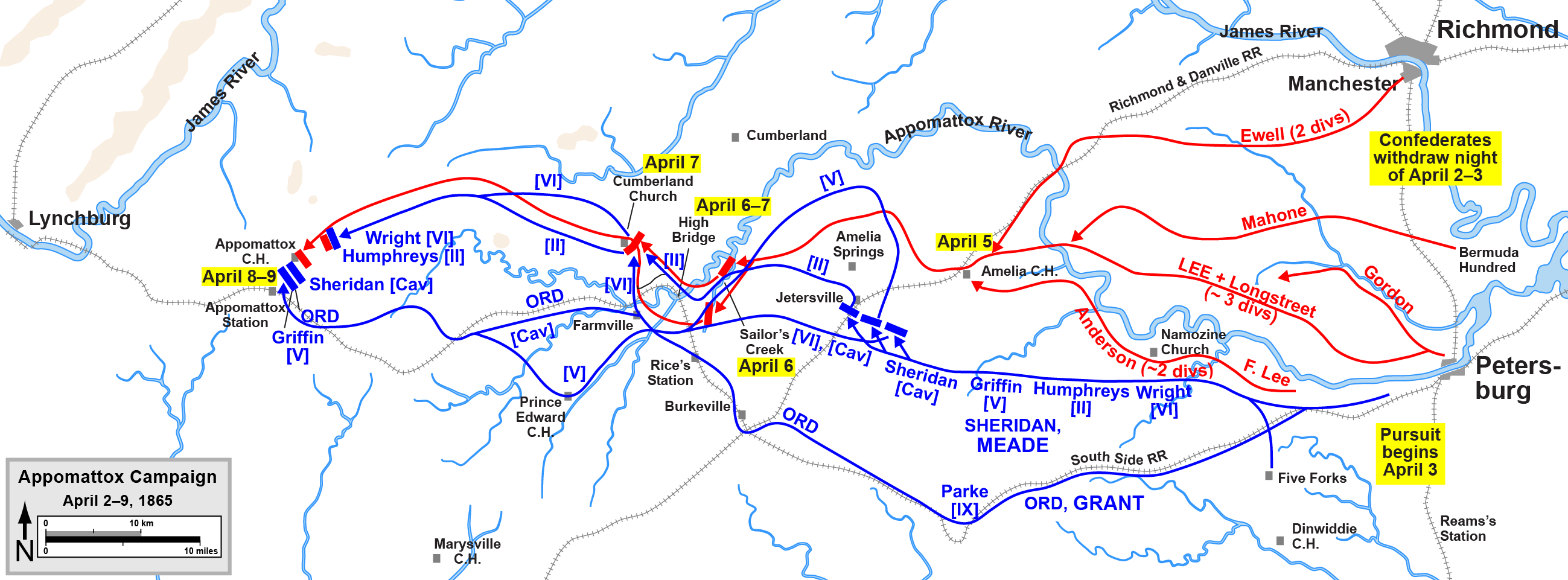
Lee's retreat and Grant's pursuit in the Appomattox Campaign, April 2–9, 1865

=== March and pursuit ===
The Confederate movements west from Amelia Springs put the Rebels into precarious positions as their long columns became both spread out and eventually delayed as they reached choke points at bridges over Sailor's Creek and Little Sailor's Creek and high bluffs which needed to be traversed west of the creeks.

Lee had his army in motion on the night of April 5–6. Longstreet's combined First and Third Corps led the Confederate night march west, followed by two divisions commanded by Richard Anderson, Richard Ewell's Reserve corps (Richmond garrison troops), the main wagon train, and John Gordon's Second Corps. Longstreet's route of march took his men to Amelia Springs, then on the road to Deatonville on their way to Rice's Station on the South Side Railroad.

Lee's corps moved on parallel roads from Amelia Court House but after they reached Deatonville, all the men and wagons would have to use a single road to move directly to Rice's Station, increasing their vulnerability while on the march. The only other route was the Jamestown Road which left Deatonville to the north and only reached Rice's Station over a roundabout loop.

Longstreet's corps left Amelia Court House first and arrived at Rice's Station starting about sunrise. Later in the morning, General Lee joined him. They planned to wait at Rice's Station for the rest of the army to catch up and to guard the town's South Side Railroad station from attack by the Union XXIV Corps, which already had occupied Burkeville Junction. At daybreak, Fitzhugh Lee's cavalry left Amelia Springs and marched to Rice's Station where they joined with Longstreet's command.

Major General William Mahone's division, of the former Third Corps, now combined with Longstreet's First Corps, reached Deatonville before dawn on April 6. Mahone's men marched toward Rice's Station over the right-hand fork at Deatonville. They would move unhindered to Rice's Station but the following infantry corps would not.

Anderson's, Ewell's and Gordon's corps followed in line after Mahone's division. Rooney Lee's cavalry division stayed behind when Fitzhugh Lee left with the other cavalry so that Rooney Lee's division could help Gordon's corps as a rear guard. The last of Gordon's soldiers had not reached Amelia Springs when the leading men of Longstreet's corps reached Rice's Station.

The wagon trains were on the right flank of the soldiers of Lee's army, heading for a crossing of Sailor's Creek at Perkinson's mill, near the Creek's confluence with the Appomattox River. The troops planned to cross the river about 2 miles (3.2 km) higher up on the road to Rice's Station. Ewell's corps did not leave Amelia Springs until 2:00 p.m. in order to guard the wagons but moved ahead of them and close up with Anderson's corps when they did move out.

On the route of march about 1 mile (1.6 km) past Deatonville, the road to Rice's Station declined into a marsh in the area of Sandy Creek. Holt's Corner, where some fighting took place, was two miles down the road. (Note: This was some times referred to as Hott's Corner but it was named after a local resident named John Holt. Trudeau, 1994, p. 107.) Another 1.25 miles (2.01 km) farther, past the Hillsman House, was Sailor's Creek. On the opposite side of Sailor's Creek was a steep bluff. About 0.5 miles (0.80 km) past the bluff was another junction near James N. Marshall's farm. Deep ravines were cut into the terrain by both branches of Sailor's Creek. General Humphreys described the country as "broken, consisting of woods with dense undergrowth and swamps, alternating with open fields."

Sheridan did not send the cavalry with Meade's infantry because of his conviction that Lee must have been moving west to try to outrun the Union Army. Sheridan directed his cavalry to follow a road parallel and to the south of Lee's line of march to try to intercept the Confederates. Sheridan sent the cavalry west on the Deatonville-Rice's Station Road with Crook's division leading the advance and Merritt's two divisions under Devin and Custer following behind instead of sending them toward Amelia Court House with the infantry.

== Battle ==
External video
- Chris Calkins on the Battles of Sailor's Creek, March 14, 2015, C-SPAN

As it developed, the Battle of Sailor's Creek was actually three principal engagements fought in close proximity mostly at about the same time. Major General Horatio Wright's VI Corps battled Lieutenant General Richard S. Ewell's corps at the Hillsman House. Union cavalry led by Brigadier General (Brevet Major General) Wesley Merritt fought Lieutenant General Richard Anderson's corps at Marshall's Crossroads. After a running battle over several miles, Major General Andrew A. Humphreys's II Corps engaged Major General John B. Gordon's corps at Lockett's Farm. (Note: General Humphreys titled a subsection in his book: The Battles of Sailor's Creek. Humphreys, 1883, p. 381.)

=== Humphreys v. Gordon: Battle of Lockett's Farm ===
On the rainy morning of April 6, Humphreys's corp initially moved toward the Confederate wagon train near Amelia Springs on the road to Amelia Court House. At Amelia Springs, Brigadier General (Brevet Major General) Gershom Mott was wounded while reconnoitering with the skirmish line and was replaced as division commander by Brigadier General Philippe Régis de Trobriand. Units of the II Corps moving toward Amelia Court House in accordance with Meade's order, which was in the opposite direction of the Confederate march, observed Lee's army moving west just before the rear guard passed out of sight. At about the same time, Union signal officers discovered wagon trains and infantry moving toward Deatonville while Brigadier General (Brevet Major General) Charles Griffin's V Corps, at Hill's Shop, also learned that Lee's force had left Amelia Court House. (Note: Meade had been wrong in expecting Lee to still be at Amelia Court House. Sheridan had been correct that Lee would be on the move.) As the westward movement of the Confederate Army became apparent, the II Corps changed direction and gave pursuit. Griffin's V Corps was sent on a wide swing to the north of the Confederate column through Paineville and was beyond the action on April 6.

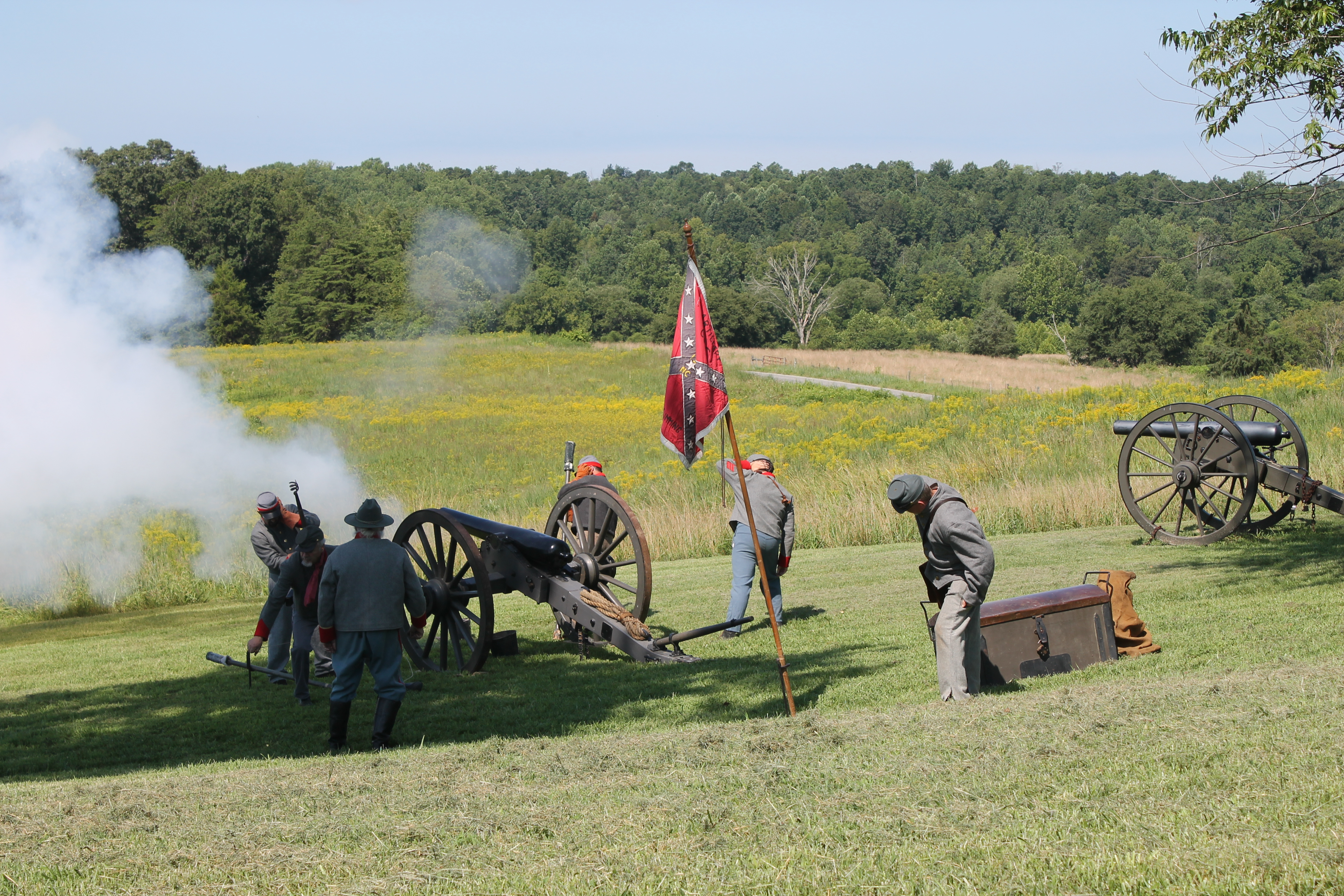
Reenactors engage in a recreation of the battle, 2013

Miles's division of Humphrey's corps brought some guns to the bank of Flat Creek, which ran from northeast to southwest across the line of march, and opened fire on the Confederate infantry, which was the rear of Gordon's corps, marching away toward the west. A running battle began at about 9:00 a.m. between Miles's and De Trobriand's divisions of the II Corps and the much smaller divisions of Brigadier General James A. Walker's and Major General Bryan Grimes from Gordon's Second Corps, with Rooney Lee's cavalry occasionally holding the line for the infantry.

Gordon's running battle with Humphreys was stopped by the slow-moving wagon train at Deatonville, making it necessary for his corps to make a stand. Crook had sent a cavalry brigade to help the II Corps fight Gordon at Deatonville, but Gordon's infantry and Rooney Lee's cavalry drove them off.

Regis DeTrobriand's division met Confederate Brigadier General James A. Walker's division and after a brief artillery duel, watched the survivors run up hill and defend themselves from the crest. Seven Union regiments charged Walker's position in an effort to silence his artillery, taking many casualties. The 17th Maine Infantry Regiment under Major Charlie Mattocks led a charge against the 21st North Carolina Infantry Regiment, taking their flag and about 300 prisoners. DeTrobriand's other regiments picked up another 100 prisoners, flags and wagons as they also took the hill and, when they did, they sent some shells in the direction of the retreating Confederates. DeTrobriand's division occupied Deatonville, finding many arms and artillery pieces and much ammunition left behind by the Confederates.

After Lieutenant General Ewell diverted the wagon trains to the Jamestown Road to the north, Major General Gordon's corps followed them, covering the wagons as the Union II Corps continued to pursue close behind. After some fighting at the Holt's Corner junction of the two roads, Humphreys's and Gordon's corps continued to fight over another 3 miles (4.8 km).

The double bridges over Little Sailor's Creek and Big Sailor's Creek just before they merged were broken down, stranding hundreds of wagons and blocking Gordon's line of march. The II Corps came on quickly and after some resistance, Gordon's corps fell back. Fighting stopped at dark and many of Gordon's men escaped, some reaching High Bridge with Gordon that night. Gordon reported that his disorganized men marched the entire night and that "many threw their guns away."

Overall the II Corps captured 13 flags, 4 guns and 1,700 prisoners. Humphreys wrote that his corps suffered 311 killed and wounded and that the Confederate losses probably exceeded his corps' loss.

=== Crook, Merritt v. Anderson: Battle of Marshall's Crossroads ===
Major General George Crook's cavalry division, initially moving on the Pride's Church Road, starting near Deatonville, began hit-and-run tactics against the Confederate wagon train and supporting infantry. After Crook's detached brigade was driven away from the fight with Gordon's corps at Deatonville, it jumped ahead to Holt's Corner, where Crook's lead brigade attacked Lieutenant General Richard Anderson's men, who were scattered by the surprise attack. The troopers attacked the wagon train and burned a couple of dozen wagons. Anderson reorganized and threw back the Union attackers. William Wallace's brigade of Bushrod Johnson's division, Anderson's corps, also dispersed the attack of another Union cavalry brigade. Johnson's four remaining small brigades set up a line perpendicular to Pride's Church Road. Crook ordered the brigades of both J. Irvin Gregg and Charles H. Smith back to the column since Sheridan had ordered Crook to continue west towards Marshall's Crossroads with the rest of the cavalry.

A gap had opened in the line of march because Crook's cavalry had attacked and delayed Anderson's corps as it was protecting the wagons at Holt's Corner. After Crook's cavalry were driven off, Anderson crossed Little Sailor's Creek and reached Marshall's Crossroad, where he found that Union cavalry had found the gap in the line and blocked his way to Rice's Depot.

From his position on the right flank, Custer's division crossed Little Sailor's Creek at Gill's Mill, then noticed the gap between Mahone and Anderson about 1 mile (1.6 km) away at Marshall's Crossroad and blocked the road there while Crook's troopers were attacking the rear of Anderson's column. In this space were slow-moving artillery pieces. Custer's men charged the artillery, capturing ten pieces before being driven off by Anderson's infantry. Other Union cavalry came up to harass Anderson's line. Anderson's men counterattacked but then held up. A Virginia soldier later said that a large number of Union troopers then moved ahead of them while they were digging in instead of moving on.

Anderson then turned to cross Little Sailor's Creek when Gordon's corps came up to Holt's Corner. Johnson's and Pickett's divisions set up breastworks across the road as Ewell's corps also crossed to set up a defensive line. Anderson's position was almost 1 mile (1.6 km) south of Ewell's position on a ridge across Sailor's Creek.

The Union cavalry charged Anderson's infantry several times. Finally, Colonel Henry Capehart's brigade of Custer's division delivered a fierce blow to the Confederate line, followed by the attack of other brigades, including a charge by Brigadier General Henry E. Davies, Jr., which was praised by General Crook and caused the entire line to collapse and the survivors to flee.

=== Wright v. Ewell: Battle of Hillsman's House ===
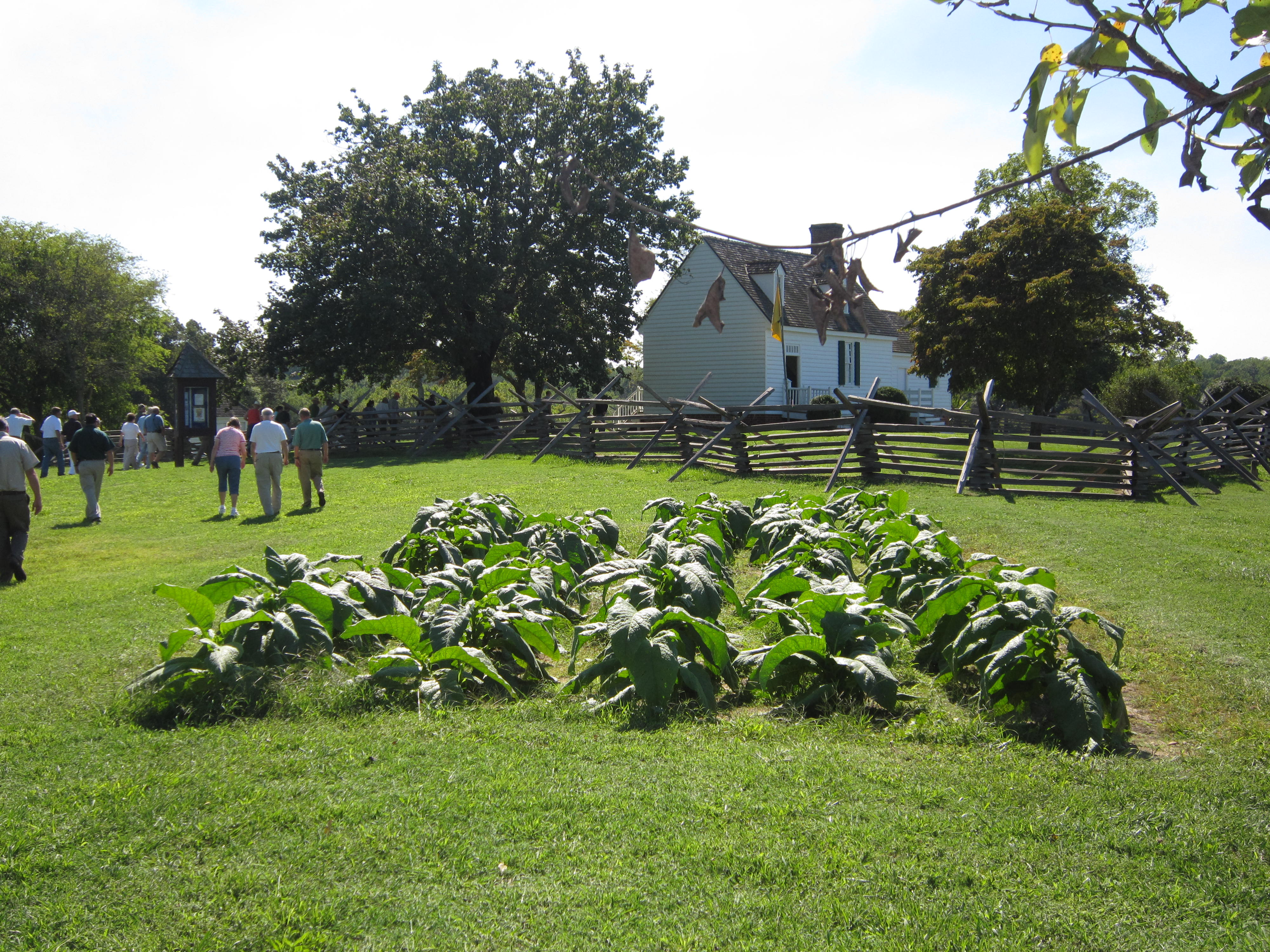
The Hillsman House and grounds, as they existed in 2012

Fitzhugh Lee's cavalry had discovered the Union cavalry force blocking Anderson's corps and advised Lieutenant General Richard Ewell of the obstruction on the road ahead. Ewell directed that the trailing wagon train head north on the Jamestown Road at Holt's Corner avoid the Union force on the Deatonville-Rice's Station Road. Ewell's corps then closed about a 1 mile (1.6 km) gap with Anderson's corps and helped Anderson with the repulse of Crook's second attack on Anderson.

After Anderson crossed Little Sailor's Creek and passed over the crest of the hill, Ewell moved his force to higher ground on the other side of the creek, leaving men from Colonel William H. Fitzgerald's brigade and the 24th Virginia Cavalry Regiment as a rear guard at the Hillsman farm. Ewell and Anderson met to confer about whether to attack the cavalry force in their front or head through the woods toward Farmville. Before they could finish their discussion, Major General Horatio G. Wright's VI Corps appeared in Ewell's rear, forcing Anderson's corps to face the Union cavalry moving up from the south at Marshall's Crossroads, while Ewell's corps had to confront the Union infantry at Hillsman's House. The two corps fought almost back-to-back against the encircling Union forces.

As the VI Corps closed up on Ewell's corps, Ewell deployed Major General Joseph B. Kershaw's Division on the right, Custis Lee's division on the left and the naval battalion under Commander John R. Tucker in the middle. Wright's corps came up at about 4:30 p.m. and saw Ewell's force forming a line of battle on the north side of Sailor's Creek. Brigades from the VI Corps divisions of Brigadier General Truman Seymour and Brigadier General (Brevet Major General) Frank Wheaton formed up against them. Major General Sheridan was on the scene and a soldier nearby said it was evident that Sheridan's object was to surround Ewell's Confederates.

The VI Corps attacked Ewell's line at about 6:00 p.m. after an artillery bombardment during which Ewell's men hastily built modest fortifications. Many Union soldiers were shot down crossing Sailor's Creek which was more like a swamp as much as 100 yards (91 m) wide in some places. Wheaton's men reorganized under the crest of a hill and resumed their movement up the hill. The rapidly moving middle of the line was driven back under intense fire and a Confederate counterattack. Since the Confederate line was shorter than the Union line, however, this led the Confederate attackers into a double envelopment. The twenty guns of Union artillery under Brevet Major Andrew Cowan deployed at the Hillsman Farm played a key role in their repulse. Fierce hand-to-hand combat took place before the Confederates finally saw that they were surrounded and gave up. The naval battalion under Commander Tucker was among the last of the surrounded Confederates to surrender. Prematurely, Lieutenant Colonel (Brevet Brigadier General) J. Warren Keifer rode forward to accepte the naval battalion's surrender only to have several sailors aim their muskets at him. Only through the intervention of Commander Tucker was Colonel Keifer spared and able to accept the actual surrender a short time later.

General Humphreys wrote that Ewell's entire command was killed, wounded or captured except about 250 men of Kershaw's division who escaped.

=== Casualties ===
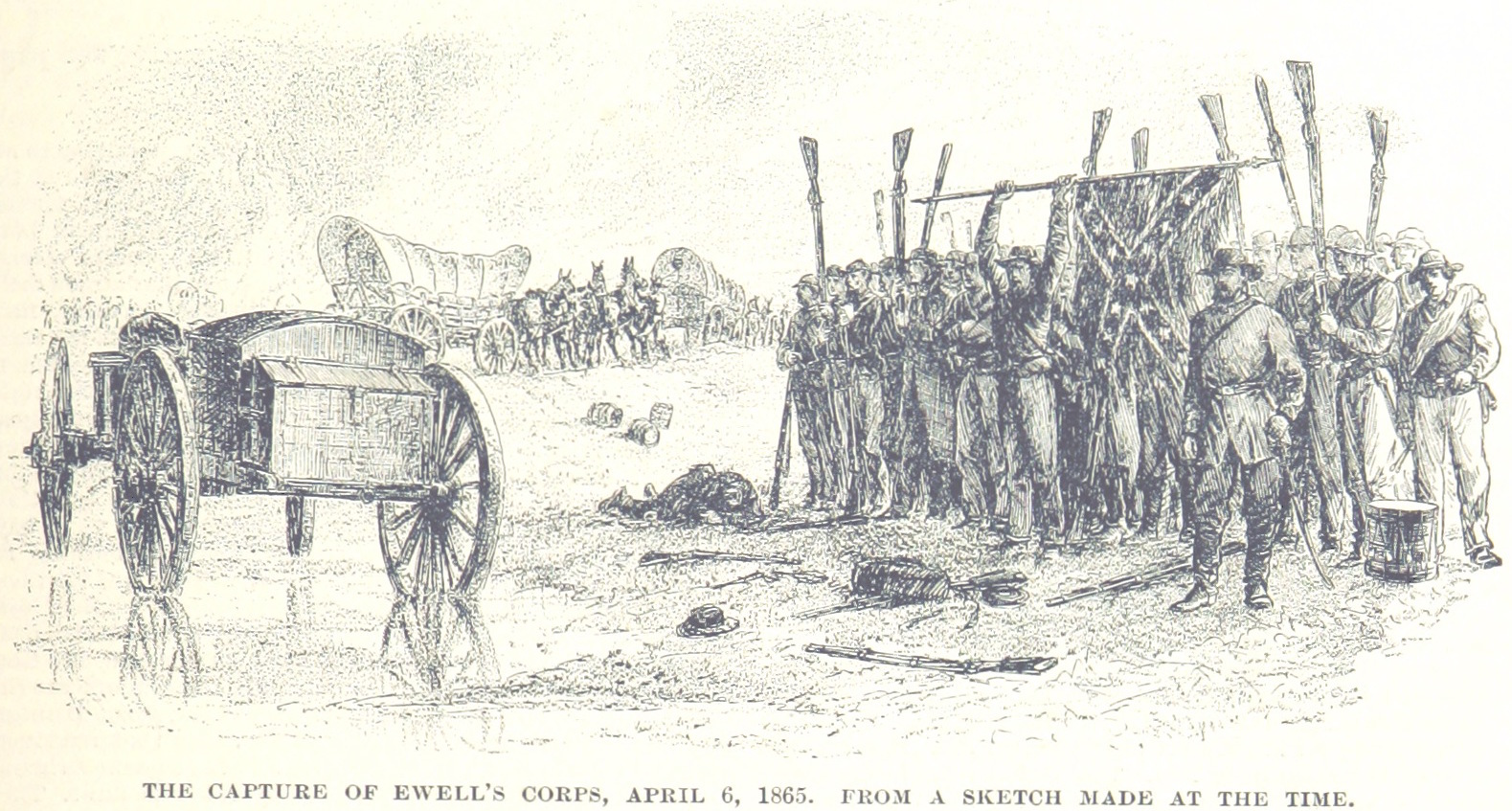
Ewell's corps is captured

General Humphreys reported 311 casualties in his corps and 442 in Wright's corps but he had no way to state the number of casualties suffered by the Union cavalry. Historian Noah Andre Trudeau states that the total Union loss was 1,180 killed and wounded.

Humphreys stated that the total Confederate loss in killed, wounded and captured was "not less than 8,000." Trudeau agreed with this number. He noted that despite the efforts of Anderson, Ewell and Gordon, the greater part of the wagon trains was destroyed. Humphreys wrote: "Ewell's whole force was lost, together with nearly half of Anderson's and a large part of Gordon's, all in a useless effort to save the trains."

At Sailor's Creek, about one fifth of the remaining retreating Confederate army was taken prisoner or became casualties. Many Confederate officers were captured, including generals Ewell, Kershaw, Custis Lee, Seth M. Barton, James P. Simms, Meriwether Lewis Clark, Sr., Dudley M. Du Bose, Eppa Hunton, and Montgomery D. Corse. (Note: Confederate Colonel (Brigadier General) Theodore W. Brevard, Jr. also was captured. He was the last general appointed by Jefferson Davis. His March 28 commission may not have reached him at the time of the battle so even Brevard himself may not have known he was a general. Marvel, 2002, p. 92.) Colonel Stapleton Crutchfield was killed leading a detachment of artillery personnel who had participated in the defenses of Richmond. General Humphreys also stated that disorder of the Confederates after their defeats at Five Forks, Sutherland's Station and the Breakthrough "doubtless scattered them to such an extent that many being without rations did not rejoin their commands." He went on to say that: "In the movement to Amelia Court House, and from that point to sailor's Creek, Farmville and Appomattox Court House, having but scanty supplies and being exhausted by want of sleep and food and overcome with fatigue, many men fell out or wandered in search of food."

== Aftermath ==
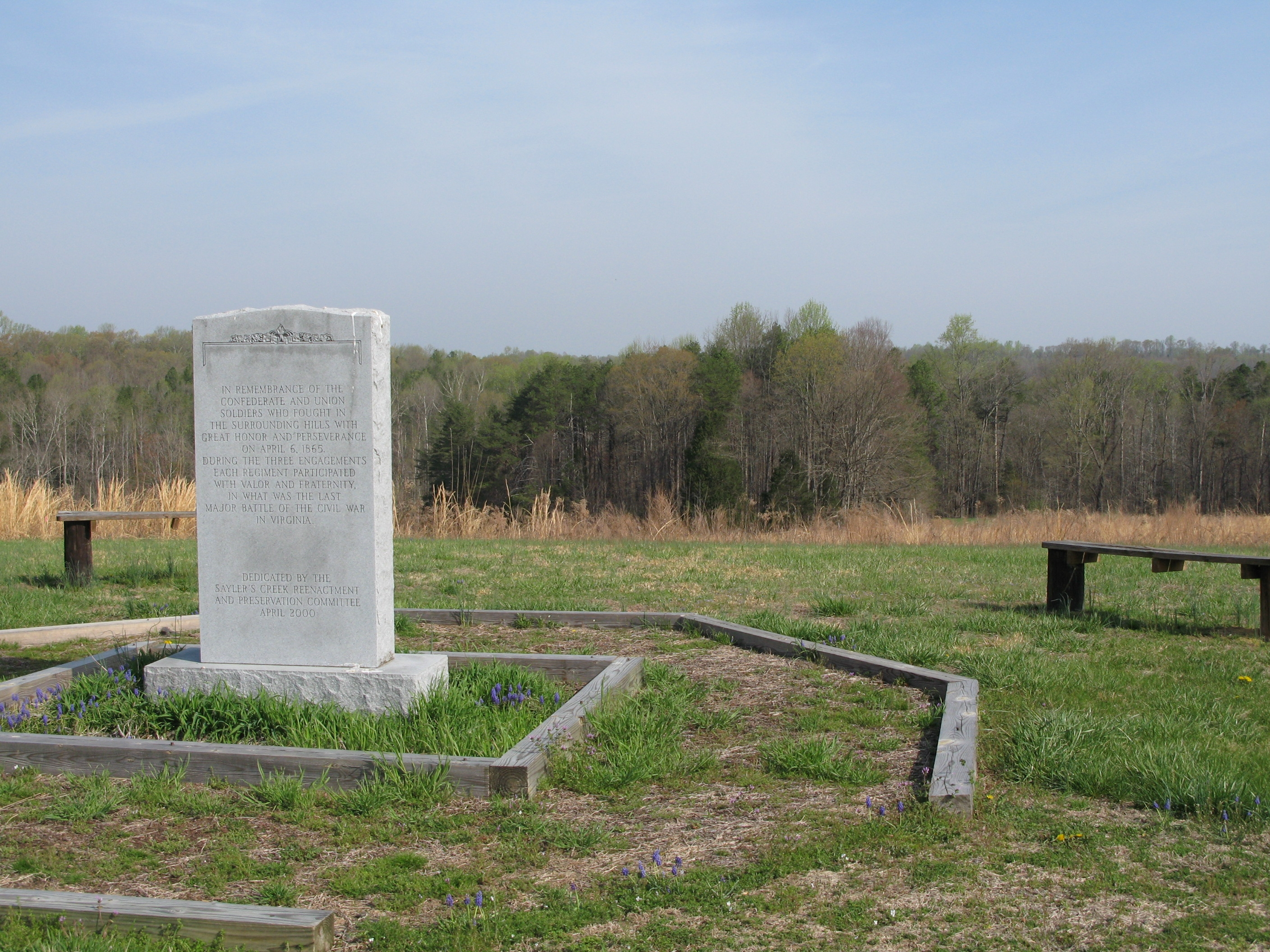
A monument at the site of the battle, dedicated in 2010

When a large part of the Confederate Army did not report to Rice's Station and Lee began to get reports of the defeat unfolding at Sailor's Creek, he returned to a bluff above the battlefield with Mahone's division.

Upon seeing the survivors streaming along the road, Lee exclaimed in front of Major General William Mahone, "My God, has the army dissolved?" to which General Mahone replied, "No, General, here are troops ready to do their duty." Touched by the faithful duty of his men, Lee told Mahone, "Yes, there are still some true men left ... Will you please keep those people back?"

Mahone's division remained on the opposite bank covering the escape of the fugitives but was not engaged in more combat.

Captain Tom Custer, brother of Brigadier General (Brevet Major General) George Armstrong Custer, received a second Medal of Honor in four days for his actions in this battle. This followed his first medal for actions at the Battle of Namozine Church on April 3, 1865.

General Philip Sheridan declared that the battle had been so overshadowed by Lee's surrender three days later that it was never accorded the prominence it deserved.

== Battlefield preservation ==
The Sayler's Creek Battlefield was designated a National Historic Landmark in 1985. Some of the battlefield makes up Sailor's Creek Battlefield Historical State Park. The American Battlefield Trust and its partners have acquired and preserved 1,319 acres (5.34 km^{2}) of the battlefield in seven transactions from 1996 through mid-2023.

== See also ==
- Sailor's Creek Battlefield Historical State Park
- Sayler's Creek Battlefield
