= National Register of Historic Places listings in Nottoway County, Virginia =

Location of Nottoway County in Virginia

This is a list of the National Register of Historic Places listings in Nottoway County, Virginia.

This is intended to be a complete list of the properties and districts on the National Register of Historic Places in Nottoway County, Virginia, United States. The locations of National Register properties and districts for which the latitude and longitude coordinates are included below, may be seen in an online map.

There are 12 properties and districts listed on the National Register in the county.

This National Park Service list is complete through NPS recent listings posted March 6, 2026.

== Current listings ==
	Name on the Register	Image	Date listed	Location	City or town	Description
1	Blackstone Historic District	Blackstone Historic District	January 25, 1991 (#90002174)	Roughly bounded by Mann, Dillard, Tavern, S. High, Oak, 8th, and Freeman Sts., and the former Norfolk and Western railroad tracks 37°04′49″N 77°59′52″W	Blackstone	
2	Burke's Tavern	Burke's Tavern	July 17, 1975 (#75002027)	1.5 miles (2.4 km) west of Burkeville at the junction of Orchard and Burke Tavern Rds. 37°11′43″N 78°14′17″W	Burkeville	
3	Crewe Commercial Historic District		June 5, 2023 (#100009026)	Carolina and Virginia Aves., Carter, Powell, and Tyler Sts. 37°10′32″N 78°07′30″W	Crewe	
4	Hyde Park	Hyde Park	May 28, 2013 (#13000341)	6808 W. Courthouse Rd. 37°07′17″N 78°10′17″W	Burkeville	
5	Inverness	Inverness	December 22, 1999 (#99001602)	884 Inverness Ave. 37°11′07″N 78°11′17″W	Burkeville	
6	Little Mountain Pictograph Site		February 15, 1991 (#91000021)	Address Restricted	Blackstone	
7	Millbrook	Millbrook	March 23, 2010 (#10000094)	1204 Snead Spring Rd. 37°05′59″N 78°07′57″W	Crewe	
8	Mountain Hall	Mountain Hall	March 13, 2002 (#02000184)	181 Mountain Hall Dr. 37°12′29″N 78°05′25″W	Crewe	
9	Nottoway County Courthouse	Nottoway County Courthouse	August 13, 1973 (#73002045)	Off U.S. Route 460 on Courthouse Rd. 37°07′42″N 78°04′48″W	Nottoway	
10	Oakridge	Oakridge	January 30, 1978 (#78003035)	West of Blackstone off Hungarytown Rd. 37°05′04″N 78°05′22″W	Blackstone	
11	Schwartz Tavern	Schwartz Tavern	June 28, 1974 (#74002140)	111 Tavern St. 37°04′54″N 77°59′44″W	Blackstone	
12	WSVS Radio Station		March 15, 2022 (#100007524)	1032 Melody Ln. 37°11′41″N 78°10′00″W	Crewe	

== See also ==
- List of National Historic Landmarks in Virginia
- National Register of Historic Places listings in Virginia
