= Earls, Virginia =

Unincorporated community in Virginia, United States

- Unincorporated community
- Location within the Commonwealth of Virginia Earls, Virginia (the United States)
- Coordinates: 37°13′44″N 77°53′32″W
- Country: United States
- State: Virginia
- County: Amelia
- Elevation: 330 ft (100 m)
- Time zone: UTC−5 (Eastern (EST))
  - Summer (DST): UTC−4 (EDT)
- ZIP code: 23002
- Area code: 804
- FIPS code: 51-24240
- GNIS feature ID: 1499368

Earls (also called "Earl", according to the USGS) is a rural unincorporated community in southeastern Amelia County in the U.S. state of Virginia. It is located in Jackson District along SR 153 at the southern end of SR 641 (Earls Road), 1 mile (1.6 km) north of the Amelia–Nottoway county line. The area is served by the post office at Amelia Court House, the county seat, 13 miles (21 km) northwest. The nearest fire station to Earls is Amelia County Volunteer Fire Department Station 2, at Mannboro, 5 miles (8 km) northeast.

== Name & post office ==
Documentation on the precise origin of the name is lacking, and it is missing from Civil War–era maps. By the turn of the century, however, Earls was a post village, with one of tens of thousands of small mail facilities that then dotted the American countryside. Most of these "fourth class" post offices around the US were closed in the early 1900s amid the spread of rural free delivery; Earls was among the last of a long series of Amelia County communities to lose its postal facility. Earl's Grocery continued to operate on Highway 153 just south of Route 641 until around the year 2000.

== History ==
The immediate vicinity of what is now Earls appears to have been spared significant action during most of the Civil War. Troops from both sides passed close by during the final days of the war in early April 1865, as Confederate forces retreated westward and Union forces pursued and flanked the Rebels. However, most of the movement around Earls would have occurred during a brief lull in the fighting, between the Battle of Namozine Church and a series of increasingly bloody and desperate engagements in central and western Amelia County. General Robert E. Lee surrendered to Ulysses S. Grant at Appomattox on April 9.

Manassas (or Manassa) Hill School, built sometime between 1917 and 1920, was one of the first of at least a dozen Rosenwald Schools in Amelia County. The particular design for Manassas Hill called for a 1-acre campus with a building to accommodate one teacher; the school was located on SR 615 (modern-day Namozine Road) near Earls. During the early 20th century, the Rosenwald School project was a collaborative effort that constructed thousands of facilities across the South primarily to improve the education of African American children. After desegregation, the Rosenwald model became obsolete, and many former Rosenwald properties were demolished or sold. The Manassas Hill property, along with several other former Rosenwald Schools in Amelia County, was put up for auction in the late 1960s.

Manaza (or "Manassa") Hill Baptist, a historic African American church, is 2 miles north of Earls on Route 615. Although the church and the school have similar names and were located on the same road, it is unclear what the connection may have been between the two.
