= Blackstone Historic District =

Historic district in Virginia, United States

- U.S. National Register of Historic Places
- U.S. Historic district
- Virginia Landmarks Register
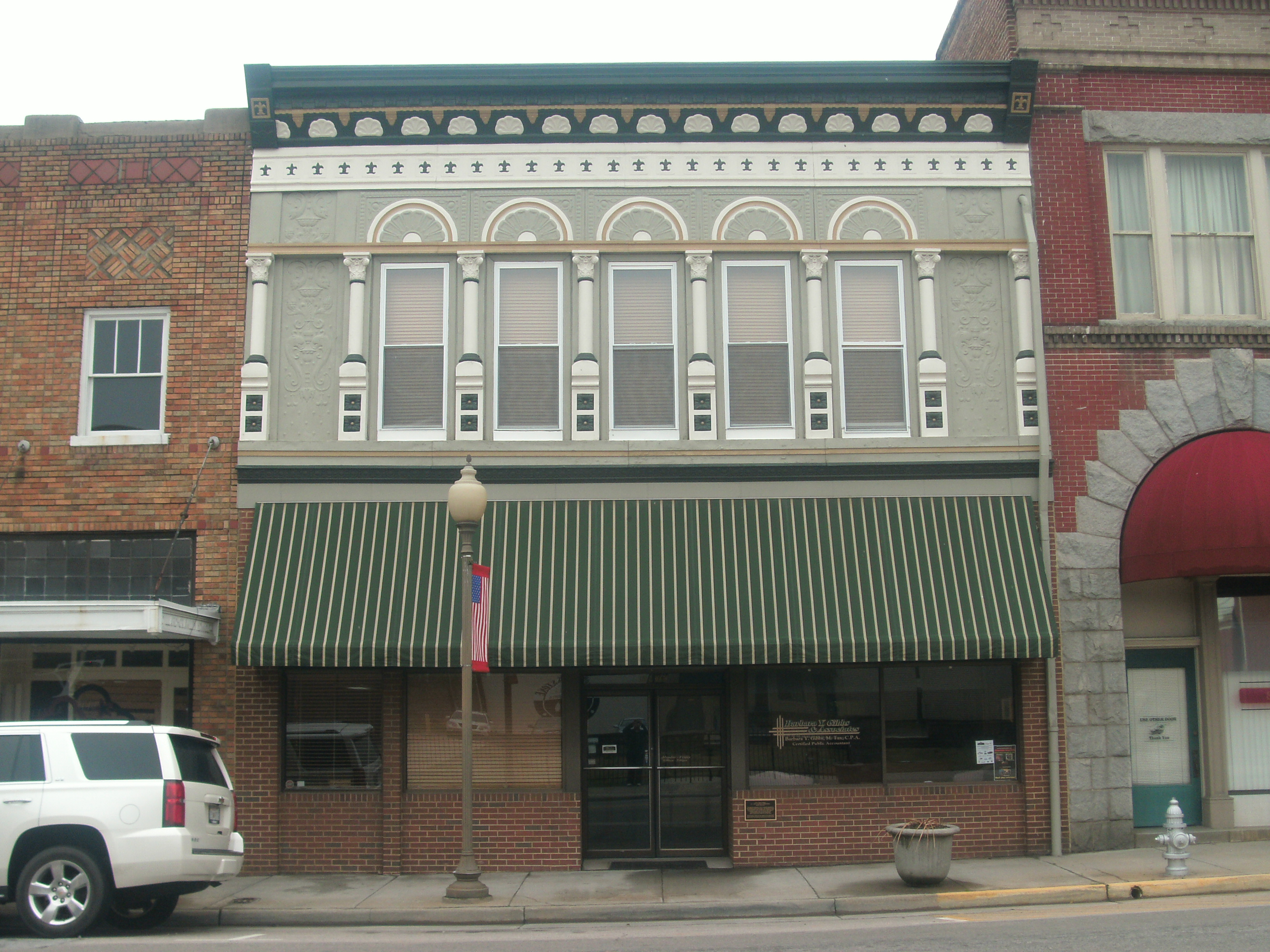
- 110 S. Main Street, listed as part of the District, seen in April, 2015

- Location within Virginia Location within the United States
- Location: Roughly bounded by Mann, Dillard, Tavern, S. High, Oak, Eighth and Freeman Sts. and the Norfolk and Western RR tracks, Blackstone, Virginia
- Coordinates: 37°4′29″N 78°00′13″W
- Area: 208 acres (84 ha)
- Architect: Multiple
- Architectural style: Late Gothic Revival, Queen Anne, Romanesque
- NRHP reference No.: 90002174
- VLR No.: 142-0007

Significant dates
- Added to NRHP: January 25, 1991
- Designated VLR: February 20, 1990

Blackstone Historic District is a national historic district located at Blackstone, Nottoway County, Virginia. It encompasses 272 contributing buildings and 1 contributing structure in the town of Blackstone. They include residential and commercial structures dating from the late-18th to early-20th centuries. They include notable examples of the Late Gothic Revival, Queen Anne, and Romanesque styles. Notable buildings include the former Blackstone College for Girls (1922), First National Bank, Thomas M. Dillard House, Richmond F. Dillard House, Blackstone Public School Complex, Bagley House (1911), James D. Crawley House (1903), Blackstone Baptist Church (1907), Crenshaw United Methodist Church (1903), St. Luke's Episcopal Church (1916), and Blackstone Presbyterian Church (1901). The James D. Crawley House was designed by J. E. McDaniel, who was a local architect. Located in the district is the separately listed Schwartz Tavern.

It was listed on the National Register of Historic Places in 1991.

== Gallery ==
Blackstone Contributing Buildings

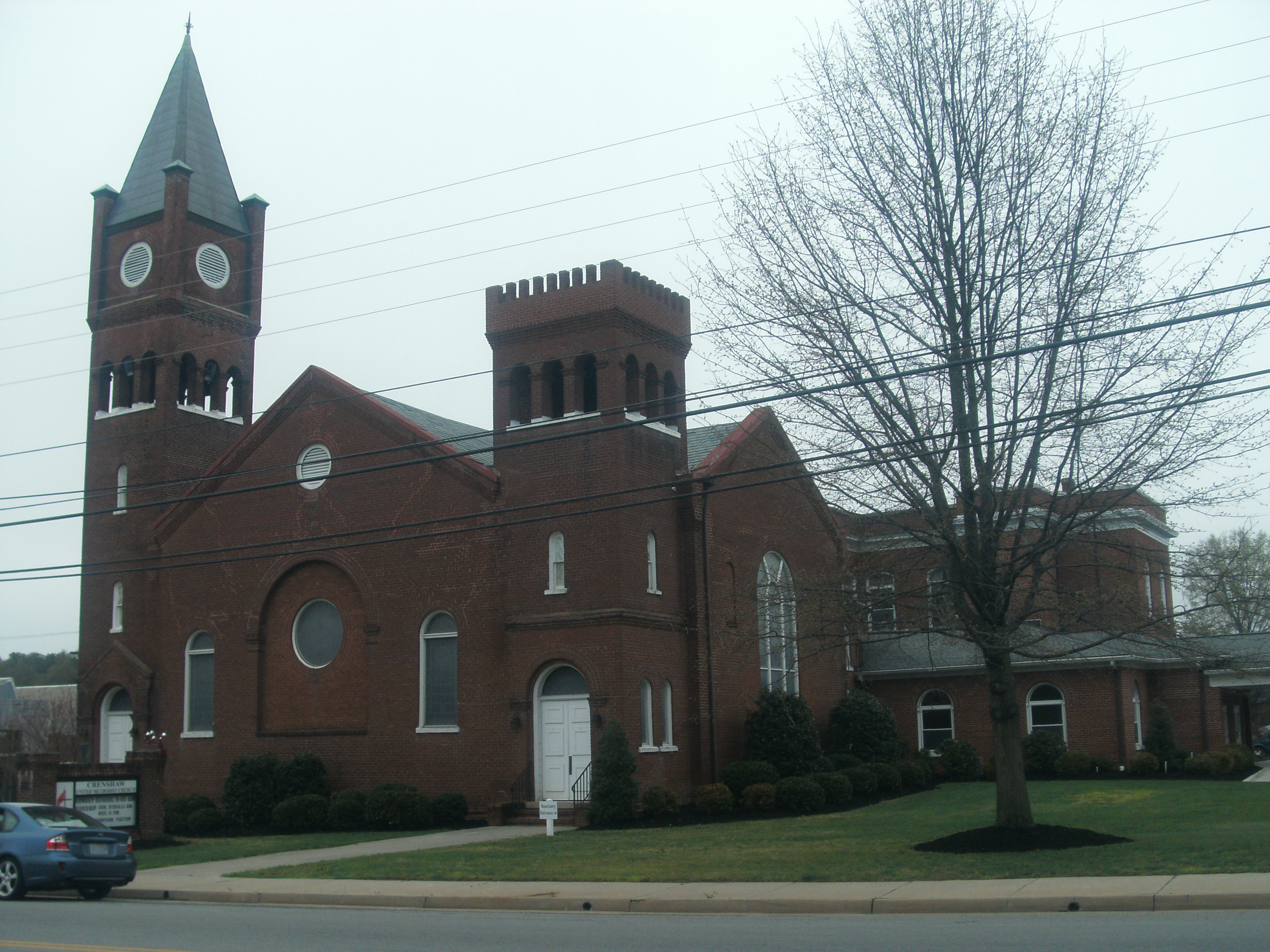
Crenshaw United Methodist Church

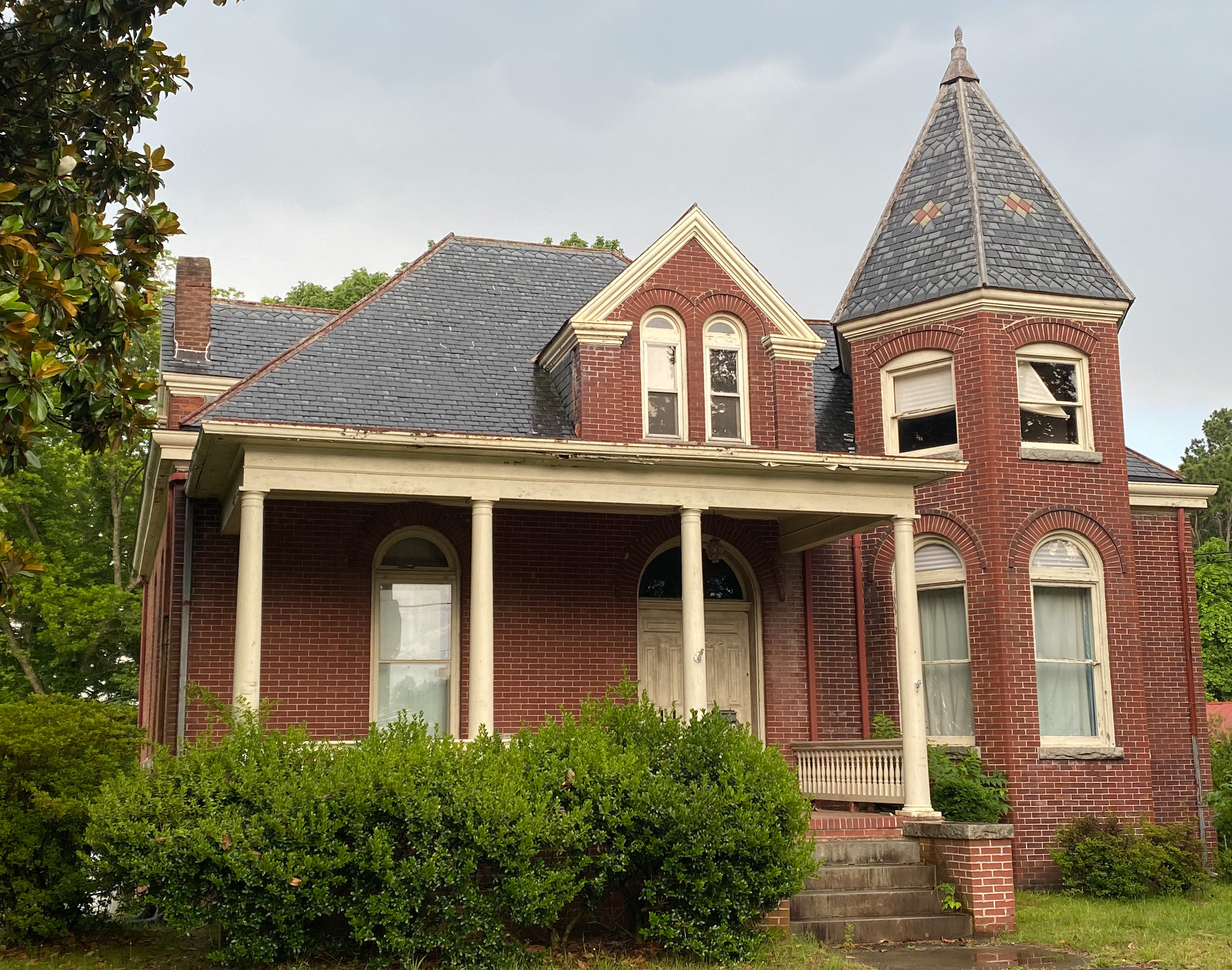
Thomas M. Dillard House

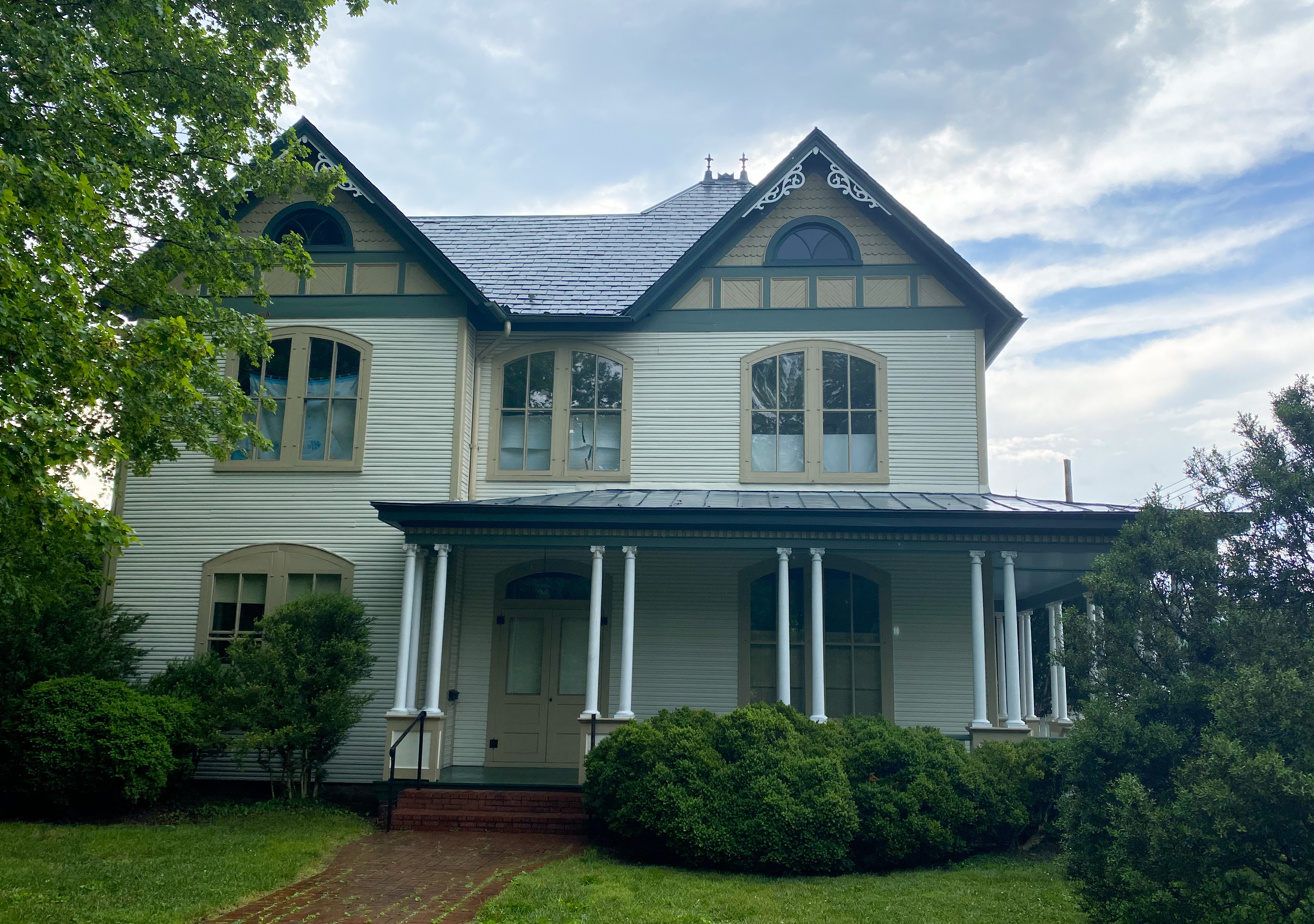
James D. Crawley House

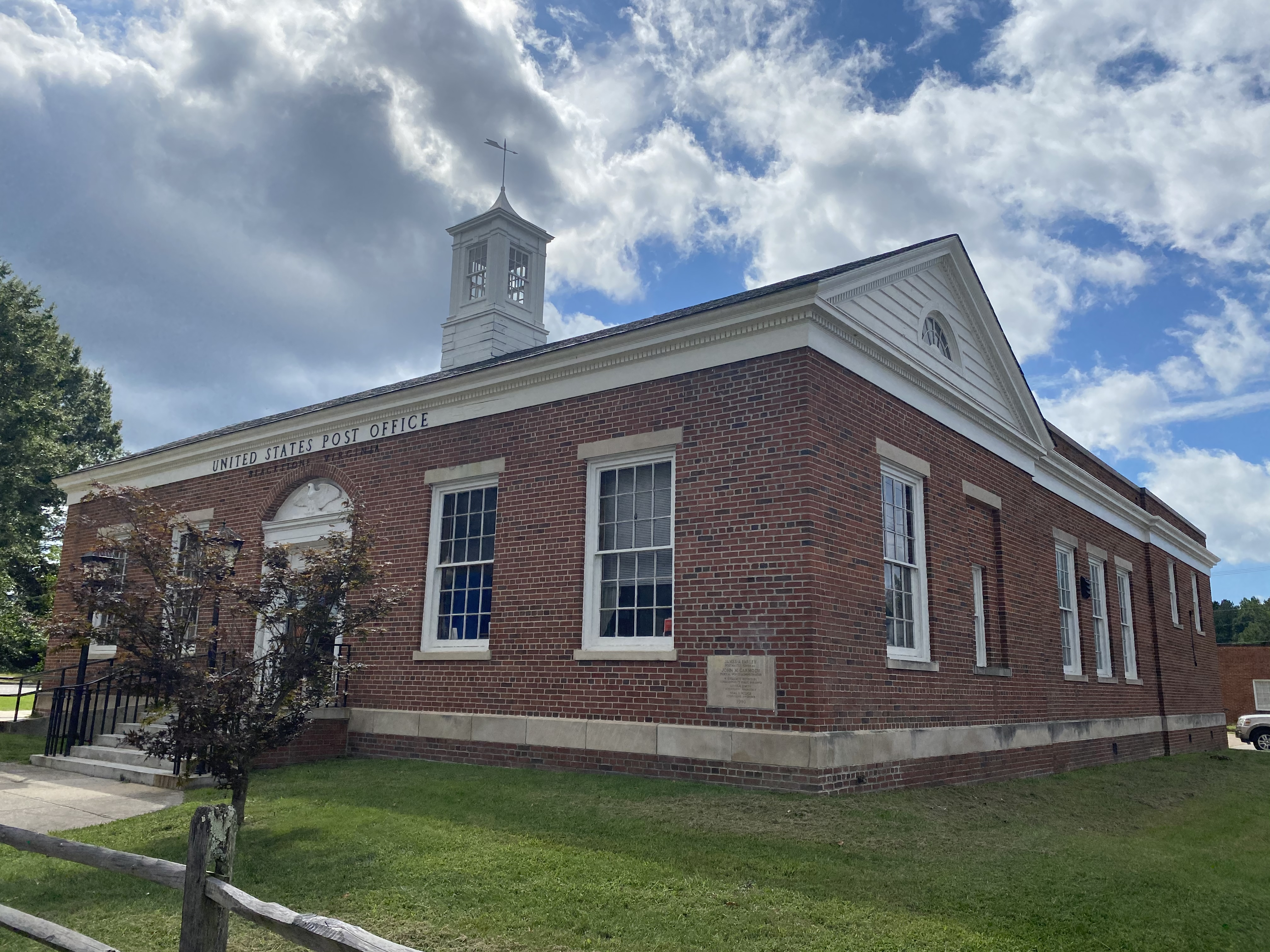
Federal Post Office

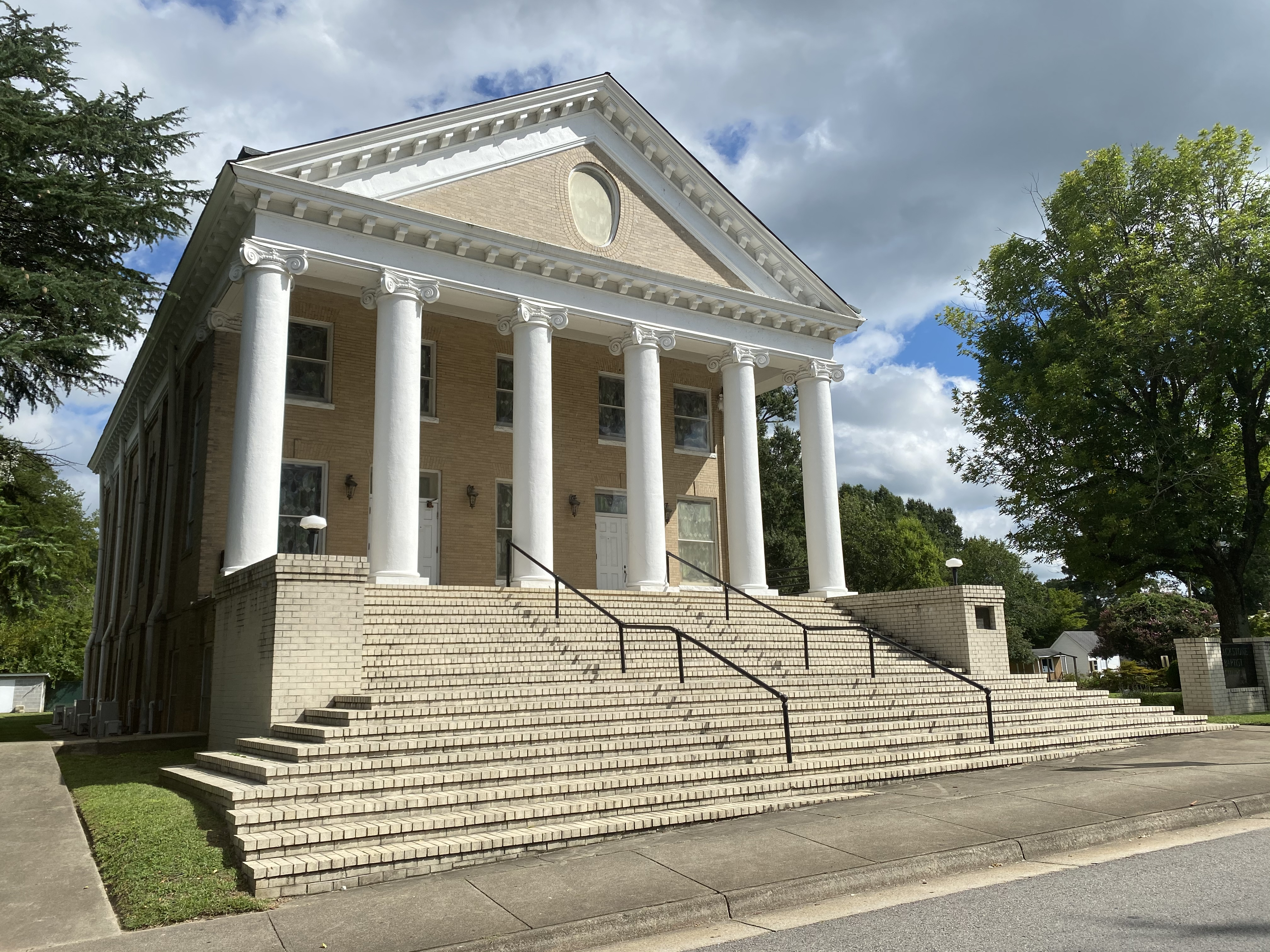
Romanesque Baptist Church built in 1907

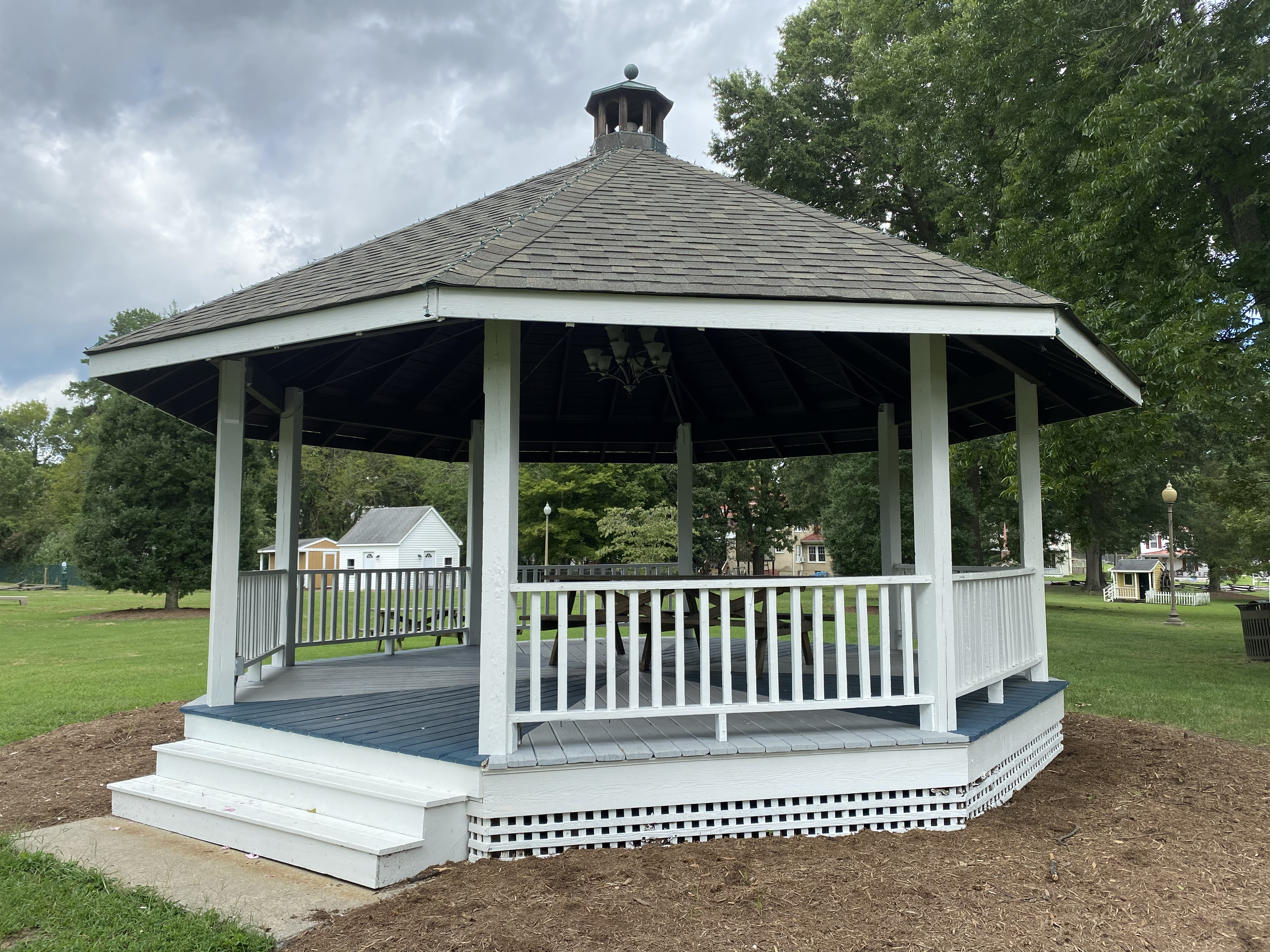
Seay’s Park is the site of businessman Haney H. Seay’s residence. The Seay home used as the Blackstone Day School in the 1960s., and then part of Kenston Forest School. It was eventually torn down in the 1970s. The house was demolished in the early 1970s.

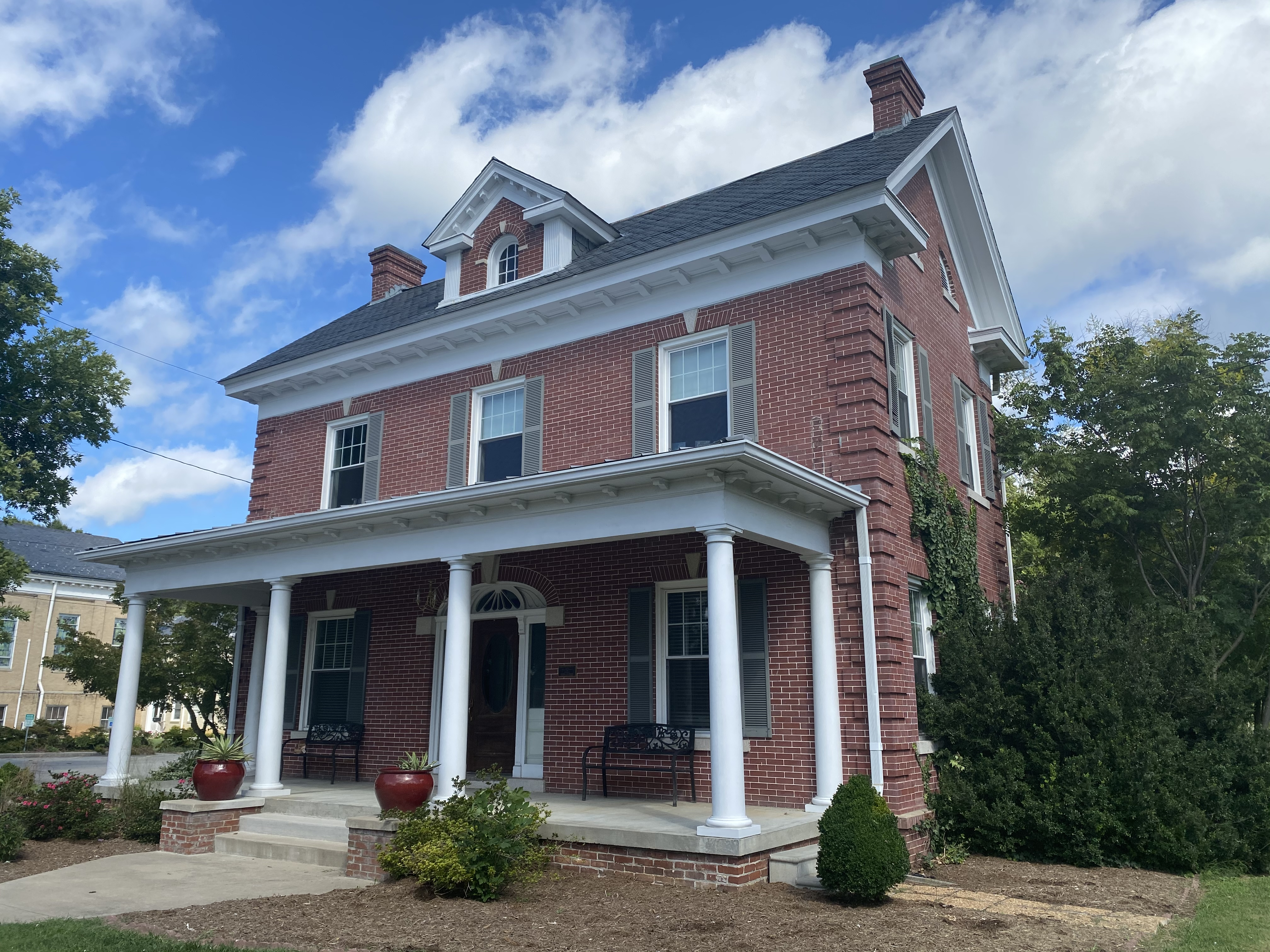
The Town Library in a 1915 Colonial Revival House

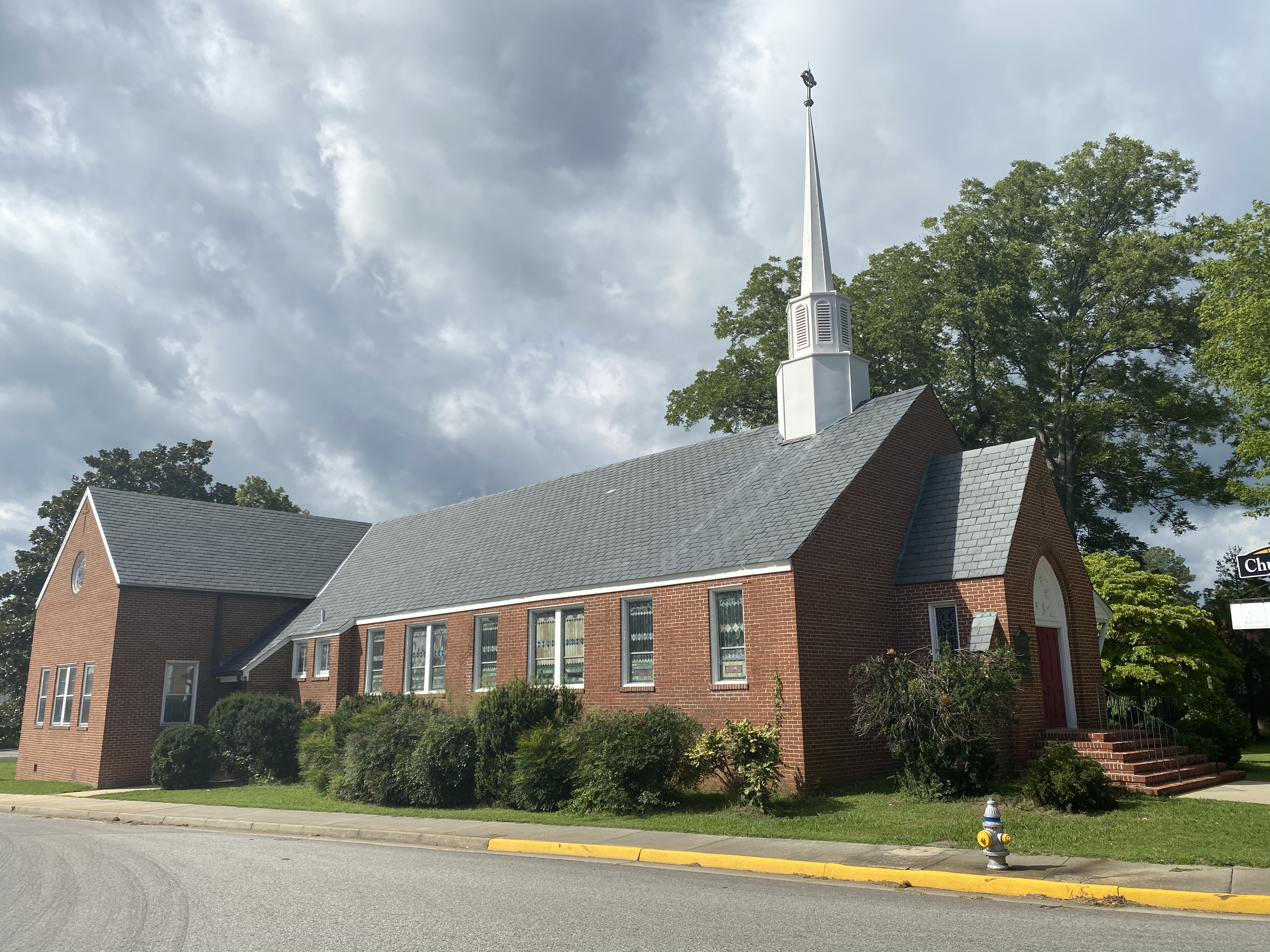
St Luke’s Episcopal Church with Gothic Revival Architecture built in 1898

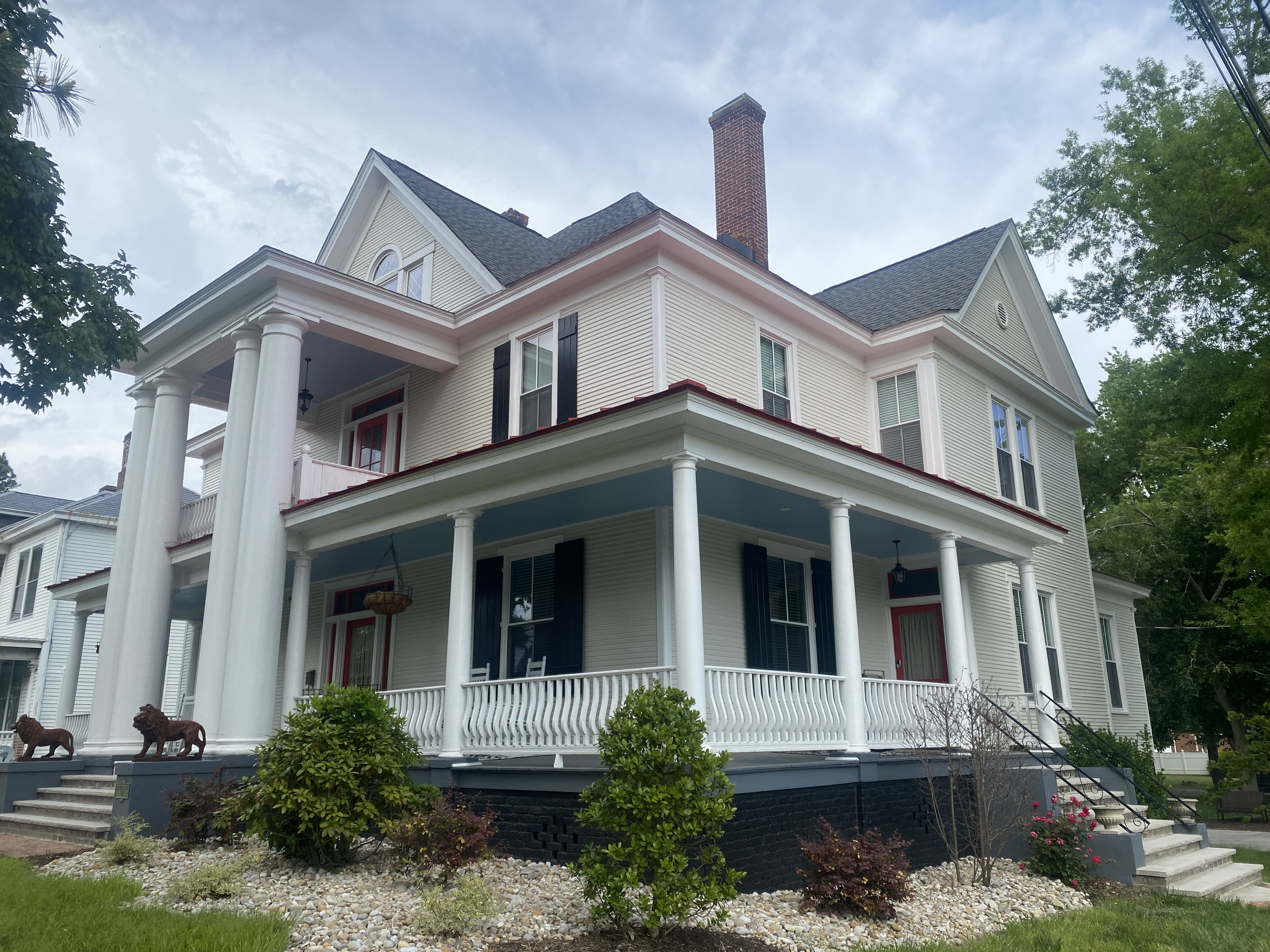
The 1911 Bagley House
