= Spainville, Virginia =

Unincorporated community in Virginia, United States

- Unincorporated community
- Location within Virginia Location within the United States
- Coordinates: 37°11′20″N 77°54′58″W
- Country: United States
- State: Virginia
- County: Nottoway
- Elevation: 394 ft (120 m)
- Time zone: UTC−5 (Eastern (EST))
  - Summer (DST): UTC−4 (EDT)
- GNIS feature ID: 1477774

Spainville is an unincorporated community in Nottoway County, Virginia, United States.
