= Virginia State Route 153 =

State highway in central Virginia, US

State Route 153

Route information
- Maintained by VDOT
- Length: 17.15 mi (27.60 km)
- Existed: 1933–present

Major junctions
- South end: US 460 near Blackstone
- SR 38 / SR 602 at Scotts Fork
- North end: US 360 near Winterham

Location
- Country: United States
- State: Virginia
- Counties: Nottoway, Amelia

Highway system
- Virginia Routes; Interstate; US; Primary; Secondary; Byways; History; HOT lanes
← SR 152	→ SR 154

State Route 153 (SR 153) is a primary state highway in the U.S. state of Virginia. The state highway runs 17.15 miles (27.60 km) from U.S. Route 460 (US 460) near Blackstone north to US 360 near Winterham. SR 153 is the primary north–south highway of eastern Amelia County. The state highway also provides a connection between Blackstone and Richmond in conjunction with US 360.

== Route description ==
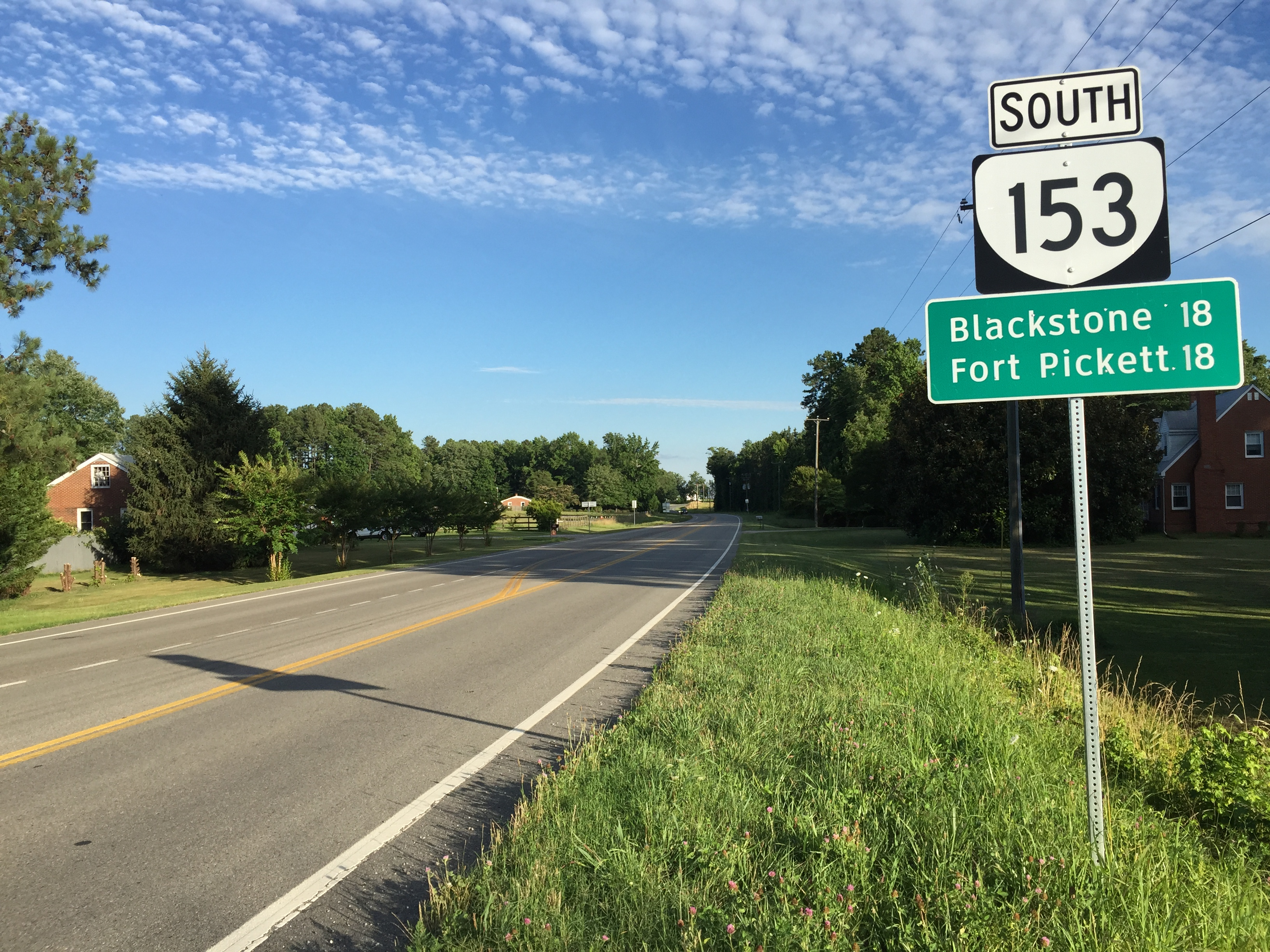
View south along SR 153 at SR 38 and SR 602 in Scotts Fork

SR 153 begins at an intersection with US 460 (Colonial Trail Highway) at the eastern edge of Nottoway County northeast of Blackstone. The state highway heads north as Rocky Hill Road. SR 153 becomes Military Road when entering Amelia County. The state highway then passes through the hamlets of Earls and Wilsons Corner. After crossing Deep Creek, a tributary of the Appomattox River, SR 153 meets the eastern end of SR 38 (Five Forks Road), which heads west to Amelia Court House, at Scotts Fork. The state highway has its northern terminus at US 360 (Patrick Henry Highway) east of Winterham.

== Major intersections ==
County	Location	mi	km	Destinations	Notes
Nottoway		0.00	0.00	US 460 (Colonial Trail Highway)	Southern terminus
Amelia		11.2	18.0	SR 708 (Cralles Road) – Mannboro, Sutherland	former SR 38 east
Amelia	Scotts Fork	14.23	22.90	SR 38 west (Five Forks Road) / SR 602 (Bevils Bridge Road) – Amelia	former planned SR 153 north
Amelia		17.15	27.60	US 360 (Patrick Henry Highway) – Amelia, Danville, Richmond	Northern terminus
1.000 mi = 1.609 km; 1.000 km = 0.621 mi

< SR 404	District 4 State Routes; 1928–1933	SR 406 >
