= Fergusonville, Virginia =

Unincorporated community in Virginia, United States

- Unincorporated community
- Location within Virginia Location within the United States
- Coordinates: 37°13′4″N 78°4′14″W
- Country: United States
- State: Virginia
- County: Nottoway
- Elevation: 377 ft (115 m)
- Time zone: UTC-5 (Eastern (EST))
  - Summer (DST): UTC-4 (EDT)
- GNIS feature ID: 1492936

Fergusonville is an unincorporated community in Nottoway County, Virginia, United States.
