= Oakridge (Blackstone, Virginia) =

Historic house in Virginia, United States

- U.S. National Register of Historic Places
- Virginia Landmarks Register
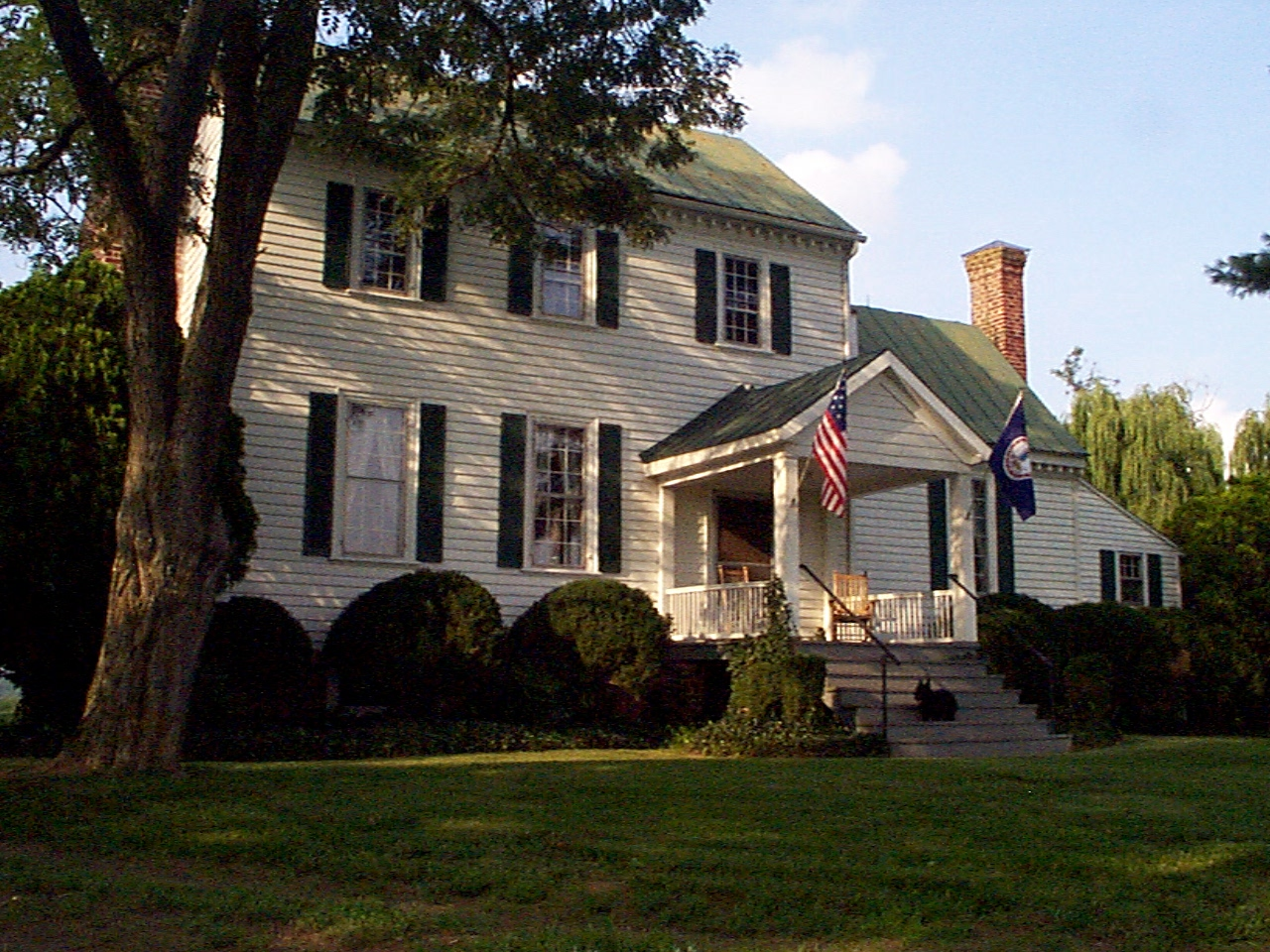
- Oakridge, September 2012

- Location within Virginia Location within the United States
- Location: W of Blackstone off VA 626, Blackstone, Virginia
- Coordinates: 37°5′4″N 78°5′26″W
- Area: 149 acres (60 ha)
- NRHP reference No.: 78003035
- VLR No.: 067-0014

Significant dates
- Added to NRHP: January 30, 1978
- Designated VLR: March 15, 1977

Oakridge is an historic home located near Blackstone, Nottoway County, Virginia. The main house is an early 19th-century frame structure consisting of a two-story, three-bay western section and a 1 1/2-story, one-bay east wing. It sits on a brick foundation and has a gable roof with modillion cornice. The interior features a handsome stair in the Chinese Chippendale taste.

It was listed on the National Register of Historic Places in 1978.
