= Booker T. Spicely =

Booker Thomas Spicely (December 1, 1909 – July 8, 1944) was a victim of racial violence whose murder in North Carolina, United States is considered to be one of a series of outrages that contributed to rising activism in the Civil Rights Movement. Other incidents in this period included Irene Morgan in July 1944 being arrested and jailed in Virginia for refusing to give up her seat on an interstate bus to a white person. The aftermath of Spicely's killing helped revitalize North Carolina's NAACP. Finally, on December 1, 2023, an NC State Historical Marker was erected in honor of B.T. Spicely at the intersection of W. Club Blvd and Broad St, Durham.

== Biography ==
Spicely was born in Blackstone, Virginia, to Lazarus and Alberta Spicely. He attended two years of high school and was a cook and chauffeur before volunteering for the United States Army on December 31, 1943, in Philadelphia, Pennsylvania. He did not work for the Tuskegee Institute like most stories say. It was his brother Robert who was actually the director of Commercial Dietetics at Tuskegee Institute. Booker Spicely's serial number was 33809308, and he was in the 3713th Quartermaster Company, a segregated truck company.

In 1944, Private Spicely was stationed at Camp Butner, North Carolina. While on a pass into the nearby city of Durham on July 8, 1944, he boarded a bus, owned and operated by Duke Power. Accompanied by a black woman he was talking to at the bus stop, and according to her sworn statement, they sat in the second to last seat and not in the front as reported. The driver told them all to move to the last seat for some white soldiers who boarded, as public transportation was segregated in North Carolina. The woman did, but Spicely refused, initially asking the other soldiers why he had to move since he was not aware of the laws in North Carolina. There was conflicting testimony exactly what PVT Spicely said but one of the white soldiers mentioned that he said "I thought I was fighting this war for democracy". The bus driver then said "shut up or get off".

During the ride, PVT Spicely continued arguing with the bus driver until he departed the bus. When he did, the driver followed him off the bus and shot Spicely twice when the soldier turned around. His cause of death is listed as homicide ("shot by bus driver"), with death occurring due to a "pistol shot wound through heart" with a secondary cause of "pistol shot through liver".

The driver, Herman Lee Council, a Duke Power employee, was tried for the second-degree murder of Spicely; he was acquitted by the all-white jury on the grounds of self-defense. Robert Spicely wrote to Chief Counsel for the NAACP, Thurgood Marshall, asking him to intercede in the case. Due to opposition from local Black leaders, NAACP lawyers did not play a direct role in the trial of Herman Lee Council.

According to some sources, due to Spicely's murder, a riot ensued in the tobacco warehouse district of Durham, resulting in the destruction (via arson) of several of the white-owned tobacco warehouses. However, contemporary newspaper accounts make no mention of a connection between Spicely's death and the warehouse district fire.

The War Department conducted an investigation of Spicely's death titled Subject: Racial Incident, Shooting of Negro Soldier, Durham, N.C. on 8 July 1944 at about 1940, dated July 12, 1944. His cause of death, which occurred during World War II, is listed as DNB, or “Died, Non-Battle.”

Spicely's body was returned to his home in Blackstone, Virginia, for burial. Herman Lee Council died in a nursing home in 1982.

The aftermath of Spicely's killing helped revitalize North Carolina's NAACP. The Durham branch of the NAACP was named for Private Spicely. Finally, on December 1, 2023, an NC State Historical Marker was erected in honor of B.T. Spicely at the intersection of W. Club Blvd and Broad St, Durham.
