= Virginia State Route 154 =

State highway in the City of Covington, Virginia, US

State Route 154

Route information
- Maintained by VDOT
- Length: 1.92 mi (3.09 km) 2 sections
- Existed: 1962–present

Southern section
- Length: 1.31 mi (2.11 km)
- South end: I-64 in Covington
- North end: Locust Street in Covington

Northern section
- Length: 0.61 mi (980 m)
- South end: Lexington Avenue in Covington
- Major intersections: US 60 in Covington
- North end: US 220 in Covington

Location
- Country: United States
- State: Virginia
- Counties: City of Covington

Highway system
- Virginia Routes; Interstate; US; Primary; Secondary; Byways; History; HOT lanes
← SR 153	→ SR 155

State Route 154 (SR 154) is a primary state highway in the U.S. state of Virginia. The state highway runs 1.92 miles (3.09 km) over two sections within the independent city of Covington. SR 154's 1.31-mile (2.11 km) southern section connects Interstate 64 (I-64) with Locust Street. The 0.61-mile (0.98 km) northern segment connects Lexington Avenue with U.S. Route 60 (US 60) and US 220.

== Route description ==
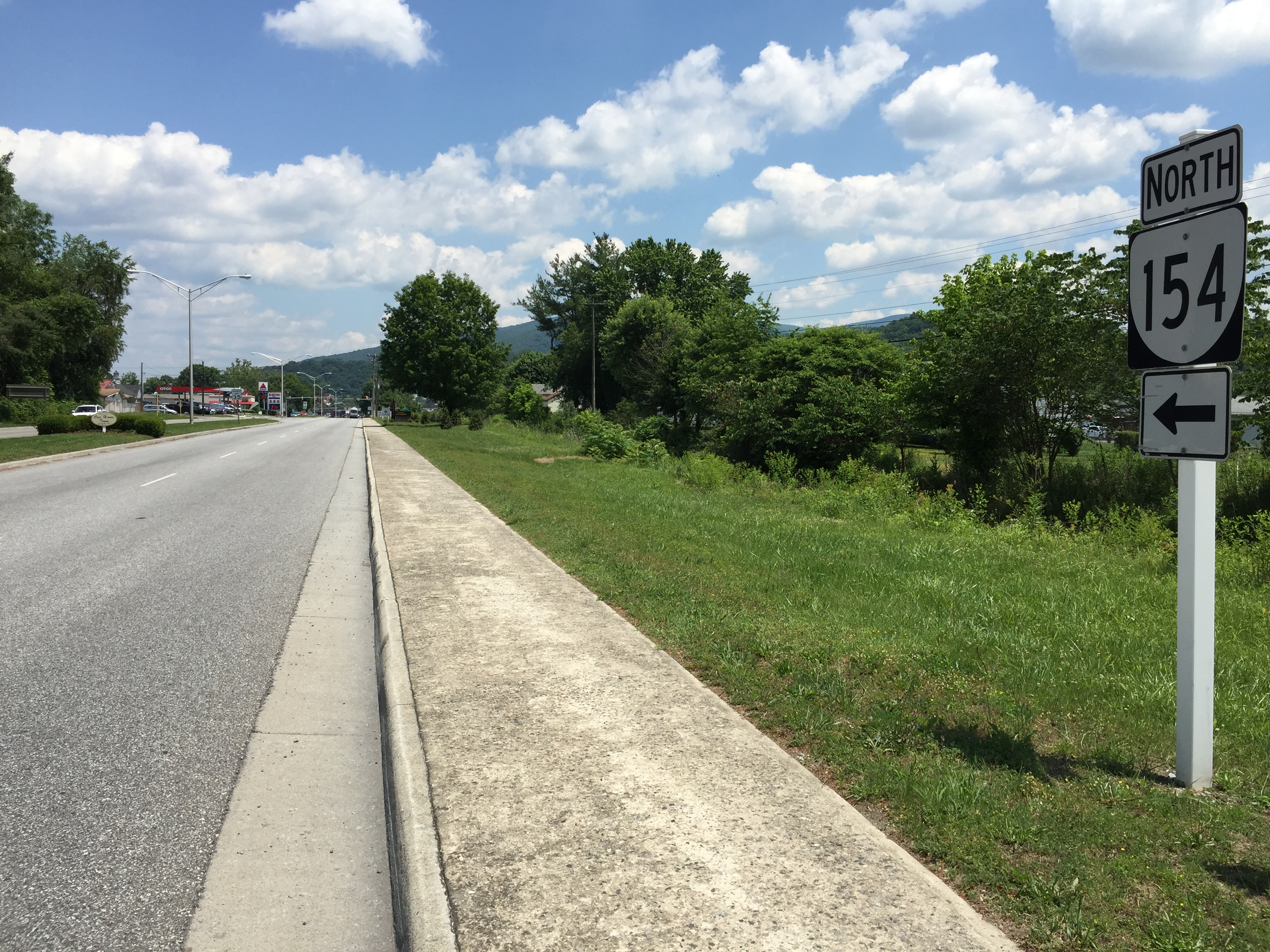
View north at the south end of SR 154 at I-64 in Covington

SR 154 begins at a partial cloverleaf interchange with I-64. The roadway continues south as unnumbered Durant Road. SR 154 heads north as an extension of Durant Road, a four-lane divided highway that parallels a rail spur to a manufacturing plant in the southern part of the city. The state highway and rail spur diverge as they cross the Jackson River. North of the bridge, Durant Road splits north to continue along the rail line while SR 154's divided highway curves to the northwest along Craig Avenue, which passes through a commercial area and intersects another rail spur. The state highway reduces to a two-lane undivided street at Chestnut Street, after which the highway passes between the baseball and football fields of Covington High School. SR 154 continues through a residential area to its southern segment's northern terminus at Locust Street.

The northern segment of SR 154 begins at Lexington Avenue on the edge of downtown Covington; the route's disjoint sections are connected by Locust Street and Lexington Avenue. The state highway heads northeast as Riverside Drive through a residential area one block west of Main Street and to the east of the parallel Jackson River. At the north end of the downtown area, SR 154 intersects US 60 (Monroe Avenue) just east of the U.S. Highway's bridge over the Jackson River at its confluence with Dunlap Creek. The state highway passes under CSX's Alleghany Subdivision on the opposite side of the river from the WestRock factory complex. SR 154 intersects another rail spur at an oblique angle, then turns east onto Hickory Street to reach its northern terminus at US 220 (Alleghany Avenue).

== Major intersections ==
The entire route is in Covington.

mi	km	Destinations	Notes
0.00	0.00	I-64 – Lexington, White Sulphur Springs	Exit 14 (I-64); southern terminus of southern section
1.31	2.11	Locust Street	Northern terminus of southern section
Gap in route
0.00	0.00	Lexington Street	Southern terminus of northern section
0.28	0.45	US 60 (Monroe Avenue)	
0.61	0.98	US 220 (Alleghany Avenue) – Hot Springs	Northern terminus of northern section
1.000 mi = 1.609 km; 1.000 km = 0.621 mi
