= Little Mountain Pictograph Site =

Archaeological site in Virginia, United States

- U.S. National Register of Historic Places
- Virginia Landmarks Register
- Nearest city: Blackstone, Virginia
- Area: 1 acre (0.40 ha)
- NRHP reference No.: 91000021
- VLR No.: 067-0107

Significant dates
- Added to NRHP: February 15, 1991
- Designated VLR: August 21, 1990

Little Mountain Pictograph Site is a historic archaeological site located near Blackstone, Nottoway County, Virginia. It is a winter solstice observation site that probably dates post-1400 AD and is Mississippian. It was recorded and published by the Virginia Rockart Survey. The three glyphs are located inside a cave or shallow shelter. They are a track glyph, hand glyph, and undefined glyph that appears to be a sun. The glyphs are in shadow all year except during the winter solstice, when the sun travels far enough south to illuminate the inside of the wall containing the glyphs.

It was listed on the National Register of Historic Places in 1991.
