= Schwartz Tavern =

Historic commercial building in Virginia, United States

- U.S. National Register of Historic Places
- Virginia Landmarks Register
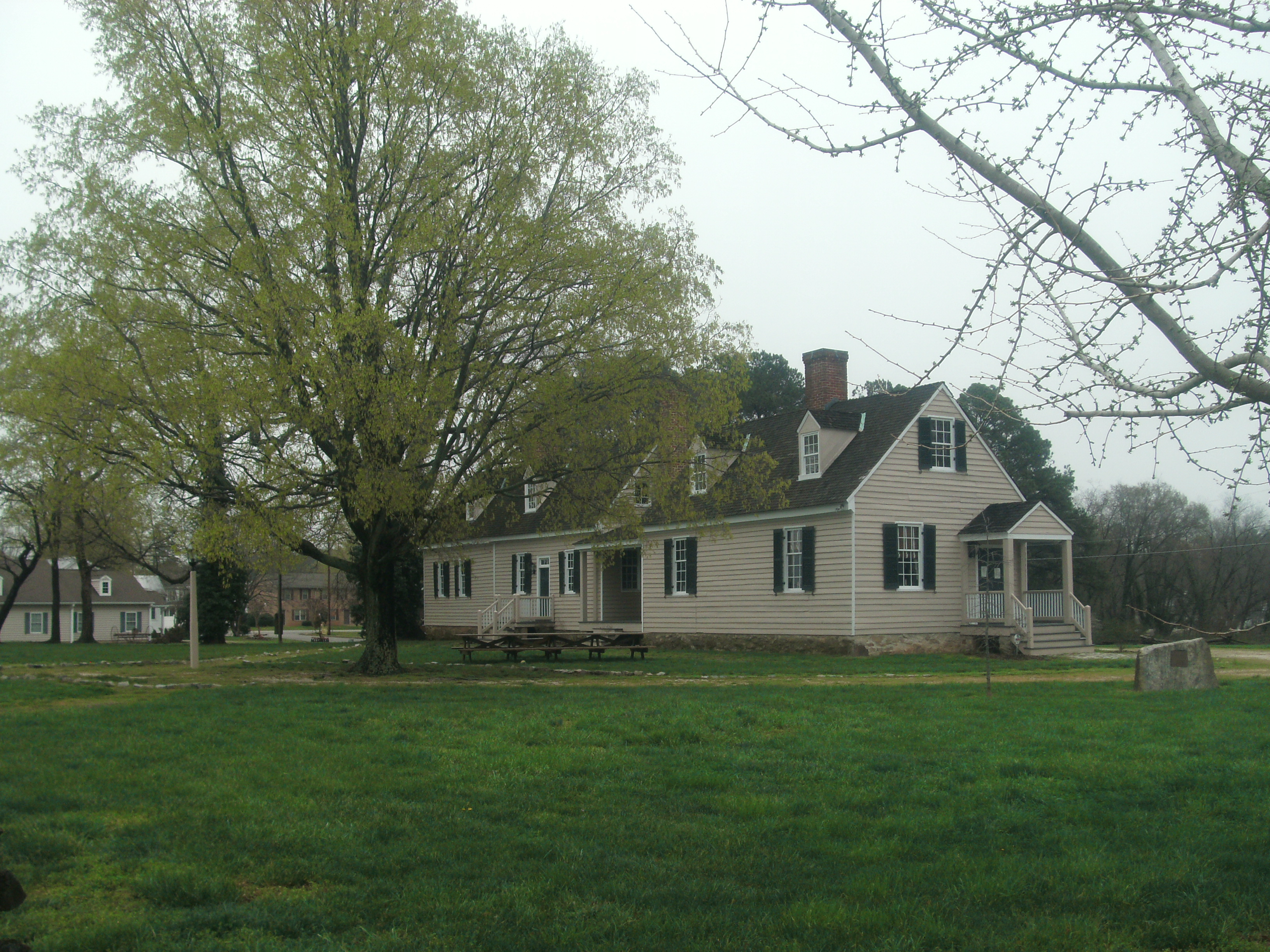
- Schwartz Tavern, April, 2015

- Location within Virginia Location within the United States
- Location: 111 Tavern St., Blackstone, Virginia
- Coordinates: 37°4′54″N 77°59′46″W
- Area: less than one acre
- Built: c. 1798
- Architectural style: Colonial, Federal
- NRHP reference No.: 74002140
- VLR No.: 142-0001

Significant dates
- Added to NRHP: June 28, 1974
- Designated VLR: June 18, 1974

Schwartz Tavern is a historic inn and tavern located at Blackstone, Nottoway County, Virginia. The original section was built about 1798, with two additions made by 1840. It measures 99 feet long in three sections, with the middle block the oldest. The interior features Federal style decorative details and paneling. It is Blackstone's oldest building.

The tavern has been restored and is open for tours.

It was listed on the National Register of Historic Places in 1974.
