= Nottoway, Virginia =

Census-designated place in Virginia, US

Coordinates: 37°07′25″N 78°04′19″W

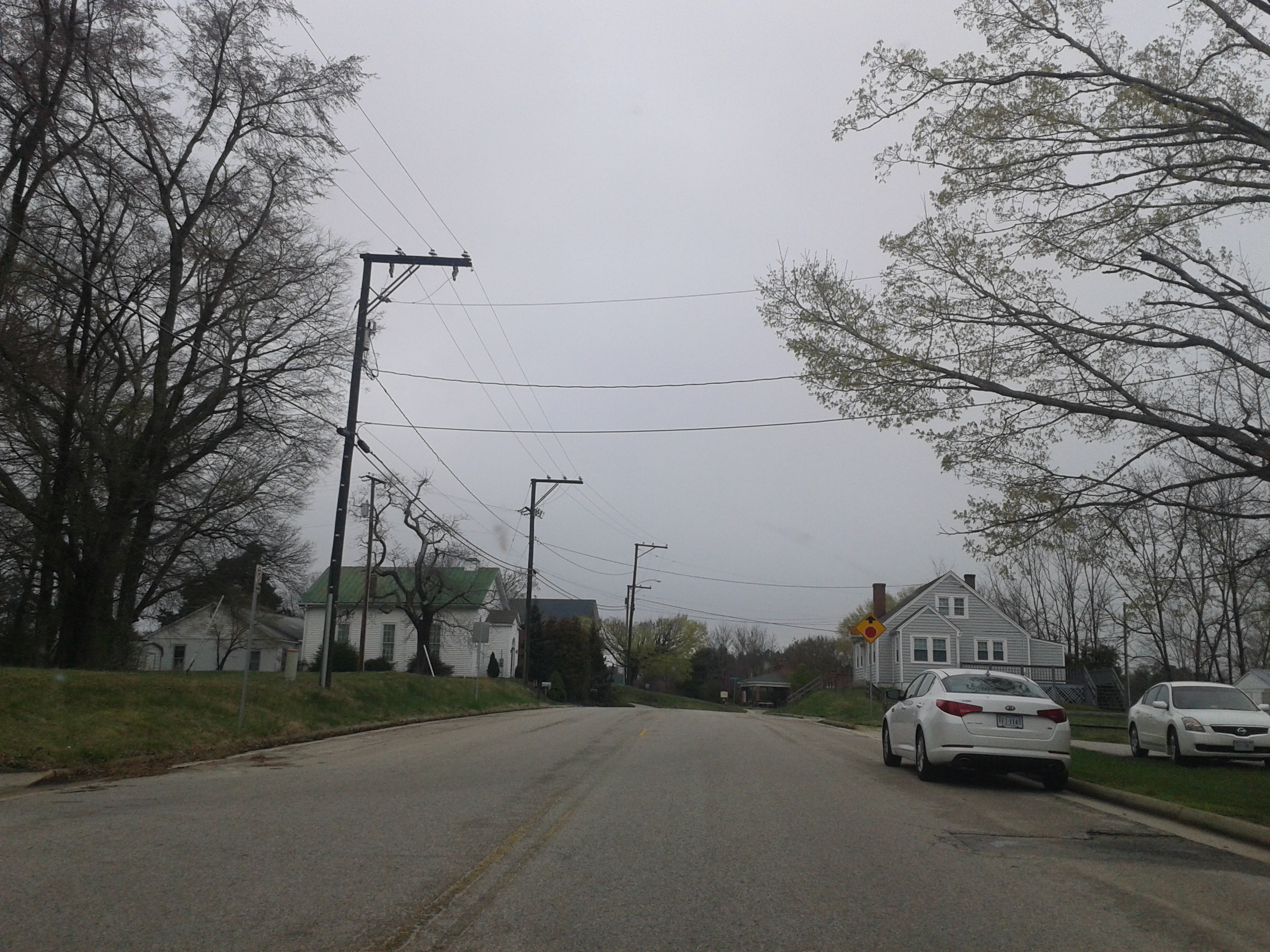
Street scene in Nottoway

Nottoway, or Nottoway Court House, is a census-designated place (CDP) in and the county seat of Nottoway County, Virginia, United States. The population at the time of the 2010 Census was 84. This had decreased to 63 by the 2020 Census.

Nottoway was originally known as Lewistown. Nottoway was a stop on the Southside Railroad in the mid-nineteenth Century. This became the Atlantic, Mississippi and Ohio Railroad in 1870 and then a line in the Norfolk and Western Railway and now the Norfolk Southern Railway.

Since desegregation, the village's public high school now serves the entire county's population.

The Nottoway County Courthouse was listed on the National Register of Historic Places in 1973.

== Demographics ==
Historical population
Census	Pop.	Note	%±
2020	63		—
U.S. Decennial Census; 2010 2020

Nottoway County Courthouse was first listed as a census designated place in the 2010 U.S. census.
