= Nottoway County Courthouse =

Historic courthouse in Virginia, US

- U.S. National Register of Historic Places
- Virginia Landmarks Register
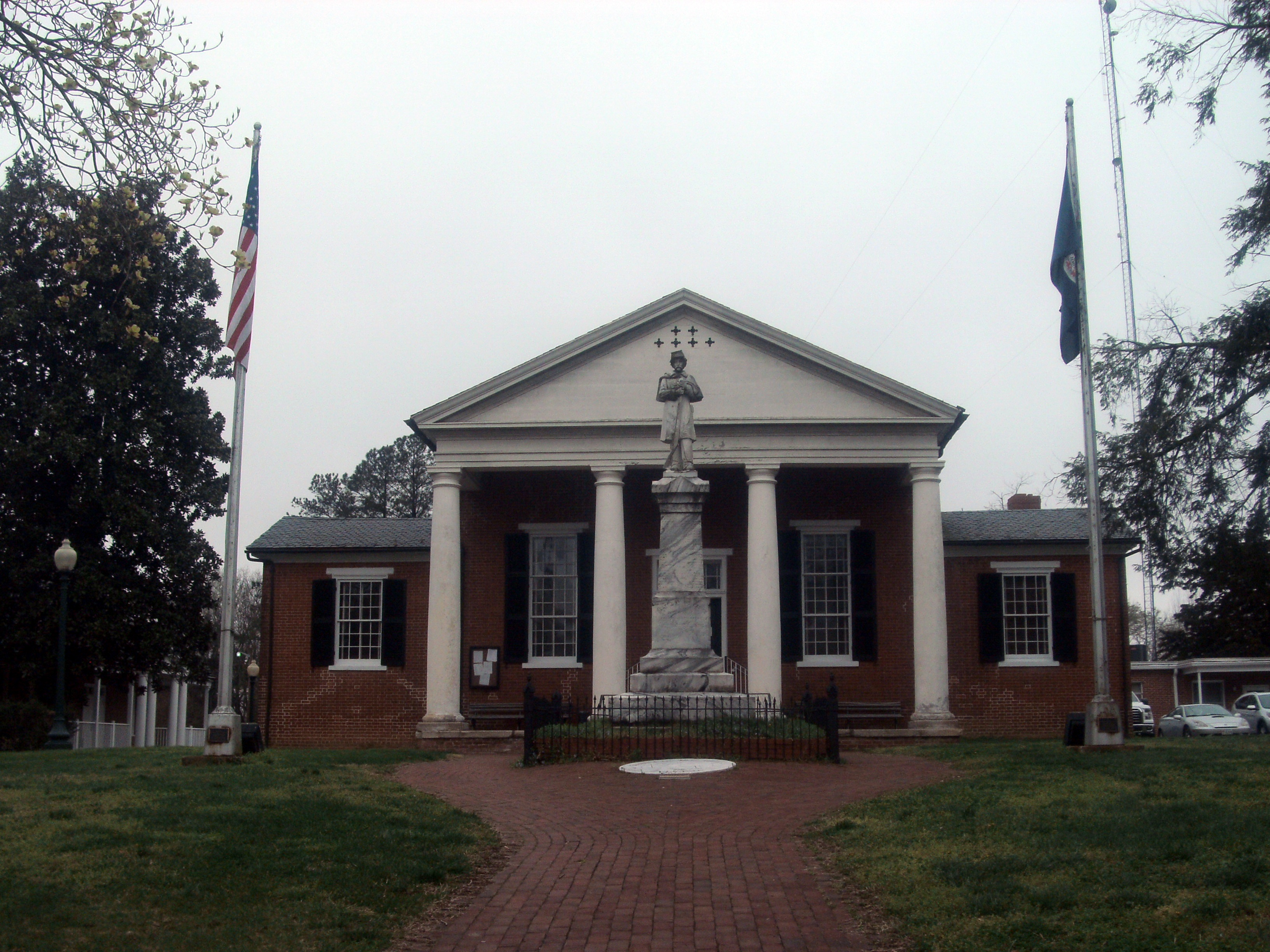
- Nottoway County Courthouse, April, 2015

- Location within Virginia Location within the United States
- Interactive map showing the location of Nottoway County Courthhouse
- Location: Off U.S. 460 on VA 625, Nottoway, Virginia
- Coordinates: 37°7′41″N 78°4′48″W
- Area: less than one acre
- Built: 1843
- Built by: Ellington, Branch H.
- Architectural style: Jeffersonian
- NRHP reference No.: 73002045
- VLR No.: 067-0004

Significant dates
- Added to NRHP: August 13, 1973
- Designated VLR: July 17, 1973

Nottoway County Courthouse is a historic courthouse building located at Nottoway, Nottoway County, Virginia. It was built in 1843, and is a three-part Palladian plan building in the Jeffersonian or Roman Revival style brick structure. It has a temple-form main block and features a tetrastyle Tuscan order portico. It has flanking one-story wings.

It was listed on the National Register of Historic Places in 1973.

== Gallery ==
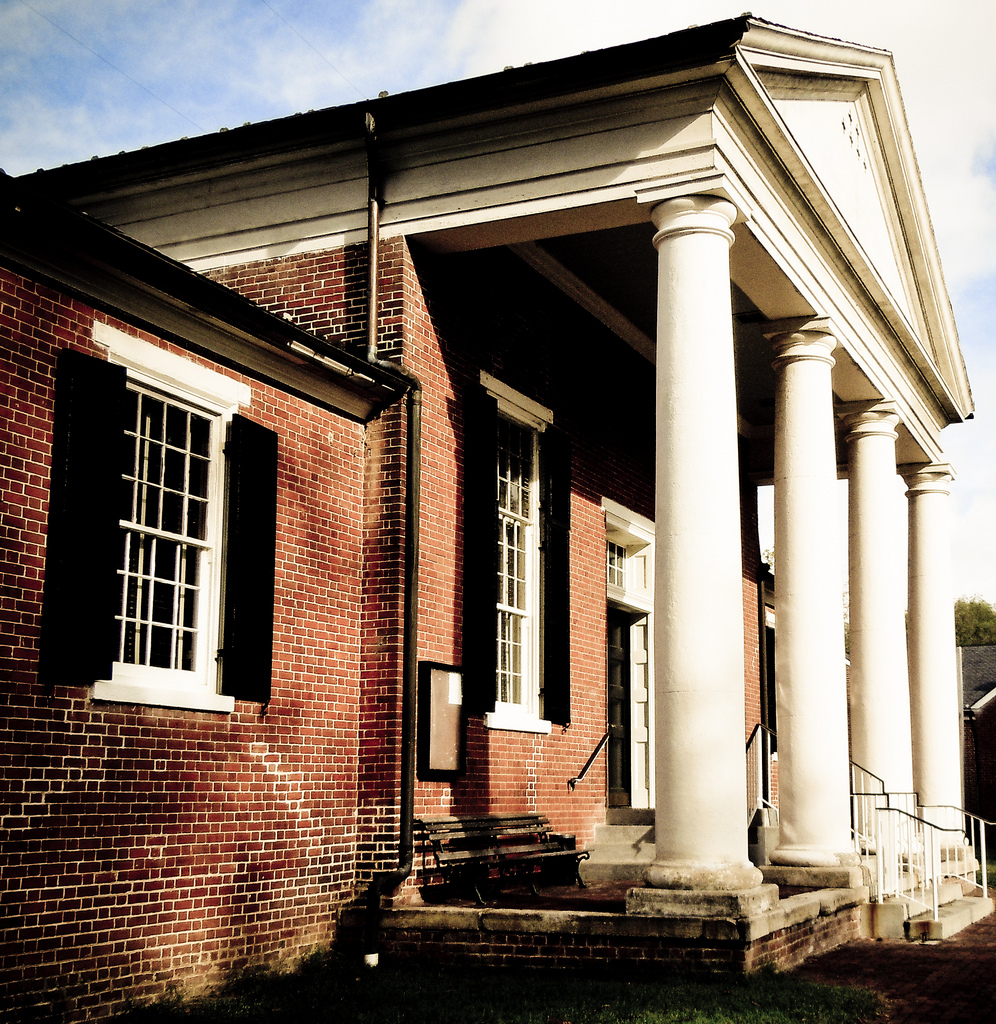
Nottoway County Courthouse, September 2010

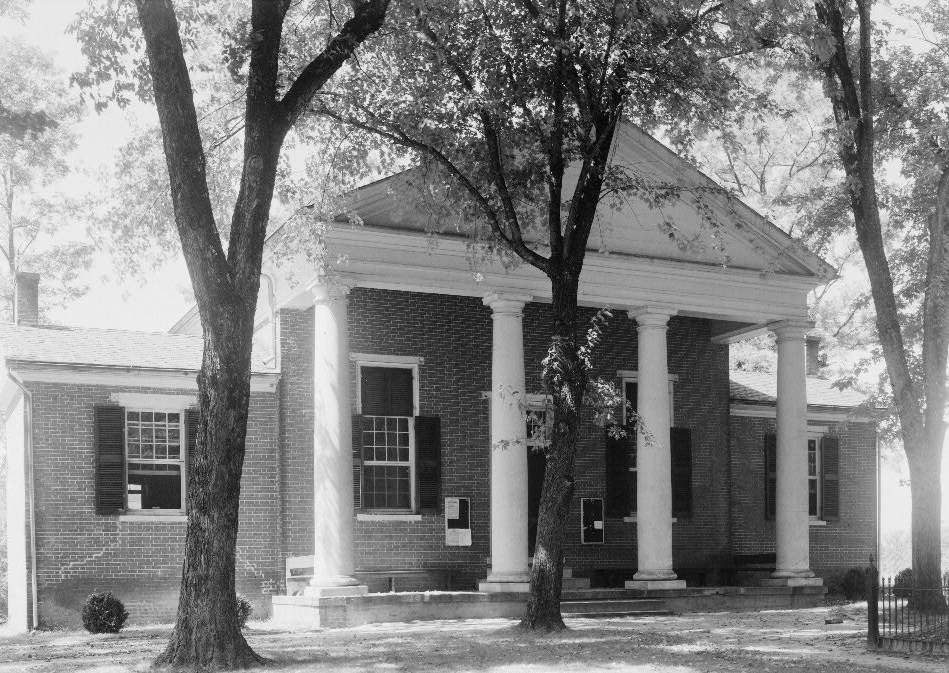
HABS photo
