= Blackstone, Virginia =

- Town
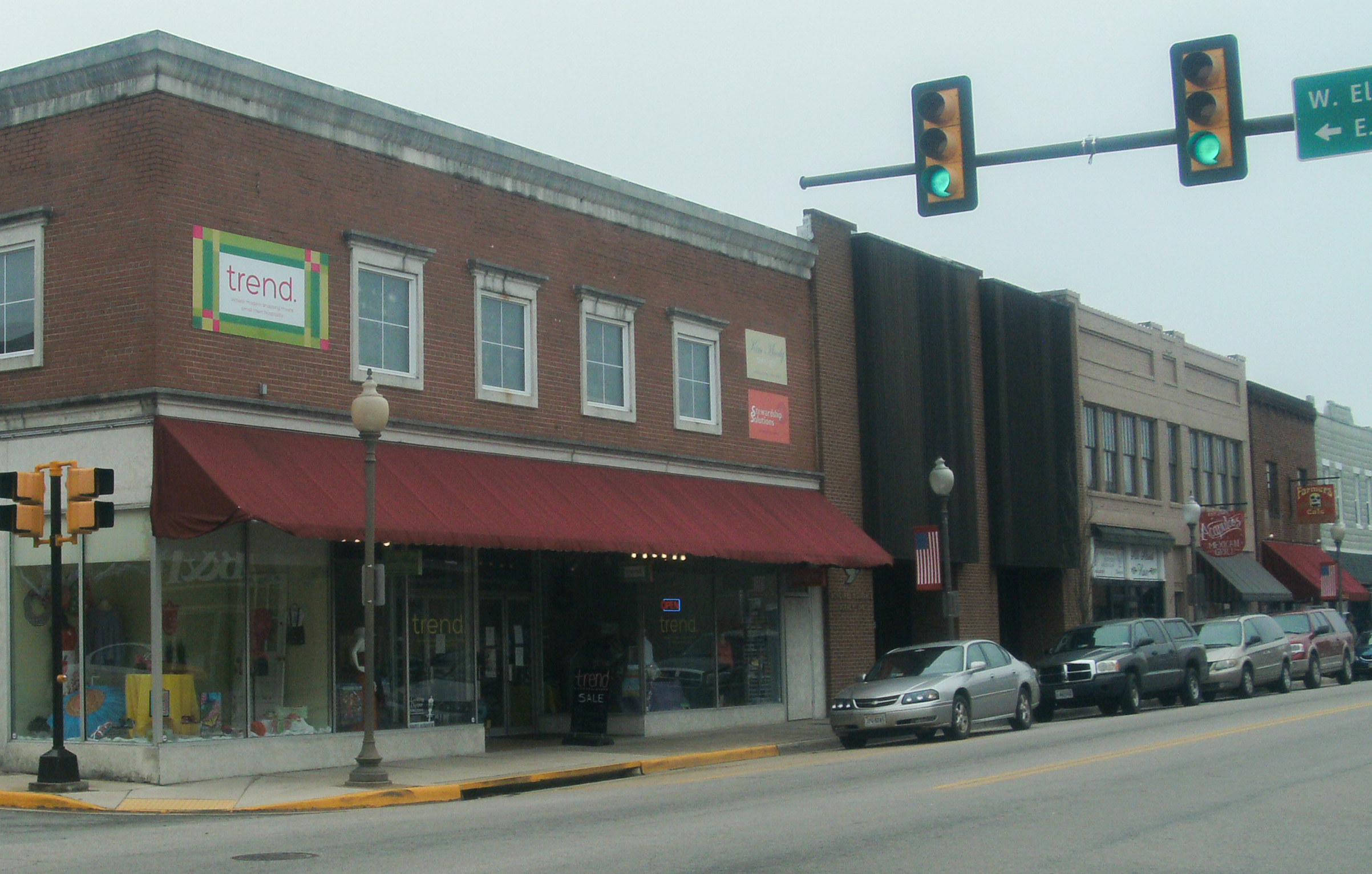
- Downtown Blackstone, April 2015

- Flag Seal

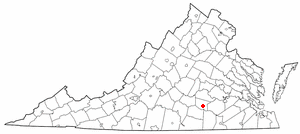
- Location of Blackstone, Virginia
- Coordinates: 37°4′36″N 78°0′5″W
- Country: United States
- State: Virginia
- County: Nottoway

Government
  - Type: Town Council
  - Mayor: Lafayette Dickens
  - Town Manager: Philip Vannoorbeeck
  - Police Chief: Sam Murphy
  - Fire Chief: Zac Beares

Area
  - Total: 4.51 sq mi (11.69 km^{2})
  - Land: 4.49 sq mi (11.64 km^{2})
  - Water: 0.019 sq mi (0.05 km^{2})
- Elevation: 453 ft (138 m)

Population (2010)
  - Total: 3,352
  - Estimate (2019): 3,329
  - Density: 740.6/sq mi (285.96/km^{2})
- Time zone: UTC−5 (Eastern (EST))
  - Summer (DST): UTC−4 (EDT)
- ZIP code: 23824
- Area code: 434
- FIPS code: 51-07832
- GNIS feature ID: 1463528
- Website: Official website

Blackstone, formerly named Blacks and Whites, and then Bellefonte, is a town in Nottoway County in the U.S. state of Virginia. As of the 2020 census, Blackstone had a population of 3,352.

== History ==
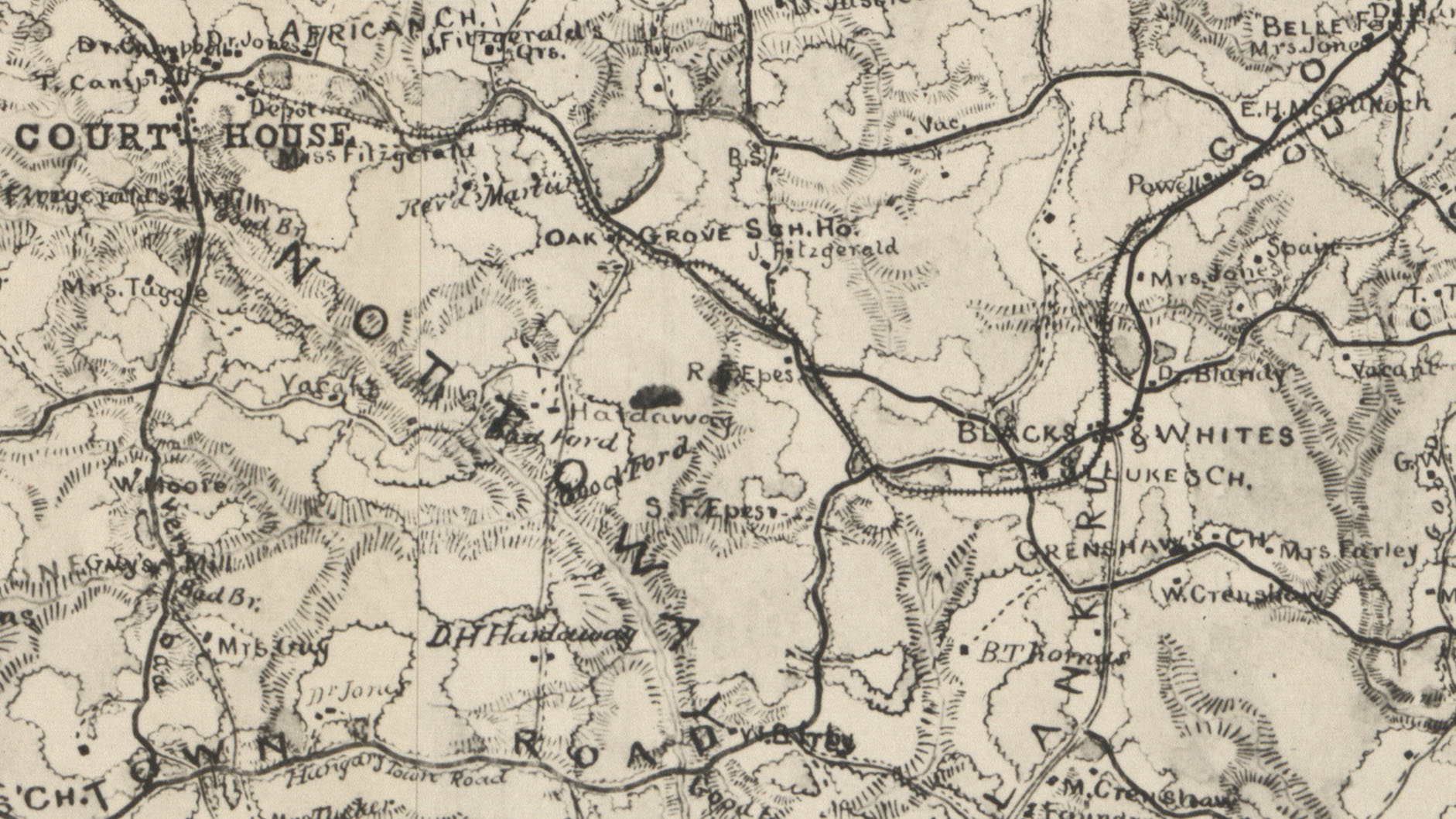
Court House and Blacks & Whites Area of Nottoway County, Virginia, 1864

The settlement was founded as the village of "Blacks and Whites", so named after two tavern keepers, before the Revolutionary War. It was renamed Bellefonte on May 11, 1875, and back to Blacks and Whites on August 4, 1882. On February 23, 1886, the town was incorporated with the name of Blackstone, in honor of the influential English jurist William Blackstone.

The Blackstone Historic District, Butterwood Methodist Church and Butterwood Cemetery, Little Mountain Pictograph Site, Oakridge, and Schwartz Tavern are listed on the National Register of Historic Places.

The town, under its former name, was a stop on the Southside Railroad in the mid-nineteenth century. The railroad became the Atlantic, Mississippi and Ohio Railroad in 1870 and then a line in the Norfolk and Western Railway, now the Norfolk Southern Railway. The town's grid street pattern was laid out in 1874, and the town incorporated in 1888. Its economy thrived as a location for dark-leaf tobacco sales and shipment through its railroad station.

== Geography ==
Blackstone is located at 37°4′36″N 78°0′5″W (37.076661, −78.001302).

According to the United States Census Bureau, the town has a total area of 4.6 square miles (11.8 km^{2}), of which 4.5 square miles (11.7 km^{2}) is land and 0.04 square miles (0.1 km^{2}) (0.44%) is water.

=== Climate ===
Climate data for Blackstone, Virginia (Fort Barfoot) 1991–2020 normals, extremes 1972–present
Month	Jan	Feb	Mar	Apr	May	Jun	Jul	Aug	Sep	Oct	Nov	Dec	Year
Record high °F (°C)	81 (27)	82 (28)	89 (32)	95 (35)	95 (35)	103 (39)	103 (39)	103 (39)	101 (38)	97 (36)	86 (30)	80 (27)	103 (39)
Mean daily maximum °F (°C)	48.2 (9.0)	51.9 (11.1)	59.2 (15.1)	69.8 (21.0)	76.7 (24.8)	84.1 (28.9)	87.7 (30.9)	85.9 (29.9)	80.4 (26.9)	70.4 (21.3)	60.4 (15.8)	51.6 (10.9)	68.9 (20.5)
Daily mean °F (°C)	37.4 (3.0)	40.0 (4.4)	47.1 (8.4)	56.9 (13.8)	65.5 (18.6)	73.6 (23.1)	77.8 (25.4)	76.0 (24.4)	69.8 (21.0)	58.5 (14.7)	48.1 (8.9)	40.6 (4.8)	57.6 (14.2)
Mean daily minimum °F (°C)	26.5 (−3.1)	28.2 (−2.1)	35.0 (1.7)	44.1 (6.7)	54.4 (12.4)	63.1 (17.3)	67.8 (19.9)	66.1 (18.9)	59.3 (15.2)	46.5 (8.1)	35.8 (2.1)	29.7 (−1.3)	46.4 (8.0)
Record low °F (°C)	−13 (−25)	−9 (−23)	6 (−14)	11 (−12)	29 (−2)	37 (3)	41 (5)	41 (5)	35 (2)	22 (−6)	8 (−13)	−1 (−18)	−13 (−25)
Average precipitation inches (mm)	3.74 (95)	2.86 (73)	4.12 (105)	3.69 (94)	4.35 (110)	4.28 (109)	4.43 (113)	4.20 (107)	4.39 (112)	3.90 (99)	3.13 (80)	3.75 (95)	46.84 (1,190)
Average snowfall inches (cm)	1.5 (3.8)	0.6 (1.5)	0.4 (1.0)	0.0 (0.0)	0.0 (0.0)	0.0 (0.0)	0.0 (0.0)	0.0 (0.0)	0.0 (0.0)	0.0 (0.0)	0.0 (0.0)	0.8 (2.0)	3.3 (8.4)
Average precipitation days (≥ 0.01 in)	9.1	8.1	9.2	8.8	10.4	9.0	9.5	8.5	7.9	7.6	7.8	9.4	105.3
Average snowy days (≥ 0.1 in)	0.7	0.5	0.1	0.0	0.0	0.0	0.0	0.0	0.0	0.0	0.0	0.4	1.7
Source: NOAA

== Demographics ==
Historical population
Census	Pop.	Note	%±
1890	580		—
1900	585		0.9%
1910	1,486		154.0%
1920	1,497		0.7%
1930	1,772		18.4%
1940	2,699		52.3%
1950	3,536		31.0%
1960	3,659		3.5%
1970	3,412		−6.8%
1980	3,624		6.2%
1990	3,497		−3.5%
2000	3,675		5.1%
2010	3,621		−1.5%
2020	3,352		−7.4%
U.S. Decennial Census

=== 2020 census ===
As of the 2020 census, Blackstone had a population of 3,352. The median age was 43.4 years. 21.6% of residents were under the age of 18 and 23.4% of residents were 65 years of age or older. For every 100 females there were 88.1 males, and for every 100 females age 18 and over there were 83.1 males age 18 and over.

0.0% of residents lived in urban areas, while 100.0% lived in rural areas.

There were 1,396 households in Blackstone, of which 26.5% had children under the age of 18 living in them. Of all households, 29.9% were married-couple households, 21.2% were households with a male householder and no spouse or partner present, and 40.6% were households with a female householder and no spouse or partner present. About 38.8% of all households were made up of individuals and 19.0% had someone living alone who was 65 years of age or older.

There were 1,643 housing units, of which 15.0% were vacant. The homeowner vacancy rate was 2.2% and the rental vacancy rate was 8.3%.

Racial composition as of the 2020 census
Race	Number	Percent
White	1,432	42.7%
Black or African American	1,590	47.4%
American Indian and Alaska Native	18	0.5%
Asian	36	1.1%
Native Hawaiian and Other Pacific Islander	0	0.0%
Some other race	97	2.9%
Two or more races	179	5.3%
Hispanic or Latino (of any race)	206	6.1%

=== 2000 census ===
According to the census of 2000, there were 3,675 people, 1,430 households, and 886 families residing in the town. The population density was 811.8 people per square mile (313.2/km^{2}). There were 1,581 housing units, at an average density of 349.2 per square mile (134.8/km^{2}). The racial makeup of the town was 50.23% White, 46.39% African American, 0.03% Native American, 0.71% Asian, 1.88% from other races, and 0.76% from two or more races. Hispanic or Latino of any race were 2.39% of the population.

There were 1,430 households, out of which 29.0% had children under the age of 18 living with them, 38.7% were married couples living together, 18.3% had a female householder with no husband present, and 38.0% were non-families. 33.6% of all households were made up of individuals, and 17.6% had someone living alone who was 65 years of age or older. The average household size was 2.41 and the average family size was 3.06.

The median age was 40 years, with 24.3% under the age of 18, 7.4% from 18 to 24, 25.4% from 25 to 44, 21.6% from 45 to 64, and 21.3% who were 65 years of age or older. For every 100 females, there were 81.5 males. For every 100 females age 18 and over, there were 76.5 males.

The median household income was $27,566, and the median family income was $41,520. Males had a median income of $26,419 versus $17,905 for females. The per capita income for the town was $15,562. About 20.2% of families and 26.5% of the population were below the poverty line, including 35.5% of those under age 18 and 31.7% of those age 65 or over.

== Infrastructure and attractions ==
Nearby Fort Pickett was established by the U.S. Army in 1941 and was a very large training center during World War II. It was closed by the BRAC Commission in the 1990s, and the facility is now the headquarters for the Virginia National Guard. In May 2014 the U.S. Department of State selected Fort Pickett as the site of their Foreign Affairs Security Training Center, which opened in November 2019. After the fall of Kabul during September 2021, the federal government temporarily housed 5,900 Afghan refugees at the facility.

The 2-year Blackstone Female Institute / Blackstone College for Girls also operated in Blackstone for many years. The buildings and grounds were later used as the Virginia United Methodist Assembly Center (VUMAC), drawing 19,000 visitors a year before closing in 2016. The Blackstone shopping district (including a Wal-Mart, an outpatient medical center, and a livestock market) attracts customers from a large three-county rural area. The town received a Main Street designation from the state, and a $1 million downtown revitalization project started in 2008. In 2009 the town opened the $4 million James Harris medical center. The Town of Blackstone also has a regional bus terminal that serves 11 counties. The oldest building in town is Schwartz Tavern, built in stages from 1790 to 1840, now used as a museum. Bevell's Hardware, a local business, no longer displays a giant 58' by 20' (17.7 by 6.1 meter) model railroad layout that had attracted thousands of visitors. The Robert Thomas Carriage Museum, containing 28 restored antique carriages, sleighs, and buggies, was opened in 2007.

== Notable people ==
- Actress Bea Arthur attended Blackstone School for Girls and was active in their Drama program in 1933.
- Bishop James Cannon, Jr., first President of Blackstone College, achieved fame as the leading prohibition advocate in the nation.
- Booker T. Spicely, U.S. Army soldier and victim of a racially motivated murder in Durham, North Carolina, in 1944.
- John A. Tyree, U.S. Navy Vice Admiral and double Navy Cross recipient
- Representative and lawyer James F. Epes
- American football player Robert Jones
- Richmond Dillard Crinkley, Broadway Producer, won the Best Play Tony Award in 1979 for “The Elephant Man.”
