= Nottoway County, Virginia =

County in Virginia, United States

- County
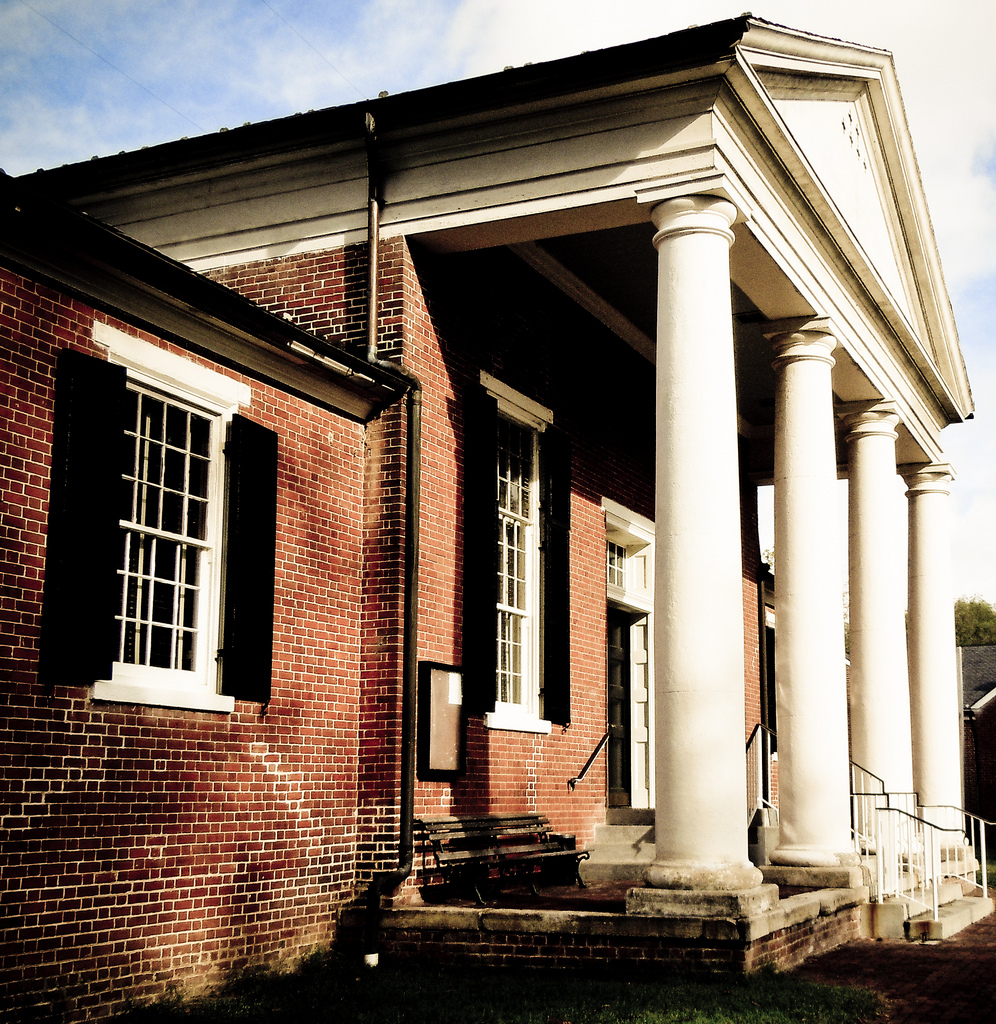
- Nottoway County Courthouse

- Seal

- Location within the U.S. state of Virginia
- Coordinates: 37°08′N 78°03′W
- Country: United States
- State: Virginia
- Founded: 1789
- Named for: Nottoway people
- Seat: Nottoway
- Largest town: Blackstone

Area
  - Total: 316 sq mi (820 km^{2})
  - Land: 314 sq mi (810 km^{2})
  - Water: 1.7 sq mi (4.4 km^{2}) 0.5%

Population (2020)
  - Total: 15,642
  - Estimate (2025): 15,796 ▲
  - Density: 49.8/sq mi (19.2/km^{2})
- Time zone: UTC−5 (Eastern)
  - Summer (DST): UTC−4 (EDT)
- Congressional district: 5th
- Website: www.nottoway.org

Nottoway County is a county located in the Commonwealth of Virginia. As of the 2020 census, the population was 15,642. Its county seat is Nottoway. It is situated south of the James River, thus making it a part of the Southside Virginia Region.

== History ==
Prior to the arrival of European settlers, the land that would become Nottoway County was inhabited by American Indians of the Nadowa tribe, an Iroquoian people. They lived along the county's only river, the Nadowa, an Algonquian word meaning rattlesnake, and became associated with the area they inhabited. The name was anglicized to 'Nottoway', and from this the name of the county was derived. The people of this "Nottoway Tribe", now numbering between 400 and 500, call themselves Cheroenhaka, meaning "People At The Fork Of The Stream".

Before the county established its own government, it was known as Nottoway Parish, a district of Amelia County. Nottoway Parish became Nottoway County by legislative act in 1788. The county contained numerous early crossroads settlements connecting the new western frontier with the population centers of Petersburg and Richmond to the north and east and until recent times owed much of its prosperity to tobacco. First coming to Nottoway in the 1850s, railroad construction and associated industries eventually came to represent a major portion of business in the area. In the 1860 census, 73.2% of the total population of Nottoway County were slaves, the highest percentage of any Virginia county.

One of the county's larger towns, Crewe, owes its existence to the railroad siding established at Robertson's Switch in the 1880s. In recent decades, however, the decline of tobacco, the railroads, and Fort Barfoot (formerly known as Fort Pickett), has presented the county, like much of Southside Virginia, with economic difficulties and led many Nottoway families to seek jobs and homes in Richmond and other prospering cities in central Virginia.

During the American Civil War, the county raised two infantry companies for the Confederate Army, the Nottoway Rifle Guards and the Nottoway Grays, Jeffress' artillery battery, and the Nottoway Company E of the 3rd Virginia Cavalry. Both infantry companies served in the 18th Virginia Infantry Regiment and saw extensive service throughout the Eastern Theatre, most notably at the Battle of Gettysburg where they were at the forefront of Pickett's Charge. The famous charge was disastrous to the 18th Virginia, and many families in Nottoway County lost relatives in it. The 18th Regiment's colors were captured at the stone wall on Cemetery Ridge and are now displayed in Gettysburg. The county was the site of only one major skirmish, the "Battle of the Grove," which was fought near Blackstone (then known as Blacks and Whites) for control of the rail line that supplied General Robert E. Lee's Army of Northern Virginia, then entrenched around Petersburg and Richmond. The war's last major battle before the surrender at Appomattox was fought at Sayler's Creek, west of Burkeville near the Nottaway County line, on April 6, 1865 (see article on Burkeville).

Nottoway's three towns were incorporated in the late 1800s, all along what was to become the U.S. Highway 460/Norfolk Southern Railway corridor that bisects the county. Industrialization blossomed at the same time, exploiting the ease of moving raw materials in and finished products out. County manufacturing often utilized the area's abundant natural resources, particularly agricultural products, timber, and wood products.

The 20th century saw an increase in the diversification of the county in its agricultural, industrial and commercial sectors. During this time, major state and federal facilities were created in the county. Fort Pickett, established at the outbreak of World War II, is now headquarters of the Virginia National Guard.

== Geography ==
According to the U.S. Census Bureau, the county has a total area of 316 square miles (820 km^{2}), of which 314 square miles (810 km^{2}) is land and 1.7-square-mile (4.4 km^{2}) (0.5%) is water.

=== Adjacent counties ===
- Amelia County - north
- Dinwiddie County - east
- Brunswick County - southeast
- Lunenberg County - south
- Prince Edward County - west

=== Major highways ===
- US 360 (W & E Patrick Henry Hwy; joins with US 460 in Burkeville)
- US 460 (W & E Colonial Trail Hwy. US Bus 460 goes through Nottoway Courthouse to Blackstone. US 460 bypasses Blackstone and unites before the junction of SR 153)
- SR 40 (S. Main St & Dinwiddie Ave in Blackstone, Kenbridge Rd, Darvills Rd)
- SR 46 (Christianna Hwy)
- SR 49 (Watsons Wood Rd N of Crewe, unites with US 460 in Crewe, The Falls Rd S of Crewe)
- SR 153 (Rocky Hill Rd)
- SR 307 (Holly Farms Rd)

== Demographics ==
Historical population
| Census | Pop. | Note | %± |
|---|---|---|---|
| 1800 | 9,401 | | — |
| 1810 | 9,278 | | −1.3% |
| 1820 | 9,658 | | 4.1% |
| 1830 | 10,130 | | 4.9% |
| 1840 | 9,719 | | −4.1% |
| 1850 | 8,437 | | −13.2% |
| 1860 | 8,836 | | 4.7% |
| 1870 | 9,291 | | 5.1% |
| 1880 | 11,156 | | 20.1% |
| 1890 | 11,582 | | 3.8% |
| 1900 | 12,366 | | 6.8% |
| 1910 | 13,462 | | 8.9% |
| 1920 | 14,161 | | 5.2% |
| 1930 | 14,866 | | 5.0% |
| 1940 | 15,556 | | 4.6% |
| 1950 | 15,479 | | −0.5% |
| 1960 | 15,141 | | −2.2% |
| 1970 | 14,260 | | −5.8% |
| 1980 | 14,666 | | 2.8% |
| 1990 | 14,993 | | 2.2% |
| 2000 | 15,725 | | 4.9% |
| 2010 | 15,853 | | 0.8% |
| 2020 | 15,642 | | −1.3% |
| 2025 (est.) | 15,796 | ▲ | 1.0% |
U.S. Decennial Census; 1790-1960 1900-1990; 1990-2000 2010 2020

=== Racial and ethnic composition ===
Nottoway County, Virginia – Racial and ethnic composition Note: the US Census treats Hispanic/Latino as an ethnic category. This table excludes Latinos from the racial categories and assigns them to a separate category. Hispanics/Latinos may be of any race.
| Race / Ethnicity (NH = Non-Hispanic) | Pop 1980 | Pop 1990 | Pop 2000 | Pop 2010 | Pop 2020 | % 1980 | % 1990 | % 2000 | % 2010 | % 2020 |
|---|---|---|---|---|---|---|---|---|---|---|
| White alone (NH) | 8,856 | 8,709 | 8,923 | 8,799 | 8,452 | 60.38% | 58.09% | 56.74% | 55.50% | 54.03% |
| Black or African American alone (NH) | 5,637 | 6,124 | 6,356 | 6,179 | 5,773 | 38.44% | 40.85% | 40.42% | 38.98% | 36.91% |
| Native American or Alaska Native alone (NH) | 6 | 32 | 20 | 42 | 50 | 0.04% | 0.21% | 0.13% | 0.26% | 0.32% |
| Asian alone (NH) | 22 | 45 | 61 | 50 | 64 | 0.15% | 0.30% | 0.39% | 0.32% | 0.41% |
| Native Hawaiian or Pacific Islander alone (NH) | x | x | 2 | 3 | 3 | x | x | 0.01% | 0.02% | 0.02% |
| Other race alone (NH) | 3 | 0 | 13 | 16 | 72 | 0.02% | 0.00% | 0.08% | 0.10% | 0.46% |
| Mixed race or Multiracial (NH) | x | x | 102 | 155 | 455 | x | x | 0.65% | 0.98% | 2.91% |
| Hispanic or Latino (any race) | 142 | 83 | 248 | 609 | 773 | 0.97% | 0.55% | 1.58% | 3.84% | 4.94% |
| Total | 14,666 | 14,993 | 15,725 | 15,853 | 15,642 | 100.00% | 100.00% | 100.00% | 100.00% | 100.00% |

=== 2020 census ===
As of the 2020 census, the county had a population of 15,642. The median age was 43.9 years. 18.7% of residents were under the age of 18 and 20.1% of residents were 65 years of age or older. For every 100 females there were 122.4 males, and for every 100 females age 18 and over there were 126.9 males age 18 and over.

The racial makeup of the county was 55.1% White, 37.2% Black or African American, 0.5% American Indian and Alaska Native, 0.4% Asian, 0.0% Native Hawaiian and Pacific Islander, 2.2% from some other race, and 4.5% from two or more races. Hispanic or Latino residents of any race comprised 4.9% of the population.

0.0% of residents lived in urban areas, while 100.0% lived in rural areas.

There were 5,645 households in the county, of which 26.1% had children under the age of 18 living with them and 32.4% had a female householder with no spouse or partner present. About 32.9% of all households were made up of individuals and 16.5% had someone living alone who was 65 years of age or older.

There were 6,629 housing units, of which 14.8% were vacant. Among occupied housing units, 63.4% were owner-occupied and 36.6% were renter-occupied. The homeowner vacancy rate was 1.7% and the rental vacancy rate was 8.5%.

=== 2000 census ===
As of the census of 2000, there were 15,725 people, 5,664 households, and 3,885 families residing in the county. The population density was 50 people per square mile (19 people/km^{2}). There were 6,373 housing units at an average density of 20 units per square mile (7.7 units/km^{2}). The racial makeup of the county was 57.16% White, 40.56% Black or African American, 0.13% Native American, 0.39% Asian, 0.03% Pacific Islander, 1.01% from other races, and 0.72% from two or more races. 1.58% of the population were Hispanic or Latino of any race.

There were 5,664 households, out of which 29.90% had children under the age of 18 living with them, 48.60% were married couples living together, 15.40% had a female householder with no husband present, and 31.40% were non-families. 27.60% of all households were made up of individuals, and 14.20% had someone living alone who was 65 years of age or older. The average household size was 2.48 and the average family size was 3.00.

In the county, the age distribution of the population shows 22.90% under the age of 18, 8.10% from 18 to 24, 29.30% from 25 to 44, 22.60% from 45 to 64, and 17.10% who were 65 years of age or older. The median age was 39 years. For every 100 females there were 106.60 males. For every 100 females age 18 and over, there were 106.60 males.

The median income for a household in the county was $30,866, and the median income for a family was $39,625. Males had a median income of $28,533 versus $19,718 for females. The per capita income for the county was $15,552. About 15.50% of families and 20.10% of the population were below the poverty line, including 27.70% of those under age 18 and 18.40% of those age 65 or over.

== Communities ==
=== Towns ===
- Blackstone
- Burkeville
- Crewe

=== Census-designated place ===
- Nottoway Court House (Nottoway)

== Notable people ==
- Maurice Anderson, professional football player
- William Hodges Mann, Governor of Virginia from 1910 to 1914, and State Senator, introduced legislation to construct 350 high schools in Virginia and to close 800 rural saloons.
- Peter Randolph (1779 – January 30, 1832) was a United States federal judge.

== Politics ==
United States presidential election results for Nottoway County, Virginia
| Year | Republican | | Democratic | | Third party(ies) | |
| Year | No. | % | No. | % | No. | % |
|---|---|---|---|---|---|---|
| 1912 | 72 | 8.61% | 683 | 81.70% | 81 | 9.69% |
| 1916 | 91 | 12.85% | 608 | 85.88% | 9 | 1.27% |
| 1920 | 154 | 15.79% | 821 | 84.21% | 0 | 0.00% |
| 1924 | 181 | 15.59% | 840 | 72.35% | 140 | 12.06% |
| 1928 | 667 | 40.35% | 986 | 59.65% | 0 | 0.00% |
| 1932 | 277 | 16.58% | 1,348 | 80.67% | 46 | 2.75% |
| 1936 | 260 | 16.58% | 1,297 | 82.72% | 11 | 0.70% |
| 1940 | 373 | 22.28% | 1,290 | 77.06% | 11 | 0.66% |
| 1944 | 472 | 24.46% | 1,453 | 75.28% | 5 | 0.26% |
| 1948 | 486 | 24.76% | 1,004 | 51.15% | 473 | 24.10% |
| 1952 | 1,454 | 51.02% | 1,381 | 48.46% | 15 | 0.53% |
| 1956 | 1,124 | 33.76% | 1,242 | 37.31% | 963 | 28.93% |
| 1960 | 1,319 | 40.14% | 1,882 | 57.27% | 85 | 2.59% |
| 1964 | 2,353 | 52.30% | 2,138 | 47.52% | 8 | 0.18% |
| 1968 | 1,614 | 33.42% | 1,529 | 31.66% | 1,687 | 34.93% |
| 1972 | 2,979 | 68.22% | 1,308 | 29.95% | 80 | 1.83% |
| 1976 | 2,486 | 47.61% | 2,558 | 48.99% | 178 | 3.41% |
| 1980 | 2,813 | 50.13% | 2,593 | 46.21% | 205 | 3.65% |
| 1984 | 3,418 | 59.00% | 2,296 | 39.63% | 79 | 1.36% |
| 1988 | 3,161 | 57.38% | 2,217 | 40.24% | 131 | 2.38% |
| 1992 | 2,610 | 45.45% | 2,411 | 41.98% | 722 | 12.57% |
| 1996 | 2,416 | 46.34% | 2,327 | 44.63% | 471 | 9.03% |
| 2000 | 2,870 | 52.26% | 2,460 | 44.79% | 162 | 2.95% |
| 2004 | 3,303 | 54.78% | 2,635 | 43.70% | 92 | 1.53% |
| 2008 | 3,499 | 50.07% | 3,413 | 48.84% | 76 | 1.09% |
| 2012 | 3,409 | 49.80% | 3,344 | 48.85% | 93 | 1.36% |
| 2016 | 3,712 | 55.04% | 2,829 | 41.95% | 203 | 3.01% |
| 2020 | 4,027 | 56.89% | 2,971 | 41.98% | 80 | 1.13% |
| 2024 | 4,168 | 60.68% | 2,636 | 38.38% | 65 | 0.95% |

== See also ==
- National Register of Historic Places listings in Nottoway County, Virginia
- Nottoway County High School
