= Joynes =

Joynes is a surname, derived from John. Notable people with the surname include:

- Dickie Joynes (1877–1949), English football player
- Edward Southey Joynes (1834–1917), American academic
- Jason Joynes (1979–2024), Australian basketball player
- Nathan Joynes (born 1985), English football player
- William T. Joynes (1817–1874), American politician and jurist
