= Justice Burks =

Justice Burks may refer

- Edward C. Burks (1821–1897), associate justice of the Supreme Court of Virginia
- Martin P. Burks (1851–1928), associate justice of the Supreme Court of Virginia

== See also ==
- Marion E. Burks (1912–1989), judge of the Cook County, Illinois, Circuit Court
