= Drury A. Hinton =

American judge

Drury Hinton

Justice of the Virginia Supreme Court
- In office January 1, 1883 – January 1, 1895
- Preceded by: Edward C. Burks
- Succeeded by: John W. Riely

Personal details
- Born: May 4, 1839 Petersburg, Virginia
- Died: October 10, 1909 (aged 70) Petersburg, Virginia
- Relatives: William E. Hinton
- Education: University of Virginia School of Law
- Profession: Lawyer, judge

Military service
- Allegiance: Confederate States of America
- Years of service: 1861-1865
- Rank: Captain
- Unit: 41st Virginia Infantry

Drury Andrew Hinton (May 4, 1839—October 10, 1909) was a Virginia lawyer, Confederate soldier, politician, and judge. He served on Virginia's Supreme Court of Appeals from January 1, 1883, until December 31, 1894.

== Early and family life ==
His father, Erasmus Gill Hinton, was a banker. Drury Hinton had a brother, William E. Hinton, who likewise became a Confederate officer, then private banker, stockbroker and important financier in postwar Petersburg. Another brother was Dr. Samuel Hinton of Petersburg. After a private education appropriate to his class, Hinton studied law at the University of Virginia until interrupted by the American Civil War.

== American Civil War ==
The Civil War interrupted his studies. In March 1861, Hinton joined the 41st Virginia Infantry of the Confederate Army, and fought throughout the war, surrendering at Appomattox courthouse. At the Battle of the Crater he was in the first Confederate assault to retake the crater.

== Career ==
Admitted to the bar in August 1866, Hinton began a private legal practice. In 1870 he and four other former C.S.A. captains organized the Petersburg Rifleman's Association as a hunting club and society to preserve the Army of Northern Virginia's military tradition.

Elected as the Commonwealth's Attorney and Corporation Counsel for the City of Petersburg in 1872, Hinton win re-election until his election to the Supreme Court of Appeals in 1883. Many of his controversies in office involved the Petersburg Railroad, which the city acquired.

His brother, Captain William E. Hinton Jr., had helped lead the Conservative party to victory in the Petersburg municipal election of 1874. William Hinton then become aligned with the Readjuster Party, won election to the Virginia Senate and represented Petersburg and nearby Prince George and Surry Counties from 1875 until 1879.

When the Readjuster-dominated legislature refused to re-elect the Conservative judges in 1882, one judge Edward C. Burks, because he had succeeded a judge who died in office and thus had only served six years on the high court rather than the normal twelve-year term, contested his removal. With Judge Hinton absent (as a party to the controversy), the newly reconstituted court ruled against Burks as its first act of business on January 1, 1883. J.S. Budd, George S. Bernard and Virginia Attorney General (and Readjuster) Francis Simpson Blair represented Judge Hinton; W.W. Henry, John H. Guy and James Alfred Jones (the deceased Judge Wood Bouldin's former law partner) represented Judge Burks in the legal case.

However, the Readjuster Party lost power, and in 1894, the Democratic Party dominated the Virginia General Assembly and refused to re-elect any of the judges (including Judge Hinton) whose 12 year terms were expiring. His judicial appointment having finished, in 1894, Drury Hinton returned to private practice in Petersburg.
