= Liberty Hall (Forest, Virginia) =

Historic house in Virginia, United States

- U.S. National Register of Historic Places
- Virginia Landmarks Register
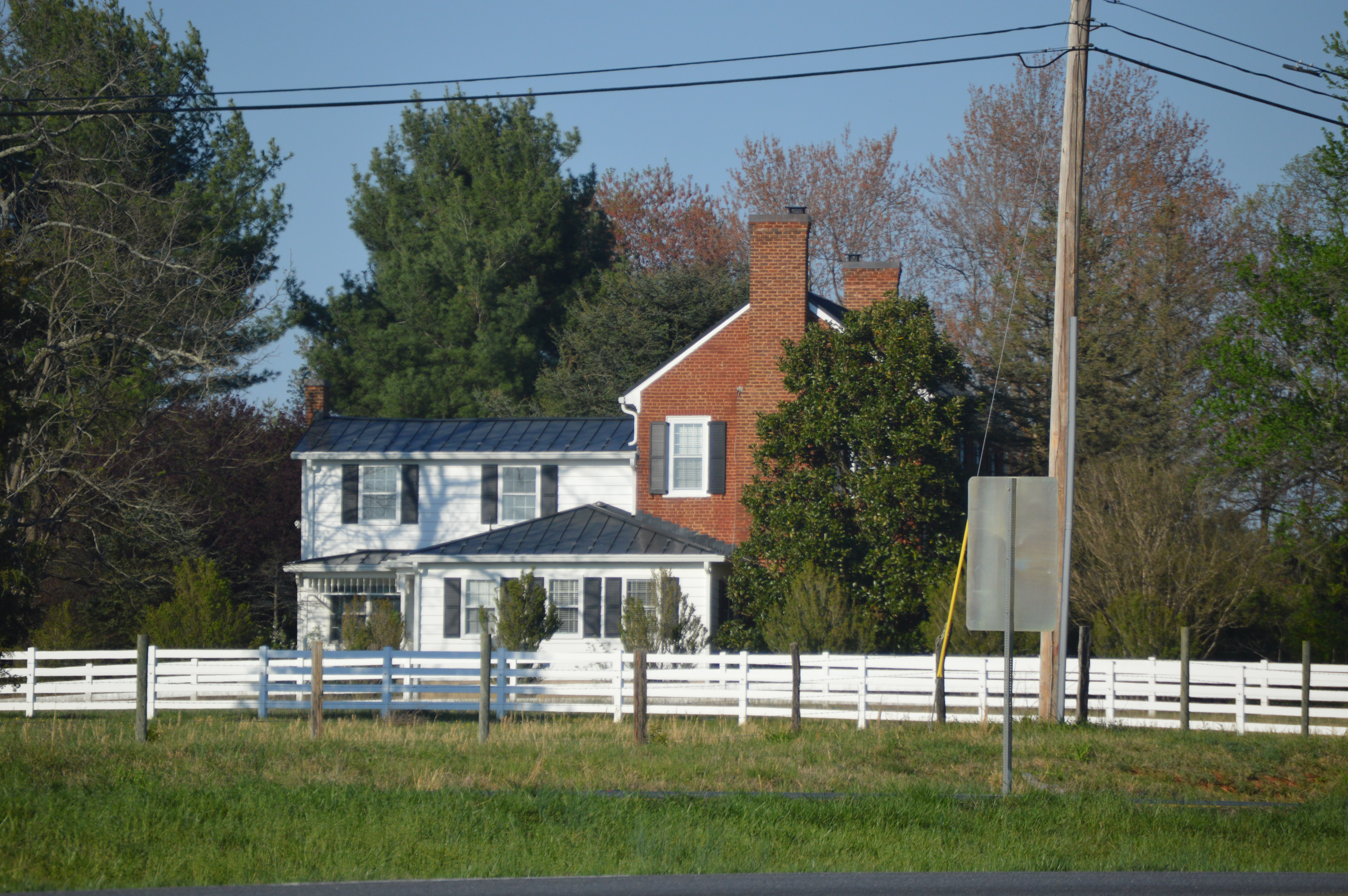
- Western side of the house

- Location within Virginia Location within the United States
- Location: 12000 E. U.S. Route 460 near Forest, Virginia
- Coordinates: 37°18′22″N 79°18′49″W
- Area: 5.2 acres (2.1 ha)
- Built: 1778, c. 1815
- Architectural style: Federal
- NRHP reference No.: 09000613
- VLR No.: 009-0013

Significant dates
- Added to NRHP: August 12, 2009
- Designated VLR: June 18, 2009

Liberty Hall is located in Bedford County in Forest, Virginia. It is one of the very few Federal-Style homes still standing today from the 1700s in the Central Virginia area. It was built in 1778 as a family home. Rutherford B. Hayes and William McKinley once visited the home during the Civil War. Many homes were burnt in Forest, Virginia in the 1800s yet Liberty Hall was spared. The first owner of Liberty Hall was the founder of Augusta Academy which is now Washington and Lee University. Liberty Hall is now a private residence that has stayed in the family for over 100 years. It is listed on the National Register of Historic Places.

== Building/Property ==
The earliest section was built in 1778 and forms the first floor and much of the foundation of the new rear addition. It was originally called Solitary Hall. The two-story, five-bay, brick Federal style front section was added about 1815. It has a modillion cornice, gable roof, exterior end chimneys, and one and two-story frame additions built off of the side and rear elevations. Also on the property is a contributing brick dependency also built about 1815.

The property's foundation and walls are made of bricks, the roof is metal, and has a wood frame. The 1815 brick section gave the house the L shape that it has today. The brick walls of the property are 15 inches (38 cm) thick. In 1778, Robert Alexander had built Solitary Hall, that later his son-in-law, Dr. Read would live in and rename Liberty Hall. There are two chimneys, one in the parlor and one in the dining room of the brick section of the house.

Throughout the years, the house went under multiple renovations for different reasons. Another story was added to the wooden section of the house in the 1970s. In the 2000s, the kitchen and bathrooms were renovated in order to keep up with the current styles and trends at the time. In 2007, the roof was replaced with metal while in 2008 the kitchen and bathrooms were renovated once again. There is a building behind Liberty Hall that people believe served multiple purposes over the years, such as Dr. Read's office, a servant's living area, a chicken house and a kitchen and bathroom with a living area.

== History ==
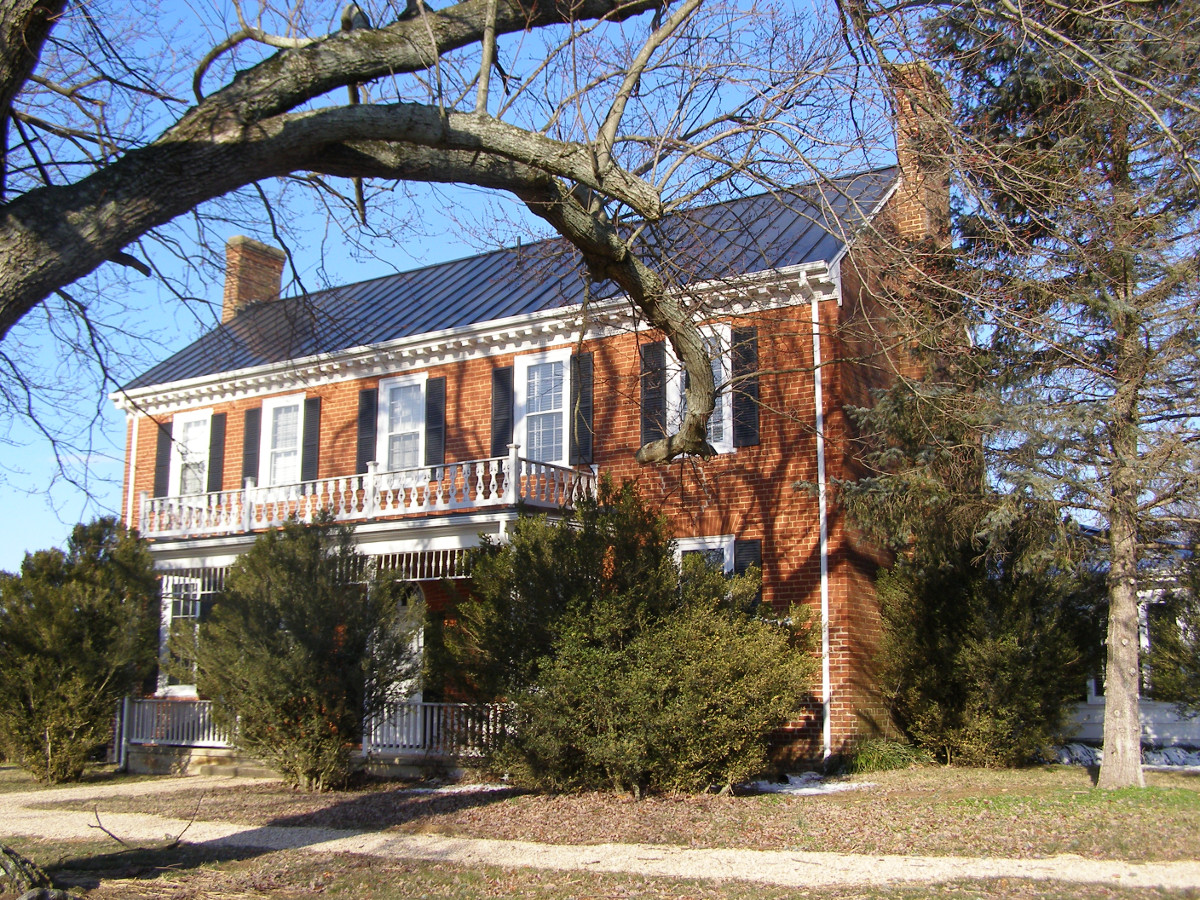
Frontal view of Liberty Hall

William Callaway was the first owner of the land that Liberty Hall would eventually be built on. Callaway was one of the founding members of New London, Virginia and was also a member of the Bedford County court. It was named Bedford County after John Russell who was the forth Duke of Bedford in Great Britain. John Callaway, William Callaway's son, sold a section of the land to Bernard Gaines in 1778. While in the same year, 300 acres of that land was sold to Robert Alexander who eventually built his house on it.

=== Robert Alexander ===
Robert Alexander helped to found New London Academy. He did so by donating a section of his land to the school. Robert Alexander was also the founder of Augusta Academy, which today is named Washington and Lee University. The school was first named Augusta Academy in 1749, then renamed in 1776 to Liberty Hall as an all-boys school. When the school was struggling financially, the name changed to Washington Academy in 1796 when George Washington gave the school an endowment. It was eventually changed again in 1813 to Washington College. By 1865, the college's president was General Robert E. Lee and after his death in 1870, Washington College was renamed once more to Washington and Lee University.

Robert Alexander served during the Revolutionary War from 1772 to 1782 than after the war he served as the first deputy clerk in Bedford County. Later in his life, he moved to Gladys, Virginia after accepting a job position. He served as the clerk there until his death in 1820. Before Alexander moved, he gave his home to his daughter, Elizabeth, and son-in-law, Dr. John Thomas Wyatt Read.

=== Civil War Involvement ===
General David Hunter was a Union Civil War General who had occupied Lexington and then was on his way to Liberty, which is currently the town of Bedford. General Hunter's goal was to destroy the James River Canal, the Virginia Central Railroad, and facilities in Liberty in order to slow down the Confederates. On the way, General Hunter and his army burned the Virginia Military Institute, robbed Washington College, and stayed the night in New London before heading to Liberty. New London at the time was the county seat of Bedford County. On June 16, 1864, William Read, who was the current owner of Liberty Hall, invited General Hunter and his other officers such as Rutherford B. Hayes and William McKinley in for breakfast. This ultimately helped to save the Read's home. Before General Hunter and his army left, they burned down multiple homes but allowed Liberty Hall to stand. After that, he proceeded on his raid of Liberty that occurred on June 17, 1864. "Hunter's Raid" failed since General Hunter panicked when he was informed that a Confederate army was coming to stop him. As a result, he retreated to West Virginia.

== Current ==
Liberty Hall is currently a private residence that is owned by a descendant of Dr. Read and has remained in the family since 1778. It stands as one of the very few Federal-Style houses in the Central Virginia area from the 1700s. There have been no archaeological searches on the land or house to date. Though, it has been known that through the years there have been artifacts found in the yard. The current family works on the farm there which has been running for over 100 years. It is part of the Century Farm Program of the Virginia Department of Agriculture and Consumer Services. It was also recognized and officially listed on the National Register of Historic Places in 2009.
