= Guy House =

Guy House may refer to:

- Guy House (Mansfield, Louisiana), listed on the NRHP in Louisiana
- Thomas Guy House, Mebane, NC, listed on the NRHP in North Carolina
- Burks-Guy-Hagen House, Bedford, VA, listed on the NRHP in Virginia
