= Edward C. Burks =

American judge

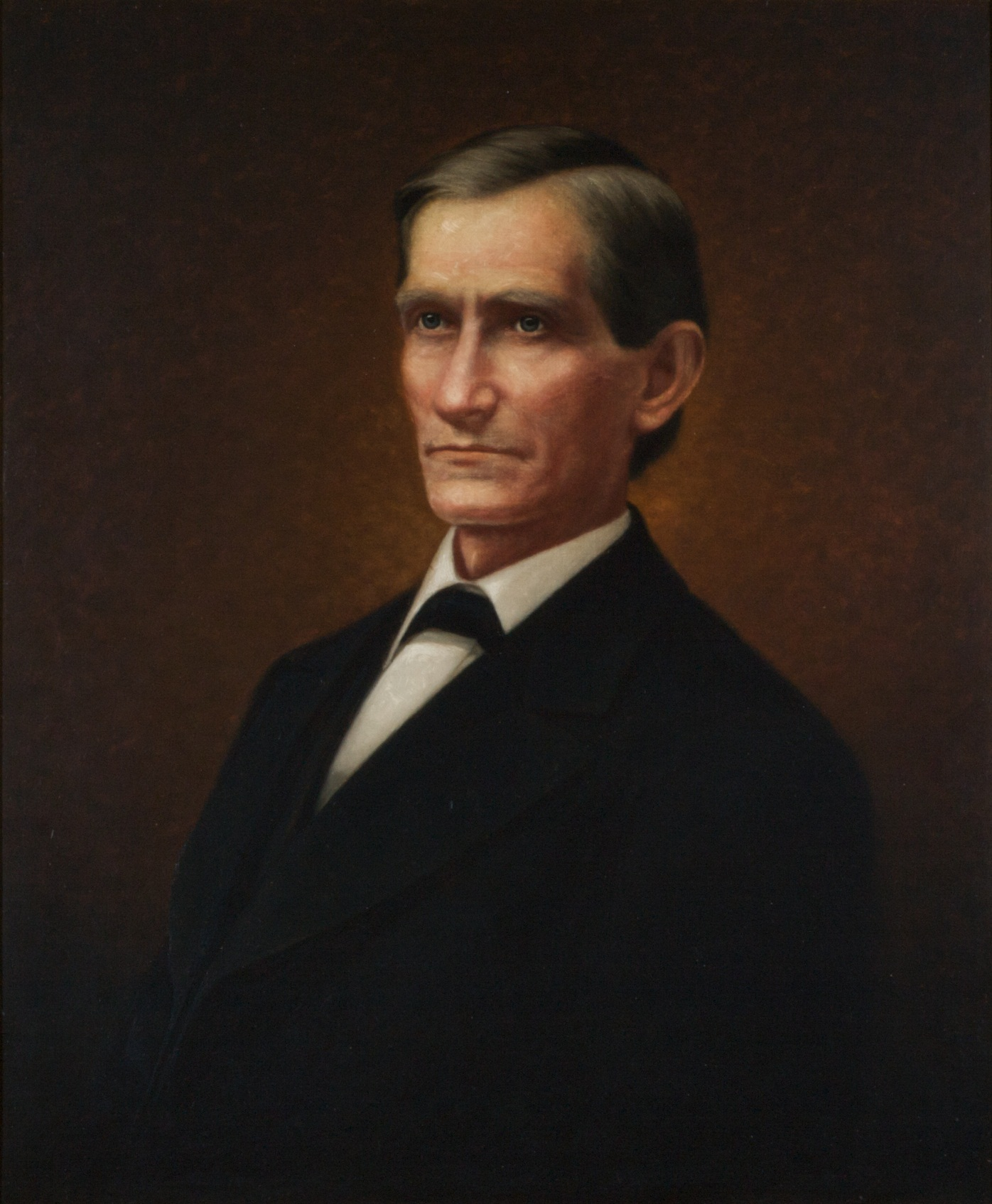

Justice of the Supreme Court of Virginia
- In office January 9, 1877 – January 1, 1883
- Preceded by: Wood Bouldin
- Succeeded by: Drury A. Hinton

Member of the Virginia House of Delegates from the Bedford County district
- In office December 5, 1859 – September 6, 1863 Serving with G.L. Brown, G.A. Wingfield; Alexander C. Jordan
- Preceded by: G.A. Wingfield
- Succeeded by: William M. Burwell

Personal details
- Born: May 20, 1821 Bedford County, Virginia, U.S.
- Died: July 4, 1897 (aged 76) Bedford County, Virginia, U.S.
- Spouse: Mildred E (Bessie) Buford
- Education: Washington College; University of Virginia Law School

Edward Calohill Burks (May 20, 1821 – July 4, 1897) was a Virginia lawyer, legislator and jurist, as well as a relative of several other Virginia lawyers or legislators representing Bedford County. He served as a judge on the Supreme Court of Virginia from January 9, 1877, through December 31, 1882.

== Early and family life ==
Burks was born at the Locust Grove plantation near Sedalia, Virginia in 1821, one of the sons of Martin Parks Burks (a successful farmer) and Louise Claiborne Spinner. (Her Claiborne family was of the First Families of Virginia and she had inherited the estate as the only child of Jesse Spinner and his first wife, Celia Cheatwood). Young Burks attended several private schools when he was a boy, among them, the New London Academy. In 1839, the local Congressman, William L. Goggin, submitted his name to the U.S. Military Academy at West Point, but Burks instead entered Washington College and graduated in June 1841 with the highest honors of his class. In 1842, after studies with Henry St. George Tucker, he graduated with distinction from the University of Virginia School of Law.

In 1845 he married Mildred E. ("Betty") Buford (1822-1873), and their children included Fanny (1848- ), Edward Burks Jr., (1849-1877), Martin Parks Burks (1851-1928), Nora Burks Payne (1854-1915), Margaret L. Burks (1856-1873) and Rowland Burks (1858-1883).

== Career ==
After admission to the Virginia bar, Burks began a private legal practice in Bedford and adjacent counties. By 1850, he owned five enslaved people (a 30 year old woman, 17 year old man and girls aged 14, 10 and 6). Ten years later, Burks owned 11 or 12 enslaved people (6 or 7 adult men, a 15 year old boy, 19 and 17 year old women, as well as 1 and 9 year old girls) in southern Bedford county.

His younger brother Jesse Spinner Burks (1823-1885), who had followed him to Washington College but switched to nearby Virginia Military Institute for graduation, had won election to the Virginia House of Delegates in 1853 and served a term in that part-time position alongside William W. Reese before becoming a captain of the county militia, in addition to operating his own plantation. In 1859 Bedford County voters elected Edward Burks as one of their delegates, and he would win re-election and continue as a legislator and local lawyer during the conflict. Edward Burks did not have a physique strong enough for military service, and initially opposed secession, but drafted the resolution adopted in Bedford County on March 29, 1861, recommending secession. On July 15, 1861, J.S. Burks assumed command of the 42nd Virginia Infantry and after the First Battle of Manassas, received a promotion to command the 6th Brigade of the Army of Northern Virginia before becoming disabled in the First Battle of Kernstown and resigning in July 1862 before the Second Battle of Manassas.

After the Confederate Army acknowledged its defeat, Edward Burks agreed not to own any more enslaved people and received a presidential pardon on December 5, 1865, then resumed his legal practice, joined by his son Martin Parks Burks when he graduated from law school in 1872 and was admitted to the bar. His brother Jesse S. Burks won another term in the House of Delegates, which began in 1875, during which term Judge Wood Bouldin died.

In December 1876, legislators elected Edward Burks to the Supreme Court of Appeals. He continued for six years until 1882 when the Readjuster Party came into power. When the Readjuster-dominated legislature elected Judge Drury A. Hinton to the court, to start on January 1, 1883, Judge Burks contested his own removal after only six years, claiming that all that court's judges were elected for twelve-year terms. Unsurprisingly, the newly reconstituted court ruled against him as its first act of business on January 1, 1883. W.W. Henry, John H. Guy and James Alfred Jones (Judge Bouldin's former law partner) had represented Judge Burks in the action, J.S. Budd, George S. Bernard and Virginia Attorney General (and Readjuster) Francis Simpson Blair represented Judge Hinton. Subsequently, however, Virginia legislators took care to make clear, when electing a justice following the death of a member of the court, whether the term is for the unexpired portion of the former justice's term or for a full term, usually the latter. In 1884, after Burks returned to private practice and Democrats regained control of the Virginia General Assembly (including William P. Burks as one of Bedford County's delegates for two terms), Edward Burks became one of the revisors of the Code of Virginia of 1887, which he completed with Waller Redd Staples and John W. Riely, both of whom also had served as Justices on Virginia's Supreme Court of Appeals. In 1891, Edward Burks won election as President of the Virginia State Bar Association. In 1893, William P. Burks again won election to the Virginia House of Delegates, and was a member of the Democrat-controlled legislature that refused to renew the 12-year contract of Readjuster George W. Hansbrough as the reporter of the Supreme Court of Appeals, instead appointing Edward Burks's son Martin Parks Burks as the official reporter. With Professor Charles A. Graves of Washington and Lee and Professor William M. Liles of the University of Virginia, [one of the] Burks began publication of the “Virginia Law Register” in May 1895, Edward Burks continued editing it until his death in 1897.

== Death and legacy ==
Edward Burks survived his wife by more than two decades, and some of his children also died before him. He was buried beside them in Bedford's Longwood Cemetery. His son and former partner Martin P. Burks would later also serve on the Virginia Supreme Court as well as live in the family's Locust Grove home through the Great Depression. Another generation of Burks would represent Bedford County in the Virginia General Assembly as part of the Byrd Organization: Frank Wellington Burks (1932-1933 and 1936-1945) and Charles E. Burks (1934-1936, then as a state senator representing Lynchburg and Campbell County 1936-1940).
