= Wood Bouldin =

American judge

Wood Boulden
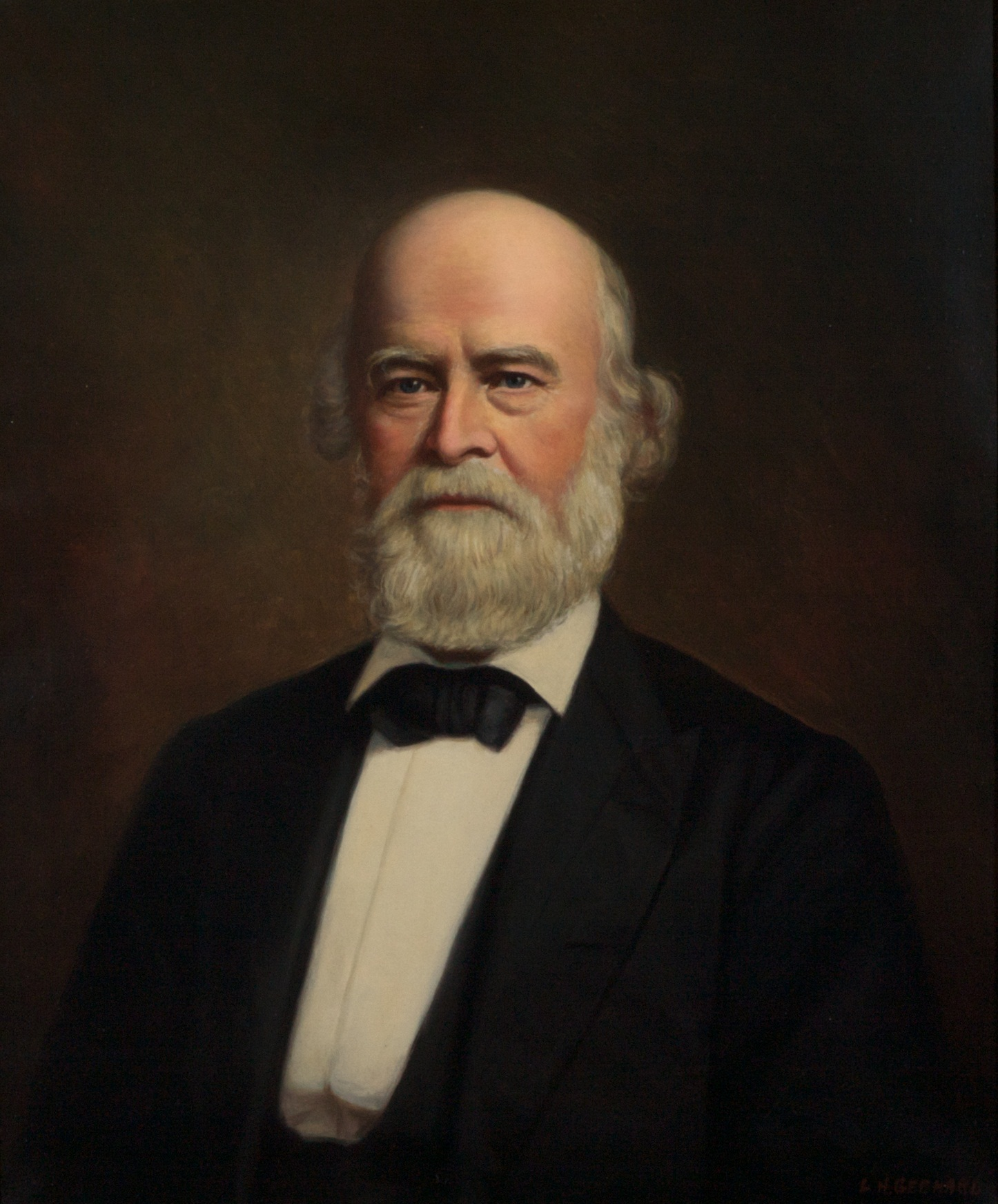

Justice of the Virginia Supreme Court
- In office 1872 – October 10, 1876
- Preceded by: William T. Joynes
- Succeeded by: Edward C. Burks

Member of the Virginia Secession Convention representing Charlotte County

Member of the Virginia House of Delegates representing Charlotte County
- In office December 2, 1861 – March 15, 1865
- Preceded by: S.F. McGehee
- Succeeded by: W.T. Scott

Personal details
- Born: January 20, 1811 Charlotte County, Virginia, US
- Died: October 10, 1876 (aged 65) Richmond, Virginia, US
- Spouse(s): Maria Louisa Barksdale; Martha Baldwin Daniel
- Relatives: Thomas Bouldin(father); Wood Bouldin Jr. (son Commonwealth's Attorney); James Bouldin (uncle), Louis C. Bouldin (uncle)
- Education: Hampden-Sydney College
- Profession: Lawyer, judge

Wood Bouldin, also known as Wood Boulden, (January 20, 1811 – October 10, 1876) was a Virginia lawyer, plantation owner and politician who represented Charlotte County in the 1861 Secession Convention and in the Virginia House of Delegates during the American Civil War (1861-1865). Bouldin then served as a justice of the Supreme Court of Virginia from 1872 until his death in 1876.

== Early life and education ==
Born at "Golden Hills" plantation in Charlotte County, Virginia to the former Ann Lewis and her lawyer (later circuit-riding judge and eventually Congressman) husband Thomas Bouldin, he was named to honor his grandfather Wood Bouldin (1742-1800), who had married Joanna, the aunt of U.S. President John Tyler. His parents had married in 1804, and Ann Lewis Bouldin bore a total of six sons and five daughters before her death in 1823. His father remarried in 1825 and his second wife, Eliza Watkins Spencer, bore four sons. Meanwhile, as a youth, this Wood Bouldin was sent to Richmond to receive a private education from Mr. Turner. He then was sent to Bedford County, Virginia to attend the New London Academy conducted by Rev. Nicholas H. Cobbs (later the bishop of Alabama). After teaching school for a year, Bouldin moved to Halifax County, Virginia and studied law under William Leigh.

Although an ancestor, also Thomas Bouldin, had arrived in the Virginia colony nearly two centuries earlier, and lived with his wife and son William in Elizabeth City County the family's ties to this Southside Virginia area began with Col. Thomas Bouldin (1702-1782) who moved his family including six sons from Cecil County, Maryland to the southern Virginia frontier, and became the first sheriff of then-vast Lunenburg County, then of Charlotte County. His son, this man's namesake, Wood Bouldin Sr. was promoted from second to first lieutenant of the 14th Virginia Regiment and inherited land in Charlotte County, as well as married Joanna Tyler. His brothers (this man's uncles) Thomas Bouldin and Joseph Bouldin operated an ordinary and farmed in Henry County further west, with Joseph Bouldin winning election to the Virginia House of Delegates in 1806. Lt. Wood Bouldin's son (this man's father) won election to the U.S. House of Representatives in 1829, was re-elected once and after missing a term, was elected again, then died on the floor of the U.S. House of Representatives on February 11, 1834, when this man was barely of legal age, and was succeeded by his brother (this man's uncle) James Bouldin. That uncle James Bouldin was also one of the founding subscribers for a new episcopal church building in Charlotte county in 1833, called Roanoke Church, and decades later in 1859-1860 this man would be one of the founding subscribers for a new church building in Marysville (replacing the old building designed by a former assistant to Thomas Jefferson which is now the reminder of the community known as Ca Ira). Meanwhile, in 1838, another brother/uncle, Louis C. Bouldin, began a decades-long career representing Charlotte, Lunenburg, Nottoway and Prince Edward Counties in the Virginia Senate.

== Career ==
After admission to the Virginia bar in 1833, Bouldin moved to Charlotte Courthouse to begin practice, but soon discovered the estate of his father, who died on February 11, 1834, was in financial arrears, in part because of his handling of the large estate of Frederick Ross. His father owned 3 tracts in Charlotte County, totaling nearly 2300 acres, with a law library of nearly 300 volumes, as well as 30 slaves and the same number of horses. In 1840, this man's household of four white males (including his brothers William and Thomas and one boy) also included 13 slaves. Seeking a larger practice, and a new environment after the death of his first wife, Bouldin moved to Richmond in 1842 and entered a law partnership with Robert Stanard, who soon became a Judge of the Court of Appeals.

In 1853 Bouldin purchased a plantation on Staunton River formerly owned by John Randolph of Roanoke, so moved back to Charlotte County to practice law. He also practiced in nearby Halifax and Mecklenburg Counties. By 1860, Bouldin owned real estate valued at $50,000 and personal property, including more than 69 enslaved people in Charlotte County, worth about $6500.

== American Civil War ==
Elected to the Virginia Secession Convention of 1861, Boulden participated actively in the debate, initially stating that he favored remaining in the Union, but also introduced a resolution that any attempt by the U.S. to collect revenue or reclaim military installations in any seceding state would amount to starting a war in which Virginia would "sustain the seceded States". Thus he voted for secession during both the vote of April 4, 1861 (when it was defeated), and on April 16, 1861, which resolution passed. His firstborn son, also Wood Bouldin, a recent University of Virginia graduate, would suspend their legal partnership in order to become a Confederate artillery lieutenant, and served with the Staunton Hill artillery throughout the war.

During the Civil War, Charlotte County voters elected Bouldin to the Virginia House of Delegates, and he served in that part-time position throughout the war. Bouldin served on the Courts of Justice Committee throughout his legislative service, and also rose to become chairman of the powerful Finance Committee in 1863. However, when other legislators early in 1865 proposed to enlist slaves in the losing effort, Bouldin opposed the measure, and decided not to seek re-election.

== Postwar career ==
After the Confederacy's defeat, Bouldin swore allegiance to the United States in May and June 1865, and resumed his legal practice. His namesake son was pardoned by U.S. President Andrew Johnson, but failed to win election to the Virginia Constitutional Convention of 1868, losing to freed slave Joseph R. Holmes. Bouldin moved back to Richmond in 1869 and practiced law with Hunter H. Marshall and his namesake son. He was present to hear the decision of the Virginia Supreme Court concerning the contested Richmond mayoral election of 1870 when the overcrowded balcony collapsed and killed sixty people and injured dozens more. Severely shocked but sustaining no serious injury, Bouldin took a short rest.

In 1872, Virginia legislators elected Bouldin to fill a vacant seat on the Court of Appeals but his judicial career was relatively short, since he suffered a severe stroke in mid-1875 and missed the September term (he attended the November term). His most important opinions both asserted that Virginia law, state honor and good policy required Virginia to fulfill its antebellum obligations.

== Personal life ==
Bouldin married Maria Louisa Barksdale on December 22, 1837 in Charlotte County, and they had a son, Wood Bouldin (1838-1911). However, Maria died in 1839, when their son was an infant. Three years later, Boulden moved to Richmond, then remarried in 1847. His second wife, Martha Baldwin Daniel (1819-) of Lynchburg was the sister of Court of Appeals Judge William Daniel, and bore six daughters (of whom Elvina, Martha, Ann, Alice and Virginia reached adulthood), as well as four sons (of whom Charles Ellett, Briscoe Baldwin and Frank Deane Bouldin reached adulthood).

== Death and legacy ==
Bouldin died at his Charlotte County home on October 10, 1876 and was buried in the family graveyard there. The Virginia Historical Society holds some of the family papers. Others are held by the University of Virginia. His former law office at 14 S. Main Street in Halifax remains, and is a contributing building in the Town of Halifax Court House Historic District. His eldest son and namesake became active in the state Democratic party and would represent Halifax at the Virginia Constitutional Convention of 1902, and play a key role in disenfranchising African Americans.
