= New London Academy (Virginia) =

Historic school in Virginia, US

- U.S. National Register of Historic Places
- Virginia Landmarks Register
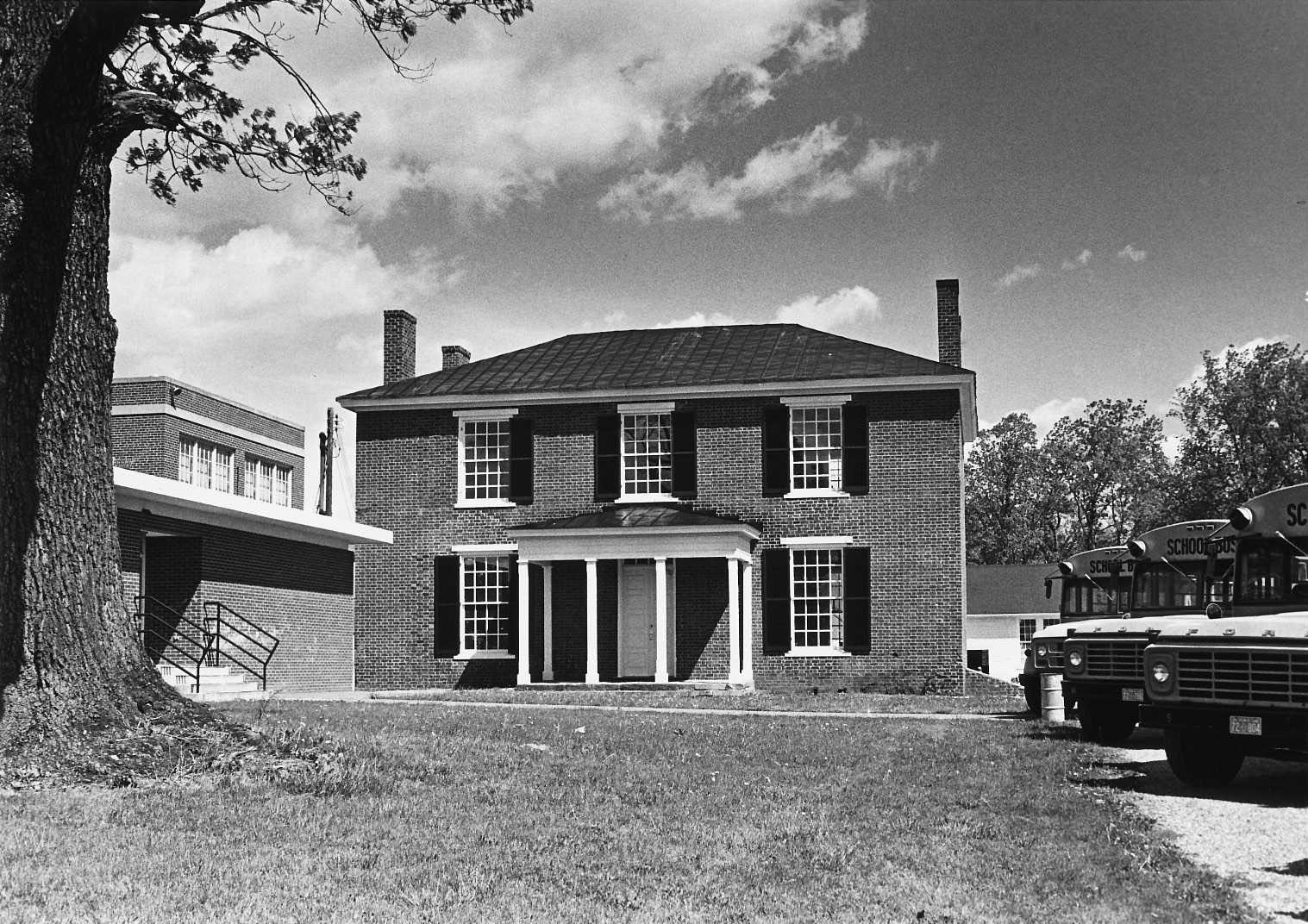
- A black & white image of the front of Alumni Hall, the most symbolic building on campus.

- Location within Virginia Location within the United States
- Location: Near jct. of VA 297 and VA 211, Forest, Virginia
- Coordinates: 37°18′27″N 79°18′20″W
- Area: 18.5 acres (7.5 ha)
- Built: 1837-1839
- NRHP reference No.: 72001385
- VLR No.: 009-0047

Significant dates
- Added to NRHP: April 13, 1972
- Designated VLR: December 21, 1971

New London Academy is a historic school located in Forest, Bedford County, Virginia. The rising of public schools after 1870 and closing down many of Virginia's private schools led New London Academy joining with the new public school districts of Campbell and Bedford Counties while remaining a private institution. This survival led to New London Academy being known as one of the oldest continuously running public schools of Virginia or even the South. New London is set apart from other historic schools in its architecture, notable alumni, like Thomas Jefferson's grandson, and the religious aspects of the school.

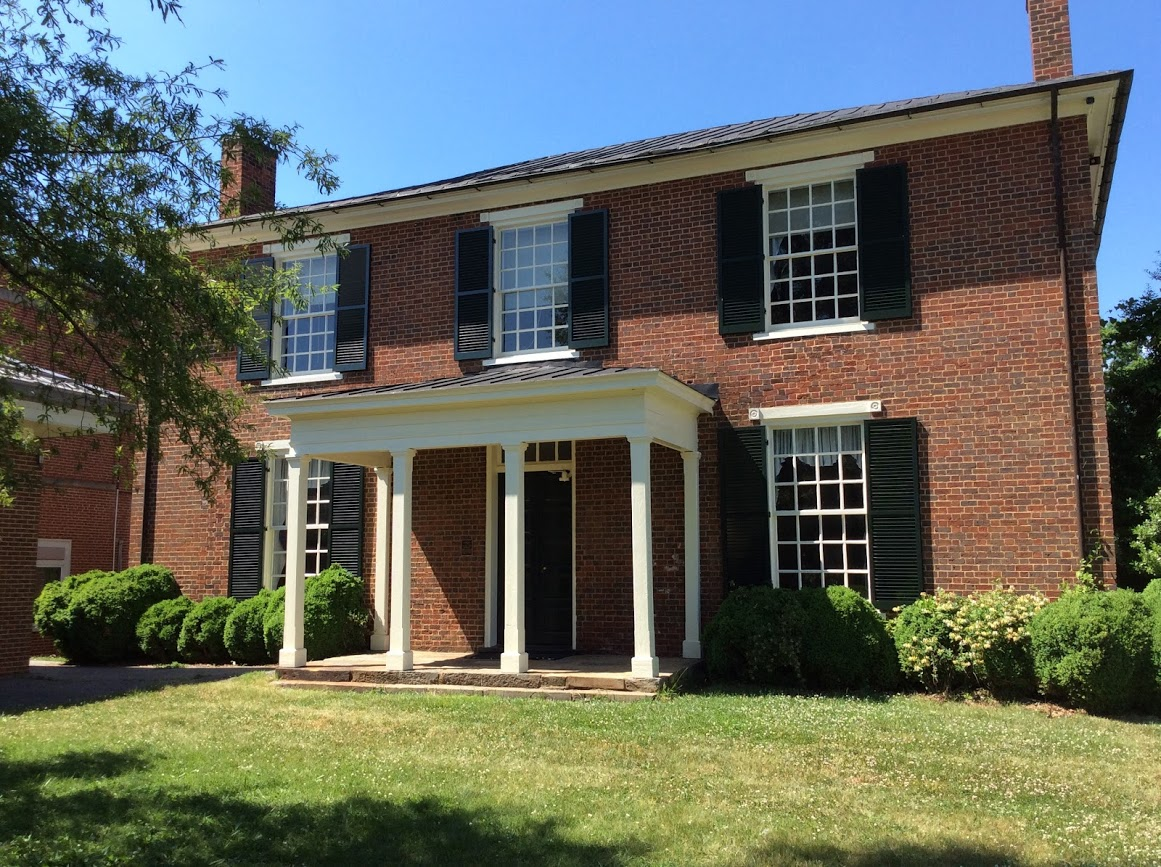
New London Academy

== History ==
In the late eighteenth century, New London, Virginia's hunger for education brought forth the need for proper education. Since the public school system had not been created yet, most schools were tuition-based academies. Thus, the New London Academy was chartered by the Virginia General Assembly in December 1795. With the charter, New London Academy could be seen as more trustworthy. Early in 1775, the academy was established on its present campus near the former town of New London as a classical school for boys. Eventually, the school became co-educational in the 1870s and in the late-1880s became affiliated with the new public school system. New London Academy is the only public school in Virginia to operate under a charter from the General Assembly. New London Academy has gone through many changes structurally, in addition to the changing makeup of the school body. Religion played a factor in the history of the school.

=== Funding The School ===
In the early stages of the academy, the trustees at the academy hosted local lotteries in order to fund operations due to the lack of state funding. The Literature Lottery was an important source for many schools during this time period. New London Academy held its first in 1797–1798 to collect funds for additional buildings and running the school. The lotteries allowed locals to be involved in helping the school. After 1818, the academy was funded by the Literacy Fund, which was a State fund.

=== Evolution of New London Academy ===
Throughout the years of operation, New London Academy's focus on education has changed:

- 1795-1870: NLA begins as a classical school.
- 1870: NLA goes public.
- 1910-1929: NLA becomes an agricultural high school.
- 1964–present: NLA serves as an elementary school.

== The Structures ==
=== Alumni Hall & The Original School Buildings ===
The original campus of 1795 consisted of a two-story, frame building with a hipped roof, interior end chimneys, and enlarged windows. The structure was built in Greek Revival style. There was also a president's house, a large enclosed brick church, and a kitchen. As well as a Smokehouse. Nothing is left of the Smokehouse today. Later in 1839, the original academy building was replaced by a brick carbon copy, now known as Alumni Hall. It was listed on the National Register of Historic Places in 1972. It also used to be connected to Thomas Hall, as described below.

=== Museum (1797 Kitchen) ===
Also on the property is a contributing frame kitchen building. The separate kitchen structure came into existence in 1797 because there was a danger of fire in having a kitchen connected to a bigger building. The original use, of course, was for the purpose of cooking so there is a central chimney that has two openings and hearths on either side of both rooms. Because of the nature of the large fireplaces being useful for cooking, the struggle was to actually heat the building, the fireplaces were much too large to accomplish that need. The kitchen structure has had many different uses. A few uses were as a storage shed and offices for the faculty staff at the academy. In 1890, the structure was used as a music studio. It became a museum around the 60s.

=== Thomas Hall ===
Thomas Hall was built as a boys dormitory in 1916–17, and was named for Principal O. A. Thomas. While the original plans for the dorm indicated that it would be a separate structure, the loan required that the money for construction had "...to be a renovation of, or an addition to, an existing building, not a new, freestanding structure." That building being Alumni Hall, as described above. The principal at the time, Robert Q. Lowry, wasn't disappointed in this. But despite that, he had a perfect conception the "Pavilion" idea for the campus of New London Academy, that goes back to the construction of the original buildings, by Curle and Jones in 1797. The structure was eventually demolished in 1970.

=== Evans Hall ===
Evans Hall was built in 1873 as an exact replica, on the exact same spot of, the Original Principal's House, which burned to the ground in 1867. It was named after Miss Martha Evans, the dorm matron and a teacher at the school. While the approval for the new building was confirmed in 1869, construction did not occur until 1872, after the short stint New London Academy had in the new public school system. During the time between the destruction of the original Principal's House and the construction of Evans Hall, it is unknown where the principals lived. Upon the construction of Evans Hall, which was built by J. W. Mays for $1,095. Evans Hall, though initially a residence for the principal, served other purposes in the latter years of the academy. In the 1880s, a primary school was operated by the principal's wife. In the 20th Century, the principal's residence would be moved to Thomas Hall, and Evans Hall would be used first as a boys dormitory and later as storage and utility. In the 1960s, New London Academy was going through renovations and several buildings were demolished. Despite growing preservation efforts during the 1960s, Evans Hall was destroyed in 1964.

== Religion at New London Academy ==
While New London Academy has never been a religious academy at any point, it has had religious connections. In its initial years, the academy was affiliated with the New London Church or the Academy Church. When Reverend Thomas Brown became the principal of New London Academy, he told prospective parents that he used the New Testament as a textbook, though he took care to note that the school would avoid being linked to any one church denomination. In the mid-1800s, Rev. Nicholas Cobbs, an Episcopal priest, ran the academy, then on weekends traveled through Virginia with a cart and a choir and re-established Episcopal parishes, before resigning his position to become the Episcopal chaplain at the University of Virginia in 1837. Despite the lack of formal denominational links, one of the main goals of New London Academy and many schools at the time was to prepare the students for living completely, internally, externally and eternally. The school also hosted Vacation Bible School, and often let church organizations use the building, as some teachers were members of churches. The students also participated and even ran school chapels and led devotionals for other students. Students would also use religion to get out of class duties. A story noted in The Spirit of New London Academy goes as such. Ms. Coleman, a teacher at the academy was known for her passion for church and her disdain for the Revised Standard Version (RSV) of the Holy Bible. Students wanting to get out of their Latin lessons would ask her about the homily from the Methodist church, which she would gladly recite for the students. They would also ask her thoughts about the newest version of the Bible, the RSV, of which Ms. Coleman had many thoughts. Many of the students of New London Academy went on to be ministers, reverends, or bishops, including John Early (bishop) and Rev. Dr. John Holt Rice. Rev. Dr. George A. Baxter left the academy in 1798 to instruct at Liberty Hall (Forest, Virginia). Cobbs, school principal (1824–1830), would in 1844 be elected Bishop by the Episcopal Diocese of Alabama.

== Notable alumni ==
- Wood Boulden (1811–1876) - American jurist.
- Cabell Breckinridge (1788–1823) - Kentucky politician.
- Edward C. Burks (1821–1897) - American jurist.
- W. Harrison Daniel (1922–2013) - American historian.
- John Early (bishop) (1786–1873) - Bishop, Methodist Episcopal Church, South.
- Francis W. Eppes (1801–1881) - Prominent planter and maternal grandson of Thomas Jefferson.
- John Goode Jr. (1829–1909) - Virginia Congressman, U.S. Solicitor General.
- Gordon Henry White Jr. (1921–1944) - American army sergeant, killed with fellow "Bedford Boys" on D-Day.

== Notable Patrons ==
- Thomas Jefferson (1743–1846) - An honorable supporter of New London Academy and family to attendees.
