= Adele Williams =

American artist (1868–1952)

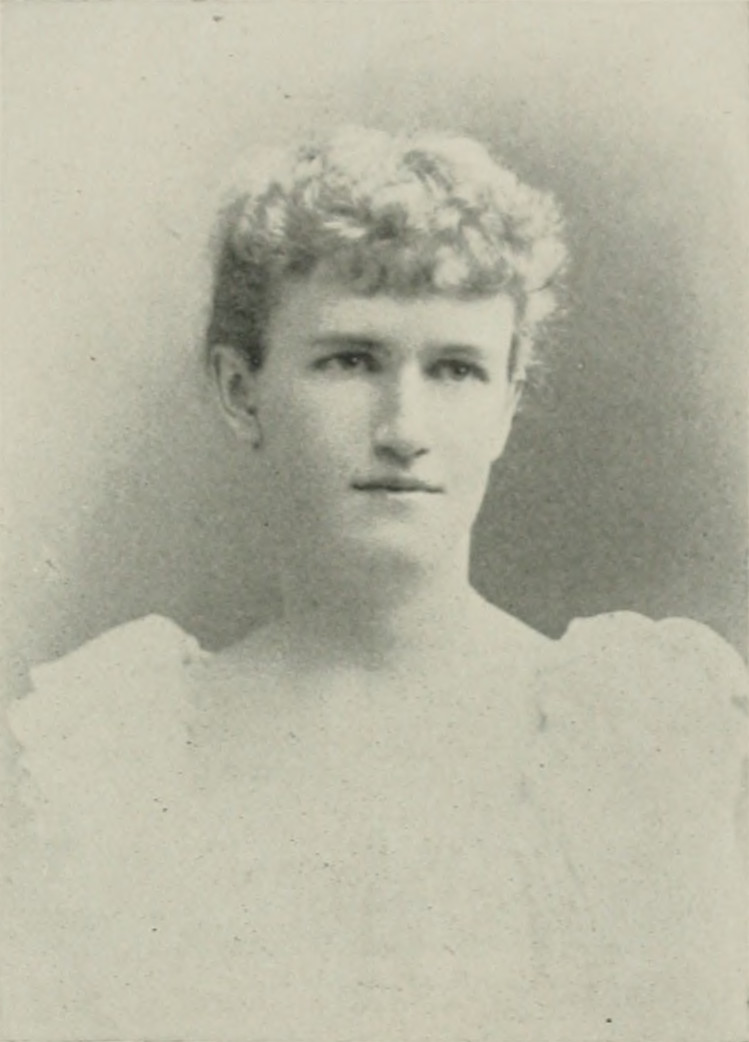
- Born: February 24, 1868; Richmond, Virginia, U.S.
- Died: December 18, 1952 (aged 84); Richmond, Virginia, U.S.
- Resting place: Hollywood Cemetery
- Education: Cooper Union; Art Students League of New York; Académie Julian
- Known for: Painting
- Movement: Impressionism

Adele Williams (February 24, 1868 – December 18, 1952) was an American artist who was one of the earliest Impressionist painters in Virginia.

== Biography ==
Adele Williams was born in Richmond, Virginia, the daughter of Victoria (née Smith) and John H. Williams. Graduating high school at the age of 15, she went to New York in 1886 to study at the Woman's Art School of Cooper Union and the Art Students' League. She also studied at the Académie Julian in Paris, where she won the Prix Concours medal. She studied there with Jacques Blanche, Lucien Simon and Émile-René Ménard. She studied at the Julien Studio with Gabriel Ferrier and William-Adolphe Bouguereau. Afterwards, she studied under Charles Webster Hawthorne in Provincetown, Massachusetts.

Williams worked in oil, watercolor, pastel, and mezzotint, painting landscapes, still lifes, and harbor and street scenes in an Impressionist style. She exhibited work at the Paris Salon during her stay in France, and after her return to the United States she showed at the American Watercolor Society, the Art Club of Philadelphia, and elsewhere. A number of her portraits are cataloged by the Catalogue of American Portraits at the National Portrait Gallery, including a 1902 self-portrait and a 1903 portrait of Ellen Axson Wilson, the first wife of President Woodrow Wilson. Her portrait of judge John W. Riely hangs in the Virginia Supreme Court, and her portrait of Commodore Matthew Fontaine Maury is owned by the University of Virginia.

Williams lived on West Avenue in Richmond. She died on December 18, 1952, in Richmond. She was buried in Hollywood Cemetery.
