= Halifax County Courthouse (Virginia) =

Preserved historic courthouse in Virginia, US

- U.S. National Register of Historic Places
- U.S. Historic district – Contributing property
- Virginia Landmarks Register
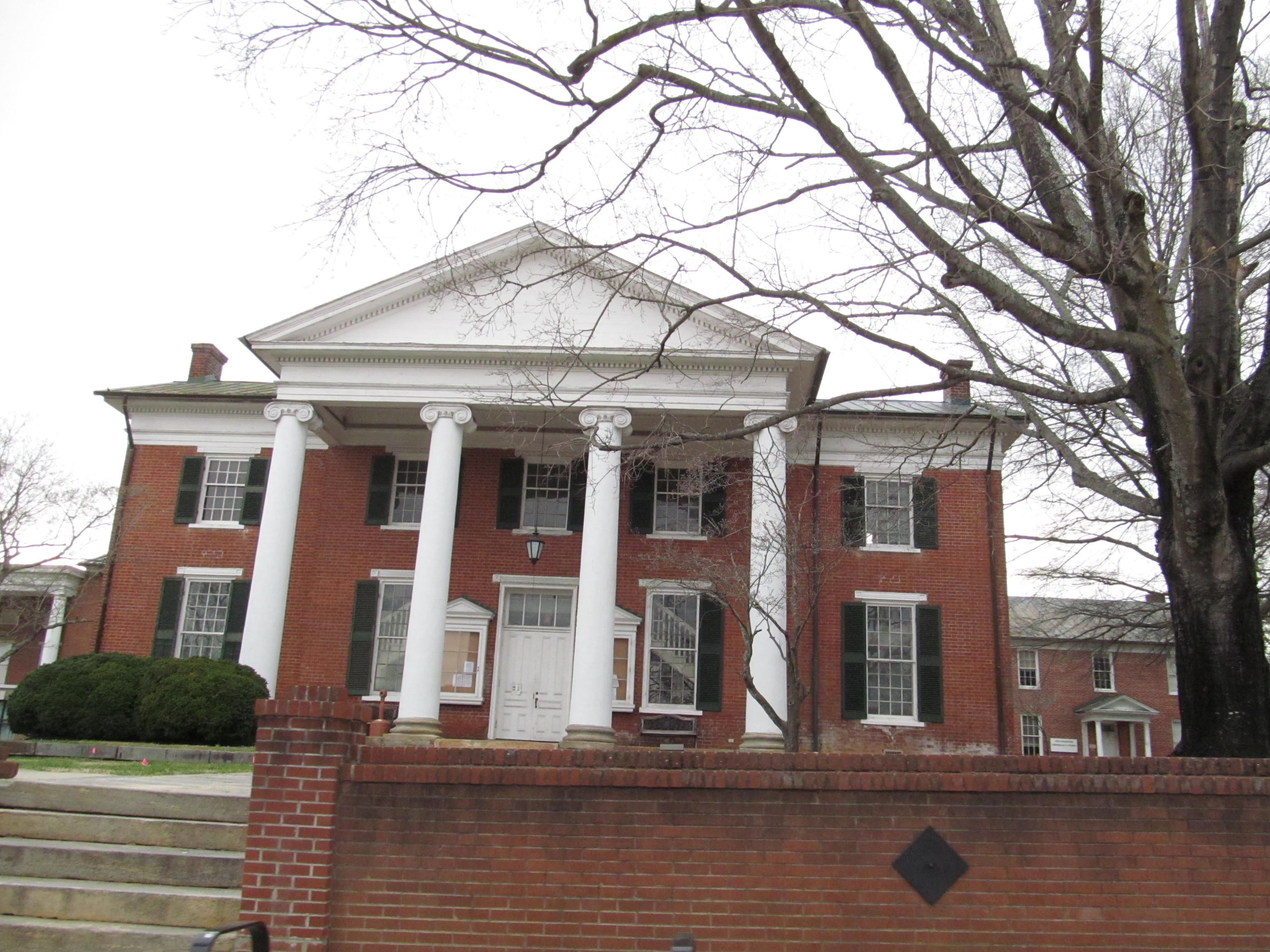
- Front elevation of the Halifax County Courthouse

- Location within Virginia Location within the United States
- Interactive map showing the location of Halifax County Courthouse
- Location: Jct. US 360 and US 501, Halifax, Virginia
- Coordinates: 36°45′56″N 78°55′46″W
- Area: 2 acres (0.81 ha)
- Built: 1838-1839
- Built by: Cosby, Dabney, Sr.
- Architectural style: Federal
- NRHP reference No.: 82004563
- VLR No.: 230-0077

Significant dates
- Added to NRHP: September 16, 1982
- Designated VLR: December 15, 1981

Halifax County Courthouse is a historic county courthouse located at Halifax, Halifax County, Virginia. It was designed and built in 1838-1839 by Dabney Cosby. It is a two-story, T-shaped brick building in the Federal style. The front facade features a two-story, tetrastyle portico in the Greek Ionic order.

It was listed on the National Register of Historic Places in 1982. It is located in the Town of Halifax Court House Historic District.
