= W. Harrison Daniel =

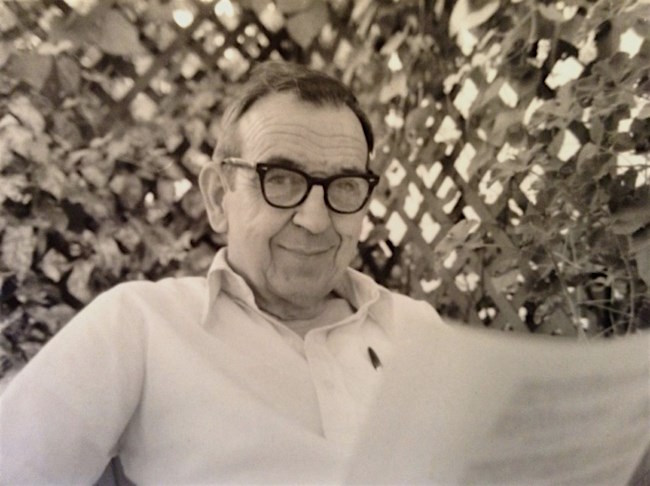
- Daniel reading in his garden, late 1980s
- Born: Wilbon Harrison Daniel; September 25, 1922; Lynchburg, Virginia, U.S.
- Died: December 30, 2013 (aged 91); Richmond, Virginia, U.S.
- Education: New London Academy; Lynchburg College; Vanderbilt University; Duke University
- Occupations: History professor; author
- Spouse: Margaret Anne Daniel
- Children: 1

Wilbon Harrison Daniel (September 25, 1922 – December 30, 2013) was a history professor at University of Richmond, Virginia Intermont College, Vanderbilt University and Duke University who authored numerous books, articles, and essays. He specialized in Southern church history.

== Partial list of books authored ==
- Baseball and Richmond: A History of the Professional Game, 1884–2000, 2002 (with Scott P. Mayer)
- Bedford County, Virginia, 1840–1860, 1985
- Frontier Baptist Activities, 1780–1803, 1947
- Historical Atlas of the Methodist Movement, 2009
- History at the University of Richmond, 1991
- Jimmie Foxx: The Life and Times of a Baseball Hall of Famer, 1907–1967, 2004
- Practicing the Future Perfect: Ministry Practices and Communal Mission in the New Testament, 2004
- River Road Church, Baptist: A History, 1945–1995, 1996
- Southern Protestantism in the Confederacy, 1989
- The University of Richmond, 1971–1999, 2000
- Virginia Baptists, 1860–1902, 1987

=== Notes ===
His works have been cited heavily by other authors and writers, including historian Rhys Isaac, historian Philip S. Foner, University of Tennessee, Chattanooga Professor Emeritus Charles H. Lippy, Princeton University Professor Emeritus John Frederick Wilson, University of Mississippi professor Charles Reagan Wilson, historian David Brion Davis, and historian Charles Royster. His biography of Major League Baseball Hall of Fame player Jimmie Foxx was reviewed in the Journal of Sports History.

== Personal life ==
Daniel was born in Lynchburg, Virginia, and attended New London Academy in Forest, Virginia. He later attended Lynchburg College, Vanderbilt University and Duke University. He was married to biologist Margaret Anne Daniel; they had one child, the professor, writer and editor Anne Margaret Daniel. He died at home at the age of 91, in Richmond, Virginia.
