= New London, Virginia =

Unincorporated community in Virginia, United States

- Unincorporated Community
- Location within Virginia
- Coordinates: 37°18′6″N 79°16′49″W
- Country: United States
- State: Virginia
- Elevation: 863 ft (263 m)

New London is currently an unincorporated community and former town in Campbell County, Virginia, United States. The site of the colonial community is eleven miles southwest of downtown Lynchburg. In 1754, Bedford County was formed and New London was established as the county seat. Situated near the intersection of the Great Wagon Road and the Wilderness Road, the town was an important stopping point for settlers heading west.

Patrick Henry delivered his famous "beef" speech during the John Hook trial in the New London Courthouse. Other prominent historical figures with connections to New London include Thomas Jefferson. Jefferson constructed his retreat, Poplar Forest, near New London in Bedford County. New London was also home to a Revolutionary-era arsenal. In 1781, Bedford County was divided in two, forming Campbell County. The Bedford county seat was then relocated to Liberty, later known as the town of Bedford. After the county seat and court were moved, the former bustling commercial center declined.

In the 19th century, the rising popularity of mineral springs sparked a brief revival. The Bedford Alum Springs Hotel, located in New London, drew visitors seeking the benefits of the nearby natural springs. The town sought to capitalize on this attraction and changed its name from New London to Bedford Springs in 1880.

New London is home to several historic structures. Mead's Tavern is the sole remaining building from the colonial era, but several historic buildings from the later period are still standing. These include the former Bedford Alum Springs Hotel, the office of Dr. Nicholas Kabler, the W.W. Driskill General Store, two Methodist churches, and the Holt-Ashwell house. The New London Academy (Virginia) is still in operation today as an elementary school.

In 2015, the Friends of New London, a nonprofit organization dedicated to preserving historic New London, sold Mead's Tavern to Liberty University. Current archaeological and architectural studies at Mead's Tavern are contributing to what is known about the building, the town, and the people who lived and worked there.

== History ==
=== Colonial history ===
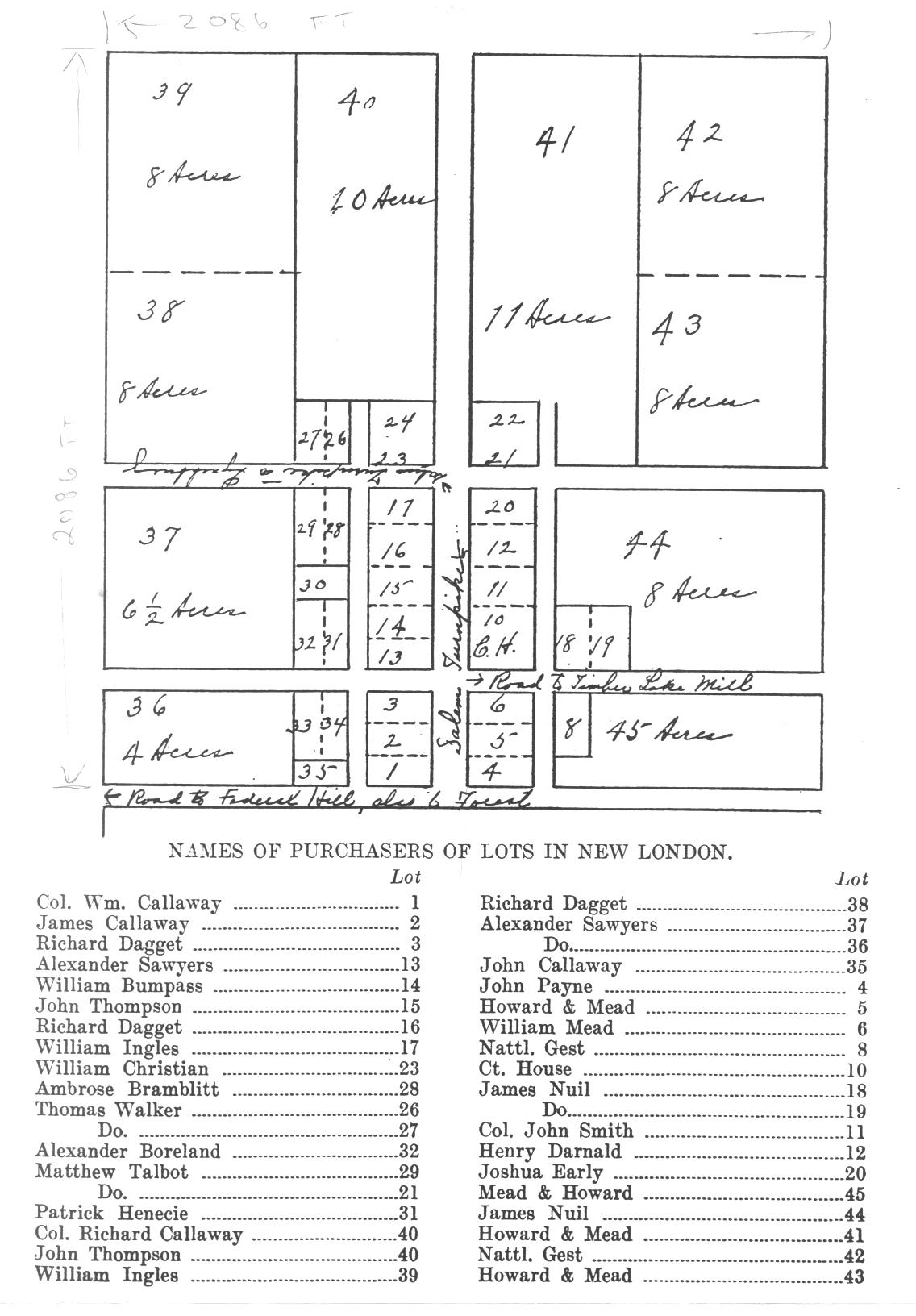
New London, Virginia original town plat, 1754

In 1753, William Callaway contributed 100 acres of land to the Virginia General Assembly for the creation of a new town which would soon serve as the county seat of the newly formed Bedford County. This tract of land became New London. In 1754, the courthouse and jail were erected. The town was laid out in lots and offered for sale. The town charter required that owners must construct a building of at least twenty-by-sixteen within one year. Its location at the intersection of the Great Wagon Road and Wilderness Road meant that it became a bustling center of travel and trade. It remained so until the formation of Campbell County in 1781 and the subsequent relocation of the county seat.

The New London courthouse was an important landmark of this time. The John Hook trial took place in the courthouse. During the Revolutionary War John Hook, a Scottish-born merchant living in New London, was accused of being sympathetic to the British. In 1781, John Venable, the commissary for the American army seized two of John Hook's steers for the army to eat. John Hook brought a case against John Venable for taking his property. The case stays on the docket until 1789. During the trial Patrick Henry defended the state and John Venable against John Hook. On September 19, 1789, Patrick Henry delivered his famous "beef speech".

=== John Hook ===
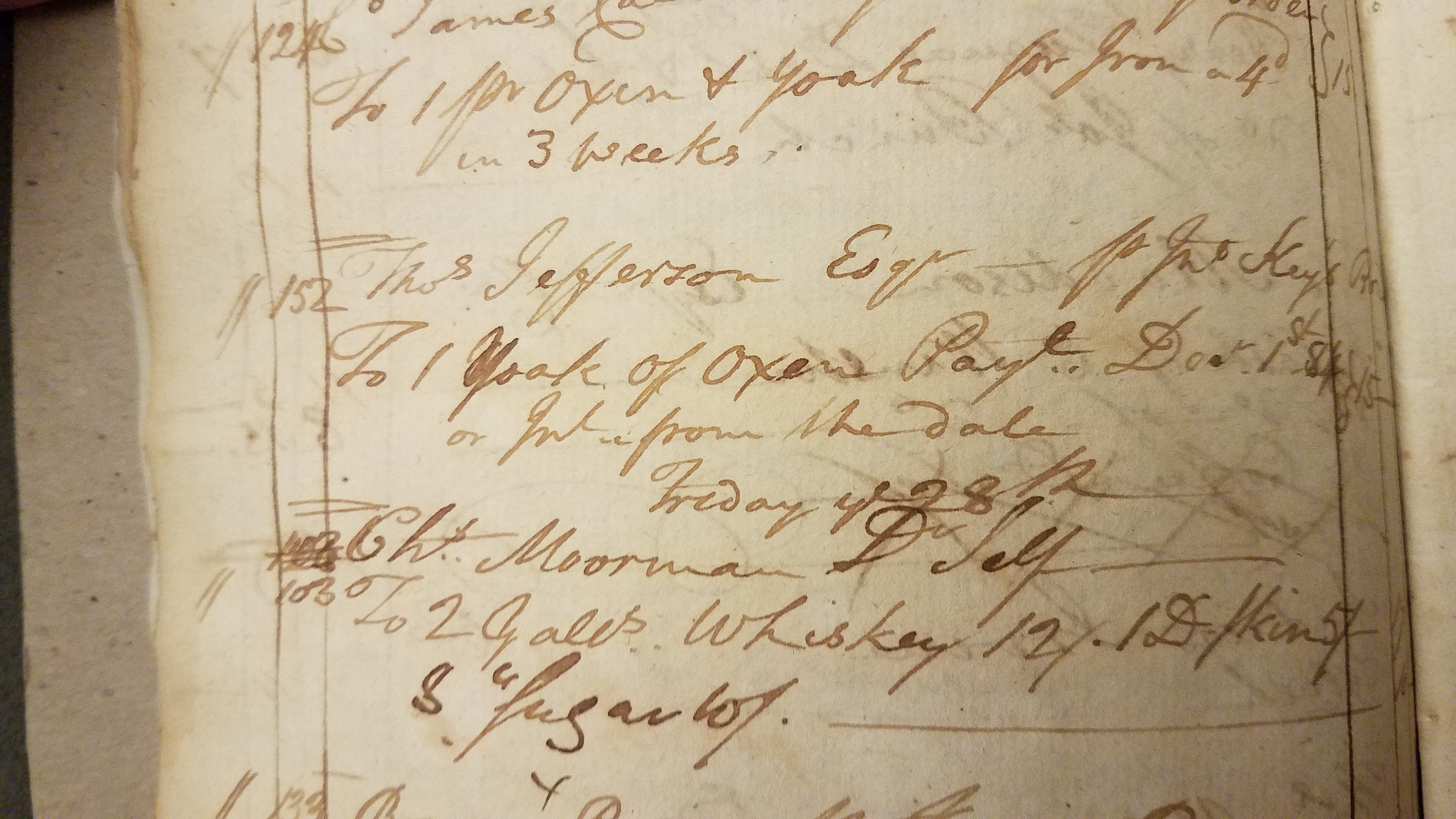
Portion of a page from one of John Hook's business ledgers showing a transaction of "1 yoke of oxen" with Thomas Jefferson on May 28, 1784, Picture part of the John Hook Papers, Rubenstein Library, Duke University

One of the best-documented merchants in Virginia and an early member of the town of New London, John Hook demonstrated how consumerism worked in Colonial and Post Colonial Virginia. He squabbled with rivals, complained to the firm's partners in Scotland, and grew discouraged that he had not achieved the dream of great wealth. Yet in only a quarter-century, Hook went from doing menial tasks in an established Tidewater store, to managing a store in Piedmont, to imagining expanding his business as the line of European settlement roared westward.

==== Early years and move to New London ====
Born in Scotland, John Hook (1745–1808) arrived in America as an apprentice at the age of 13 in 1758. He began his training as a shopkeeper and clerk learning the tobacco trade under the training of the Donald family, a Scottish family that dealt in tobacco in the Chesapeake area. In 1764 Hook traveled from Chesapeake to New London, Virginia, where he partnered with William and James Donald to establish a store.

By 1768 Hook was doing well in New London and wrote to his partner in Scotland stating "this and the adjacent Frontier counties is settling unaccountable fast from people below (the fall line of the James River) and from the Northward". In 1770 John Hook married Elizabeth Smith, daughter of Colonel John Smith of Goochland. John and Elizabeth had six children.

==== Hook the Loyalist ====
In June 1775, word was given to the Committee for Bedford County that John Hook had been heard making remarks and handing out pamphlets against the war with England. Hook wrote back to the committee asking for the charges in writing to which he responded with a declaration of his innocence. On June 18, 1777, a mob led by Colonel William Mead dragged Hook from his house to appear before the committee. According to Hook, they threatened to "burn down & cut my house to peaces over my head" and he was told "they intended tarring & feathering me." Ultimately, Hook was forced to sign a Certificate of Fidelity for Captain George Hancock at the Green Bryor Court on October 10, 1777, an act witnessed by Samuel Hairston.

==== Hook Trial ====
During the latter part of the Revolutionary War Army Commissary John Venable requisitioned two of Hook's cows for the troops. In 1783, after the war was over, Hook filed suit against Venable for the "theft" of the two cows. The case lingered on the docket until 1789. Hook was represented by Mr. Cowan and Venable acquired the services of Patrick Henry. The trial itself was the occasion for Henry's famous "Beef speech" which elicited strong laughter within the courtroom. The resulting verdict was for Hook for the sum of one cent.

==== John Hook Collection ====
Hook is one of the best documented merchants of Colonial America. The bulk of his surviving papers are held at the Rubenstein Library at Duke University.

=== 19th-century history ===
By the early 1800s, New London began to fade as an independent township due to the relocation of the county seat in 1781. Locals of both Bedford County and Campbell County created a petition for a new county to be created in 1813 with New London at its center, but the movement did not gain traction and ultimately failed.

Though it lost the court seat, New London's position next to a crossroad allowed it to have many visitors and even some prominent guests. In April 1816, General Andrew Jackson stayed in the town and almost had a duel in a New London tavern as he was passing through. Around 1820, the dirt Salem-Lynchburg Turnpike was covered with broken stone (macadam) which made traveling to and from New London smoother and helped to boost trade, at least until the introduction of the railroad in nearby Lynchburg in 1848.

New London changed its name to Bedford Springs in the late 1870s after the Echols family marketed water from the nearby alum spring and a large health resort named The Bedford Alum Springs Hotel opened in 1878.

=== Education history ===
In the early 19th century, New London was the location of at least two schools, the New London Academy and the Roland School for girls. New London Academy was a prominent secondary educational institution throughout the 19th century. In the first half of the 19th century, the academy offered a range of subjects and students would receive an individual diploma for every subject completed. New London Academy was so renowned, that Francis Eppes attended the academy at the insistence of his grandfather, Thomas Jefferson. Even during the Civil War, it managed to remain in operation. In its early years, the school had a strong religious affiliation. The school grounds were home to a brick Episcopal meeting house, and the ministers of the church were often the principals of the school. This religious connotation eventually faded, starting with the removal of the Academy Church in 1856 to another location after the original brick building was condemned and torn down in 1855. This separation of the church from the academy lead to it becoming a public school in 1870 and a coeducational school in 1879.

New London also hosted the Roland School for girls between 1812 and 1822 in the former Mead's Tavern. Roland was a finishing school run by Samuel T. Miller and his wife and may have held up to forty students at a time. The school closed in 1822 when Samuel Miller moved to Lynchburg to start another school.

=== Military history ===
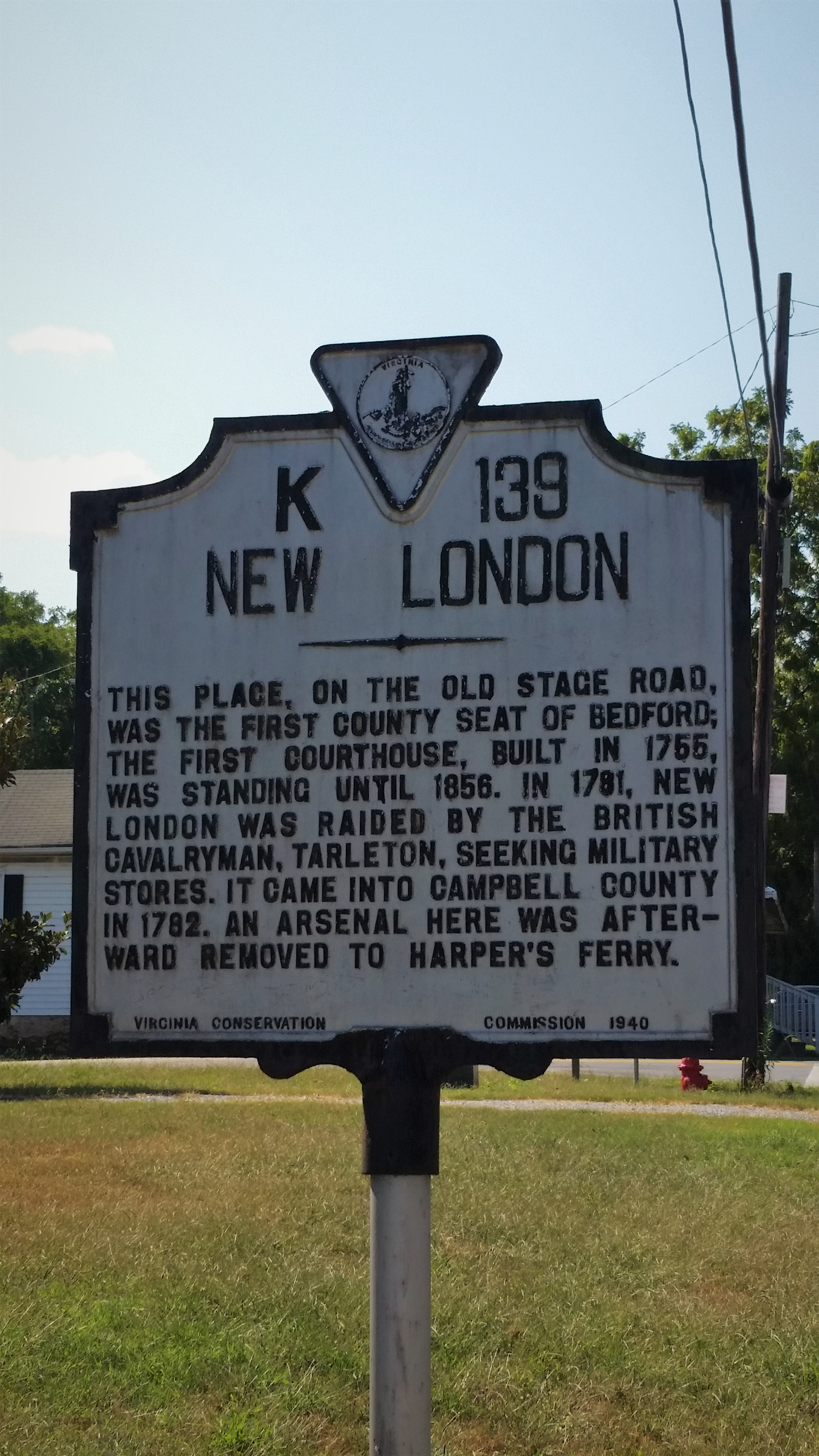
The historic marker at New London incorrectly states that Lieutenant-Colonel Tarleton raided New London.

It is possible that because of New London's central location in Bedford County it was a natural place for the county militia to drill and assemble for war. The county militia participated in several frontier conflicts including the French and Indian and Anglo-Cherokee wars. During the early French and Indian war, the Cherokees were allied with the British. That all changed when a series of misunderstandings and thefts led to a confrontation in 1758 between a Cherokee war party and colonists from Bedford County that left at least five Virginians and thirty Cherokees dead. This incident near New London exacerbated the already tense relationship between the British and the Cherokees and helped set in motion the events that led to the Anglo-Cherokee War.

=== Arsenal ===
During the Revolutionary War, New London was home to an arsenal used by the Virginia state militia. The weapons and supplies manufactured in the arsenal were used to help support the campaigns of General Nathaniel Greene in the South and Colonel George Rogers Clark in the Ohio river valley. In his memoirs, British Lieutenant-Colonel Banastre Tarleton claims to have raided New London in search of the arsenal and the supplies that were stored there. However, according to Thomas Jefferson, Tarleton never made it to New London and stayed closer to Charlottesville. The New London arsenal was operated by the state of Virginia until 1794 when Congress passed a law authorizing the war department to erect "three or four arsenals" to supply and equip the army. New London's existing state arsenal made it a natural choice for use as a federal arsenal.

Shortly after its acquisition by the war department, the New London arsenal helped furnish the weapons and equipment used by the army sent to suppress the Whiskey Rebellion in Pennsylvania in 1794. The arsenal only remained operational under Federal control for a short time. In 1798 the war department began the process of moving the arsenal to a new location with the transfer of armorer's tools from New London to Harper's Ferry. After the means of production were moved, New London continued to be used for the storage of military equipment until at least 1812. Today, Liberty University and the Friends of New London are hoping to conduct further investigations into finding the location of the arsenal, though historians believe it may have been located on the property of the Bedford Alum Springs Hotel.

== Historic structures ==
=== Mead's Tavern ===
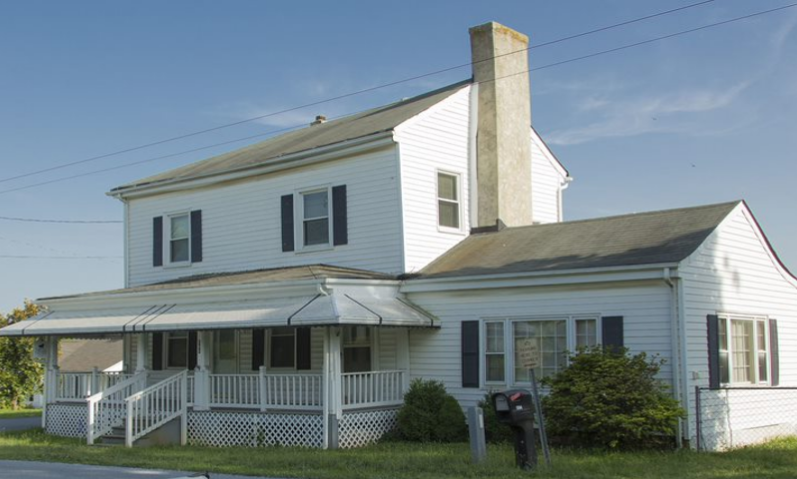
Front view of Mead's Tavern

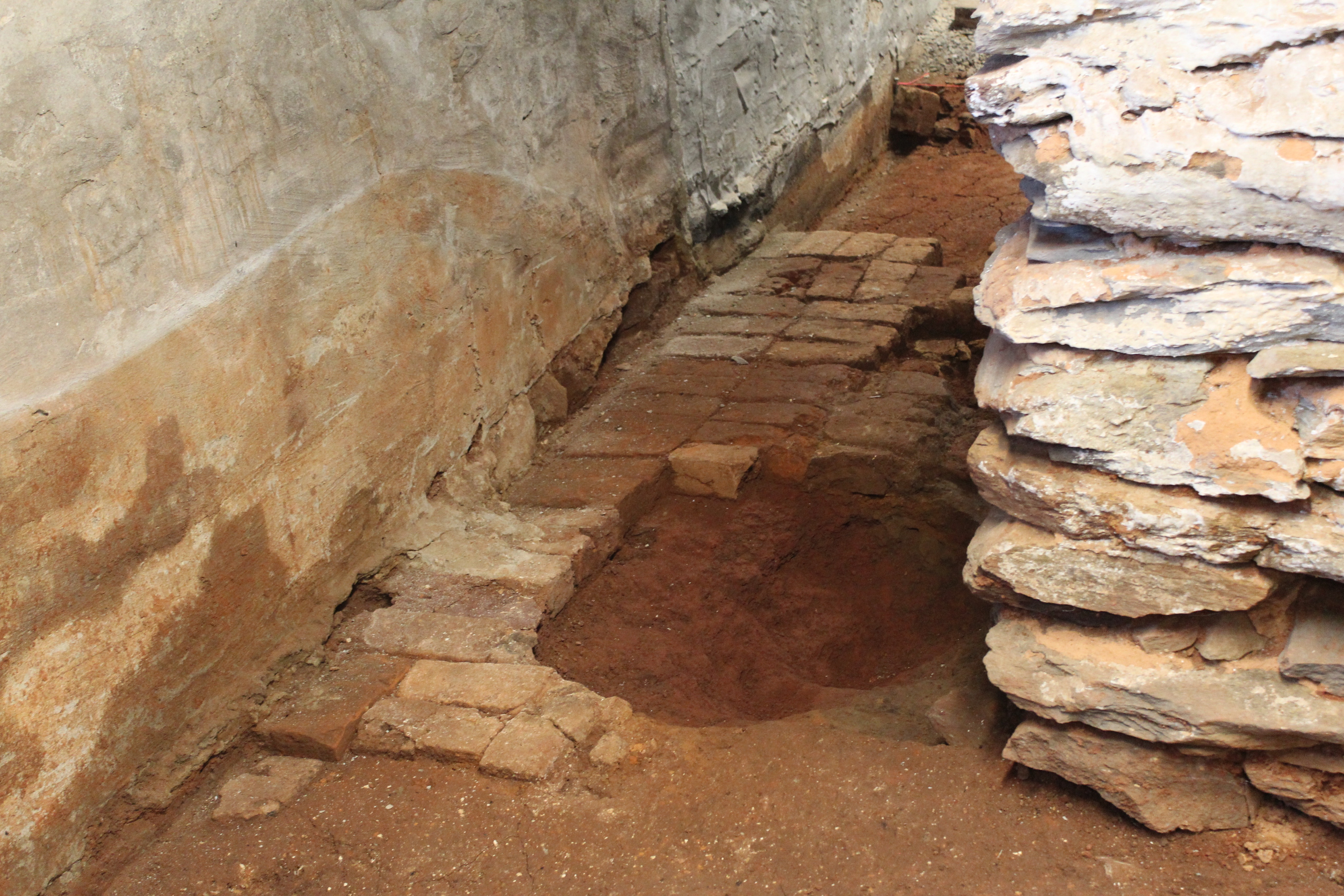
Photo of the basement excavation at Mead's Tavern

Mead's Tavern is the oldest standing structure in the Central Virginia area and the only remaining building from New London's colonial era. In 1761, William Mead acquired Lot 6 and constructed what was described as a "magnificent house" in 1763. In 1784, Mead sold the building which operated as a tavern for the next 20 years or so and was then converted into a girls' school. For most of its life, the former tavern served primarily as a family residence. It also housed the office of Dr. Thaddeus Kabler and later the office of William Abbott, an insurance agent. After passing through the hands of various private owners, the building was purchased by the Friends of New London in 2012 who sold the building to Liberty University in 2015.

There is archaeological and architectural evidence, such as the English bond brick style of the foundation, that prove even without the written records that the Tavern was built in the 1700s. Investigations have also uncovered evidence of another building that was a part of the property that is believed to have probably been the kitchen. There were also additional smaller buildings on the property that will likely turn up evidence once further investigation is done to the back of the property. Unlike most of the New London area, the property that Mead's Tavern sits on has been predominately left alone. Liberty is in the process of doing archaeological and architectural studies of the property.

=== Bedford Alum Springs Hotel ===
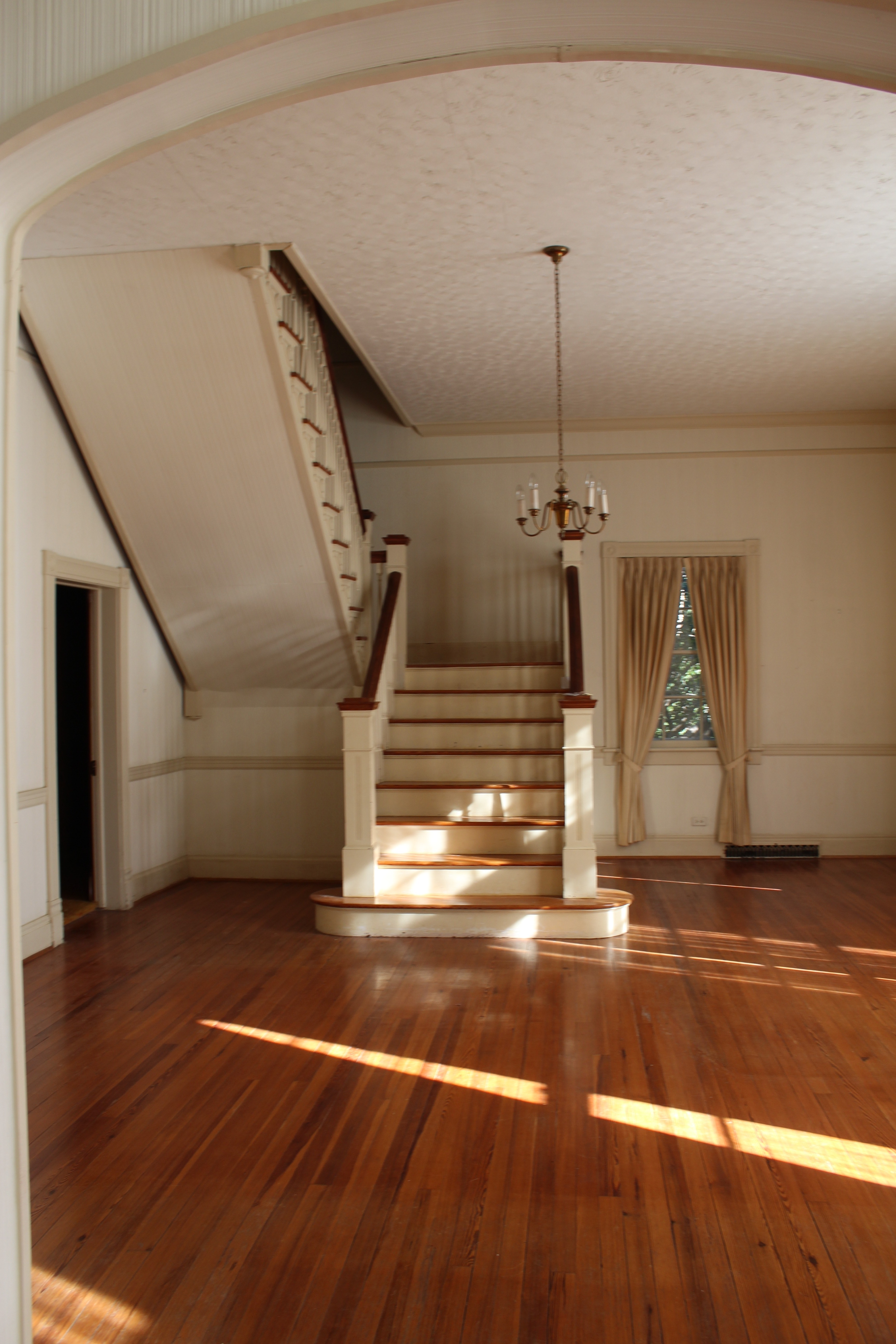
Main staircase of the Bedford Alum Springs Hotel

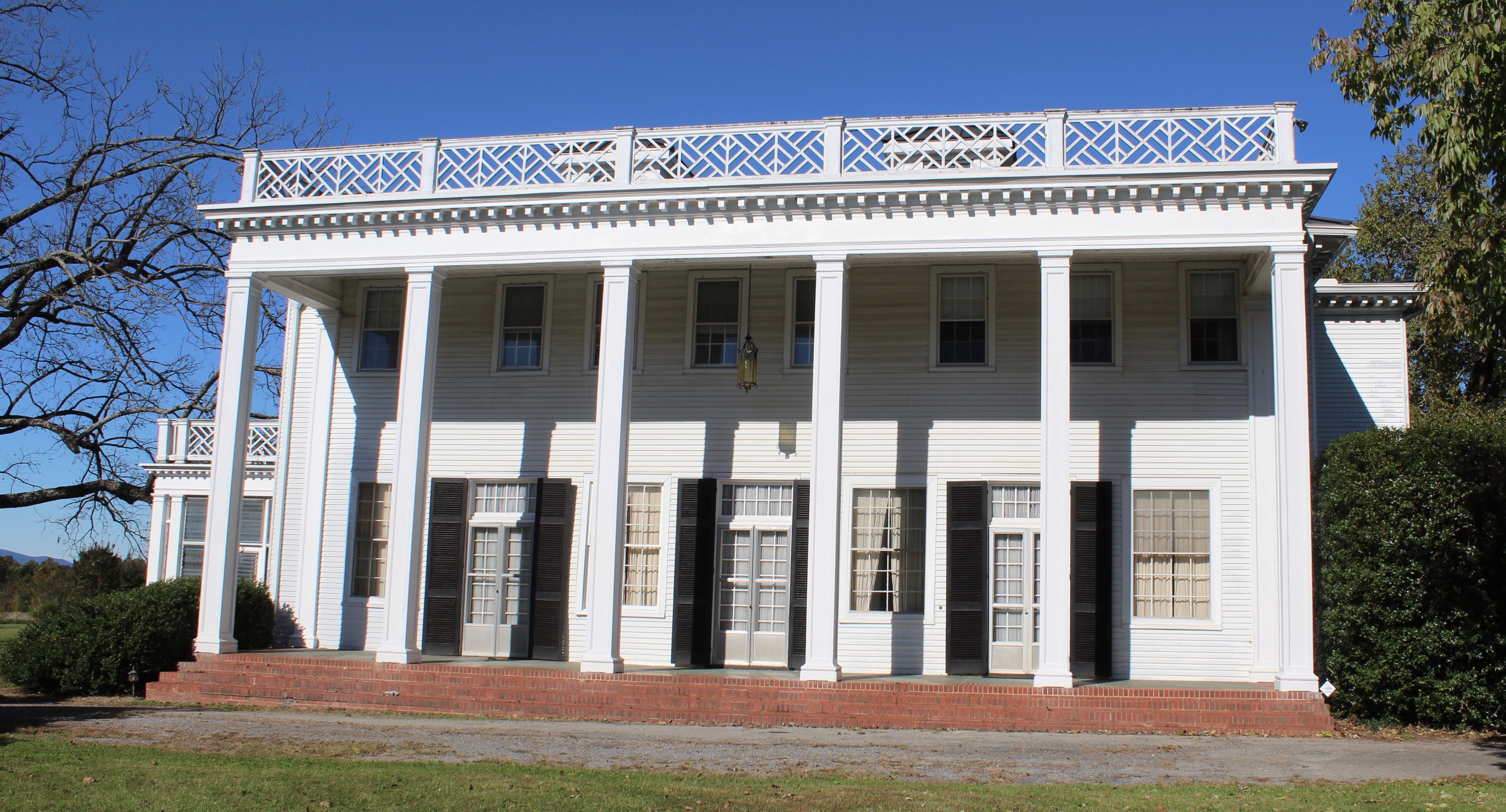
Front view of the Bedford Alum Springs Hotel

The property site of the hotel had a history in New London before the building of the hotel. It was originally owned by the Colonel James Callaway who was a patriot in the Revolutionary War and an influential man in Virginia during his lifetime (1735-1809). Because of Colonel Callaway's reputation and the amount of other buildings that are known to have been on site, the property that the hotel sits on is a suspected spot for the revolutionary arsenal that was kept at New London, though there has yet to be any substantial evidence to support this theory.

Mead's Tavern and the hotel property are connected as the man who ran the Roland Academy girls school located at Mead's, Samuel Miller, acquired the hotel property. The property passed to one more owner, a Ralph Smith, before being bought by Peregrine Echols in 1833. Bedford Alum Springs Hotel was originally a tavern owned by Peregrine Echols.

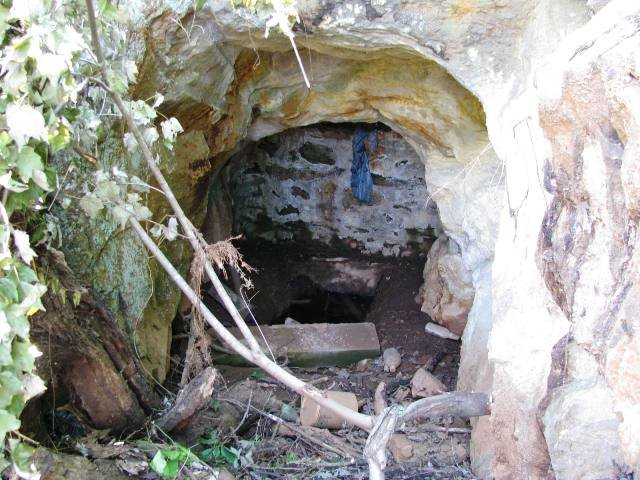
The New London alum spring whose water Peregrine Echols bottled for medicinal purposes.

Echols was also the first person in New London to capitalize on the natural alum springs that were located a short walk away from his property by bottling and selling the water for medicinal uses. The hotel was given the name The Bedford Alum Springs Hotel and was promoted as a resort, attracting travelers who sought the benefit of the nearby alum springs.

The success of the alum springs prompted the town to change its name from New London to Bedford Springs. In 1871, a fire burned down the original building. In 1877, the property that held Echols tavern was sold to John Maben who proceeded to build a large hotel. That building was burned in another fire in 1887. The hotel was rebuilt again, only to burn once more in 1902. The third rebuilt version of the hotel is what stands today. The historic site was bought by Liberty University in 2018. Liberty has plans of archaeological and architectural investigations for the hotel and property.

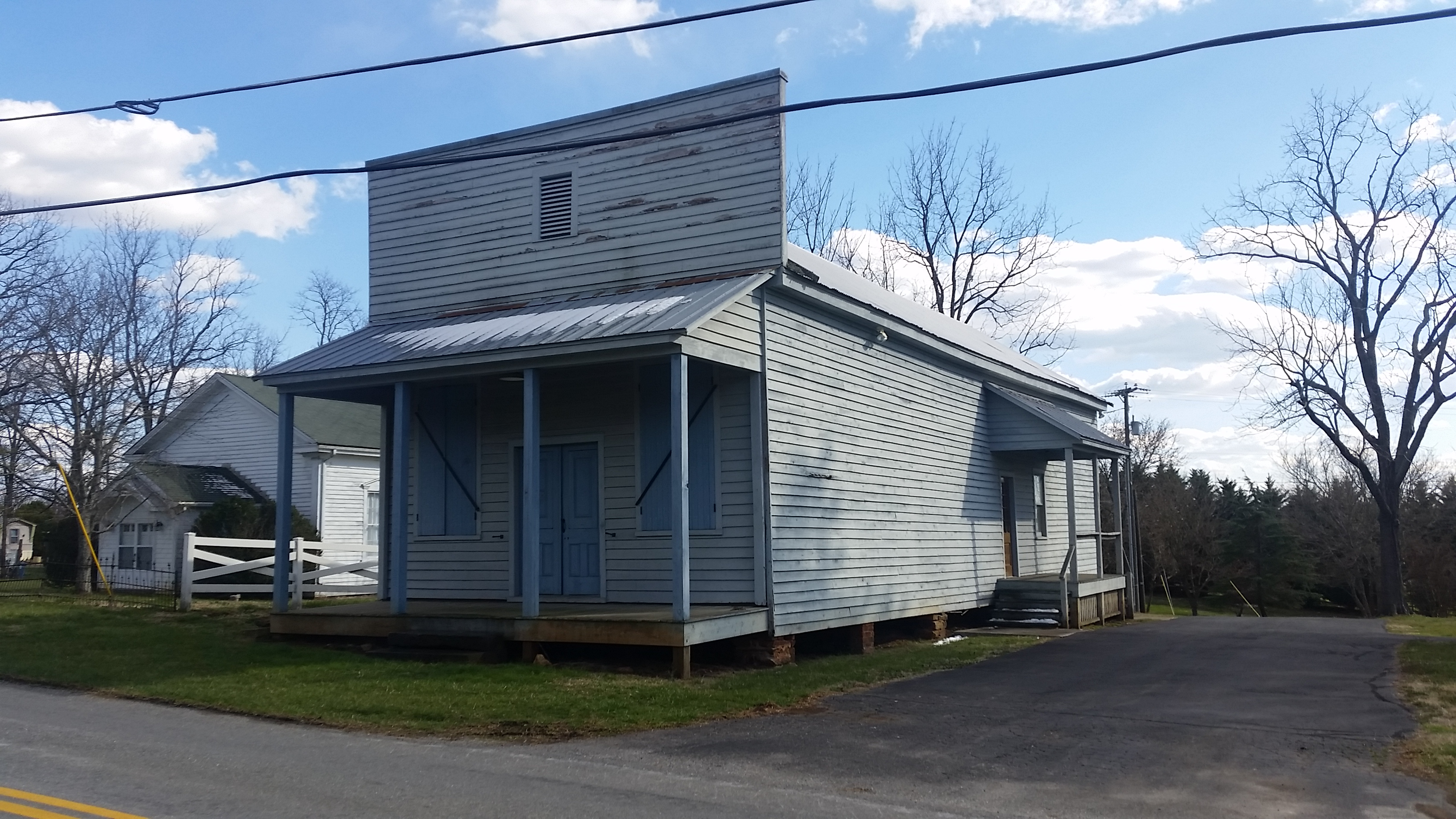
W.W. Driskill Store, New London, Virginia, Image Taken in 2019

=== W.W. Driskill Store ===
The general store in New London was built by Willis Washington Driskill in 1897 and remained in operation until the 1930s. It also housed the Bedford Springs post office until mail delivery was discontinued at this location in 1911. The building has been restored by its current owners and retains many of its original features. The building sits on one possible site of the colonial era military arsenal.

=== Holt-Ashwell House ===
This small, frame house dates to at least the early 19th-century with elements that may indicate earlier construction. Situated on what was Lot 17, belonging to William Ingles in the original town plat, then later to Andrew Holt, an emancipated African American who earned enough income as a baker to purchase the freedom of his wife and two sons. Holt donated a small section of his property for the construction of the Methodist Episcopal Church South. The current church building is the third structure on that lot. The house itself was unoccupied when it burned in 2017. The owner subsequently donated the property to the Friends of New London who have cleaned out the house and are considering options for restoration.

=== Churches ===
The New London Methodist church was built in 1850 several years after a congregation was organized. The church was home to circuit riding ministers who would travel to several different churches throughout the year. The New London Methodist Church belonged to the Bedford Alum Springs circuit. The church is still standing and is used as an office for the Friends of New London, who have worked to restore the town.

The current New London Methodist Episcopal Church South was erected in 1930, the third church building to be erected on this site since it was originally donated for the purpose. It remained in use for sixty years before it closed in 1990. In 1851 Andrew Holt, an emancipated African American man donated the small parcel for the construction of a church "for the special but not exclusive benefit of coloured people." The building is now owned by the Friends of New London and restoration plans are underway.

== Historic Cemeteries ==
=== African American Cemetery. ===
Dating back to the mid-late 19th century, the cemetery was where the slaves and freed blacks of New London would bury their deceased loved ones. The cemetery is currently overseen and maintained by Deloris Nash Hicks, a direct descendant of those buried there. Current efforts are being made to clean up the historic cemetery and to bring its burial grounds back to life.

=== Callaway-Steptoe Cemetery ===
The Callaway-Steptoe Cemetery, located on the property of Federal Hill in Forest, Virginia, serves as the final resting place for several prominent area settlers and their descendants including Col. William Callaway as well as his son-in-law James Steptoe. This cemetery was also the location of a skirmish that took place between Union and Confederate forces during the American Civil War. Evidence of the skirmish can still be seen today with holes in the walls surrounding the cemetery from cannonball fire.

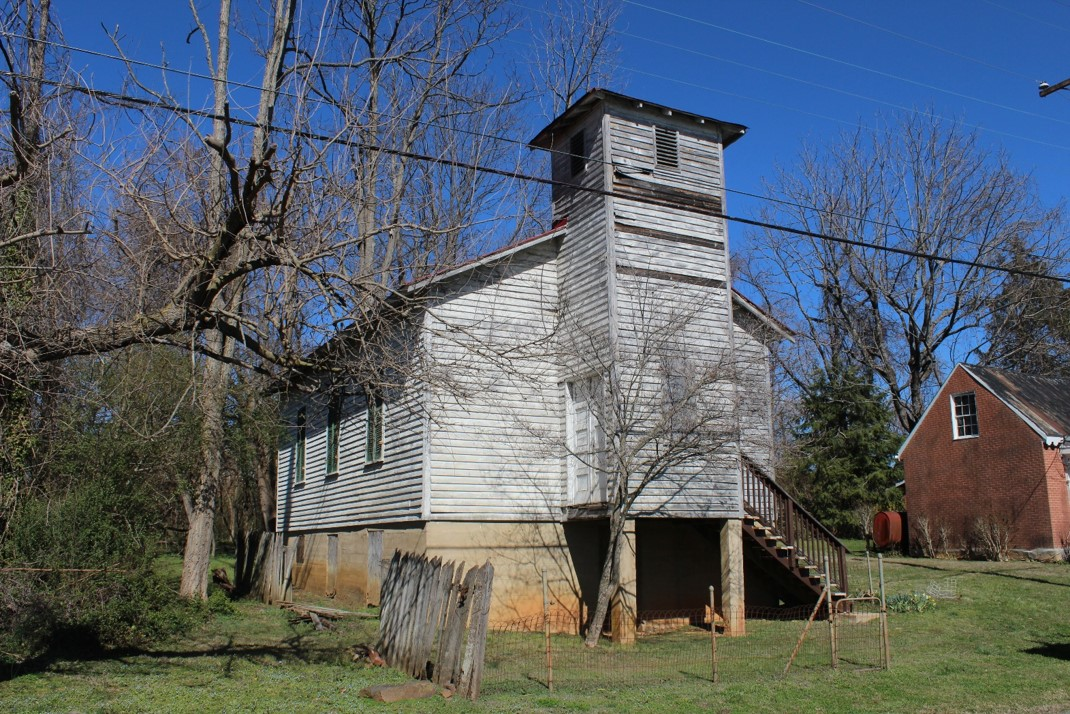
Front view of the African American Church

== Restoration ==
In 2005, members of the local community formed the Friends of New London for the purpose of recovering and preserving the history of the town. In 2015, with the sale of Mead's Tavern to Liberty University, a partnership was formed that would create opportunities for students to contribute to and learn from the restoration and preservation process.

In 2017, the Friends of New London acquired three additional buildings: the African American Methodist Church which was originally planned to be demolished; the New London Methodist Church which houses the Friends of New London office and library; and the Holt-Ashwell house, a 19th-century house which was badly damaged in a fire. All three buildings are in various stages of study and/or restoration.

In August 2018, the Bedford Alum Springs Hotel was acquired by Liberty University for an estimated $642,000.
