= Martin P. Burks =

American judge

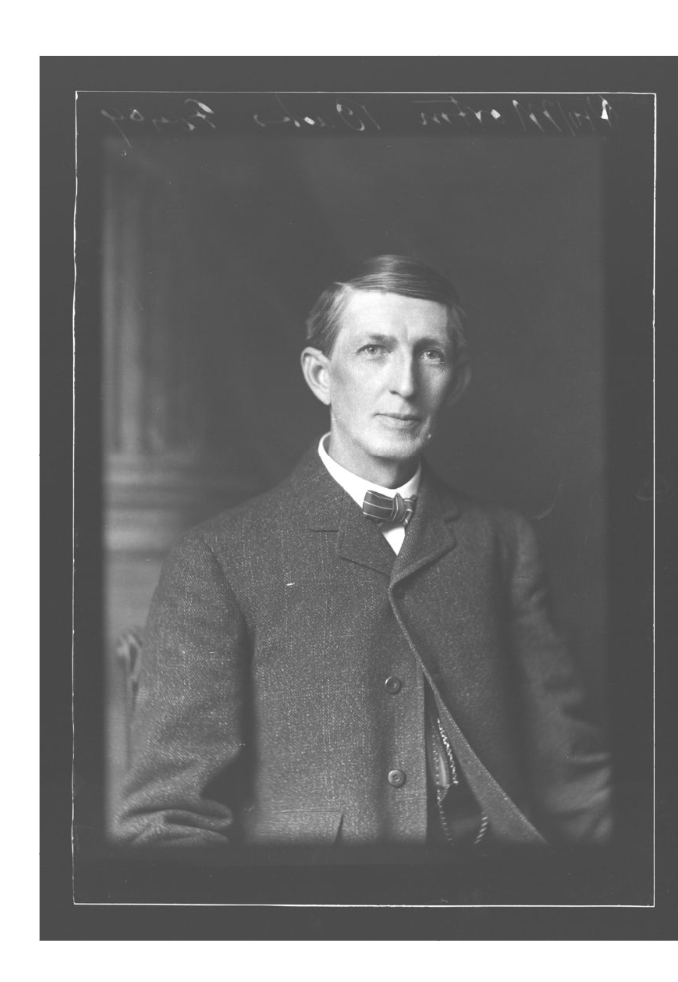
Photographic portrait of Martin P. Burks, taken in 1904

Martin Parks Burks (January 23, 1851 – April 30, 1928) (some sources give the date of his birth as 1850), born in Bedford County, Virginia, was a lawyer, educator and justice of the Supreme Court of Virginia.

== Biography ==
Martin Burks' father was Judge Edward C. Burks, who served on the Supreme Court of Appeals from 1876 to 1882. Martin Burks attended Washington and Lee University when he was only fifteen years old. He later entered the University of Virginia and graduated with a Bachelor of Law Degree. In 1872, he was admitted to the bar and began practicing law in Bedford County in partnership with his father. This partnership continued until his father became a member of the Supreme Court of Appeals. The younger Burks remained in practice at Bedford until he returned to Washington and Lee in 1900 as a professor of law. Three years later he was made dean of the law department where he stayed until he was elected to the Supreme Court of Appeals in 1917. Judge Burks was on the court until he resigned on April 16, 1928, because of ill health. He died shortly before his resignation became effective. Because of his enthusiasm and extensive study of the law, Judge Burks wrote a monograph in 1893, which was published as Burks on Separate Estates. This was adopted as a textbook by practically every law school in Virginia. In 1913, his book on common law, Burks’ Pleading and Practice, was published. It immediately became the authority to lawyers and jurists on the subjects it included, and it was also adopted as a textbook by the law schools in Virginia.

His home, the Burks–Guy–Hagen House was built in 1884, and listed on the National Register of Historic Places in 1985.
