= Burks–Guy–Hagen House =

Historic house in Virginia, United States

- Burks–Guy–Hagan House
- U.S. National Register of Historic Places
- Virginia Landmarks Register
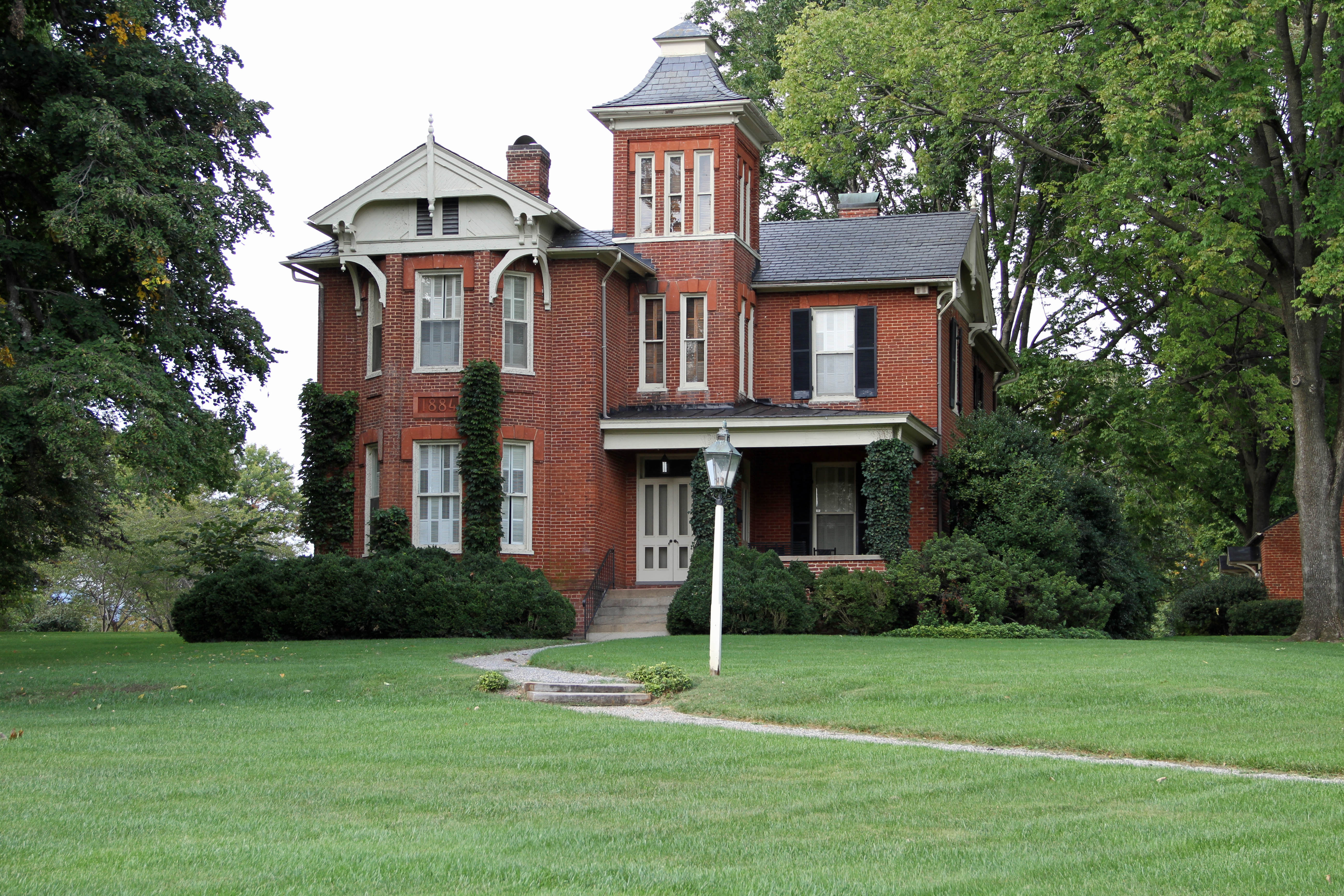
- Burks–Guy–Hagan House, September 2012

- Location within Virginia Location within the United States
- Location: 520 Peaks St., Bedford, Virginia
- Coordinates: 37°20′21″N 79°31′24″W
- Area: 9 acres (3.6 ha)
- Built: 1884
- Architectural style: Victorian Villa
- NRHP reference No.: 85003201
- VLR No.: 141-0027

Significant dates
- Added to NRHP: December 19, 1985
- Designated VLR: September 17, 1985

Burks–Guy–Hagan House is a historic home located at Bedford, Virginia. It was built about 1884, and is a two-story, brick dwelling in a Victorian Villa style. It features a three-level square tower with a mansard roof and complex bracketed wooden gable with a hood or "apron". It is set among romantically landscaped grounds and wood-bordered rear meadow. The house was built for Judge Martin P. Burks (1851-1928).

It was listed on the National Register of Historic Places in 1985.
