= Edward Southey Joynes =

American author & academic (1834-1917)

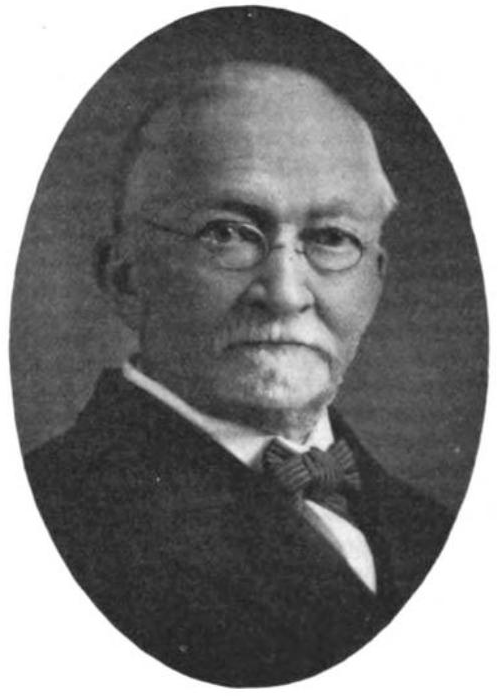
- Born: March 21, 1834; Accomac, Virginia
- Died: June 18, 1917 (aged 83); Columbia, South Carolina
- Occupation: University professor
- Spouse: Eliza Waller Vest Joynes (m. 1859)
- Children: 2
- Relatives: William T. Joynes (brother); J. Willard Ragsdale (son-in-law)

Edward Southey Joynes (March 21, 1834 – June 18, 1917) was an American textbook author and university professor of modern languages, especially German and French. Although he taught at the College of William & Mary before the American Civil War, the bulk of his career was spent teaching foreign languages at other Southern universities during the Reconstruction Era.

== Early life ==
Edward Southey Joynes was born on March 21, 1834, in Accomac, Virginia, the youngest son of Thomas Robinson Joynes (1790-1858) and his wife. His grandfather, Levin Joynes, had served as a Continental Army officer in the American Revolution, and his father was a prominent planter and attorney who represented the county in the Virginia House of Delegates and the Virginia Constitutional Convention of 1829. Although his eldest brothers William T. Joynes and Dr. Levin S. Joynes attended Washington College in Pennsylvania after their private education on Virginia's Eastern Shore, Edward attended Concord Academy and Delaware College. He then moved to Charlottesville, Virginia, for studies at the University of Virginia, from which he received an A.B. (1852) and A.M. (1853). He then taught at the University of Virginia as an assistant professor for three years, before traveling to Berlin, Germany for further studies in 1856-857. He would receive honorary LLD. degrees from Delaware college in 1875, and the College of William and Mary in 1878.

== Career ==
In 1858, the year of his father's death, Joynes became Professor of Greek and Greek Literature as well as German at the College of William & Mary in Williamsburg, Virginia. He also owned six enslaved people in his native Accomack County in 1860.

During the American Civil War of 1861-1865, Joynes was the only faculty member at William and Mary not to become an officer in the Confederate Army. Instead, he became chief clerk for the Confederate Bureau of War, reporting to the Secretary of War and interacting with many Confederate leaders, including General Robert E. Lee, with whom he developed a friendship. He also served as a private in the 3rd Virginia Regiment (Home Guard), but probably did not actually experience combat. He left the War Department in 1864 to return to teaching, at Hollins College.

After the war, Governor Francis Pierpont recommended he be pardoned, as occurred on July 6, 1865. Former C.S.A. General Robert E. Lee hired Joynes to teach modern languages at Washington and Lee University (then also known as Washington College) in Lexington, Virginia, in 1866.

Following Lee's death, Joynes organized a modern language department at Vanderbilt University in Nashville, Tennessee, and became its first Professor, officially on the faculty roll in 1875. Later, he became Professor of Modern Languages at the University of Tennessee in Knoxville, Tennessee, and finally at the University of South Carolina in Columbia, South Carolina. In addition to lectures and addresses, Joynes edited the "Joynes-Otto" series of text-books in French and German (1870–75); "Classic French Plays" (2 vols., 1870–82), Joynes-Meissner German Grammar (1887); Minimum French Grammar (1893), and numerous other textbooks in French and German, as well as promoted the new public schools in Virginia and Tennessee (1866–82) and later South Carolina. He paved the way for the establishment of the Columbia City School System, and helped found and became a charter member of the Board of Trustees at Winthrop University in Rock Hill, South Carolina.

While teaching literature, Joynes believed undergraduates should not know much about the author of a given text; instead, this should be reserved to graduate students.

== Personal life, death and legacy ==
He married Eliza Waller Vest Joynes (1854–1914) in Williamsburg in 1859. They had two children.

The widower died on June 18, 1917, in Columbia, South Carolina. Joynes Hall on the Winthrop University campus is named in his honor.

== Bibliography ==
- A Practical Introduction to French Pronunciation:: Designed to Accompany the First Study of the Grammar (1867).
- A German Grammar for Schools and Colleges (1904).
- Heath's Practical German Grammar: In Progressive Lessons (1908).
- Old Letters of a Student in Germany, 1856-57 (1916).
