= Dickie Joynes =

English footballer

Personal information
- Full name: Richard Albert Joynes
- Date of birth: 16 August 1877
- Place of birth: Grantham, England
- Date of death: 1949 (aged 71–72)
- Positions: Outside right; inside right

Senior career*
Years	Team	Apps	(Gls)
- Newark Avenue
????–1901	Newark		
1901–1903	Notts County	48	(3)
1903–1905	Newark		
1905–1908	Brighton & Hove Albion	101	(20)
1908–1910	Leeds City	22	(1)
- * Club domestic league appearances and goals

Richard Albert Joynes (16 August 1877 – 1949) was an English professional footballer who made 70 appearances in the Football League playing for Notts County and Leeds City. He also played for Midland League club Newark and Southern League club Brighton & Hove Albion. He played as a right-sided forward. Joynes, born in Grantham, Lincolnshire, played more than 100 games for Brighton & Hove Albion, and was the club's joint top scorer in 1905–06 with just nine goals in all competitions.
