= William T. Joynes =

American judge

Justice of the Virginia Supreme Court
- In office 1866 – March 2, 1872
- Preceded by: William J. Robertson
- Succeeded by: Wood Boulden

Circuit Judge for Dinwiddie County

Member of the Virginia House of Delegates representing Petersburg and Dinwiddie County
- In office 1865–1866

Personal details
- Born: November 8, 1817 Accomack County, Virginia, US
- Died: March 15, 1874 (aged 56) Petersburg, Virginia, US
- Education: Washington College; University of Virginia School of Law
- Profession: Lawyer, judge

William T. Joynes (November 8, 1817–March 15, 1874) was a Virginia lawyer, railroad president, politician and judge, who served in the Virginia House of Delegates and Virginia Court of Appeals.

== Early and family life ==
Joynes was born at a house known as Montpelier in Accomack County, Virginia on November 8, 1817 to the former Anne Belle Satchell (1792-1862) and her husband Thomas Robinson Joynes (1789-1858), a prominent planter and politician who served in the Virginia House of Delegates during the War of 1812 (during which he married), and who was for years the clerk of the county court, as well as served as a delegate to the Virginia Constitutional Convention of 1829. His paternal ancestors had emigrated more than a century earlier, and his grandfather Col. Levin Joyce (1753-1794) had led the county militia to serve under General George Washington. The Joynes family included younger brothers, Dr. Levin Smith Joynes (1815-1881), Thomas R. Joynes Jr. (1829-1868) and Edward Southey Joynes (1834-1917), as well as sisters Mary Stockley Joynes Scarburgh (1815-1885), Louisa Ann Joynes Dennis (1822-1852) and Charlotte Bell Joynes (1825-1843). After a private education suitable to his class, William Joynes traveled to Pennsylvania and received a degree from Washington College. He later returned to Virginia for studies at the University of Virginia School of Law.

William T. Joynes married Margaret Feild May, and they had a daughter, Anna (b. 1841) and sons Thomas R. Joynes (b. 1846) and John Joynes (b. 1850). In 1840, William T. Joynes owned 6 slaves in Accomack county, and Levin Joynes another 7. In the 1850 census, his father Thomas R. Joynes lived with his wife, unmarried daughter and youngest son, and owned 33 slaves in Accomack County, as well as leased another 21 slaves to work at other farms in the county. Two years after his death, in the 1860 census, a trust for which William Joynes was executor owned a 12 year old Black boy. His youngest brother Edward S. Joynes also owned 6 slaves in Accomack County. Meanwhile, his widowed mother moved to Granville County, North Carolina, where she died at his doctor brother's home in 1862.

== Career ==
After admission to the Virginia bar, Joynes settled in Petersburg in 1839 to practice law. He became a law partner of John Fitzhugh May (1784-1856) who later became a judge, and married one of his four daughters (another daughter married lawyer and later Congressman Thomas Bayly of Accomack County). Joynes also served as United States Attorney for the Eastern District of Virginia for a time. Petersburg, situated on the south bank of the Appomattox River grew into Virginia's third largest city by 1860 (the only larger cities were the state capital at Richmond about 20 miles away and the key railroad and canal terminus at Wheeling on the Ohio River, which prompted the separation of West Virginia during the war).

A key factor in Petersburg's growth beginning in the 1840s was the Petersburg Railroad, which linked Petersburg with Weldon, North Carolina (the last few miles leased from another company). Congressman Francis E. Rives, a former slave-trader who funded several railroads in southern Virginia and adjacent North Carolina, was the railroad's key influencer. The City of Petersburg owned half its stock. As the war began, Joynes was President of the Petersburg and Weldon Railroad. His railroad became very important for supplying Richmond, as well as for transporting and supplying Confederate troops. In the war's early days, the railroad had more freight business than it could handle, much destined for the confederate Capital. President Jefferson Davis negotiated with Joynes, who allowed rail to link his railroad's station with that of the (generally less efficient) Richmond and Petersburg Railroad on the other side of the Appomattox River, provided the Confederate government paid for the bridge and track construction (as well as the freight hauled), and agreed that his railroad owned the improvements. However, the linking track was not designed nor constructed well, which caused detracking of some trains, and its rebuilding two years later. By winter, the Confederate government arranged for a freight boat between Richmond and Petersburg to supplement freight service (and a private company established another), plus boys below military age drove cattle by road into Richmond and civilians wanting to travel between the cities had to obtain a pass from Petersburg's mayor as well as a train ticket, but no trains were available to deliver coal from Chesterfield County to the Petersburg gas orks. As of Christmas, 1861, the Petersburg railroad also had a machine shop in the city's southwestern district (which built 19 freight and passenger cars that year); the Petersburg Railroad employed 66 white workers and 150 Black workers (both free and enslaved). As Federal troops approached Petersburg in May 1862, Confederate authorities twice specifically directed Joynes that military needs had higher priority for rolling stock than those of wealthy citizens who sought to flee the city with their furniture and other goods. In 1863, Joynes remained in Petersburg and was elected judge of the First Judicial District in the Confederate establishment. Petersburg refused for nearly a year to succumb to Federal forces despite the long Siege of Petersburg (June 15, 1864 – April 2, 1865) and Battle of the Crater. Shortly before the siege began, in May 1864, Joynes' eldest son, Thomas R. Joynes (or possibly his brother of the same name back in Accomack County) joined the local Washington Battery of artillery, but survived the conflict. His brother Dr. Levin Joynes served as a Confederate surgeon and his youngest brother Edward with the local defense force back in Accomack County, which Union forces soon occupied (although his pardon application mentioned only his teaching job at the College of William and Mary, which closed during the war, and a clerical position in Richmond). However, by the war's end, the Petersburg Railroad was nearly destroyed, as were most railroads leading into Richmond. Joynes managed to secure funding to rebuild the railroad within a year, perhaps helped by his brother in law, George R. Dennis who had served as a Union Army Colonel before beginning his political career on Maryland's Eastern Shore.

In the fall of 1865, Petersburg and neighboring Dinwiddie County voters elected Joynes and R.P. Atkinson to the Virginia House of Delegates. During the following session in 1866, following the deposition of Confederate-aligned Virginia judges, Governor Francis Pierpont (before his return to Wheeling in what had become the new state of West Virginia) nominated Joynes, Alexander Rives and Lucas P. Thompson to the Virginia Court of Appeals. When the Virginia General Assembly elected all three to 12-year terms (although Thompson died before taking office), Rives ended his legislative service.

However, during Congressional Reconstruction, General John Schofield deposed all the Virginia appellate judges and replaced them with dedicated Union men, to some consternation. Judge Joynes resumed his appellate duties as Congressional Reconstruction ended (with the adoption in 1869 of a new state constitution formally abolishing slavery and re-admission to the Union), but only for about two years. After suffering a stroke, Joynes resigned from the court in 1873 for reasons of ill health and died the following year. Legislators elected Wood Boulden as his successor.

== Death and legacy ==
Joynes died at his Petersburg home on March 15, 1874, survived by his widow, daughter Anna and son Thomas R. Joynes. The latter had become a lawyer and moved back into the family home after his divorce. However, the Petersburg Railroad came into severe financial problems under his successor Reuben Ragland, and following the Panic of 1873, was forced into bankruptcy. Ragland tied to secure convicts to repair the tracks, but was replaced by COl. Isaac H. Carrington and Richmonders who had access to New York financiers in 1875. In 1880, the Joynes household (sans the judge) also employed three Black women as servants.

His youngest brother Edward Southey Joynes continued his academic career at several Southern universities, including writing a paper honoring Robert E. Lee in 1901. The Joynes house in Petersburg still stands, as part of the Poplar Lawn Historic District.
