= Town of Halifax Court House Historic District =

Historic district in Virginia, United States

- U.S. National Register of Historic Places
- U.S. Historic district
- Virginia Landmarks Register
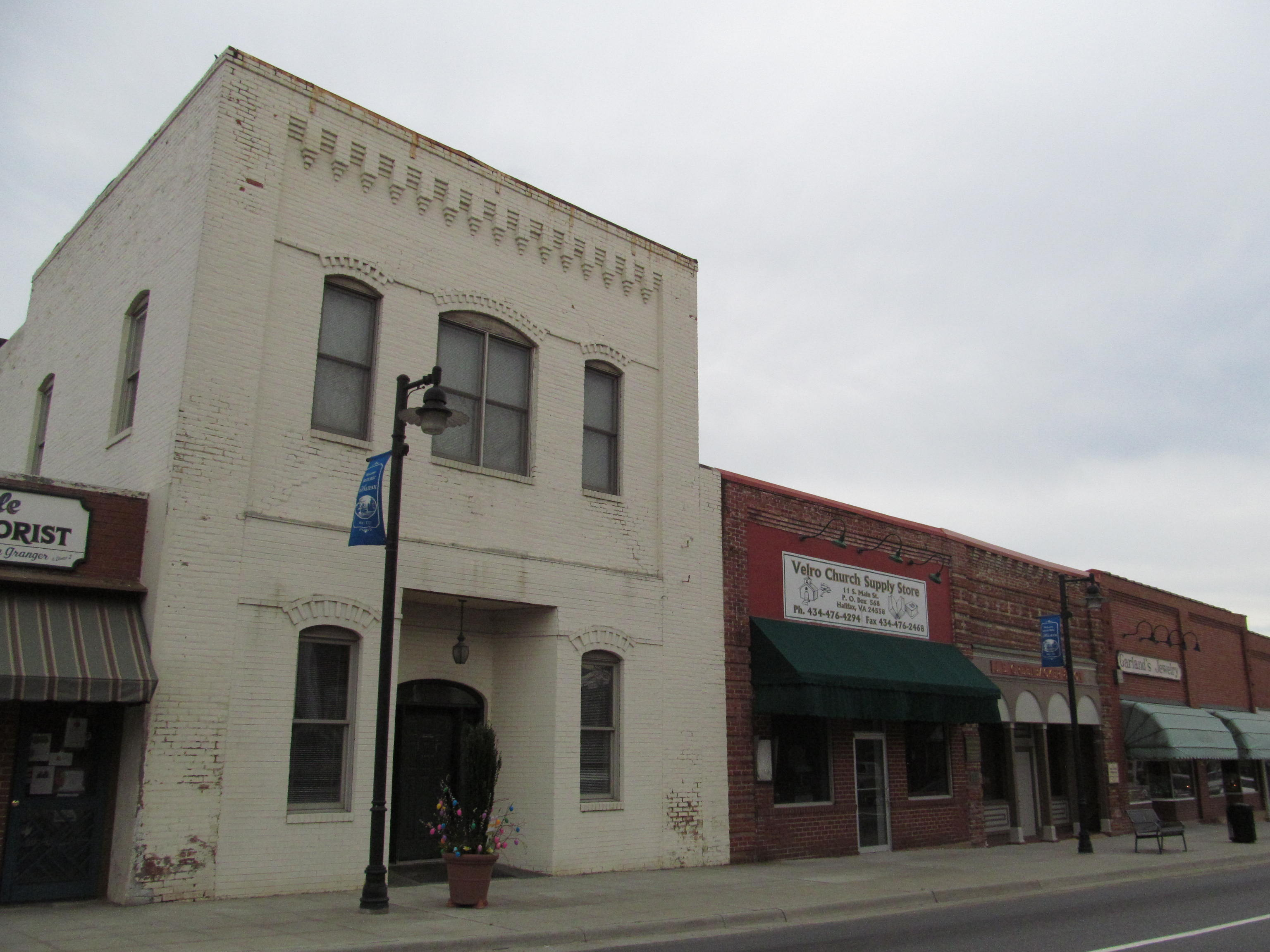
- Commercial buildings on Main Street

- Location within Virginia Location within the United States
- Location: Main St., Cemetery St., Prizery St., Edmunds Boulevard, Mary Bethune St., Cowford Rd., Maple Ave., Church St., Cary St. Halifax, Virginia
- Coordinates: 36°45′58″N 78°55′43″W
- Area: 129 acres (52 ha)
- Built: 1839
- Architect: Dabney Cosby, Sr.; Dabney Cosby, Jr.; Heard and Cardwell; John Albert Heisler III
- Architectural style: Queen Anne; Italianate; Greek Revival; Colonial Revival, Craftsman, Commercial Style; Art Deco, Vernacular
- NRHP reference No.: 10001187
- VLR No.: 230-5001

Significant dates
- Added to NRHP: January 28, 2011
- Designated VLR: December 18, 2008

Town of Halifax Court House Historic District is a national historic district located at Halifax, Halifax County, Virginia. The district includes 172 contributing buildings, 1 contributing site, 13 contributing structures, and 1 contributing object (Confederate War Memorial, 1911) in the Town of Halifax. Resources include government, commercial, residential, religious, educational and industrial buildings that date from the early-19th Century to the mid-20th century. Notable buildings include the Rice House (c. 1812), Edmunds/Lewis Office (1869), People's Bank (c. 1911), Beth Car Baptist Church (1892), Christ Episcopal Church (c. 1907), Saint Luke's Christian Methodist Episcopal Church (c. 1907), Dr. Carter House (c. 1900), County Office Building (1915), Town of Halifax Swimming Pool (1930s), Municipal Building/ Fire Station (1950), Halifax Roller Mills (1915), Halifax Planing Mill (c. 1920), Halifax Department Store (1949), and Randolph Theater (c. 1948). Also located in the district is the separately listed Halifax County Courthouse.

It was listed on the National Register of Historic Places in 2011.

== Gallery ==
Town of Halifax Court House Historic District Contributing Buildings

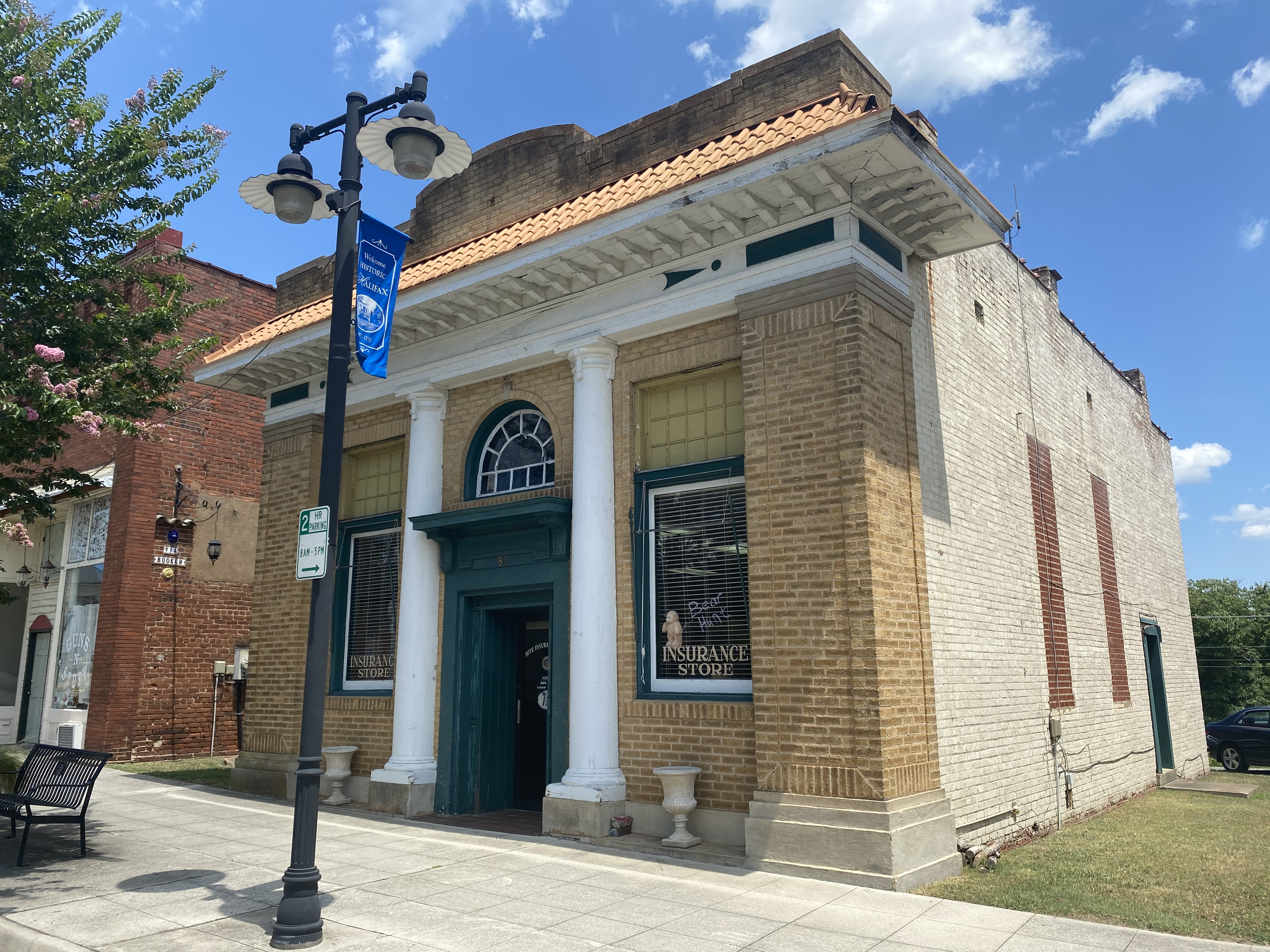
The People’s Bank built in 1911 in Halifax, Virginia.

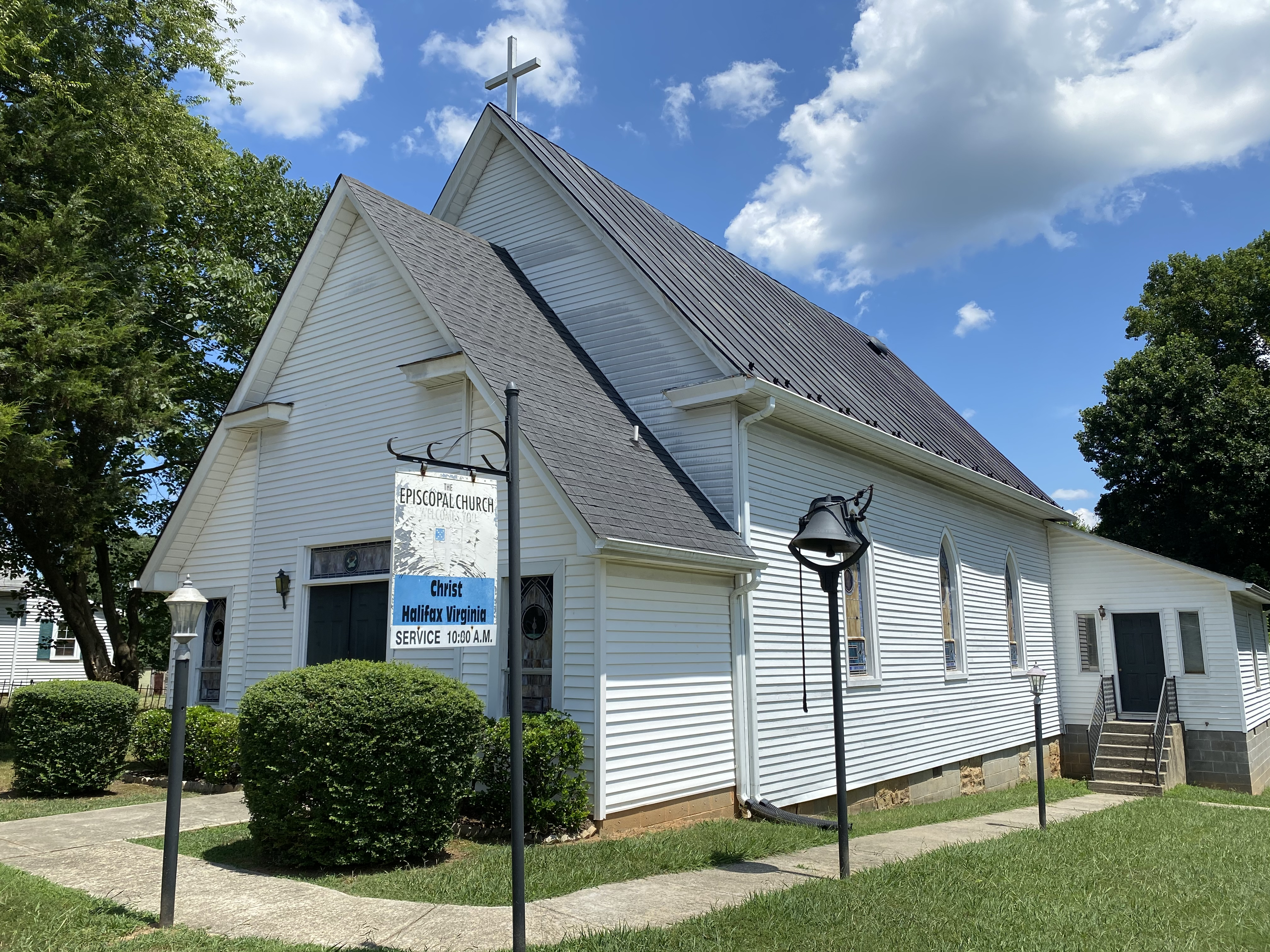
Christ Episcopal Church built in Halifax, Virginia circa 1907.

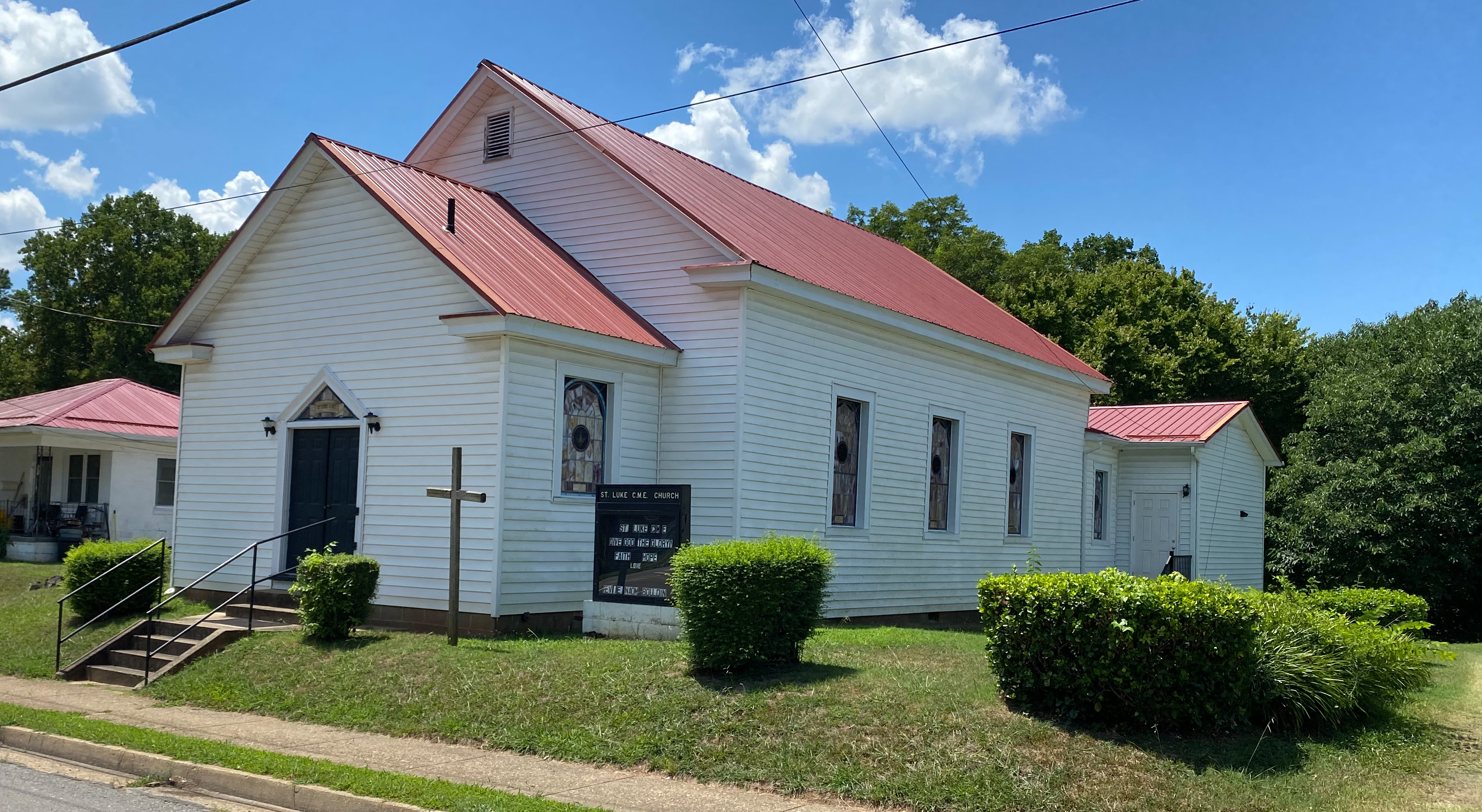
St. Luke’s Methodist Episcopal Christian Church built circa 1907.
