= John W. Riely =

American judge (1839–1900)

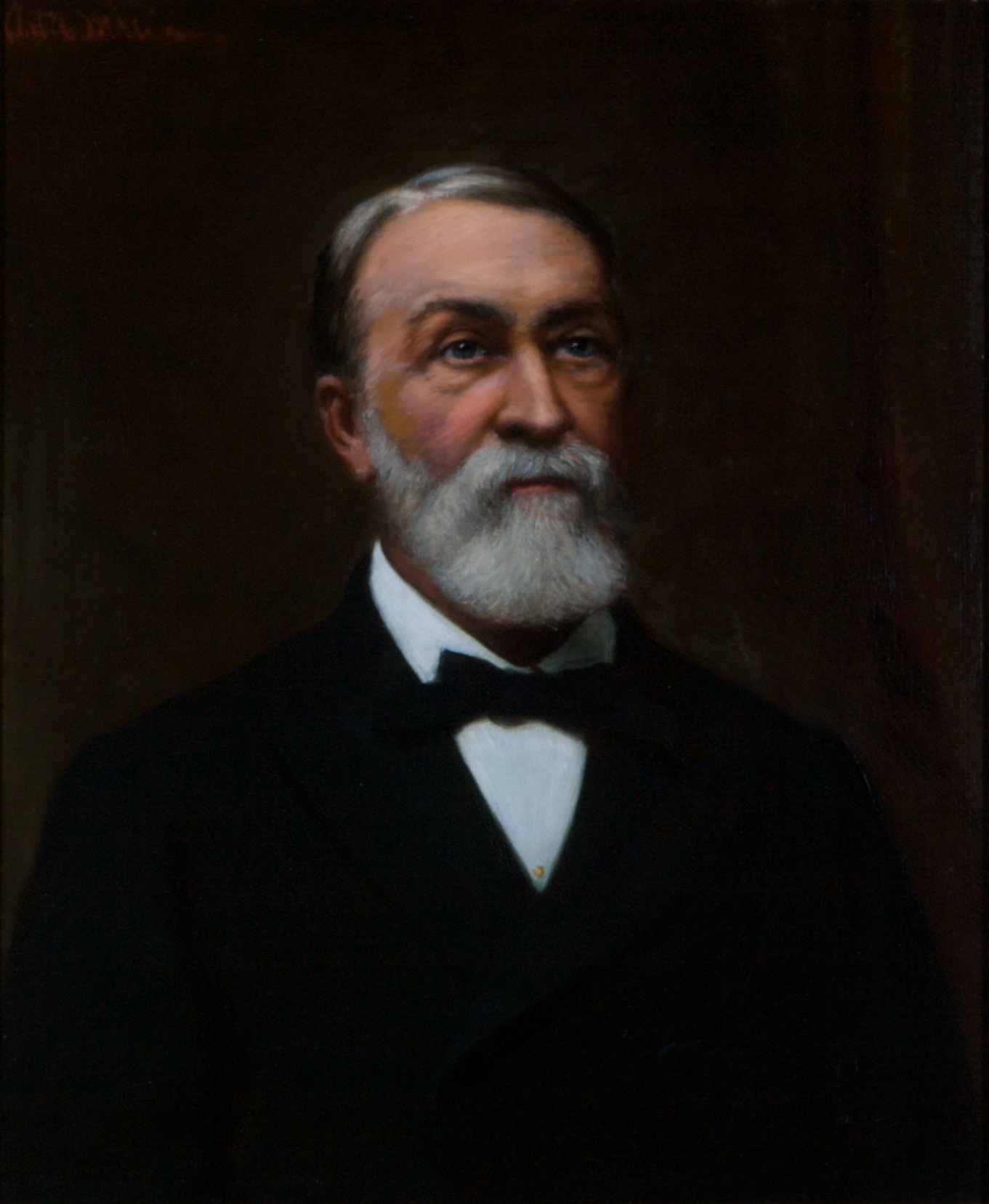
- Riely portrait by Adele Williams
- Born: February 26, 1839; Jefferson County, Virginia, U.S.
- Died: August 20, 1900 (aged 61); Houston, Virginia, U.S.
- Education: Washington College
- Spouse: Emma Carrington (m. 1867)
- Children: 5
- Military career
- Conflicts: American Civil War

John W. Riely (February 26, 1839 – August 20, 1900) was an American lawyer and judge. He served as Commonwealth's Attorney for Halifax County, Virginia and justice of the Supreme Court of Virginia.

== Biography ==
John W. Riely was born in Jefferson County, Virginia (now in West Virginia). He first attended school in Clarke County and then at Middleway in Jefferson County. After this, he attended Winchester Seminary for several years. In order to be able to continue his education, he next clerked in a store in Winchester for two years. Resuming his studies at Brownsville High School in Rockbridge County, he remained there for five months before entering Washington College in 1858. Three years later, in 1861, he graduated.

Before he could start the practice of law, the American Civil War broke out and he joined with other students to form a military company. After the war, he was offered the position of assistant professor of Greek at Washington and Lee but chose, instead, to study law. This he did under Major William S. Barton. He was admitted to the bar in 1867 and became a partner of Judge Barton. In 1868, he moved to Halifax County where he practiced law until 1894. In 1871, he became Commonwealth’s Attorney for Halifax County and held that position until he was elected to the Supreme Court of Appeals in 1895. In 1890, Riely was a charter member of The Virginia Bar Association. Judge Riely was on the bench for five and a half years before his death.

Riely married Emma Carrington, daughter of Henry Carrington, of Ingleside in 1867. They had five children, Mrs. W. Holt Edmunds, Mrs. Henry H. Edmunds, Mrs. Hamit Jordan, Henry C and John W. Jr. He died on August 20, 1900, at the home of his son-in-law in Houston, Virginia.
