= Chamblissburg, Virginia =

Unincorporated community in Virginia, United States

- Unincorporated community
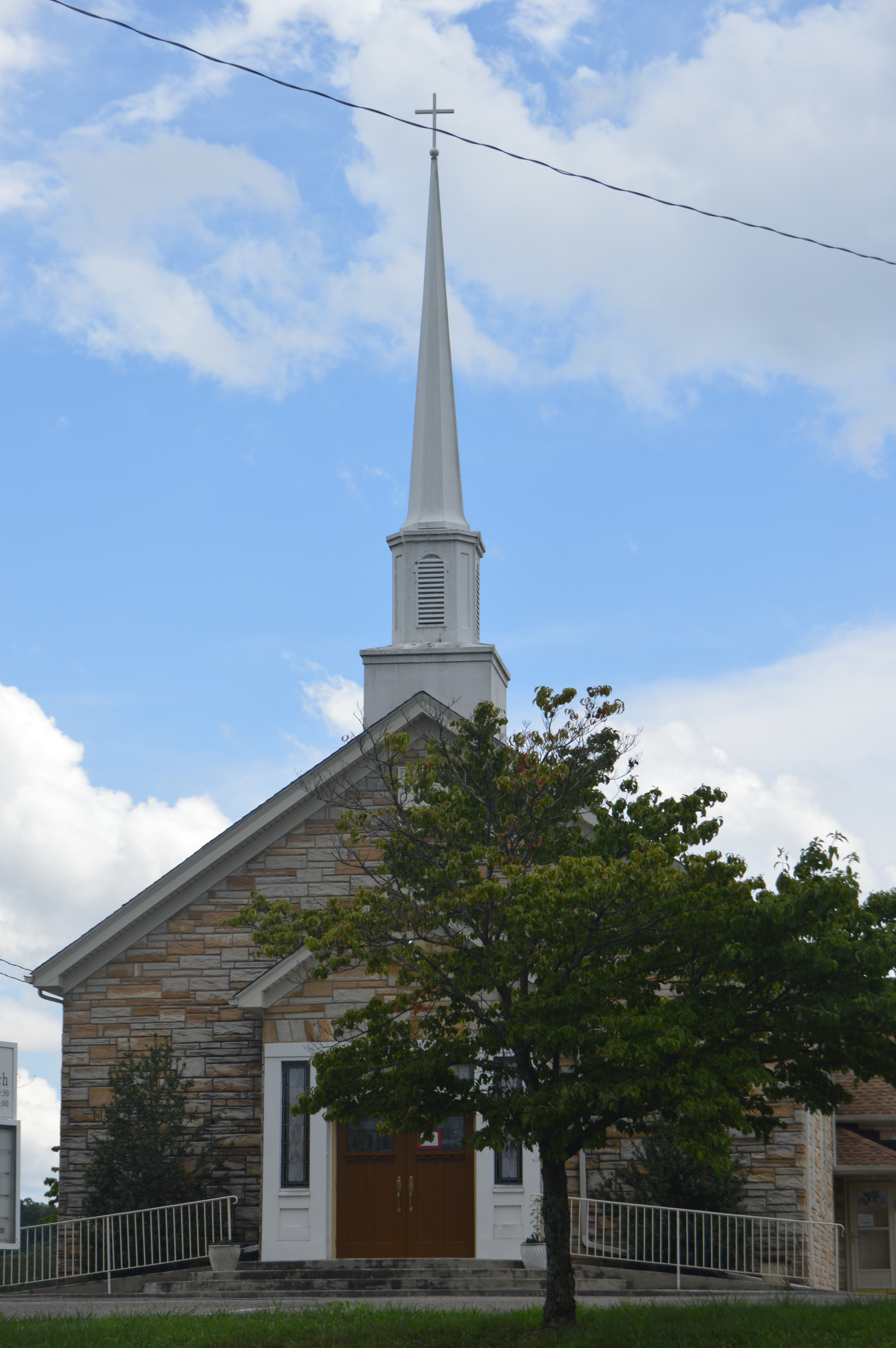
- Parrish Chapel United Methodist Church

- Location within Virginia Location within the United States
- Coordinates: 37°15′16″N 79°42′25″W
- Country: United States
- State: Virginia
- County: Bedford
- Elevation: 1,080 ft (330 m)
- Time zone: UTC-5 (Eastern (EST))
  - Summer (DST): UTC-4 (EDT)
- ZIP Codes: 24095 (Goodview); 24121 (Moneta); 24179 (Vinton)
- Area codes: 540 and 826

Chamblissburg is an unincorporated community in southwestern Bedford County, Virginia, United States. It lies along State Route 24, east of Stewartsville. It is part of the Lynchburg Metropolitan Statistical Area.

== Government ==
The United States Postal Service does not operate a post office within the community. Addresses use a Goodview, Moneta, or Vinton ZIP Code.

== Education ==
The community is served by Bedford County Public Schools. Public school students residing in Chamblissburg are zoned to attend either Goodview Elementary School or Stewartsville Elementary School, Staunton River Middle School, and Staunton River High School.

The closest higher education institutions are located in Bedford and Roanoke.

== Infrastructure ==
=== Public safety ===
Law enforcement is provided by the Bedford County Sheriff's Office. Fire protection is provided by the Stewartsville-Chamblissburg Volunteer Fire Department which operates two fire stations, including one within the community. Emergency medical services are provided by the Chamblissburg Volunteer Rescue Squad which also operates from a station within the community.

=== Transportation ===
==== Air ====
The Roanoke-Blacksburg Regional Airport is the closest airport with commercial service to the community.

==== Highway ====
- Virginia State Route 24 (Stewartsville Road)

==== Rail ====
The closest passenger rail service is located in Roanoke.
