= Stewartsville, Virginia =

- Census-designated place
- Location within Virginia Location within the United States
- Coordinates: 37.2708°N 79.7927°W
- Country: United States
- State: Virginia
- County: Bedford

Area
  - Total: 2.531 sq mi (6.56 km^{2})
  - Land: 2.528 sq mi (6.55 km^{2})
  - Water: 0.003 sq mi (0.0078 km^{2})

Population (2020)
  - Total: 533
  - Density: 211/sq mi (81.4/km^{2})
- Time zone: UTC-5 (Eastern (EST))
  - Summer (DST): UTC-4 (EDT)
- ZIP Codes: 24095 (Goodview); 24179 (Vinton)
- Area codes: 540 and 826
- FIPS code: 51-75504
- GNIS feature ID: 2807405

Stewartsville is a census-designated place (CDP) in southwestern Bedford County, Virginia, United States. The population as of the 2020 census was 533. The CDP is located along State Route 24, between Vinton and Chamblissburg. It is part of the Lynchburg Metropolitan Statistical Area.

== Geography ==
According to the United States Census Bureau, the CDP has a total area of 2.531 square miles (6.56 km^{2}), of which 0.003 square mile (0.003 km^{2}) is water.

== Demographics ==
Historical population
Census	Pop.	Note	%±
2020	533		—
Source: U.S. Census Bureau

Stewartsville first appeared as a census designated place in the 2020 U.S. census.

=== 2020 census ===
As of the census of 2020, there were 533 people residing in the CDP. There were 245 housing units. The racial makeup of the CDP was 95.3% White, 1.7% African American or Black, 0.0% American Indian, 0.2% Asian, 0.0% Pacific Islander, 0.0% from other races, and 2.8% from two or more races. Hispanic or Latino of any race were 1.1% of the population.

== Government ==
The United States Postal Service does not operate a post office within the CDP. Addresses use a Vinton or Goodview ZIP Code.

== Education ==
The CDP is served by Bedford County Public Schools. Public school students residing in Stewartsville are zoned to attend either Goodview Elementary School or Stewartsville Elementary School, Staunton River Middle School, and Staunton River High School.

The closest higher education institutions are located in Roanoke.

== Infrastructure ==
=== Public safety ===
Law enforcement is provided by the Bedford County Sheriff's Office. Fire protection is provided by the Stewartsville-Chamblissburg Volunteer Fire Department, which operates two fire stations, including one within the CDP. Emergency medical services are provided by the Bedford County Department of Fire and Rescue and the Stewartsville Volunteer Rescue Squad, which operate from a station within the CDP.

== Transportation ==
=== Air ===
The Roanoke-Blacksburg Regional Airport is the closest airport with commercial service to the CDP.

=== Highway ===
- Virginia State Route 24 (Stewartsville Road)

=== Rail ===
The Norfolk Southern operated Altavista District is located south of the CDP. The closest passenger rail service is located in Roanoke.
