= Thaxton, Virginia =

Unincorporated community in Virginia, United States

- Unincorporated community
- Location within Virginia Location within the United States
- Coordinates: 37°21′11″N 79°36′59″W
- Country: United States
- State: Virginia
- County: Bedford
- Elevation: 948 ft (289 m)
- Time zone: UTC-5 (Eastern (EST))
  - Summer (DST): UTC-4 (EDT)
- ZIP Code: 24174 (Thaxton); 24523 (Bedford)
- Area codes: 540 and 826
- GNIS feature ID: 1493697

Thaxton is an unincorporated community in western Bedford County, Virginia, United States. The community is located along U.S. Route 460 between Bedford and Montvale. It is part of the Lynchburg Metropolitan Statistical Area.

== History ==
Thomas Methodist Episcopal Chapel was listed on the National Register of Historic Places in 2004.

Thaxton was the site of a deadly train accident on July 2, 1889 that killed at least 18 and injured 21. The accident, caused when a passenger train derailed over a section of track that had been washed away by unusually heavy rains, was one of the deadliest railroad accidents in Virginia's history. A memorial was erected later that year in Cleveland, Tennessee in memory of three of the victims, all from prominent families in that city, who were on their way to attend the 1889 World's Fair in Paris. A historical marker was placed near the site of the accident in 2015.

== Government ==
The United States Postal Service operates the Thaxton Post Office within the community, although portions of the community have a Bedford ZIP Code.

== Education ==
The community is served by Bedford County Public Schools. Public school students residing in Thaxton are zoned to attend either Bedford Elementary School or Montvale Elementary School, Liberty Middle School, and Liberty High School. Thaxton Elementary School, an elementary school operated by Bedford County Public Schools, previously served the community before being closed in 2015. The former school site was sold to a private business in 2017.

A branch campus of Central Virginia Community College in nearby Bedford is the closest higher education institution to the community.

== Infrastructure ==
The transmitter for the Lynchburg-Roanoke market ABC television network affiliate WSET-TV is located approximately 2.8 miles SSE of the community center.

=== Public safety ===
Law enforcement is provided by the Bedford County Sheriff's Office. Fire protection is provided by the Bedford Fire Department and Montvale Volunteer Fire Department. Emergency medical services are provided by the Montvale Volunteer Rescue Squad and Bedford County Department of Fire and Rescue.

== Transportation ==
=== Air ===
The New London Airport is the closest public-use airport to the community. The Lynchburg Regional Airport and Roanoke-Blacksburg Regional Airport are the closest airports with commercial service to the community.

=== Highways ===
- U.S. Route 221 (West Lynchburg Salem Turnpike)
- U.S. Route 460 (West Lynchburg Salem Turnpike)

=== Rail ===
The Norfolk Southern Blue Ridge District runs through the community. The closest passenger rail service is located in Roanoke and Lynchburg.
