= Villamont, Virginia =

Unincorporated community in Virginia, United States

- Unincorporated community
- Location within Virginia Location within the United States
- Coordinates: 37°23′43″N 79°46′34″W
- Country: United States
- State: Virginia
- County: Bedford
- Elevation: 1,243 ft (379 m)
- Time zone: UTC−5 (Eastern (EST))
  - Summer (DST): UTC−4 (EDT)
- ZIP Code: 24064 (Blue Ridge); 24178 (Villamont)
- Area codes: 540 and 826
- GNIS feature ID: 1500259

Villamont is an unincorporated community in western Bedford County, Virginia, United States. Villamont is located along U.S. Route 460 between Blue Ridge and Montvale. It is part of the Lynchburg Metropolitan Statistical Area.

== Geography ==
Villamont is located 15.1 miles (24.3 km) west-northwest of Bedford and 13.0 miles (20.9 km) northeast of Roanoke.

== Government ==
Villamont had a post office until it closed on January 20, 2007. The ZIP Code for Villamont was 24178. Addresses within Villamont now use a Blue Ridge ZIP Code.

== Education ==
The community is served by Bedford County Public Schools. Public school students residing in Villamont are zoned to attend Montvale Elementary School, Liberty Middle School, and Liberty High School.

The closest higher education institutions to the community are located in nearby Bedford and Roanoke.

== Infrastructure ==
=== Public safety ===
Law enforcement is provided by the Bedford County Sheriff's Office. Fire protection is provided by the Montvale Volunteer Fire Department. Emergency medical services are provided by the Montvale Volunteer Rescue Squad.

=== Transportation ===
==== Air ====
The Roanoke-Blacksburg Regional Airport is the closest airport with commercial service to the community.

==== Highways ====
- U.S. Route 221 (West Lynchburg Salem Turnpike)
- U.S. Route 460 (West Lynchburg Salem Turnpike)

==== Rail ====
The Norfolk Southern operated Blue Ridge District runs through the community. The closest passenger rail service is located in Roanoke.
