= Buford's Gap =

- Interactive map of Buford's Gap
- Elevation: 1,240 ft (380 m)
- Traversed by: U.S. Highway 460

Third Approach
- Location: Bedford County, Virginia, United States
- Range: Blue Ridge Mountains
- Coordinates: 37°23′37″N 79°46′53″W

Buford's Gap is a wind gap in the Blue Ridge Mountains in Bedford County, Virginia. Buford's Gap was the original crossing of the Blue Ridge Mountains for the Virginia and Tennessee Railroad, later the Norfolk and Western Railway, a precursor of today's Norfolk Southern Railway system. It was the site of a battle in 1864 during the American Civil War. U.S. Route 460 also passes through the gap.

== Prehistory ==
In pre-history, the Cherokee had a seat on the Peaks of the Otter nearby. A main trail went through Buford's Gap and Villamont, Virginia, roughly along the present highway to Roanoke, Virginia. Relics have been unearthed in the Goose Creek Valley, and tomahawk heads and stone arrowheads were found east of the village. The tribes may have traveled through Buford's Gap and on to either Tennessee or North Carolina along the Carolina Road and the Great Indian Warpath.

== Transportation ==
The Buford's Gap and Buchanan Turnpike went through Buford's Gap. The turnpike was started in 1851 and completed in 1855, and the president and major stockholder was Paschal Buford.

Paschal Buford (February 14, 1791- 1875) was the son of Henry Buford, who along with his three brothers, Thomas, James and William, first came to Bedford County about 1754. Paschal traded in real estate, farming, donated land for several churches, operated some mills and had the contract to carry mail to Botetourt County, Virginia. Married in 1820, in 1822 he built the brick mansion Locust Level.
