= Bedford Public Library System =

- Location: US
- Branches: 6

Access and use
- Population served: 75,516

Other information
- Website: Bedford Public Library System

Bedford Public Library System serves Bedford county in Virginia. The library system is within Region 2 of Virginia Library Association.

== Service area ==
According to the FY 2014 Institute of Museum and Library Services Data Catalog, the Bedford Public Library System has a service area population of 75,516 with 1 central library and 5 branch libraries.

== Branches ==
- Bedford Central Library (Bedford)
- Big Island Library (Big Island)
- Forest Library (Forest)
- Moneta/SML Library (Moneta)
- Montvale Library (Montvale)
- Stewartsville Library (Vinton)
