= Bedford Museum & Genealogical Library =

Museum in USA

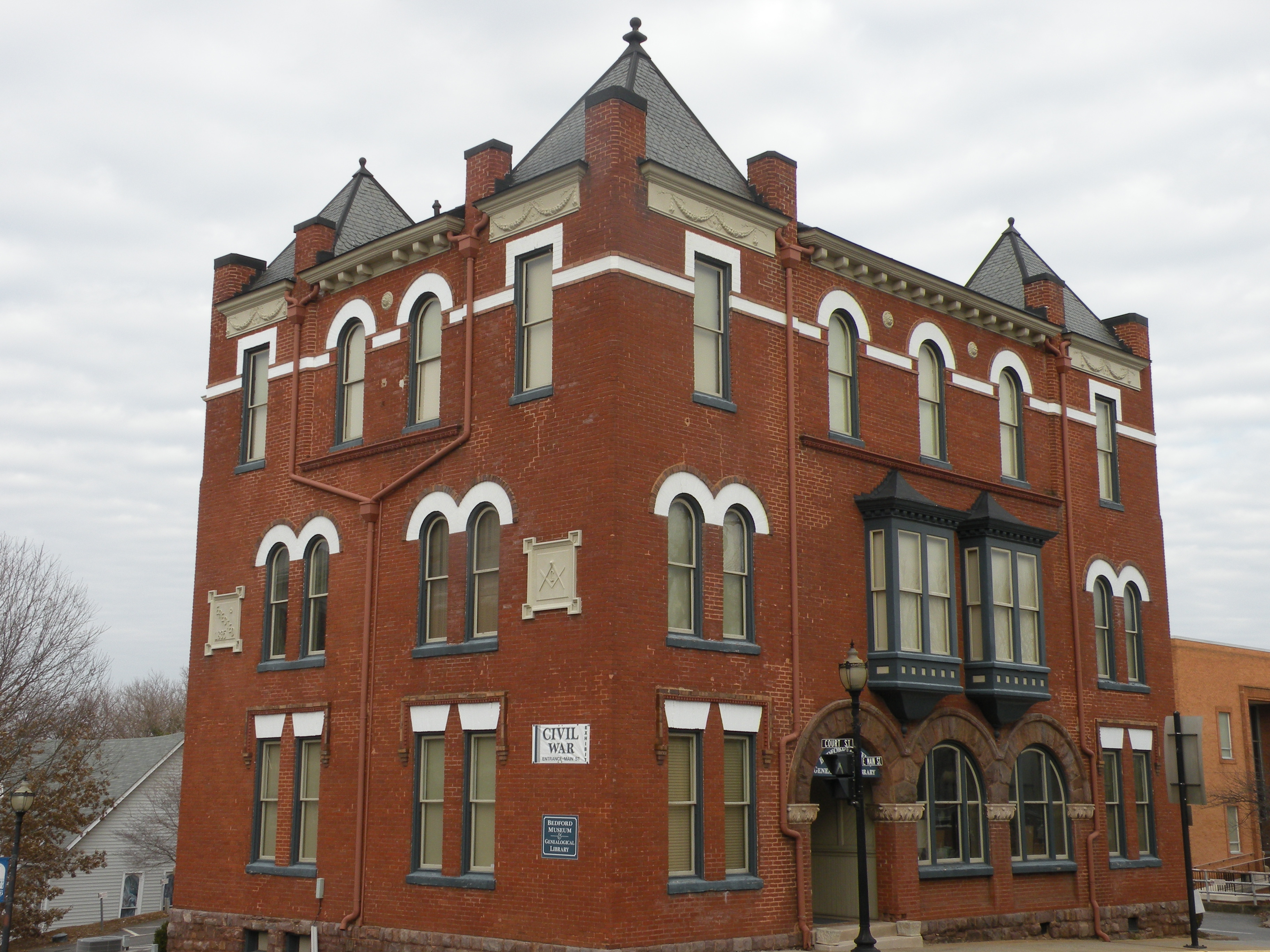
- Originally built by the Liberty Lodge #95 A.F & A.M., it is now the home of the Bedford Museum & Genealogical Library.
- Interactive map of the Bedford Museum & Genealogical Library area

General information
- Location: 201 E. Main St., Bedford, Virginia, USA
- Coordinates: 37.334184°N 79.521933°W
- Relocated: 1979

Technical details
- Floor count: 3

Website
- www.bedfordvamuseum.org

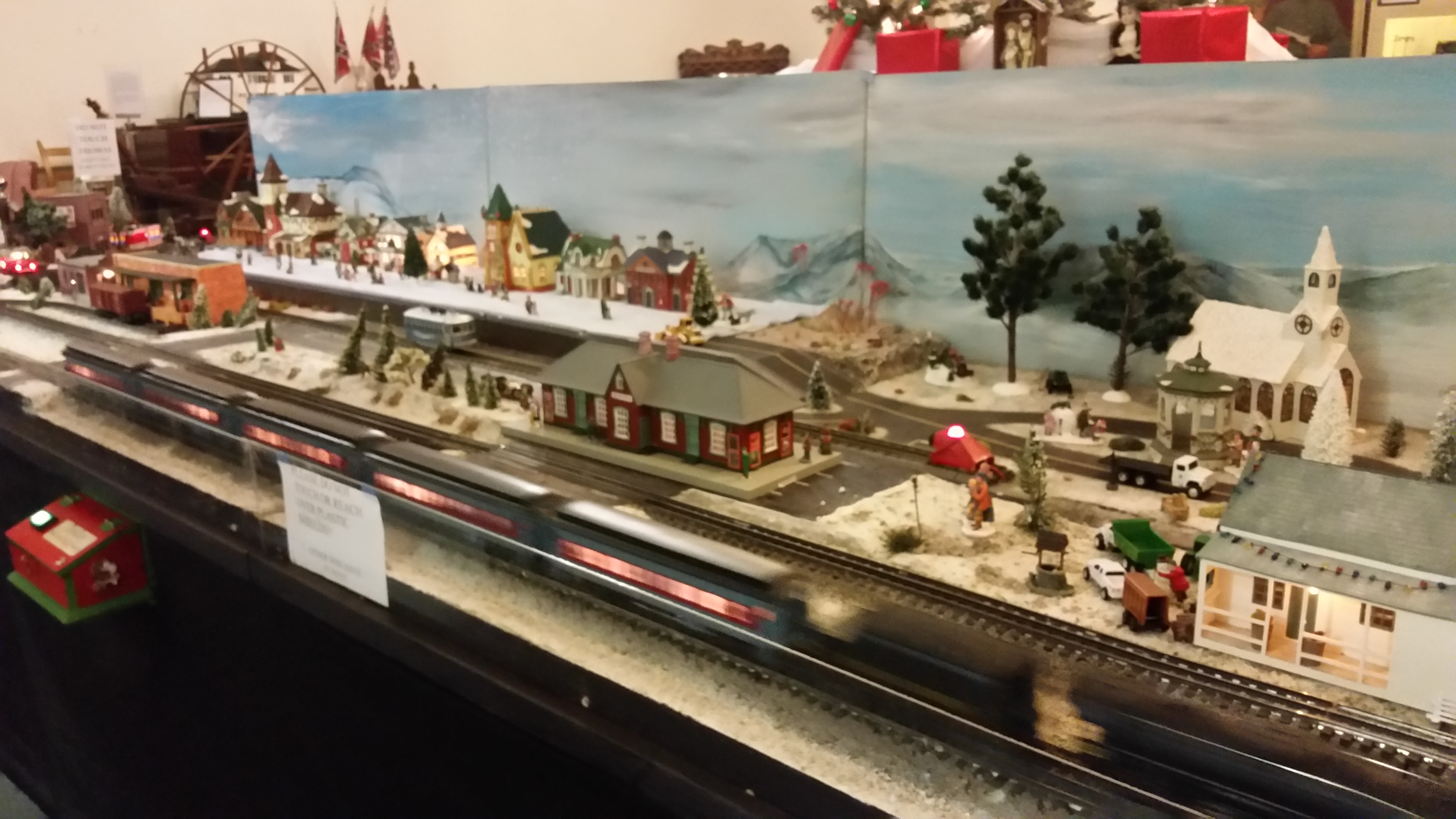
The Polar Express in front of the Village in the model train layout at the Bedford Museum & Genealogical Library

The Bedford Museum & Genealogical Library is the county museum and genealogical library for Bedford County, Virginia It was started in 1932 by the General William R. Terry chapter of the United Daughters of the Confederacy and the Peaks of Otter chapter of the National Society Daughters of the American Revolution. It was in multiple locations in the town of Bedford, VA including the Courthouse and the library. It finally found its permanent home in 1979 when it moved into the former Masonic Hall for Liberty Lodge #95. It is part of the Bedford Historic District and is known as Bedford Masonic Hall on that Wiki page. It is located at 201 E. Main St. Bedford, VA.

== Annual Events ==
The Bedford Museum & Genealogical Library holds several events throughout the year including: An Annual train layout, Fridays at the Museum summer kids program, and Women's History Month essay contest for children.

=== Train Layout ===
The Bedford Museum is home to an annual O Gauge train layout on its third floor. Children are entertained as the train goes past villages and across a trestle and through a tunnel. They can also run a trolley that goes back and forth in the village. During the two weeks of Christmas Break, the Polar Express runs on the track as well. There are other interactive train possibilities as well, depending on the year.

=== Fridays at the Museum ===
Every summer the Bedford Museum & Genealogical Library hosts a weekly summer activity that is geared to children coming out of 2nd to 6th grades. The program is every Friday afternoon during the summer and children learn about local history and its interaction with national and sometimes international connections. Some of the activities have included a visit from the Monancan Tribe and the Bedford County Sheriff. There have also been trips to Avenel and the Avoca Museum. The Museum's program has seen great results with some of the children that participated in the program to get Passed Advanced in history on their VA SOL.

=== Women's History Month Essay Contest ===
Every February the Bedford Museum & Genealogical Library hosts an annual Women's History Month Essay Contest open to students in the second to eighth grades. Students must write about a woman who lived during that years theme (American Revolution, Civil War, etc.) and why they admired them. Grand Prize winners are awarded $50 and 1st place and runners up get an award as well.

== Monthly ==
The Museum holds a Genealogy and History Forum on the 2nd Saturday of every month from February to November. Some of the speakers share personal genealogy stories, others talk about their experiences like Carl Overstreet, who was the first U2 pilot to fly over Soviet Air Space.

It also offers a free beginning genealogy class every month from February to November that offers tips and advice for students just getting started in Genealogy.

== Weekly ==
The Museum holds free weekly Bluegrass Jams on the third floor most Friday nights from 7 to 9 pm.

== Displays ==
Exhibits displayed in the three-floor Museum feature African Americans, Native Americans, World War I, World War II, Korean War, Vietnam War, Operation Enduring Freedom, Co. A 1/116 29th Division (AKA Bedford Boys), Civil War, American Revolution, as well as household furniture. The changing exhibit room has highlighted local Manufacturing like Piedmont/Smyth Label and Lacey Putney, the longest serving Delegate in all of Virginia's History.

== Genealogy Library ==
The first floor is the home location for the Genealogy Library. It features over 1,600 books and over 1,000 files on family names and local history.
