= Jefferson Forest High School =

Coordinates: 37°22′31″N 79°18′11″W

Location
- 1 Cavalier Circle; Forest, Virginia 24551

Information
- School type: Public, high school
- Founded: 1972
- School district: Bedford County Public Schools
- NCES District ID: 5100360
- Superintendent: William Dupere
- NCES School ID: 510036002175
- Principal: Ben Martin
- Teaching staff: 74.40 (on an FTE basis)
- Grades: 9–12
- Enrollment: 1,282 (2024-2025)
- Student to teacher ratio: 17.23
- Language: English
- Colors: Red, black, and white
- Athletics conference: Seminole District
- Mascot: Cavalier
- Rivals: Brookville High School; Staunton River High School; Liberty High School; E. C. Glass High School; Heritage High School; Liberty Christian Academy
- Feeder schools: Forest Middle School
- Website: https://bedfordjfhs.sharpschool.net/

Jefferson Forest High School (JFHS) is one of the three high schools in Bedford County, Virginia. Jefferson Forest High School was first opened in 1972. The school's Principal is Ben Martin.

== History ==
JFHS is designed with four levels and houses over sixty-six classrooms. In 2008–2009, the school was renovated and added two new science and math hallways. In addition to regular classrooms, there is a library, weight room, gymnasium, auditorium, home economics room, industrial arts facility, band room, chorus room, and an art room. Jefferson Forest High School's past enrollment in 2006–2008 is 1,250 students and 1,375 in 2008–2009. There are 180 days in the school year. Each day starts at 8:45 AM and goes until 3:45 PM with seven different periods.

In 2018 and 2019, several controversial incidents occurred, including two where students displayed a Confederate flag and shared photos during the school's Spirit Week. This led to discussion at the school board level, including a proposal to ban the display of "any symbols of racism or oppression".

== Athletics ==
- Soccer – State Champions 2011 (Boys), 2017 (Girls); Runners-up in 2004, 2021 and 2024 State Semifinalists in 1999, 2000, 2006, 2009, 2012
- Football – State Runners-up 1979 & 1991; State Champions Division 3 1992 and 1993; Class 4, Region D Champions 2025
- Girls Volleyball – State Champions 1997, State Runners-Up in 1984, 1996 and 2003
- Outdoor Track – State Champions 1999, 2000, and 2001, triple crown champs
- Baseball – State Champions 1988; State runners-up 1989; state runner up 2015
- Concert Band – Virginia State Honor Band; National Concert Festival in Indianapolis, Indiana, 2012, 2018; Gold Medal at Carnegie Hall, 2017, 2026
- Marching Band – 2018 VMBC State Champions Group 4A, 2021 VMBC State Champions Group 3A, 2025 VMBC Commonwealth Cup 3rd Place
- Swimming – State 3rd place 2009, Boys 4A State Champions 2016–17 season
- Theatre – State Runners-up 2012, 2014, 2016, 2022, 2023 Class 4 State Champions 2019, 2020, 2021, 2025
- Film – State Champs: (Commercial/PSA) 2018, (Animation) 2022, (Commercial) 2023, 2026 Audience Choice: (Experimental) 2019, 2022, (Animation) 2022, 2026
- Improv – VTA State Champions 2015, 2016, 2019, 2024, 2025
- Competition Cheerleading – State Champs 2003
- Cross country – Seminole District Champions 1994–2014, Girl's State Champions 2000, 2001, 2013, 2014, Boys' State Champions 2020
- Diving – State Champion 2019
- Scholastic Bowl – Class 4 State 2nd place (2021)

== Notable alumni ==
- Anthony Poindexter (born 1976), All American and NCAA Hall of Fame safety at University of Virginia; former special teams member for the Baltimore Ravens: former coach at Virginia, UConn, Purdue, Penn State; current coach at Tennessee
- Jake Grove (born 1980), All-American offensive lineman at Virginia Tech; former center for the Oakland Raiders and Miami Dolphins
- Katie Cousins (born 1996), Gatorade National Player of the Year; two time All-American at Tennessee, SEC all-freshman at Tennessee, three time All-SEC at Tennessee, midfielder at Knattspyrnufélagið Þróttur
- Rashad Jennings (born 1985), attended Jefferson Forest as a freshman before transferring to Liberty Christian Academy; former Pittsburg and Liberty running back; #23 retired for Liberty; former running back for the Jacksonville Jaguars, Oakland Raiders, and New York Giants
