= Anthony Poindexter =

American football player and coach (born 1976)

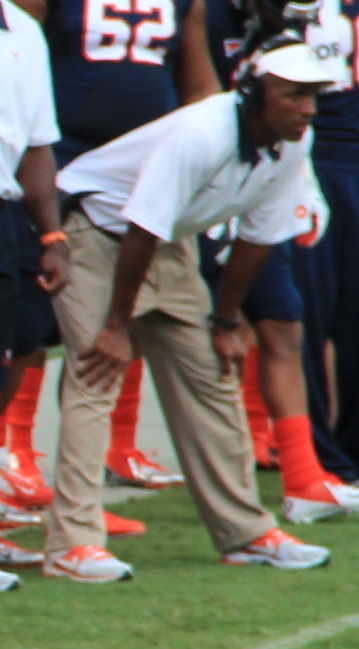
- Poindexter in 2012

Tennessee Volunteers
- Title: Co-defensive coordinator & safeties coach

Personal information
- Born: July 28, 1976 (age 50); Lynchburg, Virginia, U.S.
- Listed height: 6 ft 0 in (1.83 m)
- Listed weight: 220 lb (100 kg)

Career information
- High school: Forest (VA) Jefferson Forest
- College: Virginia
- NFL draft: 1999: 7th round, 216th overall pick

Career history

Playing
- Baltimore Ravens (1999–2000); Cleveland Browns (2001)*
- * Offseason or practice squad member only

Coaching
- Virginia (2003–2013); Graduate assistant (2003); Running backs coach (2004–2005); Running backs coach & assistant special teams (2006–2008); Defensive backs coach & assistant special teams (2009); Safeties coach & special teams (2010–2012); Safeties coach (2013); UConn (2014–2016) Defensive coordinator & safeties coach; Purdue (2017–2020) Co-defensive coordinator & safeties coach; Penn State (2021–2025) Co-defensive coordinator & safeties coach; Tennessee (2026–present) Co-defensive coordinator & safeties coach

Awards and highlights
- Super Bowl champion (XXXV); Consensus All-American (1998); First-team All-American (1997); ACC Defensive Player of the Year (1998); ACC Brian Piccolo Award (1998); 3× First-team All-ACC (1996, 1997, 1998); Dudley Award (1997); Virginia Cavaliers Jersey No. 3 retired
- Stats at Pro Football Reference
- College Football Hall of Fame

Anthony Scott Poindexter (born July 28, 1976) is an American football coach and former safety, who is the current defensive backs coach and co-defensive coordinator for the Tennessee Volunteers. He is the former safeties coach for the Penn State Nittany Lions. He played college football at Virginia from 1995 to 1998 for head coach George Welsh, and earned All-American honors. He then played in the National Football League (NFL) for the Baltimore Ravens and Cleveland Browns from 1999 to 2001.

== Early life ==
Poindexter, a native of Bedford County, Virginia, attended New London Academy, Forest Middle School, and Jefferson Forest High School in Forest, Virginia. In middle school, he led his team to an undefeated season as quarterback. In high school, Anthony excelled in football, baseball, and basketball. As quarterback and safety, Poindexter led the Cavaliers to back-to-back Division 3 football championships in 1992 and 1993, defeating Matoaca High School in both finals. Poindexter earned first-team all-state honors as a junior and senior. He was selected as the 1993 AP Group AA Player of the Year as a senior. Poindexter was drafted by the Florida Marlins of Major League Baseball during his senior season of high school.

== College career ==
Poindexter accepted an athletic scholarship to attend the University of Virginia and he played safety for coach George Welsh's Virginia Cavaliers football team from 1995 to 1998. He was compared to NFL players such as Ronnie Lott, for his hard-hitting style. As a redshirt freshman in 1995, Poindexter teamed with fellow defensive back Adrian Burnim in one of the most famous plays in Cavalier history as the two stopped Florida State's running back Warrick Dunn inches from the goal line, defeating the second ranked Seminoles 32-28. In 1996, he made a school record with 98 tackles and as a junior in 1997 he finished with 78. As a junior, Poindexter had the choice between declaring himself for the 1998 NFL draft or staying in college for his senior year. Draft experts projected that he would likely be drafted in the first round, but Poindexter stayed at Virginia for his senior season but watched his draft stock plummet as injuries corrupted his senior season. The Cavaliers were expected to have a very strong team and were ranked as high as the top ten. In the first seven games of the season, Poindexter made 73 tackles, two sacks and three interceptions.

In a game against N.C. State in 1998, Poindexter made a tackle on wide receiver Chris Coleman but he twisted his left leg and tore his ACL and two other ligaments. His season at Virginia was over, and possibly his professional career; he could not participate in the NFL Scouting Combine or the Virginia Pro Day.

Poindexter's No. 3 [UVA] jersey was retired on October 10, 2009.

Poindexter was named to the College Football Hall of Fame in 2020.

== Professional career ==
His chances of getting drafted were slim and depended on the teams doctors' opinions. The Baltimore Ravens took a chance on Poindexter by drafting him in the seventh round with the 216th overall pick. In his rookie season, he was placed on the injured reserve list, but he returned for the Ravens' championship season in 2000. He played in 10 games on special teams where he caused one forced fumble. He did not play in Super Bowl XXXV, however. Shortly after the game, he was released, but was picked up by the Cleveland Browns in June 2001. He was released again in September that same year and never played another NFL game.

== Coaching career ==
After the end of his NFL career in 2001, Poindexter returned to his alma mater as a graduate assistant. He eventually made his way up the coaching totem pole and was the safeties coach at the end of his tenure at the University of Virginia.

In 2014, Poindexter accepted a position at the University of Connecticut as the defensive coordinator/safeties coach. Poindexter was dismissed along with the rest of the defensive coaching staff at the end of the 2016 season.

In 2017, Poindexter was hired as the co-defensive coordinator (along with Nick Holt) and safeties coach. Purdue made two bowl games in his tenure as defensive coordinator.

In 2021, Poindexter was hired as safeties coach at Penn State. At the end of the 2023 regular season, PSU defensive coordinator, Manny Diaz, left to take the head coaching position at Duke. Poindexter was then appointed as interim co-defensive coordinator for Penn State's appearance in the Peach Bowl.
