= Liberty High School (Bedford, Virginia) =

Coordinates: 37°22′16″N 79°29′54″W

Location
- 100 Minutemen Drive; Bedford, Virginia 24523

Information
- School type: Public, high school
- Founded: 1964
- Locale: Rural, Fringe
- School district: Bedford County Public Schools
- NCES District ID: 5100360
- Superintendent: Marc Bergin
- NCES School ID: 510036000151
- Principal: Justin Tucker
- Teaching staff: 54.40 (on an FTE basis)
- Grades: 9–12
- Enrollment: 708 (2024–25)
- Student to teacher ratio: 13.01
- Language: English
- Colors: Red, White and Navy Blue
- Mascot: Minutemen
- Feeder schools: Liberty Middle School
- District Schools: Jefferson Forest High School, Staunton River High School
- Athletic conferences: Dogwood District
- Website: https://bedfordlhs.sharpschool.net/

Liberty High School is one of the three high schools in Bedford County, Virginia. Liberty High School opened in 1964. Its mascot is the "Minuteman." School colors are red, white and navy blue. The school serves students from Villamont, Thaxton, Montvale, Big Island and Bedford. The principal of Liberty High School is Justin Tucker.

== History ==
In 1964, when smaller schools were consolidated into one, Liberty High School came into existence with William N. Lee at its head as principal.

Following the 2018-19 School Year, long-time principal. Kathy Dills retired for medical reasons. The assistant principal and principal positions have changed almost annually ever since.

== Student body ==
The 2009-2010 enrollment was 1,004 in grades 9–12. Racial makeup of the school is approx. 78% White, 21% Black, and 1% other.

== Academics ==
Approximately 80% of the students who go to LHS graduate. 52% of the 2004 graduates continued their formal education beyond high school. Liberty High School participates in an Early College program with Central Virginia Community College where students apply to receive their junior and senior classes at the college itself, thus earning them a two-year degree before they graduate high school. Several students also attend the Central Virginia Governor's School in Lynchburg, VA. In 2015, Glen Field received the Jefferson Scholarship, of which less than 2% of those nominated are selected.

== Athletics ==
Liberty competes in the Virginia High School League (VHSL) Class 2, Region C, Dogwood District. The school has won multiple VHSL state championships in team sports.

Team state championships

- Football, VHSL state champions (2002), setting a then-record 529 rushing yards in the championship game against New Kent High School
- Boys’ basketball, VHSL state champions (1995–96, 1996–97)
- Baseball, VHSL state champions (1977)
- Girls’ softball, VHSL state champions (2019)
- Liberty’s football program was ranked among the 19th best team of the decade in the State of Virginia by virginiapreps.com in 2008.
