= Thomas Chapel =

Thomas Chapel may refer to:

- Thomas Chapel, Pembrokeshire, a place in Wales, see Kilgetty/Begelly
- Thomas' Methodist Episcopal Chapel, also known as Thomas Chapel, a Methodist chapel and cemetery near Chapeltown in Kent County, Delaware
- Thomas Methodist Episcopal Chapel, also known as Thomas Chapel, a Methodist Episcopal church in Thaxton, Bedford County, Virginia
