= Wind gap =

Topographic gap made by a former waterway

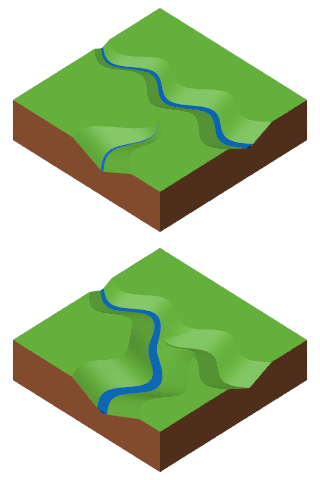
Stream capture by headward erosion, leaving a wind gap

A wind gap (or air gap) is a gap through which a waterway once flowed that is now dry as a result of stream capture. A water gap is a similar feature, but one in which a waterway still flows. Water gaps and wind gaps often provide routes which, due to their gently inclined profile, are suitable for trails, roads, and railroads through mountainous terrain.

Examples of wind gaps in the Blue Ridge Mountains of Virginia include Swift Run Gap, Rockfish Gap, and Buford's Gap. The last was the original crossing of the Blue Ridge Mountains near Bedford for the Virginia and Tennessee Railroad, later the Norfolk and Western Railway, a precursor of today's Norfolk Southern Railway system. Another wind gap with substantial importance in U.S. history is the Cumberland Gap near the junction of Kentucky, Virginia, and Tennessee.

== Gallery ==
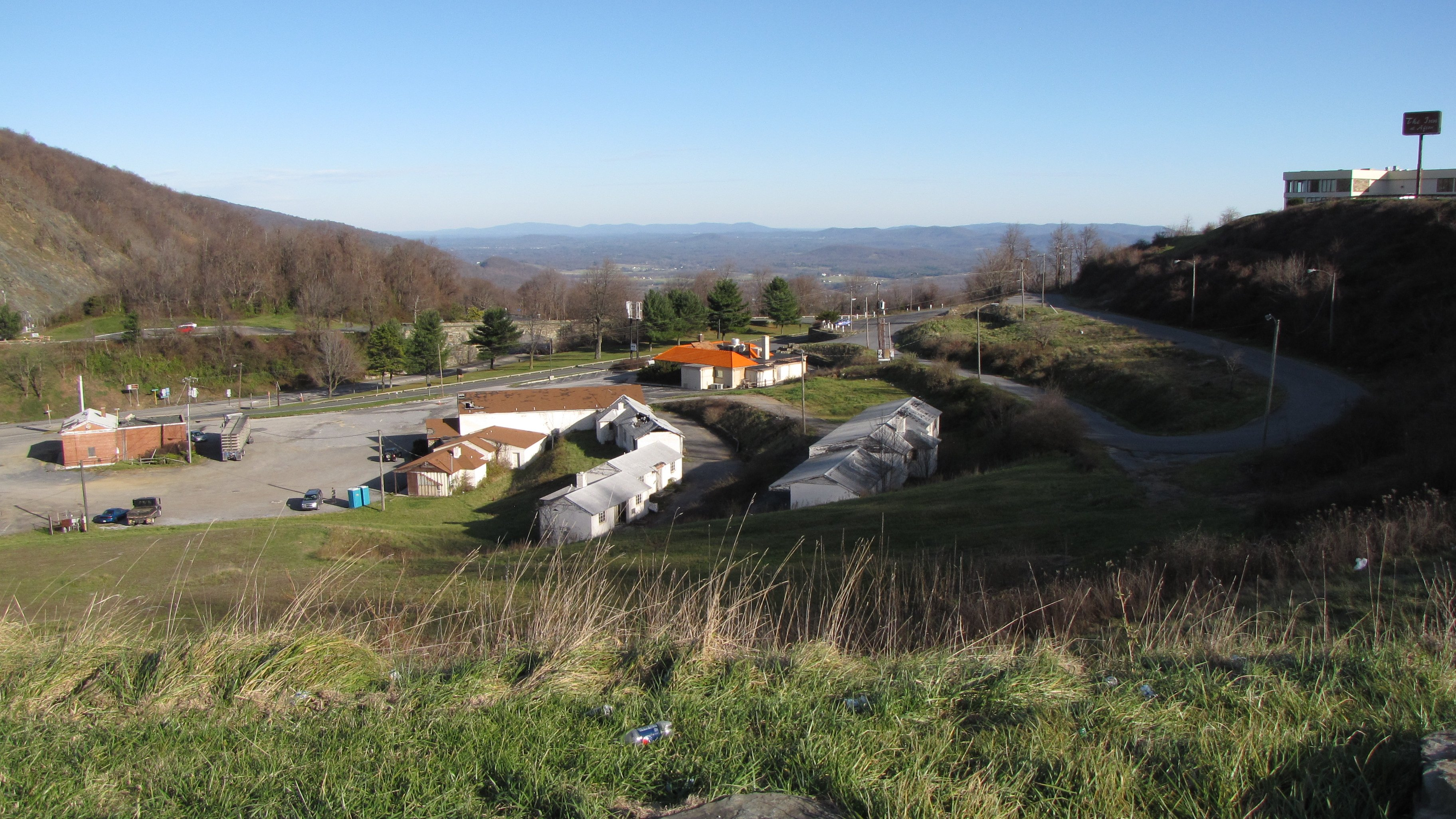
Wind gap Rockfish Gap, Blue Ridge Mountains, Virginia

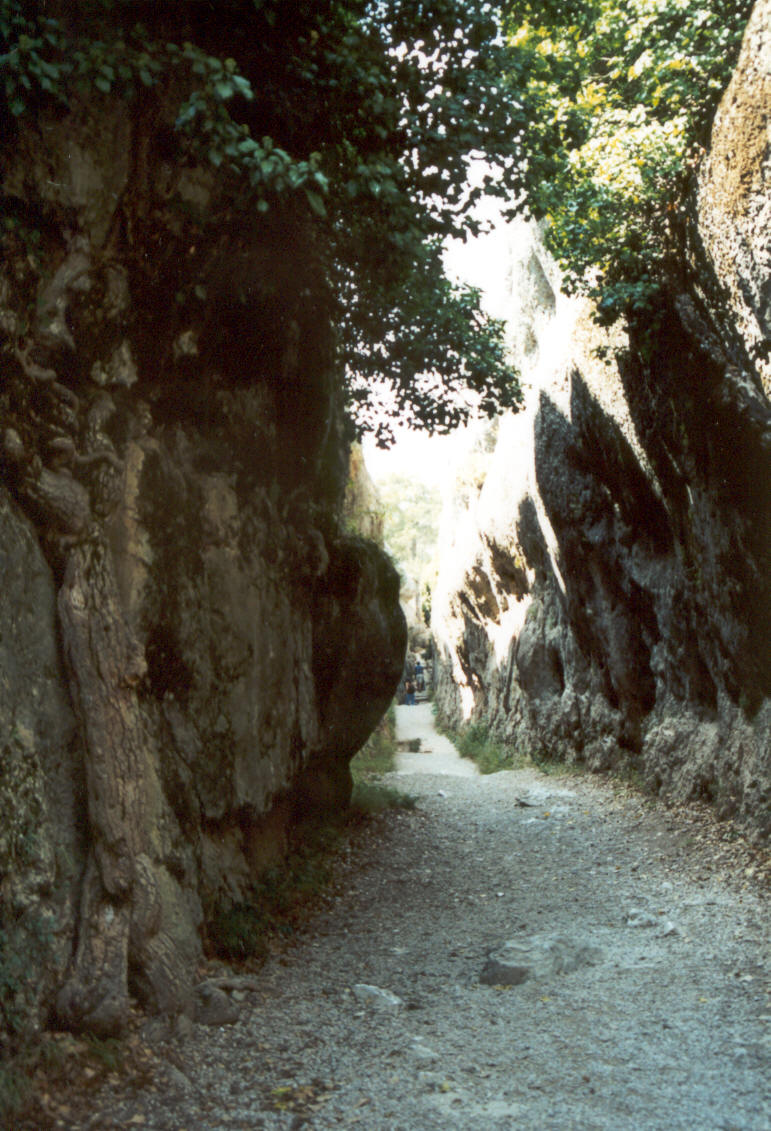
Wind gap opened by an ancient stream on a Karstic terrain in the Ciudad Encantada (Cuenca province) in Spain

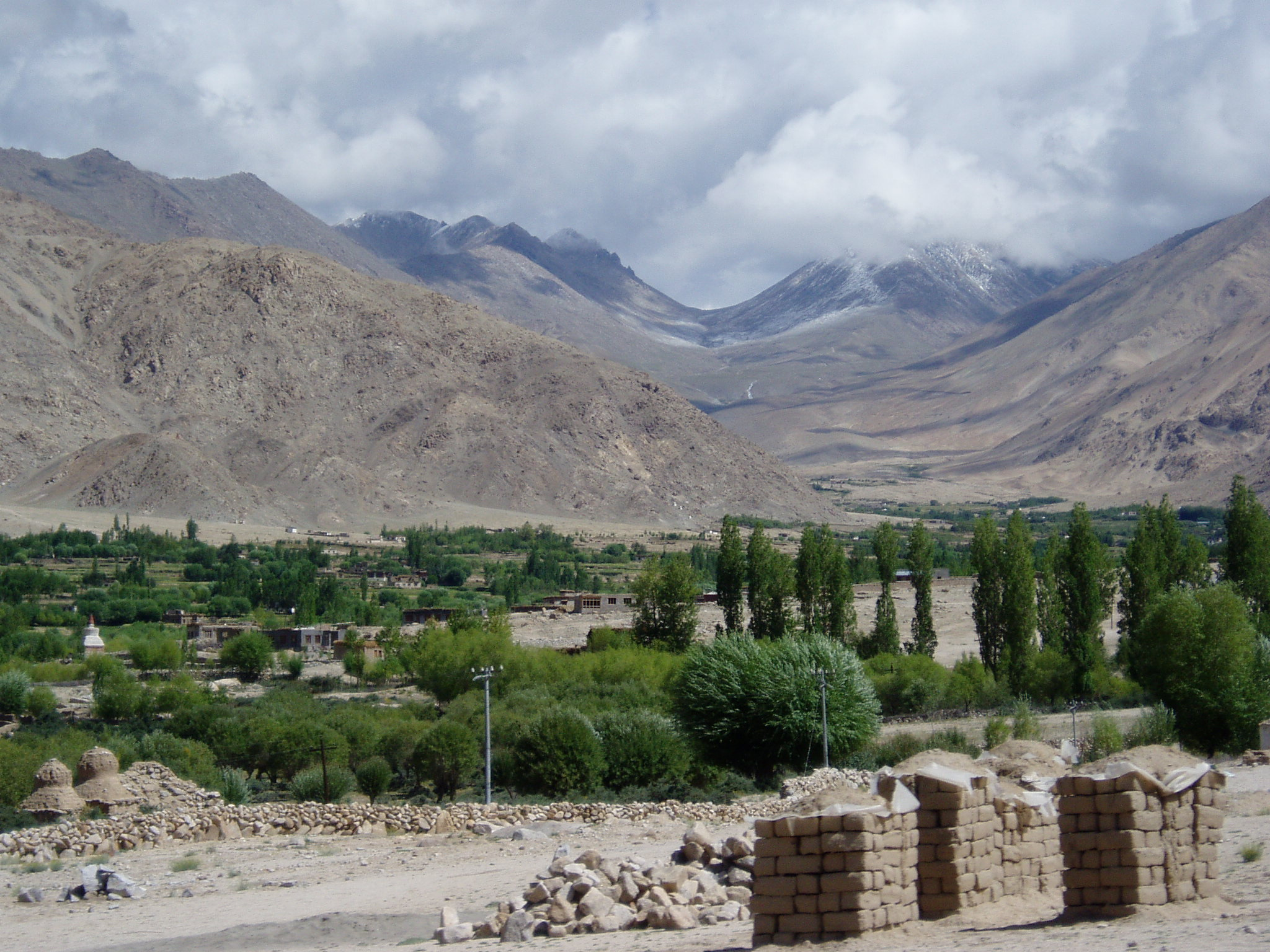
Glacially-carved wind gap in Karu Valley, Ladakh, NW Indian Himalaya
