= Thomas Methodist Episcopal Chapel =

Historic church in Virginia, US

- U.S. National Register of Historic Places
- Virginia Landmarks Register
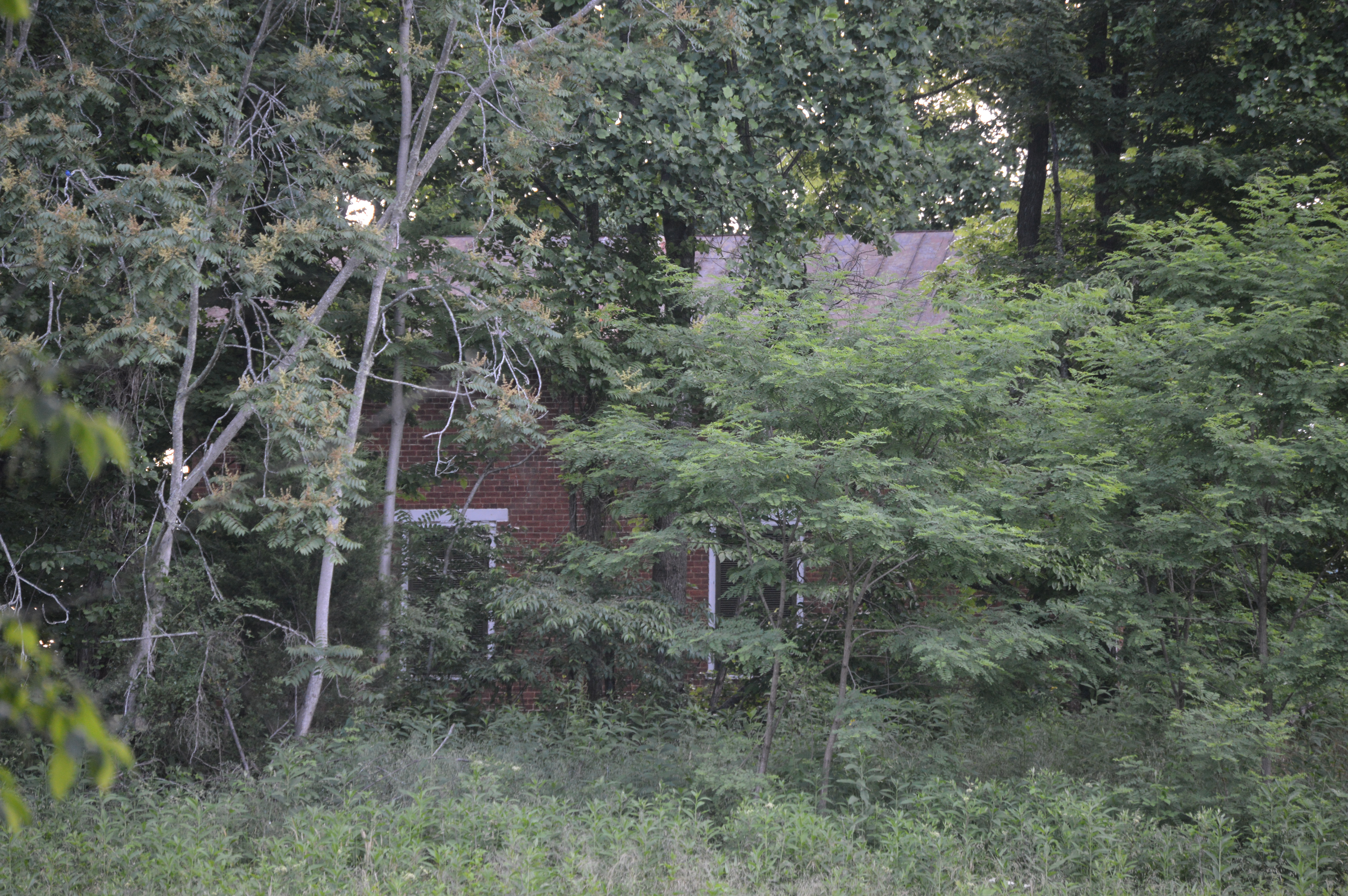
- Seen from the east

- Location within Virginia Location within the United States
- Location: Penicks Mill Rd. north of Thaxton, Virginia
- Coordinates: 37°22′50″N 79°37′38″W
- Area: 1.4 acres (0.57 ha)
- Built: 1844
- Architectural style: Greek Revival
- NRHP reference No.: 04000844
- VLR No.: 009-0178

Significant dates
- Added to NRHP: August 11, 2004
- Designated VLR: June 6, 2004

Thomas Methodist Episcopal Chapel, also known as Thomas Chapel and Thomas Chapel United Methodist Church, is a historic Methodist Episcopal church located at Thaxton, Bedford County, Virginia. It was built in 1844, and is a small, rectangular-plan, one-story, one-room, brick structure in a vernacular Greek Revival style. It measures 30 feet wide and 40 feet long, and has a three-bay facade and a pedimented front gable roof.

It was listed on the National Register of Historic Places in 2004.
