= Colonel Chaffin =

"Colonel" Josephus H. Chaffin (c. 1826 – April 1873) was an American with dwarfism who achieved some fame in the 1840s touring the United States. He was billed as the American Tom Thumb and "Virginia Dwarf".

Chaffin was from Bedford County, Virginia, and was reported to be 27 inches tall, and weighed 27 pounds.

According to the 1868 book Giants and Dwarfs, Chaffin (then age 42), "has all the appearances of manhood, and he converses with vivacity and intelligence. His face is worn, sunken, and wrinkled, and its lower part is covered with tangled red hair. His voice is of a childish treble, and particularly mournful. He is, however, cheerful and hopeful in disposition, and not in any way sensitive about his dwarfishness. Many years ago he was exhibited in all the cities of North and South America, and excited much interest and wonder; but since that period he has been living in obscurity in Bedford county." Chaffin did appear to make additional public appearances after this book was published.

Chaffin's two brothers and parents were reported to be normal or greater than normal size.

Chaffin died at his Virginia home in April 1873.
