= Staunton River High School =

Coordinates: 37°14′26″N 79°37′22″W

Location
- 1095 Gold Eagle Drive; Moneta, Virginia, Virginia 24121

Information
- School type: Public, High school
- Founded: October 3, 1963
- School district: Bedford County Public Schools
- Superintendent: William F. Dupere
- Principal: Darcy Parker
- Grades: 9–12
- Enrollment: 1343 (2023)
- Language: English
- Colors: Black and Gold
- Mascot: Golden eagle
- Nickname: Golden Eagles
- Feeder schools: Staunton River Middle School
- Rival schools: Liberty High School; Jefferson Forest High School; William Byrd High School
- Website: https://bedfordsrhs.sharpschool.net/

Staunton River High School is one of the three high schools in Bedford County, Virginia. SRHS opened in the fall of 1963.

== History ==
Staunton River High School opened October 3, 1963, after Bedford County Public Schools mandated the consolidation of multiple surrounding high schools: Stewartsville High School, Moneta High School, and Huddleston High Schools.

Ground was broken December 1, 1962. Roanoke District Superintendent, Dr. Herman L. Horn gave an initial speech at the event to 300 spectators on how the school's value would "be returned, five-fold, in five years".

== Characteristics ==
Staunton River High School is a campus-style school with four academic buildings, a gymnasium, an auditorium, a CTE building, a library, and a cafeteria. The landscaping is done by multiple local companies and emphasizes sharp-cornered sidewalk paths with large courtyards with spring-blossoming trees.

== Location ==
SRHS is located on Virginia State Route 24 in Moneta, Virginia. The school is approximately 19 miles east of Roanoke, Virginia, and approximately 12 miles southwest of Bedford, Virginia. SRHS is approximately 10 miles northwest of Smith Mountain Lake. Schools nearby include William Byrd High School, located 14 miles away in Vinton, Virginia, and Liberty High School, located 13 miles away in Bedford, Virginia. The school is located in the southwestern corner of Bedford County and is 11 miles from the headquarters for Bedford County Public Schools, which is located on S. Bridge Street in Bedford, Virginia. Metropolitan areas near the school include North Carolina state capital Raleigh, NC, which is located 144 miles from the school, Virginia state capital Richmond, VA which is located 148 miles from the school, and national capital Washington D.C., which is located 216 miles from the school. Zip codes that attend this school include 24121, 24095, and 24104.

== Academics ==
According to U.S. News & World Report, Staunton River High School ranks #9,902 in national high school rankings and #216 within Virginia. Students have the opportunity to participate in Advanced Placement Classes, with 17% of the students having participated in at least one. Staunton River students can also attend Roanoke Valley Governor's School for Science and Technology. A total of 9% of students are part of the dual enrollment program, provided by Central Virginia Community College.

Students in 11th or 12th grades may also participate in the National Honor Society, and if meeting the criteria, gain an Advanced Placement Capstone Diploma.

Staunton River trails the national average for four-year high school graduation by 2%, with an average of 90% of students graduating after four years, or with full high school course credits in three.

== Extracurriculars and sports ==
Staunton River High School offers a variety of clubs, sports, and extracurricular competitions.

Staunton River is part of the Virginia High School League (VHSL). A list of sports and coaches follows:

In February 2023, Staunton River High School obtained their first scholastic wrestling state title, in the Class 3 state championships. Five wrestlers won individual state titles: the most in school history. The first group-state title since 1996, when the Staunton River track team won the AA Division. In 2024, the school won their second consecutive state title.

In 2016, the Staunton River American football team placed as runner-ups after being defeated by the Blacksburg Bruins, 28–20.

In 2022, a student took home a state championship in the VHSL prose competition. It was the first VHSL forensic speaking and performance title, with the school also fielding a runner-up in the 2023 extemporaneous speaking category.

Staunton River High is a participant in the Smith Mountain Chapter of the Future Farmers of America (FFA).

== Faculty and staff ==
SRHS has two administrators and the teaching staff consists of 77 teachers, paraprofessionals, and alternate educational assistants. The principal of SRHS is Darcy Parker.

== Notable alumni ==
- Buddy Bolding: long-time coach of the Longwood Lancers baseball team.
