= Locust Level =

Historic house in Virginia, United States

- U.S. National Register of Historic Places
- Virginia Landmarks Register
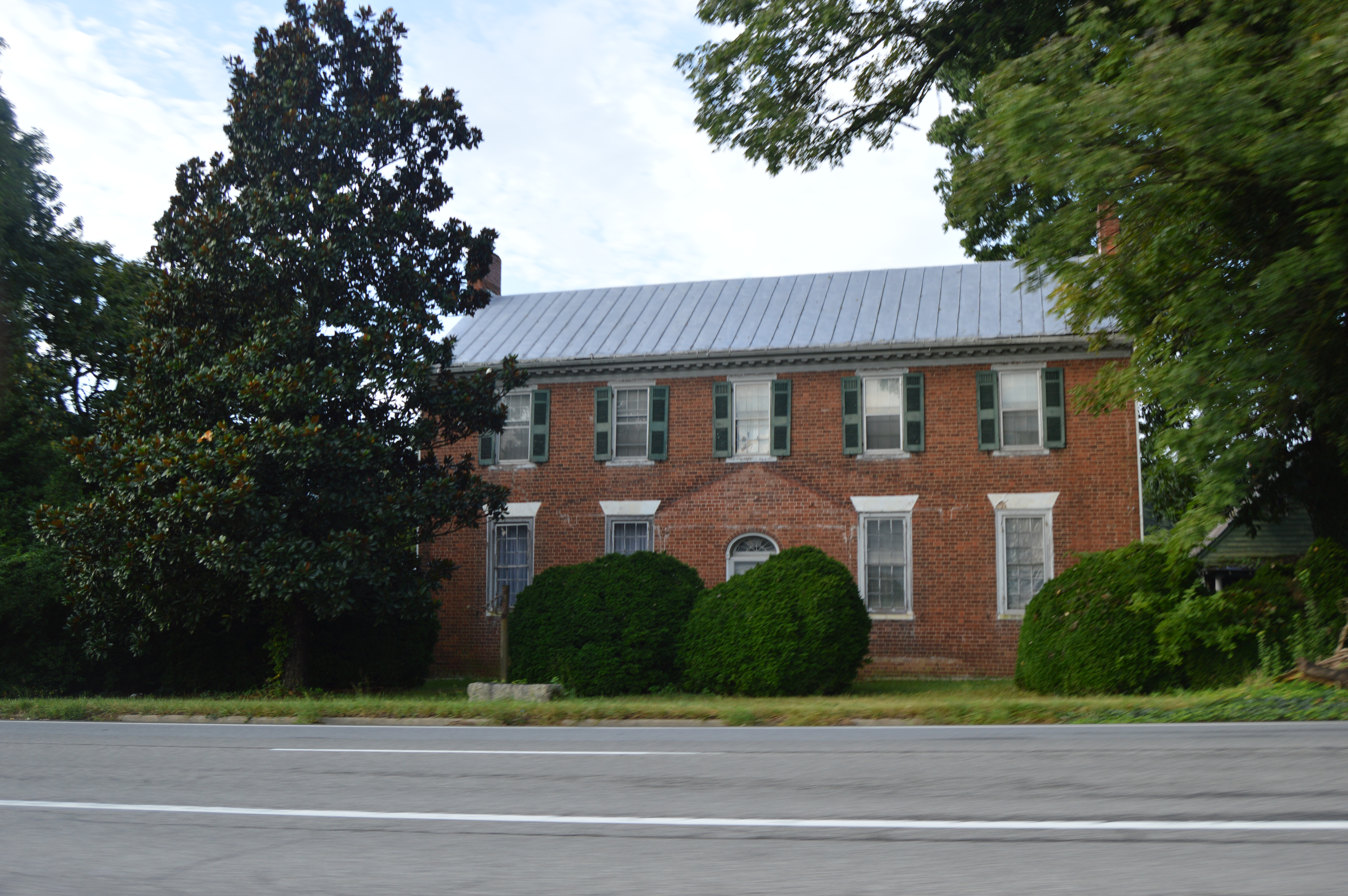
- Front of the house

- Location within Virginia Location within the United States
- Location: U.S. Route 460 west of its junction with VA 695, Montvale, Virginia
- Coordinates: 37°23′10.9″N 79°44′13.8″W
- Area: 8.1 acres (3.3 ha)
- Built: c. 1824
- Architectural style: Greek Revival, Federal
- NRHP reference No.: 90001841
- VLR No.: 009-0018

Significant dates
- Added to NRHP: December 21, 1990
- Designated VLR: August 21, 1990

Locust Level is a historic home and farm located at Montvale, Bedford County, Virginia. It was built about 1824, and is a two-story, brick, central-passage-plan I-house with fine exterior and interior Federal-style detailing. It has a standing seam metal roof. Attached to the rear is a two-story mortise-and-tenon frame wing known variously as the Hall or the Dance Hall. Also on the property are a contributing kitchen and dining room building, a free-standing chimney, a meat house, spring house, family cemetery, and three mounting blocks.

The home was built about 1822-1824 by Paschal and Frances Ann Otey Buford, on land that belonged to his father, Henry Buford. Frances Ann Matthews Otey Buford was part of the famous Mathews family. The land was originally granted by George III of the United Kingdom for "service to the crown." The home has ruins of the original home of Henry Buford on the site, as well as the remains of several of the mills operated by Paschal Buford. The famous treasure described in the Beale ciphers is thought to be buried near this home.

It was listed on the National Register of Historic Places in 1990.
