= National D-Day Memorial =

War memorial in Bedford, Virginia, United States

- Aerial view of the memorial complex
- Interactive map of National D-Day Memorial
- Location: Bedford, Virginia, U.S.
- Coordinates: 37°19′50″N 79°32′10″W
- Designer: Byron Dickson
- Type: War memorial
- Height: 44 feet 6 inches (13.56 m) (height of Overlord Arch)
- Visitors: 56,016 (in 2023–24)
- Dedicated date: June 6, 2001; 25 years ago
- Dedicated to: Allied Forces of D-Day
- Website: www.dday.org

The National D-Day Memorial is a war memorial located in Bedford, Virginia, United States. It serves as the national memorial for American D-Day veterans. Additionally, its scope is international in that it is "our nation’s memorial to the valor, fidelity, and sacrifice of the Allied Forces on D-Day, 6 June 1944" and commends all Allied armed forces during the D-Day invasion of Normandy, France, on June 6, 1944, during World War II.

The memorial borders the Blue Ridge Mountains in southwestern Virginia with an area of over 50 acres (20 ha) that overlooks the town of Bedford. It officially opened on June 6, 2001, with 15,000 people present, including President George W. Bush. About 60,000 people visit the memorial each year, with more than half from outside of Virginia.

== "Bedford Boys" and memorial location ==
Thirty-four Virginia National Guard soldiers participated in D-Day from Company A, 116th Infantry Regiment, 29th Infantry Division, based in the town of Bedford before the war. Company A was decimated within hours of landing, and 19 of the 34 men were killed during the first day of the invasion. Four more died during the rest of the Normandy campaign, two of them from other 116th companies. The town and the "Bedford Boys" proportionately suffered the greatest losses of any American town during the campaign, thus inspiring the United States Congress to situate the D-Day memorial in Bedford.

The Bedford Boys included three sets of brothers: twins Roy and Ray Stevens, with Ray killed during the landing while Roy survived; Clyde and Jack Powers, with Jack killed and Clyde wounded but surviving; and Bedford and Raymond Hoback, both killed. The losses by the soldiers from Bedford were chronicled in the best-selling book The Bedford Boys by Alex Kershaw, and helped inspire the movie Saving Private Ryan. Director Steven Spielberg helped fund the memorial, including funding for the creation of the Arnold M. Spielberg Theater in honor of his father, a World War II veteran.

== National D-Day Memorial Foundation ==
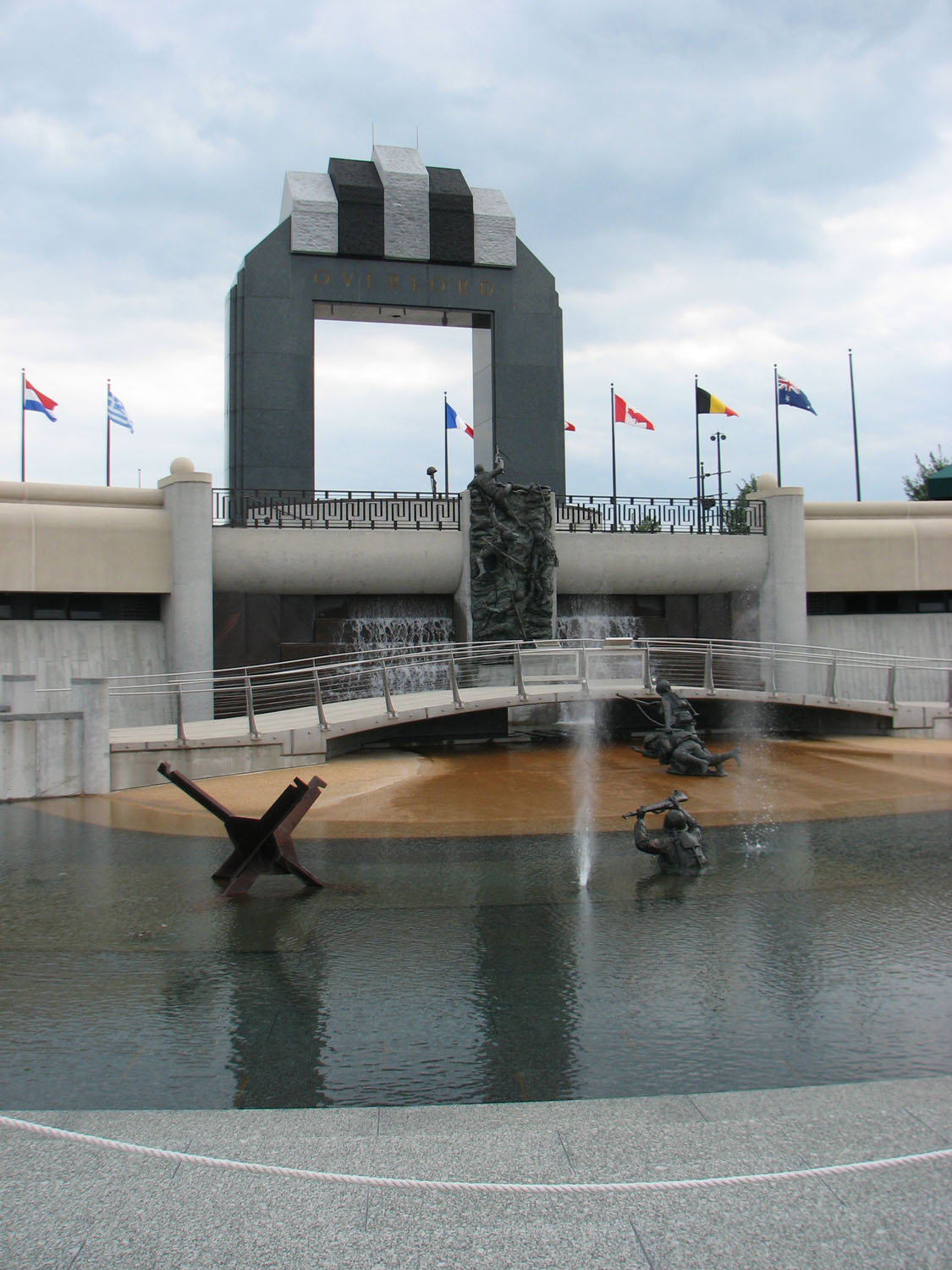
National D-Day Memorial pool with Overlord Arch

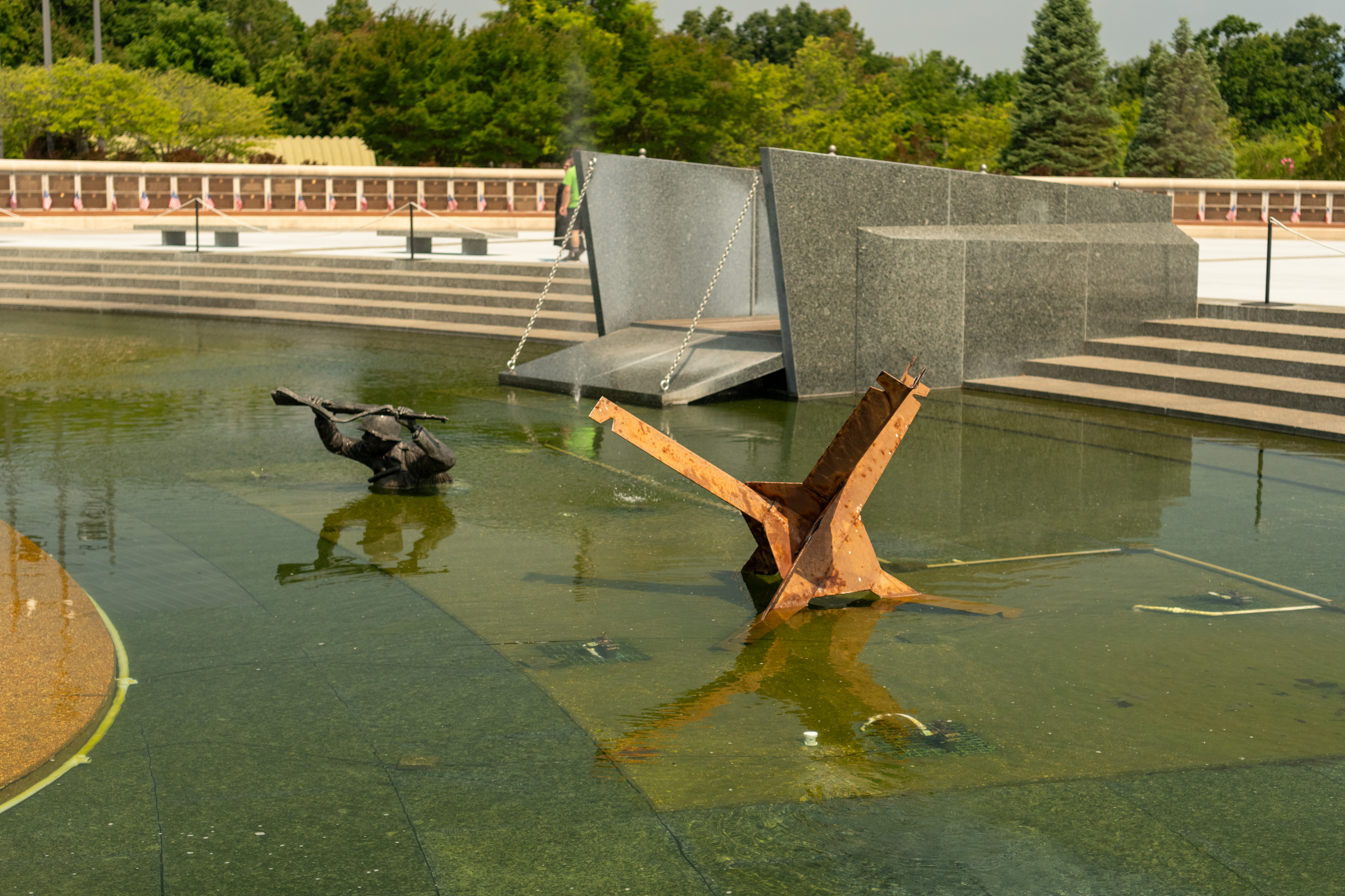
National D-Day Memorial pool with landing craft, American soldier, and German beach barrier

The National D-Day Memorial Foundation is a non-profit organization that had its beginnings as a small committee in 1988 with the prospect of building a memorial dedicated to the sacrifices made by the Allied Forces on D-Day. Support for its completion did not exist until 1994, the fiftieth anniversary of the invasion.

The foundation is headquartered in Bedford. April Cheek-Messier was named the president of The National D-Day Memorial Foundation in May 2013. The memorial lists the name of each of the 4,427 Allied soldiers who died in the invasion, the most complete list of its kind anywhere in the world. The memorial is currently working to compile a list of every service member who participated in Operations Overlord and Neptune. (Overlord was the code name of the actual invasion, whereas Neptune was code for getting the troops across the English Channel for the invasion.) The organization also involves itself in assisting veterans and their families, such as undertaking the search for family members of soldiers whose personal belongings have been found after years of being lost.

== Fundraising and construction ==
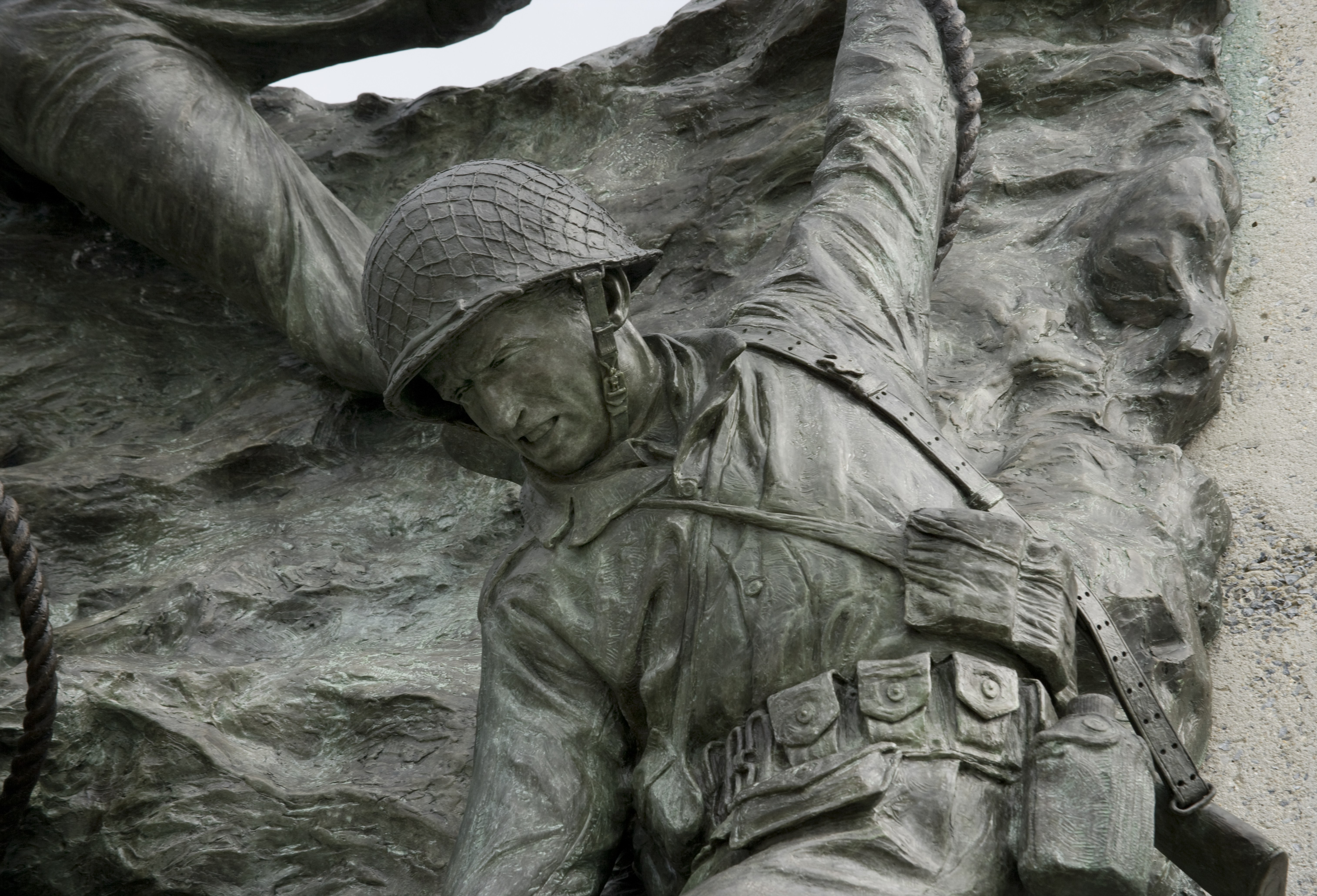
Detail from the memorial

Fundraising and building the memorial took approximately seven years of planning and approximately $25 million to complete. In 1994, the town of Bedford donated 11 acres (4.5 ha) of land to the memorial. The foundation purchased additional acreage, bringing the total size of the memorial to more than 50 acres (20 ha). In 1997, the foundation received a $1 million donation from Charles Schulz, who, with his wife, volunteered to head a fundraising campaign for the memorial.

According to the National D-Day Memorial Foundation, the memorial is a continuum of three distinct plazas which follow on a time line. The first plaza, Reynolds Garden, symbolizes the planning and preparation activities for the invasion through the execution of the order for the invasion. It is in the shape of the Supreme Headquarters Allied Expeditionary Force (SHAEF) combat patch. The second level, Gray Plaza, reflects the landing and fighting stages of the invasion. It includes what is called the invasion pool with beach obstacles in the water, sculptures of soldiers struggling ashore, and a representation of the Higgins craft used for the invasion. This section includes intermittent jets of water spurting from the pool replicating the sights and sounds of sporadic gunfire. The names of the United States' losses appear on the west necrology wall of the central plaza, the rest of the Allies' losses on the east necrology wall. In the spirit of Dwight D. Eisenhower's one-team command philosophy for the SHAEF, no other distinctions are made. The last and uppermost plaza, Estes Plaza, celebrates victory and includes the Overlord Arch and the twelve flags of those Allied nations that served in the Allied Expeditionary Force. The Overlord Arch represents the victory of Operation Overlord and bears the invasion date of June 6, 1944, in its height at 44 feet 6 inches (13.56 m) tall.

== Statuary ==
In 2010, the Memorial commissioned sculptor and local resident Richard Pumphrey to design a series of portrait busts honoring the leaders of the Allied Forces during WWII: U.S. Presidents Franklin D. Roosevelt and Harry S. Truman, British Prime Ministers Winston Churchill and Clement Attlee, Chairman of Free France Charles de Gaulle, President of the Republic of China Chiang Kai-shek, and General Secretary of the Soviet Union Joseph Stalin. The inclusion of the latter ignited controversy both locally and nationally, with many considering his recognition at the Memorial as an insult to the legacy and memory of World War II veterans. The public outcry soon prompted the removal of Stalin's bust, and eventually the busts of De Gaulle and Chiang were removed as well, with the intention of emphasizing the Memorial's focus on the leaders and veterans of D-Day itself.

While the American and British leaders are still honored with busts at the Memorial, the most honor is given to Dwight D. Eisenhower, the Supreme Commander of the Allied Expeditionary Force and spearhead of Operation Overlord. He is honored with a larger-than-life statue and is surrounded by portrait busts of the various military leaders under his command: Deputy Supreme Commander Arthur Tedder, Chief of Staff Walter Bedell Smith, Naval Commander Bertram Ramsay, Air Force Commander Trafford Leigh-Mallory, and Ground Force Commanders Bernard Montgomery and Omar Bradley.

Also included at the Memorial is a portrait bust of John Robert Slaughter, a D-Day veteran who landed at Omaha Beach and founder of what would eventually become the National D-Day Memorial Foundation in 1989.

== Tourism ==
The memorial is open every day from 10:00 AM to 5:00 PM. The invasion pool is drained for maintenance during January, February, and part of March. The memorial also hosts events relating to remembering World War II on certain weekends, including Memorial Day, Veterans Day, and D-Day activities that occur annually.

A 2014 report by the National Park Service (NPS) reached a finding that the memorial "does not possess a strong enough association with the events of the Normandy invasion to be considered nationally significant under the National Historic Landmark (NHL) criteria for its association with a nationally historic event" based on the location of the memorial being nearly 4,000 miles (6,400 km) from the event and not having existed at the time of the event. The NPS also noted that "the Foundation is adequately protecting the Memorial’s resources and providing for educational experiences and public enjoyment."

== See also ==
=== United States ===
- List of national memorials of the United States

Listed alphabetically by state

- The National WWII Museum in New Orleans, Louisiana
- American Heritage Museum in Stow, Massachusetts
- The International Museum of World War II in Natick, Massachusetts (defunct)
- National World War I Museum and Memorial in Kansas City, Missouri
- National Museum of the Pacific War in Fredericksburg, Texas
- Marine Corps War Memorial in Arlington County, Virginia
- World War II Memorial in the National Mall, Washington, D.C.
- United States Holocaust Memorial Museum in National Mall, Washington, D.C.

=== Elsewhere ===
Listed alphabetically by country

- Belarusian Great Patriotic War Museum in Minsk, Belarus
- Museum of the War of Chinese People's Resistance Against Japanese Aggression in Beijing, China
- Imperial War Museum in London, England
- Museum of La Coupole in Pas-de-Calais, France
- Museum of the Second World War in Gdańsk, Poland
- Museum of the Great Patriotic War, Moscow in Russia
- National Museum of the History of Ukraine in the Second World War in Kyiv, Ukraine

== Sources ==
- Dickson, Byron (2011). The National D-Day Memorial: Evolution of an Idea. Bedford, Virginia: Bison Printing. ISBN 978-0-615-44142-9.
- Kershaw, Alex (2003). The Bedford Boys. Cambridge, Massachusetts: Da Capo Press. ISBN 978-0306811678.
