= Montvale, Virginia =

Montvale
- Census-designated place
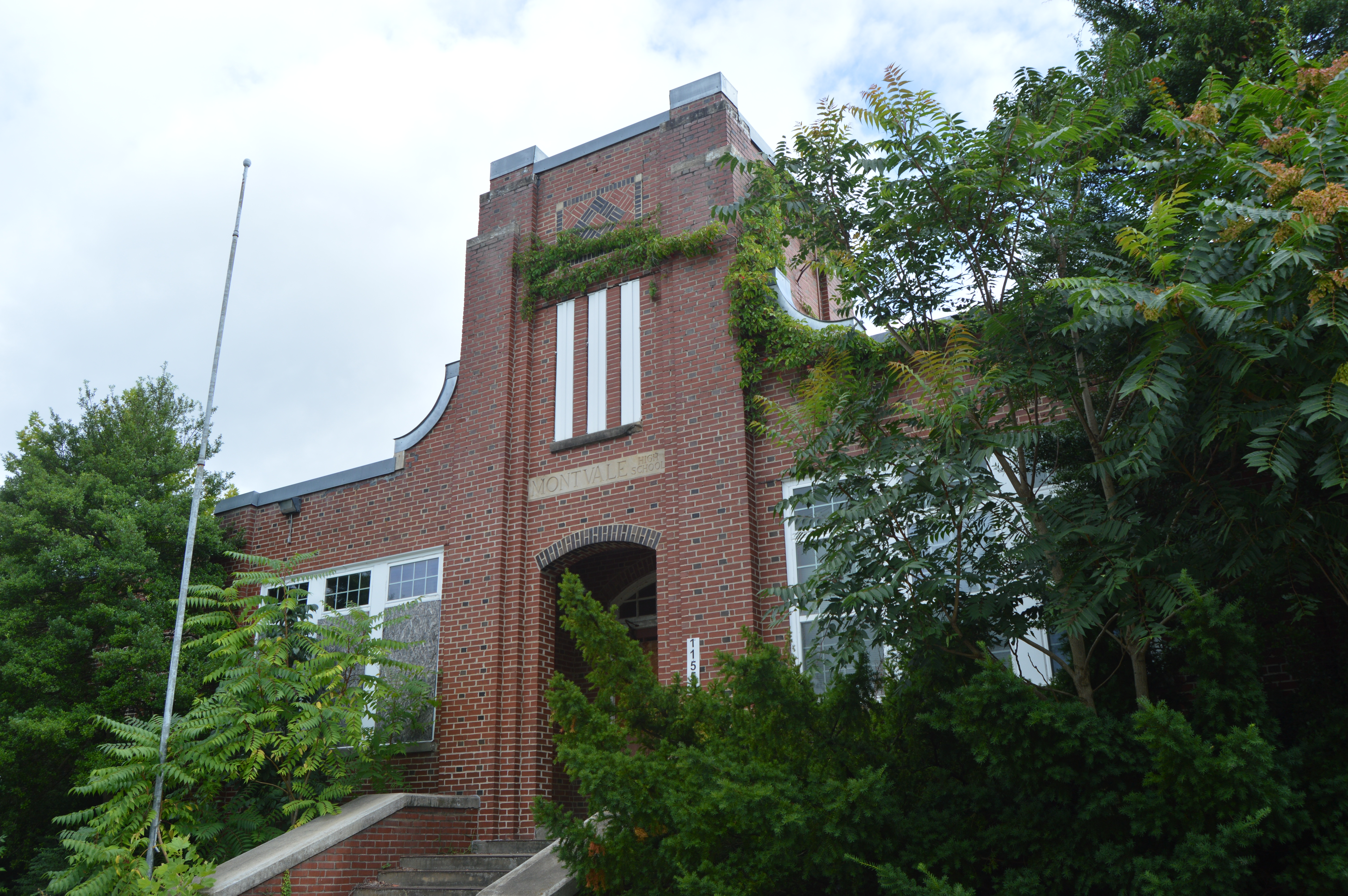
- The former Montvale High School on U.S. Route 460

- Location within the Commonwealth of Virginia
- Coordinates: 37°23′18″N 79°43′42″W
- Country: United States
- State: Virginia
- County: Bedford

Area
  - Total: 2.416 sq mi (6.26 km^{2})
  - Land: 2.414 sq mi (6.25 km^{2})
  - Water: 0.002 sq mi (0.0052 km^{2})

Population (2020)
  - Total: 635
  - Density: 263/sq mi (102/km^{2})
- Time zone: UTC−5 (Eastern (EST))
  - Summer (DST): UTC−4 (EDT)
- ZIP Codes: 24064 (Blue Ridge); 24122 (Montvale)
- Area codes: 540 and 826
- FIPS code: 51-52968
- GNIS feature ID: 2629032

Montvale is a census-designated place (CDP) in western Bedford County, Virginia, United States. The population as of the 2020 census was 635. The community is located between Roanoke and Bedford. It is part of the Lynchburg Metropolitan Statistical Area.

== History ==
Locust Level was listed on the National Register of Historic Places in 1990.

== Geography ==
According to the United States Census Bureau, the CDP has a total area of 2.416 square miles (6.257 km²).

== Demographics ==
Historical population
| Census | Pop. | Note | %± |
|---|---|---|---|
| 2010 | 698 | | — |
| 2020 | 635 | | −9.0% |
U.S. Decennial Census; 2010 2020

Montvale as first listed as a census designated place in the 2010 U.S. census.

=== 2020 census ===
As of the census of 2020, there were 635 people residing in the CDP. There were 313 housing units. The racial makeup of the CDP was 93.4% White, 4.7% African American or Black, 0.3% American Indian, 0.6% Asian, 0.0% Pacific Islander, 0.0% from other races, and 1.0% from two or more races. Hispanic or Latino of any race were 1.0% of the population.

== Economy ==
=== Oil terminal ===
The community was home to an oil terminal that served the Colonial Pipeline for nearly 60 years before being shut down in 2018. Colonial made the decision to close the pipeline spur to Montvale due to repair costs. The shutdown eliminated 20 jobs in the community. In 2020, Colonial indicated there were no plans to reopen the pipeline in Montvale.

=== Montvale Center for Commerce ===
The Montvale Center for Commerce consists of two business parks located along U.S. Route 460. The commercial center is a 19-acre site that is commercially zoned and fronts U.S. Route 460. Across from the commercially zoned property is a 45-acre park designed for non-commercial business and industry.

== Parks and recreation ==
Montvale Park, a 129-acre public park maintained by the Bedford County Parks and Recreation Department, is located in the CDP. The park features three soccer fields, a picnic shelter, and walking trails.

== Government ==
The United States Postal Service operates the Montvale Post Office within the CDP, although portions of the area have a Blue Ridge ZIP Code.

== Education ==
The CDP is served by Bedford County Public Schools. Public school students residing in Montvale are zoned to attend Montvale Elementary School, Liberty Middle School, and Liberty High School.

A branch campus of Central Virginia Community College in nearby Bedford is the closest higher education institution to the CDP.

== Infrastructure ==
The Bedford Regional Water Authority operates a public water and wastewater system within the CDP.

=== Public safety ===
Law enforcement is provided by the Bedford County Sheriff's Office. Fire protection is provided by the Montvale Volunteer Fire Department, which operates a fire station within the CDP. Emergency medical services are provided by the Montvale Volunteer Rescue Squad, which also operates from a station within the CDP.

== Transportation ==
=== Air ===
The Roanoke-Blacksburg Regional Airport is the closest airport with commercial service to the CDP.

=== Highways ===
- US Route 221 (West Lynchburg Salem Turnpike)
- US Route 460 (West Lynchburg Salem Turnpike)

=== Rail ===
The Norfolk Southern operated Blue Ridge District runs through the CDP. The closest passenger rail service is located in Roanoke.
