= Goodview, Virginia =

Unincorporated community in Virginia, United States

- Unincorporated community
- Location within Virginia Location within the United States
- Coordinates: 37°12′52″N 79°43′30″W
- Country: United States
- State: Virginia
- County: Bedford
- Elevation: 997 ft (304 m)
- Time zone: UTC-5 (Eastern (EST))
  - Summer (DST): UTC-4 (EDT)
- ZIP code: 24095
- Area code: 540
- GNIS feature ID: 1477363

Goodview is an unincorporated community in Bedford County, Virginia, United States. Goodview is 13.9 miles (22.4 km) southwest of Bedford. Goodview has a post office with ZIP code 24095.
