= Bedford County Public Schools =

School district in Bedford County, Virginia, United States

Location
- Bedford, Virginia United States

Other information
- Website: http://www.bedford.k12.va.us/

Bedford County Public Schools is a school district based in Bedford, Virginia, United States. It serves Bedford County, Virginia, United States.

== History ==
In 1959 Bedford town began to contract to the county school system.

In 1984 there were plans for Bedford city to re-establish a separate school system.

== Schools ==
=== Elementary schools ===
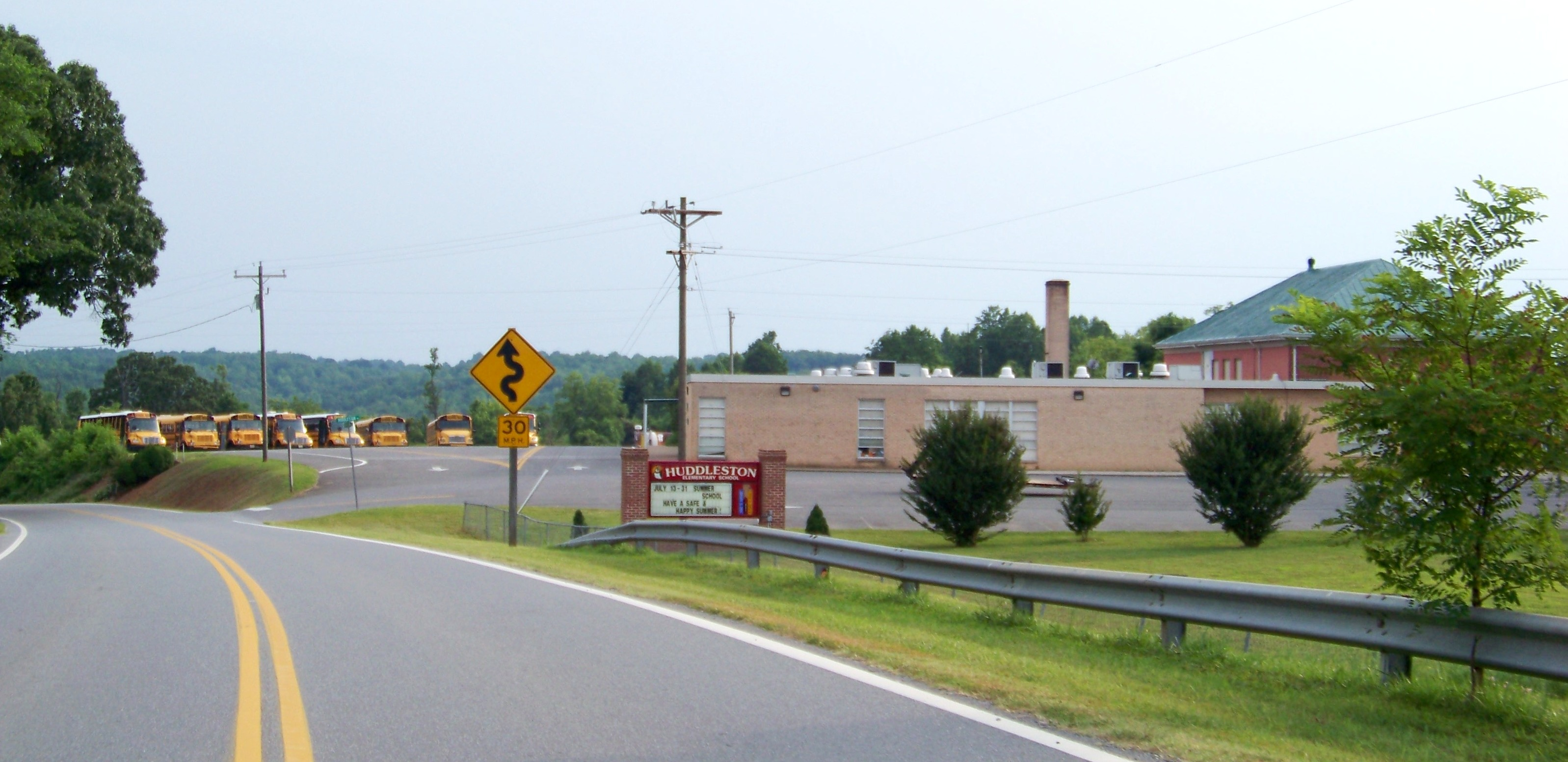
Huddleston Elementary School

- Bedford Elementary School
- Bedford Primary School
- Big Island Elementary School
- Body Camp Elementary School (Closed)
- Boonsboro Elementary School
- Forest Elementary School
- Goodview Elementary School
- Huddleston Elementary School
- Moneta Elementary School
- Montvale Elementary School
- New London Academy
- Otter River Elementary School
- Stewartsville Elementary School
- Thaxton Elementary School (Closed)
- Thomas Jefferson Elementary School

=== Middle schools ===
- Bedford Middle School (closed)
- Forest Middle School
- Liberty Middle School
- Staunton River Middle School

=== High schools ===
- Bedford Science and Technology Center
- Jefferson Forest High School
- Liberty High School
- Staunton River High School

== Foundation ==
The Bedford Area Educational Foundation raises funds and provides grants to improve education in Bedford and Bedford County.
