= Bedford County, Virginia =

County in Virginia, United States

- County
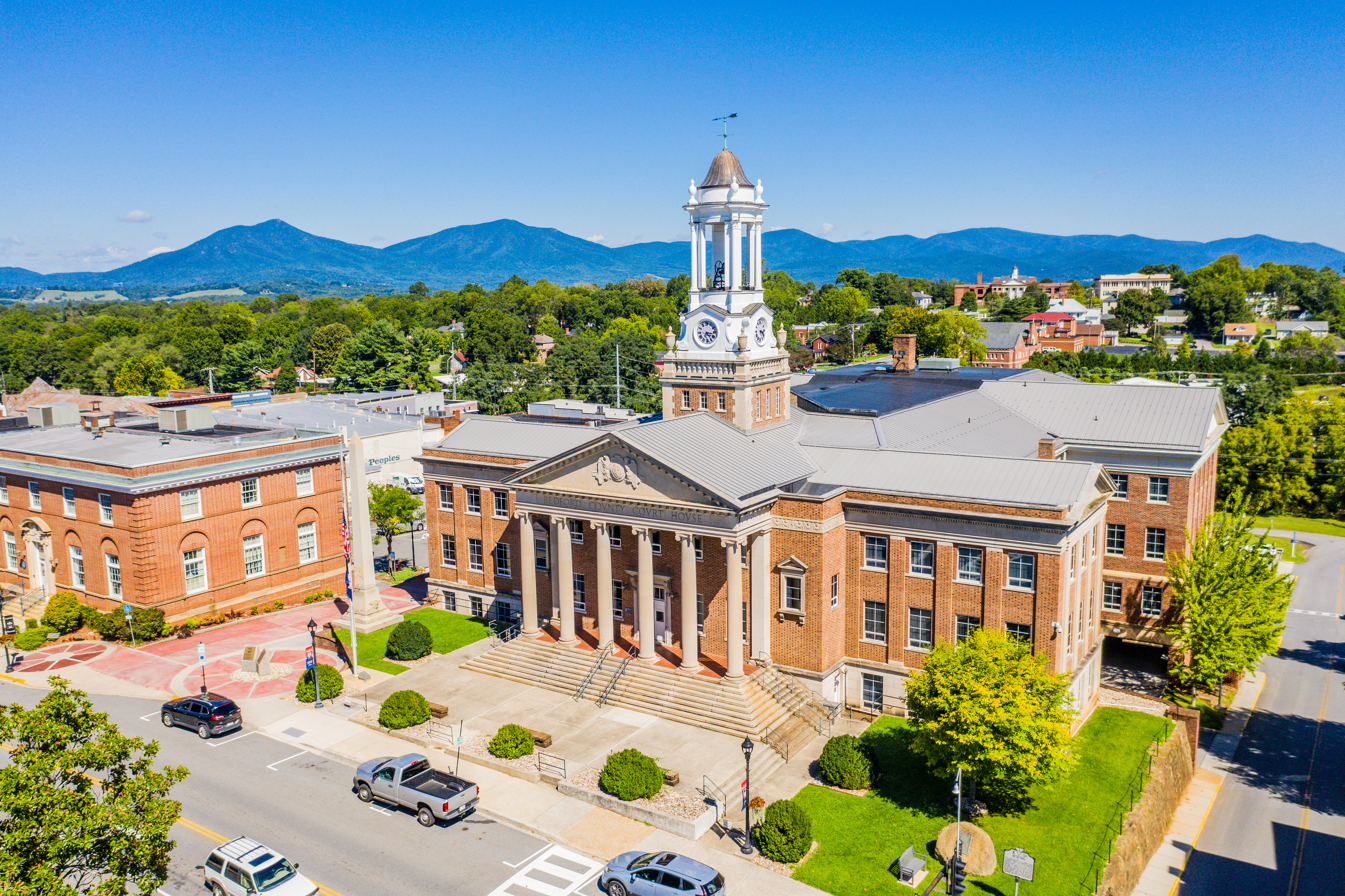
- Bedford County Courthouse

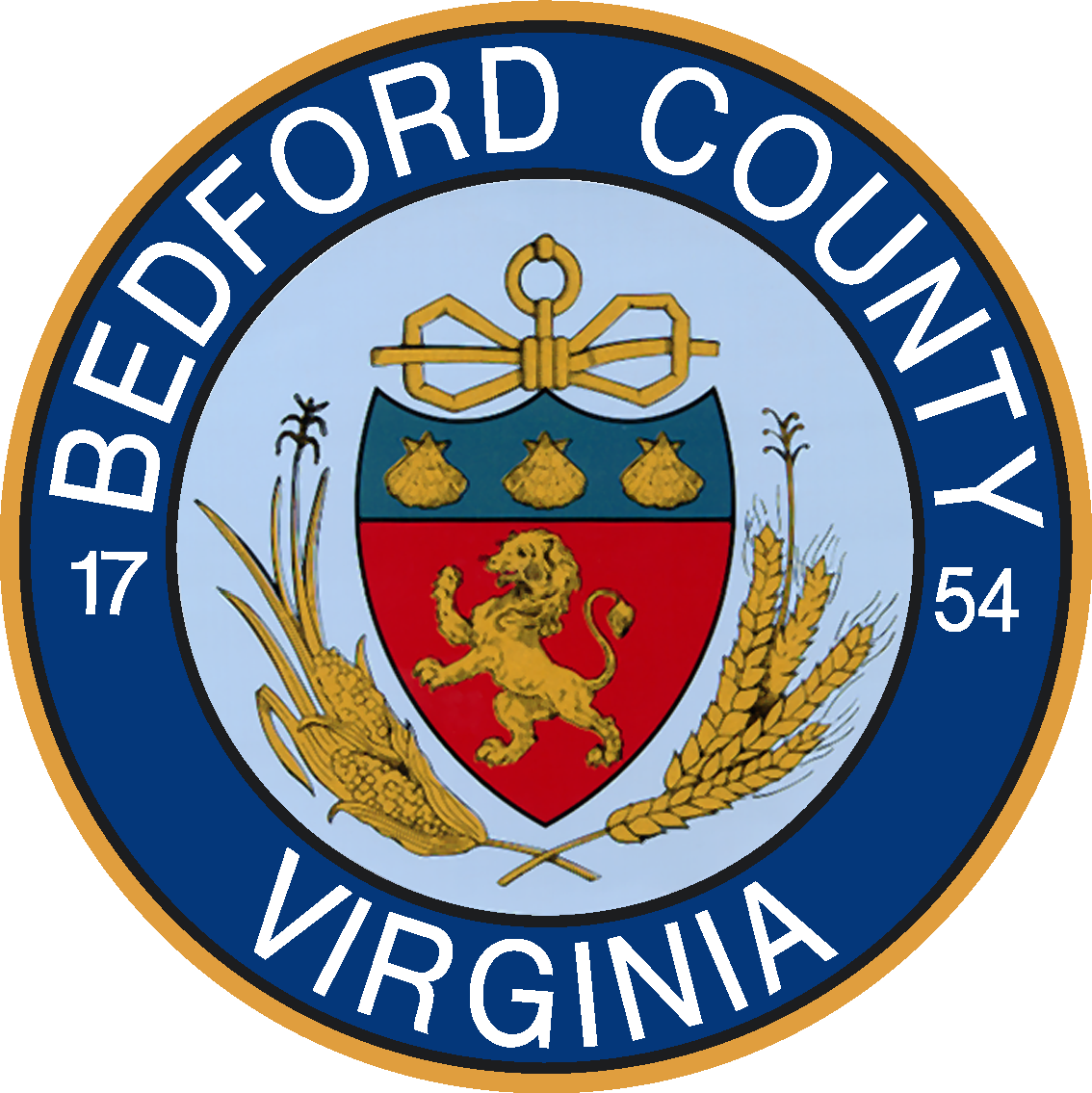
- Flag Seal

- Location within the U.S. state of Virginia
- Coordinates: 37°19′N 79°32′W
- Country: United States
- State: Virginia
- Founded: 1754
- Named for: John Russell, 4th Duke of Bedford
- Seat: Bedford
- Largest town: Bedford

Area
  - Total: 769 sq mi (1,990 km^{2})
  - Land: 753 sq mi (1,950 km^{2})
  - Water: 16 sq mi (41 km^{2}) 2.1%

Population (2020)
  - Total: 79,462
  - Estimate (2025): 83,059 ▲
  - Density: 106/sq mi (40.7/km^{2})
- Time zone: UTC−5 (Eastern)
  - Summer (DST): UTC−4 (EDT)
- Congressional districts: 5th, 9th
- Website: www.bedfordcountyva.gov

Bedford County is a United States county located in the Piedmont region of the Commonwealth of Virginia. Its county seat is the town of Bedford, which was an independent city from 1968 until rejoining the county in 2013.

Bedford County was created in 1753 from parts of Lunenburg County, and several changes in alignment were made until the present borders were established in 1786. The county was named in honor of John Russell, an English statesman and fourth Duke of Bedford.

Bedford County is part of the Lynchburg metropolitan area. As of the 2020 census, Bedford's population was 79,462. The county population has more than doubled since 1980.

== History ==
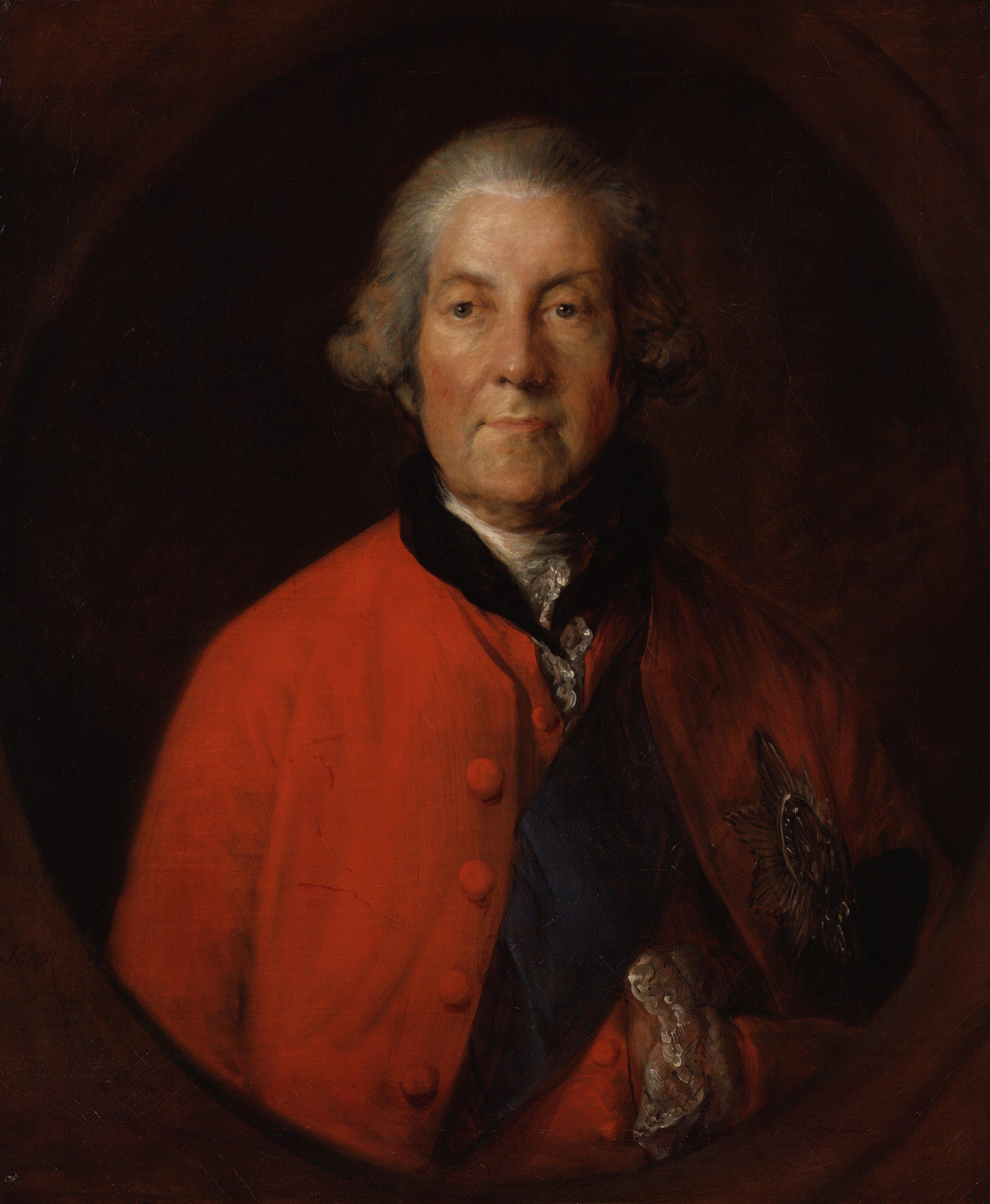
John Russell, 4th Duke of Bedford, the county's namesake

The Piedmont area had long been inhabited by indigenous peoples. At the time of European encounter, mostly Siouan-speaking tribes lived in this area.

Bedford County was established by the Virginia General Assembly on December 13, 1753, from parts of Lunenburg County. Later in 1756, a portion of Albemarle County lying south of the James River was added. The county is named for John Russell, the fourth Duke of Bedford, who was a Secretary of State of Great Britain. In 1782, Campbell County was formed from eastern Bedford County and the county seat was moved from New London to Liberty (now Bedford). Also in 1786, the portion of Bedford County south of the Staunton (Roanoke) River was taken with part of Henry County to form Franklin County.

The town of Bedford became an independent city in 1968, and remained the county seat. On September 14, 2011, the Bedford City Council voted to transition into a town and end its independent city status. The supervisors of Bedford County also voted to accept the town of Bedford as part of the county when it lost city status. The town of Bedford once more became part of Bedford County on July 1, 2013.

== Geography ==
According to the U.S. Census Bureau, the county has a total area of 769 square miles (1,990 km^{2}), of which 753 square miles (1,950 km^{2}) is land and 16 square miles (41 km^{2}) (2.1%) is water.

=== Adjacent counties and city ===
- Rockbridge County – north
- Amherst County – northeast
- Lynchburg – east (independent city)
- Campbell County – southeast
- Pittsylvania County – south
- Franklin County – southwest
- Roanoke County – west
- Botetourt County – northwest

=== National protected areas ===
- Blue Ridge Parkway (part)
- Jefferson National Forest (part). The Jefferson National Forest has roads and trails for hiking, horseback riding, mountain biking, dog-walking, scenic drives, wildlife viewing, camping, and photography as well as streams for paddling and fishing. Roads and trails are shown on National Geographic Map 789, "Lexington, Blue Ridge Mts Map, George Washington and Jefferson National Forests". The nearby Glenwood Cluster contains areas in the Jefferson Forest designated by the Wilderness Society as "Mountain Treasures".
- James River Face Wilderness (part)
- Thunder Ridge Wilderness (part)

=== State Park ===
- Smith Mountain Lake State Park

=== Major highways ===
- US 221
- US 460
- US 501
- SR 24
- SR 43
- SR 122
- Blue Ridge Parkway

== Demographics ==
Historical population
Census	Pop.	Note	%±
1790	10,531		—
1800	14,125		34.1%
1810	16,148		14.3%
1820	19,305		19.6%
1830	20,246		4.9%
1840	20,203		−0.2%
1850	24,080		19.2%
1860	25,068		4.1%
1870	25,327		1.0%
1880	31,205		23.2%
1890	31,213		0.0%
1900	30,356		−2.7%
1910	29,549		−2.7%
1920	30,669		3.8%
1930	29,091		−5.1%
1940	29,687		2.0%
1950	29,627		−0.2%
1960	31,028		4.7%
1970	26,728		−13.9%
1980	34,927		30.7%
1990	45,656		30.7%
2000	60,371		32.2%
2010	68,676		13.8%
2020	79,462		15.7%
2025 (est.)	83,059	▲	4.5%
U.S. Decennial Census; 1790-1960 1900-1990; 1990-2000 2010 2020

=== Racial and ethnic composition ===
Bedford County, Virginia – Racial and ethnic composition Note: the US Census treats Hispanic/Latino as an ethnic category. This table excludes Latinos from the racial categories and assigns them to a separate category. Hispanics/Latinos may be of any race.
Race / Ethnicity (NH = Non-Hispanic)	Pop 1980	Pop 1990	Pop 2000	Pop 2010	Pop 2020	% 1980	% 1990	% 2000	% 2010	% 2020
White alone (NH)	30,708	41,721	55,358	62,035	68,128	87.92%	91.38%	91.70%	90.33%	85.74%
Black or African American alone (NH)	3,923	3,584	3,752	3,909	4,864	11.23%	7.85%	6.21%	5.69%	6.12%
Native American or Alaska Native alone (NH)	10	59	113	172	167	0.03%	0.13%	0.19%	0.25%	0.21%
Asian alone (NH)	57	114	258	700	967	0.16%	0.25%	0.43%	1.02%	1.22%
Native Hawaiian or Pacific Islander alone (NH)	x	x	7	14	33	x	x	0.01%	0.02%	0.04%
Other race alone (NH)	9	1	28	47	329	0.03%	0.00%	0.05%	0.07%	0.41%
Mixed race or Multiracial (NH)	x	x	406	709	2,919	x	x	0.67%	1.03%	3.67%
Hispanic or Latino (any race)	220	177	449	1,090	2,055	0.63%	0.39%	0.74%	1.59%	2.59%
Total	34,927	45,656	60,371	68,676	79,462	100.00%	100.00%	100.00%	100.00%	100.00%

=== 2020 census ===
As of the 2020 census, the county had a population of 79,462. The median age was 47.3 years. 20.0% of residents were under the age of 18 and 22.5% of residents were 65 years of age or older. For every 100 females there were 96.0 males, and for every 100 females age 18 and over there were 94.3 males age 18 and over.

The racial makeup of the county was 86.5% White, 6.2% Black or African American, 0.3% American Indian and Alaska Native, 1.2% Asian, 0.0% Native Hawaiian and Pacific Islander, 1.0% from some other race, and 4.8% from two or more races. Hispanic or Latino residents of any race comprised 2.6% of the population.

29.3% of residents lived in urban areas, while 70.7% lived in rural areas.

There were 32,486 households in the county, of which 26.1% had children under the age of 18 living with them and 22.3% had a female householder with no spouse or partner present. About 25.2% of all households were made up of individuals and 12.1% had someone living alone who was 65 years of age or older.

There were 37,249 housing units, of which 12.8% were vacant. Among occupied housing units, 80.8% were owner-occupied and 19.2% were renter-occupied. The homeowner vacancy rate was 1.4% and the rental vacancy rate was 9.5%.

=== 2000 Census ===
As of the census of 2000, there were 60,371 people, 23,838 households, and 18,164 families residing in the county. The population density was 80 people per square mile (31 people/km^{2}). There were 26,841 housing units at an average density of 36 units per square mile (14 units/km^{2}). The racial makeup of the county was 92.18% White, 6.24% Black or African American, 0.20% Native American, 0.43% Asian, 0.01% Pacific Islander, 0.20% from other races, and 0.74% from two or more races. 0.74% of the population were Hispanic or Latino of any race. 28.2% were of American, 15.6% English, 11.0% German and 9.6% Irish ancestry according to Census 2000.

There were 23,838 households, out of which 32.50% had children under the age of 18 living with them, 65.40% were married couples living together, 7.50% had a female householder with no husband present, and 23.80% were non-families. 20.20% of all households were made up of individuals, and 7.30% had someone living alone who was 65 years of age or older. The average household size was 2.52 and the average family size was 2.89.

In the county, the population's age distribution was: 24.00% under the age of 18, 5.80% from 18 to 24, 29.90% from 25 to 44, 27.50% from 45 to 64, and 12.80% who were 65 years of age or older. The median age was 40 years. For every 100 females there were 99.50 males. For every 100 females age 18 and over, there were 97.50 males.

The median income for a household in the county was $43,136, and the median income for a family was $49,303. Males had a median income of $35,117 versus $23,906 for females. The per capita income for the county was $21,582. About 5.20% of families and 7.10% of the population were below the poverty line, including 8.30% of those under age 18 and 10.50% of those age 65 or over.

=== 2017 ===
As of 2017, the largest self-reported ancestry groups were:

- English - 16.5%
- American - 14.3%
- German - 13.3%
- Irish - 11.3%
- Italian - 3.0%
- Scots-Irish - 2.7%
- Scottish - 2.6%

== Government ==
=== Board of Supervisors ===
- District 1: Mickey M. Johnson (R)
- District 2: Edgar Tuck, (I)
- District 3: Charla Bansley (R)
- District 4: John Sharp, (R)
- District 5: Tommy W. Scott, (Vice-Chair) (R)
- District 6: Bob W. Davis (R)
- District 7: Tamara F. "Tammy" Parker, (Chair) (R)

=== Constitutional officers ===
- Clerk of the Circuit Court: Judy Reynolds (R)
- Commissioner of the Revenue: Tracy Patterson (R)
- Commonwealth's Attorney: Christopher Dolen (acting)
- Sheriff: Michael Miller (R)
- Treasurer: Will Perrow (R)

Bedford County is represented by Republican Mark Peake (8th District) in the Virginia Senate; Republicans Eric Zehr (51st District) and Tim Griffin (53rd District) in the Virginia House of Delegates; and Republicans John McGuire (VA 5th District) and Morgan Griffith (VA 9th District) in the U.S. House of Representatives.

== Economy ==
Historically, Bedford County was an agricultural economy. While agriculture is still an important factor in the county's economy, Bedford County has significant residential development to serve Lynchburg, Roanoke, and Smith Mountain Lake. Tourism and retail are also becoming more significant, with some new industry near Forest and New London.

== Politics ==
Bedford has voted Republican in every presidential election since 1980. Like much of the Solid South, it was a reliably Democratic county until 1948, when Strom Thurmond's candidacy reduced Harry S. Truman's victory, and it was a swing county for the next three decades. It voted for segregationist third-party candidate George Wallace for president in 1968.

United States presidential election results for Bedford County, Virginia
Year	Republican		Democratic		Third party(ies)	
Year	No.	%	No.	%	No.	%
1912	142	8.19%	1,219	70.34%	372	21.47%
1916	298	15.38%	1,628	84.05%	11	0.57%
1920	583	24.49%	1,774	74.51%	24	1.01%
1924	432	19.00%	1,811	79.64%	31	1.36%
1928	1,118	43.77%	1,436	56.23%	0	0.00%
1932	469	16.57%	2,321	81.99%	41	1.45%
1936	619	21.30%	2,276	78.32%	11	0.38%
1940	791	23.68%	2,535	75.90%	14	0.42%
1944	1,068	29.60%	2,534	70.23%	6	0.17%
1948	1,084	30.04%	1,556	43.11%	969	26.85%
1952	2,916	54.47%	2,426	45.32%	11	0.21%
1956	3,148	52.07%	2,649	43.81%	249	4.12%
1960	2,911	47.87%	3,150	51.80%	20	0.33%
1964	3,806	48.09%	4,076	51.50%	32	0.40%
1968	2,807	35.80%	1,574	20.08%	3,459	44.12%
1972	5,286	73.43%	1,501	20.85%	412	5.72%
1976	4,189	45.31%	4,766	51.55%	291	3.15%
1980	6,608	55.81%	4,721	39.87%	511	4.32%
1984	10,371	68.15%	4,754	31.24%	92	0.60%
1988	10,702	65.33%	5,406	33.00%	274	1.67%
1992	10,496	50.57%	6,792	32.72%	3,468	16.71%
1996	11,955	54.07%	7,786	35.22%	2,368	10.71%
2000	17,224	65.87%	8,160	31.21%	765	2.93%
2004	21,925	69.82%	9,102	28.98%	377	1.20%
2008	24,420	68.16%	11,017	30.75%	393	1.10%
2012	26,679	71.29%	10,209	27.28%	537	1.43%
2016	30,659	72.10%	9,768	22.97%	2,098	4.93%
2020	35,600	73.15%	12,176	25.02%	893	1.83%
2024	38,017	74.42%	12,414	24.30%	650	1.27%

== Attractions ==
- Beale ciphers, the key to a supposed treasure buried somewhere in the county and which has attracted treasure hunters since the 19th century
- National D-Day Memorial
- Peaks of Otter
- Poplar Forest
- Smith Mountain Lake
- Bedford Museum & Genealogical Library

== Communities ==
=== Town ===
- Bedford

=== Census-designated places ===
- Big Island
- Forest
- Moneta
- Montvale
- Stewartsville

=== Other unincorporated communities ===
- Chamblissburg
- Coleman Falls
- Goode
- Goodview
- Hardy
- Huddleston
- New London
- Thaxton

Some of these unincorporated areas have mailing addresses in Bedford town and Lynchburg.

== Notable people ==
- Nicholas H. Cobbs (1796-1861), former Episcopal prelate, served as the first Bishop of Alabama.
- Colonel Chaffin (1826 – April 1873), little person who toured the United States and was billed as the "Virginia Dwarf".
- Erik Estrada (born March 16, 1949), an American actor, voice actor, and subsequent Bedford County deputy sheriff, known for his co-starring lead role in the police drama television series, CHiPs, which ran from 1977 to 1983.
- Carl Overstreet, (1929-2015) first U2 pilot to fly over Soviet Air Space
- Thomas Jefferson had a summer retreat in Bedford County called "Poplar Forest".
- James P. Ownby (1845–1906), Illinois state representative; was born in Bedford County.
- Lacey Putney was born and raised in Bedford County.
- Jerry Falwell Jr, former Liberty University President, lives in Bedford County on a farm.
- Sam Sloan, book publisher, lives in Bedford County and attended Boonsboro School Elementary School and High School in Bedford County

== See also ==
- National Register of Historic Places listings in Bedford County, Virginia
- Bedford Public Library System
