= Bedford, Virginia =

- Incorporated town
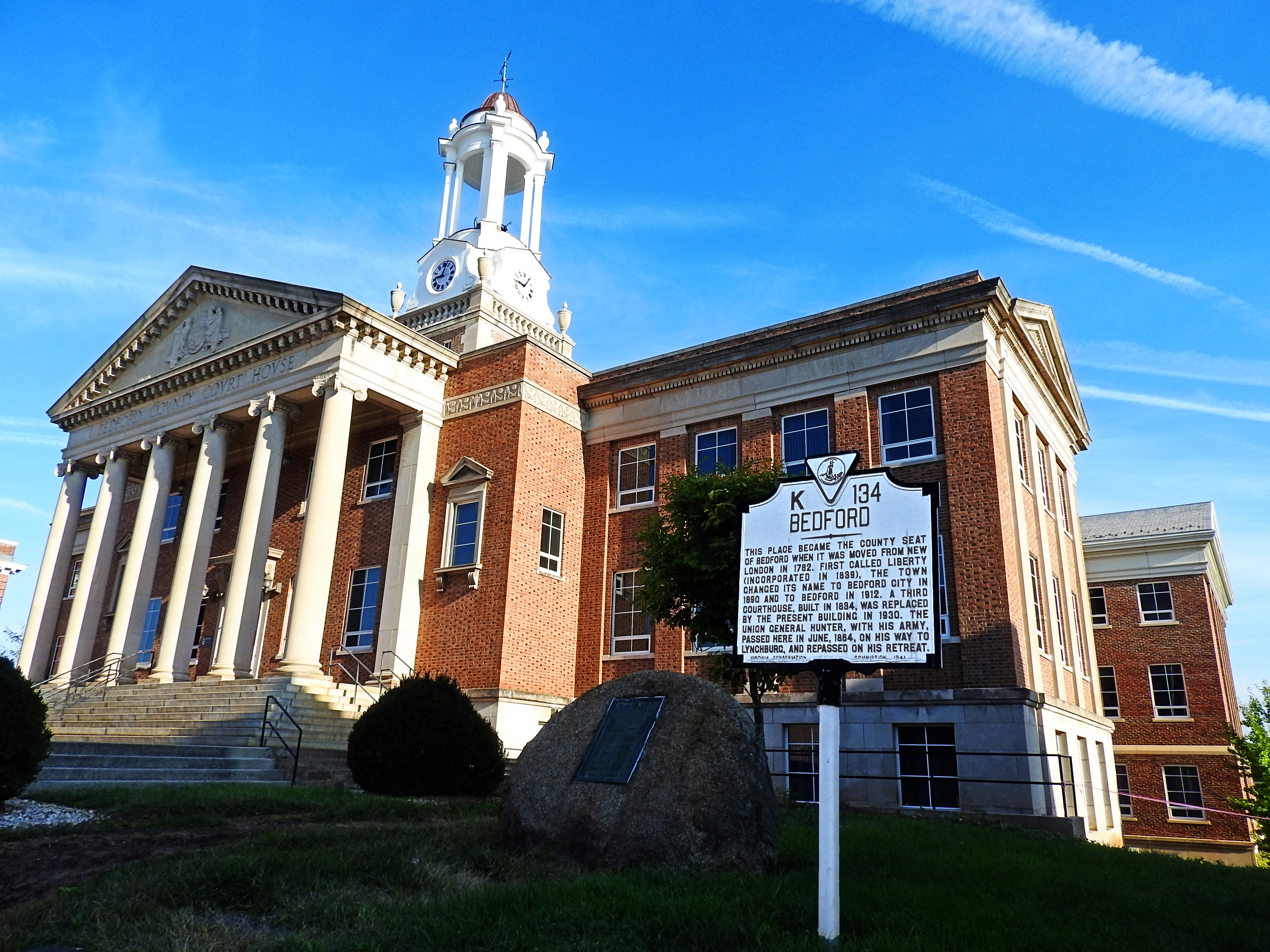
- Bedford County Courthouse

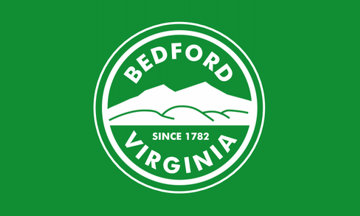
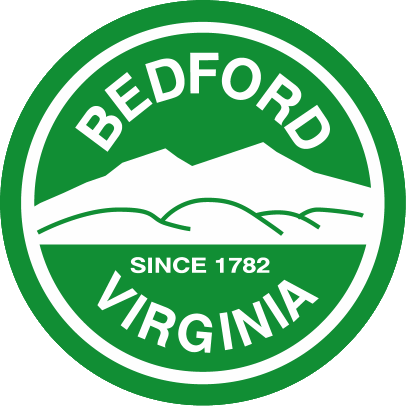
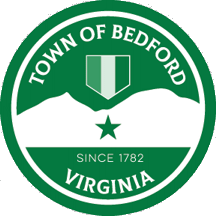
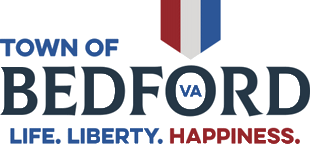
- Flag Seal Coat of arms Logo
- Nickname: The World's Best Little Town
- Motto: Life. Liberty. Happiness.
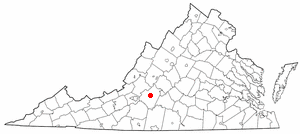
- Location in Virginia
- Coordinates: 37°20′04″N 79°31′23″W
- Country: United States
- State: Virginia
- County: Bedford

Government
  - Type: Town Council

Area
  - Total: 8.75 sq mi (22.67 km^{2})
  - Land: 8.72 sq mi (22.59 km^{2})
  - Water: 0.027 sq mi (0.07 km^{2})
- Elevation: 1,004 ft (306 m)

Population (2020)
  - Total: 6,657
  - Density: 763.2/sq mi (294.7/km^{2})
- Time zone: UTC-5 (Eastern (EST))
  - Summer (DST): UTC-4 (EDT)
- ZIP code: 24523
- Area code: 540
- FIPS code: 51-05544
- GNIS feature ID: 1498450
- Website: http://www.bedfordva.gov

Bedford is an incorporated town and former independent city located within Bedford County in the U.S. state of Virginia. It serves as the county seat of Bedford County. As of the 2020 census, the population was 6,657. It is part of the Lynchburg metropolitan area.

Bedford County surrounds the town and has the Blue Ridge Mountains to the north, Smith Mountain Lake to the south, Lynchburg to the east, and Roanoke to the west.

== History ==
Bedford was originally known as Liberty, "named after the Colonial victory over Cornwallis at Yorktown." Founded as a village in 1782, Liberty became Bedford County's seat of government, replacing New London which had become part of the newly formed Campbell County. Liberty became a town in 1839 and in 1890 changed its name to Bedford City. In 1912, Bedford reverted to town status, it resumed city status in 1968, and once more it reverted to a town in 2013. In November 1923, the town was the site of an accidental mass poisoning in which nine men were killed after drinking apple cider served at the Elks National Home. A local farmer had produced the drink and stored in a barrel that had been used to hold a pesticide.

Bedford is home to the National D-Day Memorial (despite the "National" in its name, the memorial is owned and operated by a non-governmental, non-profit, education foundation). The United States Congress warranted that this memorial would be the nation's D-Day Memorial and President Bill Clinton authorized this effort in September 1996. President George W. Bush dedicated this memorial as the nation's D-Day memorial on June 6, 2001. Bedford lost more residents per capita in the Normandy landings than any other American community at almost 0.7%. Nineteen of the thirty-four Virginia National Guard soldiers from Bedford who were in Company A, 116th Infantry Regiment, 29th Infantry Division were killed on D-Day, and four more died during the rest of the Normandy campaign, two of them from other 116th companies. With a 1944 population of about 3,200, proportionally this community suffered the nation's most severe D-Day losses; explaining the location of the memorial.

Bedford was designated as an independent city in 1968, but remained the county seat of Bedford County. Its status as an independent city was ended on July 1, 2013, returning to a town within Bedford County.

== Geography ==
According to the United States Census Bureau, the town has a total area of 6.9 square miles (18 km^{2}), of which 6.9 square miles (18 km^{2}) is land and 0.02 square miles (0.052 km^{2}) (0.3%) is water.

Bedford sits at the foot of the Peaks of Otter.

== Demographics ==
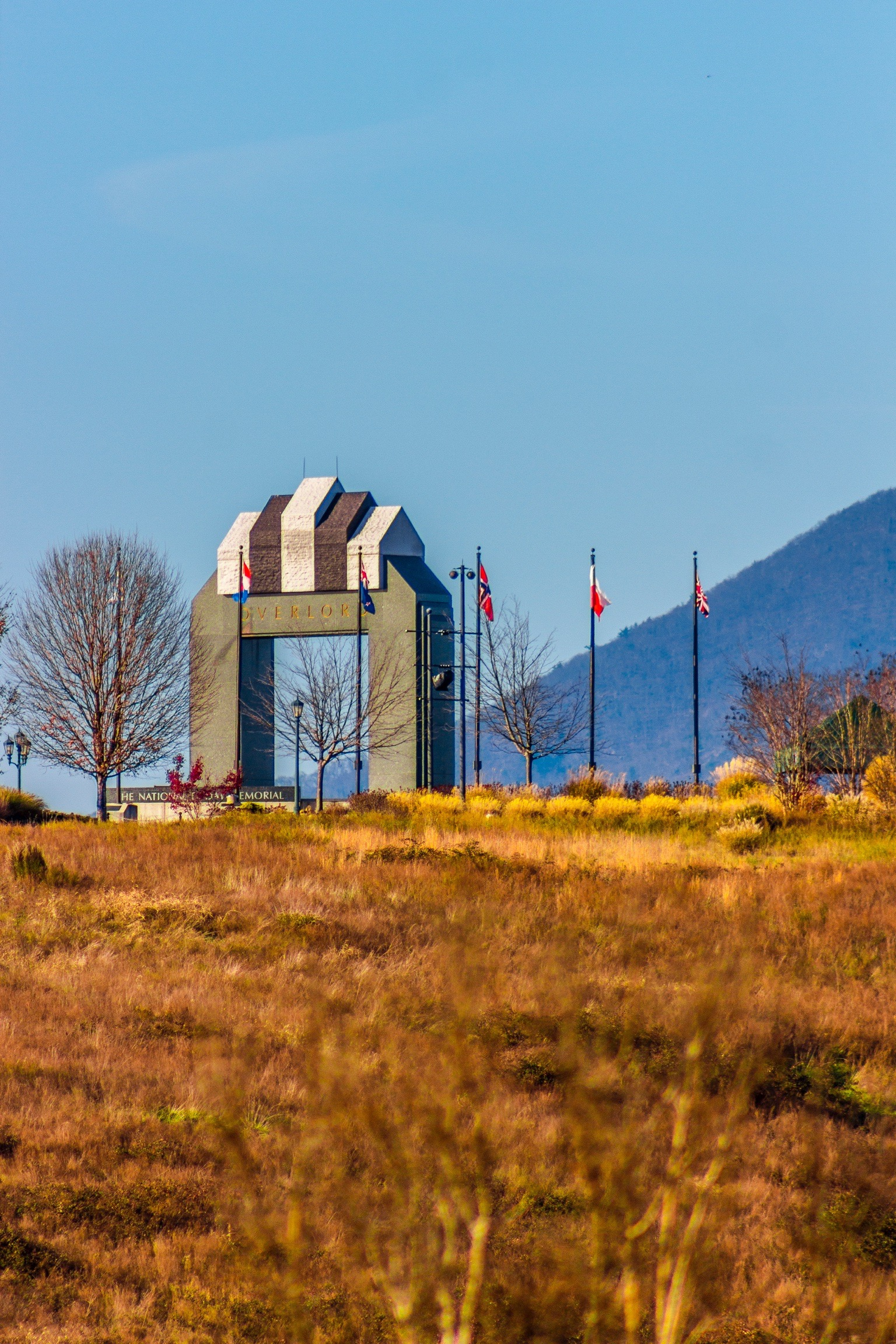
The D-Day National Memorial, as viewed from the nearby visitor center

Historical population
Census	Pop.	Note	%±
1860	722		—
1870	1,208		67.3%
1880	2,191		81.4%
1890	2,897		32.2%
1900	2,416		−16.6%
1910	2,508		3.8%
1920	3,243		29.3%
1930	3,713		14.5%
1940	3,973		7.0%
1950	4,061		2.2%
1960	5,921		45.8%
1970	6,011		1.5%
1980	5,991		−0.3%
1990	6,073		1.4%
2000	6,299		3.7%
2010	6,222		−1.2%
2020	6,657		7.0%
U.S. Decennial Census; 1790-1960 1900-1990; 1990-2000 2010-2012

=== 2020 census ===
At the 2020 census there were 6,657 people in the town. There were 3,163 housing units. The racial makeup of the city was 74.4% White, 16.8% Black or African American, 0.2% American Indian, 0.7% Asian, 0.1% Pacific Islander, 1.2% from other races, and 6.7% from two or more races. Hispanic or Latino of any race were 2.9%.

=== 2000 census ===
At the 2000 census there were 6,299 people in 2,519 households, including 1,592 families, in the then city. The population density was 914.5 persons per square mile (353.1 persons/km^{2}). There were 2,702 housing units at an average density of 392.3 per square mile (151.5/km^{2}). The racial makeup of the city was 75.33% White, 22.38% Black or African American, 0.24% Native American, 0.57% Asian, 0.08% Pacific Islander, 0.24% from other races, and 1.16% from two or more races. Hispanic or Latino of any race were 0.89%.

Of the 2,519 households, 27.7% had children under the age of 18 living with them, 43.0% were married couples living together, 17.2% had a female householder with no husband present, and 36.8% were non-families. 33.0% of households were one person, and 15.7% were one person aged 65 or older. The average household size was 2.26 and the average family size was 2.87.

In the city the population was spread out, with 21.6% under the age of 18, 7.2% from 18 to 24, 27.8% from 25 to 44, 20.7% from 45 to 64, and 22.6% 65 or older. The median age was 41 years. For every 100 females, there were 90.6 males. For every 100 females age 18 and over, there were 85.4 males.

The median household income was $29,792 and the median family income was $35,023. Males had a median income of $31,668 versus $18,065 for females. The per capita income for the city was $15,423. About 11.4% of families and 12.7% of the population were below the poverty line, including 19.4% of those under age 18 and 11.1% of those age 65 or over.

== Economy ==
=== Top employers ===
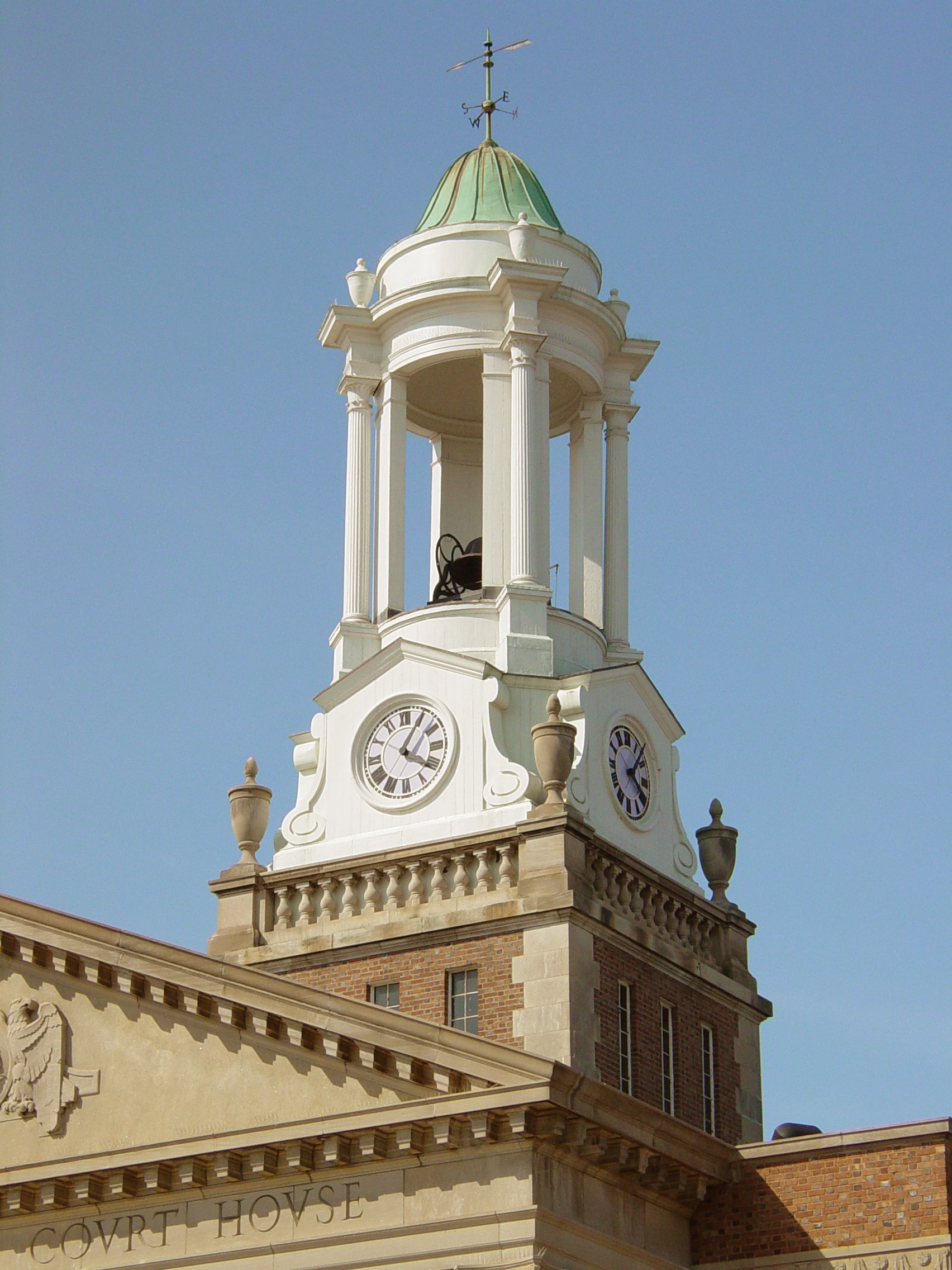
The cupola atop the Bedford County Court House was built in 1866.

According to the town's 2022 Annual Comprehensive Financial Report, the top employers in the town are:

#	Employer	# of Employees
1	Centra Bedford Memorial Hospital & Centra Medical Group	364
2	Bedford County Public Schools	315
3	Walmart	301
4	Sam Moore Furniture LLC	237
5	Smyth Companies Bedford	132
6	Cintas	130
7	Bedford Weaving Mills	123
8	Lowe's	117
9	English Meadows	70
10	Food Lion	63

== Education ==
Bedford is served by Bedford County Public Schools. Public school students residing in Bedford are zoned to attend Bedford Elementary School, Liberty Middle School, and Liberty High School.

When Bedford was an independent city, a "Bedford City Public Schools" school district existed. In 1959 Bedford town began to contract to the county school system. In 1984 there were plans to re-establish a separate municipal school system.

Central Virginia Community College operates a branch campus in Bedford.

== Climate ==
The climate in this area is characterized by mild, humid summers and generally mild to cool winters. According to the Köppen Climate Classification system, Bedford has a humid subtropical climate, abbreviated "Cfa" on climate maps.

Climate data for Bedford, Virginia (1991–2020 normals, extremes 1893–present)
Month	Jan	Feb	Mar	Apr	May	Jun	Jul	Aug	Sep	Oct	Nov	Dec	Year
Record high °F (°C)	81 (27)	79 (26)	89 (32)	95 (35)	100 (38)	102 (39)	104 (40)	101 (38)	100 (38)	99 (37)	87 (31)	73 (23)	104 (40)
Mean daily maximum °F (°C)	46.9 (8.3)	49.9 (9.9)	58.1 (14.5)	69.7 (20.9)	74.7 (23.7)	82.4 (28.0)	86.4 (30.2)	85.2 (29.6)	78.9 (26.1)	68.7 (20.4)	58.8 (14.9)	49.5 (9.7)	67.4 (19.7)
Daily mean °F (°C)	37.3 (2.9)	39.2 (4.0)	47.1 (8.4)	57.4 (14.1)	64.3 (17.9)	72.1 (22.3)	76.5 (24.7)	74.9 (23.8)	68.7 (20.4)	57.5 (14.2)	48.1 (8.9)	40.4 (4.7)	57.0 (13.9)
Mean daily minimum °F (°C)	27.8 (−2.3)	28.5 (−1.9)	36.0 (2.2)	45.1 (7.3)	53.8 (12.1)	61.8 (16.6)	66.7 (19.3)	64.7 (18.2)	58.6 (14.8)	46.2 (7.9)	37.3 (2.9)	31.3 (−0.4)	46.5 (8.1)
Record low °F (°C)	−10 (−23)	−6 (−21)	4 (−16)	20 (−7)	28 (−2)	36 (2)	43 (6)	42 (6)	29 (−2)	21 (−6)	8 (−13)	−6 (−21)	−10 (−23)
Average precipitation inches (mm)	3.62 (92)	3.01 (76)	3.45 (88)	3.85 (98)	4.60 (117)	4.71 (120)	4.29 (109)	3.81 (97)	4.37 (111)	3.59 (91)	3.27 (83)	3.74 (95)	46.31 (1,176)
Source: NOAA

== Transportation ==
U.S. Route 221 runs through the town; and U.S. Route 460 circumvents the main part of town. State routes 43 and 122 converge onto the town.

Until the late 1960s, there were three different Southern Railway/Norfolk & Western Railroad trains operating daily at Bedford station.

- Birmingham Special—New York City to Birmingham, and branch to Memphis
- Pelican—New York to New Orleans
- Tennessean—Washington to Memphis

Amtrak service to Roanoke travels through, but there were plans to build a new station stop in Bedford.

== International links ==
Bedford has a Friendship Treaty with:

- Ivybridge, Devon, England (signed in 2004).

Bedford maintains relationships with 11 communities on the Normandy Coast of France. One sister city, Trévières, France, sent Bedford an exact replica of its own World War I memorial statue. The face of the statue was damaged in World War II by artillery fire from US forces retaking the town. The Bedford statue also bears these wounds and is erected on the grounds of the National D-Day Memorial.

== Notable people ==
- Roger Anderson, NFL player
- F.W. Caulkins, architect
- Lawrence Chambers, the first African American to command a U.S. Navy aircraft carrier and the first African American graduate of the Naval Academy to reach flag rank.
- Joseph P. Cleland. U.S. Army major general
- John Goode Jr., Virginia Congressman, Solicitor General of the United States
- Richard Urquhart Goode, geographer with the United States Geological Survey and Panama Canal
- Carol M. Swain, American political scientist and legal scholar
- The "Bedford Boys", 34 local men who served in the National Guard's 116th Infantry Regiment during the amphibious landing on Omaha Beach on D-Day in World War II.
