= Pittsville, Virginia =

Unincorporated community in Virginia, US

Coordinates: 36°58′55″N 79°27′43″W

Pittsville is an unincorporated community in Pittsylvania County, in the U.S. state of Virginia.

== Economy ==
Pittsville has a small general store named Woody's Country Store and a Post Office The primary industries are tied to agriculture, forest resources and real estate. There are views of Smith Mountain, Peaks of Otter and The Blue Ridge Mountains in the area. The real estate market has seen recent interest because of increased development on nearby Leesville Lake and Smith Mountain Lake.

== History ==
Pittsville played an important role in early history of Virginia. Early mineral prospectors found iron ore in the form of Brown Hematite and magnetic ore in the 1860s and in 1878 the Franklin and Pittsylvania Railroad was chartered as a means of transporting the ore to market. The population at this time was approximately 80 persons. At the same time, a seven-mile section of track was laid by the Washington City, Virginia Midland & Great Southern Railroad to connect Pittsville with Franklin Junction (Gretna). This branch was called the Pittsylvania Railroad. It connected to the Franklin and Pittsylvania Railroad which ran west from Pittsville to Rocky Mount. Circa 1888, iron ore supplies were nearly exhausted and the railway was subsisting mainly for transport of lumber. The Railroad later fell into bankruptcy and was abandoned by 1932.

Pittsville today is a small community. As of 2008 the ZIP code of its post office included 220 households, and several new developments on Leesville Lake such as Mountain View Shores, Leesville Landing, Parker's Landing, and Eagle Point Shores and part of the nearby community of Brights.
