= Huddleston, Virginia =

Unincorporated community in Virginia, United States

- Unincorporated community
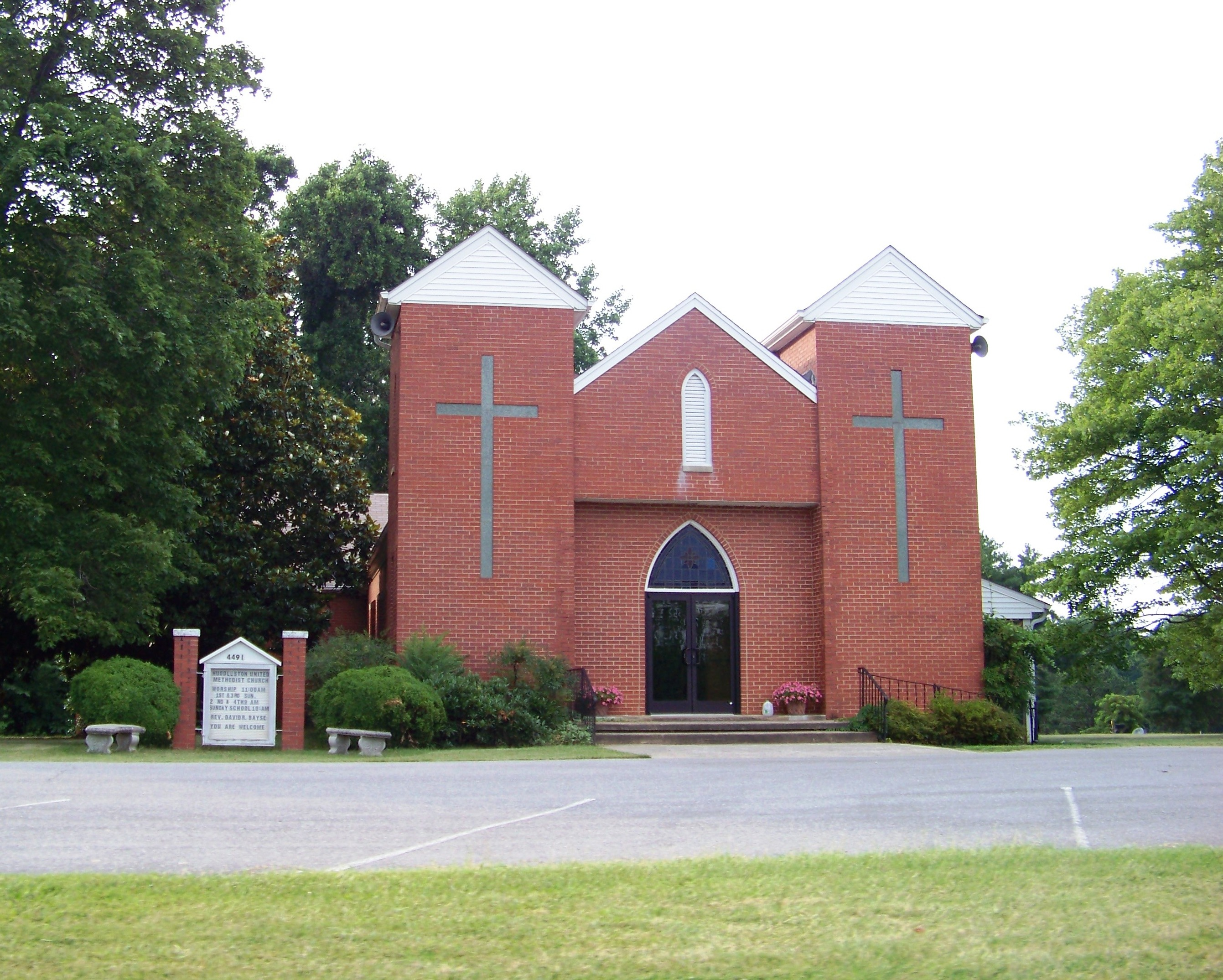
- Huddleston United Methodist Church

- Location within Virginia Location within the United States
- Coordinates: 37°09′25″N 79°28′28″W
- Country: United States
- State: Virginia
- County: Bedford
- Elevation: 597 ft (182 m)
- Time zone: UTC-5 (Eastern (EST))
  - Summer (DST): UTC-4 (EDT)
- ZIP Code: 24104
- Area codes: 540 and 826
- GNIS feature ID: 1477429

Huddleston is an unincorporated community in southeastern Bedford County, Virginia, United States. The community lies along State Route 626 and is located 12.5 miles (20.1 km) south-southeast of Bedford. It is part of the Lynchburg Metropolitan Statistical Area.

== Geography ==
=== Climate ===
The climate in this area is characterized by hot, humid summers and generally mild to cool winters. According to the Köppen Climate Classification system, Huddleston has a humid subtropical climate, abbreviated "Cfa" on climate maps.

== Parks and recreation ==
Smith Mountain Lake State Park is located south of Huddleston. The 1,148-acre state park provides facilities for camping, picnicking, hiking, and has a public beach.

Craddock Creek Marina, Lake Haven Marina, Mitchell's Point Marina, and Parkway Marina provide waterfront access to Smith Mountain Lake.

== Government ==
The United States Postal Service operates the Huddleston Post Office within the community. The post office has the ZIP Code of 24104. The original post office opened on August 28, 1909.

== Education ==
The community is served by Bedford County Public Schools. Public school students residing in Huddleston are zoned to attend Huddleston Elementary School, Staunton River Middle School, and Staunton River High School.

The closest higher education institutions are located in Bedford and Lynchburg.

== Infrastructure ==
The Smith Mountain Dam, operated by American Electric Power, is located southeast of Huddleston.

=== Public safety ===
Law enforcement is provided by the Bedford County Sheriff's Office. Fire protection is provided by the Huddleston Volunteer Fire Department, which operates from four fire stations within the community. Emergency medical services are provided by the Huddleston Life Saving and First Aid Crew.

== Transportation ==
=== Air ===
The Smith Mountain Lake Airport and the New London Airport are the closest public-use airports to the community. The Lynchburg Regional Airport is the closest airport with commercial service.

=== Roads ===
- Virginia State Route 43 (Leesville Road)
- Virginia State Route 626 (Smith Mountain Lake Parkway)

=== Rail ===
The Norfolk Southern operated Altavista District runs through the community. The closest passenger rail service is located in Lynchburg.
