= Smith Mountain =

Smith Mountain is the name of over thirty summits in the United States, including:

- Smith Mountain (Blue Ridge Mountains) a range in northern Pittsylvania County, Virginia, from which Smith Mountain Lake gets its name.
- Smith Mountain (Taconic Mountains), a peak in western Massachusetts.
- Smith Mountain (Death Valley), a peak in Death Valley National Park in California.
