= Alella (disambiguation) =

Alella is a town in Maresme county, Catalonia, Spain.

Alella may also refer to:

- Alella (DO), a wine-growing region around the abovementioned town
- Alella (crustacean), a genus of copepods (crustaceans)
