= Tracheliastes polycolpus =

Scientific classification
- Kingdom: Animalia
- Phylum: Arthropoda
- Class: Copepoda
- Order: Siphonostomatoida
- Family: Lernaeopodidae
- Genus: Tracheliastes
- Species: T. polycolpus

Binomial name
- Tracheliastes polycolpus Nordmann, 1832

Species of crustacean

Tracheliastes polycolpus is a species of copepod in the family Lernaeopodidae. It is an ectoparasite of a number of freshwater fish in Western Europe, including the beaked dace Leuciscus burdigalensis, the common dace Leuciscus leuciscus, and occasionally a few other fish species. The subspecies Tracheliastes polycolpus baicalensis has been described from Lake Baikal. The parasite attaches itself to the fins of the host, and lives on the mucus and epithelial cells of the host.

== Life cycle ==
T. polycolpus find fish and attach themselves primarily onto the fins. The female T. polycolpus prefer to attach themselves onto the anal and pelvic fins. After attaching themselves onto the fish, they feed on their epithelial cells and mucus on the host. Then find a new host to feed on afterwards. Eggs attached onto the surface of the female the size of the eggs and female would depend on the size of the fish being infected.

== Symptoms ==
Infestation with T. polycolpus can cause blisters on the fins of fish, and the loss of rays on pelvic, anal, pectoral, dorsal and caudal fins. By removing the rays of the fishes' fins, they prevent the fish from swimming which means that they are unable to feed, reproduce, migrate, and avoid predators. Susceptibility to T. polycolpus depends on both host genotype and the environment.
