= Leesville Lake =

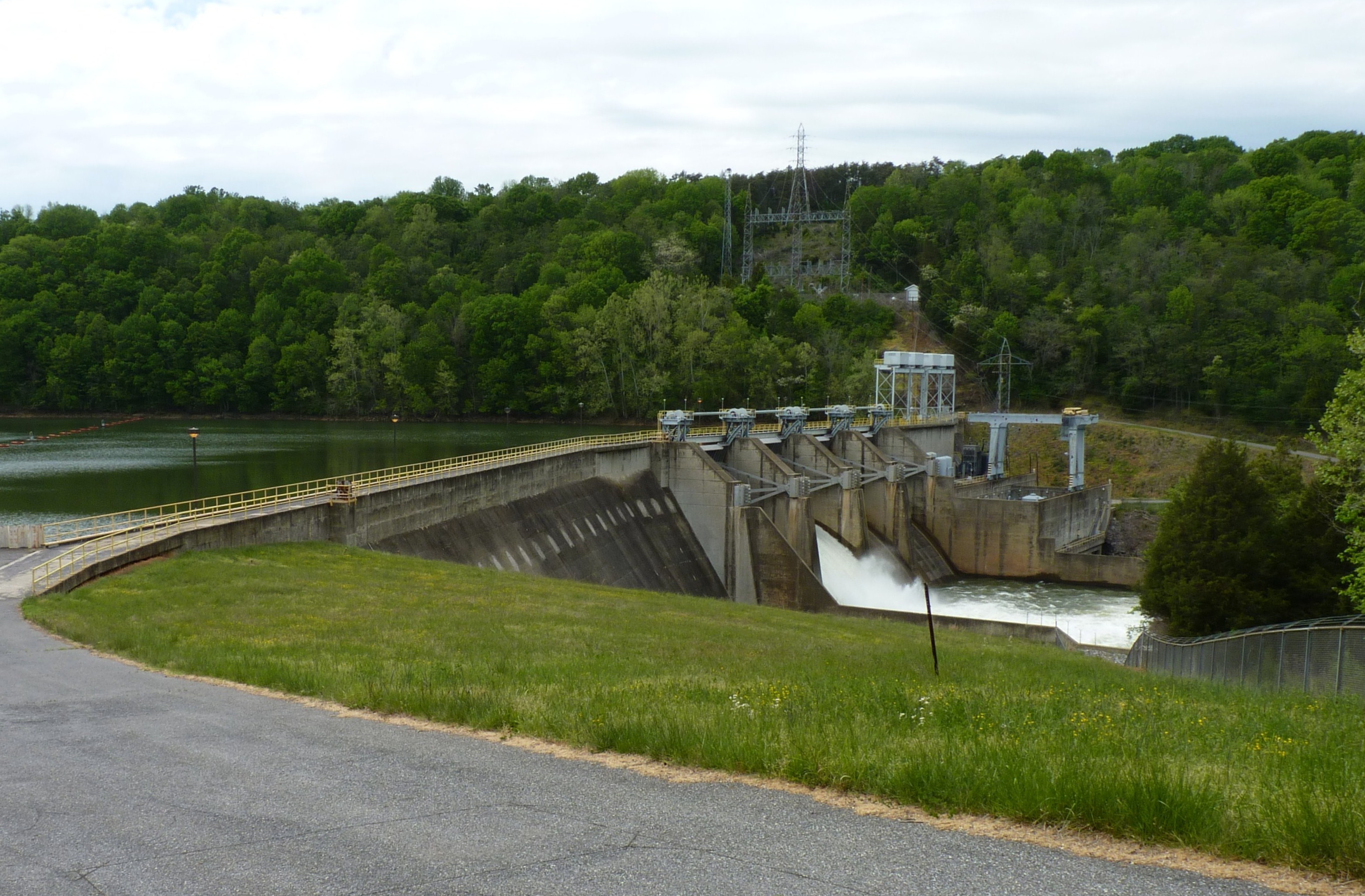
- Leesville Lake Dam

- Location within Virginia Location within the United States
- Location: Pittsylvania, Bedford, and Campbell counties, Virginia
- Coordinates: 37°05′34″N 079°24′06″W
- Type: Reservoir
- Primary inflows: Smith Mountain Lake, Roanoke River
- Primary outflows: Roanoke River
- Basin countries: United States
- Max. length: 17 mi (27 km)
- Max. width: 1,600 ft (490 m)
- Surface area: 3,270 acres (13.2 km^{2})
- Max. depth: 75 ft (23 m)
- Shore length^{1}: 110 mi (180 km)
- Surface elevation: 600–613 ft (183–187 m)
- ^{1} Shore length is not a well-defined measure.

Leesville Lake is a reservoir in Virginia used for hydroelectric power generation in conjunction with Smith Mountain Lake as a pump storage project. It is located southeast of Roanoke, and southwest of Lynchburg.

Smaller and lower than Smith Mountain Lake, Leesville Lake covers 3,270 acres (13.2 km^{2}) and contains 94,900 acre-feet (117,100,000 m^{3}) of water at full pond. The lake is 17 miles (27 km) long with around 110 miles (180 km) of shoreline. The reservoir lies in a broad valley nestled in the Blue Ridge Mountains of rural southwestern Virginia of the Appalachian chain. Before the lake's creation, farming and logging were the primary industries.

== Power generation ==
Initial proposals were made in the late 1920s to dam the Roanoke River and the Blackwater River at the Smith Mountain gorge to generate electricity. Construction of the Smith Mountain Dam began in 1960 and was completed in 1963.

The dam produces hydro-electric power mostly during hours of peak demand on the American Electric Power system. Water passes from Smith Mountain Lake through generators to Leesville Lake, producing power. In times of low demand, the generators are used as pumps to reverse the flow and return the water to Smith Mountain Lake.

This takes advantage of the more or less constant output of steam generation plants in off-peak periods. In its partnership role with Smith Mountain Lake generating power, Leesville Lake has a maximum refill rate of 1.33 feet (41 cm) per hour and a maximum drawdown rate of 0.46 feet (14 cm) per hour. Normal fluctuation consists of two to eight feet (0.6 to 2.4 m) on average with an absolute maximum of thirteen feet (4.0 m), allowing Leesville Lake to avoid the drastic drawdowns of other area lakes.

== Recreation and development ==
Since the 1960s, the area around Leesville Lake has remained relatively rural and remote with mostly corn, tobacco, small family farms and other agriculture. The limited early residential developments around the lake consisted largely of family farms. Since about 2004, however, residential growth has begun to expand rather quickly and lakefront homes and communities now dot the shoreline. Boat traffic on the lake remains low relative to nearby Smith Mountain Lake, Kerr Lake and Lake Gaston.

Leesville Lake is becoming a popular recreational area. Fishing is very popular, especially for striped bass. The 53-pound-7-ounce (24.2 kg) state record striped bass was caught out of Leesville Lake in 2000. Boating, water skiing, wakeboarding, and riding personal watercraft are also common activities.

Access to Leesville Lake is primarily by way of U.S. Route 29, although State Route 43 and State Route 40 provide access to the north and south sides of the lake, respectively.
