= Achtheres percarum =

Scientific classification
- Domain: Eukaryota
- Kingdom: Animalia
- Phylum: Arthropoda
- Class: Copepoda
- Order: Siphonostomatoida
- Family: Lernaeopodidae
- Genus: Achtheres
- Species: A. percarum

Binomial name
- Achtheres percarum Nordmann, 1832

Species of crustacean

Achtheres percarum is a species of arthropod belonging to the family Lernaeopodidae.

Synonym:

- Achtheres sibirica Messjatzeff, 1928
