= Smith Mountain Lake State Park =

State park in Virginia, United States

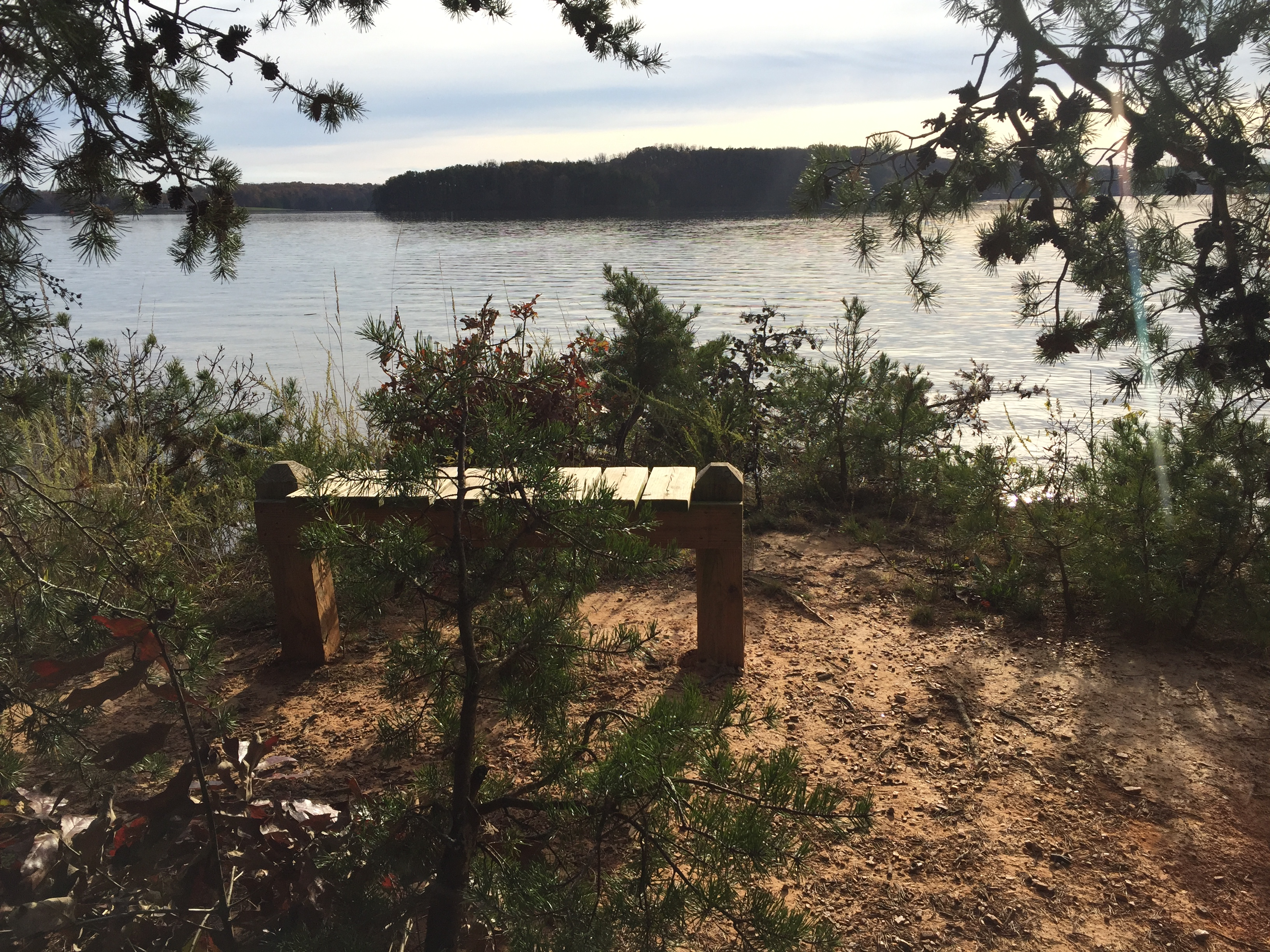
- Smith Mountain Lake State Park in Virginia

- Location within Virginia Location within the United States
- Location: 1235 State Park Road, Huddleston, Virginia
- Coordinates: 37°5′48″N 79°35′39″W
- Area: 1,148 acres (4.65 km^{2})
- Established: 1983
- Governing body: Virginia Department of Conservation and Recreation

Smith Mountain Lake State Park is a 1,148-acre (4.65 km^{2}) state park along the shores of Smith Mountain Lake in Bedford County, Virginia near Huddleston. Primarily a recreational area, it offers water-related activities (with a swimming area, occasional boat tours as well as rental boats, kayaks and tubes) as well as camping, picnicking, and hiking facilities. A Visitor Center and Discovery Center also offer interpretive ecological activities, and periodically the Friends of Smith Mountain Lake Park arrange concerts.

== History ==
Smith Mountain Lake was created by Appalachian Power after construction of a dam across the Roanoke River across Smith Mountain Gap which began in 1960 and was completed in 1966. Appalachian Power began donating parcels of land which now constitute the park in 1967. Construction of the dam involved engineering challenges because the Roanoke River's flow at that gap was inadequate using technology available in the 19th and early 20th century (when first envisioned), but German engineers developed a reservoir technique that allowed power generation from less voluminous rivers using reservoirs by the mid-20th century. Another challenge involved acquiring the land which would be flooded, and relocating numerous cemeteries as required by longstanding Virginia state law. The park was opened to the public in 1983. Roanoke delegate A. Victor Thomas championed Virginia conservation efforts, as well as a bond issue which passed overwhelmingly and permitted construction of rental cabins at the park.

== See also ==
- List of Virginia state parks
- Smith Mountain Dam for more information on the dam that created Smith Mountain Lake.
