= Moneta, Virginia =

Unincorporated community in Virginia, United States

- Census-designated place
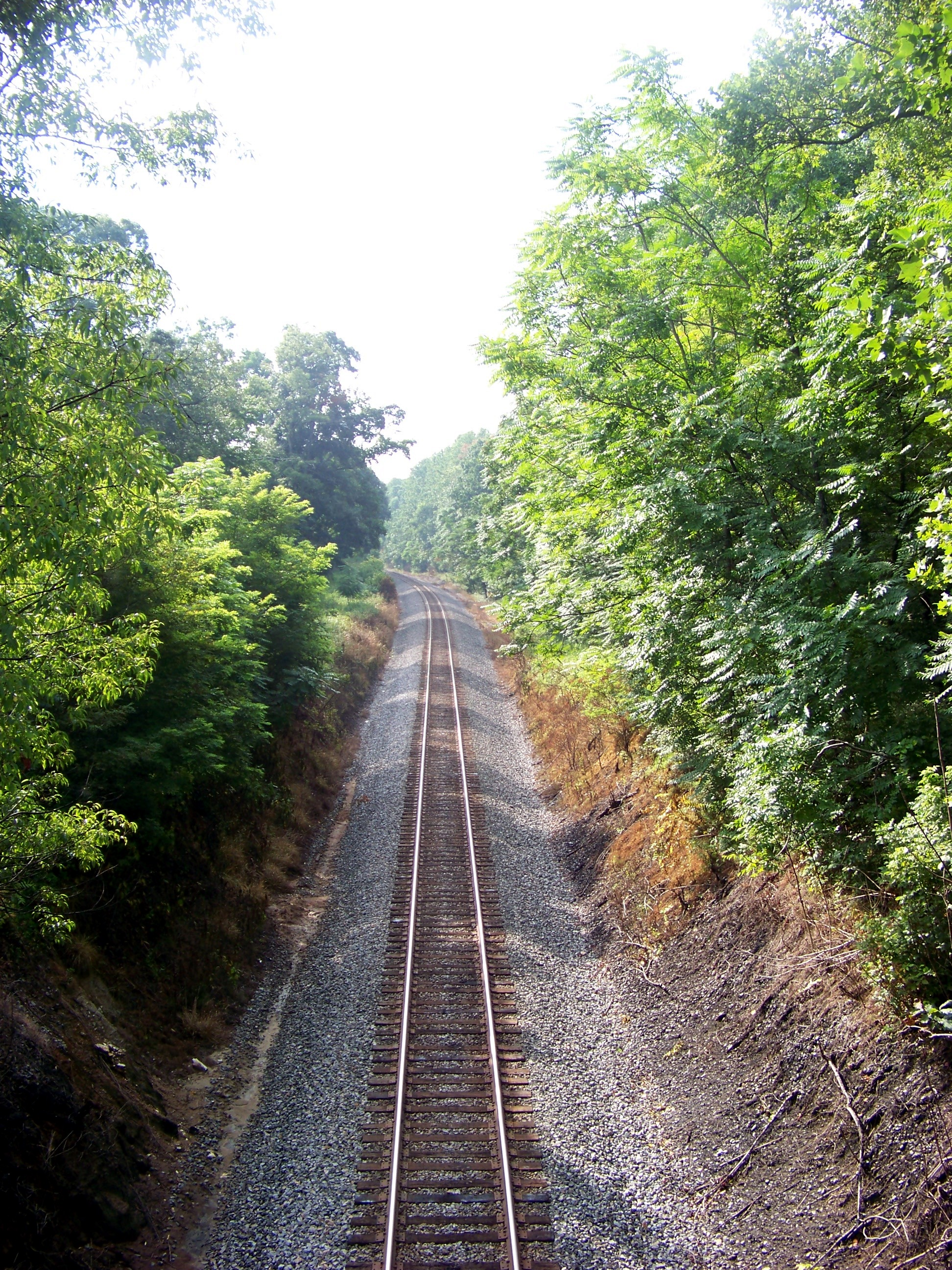
- Railroad tracks near Moneta

- Location within Virginia Location within the United States
- Coordinates: 37°10′53″N 79°37′2″W
- Country: United States
- State: Virginia
- County: Bedford

Area
  - Total: 3.846 sq mi (9.96 km^{2})
  - Land: 3.834 sq mi (9.93 km^{2})
  - Water: 0.012 sq mi (0.031 km^{2})
- Elevation: 860 ft (260 m)

Population (2020)
  - Total: 450
  - Density: 120/sq mi (45/km^{2})
- Time zone: UTC-5 (Eastern (EST))
  - Summer (DST): UTC-4 (EDT)
- ZIP Code: 24121
- Area codes: 540 and 826
- FIPS code: 51-52536
- GNIS feature ID: 2807404

Moneta (/məniːtə/ or /moʊniːtə/) is a census-designated place (CDP) in southern Bedford County, Virginia, United States. The community is located along Route 122 between the towns of Bedford and Rocky Mount. It is part of the Lynchburg Metropolitan Statistical Area. As of the 2020 census, Moneta had a population of 450.

== History ==
Olive Branch Missionary Baptist Church and the Holland-Duncan House are listed on the National Register of Historic Places.

On August 26, 2015, the community made news when journalists Alison Parker and Adam Ward were murdered on live television by former colleague Vester Flanagan at a nearby shopping center and marina.

== Geography ==
According to the United States Census Bureau, the CDP has a total area of 3.846 square miles (9.96 km²).

== Demographics ==
Historical population
Census	Pop.	Note	%±
2020	450		—
Source: U.S. Census Bureau

Moneta first appeared as a census designated place in the 2020 U.S. census.

=== 2020 census ===
The community was delineated by the United States Census Bureau for the first time during the 2020 census.

As of the census of 2020, there were 450 people residing in the CDP. There were 223 housing units. The racial makeup of the CDP was 81.8% White, 6.9% African American or Black, 0.0% American Indian, 0.7% Asian, 0.0% Pacific Islander, 2.4% from other races, and 8.2% from two or more races. Hispanic or Latino of any race were 6.7% of the population.

== Parks and recreation ==
Moneta Park, a 119-acre public park maintained by the Bedford County Parks and Recreation Department, is located in the CDP. The park features two multi-use ball fields, a football field, an 18-hole disc golf course, picnic shelters, and walking trails.

Waterwheel Marina, Bridgewater Marina, and Crystal Shores Marina Resort offer waterfront access to Smith Mountain Lake.

== Government ==
The United States Postal Service operates the Moneta Post Office within the CDP. The Moneta ZIP Code extends to both sides of Smith Mountain Lake, including parts of Franklin County, since there is no Smith Mountain Lake postal address.

== Education ==
The CDP is served by Bedford County Public Schools. Public school students residing in Moneta are zoned to attend Moneta Elementary School, Staunton River Middle School, and Staunton River High School.

The closest higher education institutions are located in Bedford, Lynchburg, and Roanoke.

== Infrastructure ==
The Bedford Regional Water Authority operates a public water and wastewater system within the CDP.

=== Public safety ===
Law enforcement is provided by the Bedford County Sheriff's Office, which maintains a field office within the CDP. Fire protection is provided by Moneta Volunteer Fire Department, which operates three fire stations, including one within the CDP. Emergency medical services are provided by the Moneta Volunteer Rescue Squad and Bedford County Department of Fire and Rescue.

=== Transportation ===
==== Air ====
The Smith Mountain Lake Airport is the closest general aviation airport to Moneta. The Roanoke-Blacksburg Regional Airport and Lynchburg Regional Airport are the closest airports with commercial service.

==== Highway ====
- Virginia Route 122 (Moneta Road)

==== Rail ====
The Norfolk Southern operated Altavista District runs through the CDP. The closest passenger rail service is located in Roanoke and Lynchburg.

== In popular culture ==
Moneta was popularized as the filming location for scenes in the 1991 movie What About Bob?. In the movie, Bob arrived by bus with his goldfish and went into a local general store, which still stands, albeit in a disheveled state because it is no longer open.
