= Lake Gaston Resort =

Coordinates: 36.560426°N 77.865798°W

The Club/Lake Gaston Resort is a private, camping and recreational vehicle resort, located on the shores of Lake Gaston in South Central Virginia. The resort is in the NE quadrant of the lake known as Pea Hill Creek.

Located on Route 626 in Brunswick County, Virginia the Club Resort consists of approximately 60.85 acres of land. The resort has 110 campsites. Each site has water, sewer, electrical service and space available to park at least one automobile and one recreational vehicle. Lakefront motel rooms and park model units may be rented by members and first time visitors. The resort has paved tree-lined roads and paved biking and golf cart trails. Other amenities include a lakefront outdoor pool and snack bar, a marina with gas pumps and convenience store, a private boat ramp and 85 boat slips. Built in 2004, the Family Fun and Fitness Center has an indoor heated pool, a racquetball court, a workout room/gym, an arcade with indoor miniature golf, a 10 lane bowling alley and a snack bar. The Club Resort also has a 22,000-square-foot (2,000 m^{2}) clubhouse, which contains a full-service restaurant, an indoor hot tub, and separate saunas for men and women. The clubhouse may be reserved, by non-members, for private functions such as weddings and corporate events.

Omni International Services, Inc., a Nevada corporation, is the developer and managing entity of the Club Resort. The developer is affiliated with a reciprocal camping program known as Resorts of Distinction (ROD).

== Lake Gaston ==
Located on the North Carolina/Virginia border between I-85 and I-95, Lake Gaston encompasses portions of Halifax, Northampton and Warren Counties in North Carolina and Brunswick and Mecklenburg Counties in Virginia. Lake Gaston was created in 1963 when Virginia Electric and Power (now Dominion Virginia Power) built a hydroelectric dam on the Roanoke River. The lake has more than 350 miles (560 km) of shoreline, 20,000 surface acres, is 34 miles (55 km) long and has an average depth of 40 feet (12 m). The lake provides facilities for fishing, boating, water sports of all types as well as fish and wildlife preservation.
