= Holland–Duncan House =

Historic house in Virginia, United States

- U.S. National Register of Historic Places
- Virginia Landmarks Register
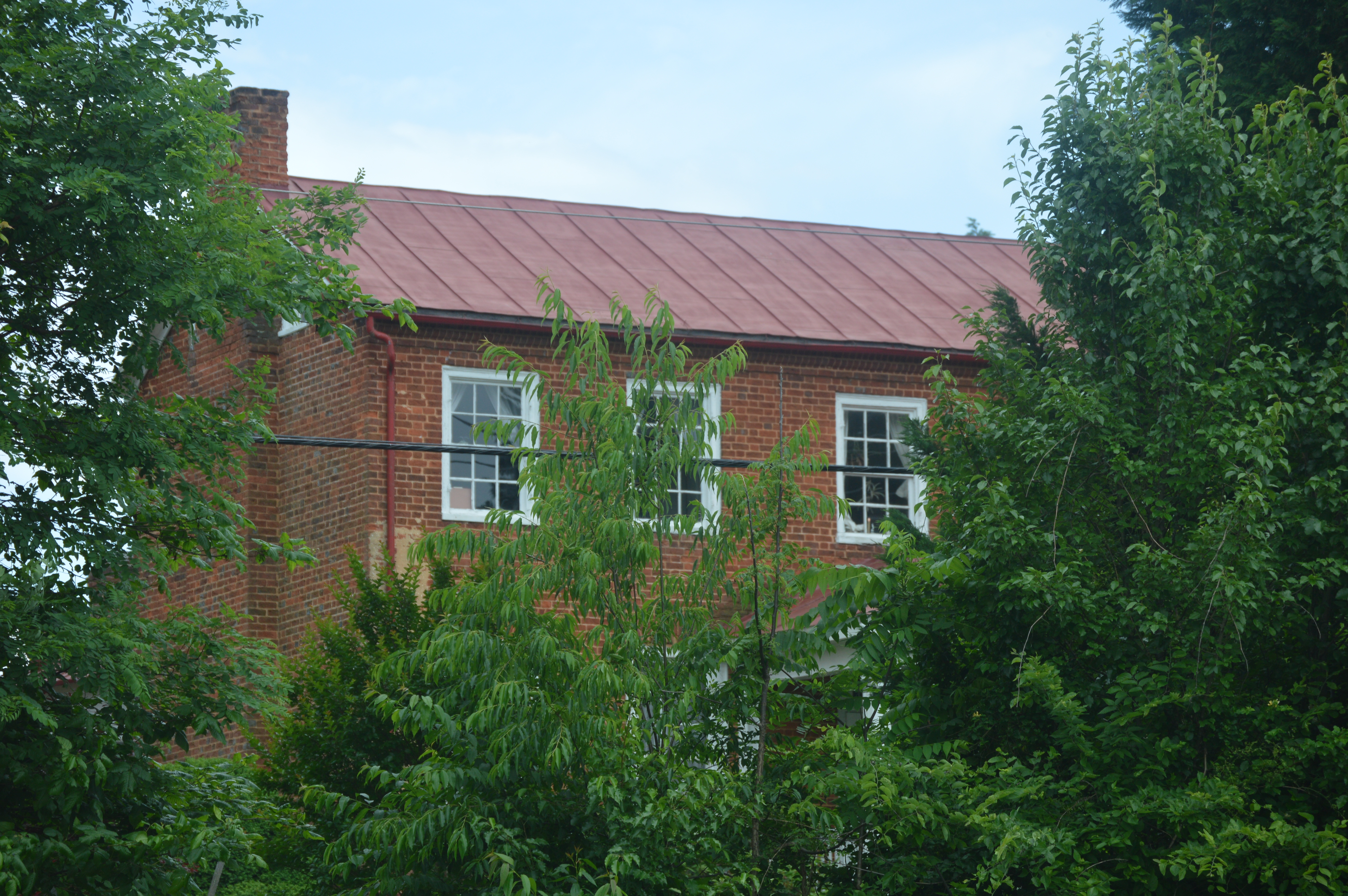
- Front of the house

- Location within Virginia Location within the United States
- Location: 13508 Booker T. Washington Hwy, Moneta, Virginia
- Coordinates: 37°7′13″N 79°42′41″W
- Area: 2 acres (0.81 ha)
- Built: c. 1830
- Architectural style: Federal, Greek Revival
- NRHP reference No.: 00000026
- VLR No.: 033-0046

Significant dates
- Added to NRHP: January 28, 2000
- Designated VLR: December 1, 1999

Holland–Duncan House is a historic home located near Moneta, in Franklin County, Virginia. It was built about 1830, is a two-story, five-bay, central passage plan, brick dwelling, with a one-story frame ell with side porch. It has a metal gable roof and exterior end chimneys. The interior features Federal and Greek Revival design details. Also on the property are a contributing former post office, mounting block and steps, privy, and cemetery.

It was listed on the National Register of Historic Places in 2000.
