= John H. Kerr =

American politician

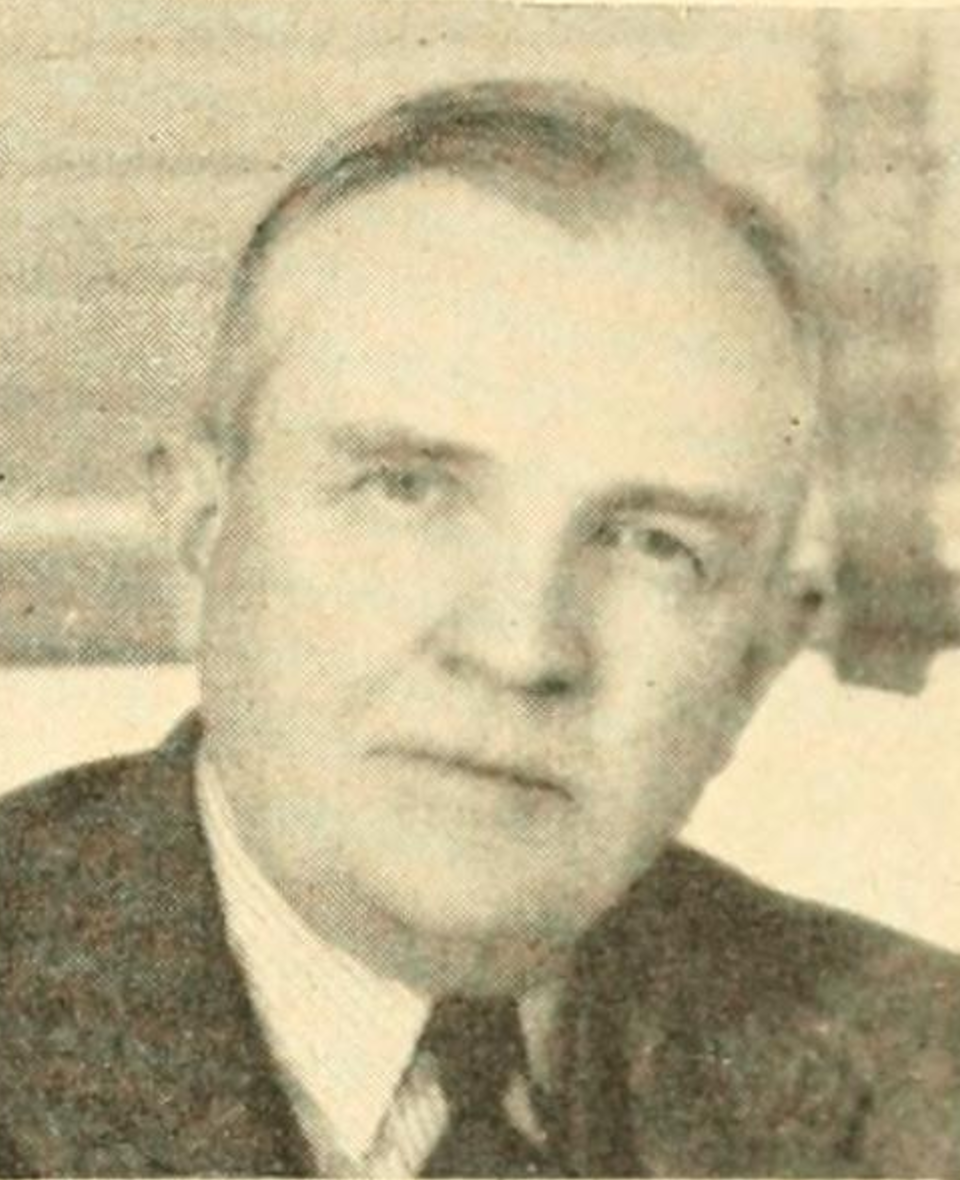

Member of the U.S. House of Representatives from North Carolina's 2nd district
- In office November 6, 1923 – January 3, 1953
- Preceded by: Claude Kitchin
- Succeeded by: L.H. Fountain

Personal details
- Born: John Hosea Kerr; December 31, 1873 Yanceyville, North Carolina
- Died: June 21, 1958 (aged 84) Warrenton, North Carolina
- Party: Democratic
- Education: Wake Forest University School of Law
- Occupation: lawyer

John Hosea Kerr (/kɑːr/; December 31, 1873 – June 21, 1958) was an American jurist and politician who served 15 terms in the U.S. House of Representatives from 1923 to 1953.

== Early life and education ==
Kerr was born in Yanceyville, Caswell County, North Carolina but lived most of his life in Warrenton, North Carolina. Kerr received his bachelor's degree from Wake Forest University and his law degree from Wake Forest University School of Law.

== Career ==
In 1895, Kerr started his law practice in Warrenton, North Carolina. He served as town attorney and then as mayor of Warrenton in 1897 and 1898.

In 1905, Kerr served as solicitor and then from 1916 to 1923, Kerr served as superior court judge.

=== Congress ===
Kerr was originally elected to the United States House of Representatives in a special election to fill the vacancy caused by the death of Claude Kitchin in 1923. He lost a bid for re-election in the 1952 Democratic Party primary to Lawrence H. Fountain largely due to his critiques of New Deal spending, believing that unchecked federal programs would result in economic stagnation.

== Death ==
Kerr died on June 21, 1958 in Warrenton, North Carolina.

=== Legacy ===
Constructed between 1947 and 1953, Kerr Lake, Kerr Lake State Recreation Area, and John H. Kerr Dam is named after him deriving from his instrumental efforts towards the project.

Kerr's son, John H. Kerr, Jr., and grandson, John H. Kerr, III, both served in the North Carolina General Assembly. His great uncle John Kerr also served in the United States House of Representatives.

U.S. House of Representatives
Preceded by Claude Kitchin	Member of the U.S. House of Representatives from North Carolina's 2nd congressional district 1923–1953	Succeeded by L. H. Fountain
