= Smith Mountain Lake Airport =

- IATA: none; ICAO: none; FAA LID: W91

Summary
- Operator: Smith Mountain Lake Airport LLC
- Serves: Smith Mountain Lake
- Location: Moneta, Virginia
- Elevation AMSL: 892 ft / 271.9 m
- Coordinates: 37°08′14.44″N 80°40′42.53″W
- Interactive map of Smith Mountain Lake Airport

Runways
Direction	Length		Surface
Direction	ft	m	Surface
5/23	3,058	932	Asphalt

The Smith Mountain Lake Airport (FAA W91) is a privately owned airport open to the public located 4 miles (6.4 km) southeast of Moneta, in Bedford County, Virginia, USA. The facility serves primarily general aviation for the areas around Smith Mountain Lake. In November 2013, longtime airport owner Joe Borgess sold the airport to a New Jersey couple for approximately one million dollars. Mark A. Dalton, of Mark A. Dalton & Company REALTORS in Lynchburg, VA brokered the sale.
