= Kerr Lake State Recreation Area =

State park in North Carolina, United States

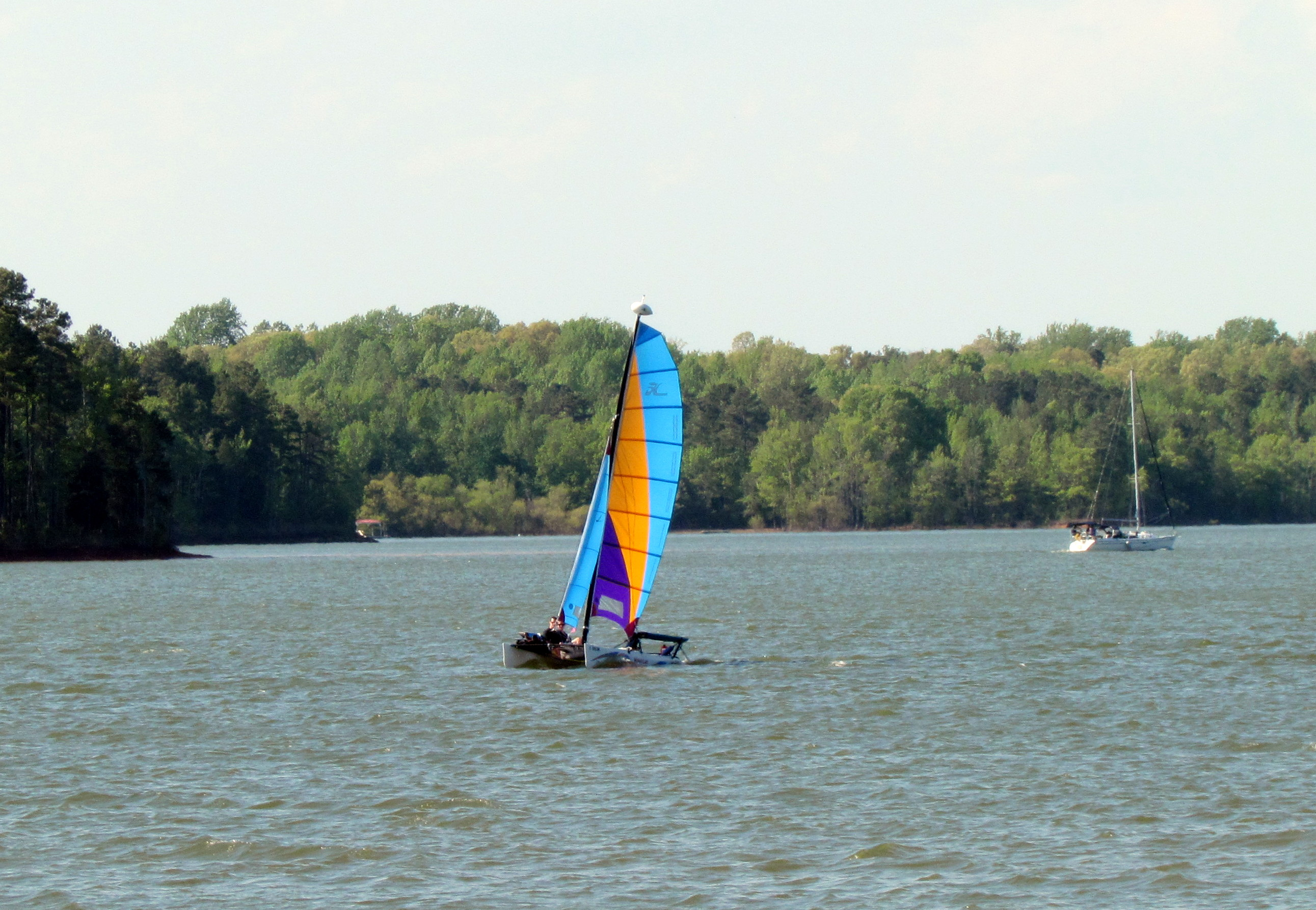
- Sailboat off Satterwhite Point

- Location within North Carolina Location within the United States
- Interactive map of Kerr Lake State Recreation Area
- Location: Vance and Warren counties, North Carolina, United States
- Coordinates: 36°26′28″N 78°22′08″W
- Area: 3,376 acres (1,366 ha)
- Established: 1981
- Administrator: North Carolina Division of Parks and Recreation
- Named for: John H. Kerr
- Website: Official website

Kerr Lake State Recreation Area is a North Carolina state park in Vance and Warren counties, North Carolina, in the United States. Located north of Henderson near the North Carolina-Virginia border, it includes 3,376 acres (13.66 km^{2}) of woodlands along the shores of the 50,000-acre (202 km^{2}) man-made Kerr Lake. The lake, and thus the park, are named for Congressman John H. Kerr, who supported the original lake project.

== See also ==
- John H. Kerr Dam
