= John H. Kerr Dam =

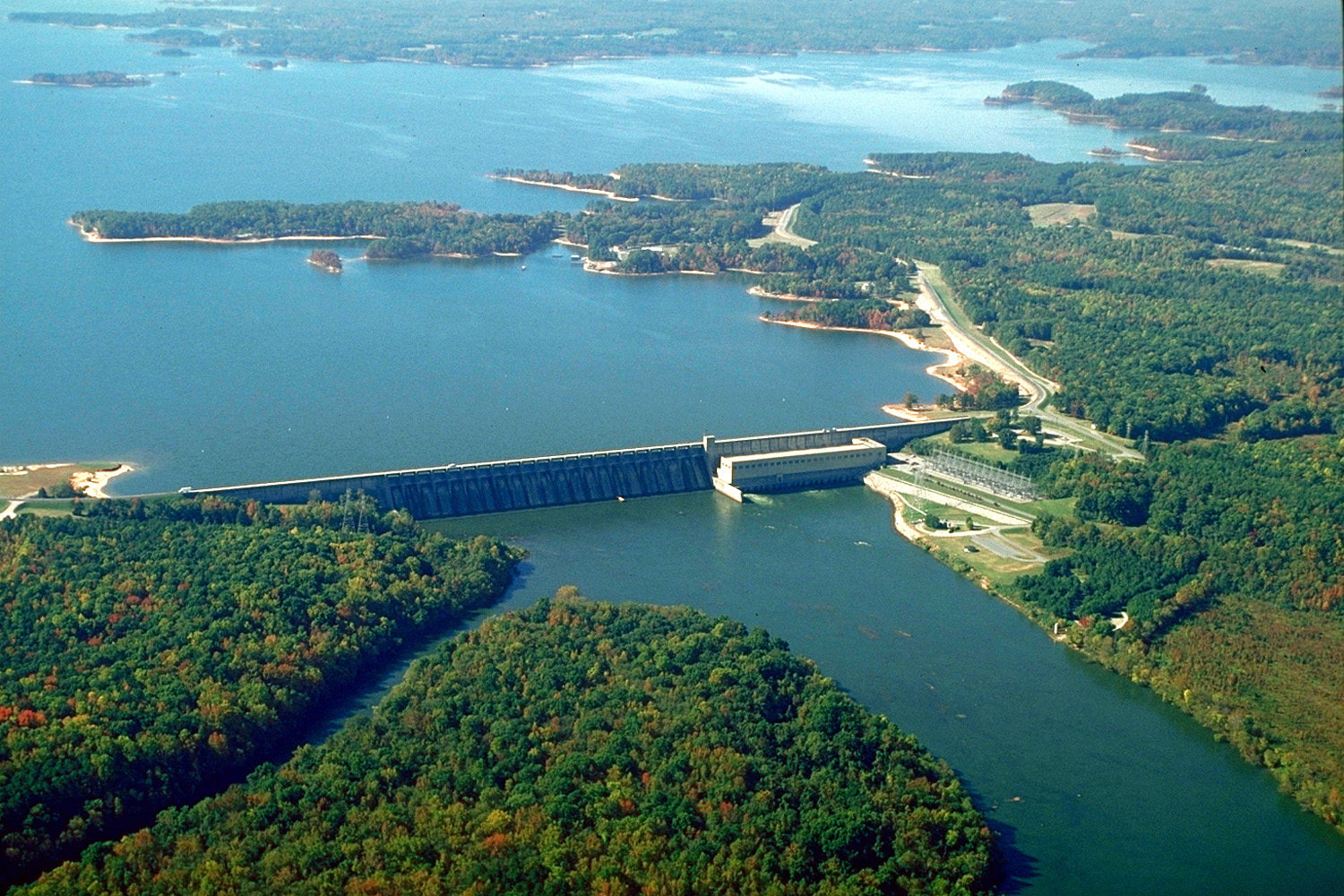
- John H. Kerr Dam
- Interactive map of John H. Kerr Dam
- Location: Mecklenburg County, Virginia, USA
- Coordinates: 36°35′53″N 78°17′55″W
- Construction began: 1947; 79 years ago
- Opening date: 1953; 73 years ago
- Operator: U.S. Army Corps of Engineers

Dam and spillways
- Type of dam: Concrete gravity
- Impounds: Roanoke River
- Height: 144 ft (44 m)
- Length: 2,785 ft (849 m)

Reservoir
- Creates: Kerr Lake
- Surface area: 50,000 acres (20,000 ha)

Power Station
- Turbines: 7 Francis units
- Installed capacity: 227 MW
- Annual generation: 426.749 GWh

John H. Kerr Dam is concrete gravity-dam located on the Roanoke River in Virginia, creating Kerr Lake. The dam was built by the U.S. Army Corps of Engineers between 1947 and 1953 for the purposes of flood control, and hydropower. The dam also serves wildlife resources, forest conservation, and public recreational uses. The John H. Kerr Dam currently produces over 426 GWh of electricity annually and has prevented over $385 million in flood damage since completion. The dam is named after John H. Kerr, a Congressman from North Carolina who was instrumental in authorizing the construction.

== Background and construction ==
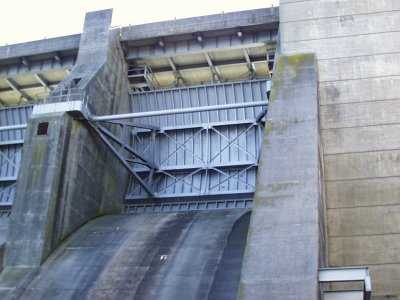
Tainter gate from the back, or spillway, on the John H. Kerr Dam, Boydton, Virginia (USACE)

Construction of the John H. Kerr dam was authorized by the 78th United States Congress in 1944 with the Flood Control Act of 1944 but did not commence until 1947. The site was selected because of the granite in the area that could support a large concrete dam. During early construction, the project was called Buggs Island Lake after a downstream island which was named after Samuel Bugg, an 18th-century early pioneer. The 82nd United States Congress renamed the project the John H. Kerr Dam later in 1951.

The John H. Kerr Dam Project consisted of a dam, powerhouse and switchyard. The dam was built in 53 sections called monoliths. A grouting tunnel or gallery was built in order to fill gaps between the dam and foundation with concrete. The spillway consists of 22-tainter gates for overflow and at the base of the dam, 6-sluice gates were installed to maintain downstream flows. Construction was completed and the dam was opened in 1953.

== Hydro power-plant ==
The hydro-power plant within the John H. Kerr Dam contains 7 vertical Francis units capable of producing 227 MW. Six large generators within the power-plant produce 32 MW each and one smaller unit produces 12 MW. The hydro-power plant operates at about 83% efficiency.

58% of the power sold is transmitted to Dominion Energy and 42% to the Progress Energy. Overall, the power is regulated by the Southeastern Power Administration and about one half of the power is transmitted to various government preference customers such as rural Cooperatives.

== Climate ==
Climate data for John H. Kerr Dam, Virginia
Month	Jan	Feb	Mar	Apr	May	Jun	Jul	Aug	Sep	Oct	Nov	Dec	Year
Record high °F (°C)	80 (27)	83 (28)	90 (32)	94 (34)	99 (37)	107 (42)	106 (41)	108 (42)	103 (39)	102 (39)	90 (32)	81 (27)	108 (42)
Mean maximum °F (°C)	69 (21)	72 (22)	81 (27)	87 (31)	91 (33)	96 (36)	98 (37)	98 (37)	93 (34)	87 (31)	78 (26)	71 (22)	100 (38)
Mean daily maximum °F (°C)	49.7 (9.8)	53.5 (11.9)	61.5 (16.4)	71.6 (22.0)	79.3 (26.3)	87.4 (30.8)	90.9 (32.7)	89.4 (31.9)	83.1 (28.4)	73.3 (22.9)	63.6 (17.6)	52.9 (11.6)	71.4 (21.9)
Mean daily minimum °F (°C)	28.3 (−2.1)	30.3 (−0.9)	36.7 (2.6)	45.9 (7.7)	55.4 (13.0)	64.8 (18.2)	69.3 (20.7)	67.2 (19.6)	60.2 (15.7)	47.6 (8.7)	39.2 (4.0)	31.2 (−0.4)	48.1 (8.9)
Mean minimum °F (°C)	11 (−12)	17 (−8)	21 (−6)	30 (−1)	40 (4)	51 (11)	58 (14)	57 (14)	45 (7)	32 (0)	24 (−4)	16 (−9)	9 (−13)
Record low °F (°C)	−5 (−21)	0 (−18)	7 (−14)	21 (−6)	27 (−3)	37 (3)	47 (8)	44 (7)	33 (1)	19 (−7)	13 (−11)	5 (−15)	−5 (−21)
Average precipitation inches (mm)	3.29 (84)	2.75 (70)	4.20 (107)	3.30 (84)	3.58 (91)	3.53 (90)	5.10 (130)	3.93 (100)	3.47 (88)	3.33 (85)	3.09 (78)	3.24 (82)	42.81 (1,087)
Source: xmACIS2 (Monthly Climate Normals)

== See also ==
- Kerr Lake
- Kerr Lake State Recreation Area
