= Olive Branch Missionary Baptist Church =

Historic church in Virginia, United States

- U.S. National Register of Historic Places
- Virginia Landmarks Register
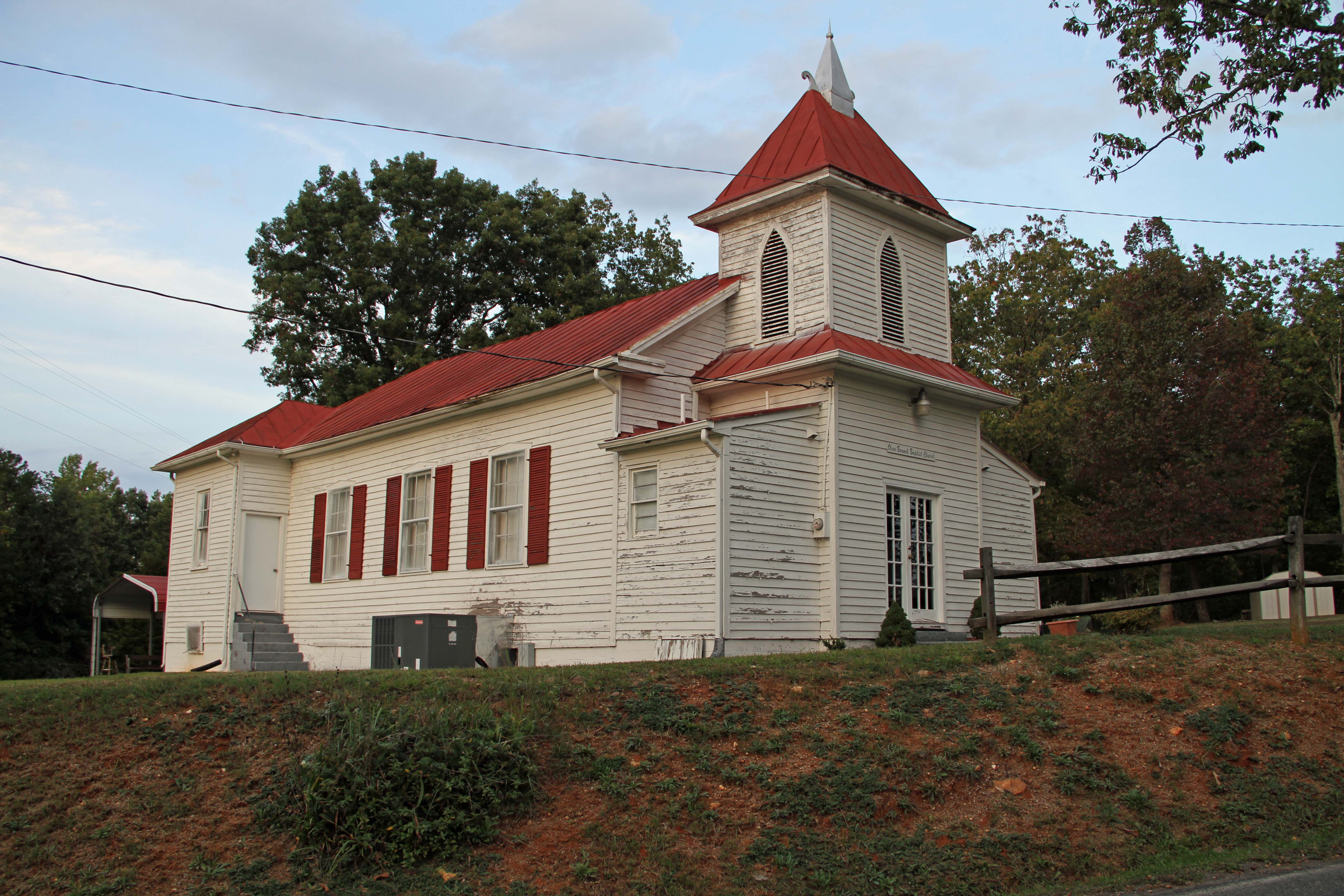
- Church in 2012

- Location within Virginia Location within the United States
- Location: 5982 Joppa Mill Rd., Moneta, Virginia
- Coordinates: 37°14′54″N 79°37′34″W
- Area: 1.2 acres (0.49 ha)
- Built: c. 1896, c. 1920
- Architectural style: Gothic Revival
- NRHP reference No.: 07000392
- VLR No.: 009-0135

Significant dates
- Added to NRHP: May 04, 2007
- Designated VLR: March 7, 2007

Olive Branch Missionary Baptist Church, also known as Olive Branch Baptist Church, is a historic Baptist church located at Moneta, Bedford County, Virginia, United States. The original section was built about 1896, and expanded about 1920. It is a one-story, T-shaped wood-frame building clad in weatherboard siding. It features an original bell tower and Gothic Revival style lancet windows. Adjacent to the church is a contributing cemetery.

It was listed on the National Register of Historic Places in 2007.
