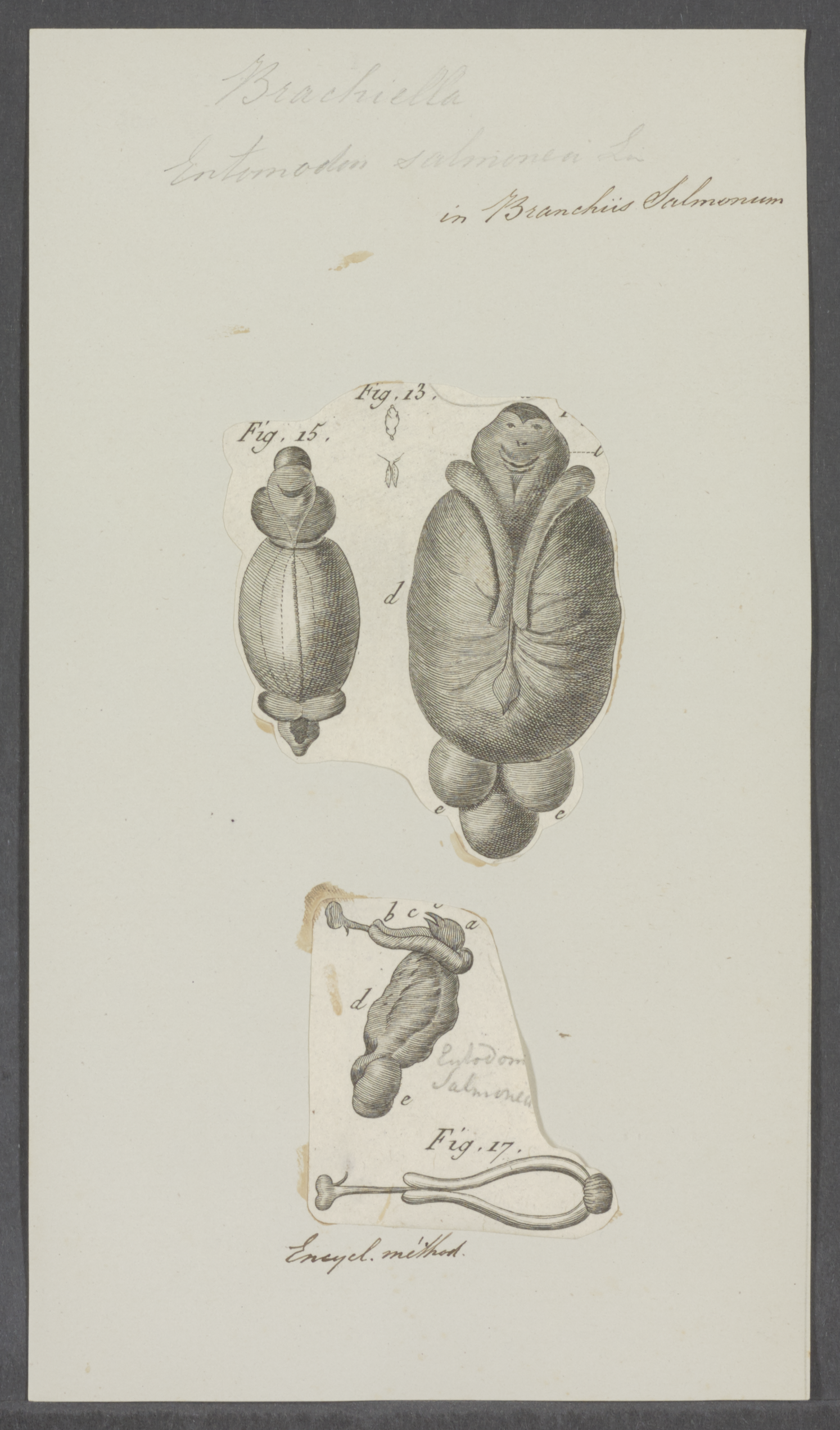
- A picture of Entomodon salmonea

Scientific classification
- Kingdom: Animalia
- Phylum: Arthropoda
- Clade: Pancrustacea
- Class: Copepoda
- Order: Siphonostomatoida
- Family: Lernaeopodidae
- Genus: Salmincola; Wilson, 1915

Synonyms
- Acanthochondria tiddi (Price & Hames, 1968); Entomoda tiddi Price & Hames, 1968; Pediculus Gissler, 1751

= Salmincola =

Genus of crustaceans

Salmincola is a genus of copepods belonging to the family Lernaeopodidae.

The species of this genus are found in Europe and Northern America.

== Species ==
Species:

- Salmincola californiensis (Dana, 1852)
- Salmincola carpionis (Krøyer, 1837)
- Salmincola coregonorum (Kessler, 1868)
- Salmincola corpulentus (Kellicott, 1880)
- Salmincola cottidarum Messjatzeff, 1928
- Salmincola ctensus (Kessler, 1868)
- Salmincola edwardsii (Olsson, 1869)
- Salmincola extensa (Kessler, 1868)
- Salmincola extumescens (Gadd, 1901)
- Salmincola farionis (Linnaeus, 1761)
- Salmincola germani Shedko, 2006
- Salmincola gordoni Gurney, 1933
- Salmincola jacutica Markevich & Bauer, 1950
- Salmincola lavaretus Burdukovskaya & Pronin, 2010
- Salmincola longimanus Gundrizer, 1974
- Salmincola lotae (Olsson, 1877)
- Salmincola markewitschi Shedko & Shedko, 2002
- Salmincola mica Shedko, 2004
- Salmincola nordmanni (Kessler, 1868)
- Salmincola salmonea (Linnaeus, 1758)
- Salmincola siscowet (Smith S.I., 1874)
- Salmincola stellata Markevich, 1936
- Salmincola strigatus (Markevich, 1936)
- Salmincola svetlanovi Burdukovskaya & Pronin, 2010
- Salmincola thymalli (Kessler, 1868)
