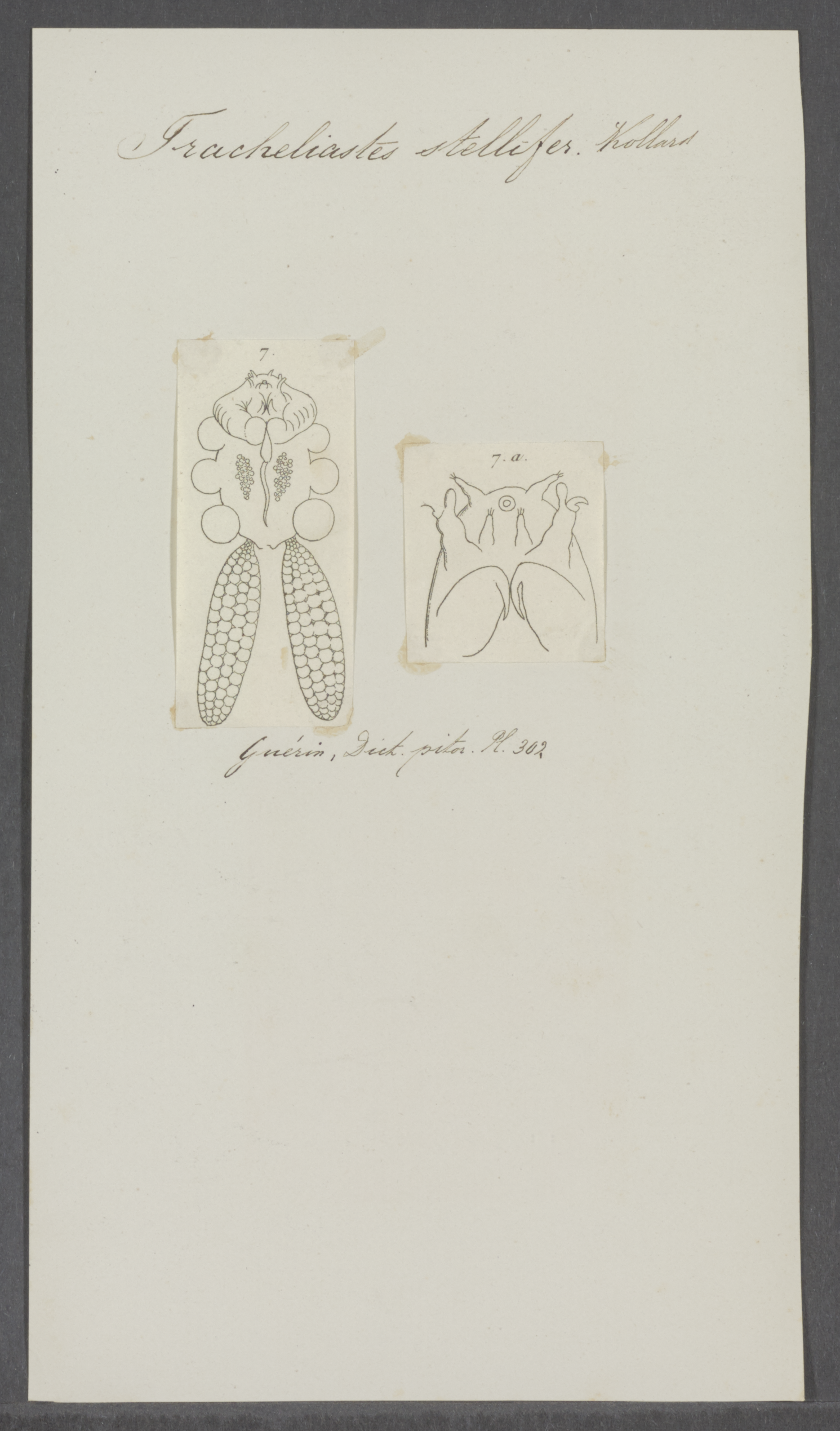
- A picture Tracheliastes stellifer

Scientific classification
- Domain: Eukaryota
- Kingdom: Animalia
- Phylum: Arthropoda
- Class: Copepoda
- Order: Siphonostomatoida
- Family: Lernaeopodidae
- Genus: Tracheliastes; Nordmann, 1832

= Tracheliastes =

Genus of crustaceans

Tracheliastes is a genus of parasitic copepods, containing the following species:

- Tracheliastes brevicorpus Kuang, 1980
- Tracheliastes chondrostomi Hanek, 1969
- Tracheliastes longicollis Markevich, 1940
- Tracheliastes maculatus Kollar, 1835
- Tracheliastes mourkii Hoffman, 1881
- Tracheliastes polycolpus Nordmann, 1832
- Tracheliastes sachalinensis Markevich, 1936
- Tracheliastes tibetanus Kuang, 1964
