= Brights, Virginia =

Unincorporated community in Virginia, US

Coordinates: 37°01′44″N 79°25′56″W

Brights is an unincorporated community in Pittsylvania County, in the U.S. state of Virginia.
