= Smith Mountain Dam =

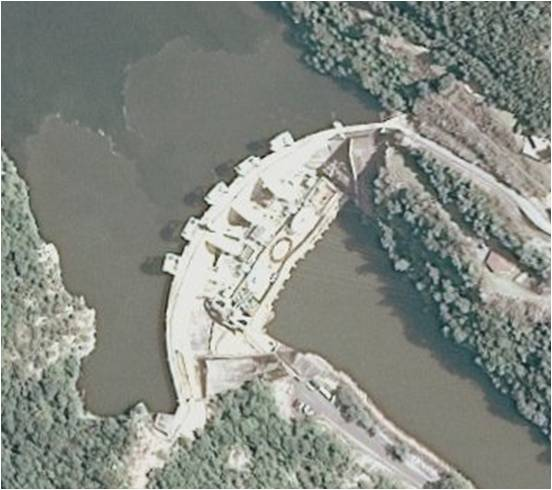
- USGS image of the Smith Mountain Dam
- Location: Bedford / Pittsylvania counties, Virginia, USA
- Coordinates: 37°02′28″N 79°32′08″W
- Construction began: 1960
- Opening date: 1963
- Construction cost: USD $103 million (hydro-power units)
- Operator(s): Appalachian Power (American Electric Power)

Dam and spillways
- Type of dam: Concrete arch
- Impounds: Roanoke River, Blackwater River
- Height: 235 ft (72 m)
- Length: 816 ft (249 m)
- Width (base): 30 ft (9.1 m)

Reservoir
- Creates: Smith Mountain Lake
- Total capacity: 2.8 km^{3} (0.67 cu mi)
- Surface area: 32 sq mi (83 km^{2})

Power Station
- Commission date: 1965-1980
- Turbines: 2 x 70 MW (94,000 hp); 2 x 160 MW (210,000 hp) Francis-type; 1 x 100 MW (130,000 hp) reversible Francis-type
- Installed capacity: 560 MW (750,000 hp)

Smith Mountain Dam is a concrete arch dam located on the Roanoke River in Virginia, creating Smith Mountain Lake. The dam was built by Appalachian Power (a division of American Electric Power) between 1960 and 1963 for the purposes of pumped-storage hydroelectricity. The dam created Smith Mountain Lake as its reservoir, where recreation and real estate have become popular.

== History ==
In the late 1920s, Appalachian Power began purchasing land and planning for a hydroelectricity dam within the Smith Mountain Gorge that is split by the Roanoke River. After several delays and the completion of engineering studies, construction began in 1960. Construction on the smaller Leesville Dam also began downstream at this time as well. Concrete pouring began in 1961 and in 1962, the re-construction of roads and bridges that would be affected by the reservoir was complete.

Filling of the reservoir, Smith Mountain Lake, began on September 24, 1963. In 1964, the first four hydro-electrical generators were installed.

The first commercial saturation dives were performed by Westinghouse to replace faulty trash racks at 200 feet (61 m) on the dam in 1965.

On March 7, 1966, the reservoir was full. In 1979, a fifth hydro-electrical generator was installed, increasing the generation capacity to 560 megawatts (750,000 hp).

== Hydroelectric production ==
Smith Mountain Dam houses five hydroelectric generators with a combined installed capacity of 560 MW. Smith Mountain Lake Dam uses pumped-storage hydroelectricity by which water that is released downstream can be pumped back into Smith Mountain Lake for re-use. The Leesville Dam regulates the Smith Mountain Lake's outflows and stores water to be pumped back into the Smith Mountain Lake for this purpose. Hydro-electricity is usually produced during high-demand times (day) and pumped back into the lake during low demand times (night). The Leesville Dam also produces hydro-electricity as well.

In December 2009, The U.S. Federal Energy Regulatory Commission granted Appalachian Power a new license to operate the hydro-electricity plant. The new 30-year license replaces the original 50-year license and also addresses recreational and environmental management.
