= Achtheres =

Scientific classification
- Kingdom: Animalia
- Phylum: Arthropoda
- Clade: Pancrustacea
- Class: Copepoda
- Order: Siphonostomatoida
- Family: Lernaeopodidae
- Genus: Achtheres; Nordmann, 1832

Genus of crustaceans

Achtheres is a genus of copepods belonging to the family Lernaeopodidae. They are primarily fish parasites.

The genus was first described by Nordmann in 1832.

The species of this genus are primarily found in Europe and Northern America, but have been reported to be seen as far east as Lake Baikal.

Species:

- Achtheres ambloplitis Kellicott, 1880
- Achtheres lacae Krøyer, 1863
- Achtheres microptera Wright, 1882
- Achtheres micropteri Wright, 1882
- Achtheres percarum Nordmann, 1832
- Achtheres pimelodi Krøyer, 1863
