= Alella (crustacean) =

Scientific classification
- Domain: Eukaryota
- Kingdom: Animalia
- Phylum: Arthropoda
- Class: Copepoda
- Order: Siphonostomatoida
- Family: Lernaeopodidae
- Genus: Alella; Leigh-Sharpe, 1925

Species
- Alella pagelli (Krøyer, 1863) – type species

Genus of crustaceans

Alella is a monotypic genus of copepods belonging to the family Lernaeopodidae. The only species, Alella pagelli, is found in Australia.
