= Lake Gaston =

Hydroelectric reservoir in the eastern United States

- Main lake view from the mouth of Hamlin Creek

- Location within North Carolina Location within Virginia Location within the United States
- Location: North Carolina–Virginia border, United States
- Coordinates: 36°30′35″N 77°52′51″W
- Type: Reservoir
- Basin countries: United States
- Max. length: 34 mi (55 km)
- Max. width: 1.3 mi (2.1 km)
- Surface area: 20,000 acres (81 km^{2})
- Average depth: 40 ft (12 m)
- Max. depth: 95 ft (29 m)
- Shore length^{1}: 350 mi (560 km)
- Surface elevation: 200 ft (61 m)
- Islands: Wobble Island, Stagger Island, Goat Island
- Settlements: Littleton (NC), Henrico (NC), Macon (NC) Gasburg (VA), Bracey (VA)
- ^{1} Shore length is not a well-defined measure.

Lake Gaston is a reservoir in the eastern United States. Part of the lake is in the North Carolina counties of Halifax, Northampton, and Warren. The part extending into Virginia lies in Brunswick and Mecklenburg counties. Lake Gaston is roughly 35 miles (56 km) long and covers over 20,000 acres (81 km^{2}), with 350 miles (560 km) of shoreline.

The area surrounding the lake is home to more than 150,000 residents. The nearest towns are Littleton and Roanoke Rapids in North Carolina, and Clarksville and South Hill in Virginia.

The lake is not federally owned. It was formed in 1963 when the Virginia Electric Power Company (VEPCO) built Gaston Dam on the Roanoke River to generate hydroelectric power for Dominion Resources, which owns the lake. The dam is located on the North Carolina side and generates electricity for Dominion North Carolina Power, which is the North Carolina operating company of Dominion Resources. The dam includes four hydroelectric generators, with a total generating capacity of 224 megawatts.

Lake Gaston is fed by water from Kerr Lake upstream and supplies water to Roanoke Rapids Lake downstream, a smaller predecessor to Lake Gaston. This is one of the few areas in the country with three hydroelectric dams in close proximity to one another.

Lake Gaston has long been famous for fishing and other water recreations. The lake is a favorite vacation spot because it is close to the Research Triangle region of North Carolina, I-85, and I-95. Lake Gaston, built for flood control, hydroelectric power, and recreational enjoyment, includes such activities as fishing, boating, swimming, water skiing, and wakeboarding.

== Lake level and water management ==
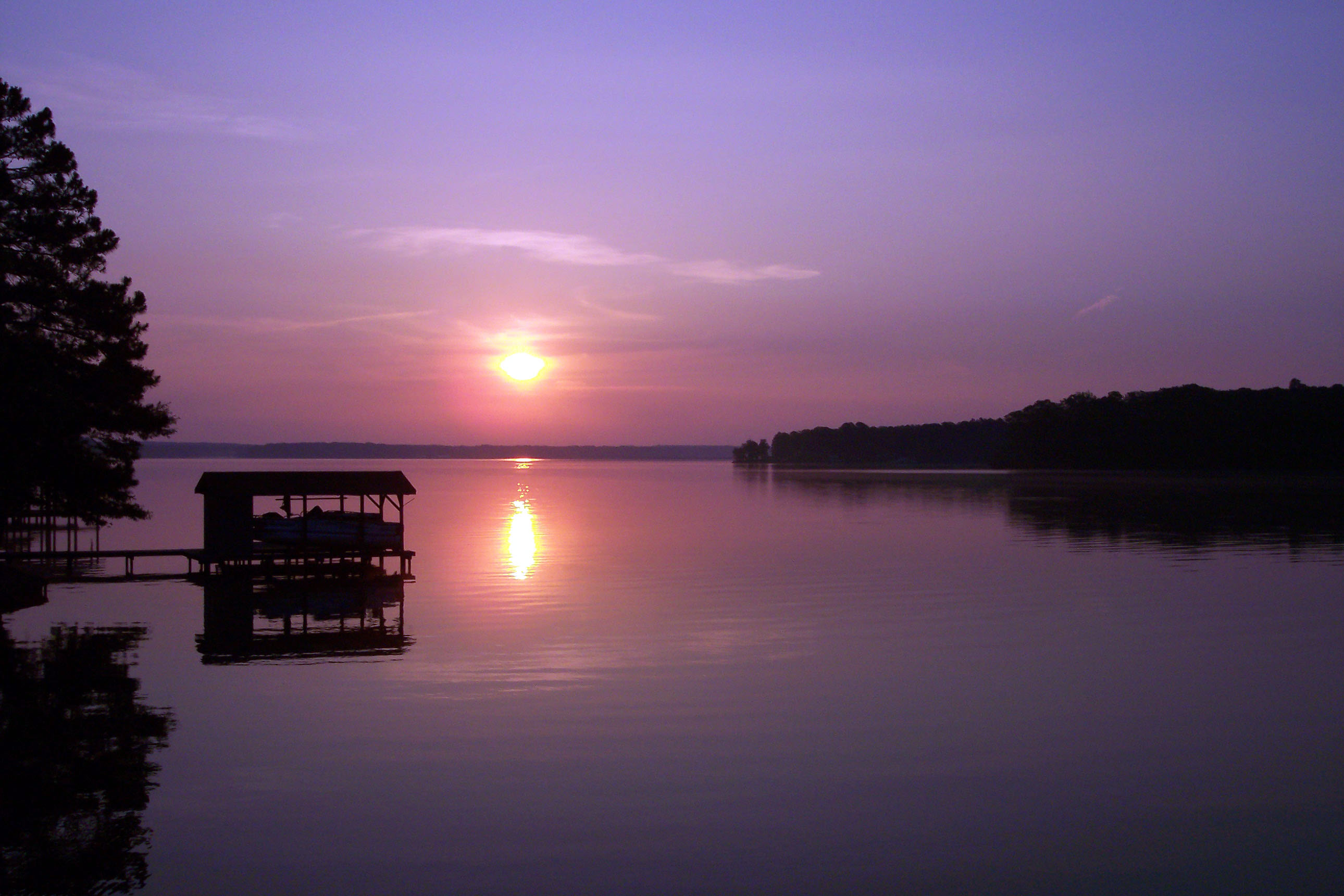
Sunrise over Lake Gaston

Lake Gaston differs from many other lakes in that the water levels are strictly regulated through a license with the Federal Energy Regulatory Commission (FERC). The license also requires cooperation with the U.S. Army Corps of Engineers, which manages the upstream feeder lake, Kerr Lake. There are 4 defined operating conditions for Lake Gaston:

- Normal: 199–200 feet (60.7–61.0 m) of elevation
- Fish Spawning: 199–201 feet (60.7–61.3 m) of elevation
- Flood Control: up to 203 feet (61.9 m) of elevation (204 feet [62.2 m] possible in a 100-year flood event)
- Drought: No lower than 197 feet (60.0 m) feet of elevation

As a result of controlled lake levels, fixed docks and boathouses are normal on Lake Gaston.

== Lakeside residences ==
=== Community association ===
The Lake Gaston Association (LGA) is a citizens' organization that actively advocates and promotes the interests of households and businesses who own property in the two states and five counties encompassing Lake Gaston. Each of the five counties surrounding Lake Gaston has four volunteer Director positions on the LGA Board, plus one at-large position, for a total of 25 Directors. It is a volunteer, non-profit, nonpartisan, and nonsectarian organization, unified for more significant influence with federal, state, local officials, and agencies that have management authority on and around Lake Gaston.

=== Real estate ===
Lake Gaston covers an extended geographical area and is bordered by several towns. Real estate is generally broken up via quadrant, and realtors will use the terms "South-East", "South-West", "North-East", and "North-West" when discussing general location of a property on the lake.

=== Waterfront construction authority ===
Generally speaking, no individual owns waterfront property on Lake Gaston. Dominion Power owns the lake and lands up to the "High Water Mark." Real estate, listed with an indicator, tells the buyer how many linear feet of property they would potentially own that abuts to the High Water Mark. This number used to be referred to as the "HWM" on real estate listings, and is now referred to as "DOM". However, Dominion Power does allow for construction of boathouses and other permitted structures through an approval process.

== Recreation ==
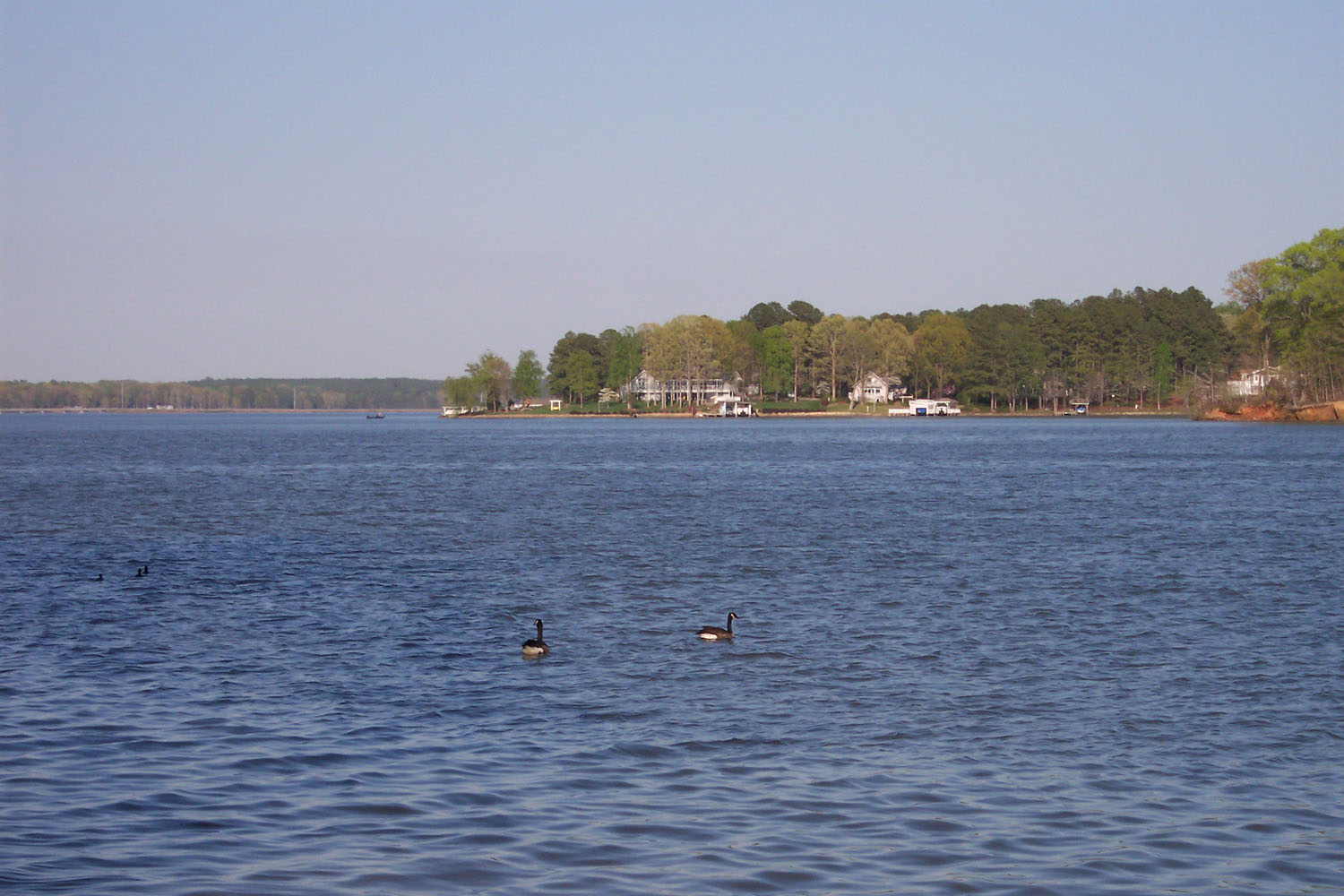
Lake Gaston from Old Bridge Point on Hubquarter Creek

=== Major on-water marinas ===
By quad:

- South-West/Central
  - Eaton Ferry Marina (Keel Marinas), Littleton, NC
- South-East
  - Stonehouse Timber Lodge, Littleton, NC
  - Thousand Trails RV Campground, Littleton, NC
- North-West
  - Holly Grove Marina, Bracey, VA
  - Americamps, Bracey VA
  - Poplar Point Marine, Bracey, VA
- North-East
  - Washburn's Marina, Henrico, NC
  - Lake Gaston Resort, Gasburg, VA

=== Marine supply and boat dealers ===
*Overby Marine, Littleton, NC *Northampton Marine, Henrico, NC *Poplar Point Marine, Bracey, VA *Fred's Boats Sales and Service, Littleton, NC

=== Boating regulations ===
The North Carolina part of the lake is controlled by the Wildlife Resources Commission. The Virginia side is regulated by the Department of Game and Inland Fisheries.

==== Fishing and fishing regulations ====
Lake Gaston has been well stocked with game fish which include large mouth bass, crappie, sunfish, striped bass / rock fish, and a variety of catfish species. You can also find other species of fish such as white perch, yellow perch, chain pickerel, and sometimes walleye. Walleye are stocked by the Virginia Department of Wildlife Resources annually, and striped bass are managed by the North Carolina Wildlife Resources Commission through stocking. Lake Gaston is a popular spot for fishing tournaments which can be found throughout the season.

A Virginia state record saugeye (Sander canadensis × vitreus) was caught in Lake Gaston on a crankbait lure on May 29, 2023, weighing 6 pounds 8 ounces (2.9 kg). An 8-pound (3.6 kg) chain pickerel caught on minnow bait on February 13, 1968 set a North Carolina state record for that species.

A valid fishing license from either North Carolina or Virginia is required for fishing on Lake Gaston but is not required for those under the age of 15. Virginia and North Carolina have a reciprocal license agreement for Lake Gaston, which means that hook-and-line fishing licenses purchased from either North Carolina or Virginia are honored in Lake Gaston. Note: North Carolina fishing regulations apply on North Carolina portions of these waters. Virginia fishing regulations apply in Virginia waters.

== Local media ==
"Lake the Magazine" is a reflection of life on Lake Gaston and Roanoke Rapids Lake. It is published monthly, connecting people through inspiring, entertaining, and informative content. The distribution includes households in the lake country that subscribe to The Daily Herald, and complimentary copies are available at high profile locations throughout Halifax and Northampton counties.

"The Lake Gaston Gazette-Observer," founded in 1955, is owned by Womack Publishing Company, a family-owned community newspaper business based in Chatham, Va. It is published each Wednesday. Other publications include Lake Life magazine, a full-color glossy magazine, published seasonally. The community newspaper has 17,500 readers each week, covers Mecklenburg and Brunswick counties in Virginia and Warren, Northampton, and Halifax counties in North Carolina, including the towns of Littleton and Warrenton in North Carolina and Gasburg and Bracey in Virginia as well as the communities of Henrico, and Ebony.

The "Lake Gaston Guide" is a webpage sharing news, weather, fishing, boating/camping, events & entertainment, real estate, maps, and directory information for residents of and visitors to the Lake Gaston Area.

== Pipeline ==
After many years of court battles, a 70-mile (110 km) pipeline was established from Lake Gaston to Virginia Beach to provide water to that coastal community in Virginia.
