= Roanoke River =

River in Virginia and North Carolina, United States

Roanoke River Staunton River
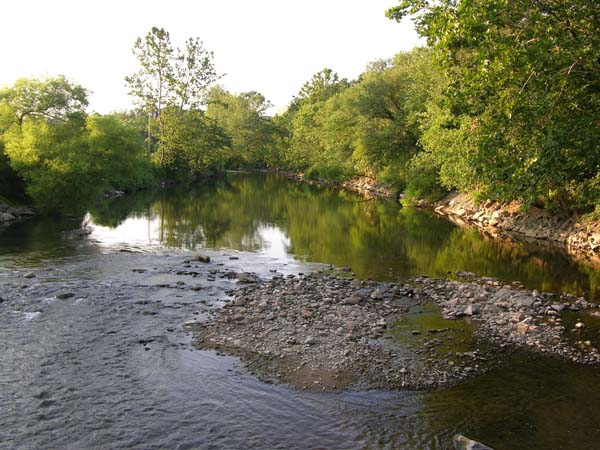
- Roanoke River in the Wasena neighborhood of Roanoke, Virginia

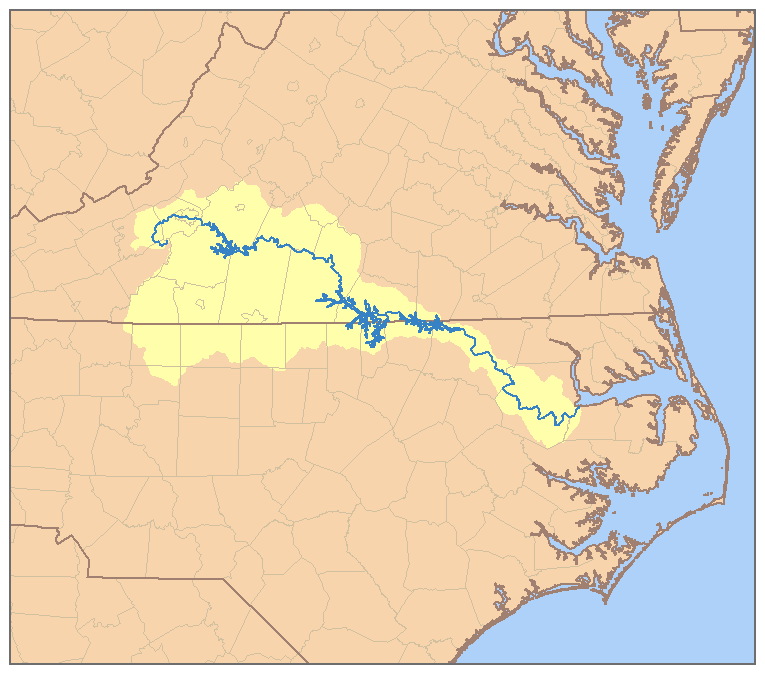
- Map of the Roanoke River watershed

Location
- Country: United States
- State: Virginia, North Carolina

Physical characteristics
- Source: Confluence of North and South Forks
  - location: Lafayette, Virginia
  - coordinates: 37°14′15″N 80°12′49″W
  - elevation: 1,194 ft (364 m)
- Mouth: Albemarle Sound
  - location: Plymouth, North Carolina
  - coordinates: 35°56′33″N 76°41′42″W
  - elevation: 0 ft (0 m)
- Length: 410 mi (660 km)
- Basin size: 9,680 sq mi (25,100 km^{2})
- Discharge
  - location: Roanoke Rapids, 133.6 mi (215.0 km) from the mouth
  - average: 7,802 cu ft/s (220.9 m^{3}/s)
  - minimum: 818 cu ft/s (23.2 m^{3}/s)
  - maximum: 261,000 cu ft/s (7,400 m^{3}/s)

Basin features
- Progression: Albemarle Sound
- Tributaries
  - left: Big Otter River, Falling River
  - right: Dan River

The Roanoke River (/ˈroʊ.əˌnoʊk/ ROH-ə-nohk) runs 410 miles (660 km) long through southern Virginia and northeastern North Carolina in the United States. A major river of the southeastern United States, it drains a largely rural area of the coastal plain from the eastern edge of the Appalachian Mountains southeast across the Piedmont to Albemarle Sound. An important river throughout the history of the United States, it was the site of early settlement in the Virginia Colony and the Carolina Colony. An 81-mile (130 km) section of its lower course in Virginia between the Leesville Lake and Kerr Lake is known as the Staunton River, pronounced /ˈstæntən/, as is the Shenandoah Valley city of that name. It is impounded along much of its middle course to form a chain of reservoirs.

Staunton River is also the name of the northern political district of Pittsylvania County, Virginia, where a large section of the river serves as the boundary between Campbell County, Virginia (to the north), Halifax County, Virginia (to the south east) and Pittsylvania County (to the south west).

The Roanoke River State Trail is a paddle trail which follows the lower portion of the river, from Roanoke Rapids to the Albemarle Sound.

== Description ==
The river has its headwaters in the Blue Ridge Mountains in southwestern Virginia at Lafayette in Montgomery County where the North Fork and South Fork of the river merge. The North Fork, approximately 30 miles (48 km) long, rises between two mountain ridges and flows initially southwest, then loops back to the northeast. The South Fork, approximately 20 miles (32 km) long, rises in several streams in the mountains on the border of Floyd, Roanoke, and Montgomery counties and flows generally north, joining the North Fork from the south.

The combined stream flows northeast between mountain ridges through the Roanoke Valley, approximately 10 miles (16 km) to Salem, then east through the city of Roanoke, emerging from a gorge in the Blue Ridge Mountains southeast of Roanoke and forming the boundary between Franklin and Bedford counties. The river flows generally east-southeast across the Piedmont of southern Virginia and enters northeastern North Carolina, passing north of Roanoke Rapids at the fall line. The river flows southeast in a zigzag course across the coastal plain through the Roanoke River National Wildlife Refuge and then briefly turns north as it enters Batchelor Bay on the western end of Albemarle Sound. The Roanoke River is also known as the Staunton River for 80 miles between Smith Mountain Lake and convergence with the Dan River at Kerr Lake.

The river is impounded in six locations. The first is the Niagara Dam just south of the City of Roanoke in Roanoke County adjacent to the town of Vinton. It was constructed in 1906 to supply power for the Roanoke Electric Car streetcar system, and is currently owned and operated by Appalachian Power. It is then impounded twice in succession in the Piedmont of southwestern Virginia downstream from Roanoke to form the Smith Mountain Lake and Leesville Lake reservoirs. Farther downstream in southern along the North Carolina border, the river is impounded by the John H. Kerr Dam to form the expansive Kerr Lake. In northeastern North Carolina, three miles (4.8 km) west of Roanoke Rapids, the river is impounded to form the Lake Gaston reservoir, and is impounded a final time to form Roanoke Rapids Lake.

== History ==
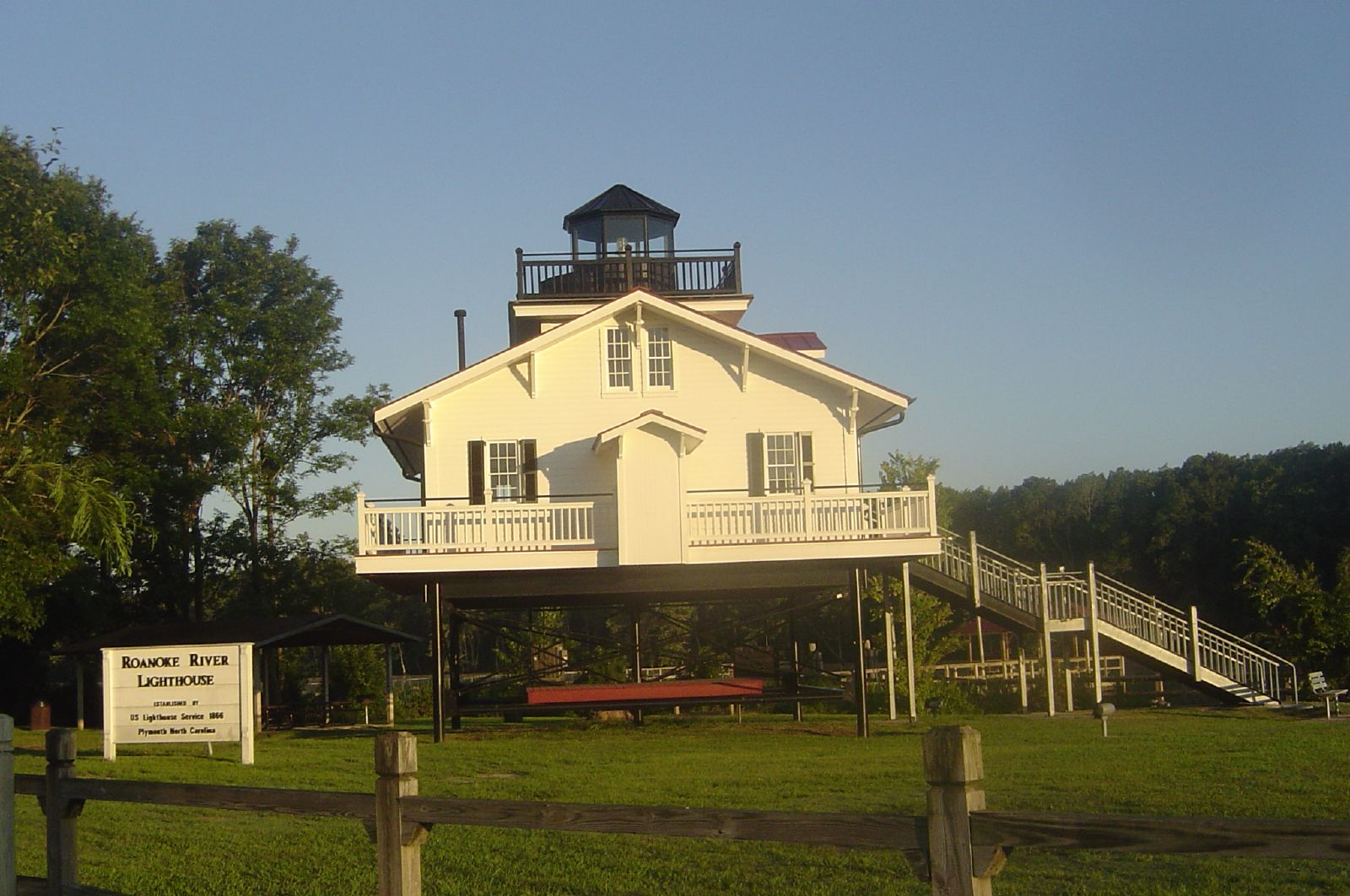
Replica of the Roanoke River Lighthouse, built at Plymouth, North Carolina

The Roanoke River valley was the homeland of various Native Americans, such as the Moratoc, Occaneechi, Tuscarora and the Tutelo. The deadly spring floods earned it the name "River of Death". The river's lower course began to be settled by Virginians about the middle of the 17th century, in what was known as the Albemarle Settlements. The upper reaches of the Roanoke River were explored by fur trading parties sent by Abraham Wood in the late 17th century, but these were not settled by English until the early 18th century.

In 1883, the small town of Big Lick on the river was selected as a major shops and terminal point for the new Norfolk and Western Railway to meet the Shenandoah Valley Railroad. Big Lick was renamed Roanoke for the river that bisected it, as the surrounding Roanoke County had been in 1838.

The Roanoke River was prone to serious flooding prior to the completion of the John H. Kerr Dam in 1953. Construction of the dam was precipitated by the 1940 South Carolina hurricane, which caused record flooding in the Roanoke River basin and led to calls for better flood control mechanisms.

In 1997, the non-profit Roanoke River Partners formed to create a paddle trail along the river in North Carolina. The group established a system of river accesses and camping platforms between Roanoke Rapids and the Albemarle Sound, known as the Roanoke River Paddle Trail.

On November 18, 2021, the North Carolina General Assembly passed a law adding the Roanoke River Paddle Trail as its twelfth State Trail.

== See also ==
- List of North Carolina rivers
- List of Virginia rivers
- South Atlantic-Gulf Water Resource Region
