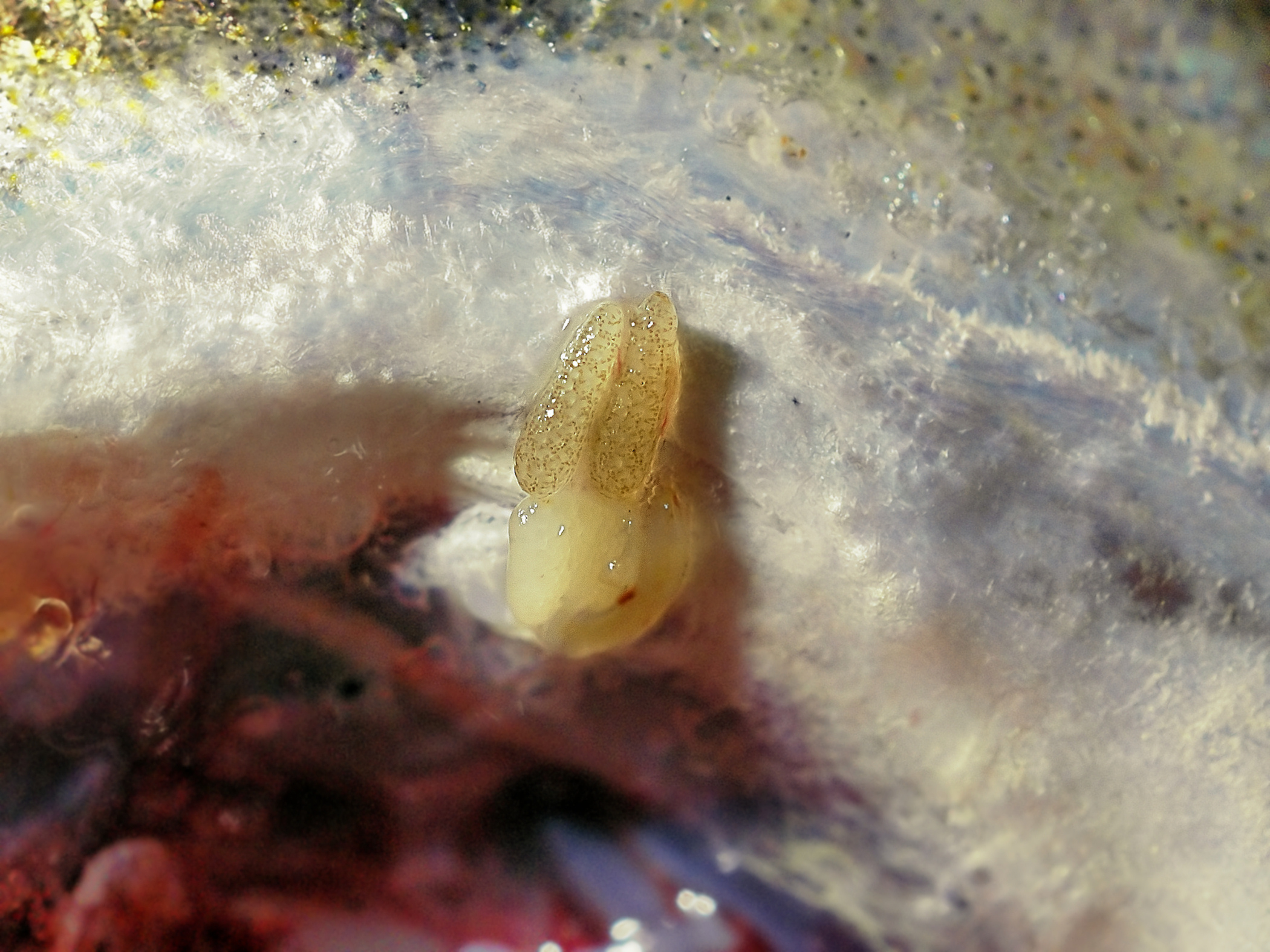
- Clavella adunca parasitizing whiting (Merlangius merlangus)

Scientific classification
- Kingdom: Animalia
- Phylum: Arthropoda
- Clade: Pancrustacea
- Class: Copepoda
- Order: Siphonostomatoida
- Family: Lernaeopodidae; H. Milne-Edwards, 1840

Genera
- 50 genera (see text)

= Lernaeopodidae =

Family of crustaceans

Lernaeopodidae is a family of parasitic copepods. The females are typically large and fleshy, and attach to the host permanently using a plug made of chitin called the bulla. The males cling on to the females using their antennae. They parasitize both marine and freshwater fish. Some lernaeopodids, including Clavella and Salmincola, can have negative impacts on fish in aquaculture.

== Genera ==
The family contains the following genera:

- Acespadia Leigh-Sharpe, 1933
- Achtheres Nordmann, 1832
- Alella Leigh-Sharpe, 1925
- Anaclavella Heegaard, 1940
- Basanistes Nordmann, 1832
- Brachiella Cuvier, 1830
- Brianella Wilson C.B., 1915
- Brianellinae Wilson C.B., 1915
- Cauloxenus Cope, 1872
- Charopinus Krøyer, 1863
- Clavella Oken, 1815
- Clavellinae Wilson C.B., 1915
- Clavellisa Wilson C.B., 1915
- Clavellistes Shiino, 1963
- Clavellodes Wilson C.B., 1915
- Clavellomimus Kabata, 1969
- Clavellopsis Wilson C.B., 1915
- Clavellotis Castro-Romero & Baeza-Kuroki, 1984
- Coregonicola Markevich, 1936
- Cryptova Kabata, 1992
- Dendrapta Kabata, 1964
- Eubrachiella Wilson C.B., 1915
- Euclavellisa Heegaard, 1940
- Kabatahoia Kazachenko, 2001
- Kabatazus Özdikmen, 2008
- Lernaeopoda Blainville, 1822
- Lernaeopodina Wilson C.B., 1915
- Lernaeopodinae Wilson C.B., 1915
- Margolisius Benz, Kabata & Bullard, 2000
- Mixtio Kabata, 1986
- Naobranchia Hesse, 1863
- Nectobrachia Fraser, 1920
- Neoalbionella Özdikmen, 2008
- Nudiclavella Ho, 1975
- Ommatokoita Leigh-Sharpe, 1926
- Parabrachiella Wilson C.B., 1915
- Proclavellodes Kabata, 1967
- Pseudocharopinoides Castro-Romero & Baeza-Kuroki, 1987
- Pseudocharopinus Kabata, 1964
- Pseudolernaeopoda Castro-Romero & Baeza-Kuroki, 1986
- Pseudolernaeopodina Hogans, 1988
- Pseudomixtio Kabata, 1990
- Pseudotracheliastes Markevich, 1956
- Salmincola Wilson C.B., 1915
- Schistobrachia Kabata, 1964
- Sparidicola Kabata & Tareen, 1987
- Thysanote Krøyer, 1863
- Tracheliastes Nordmann, 1832
- Tracheliastinae Wilson C.B., 1915
- Vanbenedenia Malm, 1861
