= Kerr Lake =

Reservoir along the Virginia–North Carolina border, United States

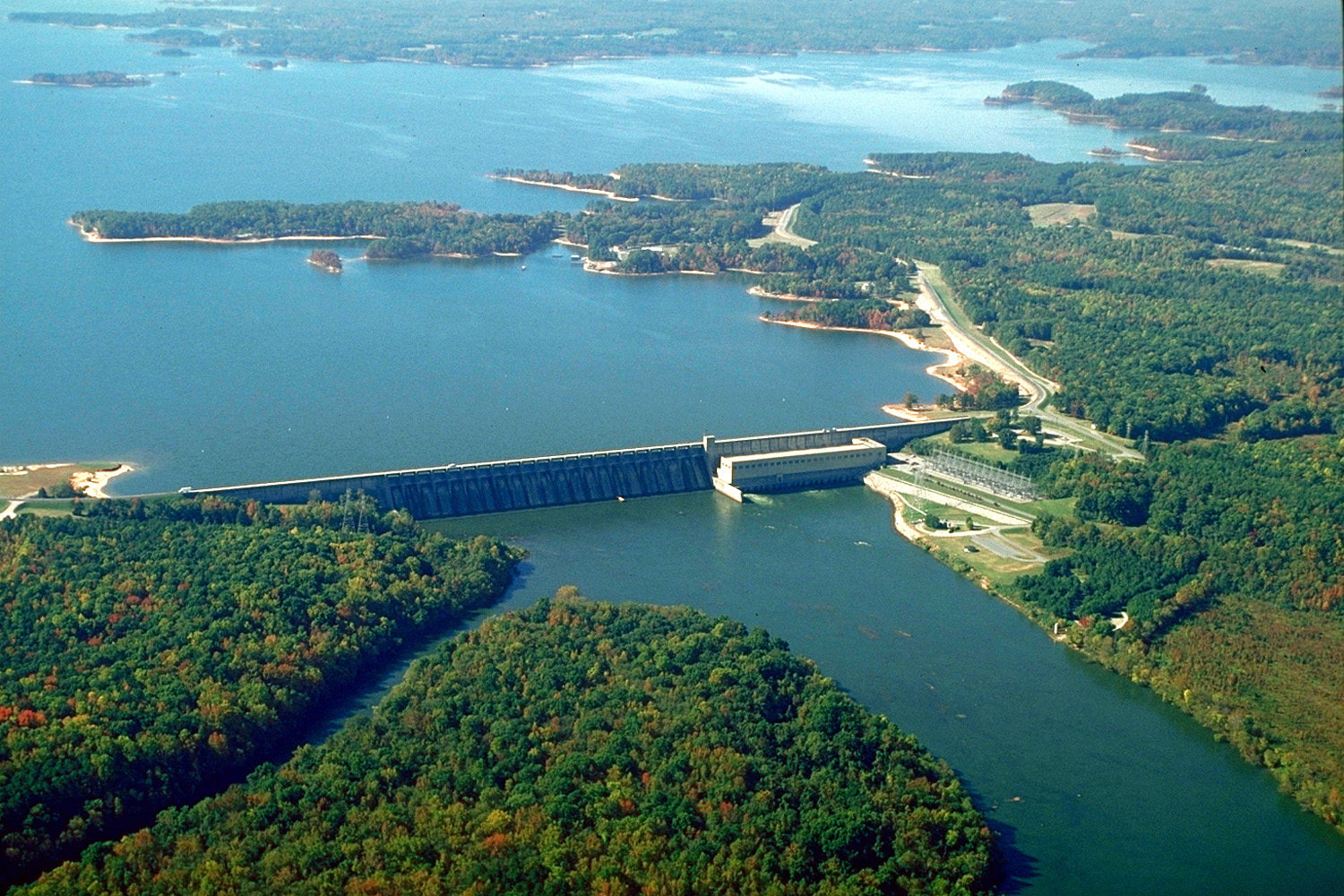
- John H. Kerr Dam and Lake in Mecklenburg County, Virginia

- Location within North Carolina Location within Virginia Location within the United States
- Location: North Carolina–Virginia border, United States
- Coordinates: 36°34′16.13″N 78°19′33.59″W
- Type: Reservoir
- Primary inflows: Roanoke River, Dan River
- Primary outflows: Roanoke River
- Basin countries: United States
- Surface area: 50,000 acres (200 km^{2})
- Average depth: 30 ft (9.1 m)
- Max. depth: 100 ft (30 m) (at John H. Kerr Dam)
- Surface elevation: 300 ft (91 m) (dead storage); 310 ft (94 m) (power storage); 320 ft (98 m) (flood storage)

The John H. Kerr Reservoir (often called Kerr Lake in North Carolina and Bugg's Island Lake in Virginia) is a reservoir along the border of the U.S. states of North Carolina and Virginia. The U.S. Army Corps of Engineers constructed the John H. Kerr Dam across the Roanoke River between 1947 and 1952 to produce hydroelectricity as well as for flood control. Kerr Lake is the largest lake in Virginia, with 850 miles (1,370 km) of shoreline located in Vance, Granville, and Warren counties in North Carolina, as well as Mecklenburg, Charlotte, and Halifax counties in Virginia. At its maximum capacity, it covers approximately 50,000 acres (200 km^{2}) and is one of the largest reservoirs in the Southeastern United States. The name honors its Congressional sponsor, John H. Kerr, a North Carolina Democrat who supported creation of the lake. The lake supports recreational tourism in North Carolina and Virginia as described below.

== Geography and history ==
The US Army Corp of engineers operates the hydroelectric plant using this dam on the Roanoke River aka Staunton River. The Dan River and several smaller creeks also feed the lake. The impounded area downstream from Bugg Lake is known as Lake Gaston. Buggs Island, named for Samuel Bugg, an early settler, is just downstream from the John H. Kerr Dam, and visible from the viewing platform below the dam at Tailrace Park.

One of Virginia's original state parks, Staunton River State Park constructed by the Civilian Conservation Corps during the New Deal, was partially covered by the reservoir, but still exists. The Commonwealth of Virginia later leased land from the U.S. Army Corps of Engineers to construct Occoneechee State Park, which honors the Occoneechee indigenous people who lived on another island (now submerged) in the river, but who were nearly exterminated in May 1676 during Bacon's Rebellion. Survivors returned to the area by 1714, seeking refuge and support at the newly created Fort Christanna in then-vast Brunswick County, Virginia. North Carolina now recognizes the tribe as a subgroup of the Sappony people, although initially distinct, but also speaking a Siouan language. Virginia may include the tribe with the Saponi and Tutelo further upstream as part of the Monacan Indian Nation, a tribe which originally lived to the northwest along the James River, and many of whose members emigrated northward and/or westward to join other Iroquian people.

== Amenities ==
The only lake in Virginia to have a naturally reproducing population of striped bass, anglers also fish for large-mouth bass, crappie, catfish and bluegills. Camping is also popular, with various campgrounds operated by the Army Corps of Engineers, North Carolina State Parks and the Virginia Department of Conservation and Recreation. North Carolina operates the Kerr Lake State Recreation Area with campgrounds including Kimball Point, Satterwhite Point, Bullocksville, North Bend Park, County Line, Hibernia, and others. Campsites range from primitive (for tents), to yurts, cabins, and some campgrounds feature equestrian (with stables) and RVs electric and water hookups. In addition to motorboating and sailing, jet-skiing and water-tubing occur often on the lake. The four privately operated marinas are Steele Creek and Satterwhite Point in North Carolina, along with Clarksville, and Rudds Creek in Virginia. These marinas have rental slips for sail and motor boats, with additional amenities including fuel docks, marina stores, and some organized yacht clubs. The Carolina Sailing Club stages monthly regattas for several one-design sailing classes from April through October.

The Virginia state record blue catfish, which weighed 143 pounds (65 kg), was caught at Buggs Island Lake on June 18, 2011 by angler Richard Nicholas "Nick" Anderson. It is also the International Game Fish Association 50-pound (23 kg) test and all-tackle world record. Additionally, the Virginia state record freshwater drum was caught here in Virginia waters on March 26, 2018, weighing 29 pounds 6 ounces (13.3 kg). The North Carolina state record freshwater drum was caught in Kerr Reservoir on March 20, 2013 on a plastic fluke lure. It weighed 23 pounds 8 ounces (10.7 kg). The North Carolina state record white bass was also caught here in North Carolina waters on March 15, 1986 on a bucktail lure. It weighed 5 pounds 14 ounces (2.7 kg).

== See also ==
- Kerr Lake State Recreation Area
