= Smith Mountain Lake =

Reservoir in Virginia, United States

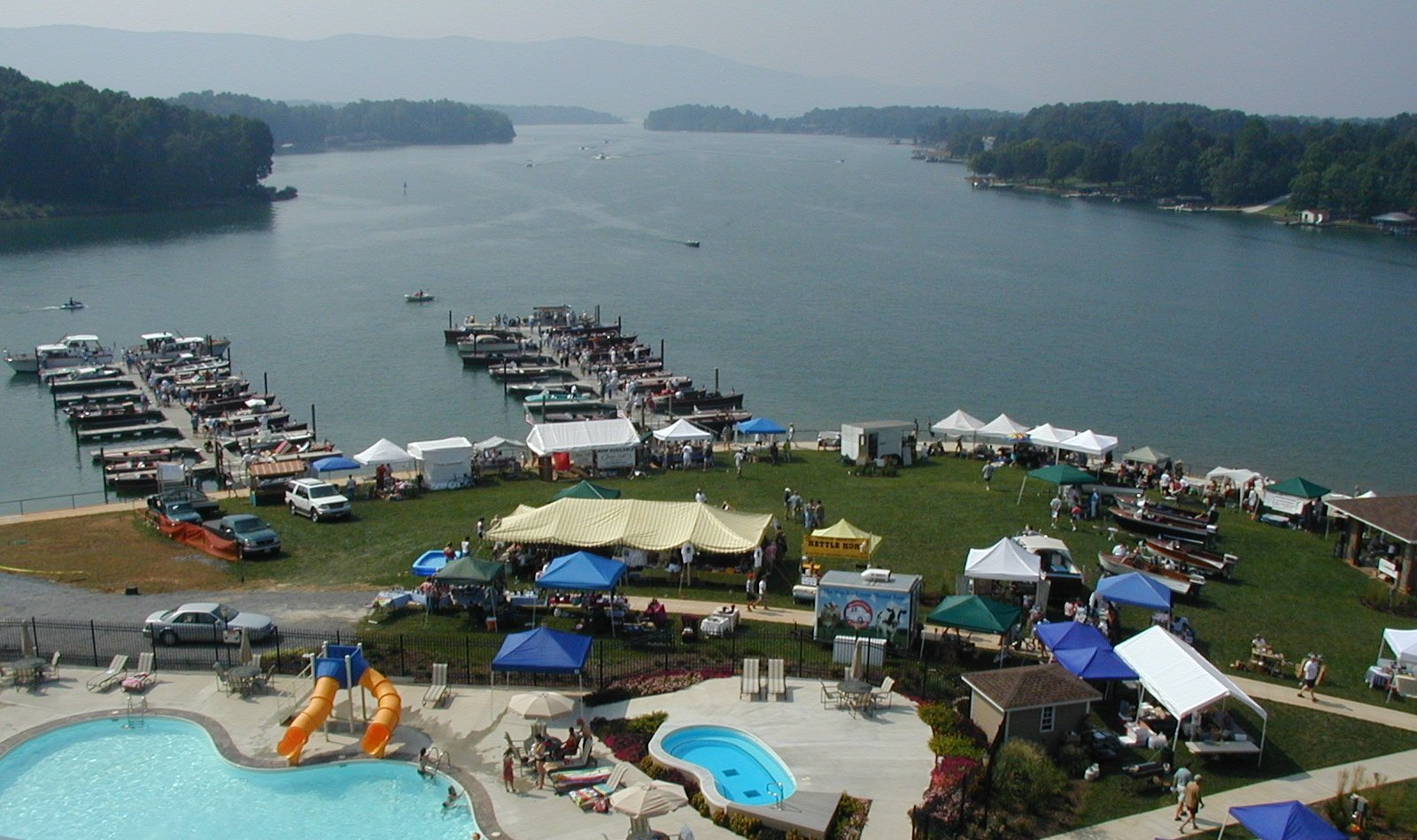

- Location within Virginia Location within the United States
- Location: Bedford, Franklin, and Pittsylvania counties, Virginia
- Coordinates: 37°03′26″N 79°35′47″W
- Type: Reservoir
- Primary inflows: Roanoke River; Blackwater River
- Primary outflows: Leesville Lake, Roanoke River
- Basin countries: United States
- Surface area: 32 sq mi (83 km^{2})
- Average depth: 55 ft (17 m)
- Max. depth: 220 ft (67 m)
- Water volume: 2.8 km^{3} (2,300,000 acre⋅ft)
- Shore length^{1}: 500 mi (800 km)
- Surface elevation: 795 ft (242 m)
- ^{1} Shore length is not a well-defined measure.

Smith Mountain Lake is a large reservoir in the Roanoke Region of Virginia, United States, located southeast of the City of Roanoke and southwest of Lynchburg. The lake was created in 1963 by the Smith Mountain Dam impounding the Roanoke River. The majority of the south shore of the lake lies in Franklin County while a small portion, including access to the dam, lies in Pittsylvania County. Bedford County makes up the northern half of the lake, with the Roanoke River as the dividing line. The lake has become a popular recreation spot and has also experienced significant development in the last decade. It is the largest lake contained entirely within the Commonwealth of Virginia.

== History ==
Initial proposals were made in the late 1920s to dam the Roanoke River and the Blackwater River at the Smith Mountain gorge to generate electricity. Construction on the Smith Mountain Dam began in 1960 and was completed in 1963. The lake reached its normal water level in March 1966. The lake covers 20,600 acres (83 km^{2}) and has over 500 miles (800 km) of shoreline. The north shore of the lake lies entirely in Bedford County.

Located along the lake shore at Wirtz, Virginia, is the Gwin Dudley Home Site, listed on the National Register of Historic Places in 2008.

=== Development ===
Throughout the 1960s and 1970s, the area around Smith Mountain Lake remained rural and remote with tobacco farms and other agriculture. Marinas provided the bulk of public access in the early years of the lake. The limited early residential developments around the lake consisted largely of small trailer parks and modest houses. However, residential growth has been steady since the mid-1980s and increasingly upscale with large lakefront houses, condominiums, and communities centered on golf courses. The lake has attracted many who commute to Roanoke and Lynchburg and many retirees, many of whom have relocated from the Northeast. By the late 1990s, the number and affluence of the new residents resulted in the construction of new retail and commercial developments near the lake. Recent shoreline development has been limited to residential construction. With the enactment of Federal oversight of shoreline development in 1998 coupled with soaring real estate values, there is an escalating loss of public access to the lake as the lake's marinas are sold for residential development.

State Route 122 is the only primary highway that crosses the lake, though State Route 24, State Route 116, and State Route 40 are nearby.

=== Licensing ===
American Electric Power (AEP) is licensed to operate the Smith Mountain Project by the Federal Energy Regulatory Commission (FERC). The initial license term was for fifty years. In 1998, AEP began the process of relicensing. Under the requirements of relicensing, AEP was required to perform numerous studies to determine management requirements during the upcoming license term. In December, 2009 the U.S. Federal Energy Regulatory Commission granted Appalachian Power a new license to operate the hydro-electricity plant. The new 30-year license replaces the original 50-year license and addresses recreational and environmental management.

=== Shoreline management ===
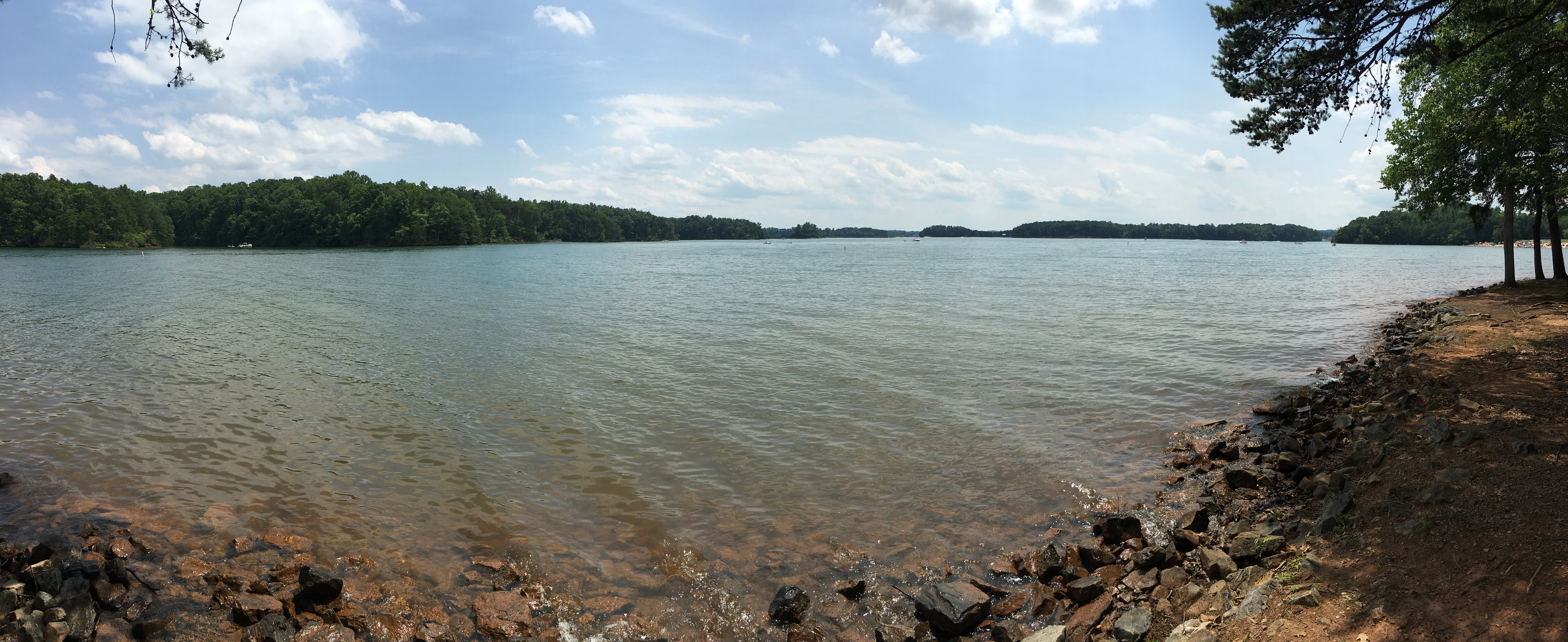
View from shore of Smith Mountain Lake

In 1998, the FERC required AEP to devise and implement a shoreline management plan. The Shoreline Management Plan (SMP) limits the development of all property within the "project boundary." Local zoning regulations have been effectively superseded by the SMP regulations. AEP acts as the permitting agency. Any variance requests are reviewed by interested State and Federal agencies such as the Virginia Department of Wildlife Resources. Disagreements must first proceed to the FERC, then be appealed through the Federal Judicial System.

== Geography ==
The area lies in a broad valley nestled in the Blue Ridge Mountains of rural south-central Virginia. Before the lake's creation, farming and logging were the primary industries. Communities around the lake include Moneta, Huddleston, Union Hall, White House, Penhook and Goodview. There is a post office located at 1080 Tolers Ferry Rd, Huddleston, VA 24104. The Booker T. Washington National Monument is near the west end of the lake.

The level of the lake normally varies by one to two feet (0.3 to 0.6 m) during the day and night, as water flows through (and is pumped back through) the dam. The normal maximum level of the lake (also known as "full pond") is regulated to 795 feet (242 m) above sea level. The normal observed level (also known as "normal pond") is 794.2 feet (242.1 m). The level can be significantly lower during periods of extended drought. Lake levels were sometimes about six feet (1.8 m) below normal during the period of 2001 to 2003, after five years of below-average rainfall.

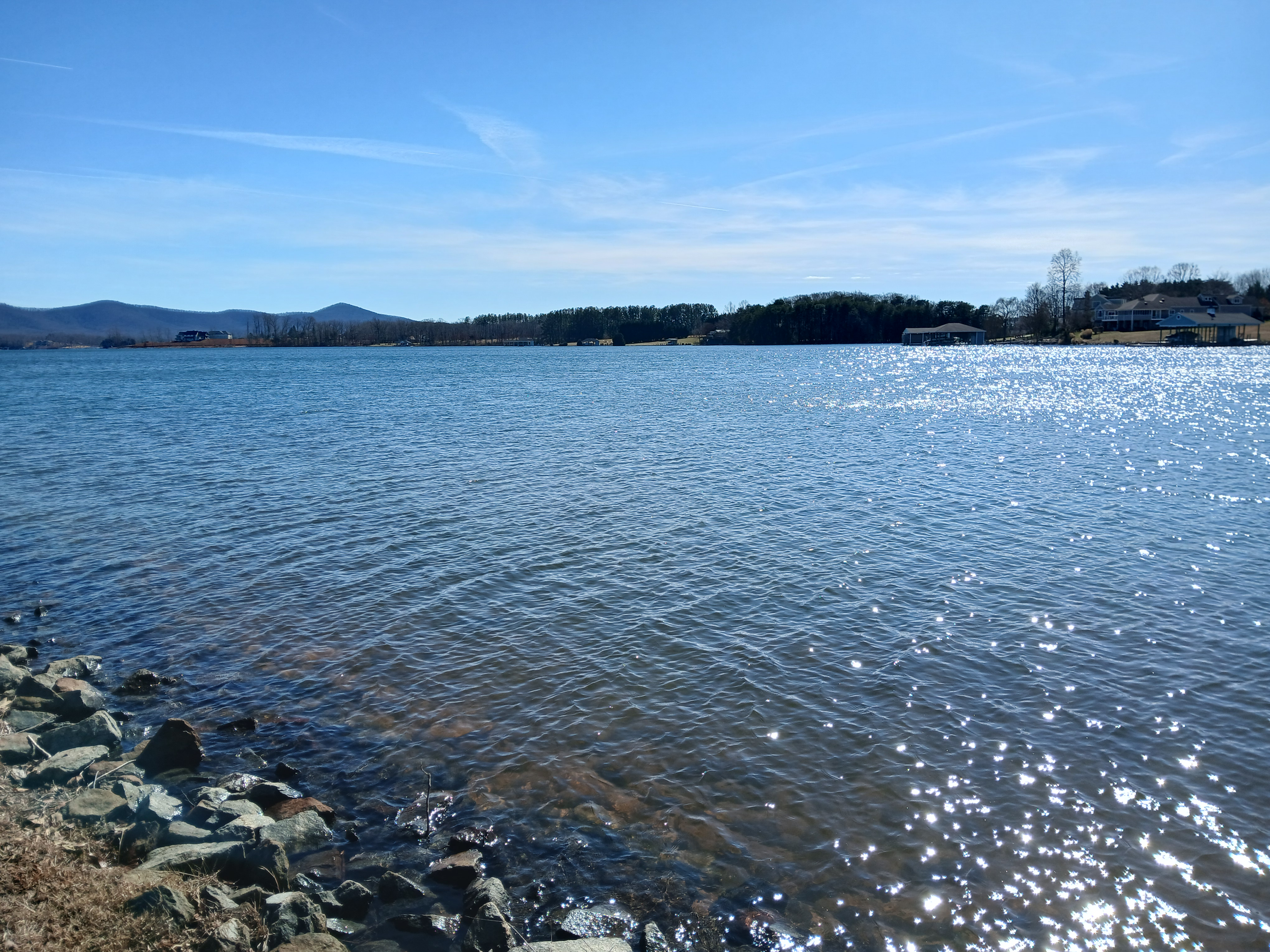
View of Smith Mountain Lake with Blue Ridge in the background

== Recreation and public access ==
Smith Mountain Lake has become a popular recreational area. Boating, water skiing, wakeboarding, riding personal watercraft, and sailing are common activities as is fishing, especially for striped bass. The lake has hosted several professional fishing tournaments. Smith Mountain Lake State Park opened in 1983 and provided a beach and a section for swimming. Golf at one of the four nearby courses is a popular landside activity.

The majority of access to the lake is through private residential property. About a dozen private marinas provide various public access opportunities, which may be fee-based or free (through some have been recently converted to private, residential developments due to economic and regulatory pressure.) The fee-based state park (located on the Bedford County side, off Smith Mountain Parkway), the free Smith Mountain Community Park (located on the Franklin County side of the lake) and six government-managed boat launching ramps also provide public access.

== Fishery ==
Striped bass are stocked into the reservoir using fingerlings grown out from the spawn of fish that have migrated from downstream Kerr Reservoir to the vicinity of Brookneal. The Vic Thomas Fish Hatchery in Brookneal primarily provides the freshwater strain striped bass. The striped bass fishery produced multiple former state record striped bass caught during the 1980s and 1990s. In 2003, however, a fish kill among adult striped bass occurred due to an outbreak of parasitic arthropods of genus Achtheres, loss of forage associated with an abnormal shad winterkill during 2002 to 2003 and overpopulation. Annual fingerling stocking rates in the reservoir have been reduced from a high of 450,000 (21.8 per acre) in 1998 to an average of 336,179 per year (16.3 per acre) between 2010 and 2016.

== In popular culture ==
- The 2012 independent film Lake Effects features Smith Mountain Lake. It's a fictional tale of a family raised on and later returning to the lake. The dramatic comedy first aired on the Hallmark Movie Channel during May 2012.
- The lake was featured prominently in the 1991 movie comedy What About Bob?, directed by Frank Oz and starring Bill Murray, Richard Dreyfuss and Julie Hagerty. It served as the stand-in for Lake Winnipesaukee in New Hampshire.
- Smith Mountain Lake is a setting in "Mind Over Matter," an episode of the TV series The Outer Limits, which features actor Mark Hamill.
