= Smith Mountain (Blue Ridge Mountains) =

Mountain in Virginia, United States of America

Coordinates: 37°00′51″N 79°33′56″W

Smith Mountain is a mountain summit located in Bedford County, Virginia and Pittsylvania County, Virginia. Part of the foothills of the Blue Ridge Mountains, it is home to the Smith Mountain Dam.
