= National Register of Historic Places listings in Bedford County, Virginia =

Location of Bedford County in Virginia

This is a list of the National Register of Historic Places listings in Bedford County, Virginia.

This is intended to be a complete list of the properties and districts on the National Register of Historic Places in Bedford County, Virginia, United States. The locations of National Register properties and districts for which the latitude and longitude coordinates are included below, may be seen in an online map.

There are 37 properties and districts listed on the National Register in the county, including 2 National Historic Landmarks.

This National Park Service list is complete through NPS recent listings posted July 10, 2026.

== Current listings ==
	Name on the Register	Image	Date listed	Location	City or town	Description
1	Avenel	Avenel	January 30, 1992 (#92000003)	413 Avenel Ave. 37°20′17″N 79°31′28″W	Bedford	
2	John D. Ballard House	John D. Ballard House	December 12, 1997 (#97001505)	525 Longwood Ave. 37°20′22″N 79°31′12″W	Bedford	
3	Bedford Historic District	Bedford Historic District	October 4, 1984 (#84000031)	Roughly bounded by Longwood, Bedford, and Mountain Aves. and Peaks, Oak, Grove, and Washington Sts. 37°20′04″N 79°31′25″W	Bedford	
4	Bedford Historic Meetinghouse	Bedford Historic Meetinghouse	January 31, 1978 (#78003182)	153 W. Main St. 37°20′05″N 79°31′32″W	Bedford	
5	Bedford Training School	Bedford Training School	August 17, 2021 (#100006838)	310 South Bridge St. 37°19′54″N 79°31′29″W	Bedford	
6	Bellevue	Bellevue	December 19, 1990 (#89001917)	Bellevue Rd., 1 mile (1.6 km) east of Goode; 37°21′52″N 79°22′02″W	Goode	
7	Bellevue Rural Historic District	Bellevue Rural Historic District	November 30, 2005 (#05001345)	Bellevue Rd. 37°22′21″N 79°22′52″W	Forest	
8	Big Otter Mill	Big Otter Mill	October 30, 1998 (#98001314)	State Route 122; 37°23′27″N 79°30′13″W	Bedford	
9	Blue Ridge Parkway	Blue Ridge Parkway	December 13, 2024 (#100011353)	Blue Ridge Parkway through Virginia and North Carolina; 37°25′53″N 79°45′01″W	Montvale vicinity	
10	Brook Hill Farm	Brook Hill Farm	June 6, 1997 (#97000489)	0.75 miles (1.21 km) south of the junction of U.S. Route 221 and Bellevue Rd. 37°22′05″N 79°22′29″W	Forest	
11	Burks-Guy-Hagen House	Burks-Guy-Hagen House	December 19, 1985 (#85003201)	520 Peaks St. 37°20′22″N 79°31′23″W	Bedford	
12	Cifax Rural Historic District	Cifax Rural Historic District	February 20, 1992 (#92000052)	Junction of Otterville and Old Cifax Rds., and the surrounding valley area 37°24′39″N 79°24′28″W	Cifax	
13	Bowling Eldridge House	Bowling Eldridge House	August 12, 1993 (#93000824)	1651 Fox Hill Rd. 37°28′22″N 79°12′07″W	Lynchburg	
14	Elk Hill	Elk Hill	April 2, 1973 (#73001996)	Northwest of Forest on Perrowville Rd. 37°24′33″N 79°20′36″W	Forest	
15	Elks National Home	Elks National Home	May 29, 2008 (#08000479)	931 Ashland Ave. 37°20′36″N 79°32′06″W	Bedford	
16	Fancy Farm	Fancy Farm	January 7, 1972 (#72001384)	On State Route 43, north of its junction with Kelso Mill Rd. 37°23′54″N 79°33′23″W	Bedford	
17	Susie G. Gibson High School	Susie G. Gibson High School	August 17, 2021 (#100006839)	600 Edmund St. 37°19′35″N 79°31′32″W	Bedford	
18	Hope Dawn	Hope Dawn	October 9, 1974 (#74002106)	Northwest of Lynchburg off Abert Rd. 37°29′55″N 79°13′59″W	Lynchburg	
19	Liberty Hall	Liberty Hall	August 12, 2009 (#09000613)	12000 E. U.S. Route 460; 37°18′23″N 79°18′48″W	Forest	
20	Locust Level	Locust Level	December 21, 1990 (#90001841)	U.S. Route 460, west of its junction with Goose Creek Valley Rd. 37°23′11″N 79°44′14″W	Montvale	
21	Montvale High School		July 16, 2026 (#100013215)	11555 Lynchburg Salem Turnpike West (US 460); 37°23′06″N 79°43′57″W	Montvale	
22	Mount Airy	Mount Airy	December 19, 1990 (#90001823)	Junction of Chellis Ford and Mt. Airy Rds. 37°06′19″N 79°25′03″W	Leesville	
23	New London Academy	New London Academy	April 13, 1972 (#72001385)	Near the junction of U.S. Route 460 and New London Rd. 37°18′24″N 79°18′19″W	Forest	
24	New Prospect Church	New Prospect Church	March 31, 2000 (#00000312)	4445 Sheep Creek Rd. 37°25′39″N 79°38′09″W	Bedford	
25	Old Rectory	Old Rectory	July 24, 1973 (#73001998)	South of Perrowville on Perrowville Rd. 37°24′10″N 79°20′18″W	Perrowville	
26	Olive Branch Missionary Baptist Church	Olive Branch Missionary Baptist Church	May 4, 2007 (#07000392)	5982 Joppa Mill Rd. 37°14′55″N 79°37′33″W	Moneta	
27	Otterburn	Otterburn	February 16, 2001 (#01000146)	Big Island Rd. 37°22′04″N 79°29′48″W	Bedford	
28	Pleasant View	Pleasant View	November 15, 2006 (#06001043)	5050 Bellevue Rd. 37°20′48″N 79°21′42″W	Forest	
29	Poplar Forest	Poplar Forest	November 12, 1969 (#69000223)	1542 Bateman Bridge Rd.; 1776 Poplar Forest Parkwayy; 37°20′53″N 79°15′52″W	Lynchburg	A boundary revision was approved September 24, 2025.
30	Quarles-Walker House	Quarles-Walker House	March 23, 2022 (#100007569)	1318 Songbird Ave. 37°18′03″N 79°30′09″W	Bedford vicinity	
31	Rothsay	Rothsay	October 30, 1992 (#92001387)	Northern side of U.S. Route 221, 2,000 feet (610 m) east of its junction with Thomas Jefferson Rd. 37°22′01″N 79°17′01″W	Forest	
32	Saint Stephen's Episcopal Church	Saint Stephen's Episcopal Church	November 7, 1985 (#85002766)	Perrowville Rd. 37°22′41″N 79°18′29″W	Forest	
33	Sammynick		February 29, 2024 (#100010002)	1108 Ashland Avenue; 37°21′03″N 79°32′11″W	Bedford	
34	Thomas Methodist Episcopal Chapel	Thomas Methodist Episcopal Chapel	August 11, 2004 (#04000844)	Penicks Mill Rd. 37°22′43″N 79°37′37″W	Thaxton	
35	Three Otters	Three Otters	September 15, 1970 (#70000785)	West of the junction of State Route 43 and Three Otters Rd. 37°21′27″N 79°32′43″W	Bedford	
36	Twin Oaks Farm	Twin Oaks Farm	July 5, 2001 (#01000704)	Sheep Creek Rd. 37°25′37″N 79°37′57″W	Peaks of Otter	
37	Woodbourne	Woodbourne	July 2, 1973 (#73001997)	Northeast of Forest off Gumtree Rd. 37°22′11″N 79°16′44″W	Forest	

== See also ==
- List of National Historic Landmarks in Virginia
- National Register of Historic Places listings in Virginia
