= Pleasant View =

Pleasant View may refer to:

== United States ==
=== Cities and communities ===
- Pleasant View, Colorado
- Pleasant View, Indiana
- Pleasant View, Kentucky
- Pleasant View, Maryland, a settlement near Point of Rocks, Maryland
- Pleasant View, Tennessee
- Pleasant View, Utah
- Pleasant View, Washington
- Pleasant View Township (disambiguation)

=== Buildings ===
All in the United States

- Pleasant View (Forest, Virginia), a historic house
- Pleasant View (UTA station), a transit station in Pleasant View, Utah
- Pleasant View (Midlothian, Virginia), listed on the National Register of Historic Places in Chesterfield County, Virginia
- Pleasant View School for the Arts, in Canton, Ohio
- Pleasant View Home, a residential facility and former historic home in Concord, New Hampshire
- Samuel F. Glass House, a house in Franklin, Tennessee, also known as Pleasant View

== Canada ==
- Pleasant View, Toronto, Ontario, an officially designated neighbourhood

== South Africa ==
- Pleasant View, Gauteng, a small village close to Vanderbijlpark

== See also ==
- Pleasantview (disambiguation)
