= Rothesay (disambiguation) =

Rothesay is the principal town on the Isle of Bute, Scotland.

Rothesay or Rothsay may also refer to:

== Places ==
- Rothesay, New Brunswick, Canada
  - Rothesay (electoral district), Canada
- Rothesay Parish, New Brunswick, Canada
- Rothesay Bay, a suburb in Auckland, New Zealand
- Rothesay (Parliament of Scotland constituency)
- Rothsay (Forest, Virginia), United States
- Rothsay, Minnesota, United States
- Rothsay, Ontario, Canada
- Rothsay, Richmond, Virginia, United States
- Rothsay, Western Australia
- Isle of Bute, Scotland, formerly called "Rothesay"

== People ==
- Duke of Rothesay

== Schools ==
- Rothesay Academy, a secondary school in Rothesay, Isle of Bute
- Rothesay Netherwood School, in Rothesay, New Brunswick
- Rothesay School, in Berkhamsted, England

== Ships ==
- HMS Rothesay, the name of two ships of the Royal Navy
- Rothsay Castle (ship), a paddle steamer in the United Kingdom
- Rothesay, a 1444-ton sailing ship made famous by female mariner Bessie Hall in 1870

== Other uses ==
- Rothesay (insurer)
