= Saint Stephen's Episcopal Church (Forest, Virginia) =

Historic church in Virginia, US

- U.S. National Register of Historic Places
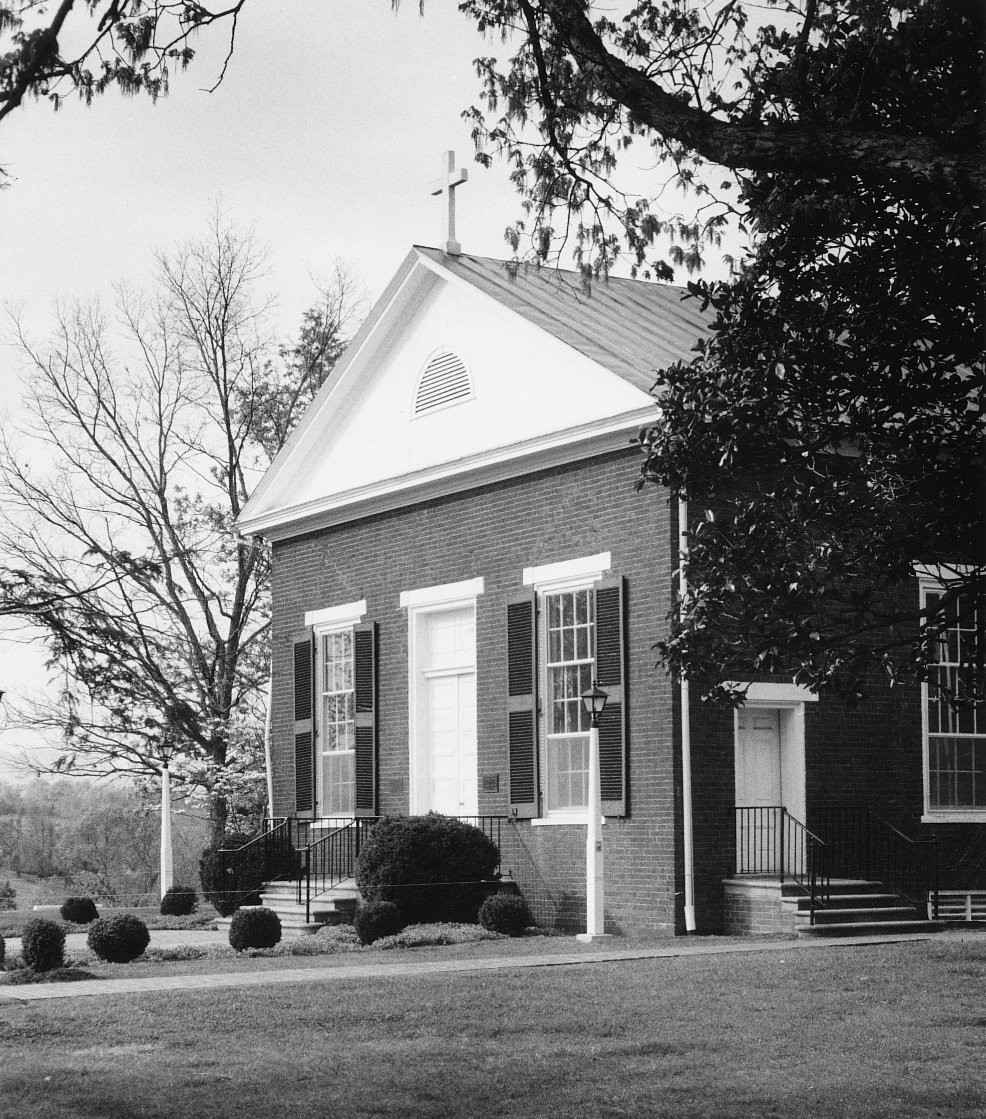
- Saint Stephens Episcopal Church located in Bedford County, Virginia.
- Location: 1695 Perrowville Road, Forest, Virginia
- Built: c. 1844
- Architectural style: Greek Revival
- NRHP reference No.: 85002766
- Added to NRHP: 1985

Saint Stephen's Episcopal Church is a historic Episcopal church that was founded in 1824 by Rev. Nicholas Hamner Cobbs (later bishop of Alabama). The Church sits on a historical plot in Forest, Bedford County, Virginia which was originally owned by former president Thomas Jefferson, and donated to the church by Elizabeth Moseley Radford. Saint Stephens was listed on the National Register of Historic Places in 1985.

== History ==
Saint Stephen's Episcopal church, the second oldest Episcopal Church in the Lynchburg area, was established in 1824 by then Rev. Cobbs. Five decades earlier, in 1773, future Virginia governor and U.S. President Thomas Jefferson had inherited the plantation known as Poplar Forest, which later in his life he rebuilt and used as a retreat home. Jefferson had given the land which now underlies the Church to his eldest daughter Martha Jefferson Randolph for her dowry in 1790. Between 1824-1839, Cobbs was also the Rector of Trinity Episcopal Church in Boonsboro and rode his horse from there to Saint Stephen's to provide Sunday services until he resigned in 1839.

Nicholas Hamner Cobbs grew up in the Bedford area and was raised in a good home, his mother a devout Christian unlike his father. With his devotion to studying, and teaching locally by the age of seventeen, Cobbs was regarded as a hard-working and faithful man. Cobbs was also the principal for the New London Academy between October 19, 1824 and September 28, 1830.

The first building was completed in 1825 on part of the Poplar Forest tract. Maartha Jefferson Randolph sold it to the widow who has a girl had been known as Anne Irvine, who had married General William Moseley of Princess Anne County in Bedford in 1784. However, the Moseleys generally lived at another plantation in Powhatan County down the James River (nearer the state capital at Richmond), due in part to Gen. Moseley's continuing public duties (including as Treasurer of Virginia). Anne Irvine Moseley had given the land to her daughter Elizabeth Moseley Radford, who married William Radford in 1809 and in 1824 donated it to the church where the original building was torn down and the present one stands today.

In the same year, William Radford and Elizabeth Moseley Radford deeded additional land to enlarge the church property and provide a cemetery for members. The cemetery is still in use today.

in March 1898, a bad wind storm damaged the church threatening to indefinitely close the church. The south gable had fallen in which compromised the structure. Fortunately it was repaired with both the help of the congregation and the community.

A lack of funds to make necessary repairs closed the church temporarily in 1911, although occasional services were held.

1941, at the instigation of Malcolm Griffin, the church was restored and reopened. Since that date, services have been held continuously. A 2004 renovation project expanded the choir area and enlarged the front area where preaching occurs.

It was listed on the National Register of Historic Places in 1985. The associated Old Rectory was listed in 1973.

== Furnishings ==
The church has retained much of the original furnishings, including the pews, the altar rail and the Bishop's chair. All the doors and windows are original. In 1897, the gallery at the back of the church was removed, but the side door entrance remains. In the same year, the wooden ceiling and a recessed chancel were added. It is believed that the marble baptismal font was installed during this period, since the pedestal bears the label of Lynchburg Marble Works which was in business from 1879-1883.

When the church reopened in the 1940s, the present altar, the Priest's and Bishop's chairs (designed by local artisans Julian and George Lindsey), and the altar cross and prayer stand were given as memorials. The Tiffany stained glass window above the altar was given by a subscription raised by Ethel Dirom.

== Design ==
The Church is a one-storey, three-bay building and has a partial basement. It is covered in oversized brick and Greek Revival style trim, and has a low pitched roof with a wooden cross at the top. In total, the building measures 36 feet wide and 61 feet long.
