= W90 =

W90 may refer to:

- Conventional watt, a unit of power
- DSC-W90, a digital camera
- New London Airport (Virginia)
- Small dodecicosahedron
- W90, a classification in masters athletics
