= New London Airport =

New London Airport may refer to:

- Groton–New London Airport, Groton, Connecticut, U.S. (IATA: GON, ICAO: KGON, FAA LID: GON)
- New London Airport (Virginia), Forest, Virginia, U.S. (FAA LID: W90)
- Thames Estuary Airport, a potential new airport for London, England
