= New Prospect =

New Prospect may refer to:

- McEntyre, Alabama, an unincorporated community also known as New Prospect
- New Prospect, South Carolina, an unincorporated community
- New Prospect, Wisconsin, an unincorporated community
- New Prospect Church, a church in Virginia
- New Prospect, Illinois, a fictional town, the setting of the 2021 novel Crossroads by Jonathan Franzen
