= London Airport =

London Airport may refer to:

== United Kingdom ==
- Airports of London, six international airports and several smaller airports serving London, England
  - London Heathrow Airport, main international airport in Greater London, known as London Airport from 1946 to 1966
- Eday London Airport, Orkney, Scotland, known locally as just London Airport as it is near the Bay of London

== Canada ==
- London International Airport, in London, Ontario
- London/Chapeskie Field Airport, in London, Ontario

== United States ==
- Groton–New London Airport, Connecticut, U.S.
- London-Corbin Airport, in London, Kentucky
- New London Airport (Virginia), U.S.

== Elsewhere ==
- King Phalo Airport, formerly East London Airport, in East London, South Africa
