= Pleasantview =

Pleasantview may refer to:

- Pleasantview, Edmonton, a neighborhood in Edmonton, Alberta, Canada
- Pleasantview, Newfoundland and Labrador, a community in Newfoundland and Labrador, Canada
- Pleasantview, Idaho, USA
- Pleasantview Township, Michigan, USA
- A neighborhood in the computer games The Sims and The Sims 2.

== See also ==
- Pleasant View (disambiguation)
