= Woodbourne (Forest, Virginia) =

Historic house in Virginia, United States

- U.S. National Register of Historic Places
- Virginia Landmarks Register
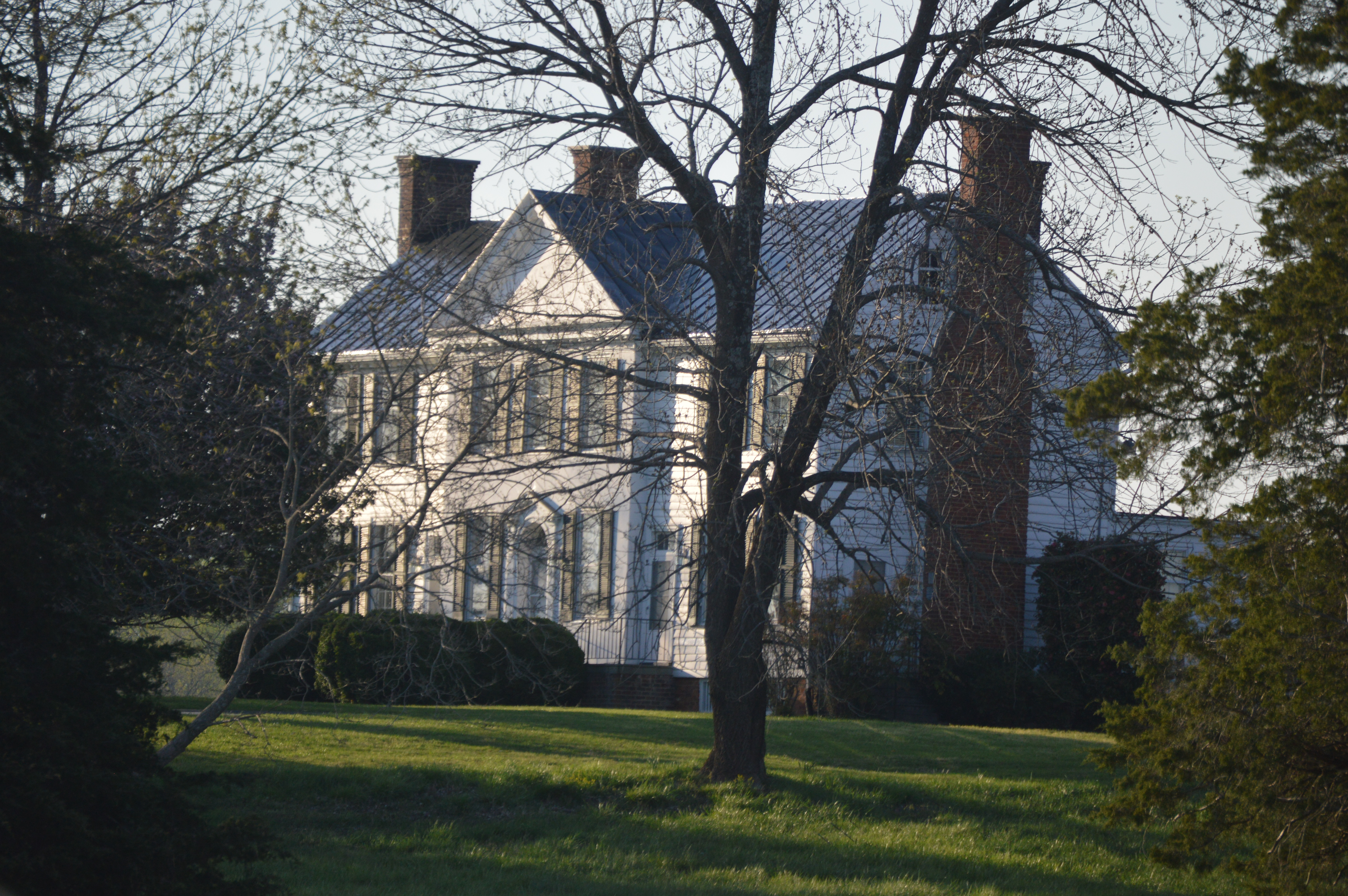
- Roadside view of the house

- Location within Virginia Location within the United States
- Location: Off Gumtree Road, northeast of Forest, Virginia
- Coordinates: 37°22′15″N 79°16′37″W
- Area: 90 acres (36 ha)
- Built: c. 1785
- Architectural style: Federal
- NRHP reference No.: 73001997
- VLR No.: 009-0033

Significant dates
- Added to NRHP: July 2, 1973
- Designated VLR: April 17, 1973

Woodbourne is a historic plantation house located near Forest, Bedford County, Virginia. It was built in three two-story sections and representative of Federal period architecture. The earliest dates to about 1785, and is the frame east wing. The central stuccoed brick section was added about 1810, and the frame west wing between about 1815 and 1820. It has a slate gable roof with a central pediment and exterior end chimneys. Also on the property are a contributing small, handsome brick office, a weatherboarded cook's house and storeroom, a lattice wellhouse, and icehouse.

It was listed on the National Register of Historic Places in 1973.
