= Elk Hill (Forest, Virginia) =

Historic house in Virginia, United States

- U.S. National Register of Historic Places
- Virginia Landmarks Register
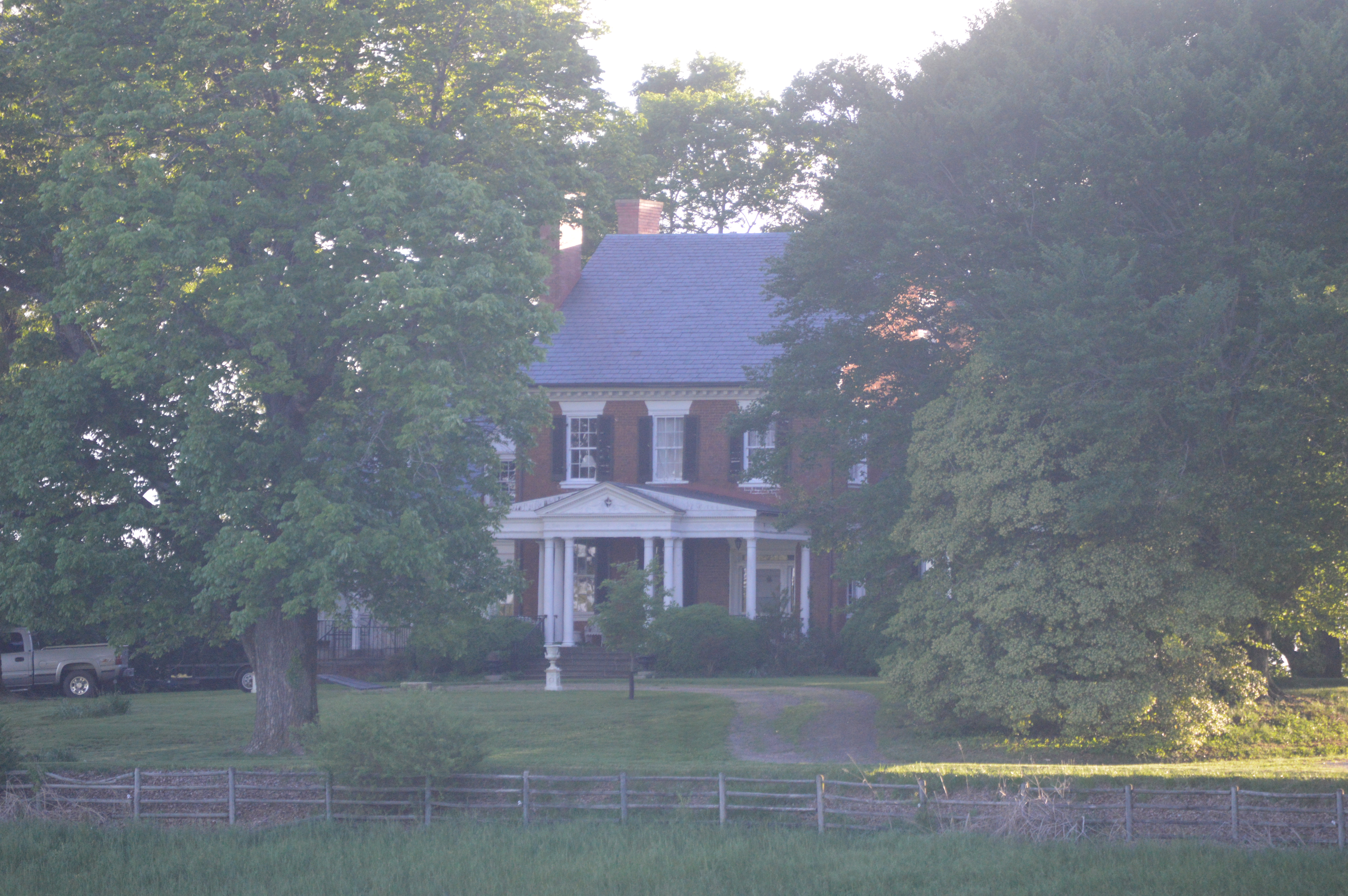
- Front of the house

- Location within Virginia Location within the United States
- Location: NW of Forest on VA 663, near Forest, Virginia
- Coordinates: 37°24′25″N 79°20′57″W
- Area: 400 acres (160 ha)
- Built: c. 1797
- Architectural style: Federal
- NRHP reference No.: 73001996
- VLR No.: 009-0006

Significant dates
- Added to NRHP: April 2, 1973
- Designated VLR: November 21, 1972

Elk Hill is a historic plantation house located near Forest, Bedford County, Virginia. It was built about 1797, and consists of a 2 1/2-story, three bay brick central section with flanking wings in the Federal style. It has a slate gable roof and a front porch added in 1928, when restored by the architect Preston Craighill. The main block has twin brick exterior chimneys. Also on the property are a contributing small, handsome brick office, a weatherboarded cook's house and storeroom, a lattice wellhouse, and icehouse.

It was listed on the National Register of Historic Places in 1973.
