= Perrowville, Virginia =

Unincorporated community in Virginia, United States

- Unincorporated community
- Location within Virginia Location within the United States
- Coordinates: 37°25′04″N 79°21′02″W
- Country: United States
- State: Virginia
- County: Bedford
- Elevation: 876 ft (267 m)
- Time zone: UTC-5 (Eastern (EST))
  - Summer (DST): UTC-4 (EDT)
- Area code: 540
- GNIS feature ID: 1477617

Perrowville is an unincorporated community in Bedford County, Virginia, United States. Perrowville is located on State Route 644, 11.5 miles (18.5 km) west of Lynchburg.

The Old Rectory, which is listed on the National Register of Historic Places, is located near Perrowville.
