= Elks National Home =

- Spring Oak Senior Living
- U.S. National Register of Historic Places
- U.S. Historic district
- Virginia Landmarks Register
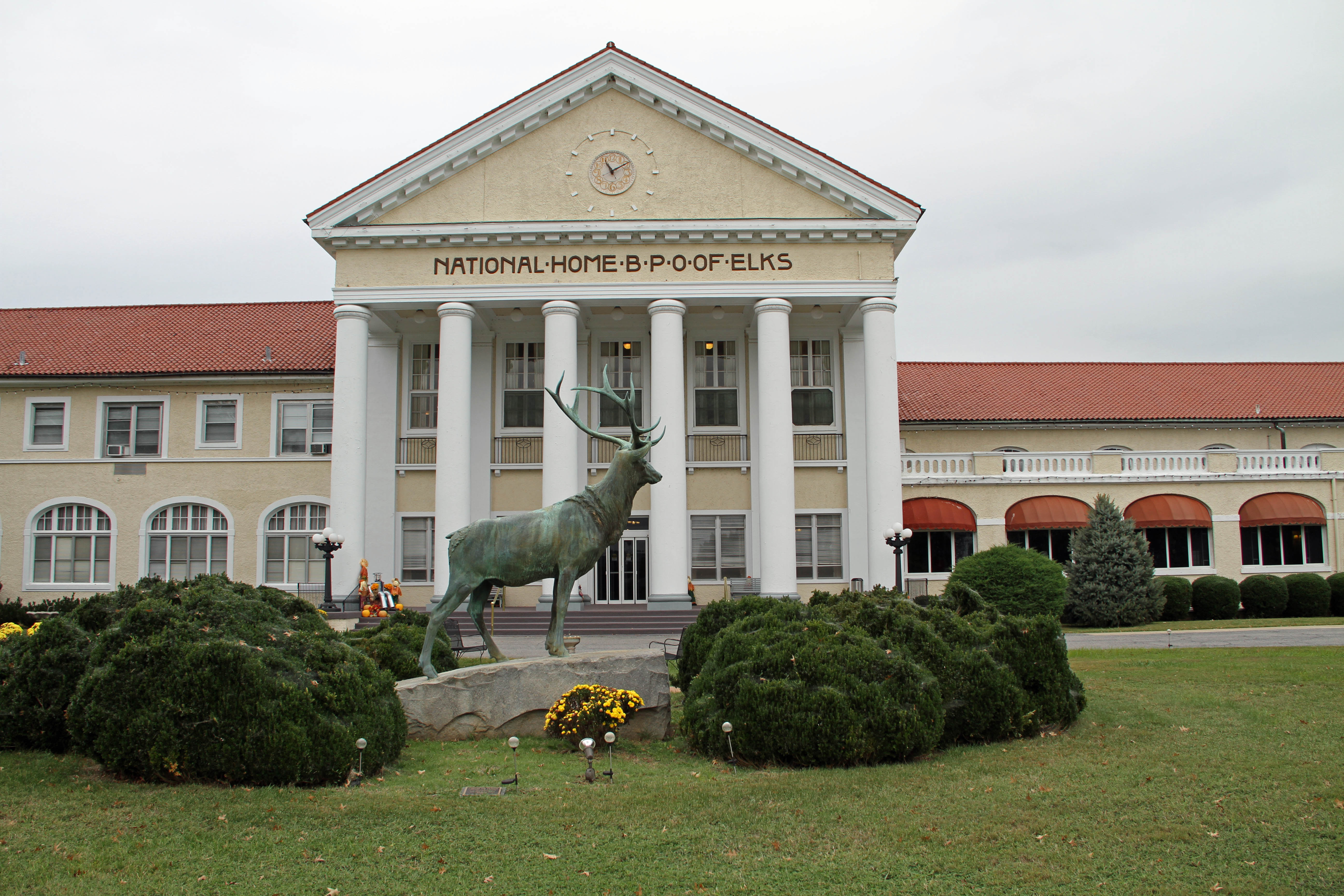

- Location within Virginia Location within the United States
- Location: 931 Ashland Ave., Bedford, Virginia
- Coordinates: 37.34289°N 79.53498°W
- Area: 100 acres (40 ha)
- Built: 1916
- Architect: Ottenheimer Stern & Reichert; Clinton & Russell; Clark & Crowe
- Architectural style: Colonial Revival, Mediterranean Revival
- NRHP reference No.: 08000479
- VLR No.: 141-0060

Significant dates
- Added to NRHP: May 29, 2008
- Designated VLR: March 20, 2008

Spring Oak Senior Living Community - Elks Home (formerly The Elks National Home) is a retirement home and national historic district located at Bedford, Virginia.

== History ==
The Elks National Home was built in 1916 by the Benevolent and Protective Order of Elks, who first started the home in 1903. In February 1912, the building committee of the Elks National Home commissioned Ottenheimer, Stern and Reichert architects of Chicago to prepare plans for the complex to cost about $300,000. The Elks National Home was dedicated on Saturday, July 8, 1916. The Elks National Home historic district includes twenty-three contributing buildings, three contributing sites, a contributing structure, and two contributing objects.

The Elks Home was featured briefly in the 1991 film What About Bob?, where it stands in as a mental institution.

Its 100-acre (40 ha) property was listed on the National Register of Historic Places in 2008.

== Incident ==
In November 1923 the facility was the site of an accidental mass poisoning. Nine men were killed after drinking apple cider served in the dining room. A local farmer had produced the drink and stored it in a barrel that had been used to hold a pesticide.

In 2013, the Elks National Home property was sold to New River Assisted Living for $4.5 million. The name of the property was changed to English Meadows Elks Home.

== Modern uses ==
The Elks Home is popular locally for the large display of Christmas decorations it puts up each year. Visitors enter the driveway in their vehicles and slowly proceed through the displays, which line the driveway, free of charge.

Elks National Home and Retirement Center is the name of a nonprofit organization with 501(c)(3) status that formerly owned the Elks National Home property. The nonprofit organization has discontinued operations as of 2019, and its continuing source of revenue are the bequests of an ongoing trust, and the nonprofit organization intends to discontinue operations as soon as practical.

== See also ==
- Bedford Historic District (Bedford, Virginia)
