= Pleasant View Township =

Pleasant View Township may refer to:

- Pleasant View Township, Macon County, Illinois
- Pleasant View Township, Cherokee County, Kansas
- Pleasantview Township, Michigan
- Pleasant View Township, Norman County, Minnesota
- Pleasant View Township, Holt County, Nebraska
- Pleasant View Township, Grand Forks County, North Dakota, in Grand Forks County, North Dakota
- Pleasant View Township, Beadle County, South Dakota, in Beadle County, South Dakota
