= Rothsay (Forest, Virginia) =

Historic house in Virginia, United States

- U.S. National Register of Historic Places
- Virginia Landmarks Register
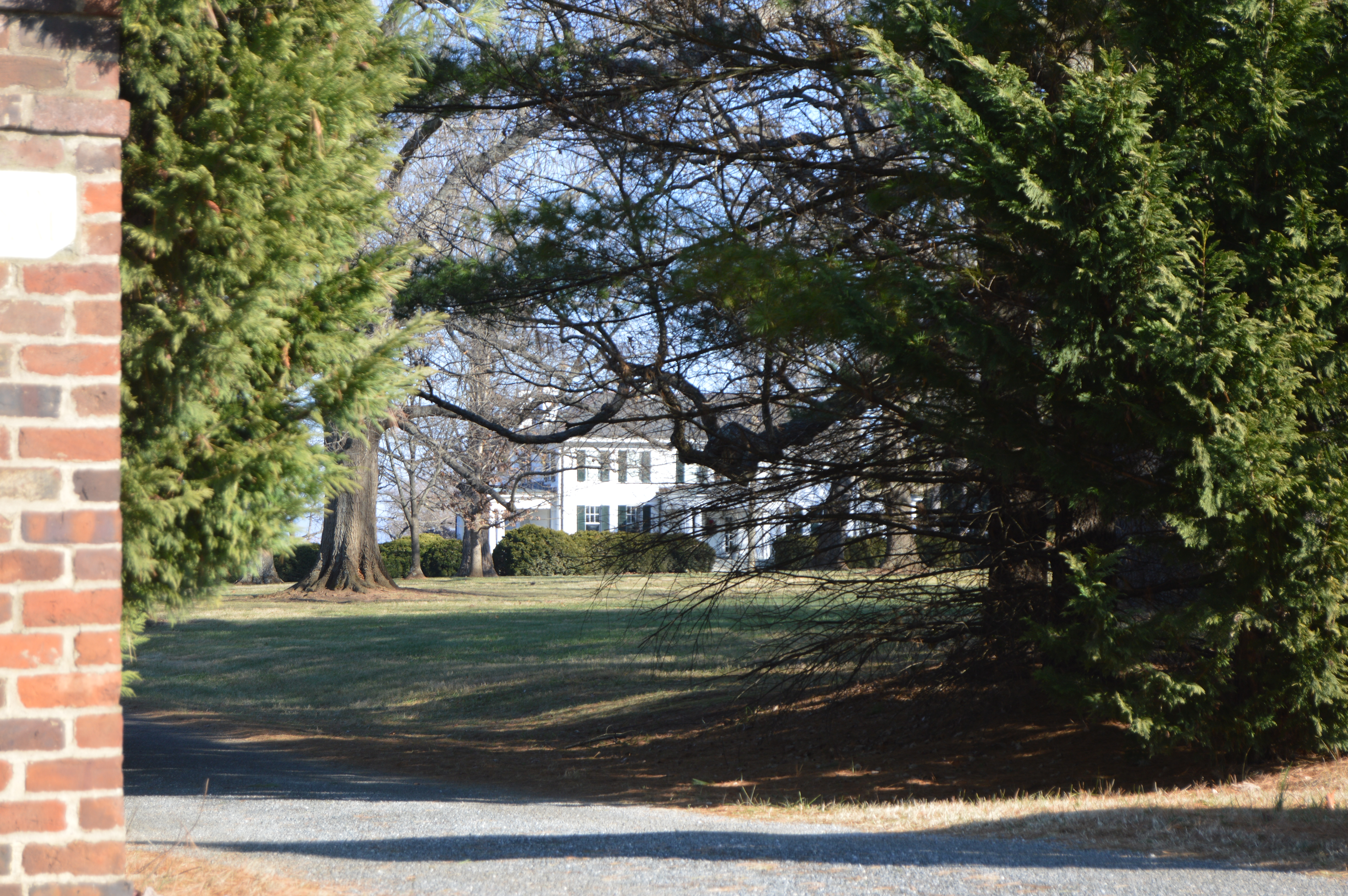
- Roadside view

- Location within Virginia Location within the United States
- Location: Northern side of U.S. Route 221, 2,000 feet (610 m) east of its junction with Thomas Jefferson Road, Forest, Virginia
- Coordinates: 37°21′58″N 79°17′11″W
- Area: 35 acres (14 ha)
- Built: 1914, 1918, 1934
- Architect: Heard & Cardwell; George E. Burnap; Stanhope Johnson
- Architectural style: Georgian Revival, Bungalow/craftsman
- NRHP reference No.: 92001387
- VLR No.: 009-0065

Significant dates
- Added to NRHP: October 30, 1992
- Designated VLR: February 28, 1992

Rothsay is a historic estate located near Forest, Bedford County, Virginia. It was built in 1914, and is a two-story, five-bay, brick and frame dwelling in a Georgian Revival / American Craftsman style. The house measures approximately 55 feet by 37 feet. It has a slate covered hipped roof and one-story front and side porches. Two two-story rear wings were added in 1918. Also on the property are a contributing dovecote / garden seat (1918), pump house (1914), smokehouse (1915), brooder house (1920), and four gate posts (1934) designed by Stanhope Johnson.

It was listed on the National Register of Historic Places in 1992.
