= John D. Ballard House =

Historic house in Virginia, United States

- U.S. National Register of Historic Places
- U.S. Historic district – Contributing property
- Virginia Landmarks Register
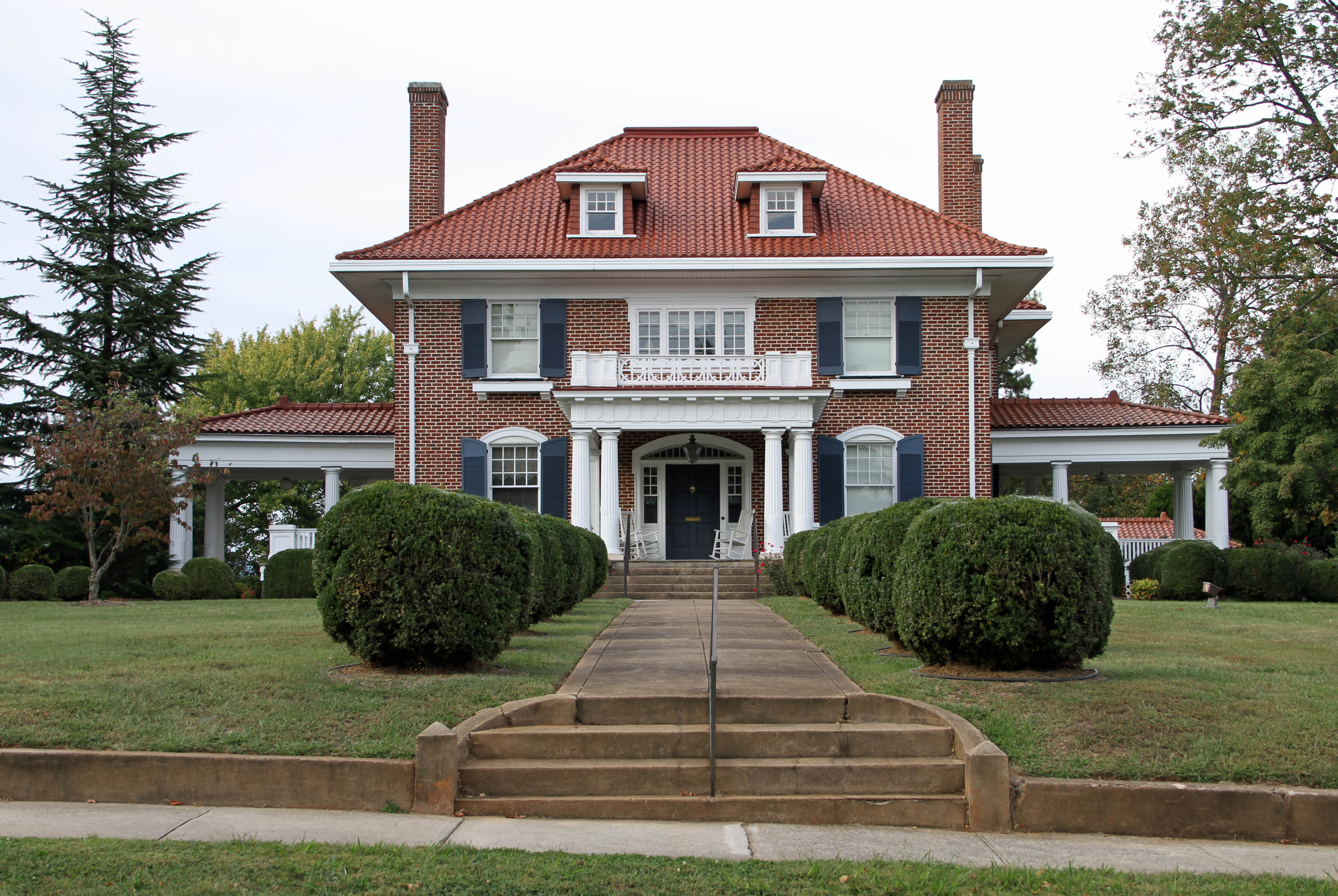

- Location within Virginia Location within the United States
- Location: 525 Longwood Ave., Bedford, Virginia
- Coordinates: 37°20′21″N 79°31′13″W
- Area: 1.8 acres (0.73 ha)
- Built: 1915
- Architect: Johnson, Stanhope S.; McLaoughlin & Johnson
- Architectural style: Colonial Revival
- NRHP reference No.: 97001505
- VLR No.: 141-0014

Significant dates
- Added to NRHP: December 12, 1997
- Designated VLR: September 17, 1997

John D. Ballard House, also known as the Ballard-Worsham House, is a historic home located at Bedford, Virginia. It was designed by noted Lynchburg architect Stanhope S. Johnson and built in 1915. It is a two-story, brick dwelling in the Colonial Revival style. It has a steep deck-on-hip roof with terra cotta Spanish roofing tiles, a formal front facade with segmentally arched windows, and a one-story front portico, with grouped Doric order columns. Also on the property is a contributing meat house / tool shed.

It was listed on the National Register of Historic Places in 1997. It is located in the Bedford Historic District.
