= Pleasant View (Forest, Virginia) =

Historic house in Virginia, United States

- U.S. National Register of Historic Places
- Virginia Landmarks Register
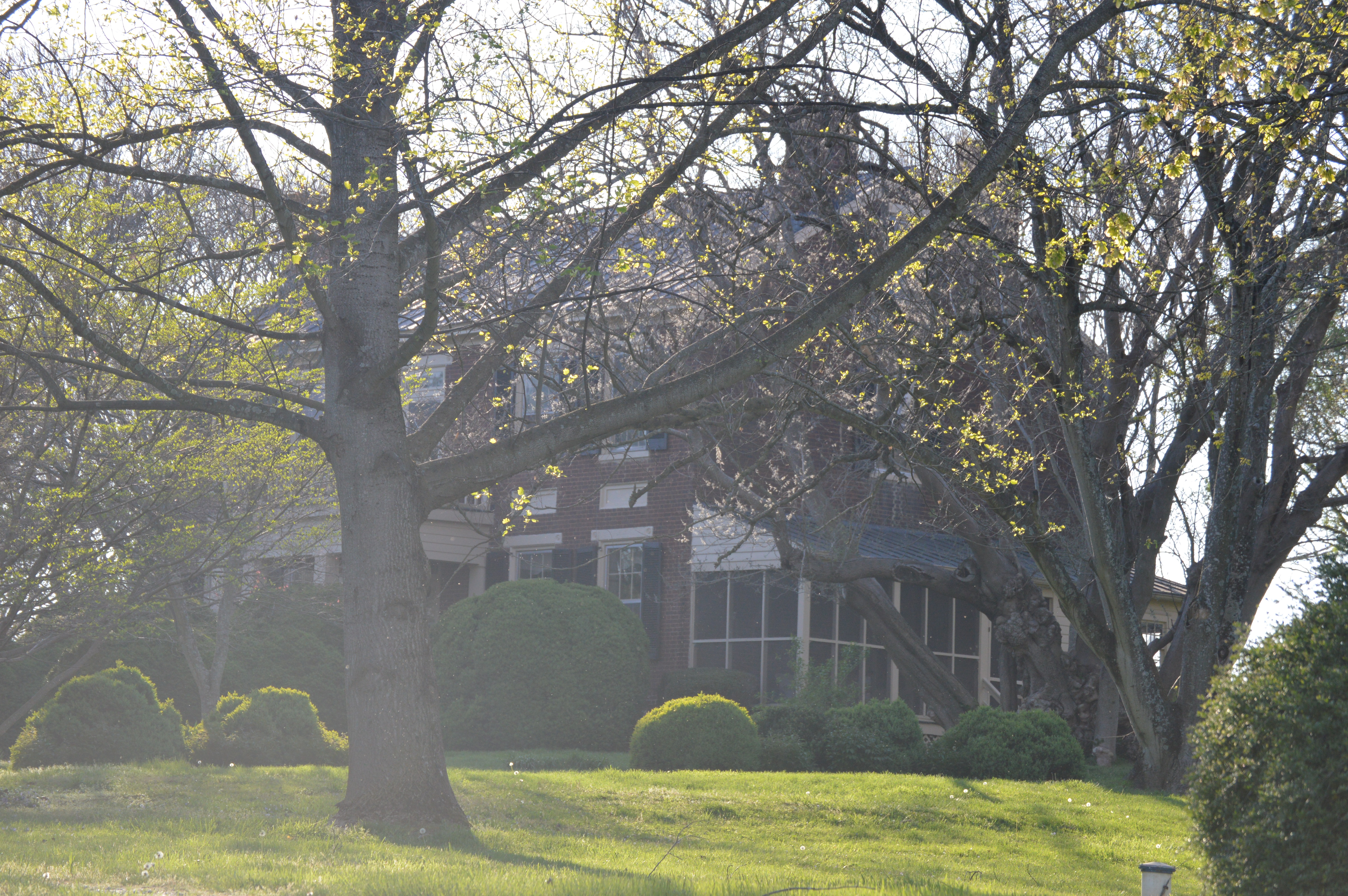
- Roadside view of the house

- Location within Virginia Location within the United States
- Location: 5050 Bellevue Rd., west of Forest, Virginia
- Coordinates: 37°20′53″N 79°21′46″W
- Area: 18.1 acres (7.3 ha)
- Built: c. 1840
- Architectural style: Classical Revival, Greek Revival
- NRHP reference No.: 06001043
- VLR No.: 009-0207

Significant dates
- Added to NRHP: November 15, 2006
- Designated VLR: September 6, 2006

Pleasant View is a historic home located near Forest, Bedford County, Virginia. It was built about 1840, and is a two-story, five-bay, brick dwelling in the Classical Revival style. It features Greek Revival style decorative details, front doors on both the first and second floors, plastered recessed panels between the floor levels, and a typical side-gable roof with wood cornice. Also on the property are a contributing late-19th century frame smokehouse, the remaining half of a "saddlebag" kitchen/quarters building, and a family cemetery.

It was listed on the National Register of Historic Places in 2006.
