= Avenel (Bedford, Virginia) =

Historic house in Virginia, US

- U.S. National Register of Historic Places
- U.S. Historic district – Contributing property
- Virginia Landmarks Register
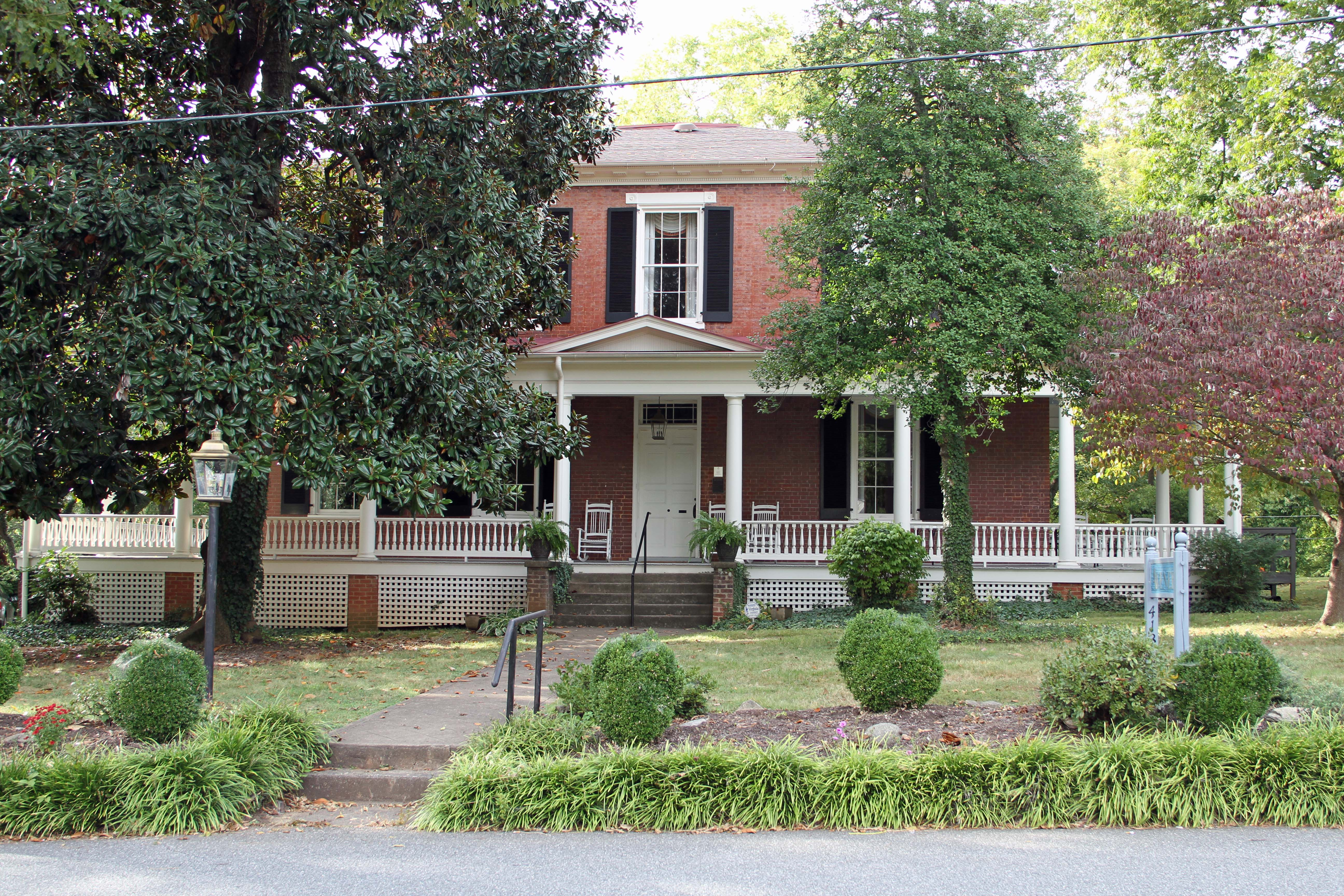
- Avenel, September 2012

- Location within Virginia Location within the United States
- Location: 413 Avenel Ave., Bedford, Virginia
- Coordinates: 37°20′16″N 79°31′29″W
- Area: 3.3 acres (1.3 ha)
- Built: c. 1836
- Architectural style: Greek Revival, Federal
- NRHP reference No.: 92000003
- VLR No.: 141-0001

Significant dates
- Added to NRHP: January 30, 1992
- Designated VLR: December 11, 1991

Avenel, also known as the William M. Burwell House, is a historic home located at Bedford, Virginia and now open to the public by appointment.

== History ==
Built about 1836, the two-story, brick dwelling displays a blend of Federal and Greek Revival styling. It is topped by a hipped roof and has a one-story wraparound porch. Also on the property are a contributing smokehouse, hen house, a frame 19th-century barn, and site of a kitchen building. It and the surrounding 250 acres were operated as a plantation using enslaved labor by William M. Burwell, who Bedford County voters ten times elected as one of their representatives to the Virginia House of Delegates, and whose father William A. Burwell had represented the area in the U.S. House of Representatives, as well as served as a private secretary for President Thomas Jefferson. Burwell's eldest daughter, Letitia M. Burwell (1831-1905) wrote two books in the Lost Cause tradition, the second, A Girl's Life in Virginia Before the War. She inherited the house, and attempted to bequeath it to the children of her two married sisters, but legal problems led to the property being sold to another family. "The Lady in White" or the "White Lady of Avenel", is the most commonly reported apparition at Avenel. The apparition is thought to be Mary Frances "Fran" Burwell. "The legend has it that she stayed on the front porch waiting for her husband to come home from the Civil War, but he never did." says Adam Sutphin, founder of SouthWest Virginia Ghost Hunters.

It was listed on the National Register of Historic Places in 1992. It is located in the Bedford Historic District.
