= Hope Dawn =

Historic house in Virginia, United States

- U.S. National Register of Historic Places
- Virginia Landmarks Register
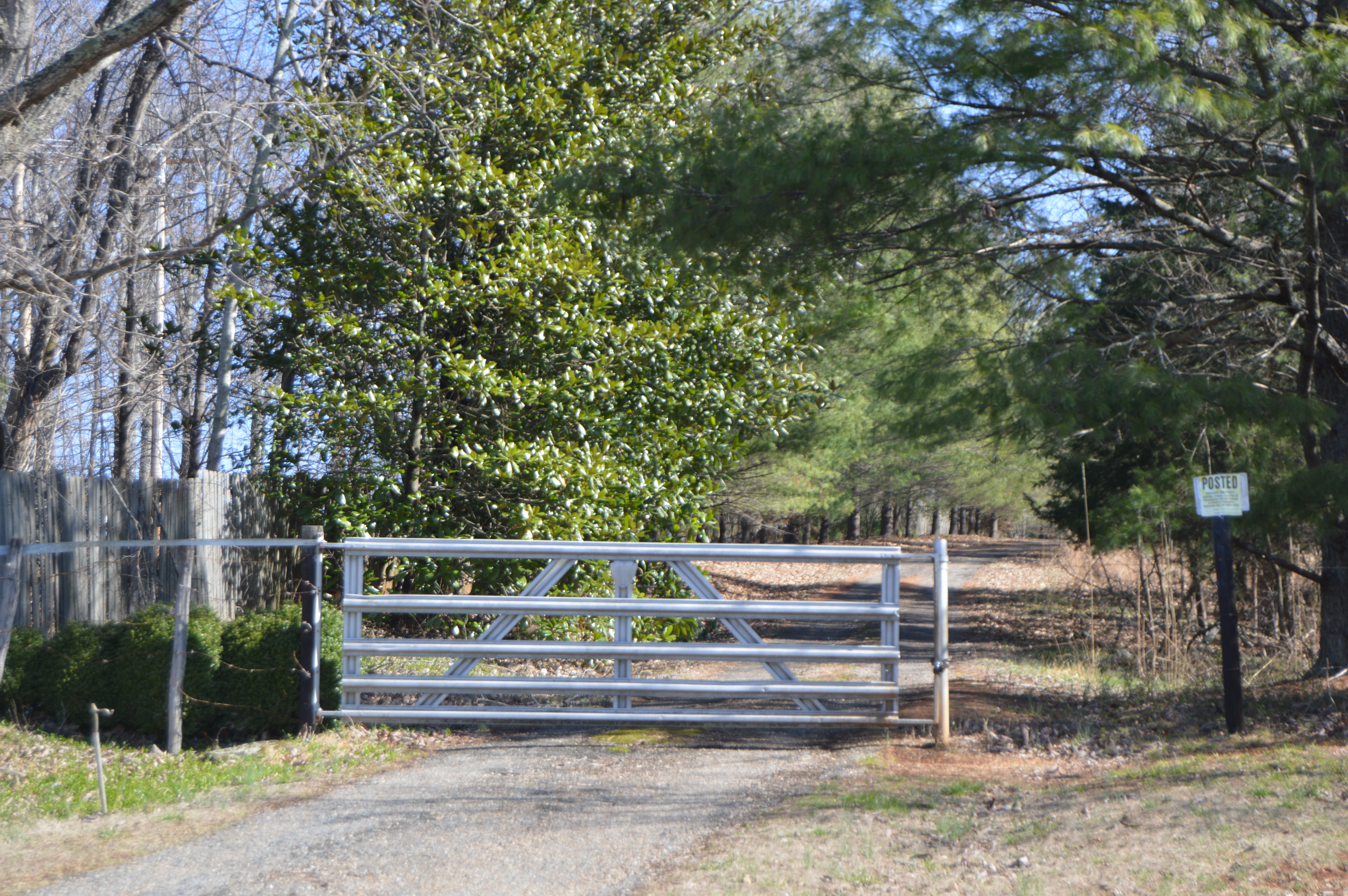
- Entrance

- Location within Virginia Location within the United States
- Location: Off Abert Road, northwest of Lynchburg, Virginia
- Coordinates: 37°30′00″N 79°13′53″W
- Area: 225 acres (91 ha)
- Built: c. 1827
- Architectural style: Federal
- NRHP reference No.: 74002106
- VLR No.: 009-0043

Significant dates
- Added to NRHP: October 9, 1974
- Designated VLR: September 17, 1974

Hope Dawn is a historic home located near Lynchburg, Bedford County, Virginia. It was built about 1827, and is a 1 1/2-story, brick Federal-style farmhouse. It consists of a three bay main block and one bay south wing. The walls are laid in Flemish bond with scattered glazed headers and penciled joints. It has a standing seam metal gable roof. Also on the property are a contributing old stone and brick stable that has been remodeled into a guesthouse, a simple stone structure that served variously as a distillery and a chicken house, and a frame office.

It was listed on the National Register of Historic Places in 1974.
