= Bowling Eldridge House =

Historic house in Virginia, United States

- U.S. National Register of Historic Places
- Virginia Landmarks Register
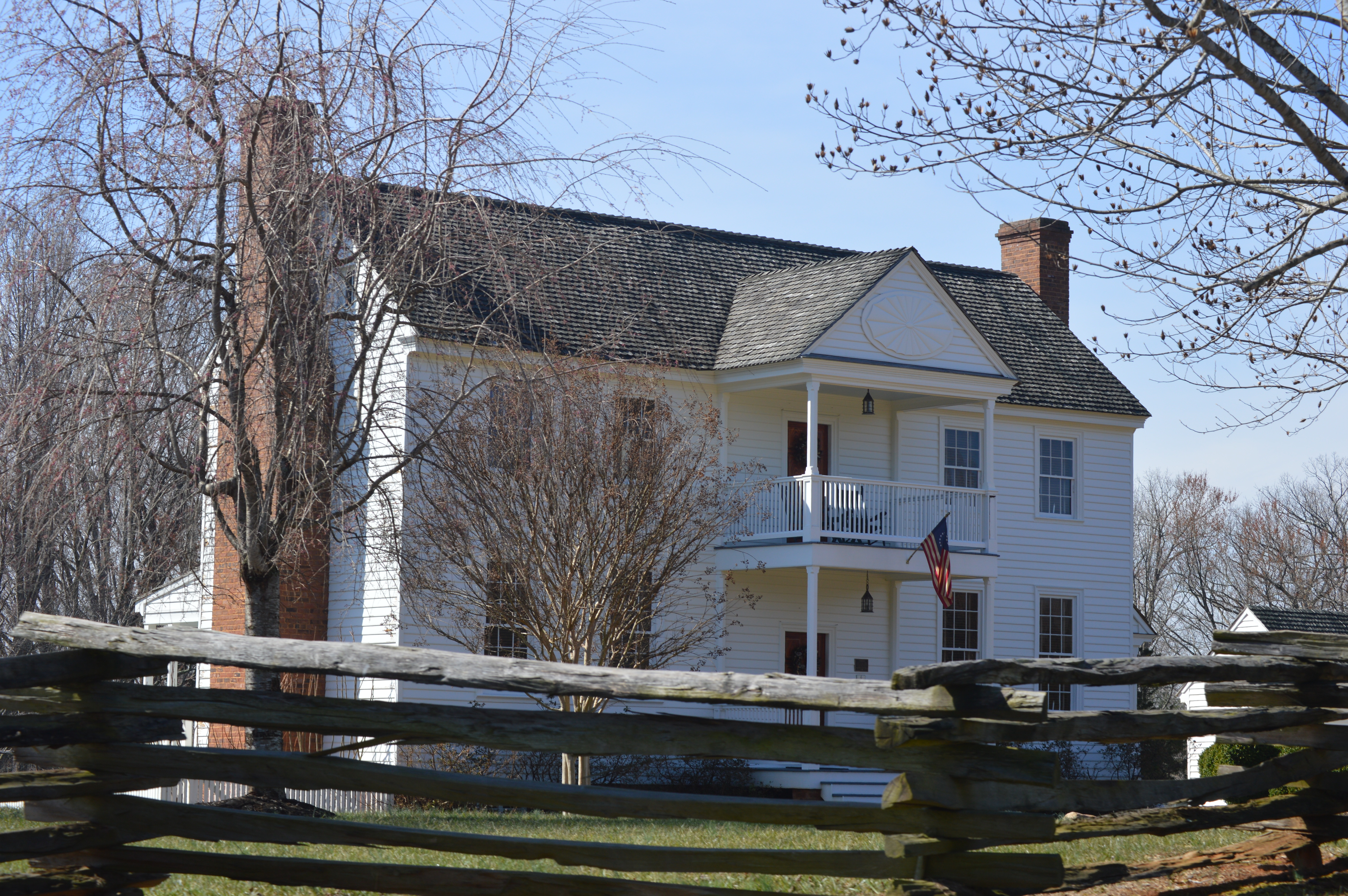
- Front and eastern side of the house

- Location within Virginia Location within the United States
- Location: 1651 Fox Hill Rd., near Lynchburg, Virginia
- Coordinates: 37°28′22″N 79°12′03″W
- Area: 0.4 acres (0.16 ha)
- Built: c. 1822-1828
- Architectural style: Federal
- NRHP reference No.: 93000824
- VLR No.: 009-5283

Significant dates
- Added to NRHP: August 12, 1993
- Designated VLR: June 16, 1993

The Bowling Eldridge House, also known as Ridgecrest, stands as a historic plantation house located near Lynchburg, within Bedford County, Virginia. Erected over the span of six years from 1822 to 1828, this dwelling boasts a two-story, five-bay structure crafted using mortise-and-tenon frame construction techniques. Its architectural elements include a gable roof adorned with metal sheathing, exterior gable-end brick chimneys, a brick foundation, and weatherboard siding characterized by beaded detailing. An integral or earlier two-story ell featuring an exterior gable-end brick chimney and a pent room complements the main structure. Both the interior and exterior exhibit prominent Federal influences and detailing.

It was listed on the National Register of Historic Places in 1993. The house was originally listed in Halifax County, Virginia.
