= Poplar Forest =

Plantation and historic house in Forest, Bedford County, VA, US

- U.S. National Register of Historic Places
- U.S. National Historic Landmark
- Virginia Landmarks Register
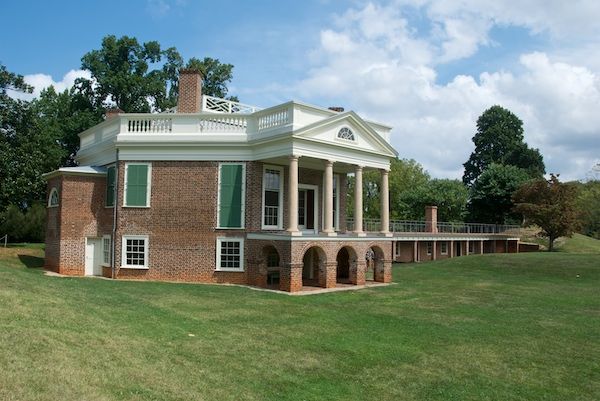
- Poplar Forest, designed by Thomas Jefferson

- Location within Virginia Location within the United States
- Interactive map showing the location of Poplar Forest
- Location: 1776 Poplar Forest Parkway, Lynchburg, Virginia
- Coordinates: 37°20′53.736″N 79°15′53.8194″W
- Built: 1806–1826
- Architect: Thomas Jefferson
- Website: www.poplarforest.org
- NRHP reference No.: 69000223 (original); 100012286 (increase)
- VLR No.: 009-0027

Significant dates
- Added to NRHP: November 12, 1969
- Boundary increase: September 24, 2025
- Designated NHL: November 11, 1971
- Designated VLR: May 13, 1969

Poplar Forest is a plantation and retreat home in Forest, Virginia, United States, that belonged to Thomas Jefferson, Founding Father and third U.S. president. Jefferson inherited the property in 1773 and began designing and working on his retreat home in 1806. While Jefferson is the most famous individual associated with the property, it had several owners before being purchased for restoration, preservation, and exhibition in 1984.

Poplar Forest was designated as a National Historic Landmark in 1971 and is now operated as a historic house museum by the nonprofit Corporation for Jefferson's Poplar Forest. The corporation is also responsible for the ongoing archaeological study and restoration work at the property. The Corporation celebrated the completed restoration of Jefferson's villa retreat in April 2023.

== History ==
The land upon which Poplar Forest was built shows archaeological evidence of having been populated by native peoples from the Paleo-Indian through Late Woodland periods. The 4,000-acre property was legally defined by a 1745 patent in which William Stith (a colonial minister and planter) assumed ownership, but did not live on the land. He passed ownership to his daughter Elizabeth Pasteur who sold it to her cousin Peter Randolph, who maintained ownership until 1764. John Wayles purchased the original property in 1764 and slowly added an additional 819 acres prior to 1770; he was the first to use slave labor on the property. Similar to Stith, Wayles did not live on the property due to his career as an attorney and businessman in Charles City County, Virginia.

Thomas Jefferson by Thomas Sully, 1821, painted around the time that Poplar Forest was constructed.

Wayles' daughter Martha Wayles Skelton was married to Thomas Jefferson, and the couple inherited the full 4,819 acres when Wayles died in 1773. The Jeffersons did not immediately continue developing Poplar Forest, nor were they frequent visitors to the property – their focus was on developing Monticello, Thomas's political and legal career, and raising their family. Martha Jefferson died in 1782, and Thomas spent time away from Virginia in public service following her death, serving as Minister to France (1785–1789), Secretary of State (1790–1793), Vice President (1797–1801), and President (1801–1809).

Even in Jefferson's absence, the plantation was generating revenue from slave labor under the watch of a general steward and a team of overseers; the slave labor force at Poplar Forest produced annual tobacco and wheat crops after 1790.

Jefferson conducted annual visits to Poplar Forest beginning in 1810 and ending in 1823; He frequently brought his granddaughters Ellen and Cornelia Jefferson Randolph to the house after 1816, and always traveled to Poplar Forest with a small cadre of enslaved men and women who were based at Monticello. His visits ranged from a few days to weeklong stays. Jefferson maintained sole ownership of the property and the slaves until 1790, when he gave 1,000 acres and six slave families to his daughter Martha and her husband Thomas Mann Randolph Jr. Randolph would later divide and sell the rest of Jefferson's landholdings; he also sold many of Jefferson's enslaved persons to repay debts.

Near the end of his life, Jefferson sought to find permanent residents for the property, and his grandson Francis W. Eppes and wife Mary Elizabeth moved to Poplar Forest shortly after their 1823 marriage. Jefferson died in 1826 having made his last visit to Poplar Forest in 1823. The Eppeses sold Poplar Forest in November 1828 to William Cobbs; Cobbs assigned the task of managing the property to his son-in-law Edward Hutter in 1840 following his marriage to Cobb's daughter Emma. The period from 1745 to 1840, in which Poplar Forest was sold many times in quick succession many enslaved men, women, and children were separated from their families as the owners settled their predecessor's debts. The Cobbs–Hutter family maintained ownership of Poplar Forest into the twentieth century. The Hutter's son Christian purchased the property in the late nineteenth century and used it as a summer home and working farm into the 1940s employing labor from both black and white hired farmhands and tenant farmers.

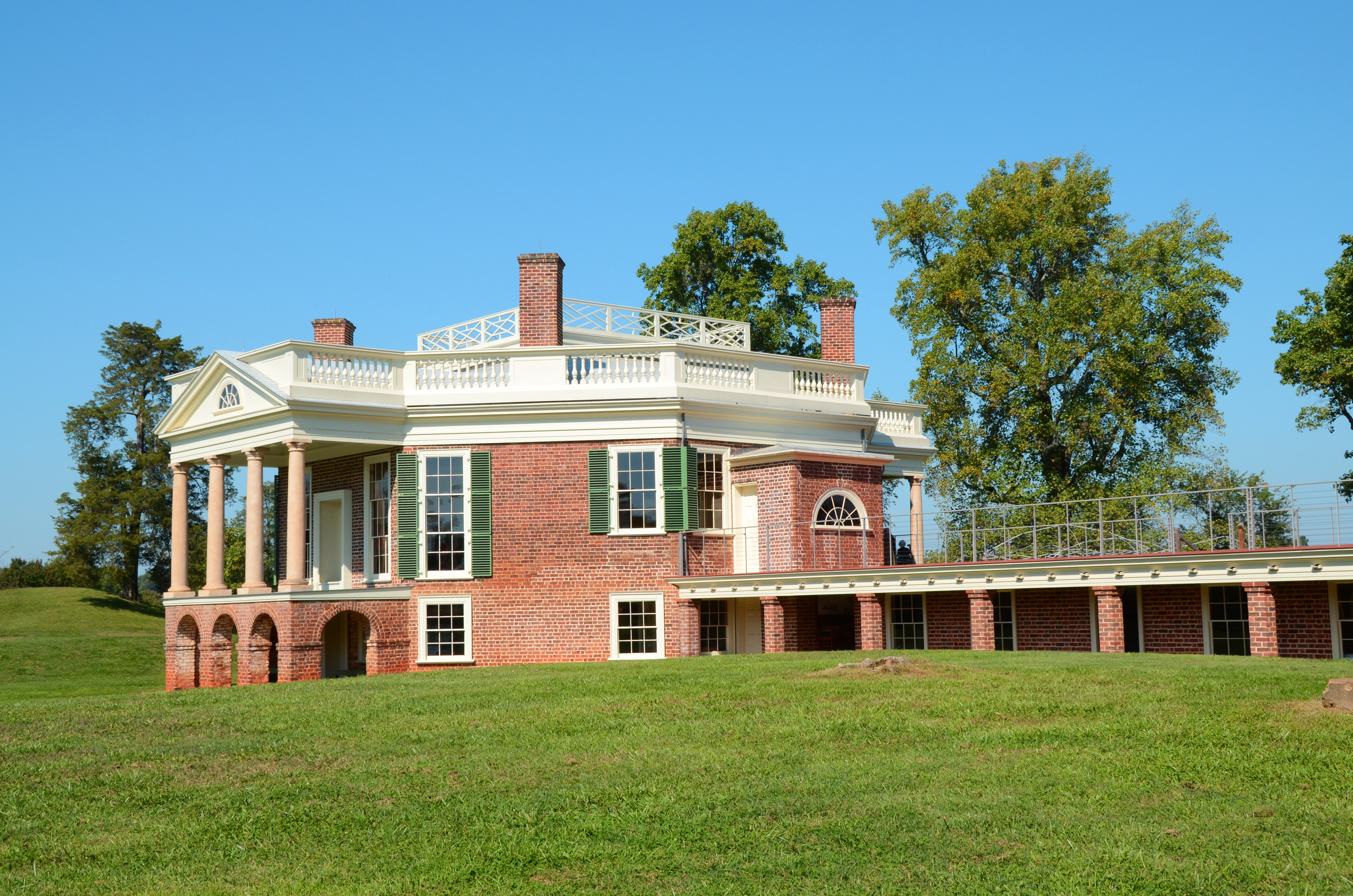
Poplar Forest in 2011

Christian Hutter sold the property to James Watts’ family in 1946; the Watts family operated Poplar Forest as a dairy farm and worked with Phelps Barnum and W. Stuart Thompson to restore the house to the way it appeared during Jefferson's time. They also did significant landscape development, and sold a majority of the remaining land to a developer who constructed a nine-hole golf course and a lake along the eastern and southern part of the property.

Dr. James Johnson purchased the house and 50 acres of land from the Watts family in 1980 and then the nonprofit Corporation for Jefferson's Poplar Forest purchased the acreage and the remaining physical structures on the property in 1984. The organization has worked in recent years to reacquire land within the original plantation boundaries, and as of 2008 owned 617 acres of the original property. The Corporation celebrated the completed restoration of Jefferson's villa retreat in April 2023.

== Architectural design ==
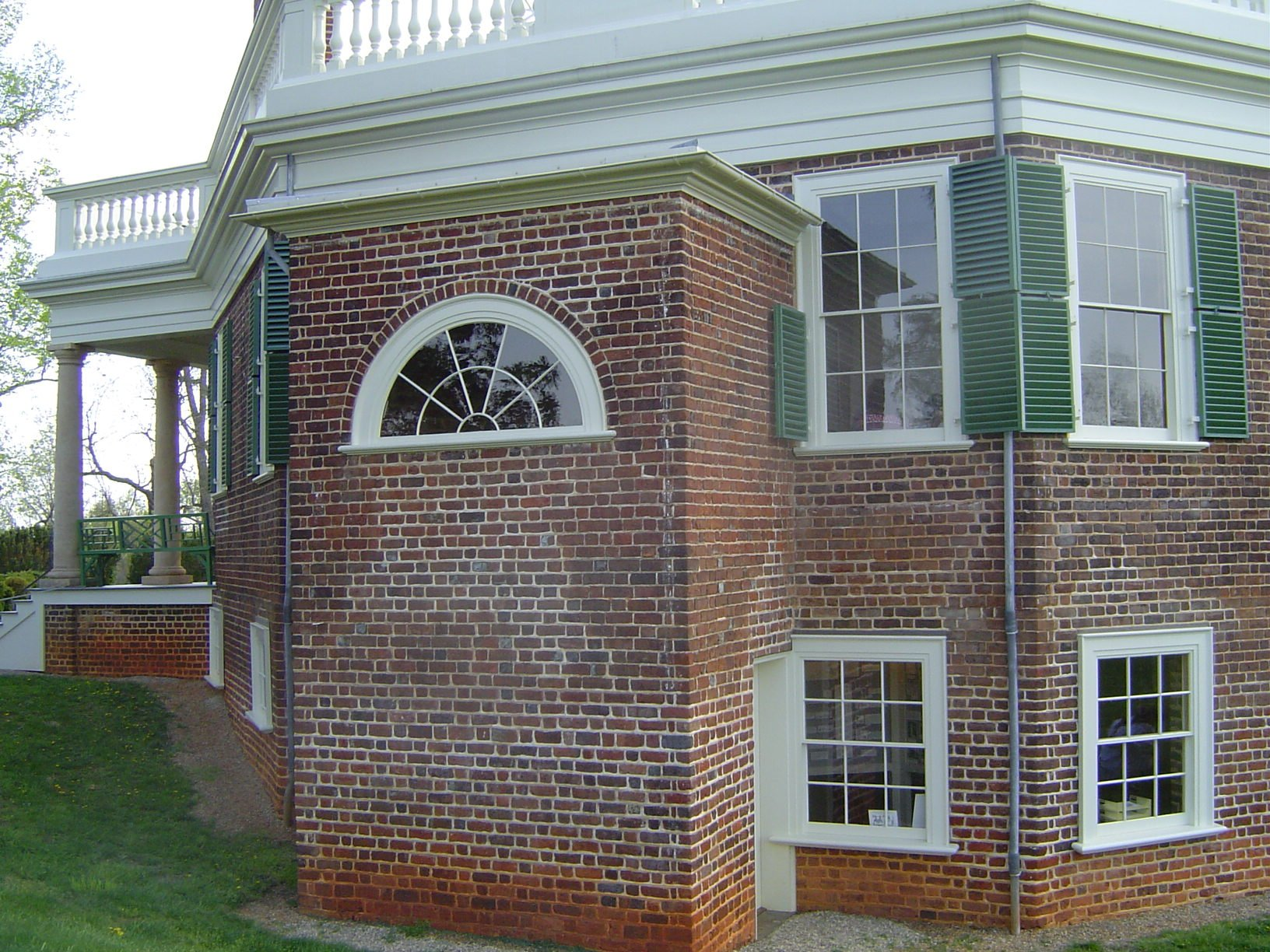
East elevation of Poplar Forest (2004)

When construction began at Poplar Forest in 1806, Jefferson was President of the United States. He supervised the construction from Washington, D.C. Thomas Jefferson was a self-taught architect known for his work at Monticello and the Virginia State Capitol; he frequently borrowed designs from classical sources, and was attracted to Palladio's classical architecture in the Veneto as well as designs from 16th century France. Jefferson designed Poplar Forest as his personal retreat house and selected the property because of its distance from his public life.

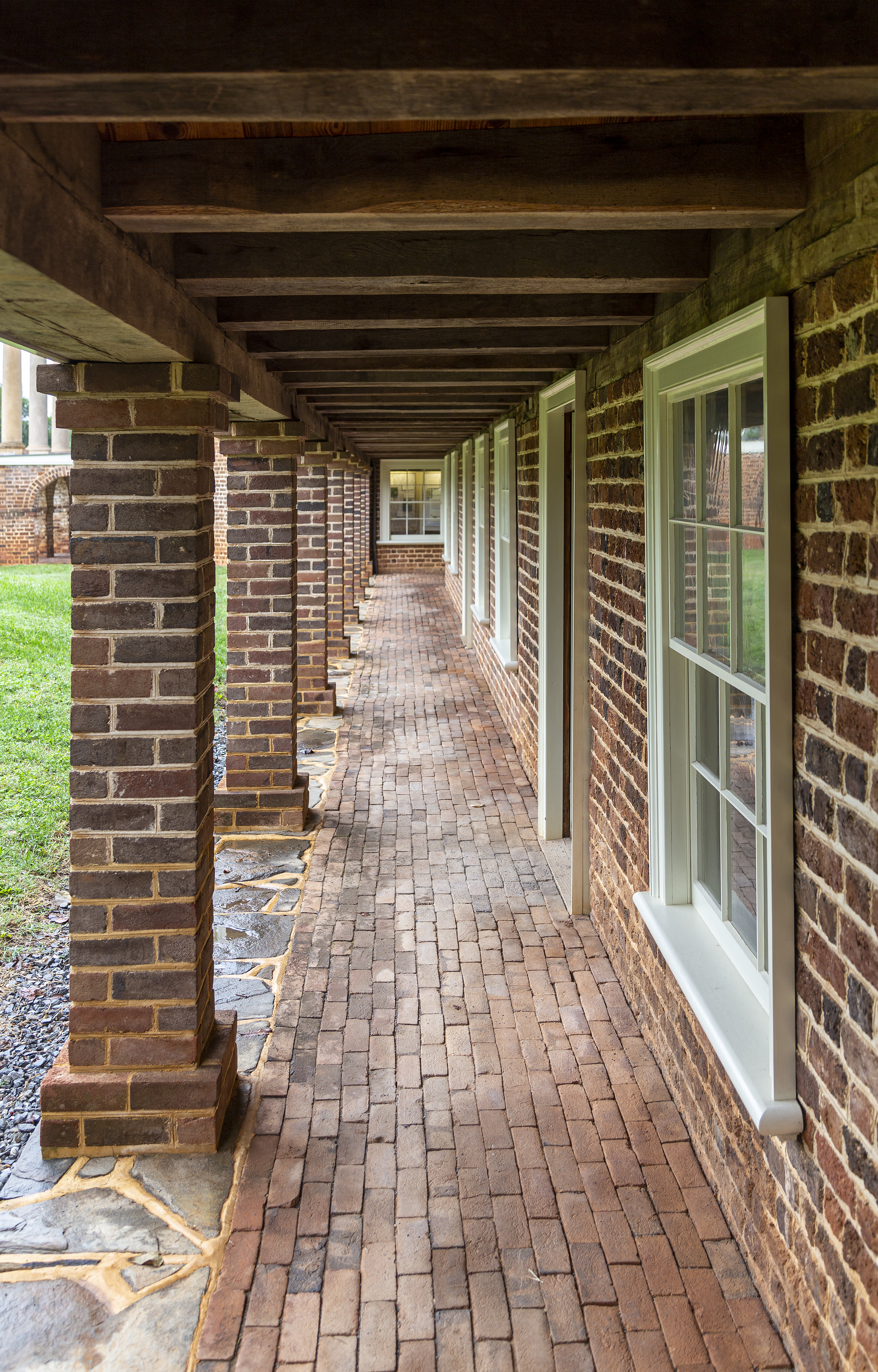
View along one of the wings, Poplar Forest, near Lynchburg, Virginia, USA

The octagonal house may have been the first of its kind to have been built in the United States. The house at Poplar Forest is made of brick and has an octagonal floor plan. The main floor’s plan has a central square space (dining room) with elongated octagon rooms on three sides. The house’s entry is on the fourth (northern) side of the central room where an entry hall, which is centered on the facade, divides two smaller rooms. There is a skylight in the central dining room. The dining room dimensions are 20’ x 20’ x 20’, which makes it a perfect cube. Jefferson also designed pedimented porticoes on low arcades that were centered on both the northern and southern facades as well as the east and west stairwells. Scholars agree that the retreat house at Poplar Forest is an excellent example of octagonal symmetry; Jefferson's design for the building reflects a consistent geometric approach likely made possible by his well-known proficiency in algebra, geometry, trigonometry, and Newtonian calculus.

== Post-Jeffersonian modifications and preservation ==
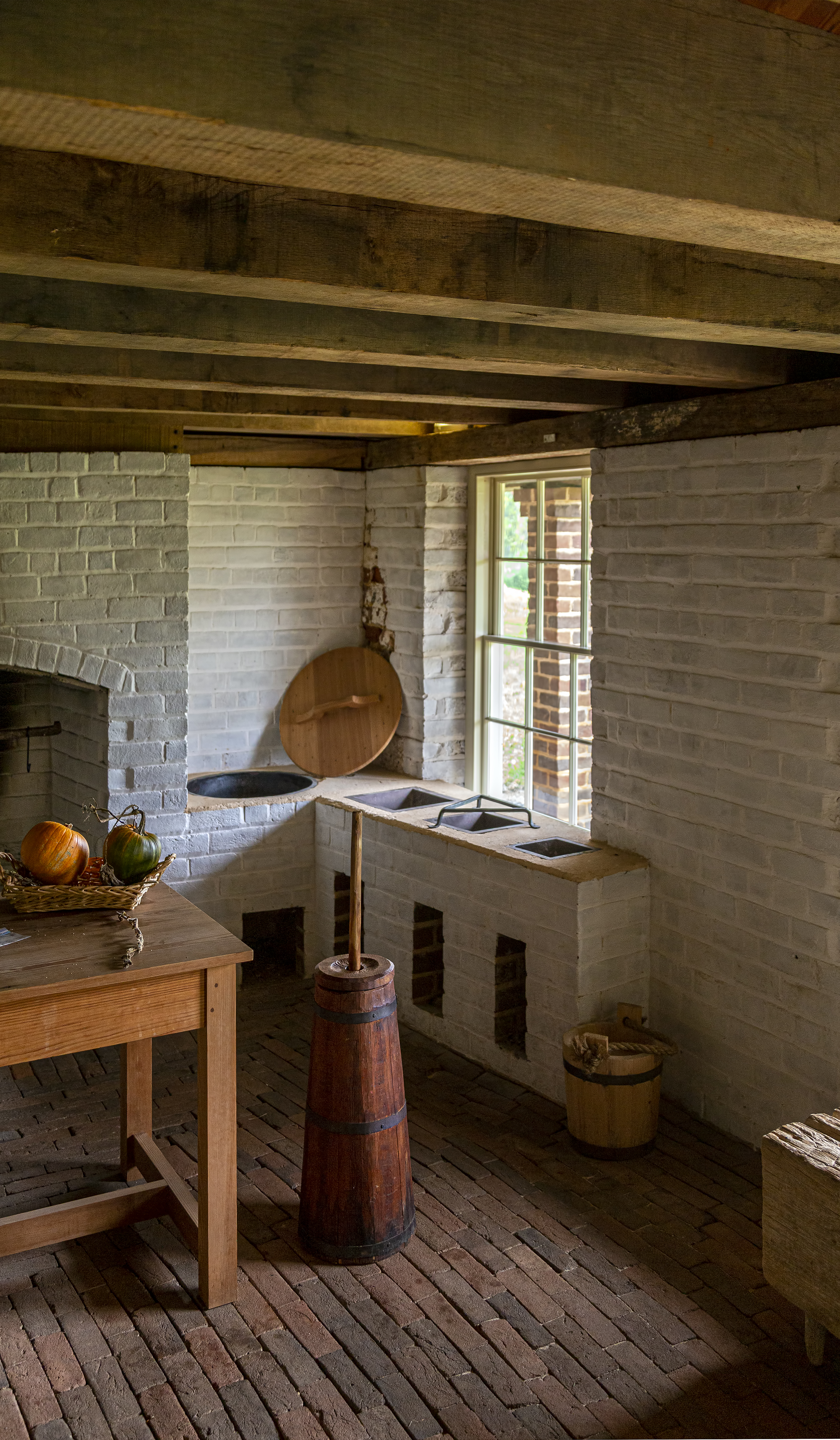
Hearths in the kitchen at Poplar Forest, near Lynchburg, Virginia, USA

Under different owners, the main house underwent many alterations, and the plantation's acreage was incrementally reduced to 50 acres (20 ha) at the time of acquisition by the Corporation for Jefferson's Poplar Forest. There was a fire in 1845; the Cobbs and Hutter families rebuilt in the Greek revival style and added an attic story for sleeping; this modified the interior plan of the house. The original walls, chimney, and columns remained after the renovation.

The Corporation for Jefferson's Poplar Forest used early 19th-century building materials including heavy timber-frame construction, hemp sash cord, and iron hardware from Colonial Williamsburg. They also used 19th-century building techniques, such as column rendering and burning limestone to produce traditional lime mortar and plaster, for their restoration work. The goal of the restorations is to restore Poplar Forest to Jefferson's original architectural vision.

== Slavery ==
Enslaved men, women, and children were present on the property from 1766 through 1865, when slavery was formally abolished in the United States. Present-day knowledge of the enslaved populations and their contributions to Poplar Forest is based on both archaeological and archival evidence. John Wayles used slave labor to originally develop roadwork on the property, and when Thomas and Martha Jefferson inherited the land that included Poplar Forest from Wayles, they also inherited 135 enslaved men, women, and children as well as other tracts of land in Amherst, Cumberland, Charles City, Goochland, and Powhatan counties. Because Wayles chose to split his estate among several heirs, enslaved families were separated in order for his heirs to pay his debts.

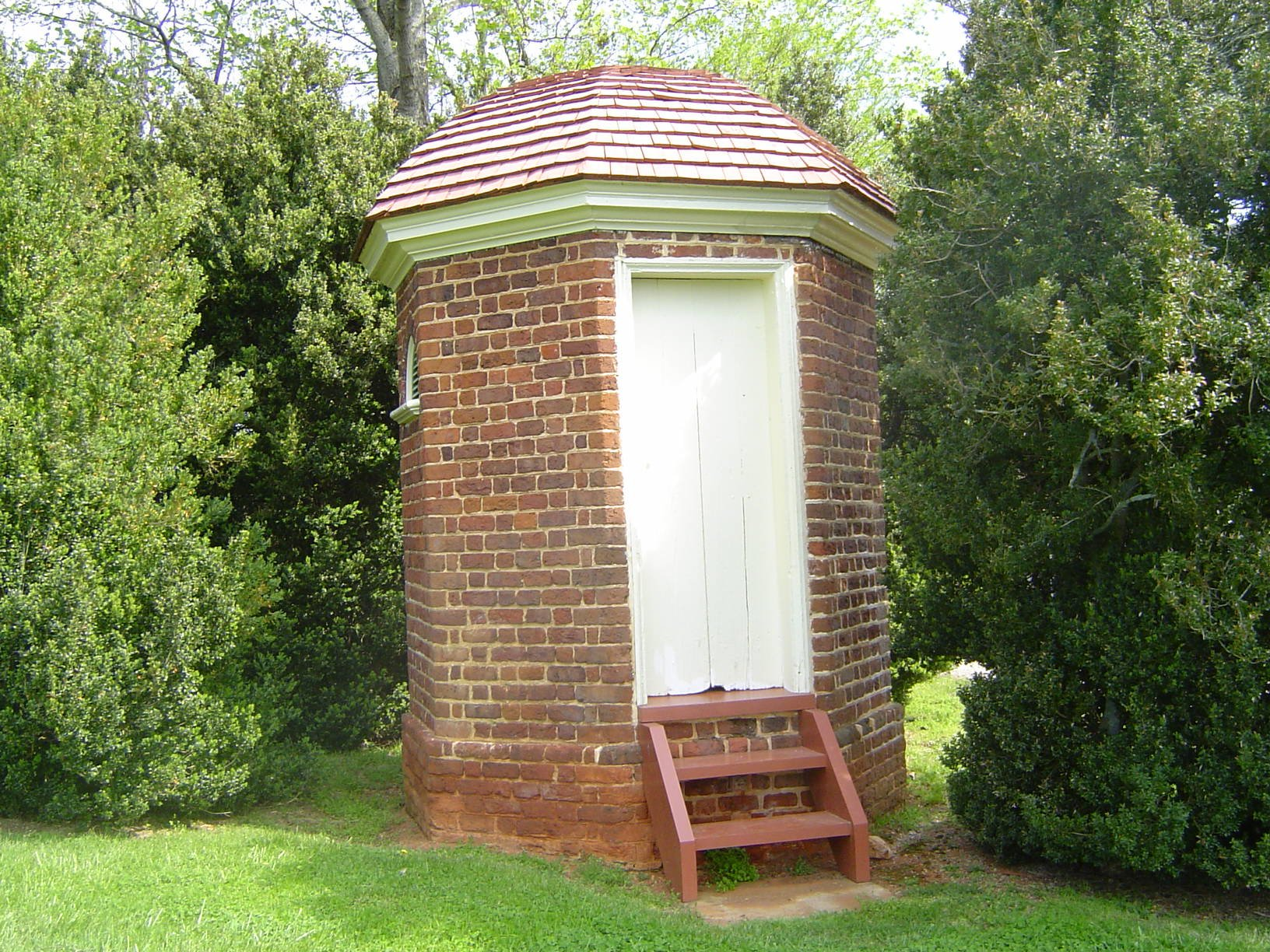
Privy

North–south section

As Jefferson turned more attention to Poplar Forest, he brought enslaved people from Monticello, Elk Hill, Indian Camp, and Judith's Creek, thus increasing the enslaved population at Poplar Forest. Jefferson kept consistent records of the enslaved people living at Poplar Forest; these records show that the enslaved population fluctuated between as few as 28 and as many as 95 enslaved individuals were working at Poplar Forest between the years 1774 and 1819. As an active participant in the slave trade, Jefferson sold and purchased enslaved people throughout the time he owned Poplar Forest, including the sale of 40 enslaved people from his various properties in Bedford County, Virginia in the 1790s. The Eppeses inherited the house, about 1,075 acres of land, and several enslaved men and women after Jefferson's death in 1826. The Cobbs and Hutter families also used slave labor on the property through emancipation and maintained some formerly enslaved people as hired workers following.

=== Plantation and slave economics ===
Beginning in 1790, the enslaved community at Poplar Forest grew tobacco and livestock for profit, and later grew wheat. Records from Edward Hutter's tenure at Poplar Forest show that enslaved individuals were regularly tasked with tilling fields and digging ditches in addition to their work growing and harvesting plants to be sold at market. Enslaved people worked six days each week, and were also responsible for constructing and maintaining their housing structures. Scholars have determined that the enslaved community at Poplar Forest devised a commerce system amongst themselves; enslaved persons were allowed a small plot of land on which to grow food, producing goods that could be traded or sold to fellow enslaved people as well as the owners' families and the outside market. Archaeologists at Poplar Forest have uncovered clothing accessories such as buttons, glass beads, gilt chains, aiglet/lace tips, and fancy buckles that were likely used as currency amongst enslaved people at Poplar Forest and the surrounding plantations.

Documents from the 19th century show that the transition from tobacco-based to mixed-crop plantation agriculture left Poplar Forest with an abundance of laborers; William Cobbs, in particular, is known to have hired out enslaved people from the plantation to external projects. Other enslaved individuals (including two women named Lucy and Matilda) are known to have had access to money during this time so that they could buy items on behalf of the Cobbs/Hutter families. Edward Hutter regularly leased slaves from Poplar Forest to businesses and planters in Bedford County.

=== Family networks ===
Records show that by the 1790s, there were seven different enslaved families represented at Poplar Forest. Jefferson encouraged common-law unions amongst the enslaved community, and recorded the birth dates of each enslaved child born on the property. He also rewarded women who married a fellow slave from Poplar Forest with a pot; archaeologists have found remnants of these gifts in archaeological studies of the property. Jefferson kept records of family connections – surviving records have allowed scholars to conclude that multiple generations of single families were enslaved at Poplar Forest and had relatives at other plantations in Virginia. William and Marian Cobbs inherited an enslaved family that included Mary and her daughters Lucy and Matilda (who are recorded to have worked as house slaves) as well as other siblings and extended family members.

=== Known enslaved people ===
- Hannah was not born at Poplar Forest, but served there from the time she was a teenager until ca.1821. She married and had a family with a fellow slave, was literate, and worked for a time as Jefferson's housekeeper.
- James (Jame) Hubbard was purchased by Jefferson when he was 30 and went on to oversee field laborers at Poplar Forest. He fathered six children with a fellow slave named Cate and fostered several others, and worked as a hogkeeper when he was older. Scholars are also able to trace his family members and their roles at Poplar Forest, which included Nace, Hannah, Nancy, Joan, James, and Phill.
- Phill was born at Poplar Forest to James Hubbard and his wife Cate. Phill briefly worked at Monticello before returning to Poplar Forest, where he married Hanah and had a son. He died at age 33, reportedly of poisoning.
- William (Billy) was born at Poplar Forest and violently rebelled against slavery by attacking an overseer on more than one occasion. Jefferson sent him and three others to Louisiana, where William attempted to run away, but was caught and sold.
- John Hemmings never lived at Poplar Forest, but documentary records show that he was responsible for much of the interior woodwork in the retreat house at Poplar Forest.
- Lydia Johnson lived at Poplar Forest when Edward Hutter owned the property. She named one of her children Ida Reeder, after Hutter's niece; expense records show that he purchased a dress for her as a gift. Lydia continued to work for the family after Emancipation until she died in 1919.
- Will appears in a ledger from 1772 noting that he purchased rum, buttons, thread, and cloth.

== Archaeology ==
There have been several archaeological digs at Poplar Forest since the archaeology program began in 1989. Archaeology has revealed several sites associated with the enslaved population at Poplar Forest as well as uncovered valuable information about Jefferson's original landscape surrounding his retreat. In Fall of 2022, Poplar Forest celebrated the completion of landscape restoration to the north side of the retreat villa.

More recent excavations focused on an area believed to have held paper mulberry trees; Jefferson planted two rows in order to help create naturalistic wings to complement the Palladian style of his retreat house. Archaeologists at Poplar Forest found stains in the ground indicating areas in which trees were previously planted, and their goal is to analyze the levels of charcoal and pollen to determine which areas were most likely the original location(s) for the paper mulberry trees. Other ongoing and future excavation plans include the area surrounding an antebellum slave cabin as well as Jefferson's ornamental plant nursery.

=== Slave sites ===
Archaeological excavations of Poplar Forest have yielded evidence suggesting that maps of Poplar Forest created in Jefferson's time were incomplete and did not illustrate the extent to which enslaved people were present.

==== Old Plantation/North Hill site ====
The Old Plantation/North Hill is believed to have been established in the 1770s/1780s and was the site of the oldest slave farm structures at Poplar Forest dating from 1764. Maps suggest that the original structures included an overseer's house, large barn, and slave housing built over the course of 40 years. Scholars also refer to this area as the Old Quarter located to the south and west of the main house.

==== Quarter site ====
The Quarter site, also called the Wingo quarter farm, dates from 1790 to 1812 at Poplar Forest and was operational when Jefferson owned Poplar Forest; he gave the land on which it was located to Martha and Thomas Mann Randolph as a wedding present. Jefferson's surviving notes tell us that three carpenters were able to construct a slave cabin in three days and that the slaves most often lived next to their field or shop work sites. Documentary evidence suggests that the slave housing structures at Poplar Forest were made of logs and that several houses had two rooms that each measured 12.5 × 15 feet; this is corroborated by archaeological evidence suggesting that the slave structures contained root cellars designed by the occupants, which were used to store clothing, tools, and iron hardware. Archaeologists used soil stains to discover storage pits, burned tree roots, and postholes; this analysis also yielded fragments of glass, ceramics, and iron which were discovered to have been parts of plates, bottles, and cooking pots.

One other structure discovered is believed to have functioned as a smokehouse as well as a residence, while a third is believed to have been built later than the other two, and used primarily as housing. Soil analysis also suggests that there were fences in the slave quarters.

Excavations at this site also yielded a number of objects related to slave life at Poplar Forest. Archaeologists discovered iron saw files, gimlets, wedges, croze irons, and a hinge from a folding ruler; it is likely that these objects are from tools used by slaves either in their work assignments or in their personal space. Scissors, straight pins, and thimbles found at the site suggest that women sewed for both work and for their families. The excavations uncovered stoneware and earthenware that scholars believe to have been used to prepare food. Enslaved men and women at Poplar Forest ate fruits and vegetables as well as beef, pork, venison, opossum, rabbit, chicken, turkey, and fish, and possibly had access to firearms with which to hunt animals.

==== Site A ====
This is the newest of the three sites; current scholarship indicates that it was built in the 1830s and was operational until emancipation. Scholars believe that the site was home to a slave cabin likely occupied between 1840 and 1860. Archaeologists have uncovered a 3 ft. pit that would have been located underneath the floor of the cabin, postholes, and remnants of a shone chimney. The excavation at Site A has yielded buttons, straight pins, needles, thimbles, and the bone cap of a needle case; this suggests that this site may have been the home of a seamstress.

In addition, 191 beads have been recovered, with only one made of bone, and the rest from glass. 159 were seed beads, most predominantly found in aqua, turquoise, red and white cased, and white. Though five single beads in dark blue, light blue, black, dark green, and purple were also uncovered, as well as two light green, and four colorless seed beads. The residual thirty one beads were crafted from different glass bead making methods, and were found in three colors. Twenty six were wound glass in black, three were faceted, two black and one purple, and two drawn glass in white.

A Spanish half real had also been excavated, pierced at the top. Beginning in 1765, Spanish reales were standard currency in Virginia, and were considered legal tender from 1793 to 1857 in the United States as a whole. Though, considering the recovered half real was found altered, it suggests that the real was worn as an adornment object. Historically, both pierced and unpierced coins were worn for protection and security by enslaved African Americans.

== Present day ==
The Corporation for Thomas Jefferson's Poplar Forest has worked to restore Jefferson's plantation and retreat home since 1984, when the tax-exempt non-profit organization purchased 50 acres of land and the original buildings with the goal of preserving the estate for public educational benefit. The corporation operates Poplar Forest as a historic house museum with the mission to preserve, inspire, and tell the emerging story of Thomas Jefferson's Poplar Forest.

Poplar Forest first welcomed visitors in 1986, and now conducts guided tours thematically dedicated to the main retreat house and the enslaved community in addition to its ongoing restoration and archaeological work. The property is a National Historic Landmark and designated a Virginia History Trails site as part of Virginia's 2019 Commemoration.

== See also ==
- Jeffersonian architecture
- List of National Historic Landmarks in Virginia
- National Register of Historic Places listings in Bedford County, Virginia
