= Twin Oaks Farm =

Historic house in Virginia, United States

- U.S. National Register of Historic Places
- Virginia Landmarks Register
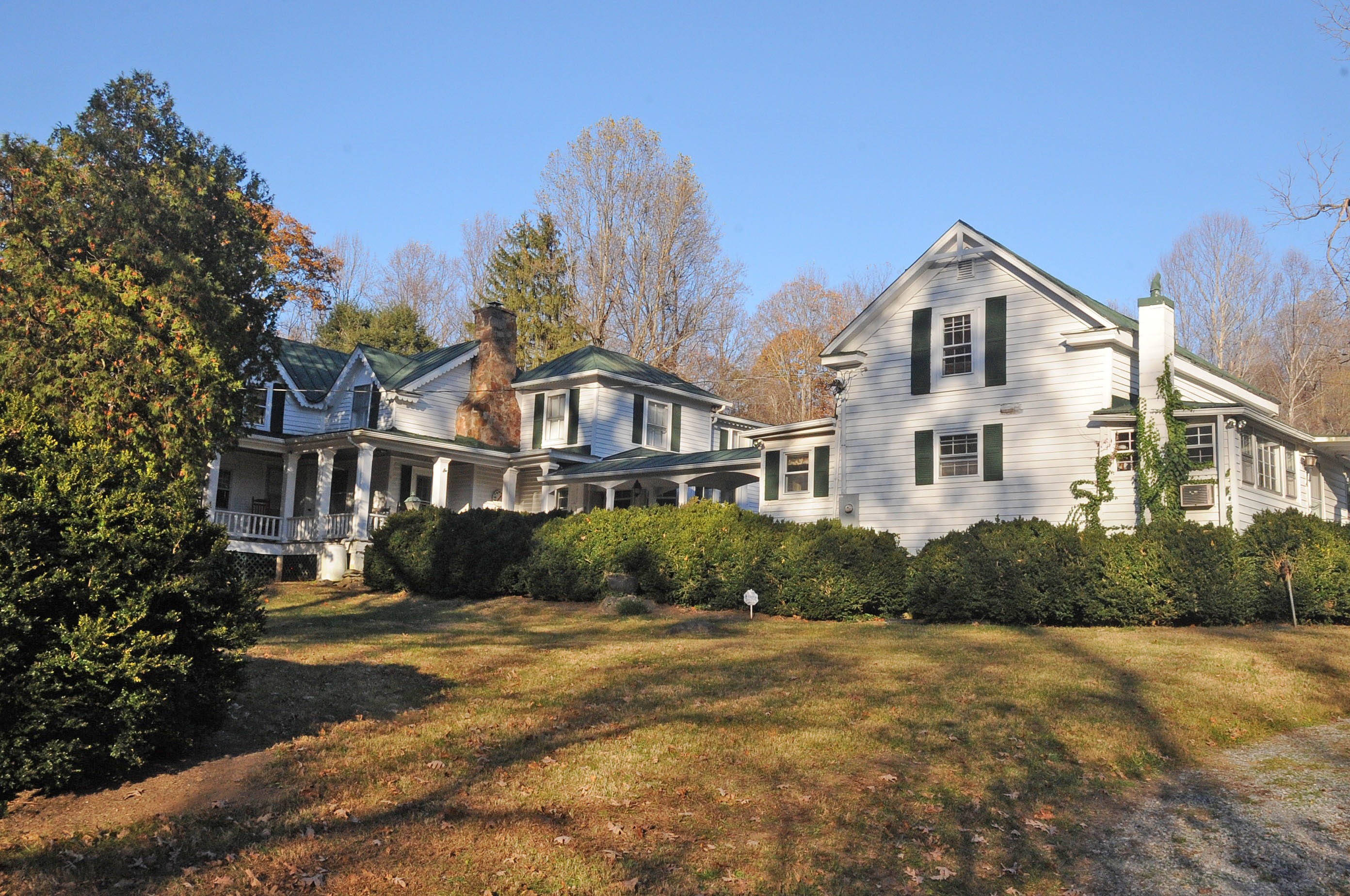

- Location within Virginia Location within the United States
- Location: VA 2, Bedford County, Virginia
- Coordinates: 37°25′44″N 79°37′54″W
- Area: 158 acres (64 ha)
- Built: c. 1850
- Architectural style: Gothic Revival
- NRHP reference No.: 01000704
- VLR No.: 009-5273

Significant dates
- Added to NRHP: July 5, 2001
- Designated VLR: March 14, 2001

Twin Oaks Farm is a historic home and farm located in Bedford County, Virginia. It was built about 1850, and is a rambling two-story frame and log farmhouse with Gothic Revival style decorative detailing. It features a frame wraparound porch on the south and west elevations. Also on the property are a contributing dingle dwelling (1930s), spring house (1850s), tenant house (1916), Apple Barn (1916), and chicken coop (1920s). The farm supported cannery production from 1909 to 1937.

It was listed on the National Register of Historic Places in 2001.
