= Three Otters =

Historic house in Virginia, United States

- U.S. National Register of Historic Places
- Virginia Landmarks Register
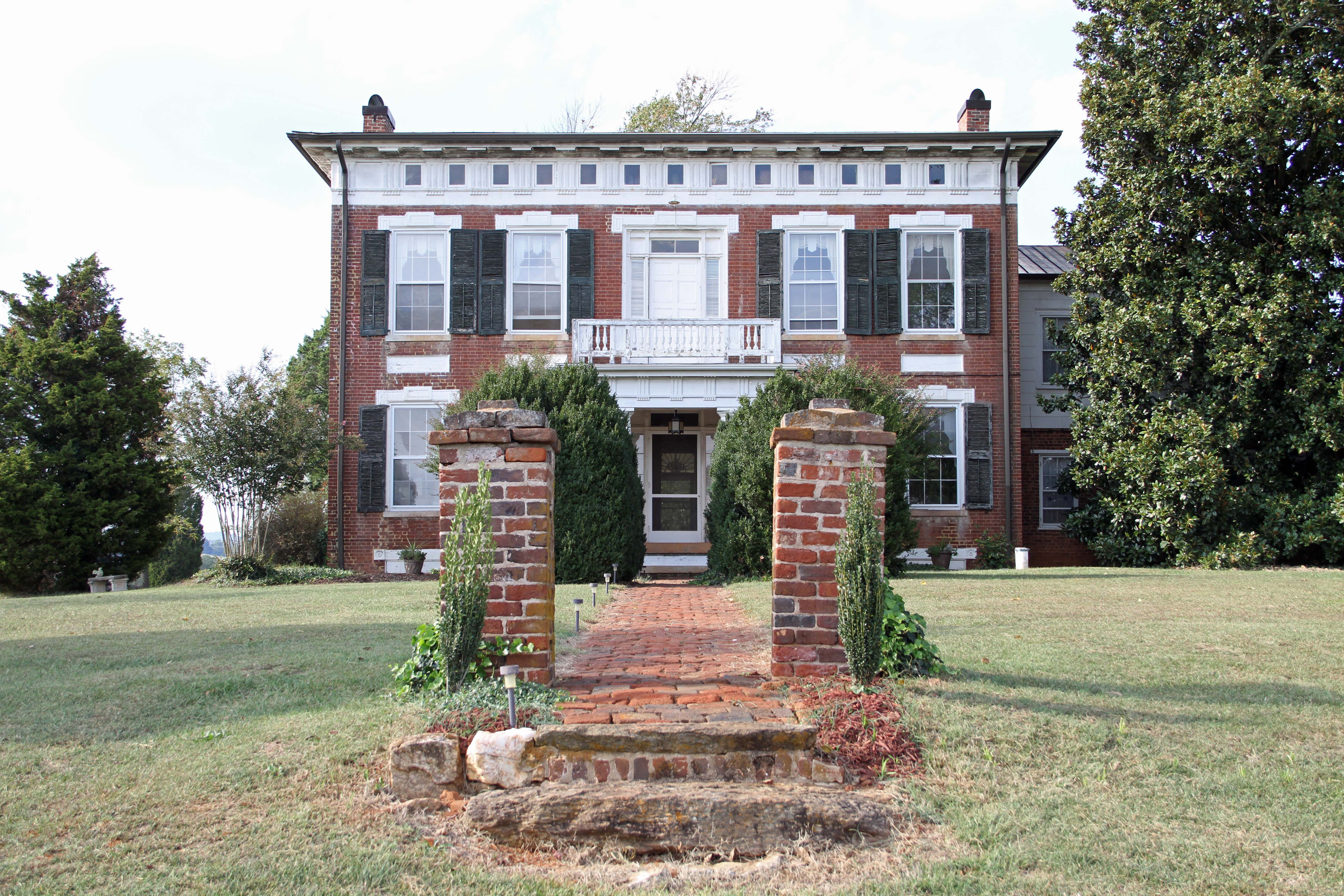
- Three Otters, September 2012

- Location within Virginia Location within the United States
- Location: W of jct. of Rte. 838 and VA 43, near Bedford, Virginia
- Coordinates: 37°21′22″N 79°32′46″W
- Area: 90 acres (36 ha)
- Built: 1827
- Architectural style: Greek Revival
- NRHP reference No.: 70000785
- VLR No.: 009-0031

Significant dates
- Added to NRHP: September 15, 1970
- Designated VLR: July 7, 1970

Three Otters is a historic home near Bedford, Bedford County, Virginia. Built about 1827 by local artisans following the pattern book of Asher Benjamin for a local merchant, the large, two-story, brick dwelling exemplifies the Greek Revival style. It is approximately 50 feet square, with a low pitched hipped roof. The original two-story kitchen and pantry outbuilding is connected to the main house by a covered walkway and a two-story brick-and-frame addition. There are a contributing brick smoke house, well house, chicken house, and necessary.

It was listed on the National Register of Historic Places in 1971.
