= Old Rectory (Perrowville, Virginia) =

Historic house in Virginia, United States

- U.S. National Register of Historic Places
- Virginia Landmarks Register
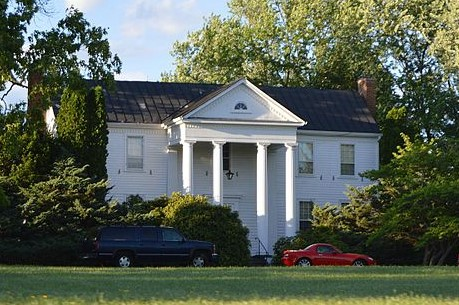
- Seen from the front

- Location within Virginia Location within the United States
- Location: S of Perrowville on VA 663, near Perrowville, Virginia
- Coordinates: 37°24′9″N 79°20′15″W
- Area: 25 acres (10 ha)
- Built: 1787
- NRHP reference No.: 73001998
- VLR No.: 009-0056

Significant dates
- Added to NRHP: July 24, 1973
- Designated VLR: September 16, 1973

Old Rectory of St. Stephen's Episcopal Church is a historic Episcopal church rectory located near Perrowville, Bedford County, Virginia. It was built in 1787, and is a T-shaped frame dwelling with exterior end chimneys and a gable roof. It features a modern one bay, two-story portico supported by four fluted Doric order columns. From around 1828 to 1904, the house served as the rectory of St. Stephen's Episcopal Church.

It was listed on the National Register of Historic Places in 1973.
