= Bedford Historic District (Bedford, Virginia) =

Historic district in Virginia, United States

- U.S. National Register of Historic Places
- U.S. Historic district
- Virginia Landmarks Register
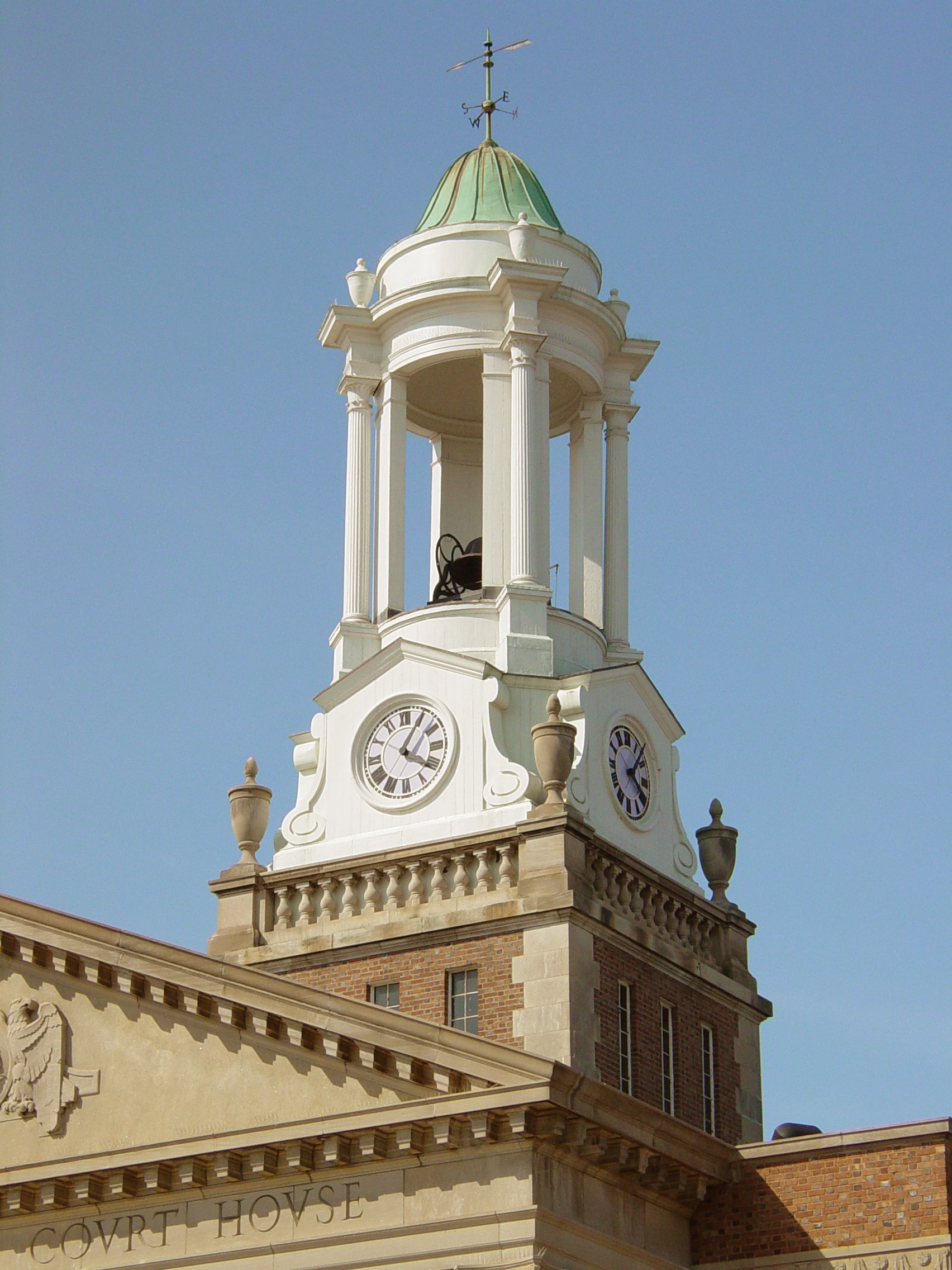
- Bedford County Court House cupola, April 2005

- Location within Virginia Location within the United States
- Location: Roughly bounded by Longwood, Bedford, and Mountain Aves., Peaks, Oak, Grove, and Washington Sts., Bedford, Virginia
- Coordinates: 37°20′15″N 79°31′21″W
- Area: 105 acres (42 ha)
- Architect: Multiple
- Architectural style: Greek Revival, Late Victorian, Federal
- NRHP reference No.: 84000031
- VLR No.: 141-0073

Significant dates
- Added to NRHP: October 4, 1984
- Designated VLR: August 21, 1984

Bedford Historic District is a national historic district located at Bedford, Virginia. The district encompasses 208 contributing buildings in two residential neighborhoods of Bedford, known locally as the Old Avenel area and the Longwood Avenue area.

The buildings are in a variety of 19th- and early 20th-century architectural styles. Notable buildings include Chestnut, Winthrop, the Thomas L. Leftwich House, Liberty Presbyterian Church (1844), John Wharton House (1848), Burks-Guy House (1884), Charles W. Wharton House (now the Bedford Children's Library), the Harrison Building (1878), George L. Colgate House (1892), Bedford Masonic Hall (1895), Citizens Bank Building (Bedford, Virginia), Bedford High School (1928), Bedford County Courthouse (1930), Bedford Elementary School (1912), Main Street Methodist Church (1880s), and St. John's Episcopal Church (1923). Avenel (1836) and the John D. Ballard House (1915) are separately listed.

The District was listed on the National Register of Historic Places in 1984.

== See also ==
- National Elks Home in Bedford, Virginia
