= New Prospect Church =

Historic church in Virginia, United States

- U.S. National Register of Historic Places
- Virginia Landmarks Register
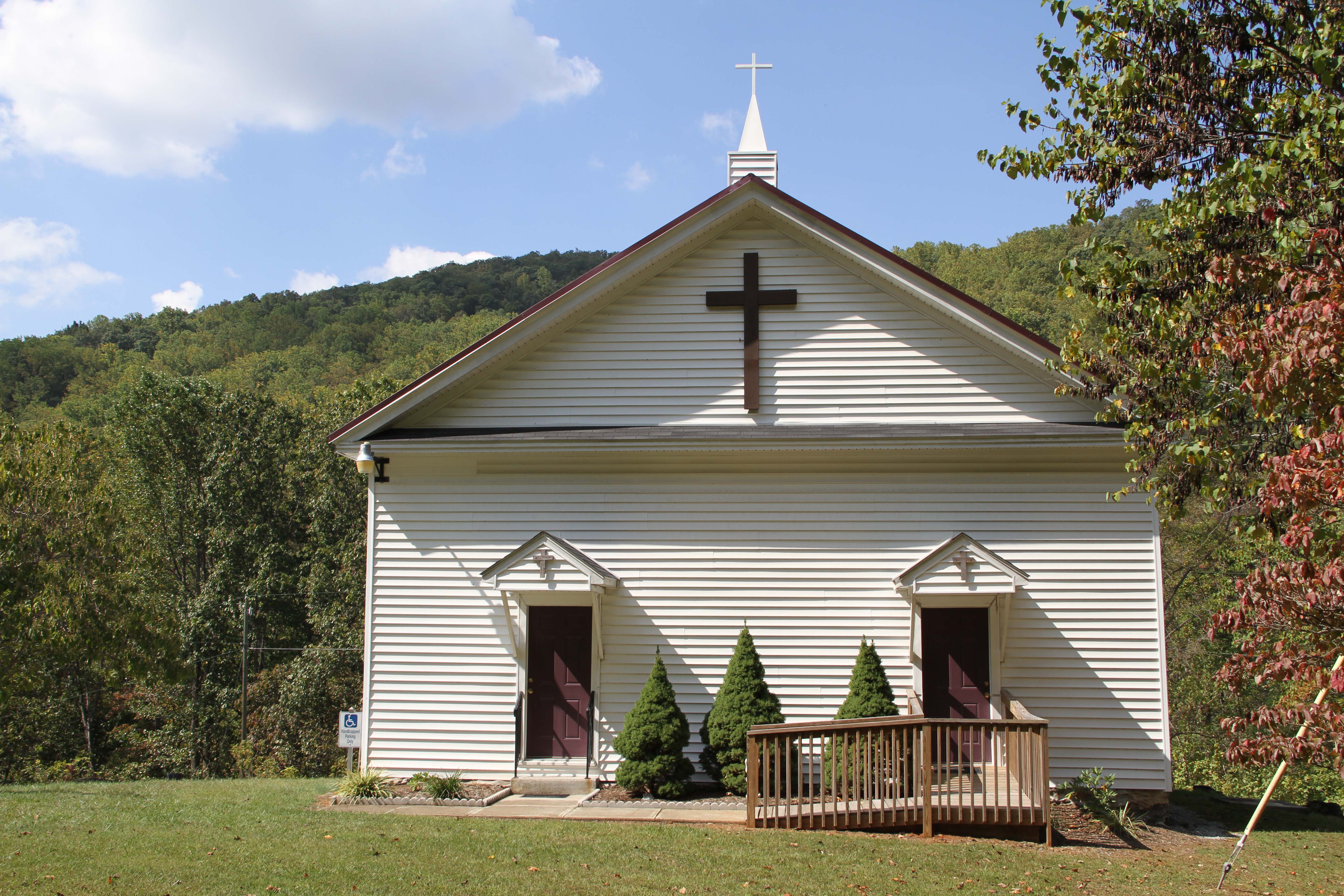

- Location within Virginia Location within the United States
- Location: 4445 Sheep Creek Rd., near Bedford, Virginia
- Coordinates: 37°25′35″N 79°32′44″W
- Area: 1 acre (0.40 ha)
- Built: 1880
- Architectural style: Greek Revival
- NRHP reference No.: 00000312
- VLR No.: 009-5211

Significant dates
- Added to NRHP: March 31, 2000
- Designated VLR: June 16, 1999

New Prospect Church, also known as New Prospect Baptist Church, is a historic Baptist church located at 4445 Sheep Creek Road near Bedford, Bedford County, Virginia, United States. It was built in 1880, and is a one-story, wood-frame building painted white and in a vernacular Greek Revival style. It measures 34 feet wide and 45 feet long, and has a low-pitched gable roof. The church has two entrances, one for the men and one for the women and children.

It was listed on the National Register of Historic Places in 2000.
