= New London Airport (Virginia) =

Coordinates: 37°16′19″N 079°20′09″W

- IATA: none; ICAO: none; FAA LID: W90

Summary
- Airport type: Public
- Owner: Liberty University
- Serves: Forest, Virginia
- Elevation AMSL: 849 ft / 259 m
- Website: NewLondonAirport.com
- Interactive map of New London Airport

Runways
Direction	Length		Surface
Direction	ft	m	Surface
18/36	3,164	964	Asphalt

Statistics (2007)
- Aircraft operations: 28,478
- Based aircraft: 76
- Source: Federal Aviation Administration

New London Airport (FAA LID: W90) is a public-use airport located six miles (10 km) southwest of the central business district of Forest, a town in Bedford County, Virginia, United States. It is privately owned by Liberty University.

It is a public airport, but usually involves GA aircraft only. On Sundays during the summer and early fall, the runway is used as a dragstrip.

== History ==
Originally built in 1957 as a 1/4 mile dragstrip, airport operations were added in 1961 and the facility has served a dual-purpose since. Having been under the continued guidance of Rucker Tibbs, the airport changed hands in December 2005.

== Facilities and aircraft ==
New London Airport covers an area of 133 acres (54 ha) which contains one asphalt paved runway (17/35) measuring 3,164 x 40 ft (964 x 12 m). For the 12-month period ending April 30, 2007, the airport had 28,478 aircraft operations, an average of 78 per day: 98% general aviation and 2% military. There are 76 aircraft based at this airport.
