= Forest, Virginia =

Census-designated place in Virginia, US

- Census-designated place
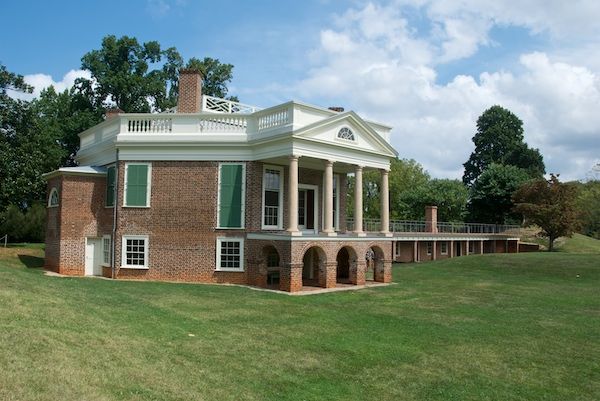
- Thomas Jefferson's Poplar Forest

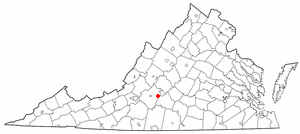
- Location of Forest, Virginia
- Coordinates: 37°22′15″N 79°16′0″W
- Country: United States
- State: Virginia
- County: Bedford

Area
  - Total: 13.9 sq mi (35.9 km^{2})
  - Land: 13.7 sq mi (35.6 km^{2})
  - Water: 0.12 sq mi (0.3 km^{2})
- Elevation: 873 ft (266 m)

Population (2020)
  - Total: 11,709
  - Density: 852/sq mi (329/km^{2})
- Time zone: UTC−5 (Eastern (EST))
  - Summer (DST): UTC−4 (EDT)
- ZIP code: 24551
- Area code: 434
- FIPS code: 51-28688
- GNIS feature ID: 1494932

Forest is a census-designated place (CDP) in eastern Bedford County, Virginia, United States. The population was 11,709 at the 2020 census. It is part of the Lynchburg Metropolitan Statistical Area.

== Geography ==
Forest is located at 37°22′15″N 79°16′0″W (37.370723, −79.266801).

According to the United States Census Bureau, the CDP has a total area of 13.9 square miles (35.9 km^{2}), of which 13.7 square miles (35.6 km^{2}) is land and 0.12 square miles (0.3 km^{2}), or 0.89%, is water.

== Economy ==
Forest is a suburban part of metropolitan Lynchburg, containing many subdivided properties carved from and around surrounding farms and woodlands. The Ivy Hill community is the largest development and is built around the Ivy Hill Golf Course. The community has been experiencing rapid growth and development over the past 20 years, especially after U.S. Route 221 (Forest Road) was widened to four lanes in 2009. The growth of commercial businesses and housing, which slowed during the Great Recession, is expected to continue into the near future.

Forest has no real town center since the original one was torn down without a trace, but the area along Forest Road from the post office to the Forest Library is generally regarded as the central part of the community; however, the community extends all the way along Forest Road from the middle school to Graves Mill Shopping Center. The political attitudes of the majority of the population are conservative. There are a few older homes along a loop behind the library and two churches that would have been in close proximity to the former Norfolk & Western rail station, which was torn down in the late 2010s. This might have been considered the main stop for Forest prior to sub-urbanization and commercial development along Forest Road.

Liberty University's Center for Engineering Research and Education (CERE) in the New London Business & Technology Center park on U.S. Route 460 in New London is a small but increasingly significant engineering center developed with partnerships by private industry, regional governments, the Tobacco Commission, in addition to the university. Existing businesses in the park include Simplimatic Automation, NanoSeptic Technologies, and a 40,000 square foot shell building is available for sale or lease.

== Demographics ==
Historical population
Census	Pop.	Note	%±
2000	8,006		—
2010	9,106		13.7%
2020	11,709		28.6%
Source: U.S. Census Bureau

=== 2020 census ===
As of the 2020 census, Forest had a population of 11,709. The median age was 41.7 years. 20.9% of residents were under the age of 18 and 20.4% of residents were 65 years of age or older. For every 100 females there were 89.3 males, and for every 100 females age 18 and over there were 85.6 males age 18 and over.

95.0% of residents lived in urban areas, while 5.0% lived in rural areas.

There were 4,792 households in Forest, of which 26.7% had children under the age of 18 living in them. Of all households, 54.9% were married-couple households, 14.4% were households with a male householder and no spouse or partner present, and 27.7% were households with a female householder and no spouse or partner present. About 27.7% of all households were made up of individuals and 11.4% had someone living alone who was 65 years of age or older.

There were 5,012 housing units, of which 4.4% were vacant. The homeowner vacancy rate was 1.4% and the rental vacancy rate was 5.5%.

Racial composition as of the 2020 census
Race	Number	Percent
White	9,662	82.5%
Black or African American	796	6.8%
American Indian and Alaska Native	25	0.2%
Asian	396	3.4%
Native Hawaiian and Other Pacific Islander	2	0.0%
Some other race	126	1.1%
Two or more races	702	6.0%
Hispanic or Latino (of any race)	474	4.0%

=== 2010 census ===
As of the census of 2010, there were 9,106 people residing in the CDP. There were 3,922 housing units. The racial makeup of the CDP was 87.8% White, 7.2% African American or Black, 0.1% American Indian, 3.0% Asian, 0.0% Pacific Islander, 0.9% from other races, and 0.9% from two or more races. Hispanic or Latino of any race were 2.9% of the population.

=== 2000 census ===
As of the census of 2000, there were 8,006 people, 3,172 households, and 2,293 families residing in the CDP. The population density was 547.8 people per square mile (211.6/km^{2}). There were 3,294 housing units at an average density of 225.4/sq mi (87.1/km^{2}). The racial makeup of the CDP was 91.79% White, 5.65% African American, 0.10% Native American, 1.36% Asian, 0.01% Pacific Islander, 0.27% from other races, and 0.81% from two or more races. Hispanic or Latino of any race were 0.95% of the population.

There were 3,172 households, out of which 35.8% had children under the age of 18 living with them, 62.9% were married couples living together, 7.2% had a female householder with no husband present, and 27.7% were non-families. 24.5% of all households were made up of individuals, and 5.8% had someone living alone who was 65 years of age or older. The average household size was 2.52 and the average family size was 3.03.

In the CDP the population was spread out, with 26.9% under the age of 18, 6.1% from 18 to 24, 31.5% from 25 to 44, 26.0% from 45 to 64, and 9.5% who were 65 years of age or older. The median age was 38 years. For every 100 females there were 96.8 males. For every 100 females aged 18 and over, there were 92.6 males.

The median income for a household in the CDP was $55,089, and the median income for a family was $67,055. Males had a median income of $46,057 versus $30,720 for females. The per capita income for the CDP was $25,735. About 2.9% of families and 3.1% of the population were below the poverty line, including 1.3% of those under age 18 and 3.7% of those age 65 or over.

== Government ==
The United States Postal Service operates the Forest Post Office within the CDP.

Law enforcement is provided by the Bedford County Sheriff's Office. Fire protection is provided by the Forest Volunteer Fire Company, which operates a fire station within the CDP. Emergency medical services are provided by the Campbell County Volunteer Rescue Squad and Bedford County Department of Fire and Rescue, which operates from a station within the CDP.

== Education ==
The CDP is served by Bedford County Public Schools. Public school students residing in Forest are zoned to attend one of four nearby elementary schools, Forest Middle School, and Jefferson Forest High School. A private school, Timberlake Christian School, is also located in neighboring Timberlake.

The closest higher education institutions to the CDP are located in Bedford and Lynchburg.

== Infrastructure ==
The Bedford Regional Water Authority maintains public water and wastewater systems in the CDP.

The County partnered with ZiTel and Shentel on large expansion projects, and Verizon completed a smaller project in 2023. By late 2026, all projects will be complete with around 15,000 previously unserved or underserved addresses now having access to high-speed internet. The initiative also spurred increased competition, prompting private broadband expansions from companies like Lumos and Comcast.

== Transportation ==
=== Airports ===
The nearest airport offering commercial service is Lynchburg Regional Airport, which offers flights through American Airlines to Charlotte, North Carolina and United Airlines with service to Washington Dulles and Chicago O'Hare. Private charter flights are available through Virginia Aviation. There is also a public general aviation (GA) airport, New London Airport, which is open for all GA pilots.

=== Road ===
- US Route 221

=== Rail ===
The closest passenger rail service is located at Kemper Street station in Lynchburg, which is a stop for Amtrak's Crescent and Northeast Regional trains.

== Attractions and entertainment ==
A popular attraction of Forest is Poplar Forest, the summer home of Thomas Jefferson, which is open to the public for visitation and is the subject of ongoing archaeological studies. The home is also used for events. Nearby attractions include Point of Honor in Lynchburg, the National D-Day Memorial in Bedford, and the Peaks of Otter in the Blue Ridge Mountains. The nearest urban center is downtown Lynchburg, approximately 10 miles (16 km) northeast of town.

== Notable people ==
- John Early (bishop), Methodist Episcopal Church, South was "of Forest neighborhood."
- Cynthia Dunbar, Republican National Committeewoman for Virginia; law professor at Liberty University School of Law, former member of the Texas State Board of Education.
- Rashad Jennings, NFL running back formerly for the New York Giants, the Oakland Raiders, and the Jacksonville Jaguars.
