= Battle of Cumberland Church =

Battle of the American Civil War

Coordinates: 37.3464°N 78.3866°W

- Part of the American Civil War
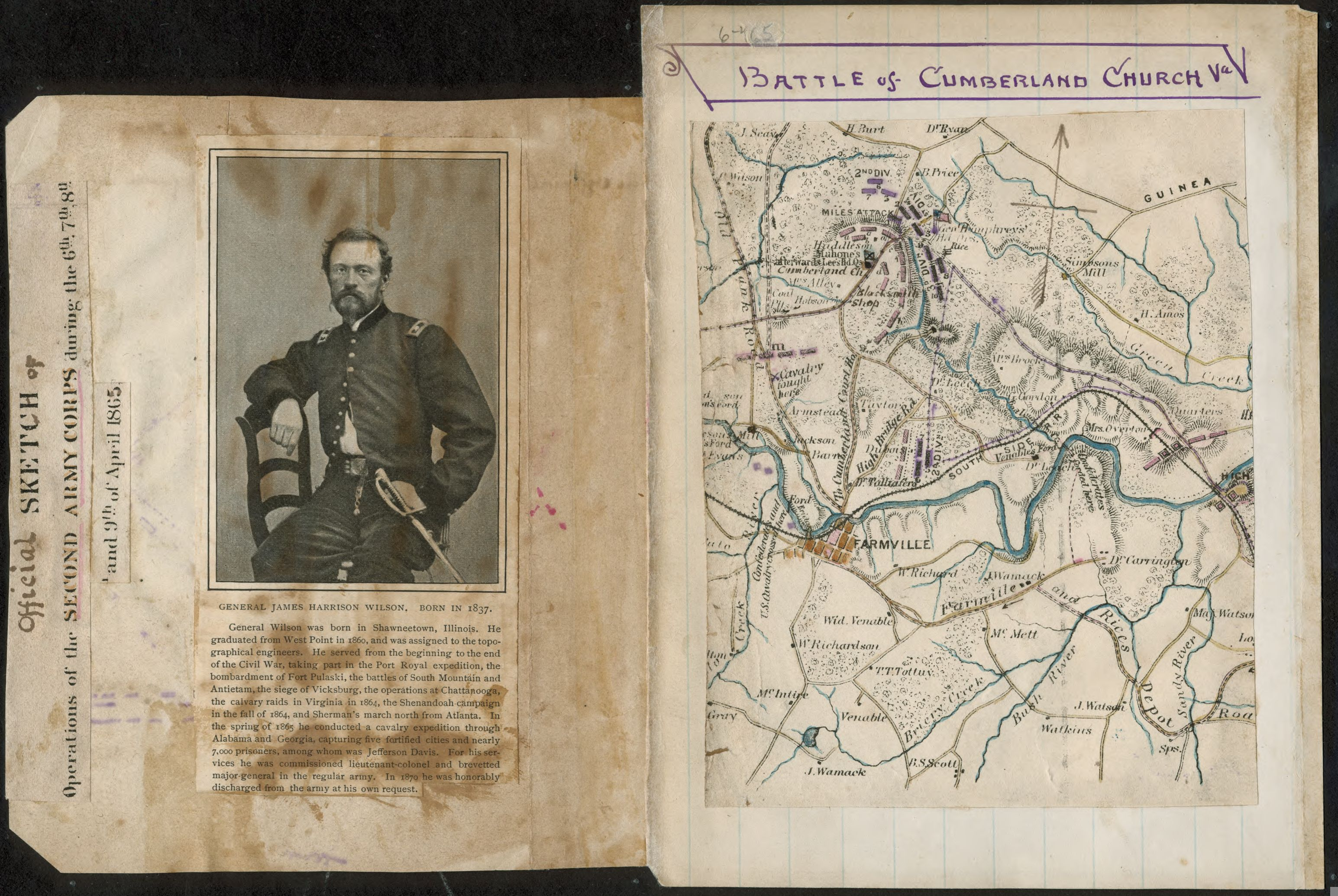
- Map shows the area between Farmville, Va., and Cumberland Courthouse to the north. This was a small skirmish just north of Farmville in Cumberland County on April 7, 1865, just following action at Highbridge and Rice's Station.
Date	April 7, 1865
Location	Cumberland County, Virginia, near Farmville, Virginia
Result	Confederate victory

Belligerents
United States (Union)	(Confederate States of America) Confederate States (Confederacy)

Commanders and leaders
Andrew A. Humphreys; George Crook; J. Irvin Gregg (Note: The listed commanders include those of the infantry battle and the nearby cavalry battle sometimes referred to as the Battle of Farmville.)	Robert E. Lee; Thomas L. Rosser; Thomas T. Munford

Units involved
II Corps Union Army; Army of the Potomac, Cavalry Corps, Second Division	Army of North Virginia

Strength
12,000	12,000

Casualties and losses
645 (Note: Calkins, 1997, p. 202, lists 571 Union casualties at the infantry battle at Cumberland Church and 74 cavalry casualties at the simultaneous nearby action sometimes called the Battle of Farmville. Humphreys, 1883, p. 390 gives the casualties for his II Corps as 571.)	255

The Battle of Cumberland Church was fought on April 7, 1865, between the Union Army's II Corps of the Army of the Potomac and the Confederate Army of Northern Virginia during the Appomattox Campaign of the American Civil War.

After the Battle of Sailor's Creek on April 6, 1865, surviving Confederate troops of Lieutenant General Richard H. Anderson and Major General John B. Gordon headed for the High Bridge, a double-deck structure with a railroad bridge on top and a lower wagon road bridge over the Appomattox River to cross to the north side of the river and continue their retreat to the west. The Confederates intended to destroy the bridge, which they had fought to save the day before in the Battle of High Bridge, but through mistakes and delays did not start to do so until Union troops of Major General Andrew A. Humphreys's II Corps began to arrive at the bridges. After a second smaller Battle of High Bridge, the Union soldiers at the scene kept the railroad bridge from total destruction and saved the wagon bridge in shape for use.

Humphreys's troops pursued the last division in the line of march, the division of Major General William Mahone to Cumberland Church about 4 miles (6.4 km) to the west and 3 miles (4.8 km) north of Farmville, Virginia where the Confederates began to fortify the high ground around the church. Soon, Lieutenant General James Longstreet with the entire remaining Confederate infantry moved up from Farmville, Virginia to join Mahone, burning the railroad and wagon bridges at Farmville after them. The Confederate cavalry and one infantry brigade that were left behind had to ford the river nearby.

After some fighting in transit to Cumberland Church in which Brigadier General Thomas A. Smyth was mortally wounded, Humphreys ordered his two divisions, which reached the church soon after Mahone, to attack the Confederate line. Finding the Confederate position too strong to take, Humphreys recalled Brigadier General Francis Barlow's division, which had been heading directly to Farmville in pursuit of Gordon's corps, and sent a message to Army of the Potomac commander Major General George Meade that Lee's whole army was north of the river. Humphreys suggested that reinforcements be sent in order to engage the full Confederate Army. Neither Humphreys nor Meade knew until later that the Confederates had destroyed the bridges at Farmville and no reinforcements could reach Humphreys that afternoon.

Mistaking a separate nearby cavalry engagement as the arrival of reinforcements engaging with Lee's infantry, Humphreys ordered another futile attack, which was repulsed by the Confederates. Colonel (Brevet Brigadier General) John Irvin Gregg was taken prisoner by the Confederates in the cavalry engagement. Since no reinforcements could quickly reach Humphreys and night was approaching, Humphreys ordered no further attacks. The II Corps had at least 571 casualties in the Battle at Cumberland Church and the cavalry had 74 in what is sometimes called the Battle of Farmville. Confederate casualties are unknown but have been estimated to be about half the number of the Union casualties. The National Park Service gives the number of Confederate casualties as 255.

Realizing that the Union forces could close in on his men at Cumberland Church, General Robert E. Lee withdrew his army in another night march to the west at about 11:00 p.m. Although the Confederates held back the Union Army at Cumberland Church and had fewer casualties, they were delayed in their march, which helped other Union forces south of the Appomattox River to pass them and cut them off at the Battle of Appomattox Court House.

== Background ==
=== Retreat from Sailor's Creek ===
Because of the need to reduce steep grades in the vicinity of Farmville, the South Side Railroad crossed from the south side of the Appomattox River to the north side over the High Bridge east of Farmville, about 6 miles (9.7 km) from Rice's Station. From High Bridge, the railroad ran parallel to the north bank of the river until it reached Farmville, Virginia, 4 miles (6.4 km) to the southwest. At Farmville, the railroad crossed back to the south side of the river and proceeded to the west. The railroad bridge at Farmville also had an adjacent wagon bridge.

After the Battle of Sailor's Creek, Confederate Lieutenant General Richard H. Anderson and Major General John B. Gordon and the defeated survivors of their corps headed for the South Side Railroad's High Bridge and the wagon bridge below it to cross to the presumed relative safety of the north side of the Appomattox River. After fighting unsuccessfully to destroy the bridges after themselves, Gordon and his men followed the route of the railroad over the High Bridge, along the north bank of the river, and back to the south side of the river over the bridges at Farmville to obtain rations and then immediately return to the north side of the river from Farmville.

=== Longstreet moves to, evacuates Farmville ===
Lieutenant General James Longstreet's corps, which had reached Rice's Station on the morning of April 6, had moved past Sailor's Creek because they were at the head of the march and missed the battle there. After the minor Battle of Rice's Station on April 6, in a night march, Longstreet's corps slipped away from Major General John Gibbon's XXIV Corps of Major General Edward Ord's Army of the James, which had approached the Confederate lines at Rice's Station during afternoon. Longstreet's corps stayed south of the river and headed west for Farmville during the night. Confederate cavalry had been covering Longstreet's march but after crossing Bush River, Longstreet placed Alfred M. Scales's brigade (under the command of Colonel Joseph H. Hyman) of Major General Cadmus Wilcox's division as the rear guard.

Longstreet's troops began to arrive at Farmville, under close pursuit by Union Major General George Crook's cavalry division, at about 9:00 a.m.on April 7. Gibbon's XXIV Corps of Ord's Army of the James, reinforced by Brigadier General William Birney's second division of the XXV Corps, followed closely behind Crook's cavalry. Rations were promptly issued to Longstreet's men at Farmville but the soldiers were told to march to the north side of the river to begin their meal preparations.

When Confederate Commissary General Isaac M. St. John heard gunfire just outside town, he sent the ration trains west on the South Side Railroad to Pamplin's Depot or Pamplin's Station in an effort to prevent their capture. Sheridan's cavalry got to Pamplin's Station first and captured 3 engines and the rolling stock with the supplies. The Confederate provost guard and their prisoners were sent down the road without rations. Some rations were passed out to troops on the march out of Farmville and the empty wagons from which they were distributed were burned. Longstreet had to move his forces quickly from Farmville to the Cumberland Church vicinity to avoid Union forces closing in the town.

=== Second Battle of High Bridge ===
Major General Andrew A. Humphreys began to march the II Corps west from the Sailor's Creek Battlefield at 5:30 a.m. on April 7. When the leading unit of the Second Division of the II Corps under the command of Brigadier General Francis C. Barlow reached High Bridge at about 7:00 a.m., they found that the Confederates had blown up the redoubt at the bridgehead on the northern (and western) side of the bridge and were just starting to burn the railroad bridge and lower wagon and foot bridge. A mistaken or misunderstood order to Lieutenant General Anderson's guards not to allow anyone to pass kept Major General William Mahone's division from crossing until the order were clarified. (Note: Anderson said that he issued the order because General Lee had ordered him to collect all stragglers. Calkins, 1997, p. 125.) Then more time was spent getting the required order to destroy the bridges to the Confederate engineers commanded by Colonel Thomas M. R. Talcott. (Note: Marvel, 2002, p. 121 states that Mahone, as commander of the rear guard, should have given the order. Mahone later tried to pass the responsibility for the delayed order to Gordon or even to say that he asked Lee to give the order directly to Talcott. Talcott stated that Mahone should have given the order and that he had to send his second-in-command looking for orders to destroy the bridge and found Mahone 4 miles (6.4 km) down the road from the bridge.) This permitted the lead units of the II Corps to reach the bridge just as the Confederates were attempting to destroy it.

The ensuing fight to save or destroy the bridges was the second Battle of High Bridge, following the battle the previous day when a Union raiding force tried to destroy the bridge to keep the Confederates on the south side of the Appomattox River and the Confederates successfully fought to save it, killing or capturing the Union force. On the morning of April 7, the Union troops led by the 19th Maine Volunteer Infantry Regiment under Colonel Isaac R. Starbird were able to prevent the total destruction of the railroad bridge, though it had been made unusable. They were able to preserve the wagon bridge for passage of the II Corps in their pursuit of Gordon, Anderson and Mahone. Colonel William A. Olmsted's First Brigade of Barlow's division and Brigadier General Thomas Alfred Smyth's Third Brigade, joined by Brigadier General Nelson Miles's division drove off a counterattack by Mahone's troops who were trying to complete the bridges' destruction. Mahone's division was in a defensive line with two redoubts on high ground on the north bank of the river when the II Corps began to arrive at the bridges but they moved to northwest when they could not destroy the bridges and prevent Humphreys's corps from crossing the river.

Gordon's corps moved up river along the railroad bed toward Farmville. Humphreys, with Miles's and Brigadier General Regis de Trobriand's divisions, followed Mahone while Barlow's division followed Gordon.

=== Pursuit; Smyth mortally wounded ===
Gordon's corps and Barlow's division skirmished from High Bridge to the northern outskirts of Farmville. An advance Union party of 103 men from the 7th Michigan Infantry Regiment and the 59th New York Infantry Regiment were taken prisoner by the 9th (1st) North Carolina Battalion of Sharp Shooters of Brigadier General John A. Walker's division.

Barlow's division caught up with part of Gordon's division and cut off and burned 135 wagons along the road. During this attack, Brigadier General Smyth was mortally wounded by a sniper shot as he rode with his skirmish line within 50 yards (46 m) of Gordon's rear guard near Farmville.

Colonel Daniel Woodall of the 1st Delaware Infantry Regiment assumed command of the Third Brigade. Smyth's men were stunned by his fall and refused to move for several minutes as Gordon's men began to withdraw. Colonel William A. Olmsted's brigade moved to support Smyth's brigade but about 100 of his men were captured as Confederate rear guards rushed Smyth's hesitating troops. Barlow's men ceased the pursuit altogether as they reached the vicinity of the edge of Farmville north of the river.

=== Union troops take Farmville; Confederates withdraw north ===
While the VI Corps pursued Mahone's division and Gordon's corps north of the Appomattox River, Ord and Gibbons with the XXIV Corps and a brigade of cavalry from Crook's division engaged with Longstreet's rear guard, Scales's brigade and the cavalry, at Briery Creek, just short of Bush River. During this encounter, the other men of Cadmus Wilcox's division received rations at Farmville and moved to the north side of the river. The 1st Maine Cavalry Regiment, armed with 16-shot Henry repeating rifles, led the attack on the Confederate rear guard and the Union forces drove them toward Farmville.

Wilcox led his division back across the river to protect the rear guard and the trains with rations just before they moved out toward Pamplin Station. Wilcox then took his men back to the north side of the river cross and Alexander's men started to burn the bridge. Since the Confederates burned the bridge before all their troops were across, Major General Thomas L. Rosser's and Colonel Thomas T. Munford's cavalry divisions and Brigadier General John Bratton's infantry brigade had to cross the river further upstream under fire from Crook's lead units.

Crook's cavalry came into town and captured stragglers while the XXIV Corps was only .05 miles (0.080 km) away when the bridge was burned. By the time the main body of Crook's cavalry reached Farmville, most of the Confederates had crossed to the north side of the Appomattox River and burned the bridges leading from the main part of town to the north side of the river. (Note: Marvel, 2002, p. 125 states that a "fringe of Farmville ... lay north of the river".) The cavalry ford that Crook's men soon discovered was too deep for the infantry to cross.

By 1:30 p.m., Union troops of the Army of the James and Major General Horatio Wright's VI Corps of the Army of the Potomac occupied Farmville while Crook's cavalry found a spot just northwest of town to ford the Appomattox River. Soon thereafter, Union Army General-in-Chief Lieutenant General Ulysses S. Grant and his staff arrived in Farmville, making the Randolph House (Prince Edward Hotel) his headquarters.

When all of the Confederates crossed the river from Farmville, they formed a line of battle on Cumberland Heights overlooking the town. Artillery was set up to fire on the Union troops as they moved into Farmville. After a short period of time, the Confederates withdrew 3 miles (4.8 km) to the north to join Mahone's division around Cumberland Church. At this location, First Corps (Longstreet's) artillery chief Edward Porter Alexander told General Lee that the route of march to Appomattox Station was 8 miles (13 km) shorter on the south side of the river and they should have stayed there. (Note: Lee did not respond immediately but asked Alexander to check the mileage with local troops. When Alexander confirmed the information, Lee said: "Well there is time enough to think about that. Go and attend to these matters." (Lee was referring to the destruction of the bridges at Farmville.) Alexander later wrote: "Indeed, no man who looked at our situation on a map, or who understood the geography of the country, could fail to see that General Grant had us completely in a trap. ... We were now in a sort of jug shaped peninsula between the James River and Appomattox and there was but one outlet, the neck of the jug at Appomattox Court House, and to that Grant had the shortest road." Calkins, 1997, pp. 129–130.) About this time, Lee also learned that Union troops had followed the Confederates across High Bridge and he could not break away from them on the north side. Having burned the bridges at Farmville, Lee's troops could not cross back to the south side of the river there.

=== Battle at Cumberland Church ===
At Cumberland Church, about 5 miles (8.0 km) northwest of High Bridge and 3 miles (4.8 km) north of Farmville, Mahone's Confederates arrived first and controlled the high ground around the church. They entrenched on top of a long slope of open ground, covering the stage and plank roads to Lynchburg. Lieutenant General Anderson with little more than a few stragglers and a battalion of artillery headed west when Mahone told him that Humphreys was approaching on the same side of the river with them.

Union II Corps commander Major General Humphreys, with Brigadier Generals Miles's and de Trobriand's divisions, arrived near the Lynchburg stage road at Cumberland Church about 1:00 p.m. and became engaged not just with Mahone's division, but with the entire remaining Confederate Army of Northern Virginia. (Note: Prisoners told their Union captors that Lee's entire army was at Cumberland Church, which in fact it was or soon would be. Humphreys, 1883, p. 388.) As the Union force approached, Lieutenant Colonel William T. Poague's 16-gun artillery battalion opened fire on them. Soldiers from Miles's division temporarily captured the guns of Captain Arthur B. Williams's North Carolina Battery but troops of Major General Bryan Grimes's division recaptured them. Despite evident confusion and disorganization, especially among the survivors of commands hard hit at Sailor's Creek and Gordon's men who had not arrived at Farmville to get rations from the trains that had been there, the Confederates began to prepare defenses at Cumberland Church.

As Humphreys's men approached, Gordon's men caught up with Mahone's and the entire effective Army of Northern Virginia was near Cumberland Church. Historian William Marvel stated that with artillery, about 12,000 effective Confederate men held the position at Cumberland Church. They immediately began to prepare a line of thin breastworks in a fish hook formation when they reached the hill. Mahone's division held the right of the line with Poague's battery on its right. Gordon's corps got in line to the right of Poague and Longstreet's corps moved into position next to Gordon. Some of Major General Fitzhugh Lee's cavalry moved to protect Mahone's left flank. Other Confederate cavalrymen were in the rear supported by Major General Henry Heth's division.

Humphreys had about the same number of men, 12,000, but did not have the high ground, fortifications or interior lines of communication that the Confederate defenders had. A heavy Union skirmish line moved forward but Miles and de Trobriand found they were unable to make a successful flank attack against Mahone along the Jamestown Road.

When Humphreys realized that the Confederates held a strong position in force, he recalled Barlow's division, which had been marching along the South Side Railroad following Gordon's corps toward Farmville and to guard against a Confederate move toward Danville, to rejoin the other II Corps divisions. At the same time, Humphreys sent a message to Army of the Potomac commander Major General George Meade telling him that Lee's entire army was at Cumberland Church and suggesting that a corps should come up from Farmville and attack the Confederates from the other side. Neither Humphreys nor Meade yet knew that the Confederates had destroyed the bridges at Farmville and infantry could not ford the swollen river there.

After the initial Union foray was repulsed, Miles moved to his right and tried again to get his men around Mahone's left flank. Humphreys heard gunfire from the direction of Farmville and saw the Confederates shorten their right flank, so he thought the VI Corps had crossed the river and were starting their attack. He had Miles send Colonel George W. Scott's brigade to turn the Confederate left flank.

Scott's men had to move uphill through some rolling hills, valleys and ravines to reach the Confederate fortifications. Despite heavy fire, including canister, and the movement of Brigadier General William Forney's Alabama brigade to the left to protect the flank, some of the Union force made it to the Confederate line. The 5th New Hampshire Infantry Regiment and their flag were captured when they got there. Reinforcements from Brigadier General George T. "Tige" Anderson's brigade of Georgians threw back other Union troops of Scott's brigade who were starting to have some success turning the Confederate flank. The counterattack forced Scott's men to withdraw since they were unsupported by the expected attack on the other side of the Confederate line. Mahone sent some of the men on his right to attack the Union skirmish line, but they were driven back twice. As night approached and no Union reinforcements had arrived to join the II Corps, Humphreys made no further attacks on the Confederate line.

Barlow's division returned to the II Corps at Cumberland Church only in the evening. Barlow took Miles's place on the right flank of the Union line; Miles moved his division to the center of the line; de Trobriand held the left flank.

=== Cavalry Battle of Farmville ===
The gunfire heard by Humphreys was from Crook's cavalry, which had crossed the river and attacked a wagon train about 2.5 miles (4.0 km) up the Buckingham Plank Road from Farmville. Colonel (Brevet Brigadier General) J. Irvin Gregg's division led the attack, supported by Brigadier General Henry E. Davies's and Colonel (Brevet Brigadier General) Charles H. Smith's brigades and Lieutenant James H. Lord's Battery A of the 2nd United States Artillery Regiment. The wagon train was accompanied by the survivors of Anderson's (Johnson's) and Pickett's command, hundreds of stragglers, and several artillery batteries.

As Gregg's brigade attacked the wagon train, Confederate Major General Thomas L. Rosser and Colonel Thomas T. Munford arrived and sent units of their cavalry divisions against Gregg's dispersed troopers, broke their attack and captured Gregg and some of his men as the others fell back. They were supported by Gordon's infantry having moved down from Cumberland Church. Colonel Samuel B.M. Young reformed the remainder of Gregg's brigade and with Davies's men and Lord's battery attacked the wagons again. By this time, the wagon train also had infantry and artillery support. Another Union attack was repulsed but Confederate Brigadier General William Gaston Lewis was severely wounded and captured. After Confederate troops prevented General Robert E. Lee from personally leading a counterattack by pledging to repulse the Union cavalrymen, they forced Crook's troopers to retreat across the Appomattox River to Farmville. At about this time, Sheridan had recalled Crook to Farmville and directed him to move his division to Prospect Station, 10 miles (16 km) or 12 miles (19 km) west of Farmville, where his division arrived about midnight.

=== Casualties ===
In the battle up to and at Cumberland Church, the II Corps sustained casualties of 40 killed, 210 wounded, 321 missing, total 571. Confederate casualties are unknown. In the cavalry fight, Crook's cavalry sustained casualties of 11 killed, 33 wounded and 30 missing (including General Gregg, taken prisoner), total 74. Confederate casualties, in what is sometimes separately called the Battle of Farmville, again are unknown. Confederate casualties have been estimated at about half the Union casualties. (Note: Although the other sources cited in this article do not give casualty figures or give the Confederate casualty figures as unknown, the National Park Service CWSAC battle summary gives the number as 255.)

== Aftermath ==
=== Grant asks for surrender; Lee non-committal ===
Grant wrote to Lee from Farmville at 5:00 p.m. on April 7:

General:
The results of the last week must convince you of the hopelessness of further resistance on the part of the Army of Northern Virginia in this struggle. I feel that it is so, and regard it as my duty to shift from myself the responsibility of any further effusion of blood, by asking of you the surrender of that portion of the C.S. Army known as the Army of Northern Virginia.

Grant's Adjutant-General, Brigadier General (Brevet Major General) Seth Williams, brought Grant's first message to Lee for delivery through the lines by General Humphreys's staff at about 8:30 p.m. (Note: Warner, Ezra J., Generals in Blue: Lives of the Union Commanders, Louisiana State University Press, 1964, ISBN 0-8071-0822-7. p. 563 note that Williams was Grant's inspector general at this time, although Humphreys also identifies him as adjutant general.)

Lee showed the message to Longstreet who said: "Not yet." Lee's reply to Grant stated that he disagreed with Grant about the hopelessness of his situation but he also was hoping to avoid "the useless effusion of blood" and asked Grant for the terms he would offer on condition of his army's surrender. Lee's answer came through the lines about one hour after it had been delivered and Williams returned with it to Farmville by a circuitous route over High Bridge. (Note: Williams's orderly was killed by Confederate pickets before Williams could establish his identity and purpose. Trudeau, 1994, p. 122.)

=== VI Corps cheers Grant, crosses river ===
The VI Corps marched through Farmville on the night of April 7, lit bonfires and cheered General Grant as they passed his headquarters hotel. The corps then crossed the Appomattox River on a newly built footbridge, but waited for a pontoon bridge borrowed from the XXIV Corps for their artillery and wagons to cross after which they camped on the north bank. The XXIV Corps stayed south of the river and camped just to the west of Farmville. The second and third brigades of the XXV Corps were added to Gibbon's XXIV Corps as General Birney had been reassigned to the Petersburg area to command of the newly formed Division of Fort Powhatan, City Point and Wilson's Wharf. The first brigade from Birney's division did not catch up to the rest of the Army of the James until April 10. (Note: Colonel Ulysses Doubleday's brigade was assigned to Brigadier General Robert S. Foster's division and Colonel William W. Woodward's brigade and Captain Loomis L. Langdon's artillery brigade were assigned to Brigadier General John W. Turner's division. Colonel James Shaw, Jr.'s brigade was marching some distance behind the rest of the corps. Calkins, 1997, p. 136.)

=== Cavalry, V Corps move west ===
Brigadier General Ranald Mackenzie's small cavalry division rode from Burkeville (or Burke's Junction) to Prince Edward Court House (now Worsham, Virginia) to cut off the road to Farmville and the Richmond and Danville Railroad at Keysville, Virginia. They skirmished with some outpost troops and took 38 prisoners. By 3:00 p.m., units of Brigadier General (Brevet Major General) George Armstrong Custer's and Brigadier General Thomas Devins's divisions began to arrive at Prince Edward Court House from the Sailor's Creek Battlefield. After dinner, Union Cavalry commander Major General Philip Sheridan (Note: Sheridan's Army of the Shenandoah was still formally in existence and Sheridan acted independently, sometimes adding Crook's and Mackenzie's divisions and one or more Union Army infantry corps to his command, as ordered or approved by General Grant.) ordered them to move west and they eventually camped 7 miles (11 km) from Farmville and 7 miles (11 km) from Prospect Station. Brigadier General (Brevet Major General) Charles Griffin's V Corps arrived at Prince Edward Court House at about 7:30 p.m. and went into camp on the grounds of Hampden-Sydney College.

=== Lee's night march west ===
While Lee dealt with Grant's message, wagons continued west through roads that had become a quagmire from rain during the day and continued use, causing the death of some teams of mules and the burning of wagons that could not be moved. As the train moved on to the Richmond-Lynchburg Stage Road, conditions improved. Brigadier General Reuben Lindsay Walker had been moving the reserve artillery column independently of the main body of the Confederate army. He had moved through Cumberland Court House the previous afternoon. Having heard about the defeat at Sailor's Creek and the movement out of Farmville, Walker moved to the north, came to the Buckingham Plank Road and moved through Curdsville, Virginia about midday. There, the column moved toward New Store to the southwest and halted for the night, as did the wagon train and hospital train that had been moving from Farmville.

Lee knew that his army again had to make a night march from Cumberland Church to get ahead of the Union forces, obtain rations at Appomattox Station and possibly still escape to Danville via Campbell Court House (now Rustburg, Virginia) and through Pittsylvania County, Virginia. Longstreet's corps, with General Lee, moved via the Piedmont Coal Mine Road, also known as the Buckingham Plank Road through Curdsville toward a back road to New Store, Virginia. They covered the retreat of the last wagon train before withdrawing from the Cumberland Church area. Gordon's corps, followed by Fitzhugh Lee's cavalry, moved via the Richmond-Lynchburg Stage Road, a shorter route, toward New Store. Humphreys sent intelligence to Meade at about 3:00 p.m. that Confederate prisoners had said that the Army of Northern Virginia was headed for Lynchburg so Meade and Sheridan had good intelligence about Lee's plan. That night at Cumberland Church, Humphreys's men slept while Lee's force withdrew.

On the evening of April 7, Confederate Secretary of War John C. Breckinridge and the Confederacy's quartermaster general, commissary general, chief engineer and various War Department officials rode through Pamplin Station and saw the remainder of the supply trains from Farmville. The commissary general suggested the cars be moved because Union cavalry were not far from Pamplin but Breckinridge refused to do so without being able to notify Lee. On the next day, Crook's cavalry passed through Pamplin on their way to Appomattox Station and destroyed these cars.

General Humphreys stated in his book that the delay forced upon the Confederate Army by the engagement at Cumberland Church lost Lee valuable time. It led to the loss of Confederate supplies on April 8 when Custer's division of Sheridan's cavalry arrived at Appomattox Station first and captured the supply trains there. Custer's cavalry captured Confederate supplies and about 25 cannons and took about 1,000 prisoners at the Battle of Appomattox Station. The delay also allowed the Union cavalry and the V Corps and XXIV Corp to reach Appomattox Court House on the morning of April 9 in order to prevent a Confederate breakthrough toward Lynchburg.

== Preservation ==
The American Battlefield Trust and its partners acquired 46.8 acres of the battlefield in August 2022. It was the Trust's first acquisition at Cumberland Church.
