= Battle of Appomattox Station =

1865 battle of the American Civil War

Coordinates: 37°21′12.5″N 78°49′38.3″W

- Part of the American Civil War
Date	April 8, 1865
Location	Appomattox County, Virginia
Result	Union victory: Subsequent battle at Appomattox Court House the following day

Belligerents
United States (Union)	(Confederate States of America) Confederate States (Confederacy)

Commanders and leaders
George Armstrong Custer; David Hunter Strother; Edward Ord; Philip H. Sheridan	Reuben Lindsay Walker; Martin Witherspoon Gary

Units involved
Army of the Potomac, James and Shenandoah: 3rd U.S. Cavalry Division: 185th New York Infantry; 2nd and 15th New York Cavalry; 1st, 2nd and 3rd West Virginia Cavalry; 62nd and 67th Ohio Infantry; 39th Illinois Infantry; 87th and 199th Pennsylvsnia Infantry; 1st and 11th Maine Infantry	Army of Northern Virginia: 24th Virginia Infantry; 12th Virginia Cavalry; 1st North Carolina Sharpshooters; 4th and 14th North Carolina Infantry; 4th and 7th North Carolina Cavalry; 7th South Carolina Infantry; 7th Georgia Infantry; 5th Alabama Infantry

Strength
4,000	3,000

Casualties and losses
5–32 killed 40–86 wounded 3 missing (Note: The lower figures plus missing are Calkins's; the higher figures are Blair's.)	Unknown killed and wounded; ~1,000 captured

The Battle of Appomattox Station was fought during the Appomattox Campaign at the end of the American Civil War. A Union Army (Army of the Potomac, Army of the James, Army of the Shenandoah) cavalry division under the command of Brigadier General (Brevet Major General) George Armstrong Custer opposed Confederate Army of Northern Virginia artillery units commanded by Brigadier General Lindsay Walker with support from some dismounted cavalrymen, artillerymen armed with muskets and some stragglers on April 8, 1865, at Appomattox Station in Virginia.

Following the withdrawal of General Robert E. Lee's Army of Northern Virginia from their defenses at Petersburg, Virginia after the Battle of Five Forks, Third Battle of Petersburg and Battle of Sutherland's Station, the Union Army closely pursued the Confederates westward on parallel and trailing routes. The Confederates, short of rations and supplies, suffered numerous losses from desertion, straggling and battle, especially the Battle of Sailor's Creek on April 6, 1865. After the Battle of Cumberland Church on April 7, Lee's army made a third consecutive night march in an effort to stay ahead of the Union forces. Union cavalry under the command of Major General Philip H. Sheridan made a long ride of about 30 miles (48 km) on April 8, 1865 in order to capture Confederate supply trains at Appomattox Station and get ahead of the Confederates, cutting off their routes of retreat.

At the start of the action at Appomattox Station, between about 2:00 p.m. and 3:00 p.m. on April 8, the leading troopers of Company K, 2nd New York Cavalry Regiment rode up to three unguarded Confederate trains that had been sent from Lynchburg, Virginia with rations, ordnance and other supplies for the Army of Northern Virginia and forced them to surrender. The rest of the regiment and other troopers from the brigade of Colonel Alexander Pennington, Jr. soon rode into the station in support. Troopers with railroad experience ran the three trains east about 5 miles (8.0 km) to the camp of the Union Army of the James. A fourth locomotive and one or two cars escaped toward Lynchburg and at least one remaining car from that train was burned.

The reserve artillery of the Army of Northern Virginia, under the command of Third Corps artillery chief, Brigadier General Lindsay Walker was parked near the station and the Lynchburg stage road. The artillery was guarded by about 500 cavalrymen commanded by Brigadier General Martin Gary, supported by artillerymen of Captain Crispin Dickenson's Ringgold Battery and Captain David Walker's Otey Battery, who had been re-armed with muskets, and some stragglers gathered up in the vicinity by Lieutenant W. F. Robinson of the Ringgold Battery. Walker began to shell the station soon after he learned of the presence of Union cavalry there. Custer's men soon discovered the source of the firing about 2 miles (3.2 km) away and attacked Walker's artillery park near the Lynchburg stage road. Walker's men were concentrated there with about 25 guns arrayed in a semi-circle to defend themselves and another 35 to 75 guns parked in reserve.

After capturing the supply trains, the Union cavalry attacked the Confederate artillery batteries and their supporting dismounted cavalrymen, armed artillerymen and engineers and infantry stragglers. (Note: Historian Chris Calkins states that Brigadier General Martin Gary's 500 cavalrymen were the only support for Brigadier General Reuben Lindsay Walker's artillery and that Walker placed dismounted cavalry on either side of his guns. Calkins also wrote, however, that many of Walker's artillerymen were armed with muskets and acted as skirmishers. No regular infantry units were with Walker at the battle, but some stragglers were gather up by Lieutenant W. F. Robinson of the Ringgold Battery. Calkins, Chris. The Appomattox Campaign, March 29 – April 9, 1865. Conshohocken, PA: Combined Books, 1997. ISBN 978-0-938-28954-8. p. 154. See also Davis, Burke. To Appomattox: Nine April Days, 1865. New York: Eastern Acorn Press reprint, 1981. ISBN 978-0-915992-17-1. First published New York: Rinehart, 1959. p. 326. Marvel, William. Lee's Last Retreat: The Flight to Appomattox. Chapel Hill: University of North Carolina Press, 2002. ISBN 978-0-8078-5703-8. pp. 147–148.) (Note: Historian Burke Davis wrote that Gary's Brigade was in the midst of the fighting almost from the start and that the small arms of some 300 to 400 men were placed among the artillery's guns. Davis, 1981 (1959), pp. 324–325.) After making several futile charges in gathering darkness, the Union cavalry broke the Confederate defenses as the Confederates began to withdraw, taking as many guns and wagons with them as they could. After their breakthrough, Custer's men followed the fleeing Confederates in a running battle to the Lynchburg stage road, on which the Union troopers seized an important foothold.

Sheridan relieved Custer's tired men with the division of Major General George Crook after the fighting died down. Sheridan advised Union General-in-Chief Lieutenant General Ulysses S. Grant of the favorable outcome of his raid at the station and fight at the artillery park. Sheridan expressed his opinion that the Union forces could surround and crush the Confederates the next morning with infantry support. He urged Major General Edward Ord, who had been pushing and encouraging his men of the XXIV Corps and two brigades of the 2nd Division (Brigadier General (Brevet Major General) William Birney's division, temporarily under Gibbon's command) of the XXV Corps (African-Americans) of the Army of the James to keep as close as possible to the cavalry. He also ordered Brigadier General (Brevet Major General) Charles Griffin, whose V Corps was moving just behind Ord's men, to close up so the Confederates could not escape in the morning. (Note: Ord outranked Sheridan so technically Sheridan could not issue orders to Ord.)

== Background ==
=== Breakthrough at Petersburg ===
After an offensive begun on the night of March 28–March 29, 1865 that included the Battle of Lewis's Farm, Battle of White Oak Road and the Battle of Dinwiddie Court House, Lieutenant General Grant's Union Army group broke the Confederate defenses of Petersburg, Virginia at the Battle of Five Forks on April 1 and the Third Battle of Petersburg on April 2. A Union division under the command of Brigadier General Nelson A. Miles also broke up the last defense of the South Side Railroad at the Battle of Sutherland's Station on the afternoon of April 2, cutting off that railroad as a supply line or route of retreat for the Confederates. General Robert E. Lee's Army of Northern Virginia evacuated Petersburg and the Confederate capital of Richmond, Virginia on the night of April 2–3 and began a retreat with the intent of reaching Danville, Virginia and then linking up with General Joseph E. Johnston's army which was attempting to slow the advance the Union army group commanded by Major General William T. Sherman in North Carolina.

Much of the Army of Northern Virginia, local defense troops and a battalion of sailors as well as Confederate President Jefferson Davis and his cabinet, were able to escape from Petersburg and Richmond just in advance of the Union troops entering those cities on April 3 because Confederate rear guard forces, especially at Forts Gregg and Whitworth, Fort Mahone and Sutherland's Station, fought desperate delaying actions on April 2 to give most of the Confederates a head start on Union Army pursuers.

=== Flight to Amelia Court House; Battles of Namozine Church, Beaver Pond Creek ===
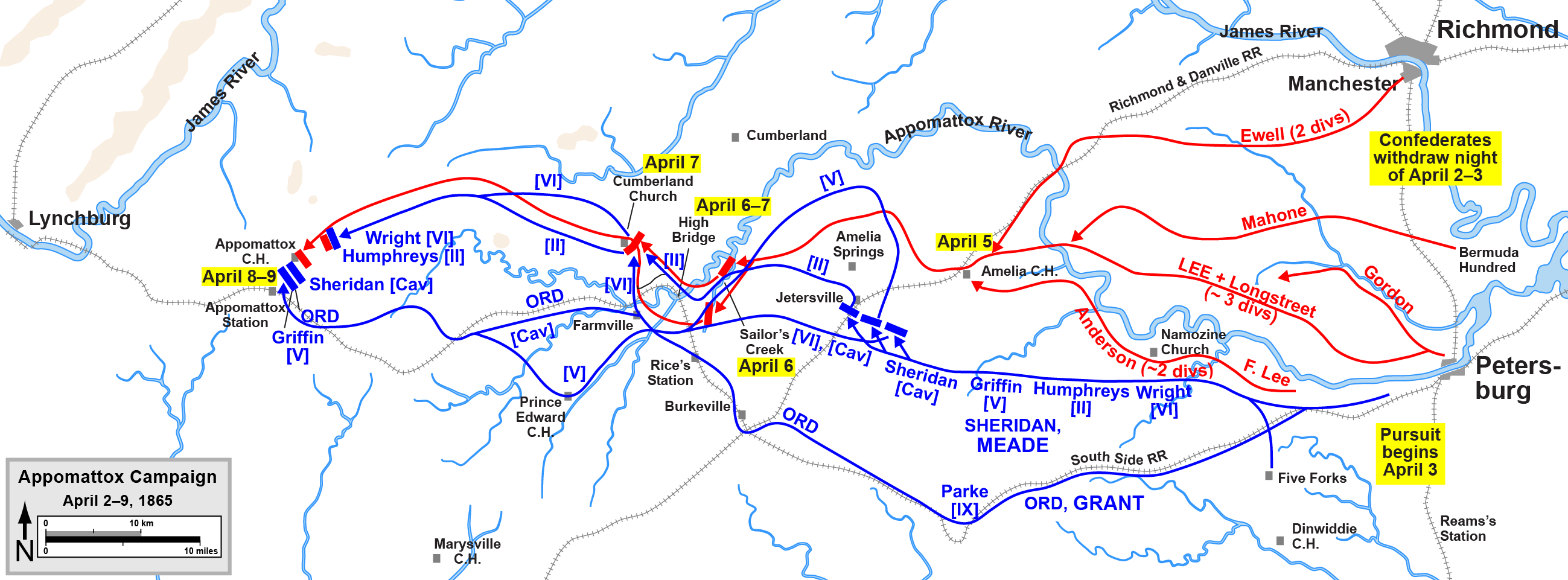
Lee's retreat in the Appomattox Campaign, April 2–9, 1865.

While most of Lee's army had an effective one day head start on their march, the advance cavalry and infantry corps of the Union Army under the command of Major General Philip Sheridan were able to keep Lee's forces to their north by pursuing Lee on a parallel course to their south. Union cavalry harassed and skirmished with Confederate units almost from the beginning of Lee's army's flight from Petersburg. On April 3, 1865, advance units of the Union cavalry under the command of Brigadier General (Brevet Major General) George Armstrong Custer fought with rear guard Confederate cavalry at the Battle of Namozine Church. On April 4, 1865, the opposing forces skirmished at Beaver Pond Creek or Tabernacle Church (Note: This should not be confused with the 1862 Battle of Beaver Dam Creek or Battle of Mechanicsville.) and at Amelia Court House. Meanwhile, Sheridan's forces occupied Jetersville, Virginia and Burkeville Junction, Virginia, an important railroad junction.

General Lee first planned to reunite the four columns of his army marching from Petersburg and Richmond and to resupply them at Amelia Court House, Virginia, 39 miles (63 km) southwest of Richmond. Lee's men left their positions in Petersburg and Richmond with only one day's rations. Lee expected to find a supply train of rations that he had ordered brought to Amelia Court House to meet the army at that location. When he arrived at Amelia Court House, Lee found only ordnance, but no rations, in the supply trains. He delayed a day to allow his men to forage in the area but he also could not move without leaving part of his army behind as all the troops did not reach Amelia Court House until the next morning.

=== Battle of Amelia Springs or Painesville ===
On the morning of April 5, Sheridan sent Brigadier General Henry E. Davies's brigade of Major General George Crook's division to scout for Confederate movements beyond Amelia Court House near Paineville, or Paine's Cross Roads, about 5 miles (8.0 km) north of Amelia Springs. About 4 miles (6.4 km) east of Paineville, Davies found and attacked a wagon train that had left Richmond with provisions for Lee's army, including food, ammunition and headquarters baggage, which was guarded by Brigadier General Martin Gary's cavalry brigade. Coincidentally, Davies came across another wagon train with excess artillery from Amelia Court House approaching his position from the south.

After burning many of Confederate wagons including headquarters wagons, capturing horses, mules and some artillery pieces, and taking 630 prisoners, at Paineville or Paine's Cross Roads, Davies began to return to Jetersville. Major General Fitzhugh Lee with the Confederate cavalry divisions of Major General Thomas L. Rosser and Colonel Thomas T. Munford assaulted the Union cavalry on their return, starting a running fight from north of Amelia Springs to within 1 mile (1.6 km) of Jetersville. Reaching as far as Amelia Springs, the other brigades of Crook's division under Brigadier General J. Irvin Gregg and Colonel (Brevet Brigadier General) Charles H. Smith provided reinforcements, allowing Davies's force to reach Jetersville with their prisoners, guns and teams. Starting to move his army toward Jetersville at 1:00 p.m., with Lieutenant General James Longstreet's First Corps in the lead, Lee discovered that his route to Danville was blocked by fast-moving Union cavalry. Lee decided that he could not bring up his army fast enough to fight their way through before large numbers of Union infantry would arrive.

On the night of April 5, the Army of Northern Virginia, with Longstreet's corps again in the lead, marched toward Rice's Station, Virginia where they expected to receive further supplies. Due to the long slow-moving Confederate wagon trains, the wet conditions and the limited number of roads, Lee's corps followed one another in a long procession. On the morning of April 6, Longstreet's corps reached Rice's Station where they were joined by General Lee and Major General Fitzhugh Lee's cavalry. They were resupplied from trains that had reached that point and waited there for the other units to catch up. With Union forces approaching later in the day, the trains with their remaining rations and supplies were sent to Farmville, Virginia, further to the west.

=== Battles of High Bridge, Sailor's Creek, Rice's Station ===
At Burkeville or Burke's Junction, Virginia on the night of April 5, Lieutenant General Grant ordered Major General Ord to destroy High Bridge, the South Side Railroad bridge and underlying wagon bridge over the Appomattox River about 4 miles (6.4 km) east of Farmville, as well as the railroad and wagon bridges at Farmville. His purpose was to hinder or prevent the movement of Lee's army to Danville or Lynchburg and confine them to the south side of the river. Before dawn on April 6, Ord sent his headquarters cavalry, composed of 80 men of the 4th Regiment of Cavalry, Massachusetts Volunteers under Colonel Francis Washburn and two small infantry regiments under the overall command of Colonel (Brevet Brigadier General) Theodore Read of his staff to burn the bridges if they were not too well guarded. (Note: Humphreys, 1883, p. 378 erroneously identifies the cavalrymen as from the 5th Regiment Massachusetts Colored Volunteer Cavalry, but they were left at Petersburg when Ord's force joined the pursuit of the Army of Northern Virginia. Calkins, 1997, p. 101 and Marvel, 2002, p. 71 correctly identify the unit as Companies I, L and M of the 4th Massachusetts Cavalry Regiment.) Later learning that at least part of Lee's army was at Rice's Station near High Bridge, Ord tried unsuccessfully to warn Read that he likely would face a much larger force if he continued. Longstreet did send a large force to save High Bridge and after a fierce fight in which several top officers on both sides were killed or wounded, the Confederates saved the bridge and captured the entire surviving Union force.

Despite Grant's and Sheridan's view that Lee's army would be in motion to the west, on the morning of April 6, Army of the Potomac commander Major General George Meade sent his three corps northeast toward Amelia Court House in order to intercept the Confederate force, which he believed would have to remain there over night. Brigadier General (Brevet Major General) Gershom Mott's division of Major General Andrew A. Humphreys's II Corps came across the rear of the Confederate Army moving west of Amelia Court House. Brigadier General (Brevet Major General) Nelson A. Miles's division brought up some artillery and opened fire on the Confederate column as they marched out of sight. Humphreys's corps then began a running battle with Major General John B. Gordon's Second Corps over a 14 miles (23 km) distance ending at one of three actions that were part of the Battle of Sailor's Creek. As night approached, Humphreys's corps destroyed many wagons, took 13 flags and 3 guns and reported taking 1,700 prisoners as the rest of Gordon's disorganized men headed for High Bridge.

Meanwhile, Lieutenant General Richard H. Anderson's corps repulsed an attack by Major General George Crook's cavalry division at J. Holt's House where the road forked to Rice's Station or down to Sailor's Creek. Reinforced by Brigadier General (Brevet Major General) Wesley Merritt's two divisions under Brigadier Generals George Armstrong Custer and Thomas Devin, Crook's division attacked again but was again driven off by Anderson's men who were reinforced by part of the trailing corps of Lieutenant General Richard S. Ewell. Most of the Union cavalry moved parallel to the Confederate line of march. Custer's division found a gap in the Confederate line of march caused by Longstreet moving ahead of the slower wagon train and Anderson's trailing corps. Custer's troopers blocked the road while destroying a large number of wagons and capturing 12 guns.

Union Colonel Peter Stagg's brigade of Brigadier General Thomas Devin's cavalry division joined with Major General Horatio Wright's VI Corps in an attack on Ewell's stalled division. The Union forces caught up to Anderson's and Ewell's corps, who were without artillery, as the Confederates were positioned almost back-to-back near Sailor's Creek. Ewell's corps was almost surrounded and all but about 250 of his men from a reported 3,400 men then in the corps were casualties, mostly captured. Anderson lost about 2,600 men out of 6,300. Eight generals were captured including Ewell and Lee's son, Major General George Washington Custis Lee.

=== Battles of Second High Bridge, Farmville, Cumberland Church ===
During the day on April 7, Major General Ord moved up to Rice's Station and fought a minor battle, the Battle of Rice's Station, with Lieutenant General Longstreet's entrenched men. Having suffered 66 casualties, Ord called off the attack as darkness approached, apparently worried that the entire Confederate Army was present and that he should wait for reinforcements. Longstreet's corps and Major General Fitzhugh Lee's cavalry moved out toward Farmville during the night. When Ord discovered the Confederates had left Rice's Station during the night, he pursued them toward Farmville. Sheridan also sent Crook's cavalry division to Farmville.

Confederate Major General William Mahone's division of Longstreet's corps had been stationed near Sailor's Creek about nightfall to cover the withdrawal of the survivors of the battle there. On the morning of April 7, Humphreys's II Corps left the Sailor's Creek battlefield in time to reach High Bridge before the fleeing Confederates, including Mahone's division, could destroy the wagon bridge. Humphreys's divisions pursued Mahone and Gordon on separate roads toward Farmville. Brigadier General Francis Barlow's division cut off part of Gordon's wagon train and destroyed many wagons but Brigadier General Thomas A. Smyth was mortally wounded, which stunned his men and temporarily stalled the Union attack. Colonel William A. Olmsted's brigade moved to support Smyth's brigade but about 100 of his men were captured as Confederates attacked an isolated group while Smyth's troops were hesitating to move due to the loss of their commander.

After receiving rations at Farmville, Longstreet's corps crossed to the north side of the Appomattox River, destroying the Farmville bridges as General Lee ordered, but leaving the Confederate cavalry and an infantry brigade to find a ford to cross. Although rations were not fully distributed, the Confederate trains were directed to Pamplin's Station with the intention of keeping them from being captured or destroyed but the remaining supplies were destroyed by Crook's cavalry passing through Pamplin the next day in any event. Crook's cavalry division and the VI Corps occupied Farmville as Longstreet's men left. Due to high water and lack of crossings, Crook's cavalry division was the only Union unit able to cross the river at a nearby ford that afternoon.

By the afternoon of April 7, Mahone and Gordon had entrenched on high ground at Cumberland Church and soon were joined by the remainder of the Confederate Army. Upon his II Corps being shelled when they approached the Confederate line, Humphreys attacked the Confederate position bringing on the Battle of Cumberland Church. Not realizing that other Union infantry could not cross the Appomattox River at Farmville and reinforce him, Humphreys made a second futile attack when he heard the sound of battle nearby, which he thought was another Union infantry attack on the Confederate line. He had heard what has sometimes been called the Battle of Farmville rather than part of the Battle of Cumberland Church, which was an engagement between part of Crook's cavalry division and Confederate cavalry guarding a wagon train headed west. (Note: The entire battle near Farmville and at Cumberland Church also has been called the Battle of Farmville in some sources.) The Confederate cavalry surprised the leading Union troopers and inflicted 74 casualties, among which were many prisoners including Union Brigadier General J. Irvin Gregg. Either the Confederates drove the Union force back across the river, or coincidentally at about this time, Sheridan recalled Crook to Farmville and, in any event, Sheridan directed Crook to move his division to Prospect Station, 10 or 12 miles (16 or 19 km) west of Farmville. Crook's division arrived at Prospect Station about midnight.

Barlow's division came to the Cumberland Church battlefield only at about sunset. As night approached and he was not reinforced, Humphreys discontinued the battle, having suffered 571 casualties. The Confederates had now put themselves in a position where they were 8 miles (13 km) further from their next possible supply point at Appomattox Station than were the Union troops at Farmville and they also had been delayed by the battle at Cumberland Church.

Before the Confederates departed from the vicinity of Cumberland Church on the night of April 7, the first of Grant's letters to Lee asking for the surrender of Lee's army was delivered to Lee and declined by him as not yet necessary. In reply, Lee did ask what terms Grant would offer upon his army's surrender.

During the night, the Confederates withdrew again for a third night march which ended at and just east of Appomattox Court House the following afternoon. After two or three hours rest, Humphreys's corps pursued the Confederates for 26 miles (42 km) to within 3 miles (4.8 km) of Longstreet's rear guard where on the morning of April 9 Humphreys had to stop to rest his men and allow his ration train to catch up.

Confederate Brigadier General Lindsay Walker's Third Corps reserve artillery train was the first unit to leave the Cumberland Church area at 1:00 a.m. on April 8. Walker, with some gunners converted to infantry and a guard of about 500 cavalrymen under Brigadier General Martin Gary arrived in the vicinity of Appomattox Station, about 3 miles (4.8 km) west of Appomattox Court House on April 8 between 2:00 p.m. and 3:00 p.m. Gordon's corps stopped about 1 mile (1.6 km) east of Appomattox Court House at about 3:00 p.m. while the rest of the Confederate army spread out for 10 miles (16 km).

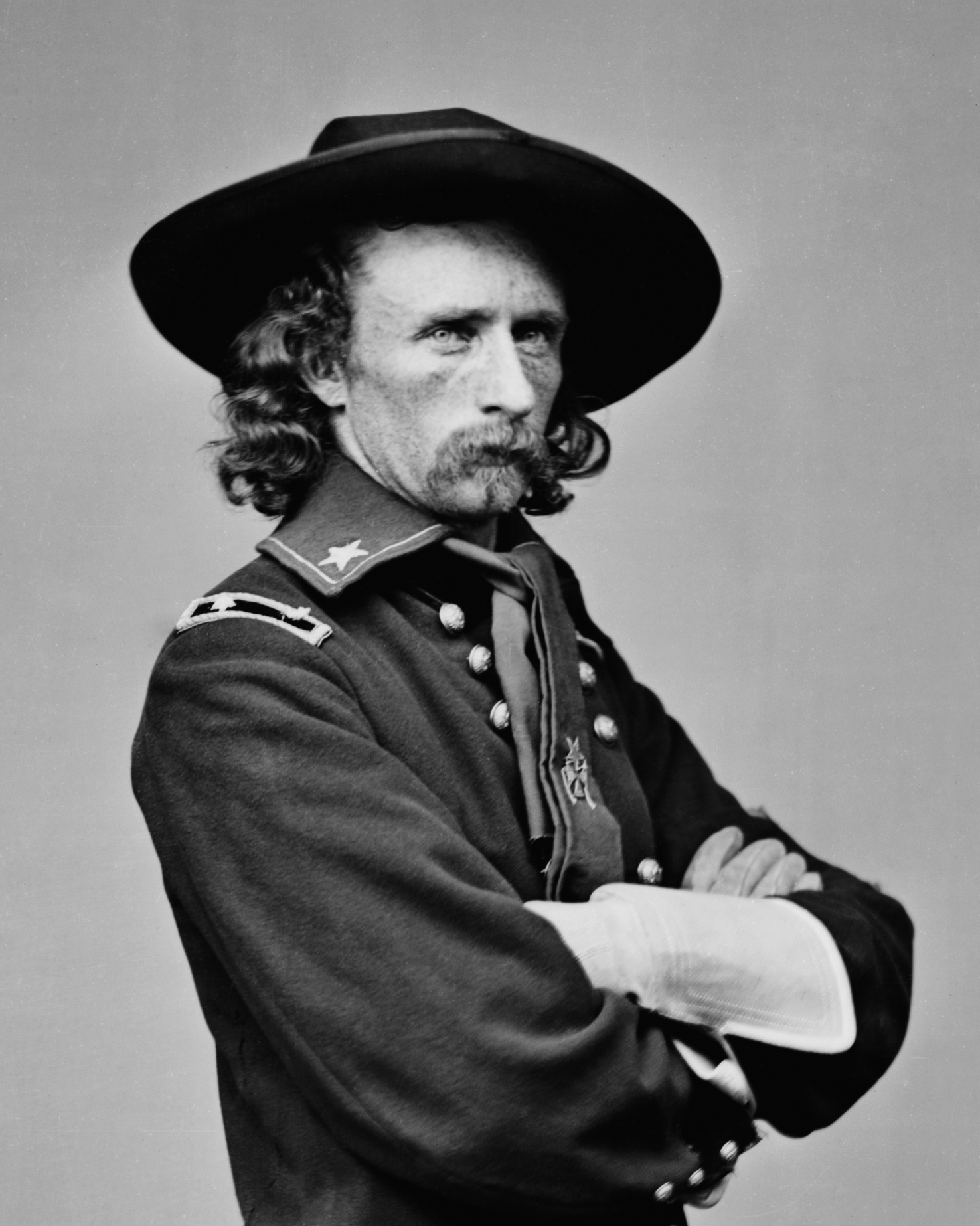
Brigadier General (Brevet Major General) George Armstrong Custer

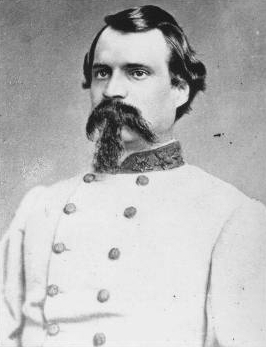
Brigadier General Reuben Lindsay Walker

=== Custer's division rides to Appomattox Station ===
After the Battle of Sailor's Creek, Grant decided that he had to guard against a Confederate effort to escape to Danville by moving to the south toward Keysville, Virginia. He sent Sheridan's (Merritt's), Crook's and Brigadier General Ranald Mackenzie's cavalry, followed by Griffin's V Corps, Gibbon's XXIV Corps and two brigades of William Birney's 2nd Division of XXV Corps, also under Gibbon, to Prince Edward Court House, Virginia (present day Worsham, Virginia). Sheridan ordered Merritt's cavalry (Custer's and Devin's divisions) to move to Buffalo Creek and Spring Creek, 7 miles (11 km) south of Farmville and 4 miles (6.4 km) from Prospect Station where they went into bivouac for the night. Mackenzie's force was consolidated with Crook's division which was camped at Prospect Station.

On the morning of April 8, George Crook's division led the way along the railroad toward Appomattox Court House. About 3 miles (4.8 km) out of Prospect Station, Wesley Merritt's command, consisting of George Armstrong Custer's and Thomas Devin's divisions, headed cross country toward Appomattox Station while Crook's division continued along the railroad to Pamplin's Station (or Pamplin's Depot), where they took all of the supplies they could from the trains that had been diverted from Farmville the day before. (Note: Marvel, 2002, p. 142 says that the three trains at Pamplin Station were empty and that the trains at Appomattox were the trains diverted from Farmville. This diverges from other accounts which state that the trains at Appomattox came from Lynchburg while the Farmville trains were found at Pamplin Station. For example, Starr, 2007 (1981), pp. 477–478 states that the rations at Appomattox Station were those "sent from Lynchburg to meet Lee, in response to the orders of his commissary general which Sheridan had intercepted at Jetersville, and then forwarded to their destination; Calkins, 1997, p. 152–153 identifies the trains at Appomattox Station as "the ration and supply trains from Lynchburg.")

Soon after the Union cavalry had moved out of Prospect Station on April 8, Sheridan's scouts, dressed in Confederate uniforms, reported to him that eight, later found to be only four, trains had arrived at Appomattox Station. Sheridan expected these trains to arrive in the vicinity because the scouts had intercepted Lee's order for rations to be sent to him along the route. They forwarded the order to Lynchburg in anticipation that the trains could be captured before the Confederates reached the station. Custer and Devin were informed about the cars at Appomattox Station and ordered to reach there as soon as possible, prompting Custer and Devin to attempt a faster cross-country move with Sheridan himself joining Custer's division. Sheridan continued to ride with Custer as Custer's division took the lead in the ride toward the station. (Note: Starr, 2007 (1981), p. 480 states that the Union cavalry made excellent time in their 20 miles (32 km) ride from Prospect Station to Appomattox Station.) After a further 7 miles (11 km) ride from Prospect Station to Walker's Church, Sheridan sent a message to Crook to ride to Appomattox Station and to assault the trains if he arrived first.

Meanwhile, Major General Ord urged and inspired his men of the XXIV Corps and two brigades of the 2nd Division of the XXV Corps (African-Americans) of the Army of the James, followed by Griffin's V Corps, to follow the cavalry as quickly as they could in an effort to cut off the Confederates at Appomattox Station. As Brigadier General E. P. Alexander told General Lee at Cumberland Church, the Union forces south of the Appomattox River had a shorter route to Appomattox Station. (Note: The infantry marched on the sides of the road while their wagons and artillery moved on the roads. Calkins, 1997, p. 151.)

=== Capture of supply trains ===
Colonel Alexander Pennington, Jr.'s brigade of Custer's division led the Union cavalry to the South Side Railroad at Evergreen Station, then moved 6 miles (9.7 km) more to the west to Appomattox Station, present day Appomattox, Virginia. Here, Pennington's lead unit, Company K of the 2nd Regiment New York Volunteer Cavalry would find the four trains of railroad cars which contained rations and other quartermaster supplies, including shoes, clothes, canteens, medical supplies and ordnance.

Three of the trains were captured by four men of Company K, 2nd New York Cavalry Regiment, who rode up to the train engineers and ordered them to surrender, which they did since only a few Confederate engineers of Colonel T. M. R. Talcott's command were the only soldiers near the station. (Note: Calkins, 1997, p. 153 wrote that most of the engineers probably had no weapons.) (Note: Longacre, 2003, p. 171 states that most of Gary's cavalrymen were patrolling the Lynchburg–Richmond stage road toward Appomattox Court House.) (Note: Tremain, 1904, pp. 216–217 states that the Appomattox Station was defended by a squad of cavalry and Custer's men surrounded and captured the trains by quick maneuvering before any force could appear to defend the trains or the trains could steam away. At pp. 223–224, Tremain states that four picked men initially held up the trains and were soon joined by other companies of the 2nd New York Cavalry as troopers from Gary's Confederate cavalry rode up to contest the trains' capture. At p. 224, Tremain identifies Fred E. Blodgett, a 16-year-old trooper of the 2nd New York Cavalry as the first soldier who held up the leading train. Jamieson, 2015, p. 161 also states that a few troopers of Company K, 2nd New York Cavalry captured three of the four trains with one locomotive and a few cars escaping toward Lynchburg.) In his account of the battle, Colonel Alanson Merwin Randol commanding the 2nd New York Cavalry said that the cars had been partially unloaded and were preparing to move away when Custer ordered Randol to capture the trains. (Note: Colonel Randol does not mention the four leading troopers. Marvel, 2003, p. 171 does mention the four lead men and states that the rest of the regiment, then the rest of Pennington's brigade followed those advance men.) The locomotive and one or two cars of one of the trains escaped toward Lynchburg before Custer's men could tear up the track in front of it to prevent its escape. The remaining car or cars of that train were burned. After Randol's men stopped the three other trains from getting away, they gathered both white and black prisoners, many from Confederate quartermaster and commissary details. Dismounted men from Pennington's brigade took control of the station and area.

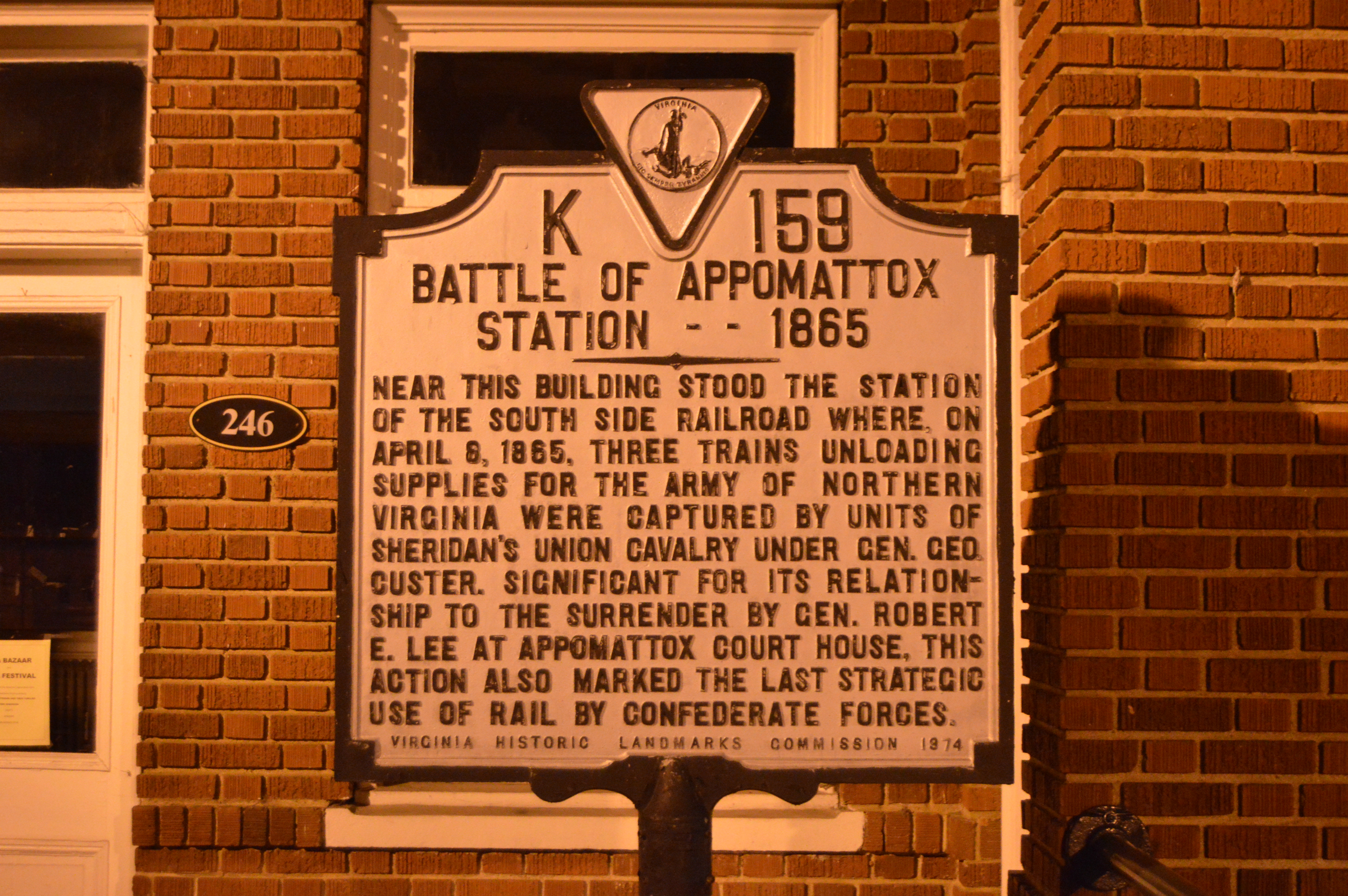
Historical marker in Appomattox commemorating the battle

Soon after the Union cavalrymen had captured the trains, Confederate artillery began to fire at the station. Colonel Randol reported that the regiment suffered little damage from the artillery fire because the artillery had to fire through dense woods between the artillery park and the station. When Colonel Randol called for troopers with train operating experience to move the trains, enough men came forward to move the cars along the track to a position out of danger a few miles to the east toward Farmville within the Union lines. At least two of the volunteers were from the 2nd West Virginia Cavalry Regiment of Colonel Henry Capehart's brigade. (Note: In 1883, Sheridan wrote: "The railroad trains had been secured in the first onset, and were taken possession of by locomotive engineers, soldiers in the command, whose delight at again getting at their former employment was so great that they produced the wildest confusion by running the trains to and fro on the track, and making such as unearthly screeching with the whistles, that I was at one time on the point of ordering them burnt; but we finally got them off, and ran them to our rear ten or fifteen miles (16 km or 24 km), to Ord and Gibbon, who with the infantry were following the cavalry. The cavalry continued the fighting nearly all that night, driving the enemy back to the vicinity of Appomattox Court-house, a distance of about four miles (6.4 km), thus giving him no repose, and covering the weakness of the attacking force." Sheridan, P. H. "The Last Days of the Rebellion" in The North American Review. Vol. 137, No. 320 (Jul., 1883), p. 13. Published by: University of Northern Iowa. JSTOR 2511828) The Confederate battery that had targeted the train and station later was captured when the Union cavalry assaulted the nearby Confederate wagon and artillery park. When Gary's cavalry detachment arrived at the railroad soon after the Union cavalry had taken control of the station, they were driven back toward Walker's position.

Pennington's men of the 2nd New York Volunteer Cavalry Regiment were soon joined by the 3rd New Jersey Volunteer Cavalry Regiment in their defense of the station. According to Major Henry Edwin Tremain, the two Union regiments had to hold off a larger force of Confederate cavalry until nearly dark when the main body of Custer's division arrived to reinforce them. Historian William Marvel says the 2nd Ohio Cavalry was the second regiment to join the 2nd New York Cavalry, with the 3rd New Jersey Cavalry soon to follow so that, inconsistent with Tremain's account, three Union regiments held the depot rather than two. In any event, the Union cavalry drove the Confederates back toward Walker's artillery position. Pennington's advance regiments followed the retreating Confederates as they moved toward the Lynchburg stage road between Lynchburg and Appomattox Court House with sunset approaching.

=== Attack on artillery park ===
The Lynchburg stage road, about 2 miles (3.2 km) north of the railroad station, was the main route between Appomattox Court House and Lynchburg that was available to Lee's army. Near Appomattox Station, along the Lynchburg road, the Confederates had parked a hospital train, a large group of wagons and about 100 artillery pieces. (Note: Tremain, 1886, p. 217 wrote that the Confederates had between 25 and 50 artillery pieces. Other accounts suggest this was the number that Walker put into action, not the total.) A small infantry unit, mostly armed artillerymen, and the 500-man cavalry detachment of Brigadier General Martin Gary's command guarded the wagon park.

At about 4:00 p.m., the sounds of the attack at Appomattox Station had alerted Walker to the approach of the Union cavalry and he put Martin Gary's dismounted cavalry on his flanks, armed artillerymen out front as skirmishers and about two dozen of his guns arrayed in an arc on a rise facing the station. The area in which the Confederate artillery was located and over which the Union cavalry had to operate was cut through with wagon roads and overgrown with timber and underbrush. It was a poor location for either cavalry or artillery to fight in, especially after dark. In their haste to defend themselves, the Confederate artillerymen fired into their own men, killing or wounding several of them before the artillerymen realized their mistake. After the Union regiments came within striking distance of the Confederate camp, the makeshift Confederate infantry skirmishers fired on them. The Union men nonetheless proceeded with a poorly organized attack of about 400 men against the main Confederate artillery position and were driven back.

Custer's entire First Brigade under Colonel Pennington then came forward behind a large group of skirmishers and continued the uncoordinated attack started by his lead regiments. They also were driven back by the Confederate skirmishers and artillery. Undeterred by these setbacks, Custer was determined to capture the Confederate artillery and hold a position on the Lynchburg road. After Colonel Henry Capehart's Third Brigade followed Pennington's men on to the field, Custer sent all of his men against the Confederate position. Nearly 50 Union troopers were felled by canister used by the Confederate artillerymen. When Colonel (Brevet Brigadier General) William Wells's Second Brigade arrived, Custer continued the attack as dark came on, even though thick woods sheltered the Confederate position. Even with the addition of Wells's brigade another Union assault failed. Historian William Marvel credits the support of Gary's troopers and Colonel T. M. R. Talcott's (armed) engineers along with Walker's heavy ordnance for the strong showing and lengthy holdout by Walker's men.

Custer then personally led an assault with his entire force but without a breakthrough. (Note: Starr, 2007 (1981) says that Custer led nearly a dozen charges.) At about 9:00 p.m., under the light of a full moon, Custer's entire division again assaulted and finally broke the Confederate line. The Confederates began to withdraw, abandoning many of their active guns, caissons and baggage wagons which then were captured by Custer's men. The gradual dispersal of Walker's cannons and men and the withdrawal of Gary's and Talcott's men weakened Walker's remaining defense to the point of collapse upon Custer's final charge.

The Confederate withdrawal from the Lynchburg stage road at this location allowed the Union cavalry to occupy a segment of the road and block the Confederate escape route toward Lynchburg. The Appomattox River was not fordable in this vicinity, which prevented a Confederate escape to the north, an option without much possible benefit in any event. Union troops blocked the Army of Northern Virginia's movements in the other directions.

According to historian Chris Calkins, Custer's casualties were 5 killed, 40 wounded and 3 missing, but most of the wounds suffered were severe. As reported by Tremain: "Surgeons of wide experience in the cavalry remarked that they never treated so many extreme cases in so short a fight. The wounds were chiefly made by artillery, and were serious; many patients being badly mangled." Jayne Blair gives Custer's losses at 118, consisting of 32 killed and 86 wounded. (Note: Calkins may have been referring to the casualties in Custer's main charge against the artillery, which could reconcile his figures with Blair's.)

When their defense broke, some Confederates fled down the road to Lynchburg while others retreated toward Appomattox Court House. When the retreating artillerymen stopped to fire at the Union cavalry from both directions, a group of Custer's cavalrymen broke up this further Confederate resistance.

Custer's troopers continued to advance toward Appomattox Court House until they encountered infantry in their path. (Note: Marvel, 2002, p. 175–176 states that Gary's dismounted troopers initially held off the Union cavalrymen and that they ran into a skirmish line from Brigadier General William Henry Wallace's brigade just west of town.) Custer then ordered the artillery and valuable contents captured from the wagon train to be sent south of the railroad station while the rest of his men established a line to block the road where they had been halted. The captured material included between 24 and 30 guns and about 150 to 200 wagons, mostly filled with baggage. Custer's men took almost 1,000 prisoners, including Brigadier General Young Marshall Moody who was ill and riding in a hospital wagon. On the other hand, Walker's men saved about 75 cannons during the battle and their retreat.

Devin's division had come up in support of Custer's division but had not been seriously engaged. Devin's troops relieved Custer's men along the road, where they set up defensive lines facing Appomattox Court House and Lynchburg. Custer's men then turned to the task of clearing the field before trying to sleep for the rest of the night.

=== Root's last charge ===
Custer wanted to locate the main body of Lee's troops so he either sent the 15th Regiment New York Volunteer Cavalry, led by Lieutenant Colonel Augustus J. Root, to make a final charge along the pike toward Appomattox Court House or Root took off on his own initiative, depending on the account. (Note: Colonel Randol states that a mixed group of troopers, mainly his 2nd New York Cavalry, made the last charge on the Confederate artillery position and after the position was taken, the whole division rode on toward Appomattox Court House until they stopped due to the large number of campfires in front of them. Root, however, rode into Appomattox Court House where he was shot by a picket. Randol, 1886, p. 8. Marvel, 2002, p. 149 states that it appears that Root made the ride into Appomattox Court House on his own initiative.) Root's men caused some havoc along the line of retreating artillery, gunners, wagons and stragglers as they rode into the small town. Root and at least one other man were killed and one or more other Union troopers were wounded in their foray into town. (Note: Marvel, 2002, p. 149 writes that Major Shesh Howe of the 1st West Virginia Volunteer Cavalry Regiment was killed in an earlier charge against Walker's skirmishers. One of the early accounts is not clear about the exact location of Howe's death.) According to Volume 5, "Confederate Military History," by former Confederate Brigadier General Ellison Capers, Jacob David Felder of Bamberg, South Carolina, a private in Company H, Hampton's Legion, fired the fatal shot at Root after Root had fired at Felder first and narrowly missed. Historian William Marvel states that Root had ridden through the town with some daring troopers behind him when a few curious disorganized stragglers fired into the approaching horsemen. (Note: Schaff, 1912, p. 194, Longacre, 2003, p. 176 and others state that the volley which killed Root was made from Wallace's brigade. Longacre states that Root was followed into town by about a dozen men.) (Note: Tremain, 1904, p. 232, Longacre, 2003, p. 176 and others state that Root's body, stripped of all clothing, or all outer garments, was still in the road at the time of the surrender.)

The gunfire in the town roused Bushrod Johnson's division and about 1,000 of his men marched into town. (Note: General Lee had relieved Lieutenant General Richard H. Anderson of command on April 8. Contemporary accounts, including one by Lee's chief of staff, Lieutenant Colonel Walter Taylor, also state that Major Generals Bushrod Johnson and George Pickett were relieved of command when Anderson was relieved of command. Historian William Marvel states that no written documents confirm this, yet Anderson and Johnson (indirectly) acknowledged their relief. Sometime on April 8, Gordon replaced Johnson with Brigadier General William Henry Wallace. Marvel, 2002, pp. 214–217.) At the edge of town, the Confederate soldiers again laid down to wait and sleep if they could. Meanwhile, the New York cavalrymen already were leading a group of prisoners and some abandoned wagons and caissons back to the Union lines. Custer's and Devin's divisions stayed awake until midnight gathering food and souvenirs and clearing the area of the road which they then held. (Note: Tremain, 1904, p. 131 and Schaff, 1912, p. 198 state that Custer then went to visit his wounded men.)

Crook's division arrived at the battlefield after the fighting was over. Sheridan later ordered Crook to send a brigade toward Appomattox Court House to watch the Confederates so the Union force would be on alert to prevent the Confederates from escaping by another route.

== Aftermath ==
=== Army of Northern Virginia blocked ===
Sheridan sent a message to Grant about the day's operations at 9:20 p.m. and he also urged Major General Edward Ord with the Army of the James and Brigadier General (Brevet Major General) Charles Griffin with the V Corps to press ahead with all possible energy in order to cut off the Confederate avenue of escape at Appomattox. The lead units of the infantry columns reached Appomattox Station about 2:00 a.m. on April 9, although most of the infantry came up later in the morning while the cavalry were holding back the Confederate escape attempt.

The marches and movements of the Union cavalry and the XXIV Corps, V Corps and African-American men of the XXV Corps on April 8 to get ahead of the Army of Northern Virginia on their route west, as well as the efforts of the II Corps and VI Corps to press the Confederates from behind, led to the Confederate army being effectively surrounded on April 9.

=== Confederate reaction ===
Lee and his principal subordinates knew that the sound of gunfire from the direction of Appomattox Station on April 8 meant that Union cavalry were ahead of them. After discussing the situation with Lieutenant General Longstreet and Major Generals Gordon and Fitzhugh Lee, including mentioning Grant's generous term of parole of the army upon its surrender to them, General Lee decided to attempt a breakthrough toward Lynchburg on the morning of April 9 if his army only had to confront Union cavalry. If Union infantry were also ahead of them, they would need to reconsider their actions. Gordon and Fitzhugh Lee were assigned the task of clearing the Union troopers off the road to Lynchburg. Lee wanted to press on for Danville by an indirect route through Campbell Court House. The plan was for the Confederate troops to hurry through the Union cavalry blockade with only essential supplies. The wagon train would head toward Lynchburg by a circuitous route without an escort. Surplus wagons and supplies again would be burned. If Union infantry also blocked the way, Lee asked his subordinates to inform him so a flag of truce could be sent to Grant "to accede to the only alternative left to us."

=== Union position ===
Upon Sheridan's order, Crook sent Colonel (Brevet Brigadier General) Charles H. Smith's brigade of Crook's division to set up on a commanding ridge across the Lynchburg stage road west of Appomattox, just west of the Oakville Road. Smith had four regiments, the 1st Maine Volunteer Cavalry Regiment, 2nd Regiment New York Mounted Rifles, 6th Ohio Cavalry Regiment and 13th Ohio Cavalry Regiment, and 2 guns of Lord's 2nd United States Artillery Regiment. Custer's and Devin's divisions were at Appomattox Station for deployment in support.

=== Union infantry's march ===
About 10:00 p.m., Brigadier General John W. Turner's division of Major General John Gibbon's XXIV Corps of Major General Edward O. C. Ord's Army of the James reached the road crossing with the South Side Railroad about 3 miles (4.8 km) from Appomattox Station, having marched 30 miles (48 km) since dawn. Turner's troops stopped at the location where the trains captured at Appomattox Station had been sent. Brigadier General Robert S. Foster's division arrived at camp about an hour later, followed by African-American troops from two brigades of the 2d Division of XXV Corps. (Note: One of these brigades was raised in Pennsylvania while the men of the other brigade were from New York, Kentucky and Illinois. A large number of these men had never been slaves. Marvel, 2002, p. 155.) Historian Edward Longacre noted that the XXV Corps showed extraordinary endurance in marching the farthest of any Union unit that day. When Brigadier General Charles Griffin's V Corps arrived behind Ord's force, they camped with empty haversacks, too far back on the road to benefit from the provisions captured at Appomattox Station.

=== Grant and Lee ===
Generals Grant and Meade, who had traveled with the II Corps in their pursuit of Gordon's corps on April 8, stayed at Clifton, a plantation 4.5 miles (7.2 km) from New Store that night. (Note: Marvel, 2002, p. 137. This should not be confused with the town of Clifton in Fairfax County, Virginia.) Humphreys's VI Corps also caught up and camped at New Store that night. Although Grant had been in a good mood in the morning on April 8, he was suffering from a migraine headache by the afternoon and into the night.

Lee was about 16 miles (26 km) ahead of Grant. He replied to Grant's further message with an evasive answer in which he said he merely wondered what the terms would be if he surrendered, not that the time had come for that. He offered to meet Grant on the stage road at the rear of his army at 10:00 a.m. on April 9. Lee realized he would know by then if his army could escape and, if not, he would have no alternative but to surrender the army or face its annihilation.

== Battlefield preservation ==
The Civil War Trust (a division of the American Battlefield Trust) and its partners have acquired and preserved 45 acres (0.18 km^{2}) of the battlefield.
