= Curdsville =

Curdsville may refer to:

- Curdsville, Kentucky, an unincorporated community in Daviess County
- Curdsville, Virginia, an unincorporated community in Buckingham County
