= General Barlow =

General Barlow may refer to:

- Francis C. Barlow (1834–1896), Union Army brevet major general
- John W. Barlow (1838–1914), U.S. Army brigadier general

== See also ==
- Attorney General Barlow (disambiguation)
