= Attorney General Barlow =

Attorney General Barlow may refer to:

- Francis C. Barlow (1834–1896), Attorney General of New York
- Stephen Steele Barlow (1818–1900), Attorney General of Wisconsin

== See also ==
- General Barlow (disambiguation)
