= High Bridge Trail State Park =

Rail trail in Virginia, U.S.

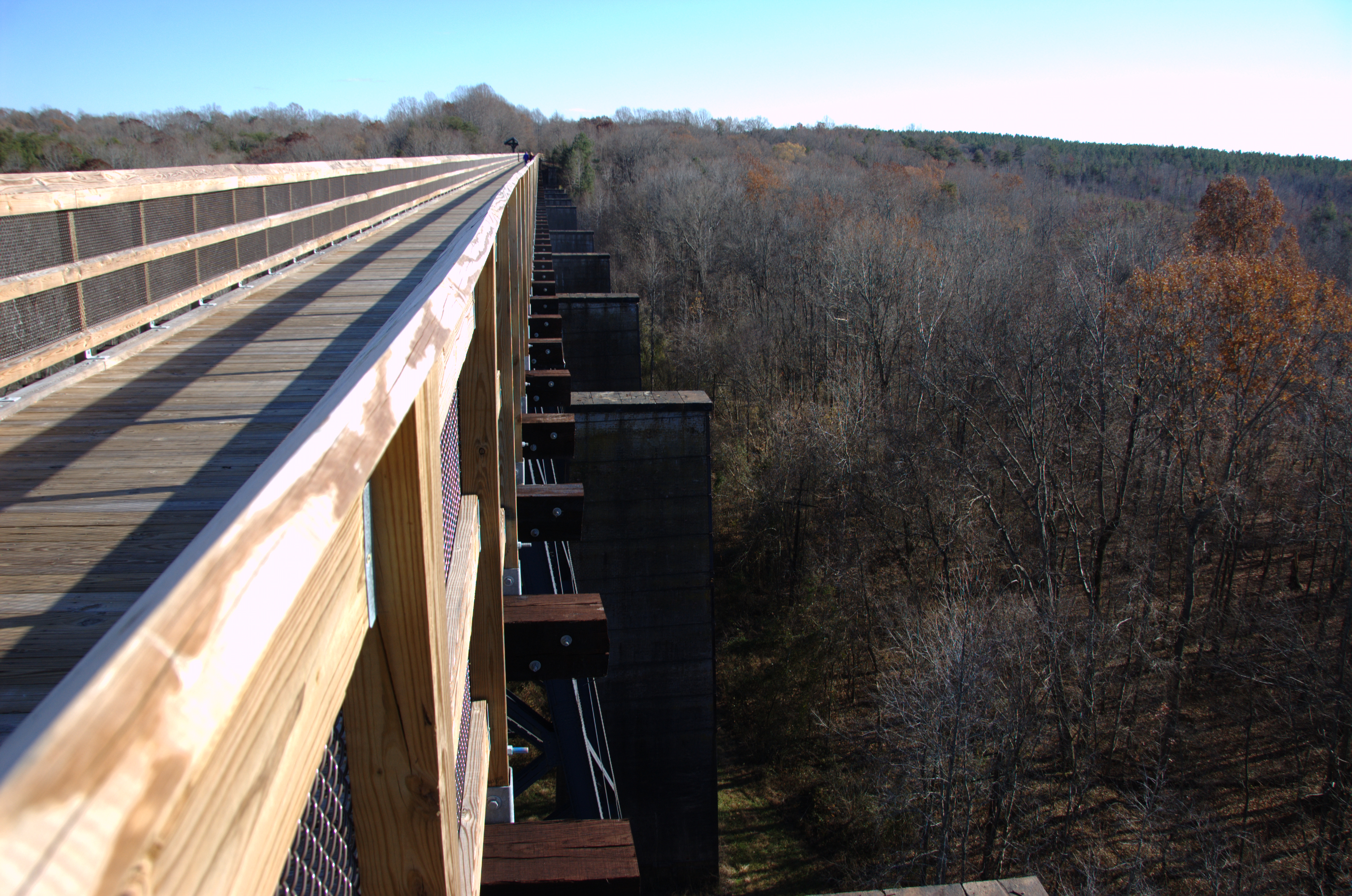
- High Bridge at High Bridge Trail State Park

- Location within Virginia
- Location: Central and Southside Virginia, United States
- Nearest city: Farmville, Virginia
- Coordinates: 37°18′40.61″N 78°19′5.99″W
- Area: 1,206 acres (488 ha)
- Established: 2006; Completed: 2012
- Governing body: Virginia Department of Conservation and Recreation

High Bridge Trail State Park is a rail trail in Southside Virginia converted from a rail line last belonging to Norfolk Southern.

The first section of the High Bridge Trail opened in 2008 with the most recent extension into The Town of Pamplin completed in Spring 2024. With a length of more than thirty miles, the trail is shared by bicyclists, pedestrians and equestrians — and includes a restored crossing at the Appomattox River over the historic High Bridge – from which the park derives its name.

The lineal park traverses Appomattox, Nottoway, Cumberland, and Prince Edward counties as well as Pamplin City, Prospect, Farmville, Rice and Burkeville. Where the trail traverses Farmville, it directly adjoins Longwood University at the campus' satellite housing and athletic site.

== Background ==
High Bridge was built by the Southside Railroad in 1854 to cross the Appomattox River and connect Petersburg with Lynchburg. The bridge is approximately 2,400 feet (730 m) long and ranges from 60 to 125 feet (18 to 38 m) high. It was originally made of wood trusses laid onto 20 brick piers. The upper level held a rail bridge and a pedestrian walkway, while the lower level was for wagons.

In the last days of the American Civil War, Confederate forces attempted to destroy the bridge after crossing it to prevent pursuing Union troops from being able to cross. After a long delay in receiving orders, Confederate engineers succeeded in setting the bridge on fire on the morning of April 7, 1865, just as Union troops approached. By the time Union men arrived, 3 of the bridge's 21 wooden spans had burned and a 4th span was on fire. Union engineers successfully cut the 4th span to prevent further destruction of the bridge. They then charged across the lower level, forcing Confederate forces to retreat and preventing the bridge from becoming impassable. This had a decisive result and may have advanced the end of the war by several days.

After the Battle of High Bridge and his surrender at Appomattox, Robert E. Lee told the very men who had destroyed the bridge – including civil engineer Major General William Mahone – to go home and start its rebuilding. Engineers began building temporary spans to replace those that had been destroyed; the South Side Rail Road company eventually finished the work and rail traffic resumed in September 1865.

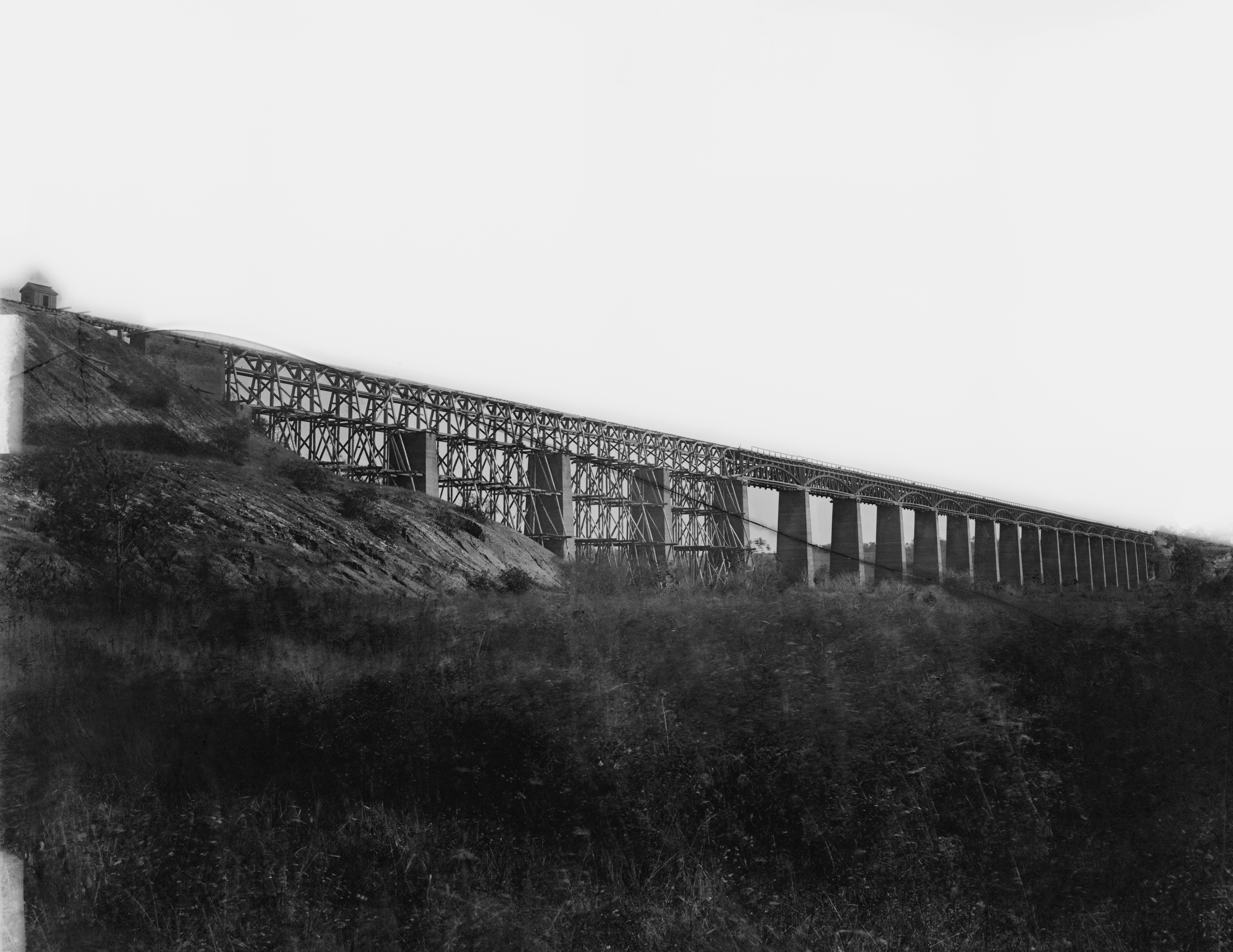
High bridge of the South Side Rail Road across the Appomattox, c. 1865

== Park history ==
Norfolk Southern's last train crossed High Bridge on October 26, 2004, and in December 2006 the company donated 31 miles (50 km) of abandoned rail to the Virginia Department of Conservation and Recreation, managers of the Virginia State Park system. Intended as a park with the High Bridge as its centerpiece, the shared-use path for non-motorized traffic – pedestrians, bicyclists, and horseback riders – would preserve and protect trail resources while creating an education resource for local and national history.

With a total budget of an estimated $11 million, four miles of trail east of Farmville opened on Aug. 22, 2008 and 12 more miles from Farmville west to Prospect opened on June 6, 2009. On April 6, 2012, after completion of the final segment of the trail, the restoration of the High Bridge itself, the trail opened for the first time for its full length — 147 years after the Battle of High Bridge.

== Park details ==
Having been privately owned and operated by Norfolk Southern and offering only very limited access, the park area now offers more than thirty miles of white limestone gravel trail open to the public. Retaining the 0.3% grade of the original rail line, the corridor features picnic, parking and toilet facilities as well as large oak trees, telegraph poles erected in the 1900s, remnants of the railroad's signal system, and Norfolk Southern's original cement mile markers. Park rangers and local police monitor the trail daily.

The trail receives community support from the Friends of High Bridge Trail State Park (FoHBTSP). Formed shortly after the creation of the trail, the volunteer group supports the trail with cleaning, publicity and citizen patrol efforts.

The High Bridge State Park has added a Mountain Bike Trail System. It is located on the Rochelle tract about 1.5 miles east of the Main Street Access in Farmville. There are two single track loops: the Earley trail, a 1.6 mile blue-blazed beginner loop; and the Burnside Technical Trail, a 2.6 mile red-blazed intermediate/difficult loop.

== See also ==
- Cycling infrastructure
- Rails-to-Trails Conservancy
- List of Virginia state parks
- Virginia Capital Trail
- New River Trail State Park
- Greenbrier River Trail
- Virginia Creeper Trail
- Fall Line Trail
- Washington & Old Dominion Trail
