= Daniel Pratt (New York politician) =

American judge

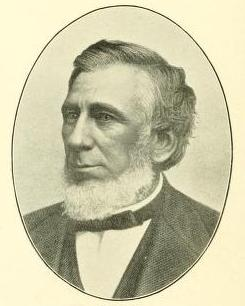
Daniel Pratt

Daniel Pratt (1806 Washington County, New York – July 23, 1884 Syracuse, Onondaga County, New York) was an American lawyer and politician.

== Life ==
He worked on his father's farm and from age 18 and taught district school. He then entered Cambridge Academy, and graduated from Union College in 1835. Afterwards he taught school again in Memphis, New York and studied law there with D. D. Hills. He was admitted to the bar in 1836 and opened a law office with Hills in Syracuse.

In 1843, he was appointed Judge of the Court of Common Pleas of Onondaga County, a post he held until he was legislated out of office in July 1847. He was a justice of the New York Supreme Court from 1847 to 1858, and ex officio a judge of the New York Court of Appeals in 1850 and 1858. Afterwards he resumed the practice of law in partnership with D. J. Mitchell and Wilber M. Brown in Syracuse.

As a Democrat he was New York State Attorney General from 1874 to 1875.

The Onondaga Historical Association Museum in Syracuse has a portrait of his son George Comstock Pratt (1842–1853). His widow Augusta J. Pratt was one of the heirs to the $100,000,000 worth Townley English estate in 1885.

== Sources ==
- His obit, in NYT on July 24, 1884

Legal offices
Preceded by Francis C. Barlow	New York State Attorney General; 1874–1875	Succeeded by Charles S. Fairchild
