= Paineville, Virginia =

Unincorporated community in Virginia, United States

- Unincorporated community
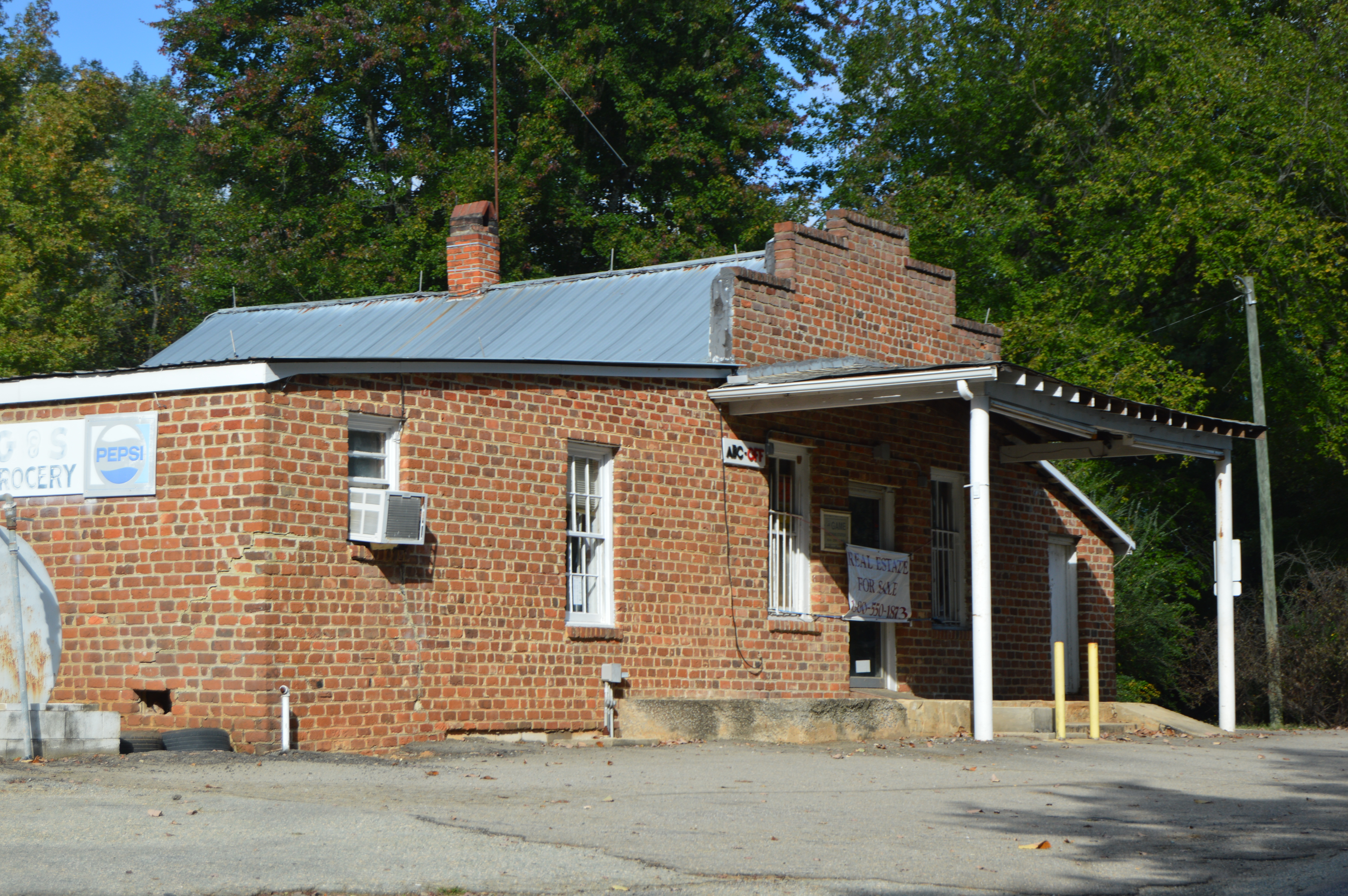
- Former country store in Paineville

- Location within the Commonwealth of Virginia Paineville, Virginia (the United States)
- Coordinates: 37°23′15″N 78°07′13″W
- Country: United States
- State: Virginia
- County: Amelia
- Elevation: 453 ft (138 m)
- Time zone: UTC−5 (Eastern (EST))
  - Summer (DST): UTC−4 (EDT)
- ZIP codes: 23002, 23083
- Area code: 804
- GNIS feature ID: 1477604

Paineville is a rural unincorporated community in western Amelia County in the U.S. state of Virginia. It is located in Leigh District around the intersections of SR 616 (S. Genito Road) with SR 644 (Fowlkes Bridge Road / Rocky Ford Road). Paineville straddles the border of ZIP codes 23002 (Amelia Court House) and 23083 (Jetersville). The community has its own fire station, Amelia County Volunteer Fire Department Company 5. A portion of the segment of U.S. Bicycle Route 1 that runs southwest from Richmond follows SR 616 through Paineville.

== History ==
Paineville was among the first towns in Amelia to get its own post office; as early as 1803, a "Painville" in Amelia County appeared on the official "List of Post-Offices in the United States" published by the Post Office Department. The town was commonly noted as "Painesville" in 19th-century sources. The branch there has since closed.

On April 5, 1865, during the final days of the Civil War, as General Robert E. Lee and his army continued their westward retreat, Union troops attacked and destroyed a Confederate wagon train near Paineville. The engagement was one of the few, if not the only one, to involve Black Confederate troops, and was among a number of skirmishes in the last week before the surrender to Ulysses S. Grant at Appomattox Court House on April 9, 1865.

In the 1960s, after desegregation, the property of historic Paineville School, on Route 616, was put up for auction along with several other small schoolhouses in Amelia County. Although all the properties advertised were of similar description and most were Rosenwald Schools, it is unclear whether Paineville School was itself a Rosenwald. During the early 20th century, the Rosenwald School project constructed thousands of facilities across the South primarily for the education of African American children. As of 2023 the original Paineville structure was still intact, serving as an outbuilding for an adjacent house, and the property was again listed for sale.
