= Reuben Lindsay Walker =

Confederate officer in the American Civil War

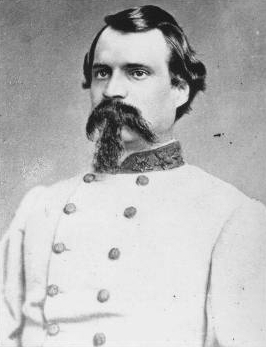
- General Reuben L. Walker
- Born: May 29, 1827; Logan Village, Albemarle County, Virginia
- Died: June 7, 1890 (age 63); Fluvanna County, Virginia
- Burial place: Hollywood Cemetery, Richmond
- Military career
- Allegiance: Confederate States of America
- Branch: Confederate States Army
- Service years: 1861–65 (CSA)
- Rank: Brigadier General (CSA)
- Nickname: Rube
- Commands: Chief of Artillery, III Corps, ANV
- Conflicts: American Civil War: First Battle of Bull Run; Second Battle of Bull Run; Battle of Antietam; Battle of Fredericksburg; Battle of Gettysburg; Overland Campaign; Siege of Petersburg; Appomattox Campaign
- Other work: engineer, railroader

Reuben Lindsay Walker (May 29, 1827 – June 7, 1890) was a Confederate general who served in the artillery during the American Civil War.

== Early life ==
Walker was born in Logan Village, Albemarle County, Virginia. He graduated from the Virginia Military Institute (VMI) in 1845. He then became a civil engineer, and later, a farmer in Virginia.

== Civil War ==
When the Civil War began, Walker took command of the Purcell Artillery unit. After seeing action at the First Battle of Bull Run (First Manassas), Walker became the chief of artillery to General A.P. Hill. Lindsay Walker, as he was known, amassed a lengthy combat record, serving in every one of the Army of Northern Virginia's major battles except the Seven Days Battles (he was ill at the time). He commanded artillery of Hill's Light Division during the Battle of Harpers Ferry and the Battle of Antietam in the Maryland Campaign. When Powell Hill was promoted to corps command, Walker became the head of the Third Corps artillery. He commanded the corps' reserve artillery in the Battle of Gettysburg, directly commanding the battalions of Majs. David G. McIntosh and William J. Pegram. He had direct command of all the corps' artillery battalions thereafter, including in the Overland Campaign and the Siege of Petersburg. In all, Walker served in 63 battles and engagements and was never once wounded, despite being a large target at 6'4" tall and despite often serving in very hot fighting. Walker was promoted to brigadier general on February 18, 1865.

== Postbellum career ==
After the war, Walker moved to Selma, Alabama, where he headed the Marine & Selma Railroad. He returned to Virginia in 1876 and became an engineer for the Richmond and Alleghany Railroad. As a civil engineer, Walker oversaw the construction of an addition to the Virginia State Penitentiary and the Texas State Capitol building.

== Death ==
Walker died in Fluvanna County, Virginia, and was buried in Richmond's famous Hollywood Cemetery.

== See also ==
- List of American Civil War generals (Confederate)
