= Curdsville, Virginia =

Unincorporated community in Virginia, United States

Coordinates: 37°24′57″N 78°27′21″W

Curdsville is an unincorporated community in Buckingham County, in the U.S. state of Virginia.

An 1855 gazetteer described it as "a small post-village" at the head of navigation on the Willis River with "a large flouring mill."
