= Francis C. Barlow =

American lawyer, politician, and Union general (1834–1896)

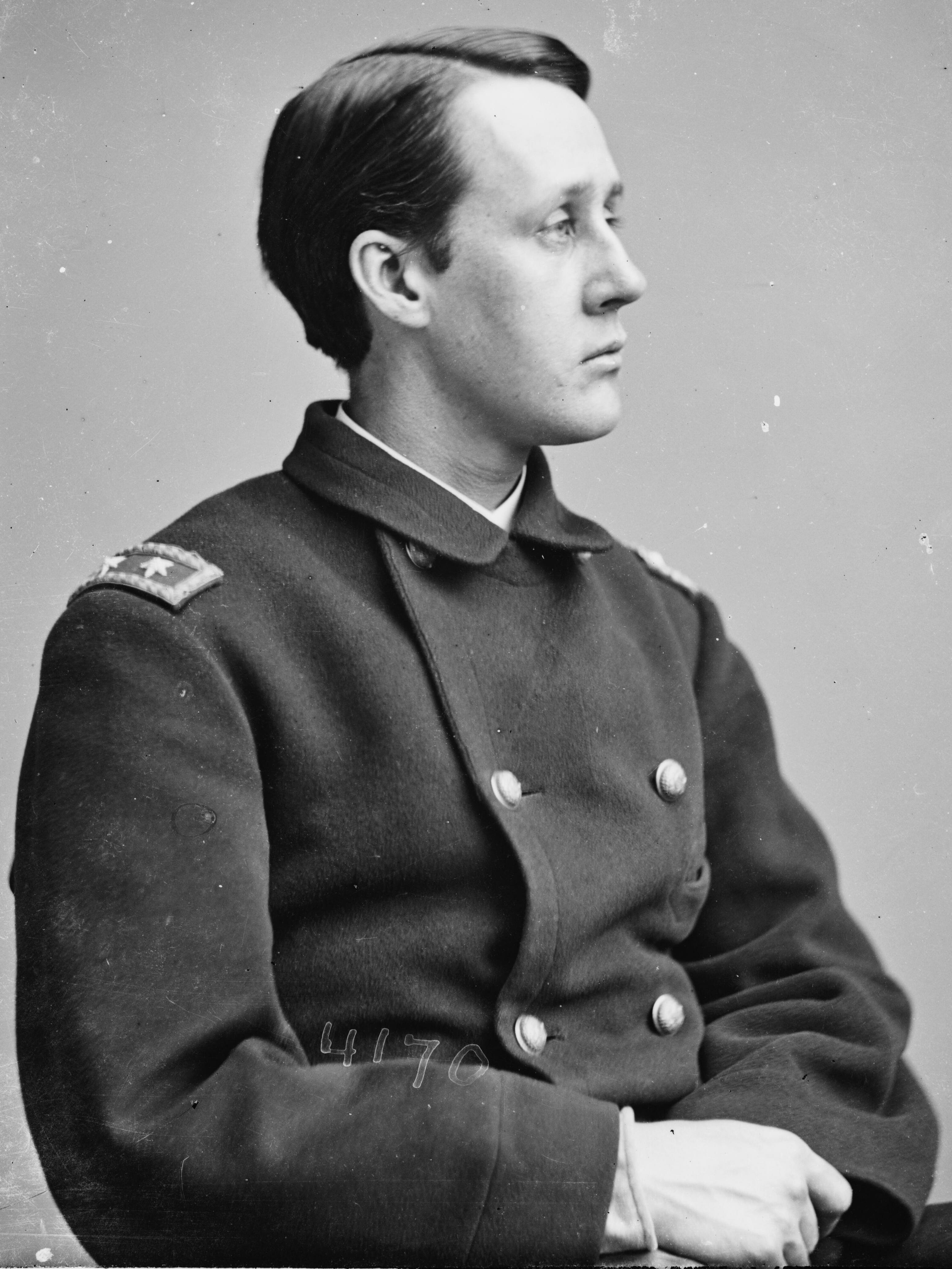
- Barlow, 1855–1865

33rd Attorney General of New York
- In office January 1, 1872 – December 31, 1873
- Governor: John T. Hoffman; John Adams Dix
- Preceded by: Marshall B. Champlain
- Succeeded by: Daniel Pratt

29th Secretary of State of New York
- In office January 1, 1866 – December 31, 1867
- Governor: Reuben Fenton
- Preceded by: Chauncey Depew
- Succeeded by: Homer A. Nelson

Personal details
- Born: Francis Channing Barlow; October 19, 1834 Brooklyn, New York, U.S.
- Died: January 11, 1896 (aged 61) New York City, New York, U.S.
- Resting place: Walnut Street Cemetery, Brookline, Massachusetts

Military service
- Allegiance: United States of America; Union
- Branch/service: United States Army; Union Army
- Years of service: 1861–1865
- Rank: Major General
- Commands: 2nd Corps; 61st New York Infantry Regiment
- Battles/wars: American Civil War; Peninsula Campaign; Battle of Seven Pines; Seven Days Battles; Battle of Antietam (WIA); Battle of Chancellorsville; Battle of Gettysburg (WIA); Overland Campaign; Battle of the Wilderness; Battle of Spotsylvania Court House; Battle of Cold Harbor; Siege of Petersburg; Appomattox Campaign

Francis Channing Barlow (October 19, 1834 – January 11, 1896) was a lawyer, politician, and Union General during the American Civil War.

== Early life and career ==
Barlow was born in Brooklyn, New York, the son of a Unitarian minister, but was raised in his mother's home town of Brookline, Massachusetts. He was educated on Brook Farm, with Ralph Waldo Emerson among his teachers. He studied law at Harvard University starting at the age of 17, graduated first in his class, and was practicing law on the staff of the New York Tribune newspaper when the Civil War broke out in 1861. His future wife, Arabella Wharton Griffith, was writing for the Tribune at the same time, which may have been how the two met.

== Civil War ==
In April 1861, Barlow enlisted as a private in the 12th Regiment, New York State Militia, leaving behind his new bride, Arabella Wharton Griffith Barlow, 10 years his senior, after one day of marriage. He was commissioned a first lieutenant in his first month of service. His regiment had only a three-month term of enlistment and he mustered out with his men, but soon found a new regiment. By November he was a lieutenant colonel in the 61st New York Volunteer Infantry Regiment, and by the time of the Peninsula Campaign in the spring of 1862, he became its colonel.

Barlow saw his first action at the Battle of Seven Pines as part of the brigade commanded by Brig. Gen. Oliver Otis Howard in the 2nd Corps of the Army of the Potomac. At Glendale, in the Seven Days Battles, his regiment became separated from the rest of the brigade; and he exercised personal initiative by advancing his men to the sound of the fighting, encountering a Confederate battle line and leading his men in a bayonet charge against it. The enemy fled, and Barlow picked up a fallen Confederate flag. At the Battle of Malvern Hill, Barlow and his men successfully defended the line against repeated Confederate assaults.

At the Battle of Antietam, commanding the 61st and 64th New York regiments in the First Brigade, First Division, Second Corps, Barlow's men were in the center of fighting at the infamous sunken road ("Bloody Lane") and captured about 300 prisoners. He was wounded by an artillery shell in the face and by canister in the groin. Brig. Gen. John C. Caldwell, Barlow's brigade commander, wrote about Barlow in his official report following the battle:

Whatever praise is due to the most distinguished bravery, the utmost coolness and quickness of perception, the greatest promptitude and skill in handling troops under fire, is justly due to him. It is but simple justice to say that he has proved himself fully equal to every emergency, and I have no doubt that he would discharge the duties of a much higher command with honor to himself and benefit to the country.

— John C. Caldwell, Official report from the Battle of Antietam

Two days after the battle, Barlow was promoted to brigadier general of volunteers. He was an unusual general, slight of build with a peaceful, boyish face, colorless cheeks without a typical general's beard, and a thin voice. He dressed informally, often wearing a "checked flannel lumberjack shirt" under an unbuttoned uniform coat. One of General George Meade's staff officers wrote that he looked "like a highly independent mounted newsboy." But Barlow had a reputation as an aggressive fighter with strong personal confidence. Rather than carrying the Army-issued officer sword, he wore a heavy enlisted man's cavalry saber, which he used to whack the backsides of stragglers. (His disdain for stragglers became a personal obsession. His columns on the march would be followed by a company in skirmish line with fixed bayonets to move them along.)

Barlow suffered from his Antietam wound for months, becoming emaciated and suffering from what doctors called an "influence of malaria." Although he was not fully recovered, he returned to the Army in April 1863 and commanded the 2nd Brigade, Second Division, 11th Corps, at the Battle of Chancellorsville. There, his corps was subjected to the devastating flank attack of Lt. Gen. Thomas J. "Stonewall" Jackson that routed it, but Barlow's brigade had been detached to support the 3rd Corps and thus escaped the humiliation. After the battle, General Howard promoted Barlow to command of the 1st Division, 11th Corps, replacing its wounded commander, with orders to restore the fighting qualities of its defeated brigades. Barlow immediately angered his men by arresting the popular Col. Leopold von Gilsa, and they considered him a "petty tyrant."

On July 1, 1863, Barlow commanded his unhappy division at the Battle of Gettysburg. While awaiting the expected Confederate assault, Barlow left his assigned position to move to higher ground on Blocher's Knoll (now known as Barlow's Knoll). His move left the remaining 11th Corps division, that of Maj. Gen. Carl Schurz, at risk, and exposed both of his own flanks. The Confederates took advantage of his error: Maj. Gen. Jubal Early's division overwhelmed Barlow's division and forced the retreat of the entire Eleventh Corps with great loss. Barlow himself was wounded and left for dead on the field. He was found and cared for by Confederate Brig. Gen. John B. Gordon, who sent him to a field hospital. According to an account written by Gordon in 1901, he allowed Barlow's wife Arabella to enter the Confederate camp to tend to her wounded husband, but this account is deemed apocryphal. The popular story continued that Gordon presumed Barlow had died and that both men met years later, being very surprised each was still alive. An examination of Barlow's subsequent war record makes this story very unlikely.

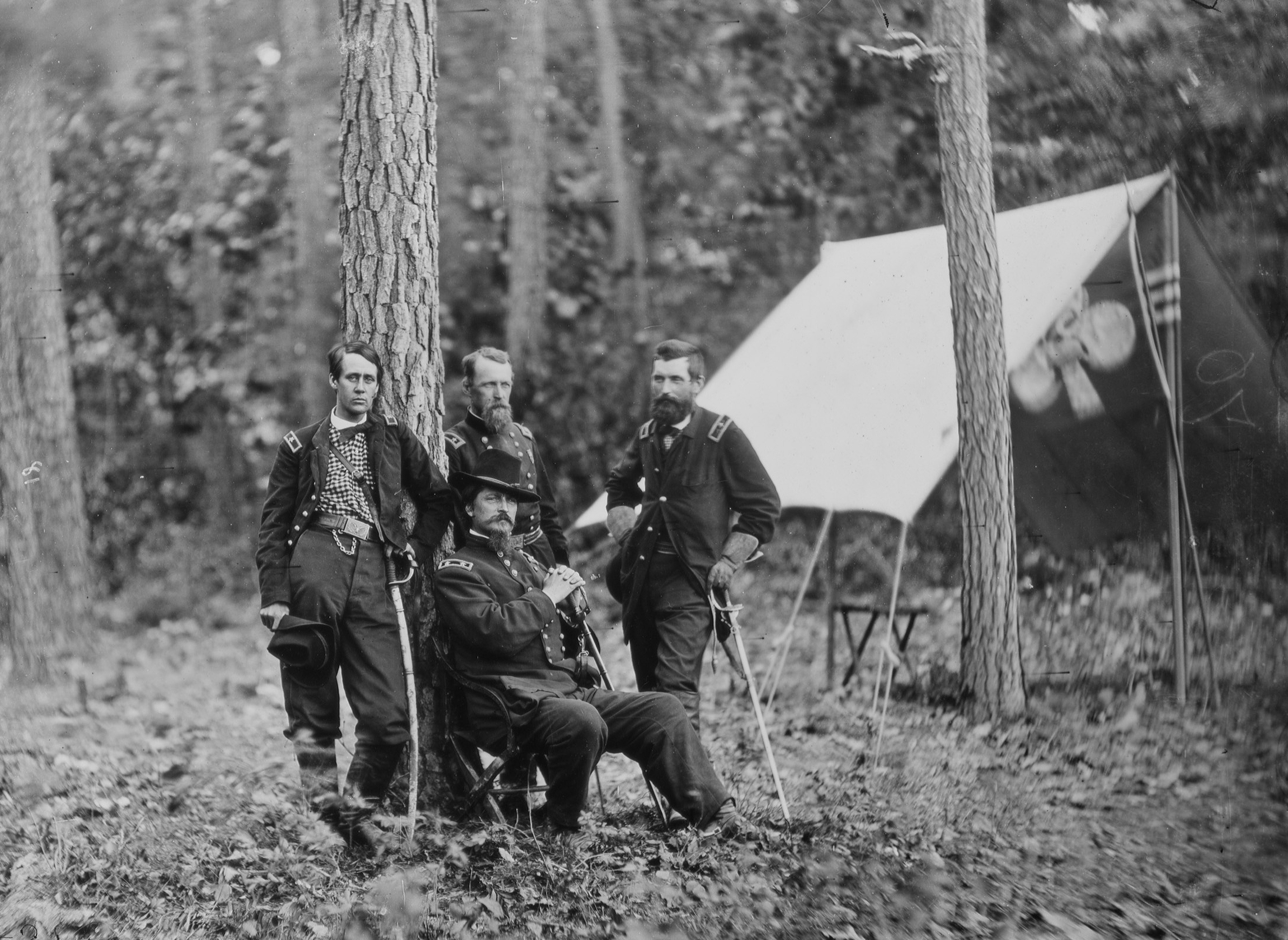
Maj. Gen. Winfield Scott Hancock and generals during the Overland Campaign. Standing, from left to right, are Barlow (wearing his familiar checked shirt), David B. Birney, and John Gibbon.

As the Confederates retreated from Gettysburg on July 4, Barlow was left behind and recovered by Federal forces. He was hospitalized for a lengthy period and could not return to the Army until April 1864, just in time for Lt. Gen. Ulysses S. Grant's Overland Campaign.

Barlow commanded the 1st Division of Maj. Gen. Winfield Scott Hancock's 2nd Corps, at the Battle of the Wilderness. At Spotsylvania Court House, Barlow's division was chosen to lead the Second Corps' assault of the Confederate entrenchments against a salient in the Confederate line later known as the "Mule Shoe" on May 12, 1864. This assault resulted in the Second Corps capturing thousands of Confederate prisoners. Hand-to-hand fighting ensued for over 21 hours, the longest hand-to-hand combat in the entire war. Later at the Battle of Cold Harbor, Barlow's division participated in large assault on June 3, 1864, which included elements from the Army of the Potomac and Army of the James. Barlow's division was the only US unit to penetrate the Confederate line and briefly captured Confederate works on a slight rise. In particular, the 7th New York Heavy Artillery from Barlow's division held the works until finally pushed out by Confederate reinforcements.

Barlow's division next participated in the opening assaults against Petersburg, including the evening assault on June 16 against Confederate Battery Number 14 near the Shand House. Barlow's division was successful at capturing the small fort, but was counterattacked by Confederate reinforcements and losses were heavy in his division, and included the death of Colonel Patrick Kelly, commander of the Irish Brigade. On June 22, Barlow's division suffered its worst defeat. The Army of the Potomac was in the process of extending its position south of Petersburg along the Jerusalem Plank Road when it was attacked in its flank and rear by Confederate forces under William Mahone. Barlow's division was attacked first, then the two other divisions in the Second Corps were flanked and rolled up. The stand of a few regiments in Major General John Gibbon's Second Division along the Jerusalem Plank Road finally brought the Confederate assault to an end. The Second Corps lost over 2,000 men captured and nearly 700 killed and wounded.

Barlow's wife Arabella had been working as a nurse in US hospitals in Fredericksburg and White House Landing, and had accompanied the army at times to be closer to her husband. On one occasion, Arabella visited Barlow at Cold Harbor on June 7. By early July, Arabella was ill and died on July 27, 1864 in a hospital in Washington. Barlow was granted a 15-day leave on July 30 and accompanied Arabella's remains to New Jersey where she was buried in Somerville. Barlow returned to his division on August 13.

Starting on August 13, the Second Corps participated in the operations north of the James River known as the Second Battle of Deep Bottom. Hancock commanded the expedition, which included the 10th Corps from the Army of the James, as well as a cavalry division. Hancock thought the operation would be an opportunity for Barlow to show his ability to command a corps-size element and gave Barlow command of two divisions in the 2nd Corps. On August 14, Hancock ordered Barlow attack Confederate positions south of Fussell's Mill with two divisions of the Second Corps, but the attack was uncoordinated and ineffective. Not all the brigades advanced and the brigades that did advance did not attack with all the regiments at the same time. The Second Corps did not conduct any additional attacks during the battle. Barlow was no doubt suffering from fatigue and other physical ailments from the constant campaigning, as well as the emotional strain of losing his wife just weeks earlier. He relinquished command of the First Division on August 18 to Brigadier General Nelson Miles and went on extended leave.

On December 12, 1864, President Abraham Lincoln nominated Barlow for the award of the brevet grade of major general, to rank from August 1, 1864, for his leadership at the Battle of Spotsylvania, and the U.S. Senate confirmed the award on February 14, 1865. He fought at the Battle of Cold Harbor and the Siege of Petersburg in the same command.

Barlow returned to the Army of the Potomac in early April 1865 during the final campaign of the war in Virginia. Initially, Barlow was without a command and waited for an opportunity. On April 6, 1865, Barlow was appointed to lead the Second Division, Second Corps after Gen. William Hays and his staff were found asleep and not ready for the day's march. Hays was removed by the corps commander and placed in command of the Artillery Reserve. Barlow joined the Appomattox Campaign and engaged immediately in the Battle of Sailor's Creek. Even though Barlow outranked Miles, who was commanding Barlow's old First division and could have replaced him, Barlow gladly accepted command of the Second Division and allowed his friend to continue as commander of the First Division.

The next day, Barlow played a decisive role in the Battle of High Bridge near Farmville, Virginia. Barlow was pursuing Confederate troops who had crossed High Bridge the previous day. The Confederate troops included men led by Gen. Gordon, who at the time believed that he had killed Barlow at the Battle of Gettysburg. The Battle of High Bridge included two skirmishes, the first of which took place in the evening of April 6, prior to Barlow's arrival. Confederate forces captured roughly 800 men and wounded or killed others. They then planned to destroy the bridge afterward in order to prevent its use by Union forces. However, a delay in sending an order to destroy the bridge proved to be advantageous for Barlow's men, who arrived in the early morning of April 7 to find the lower level of the bridge in flames and collapsing. Barlow commanded some of his men to charge the bridge and put out the fire, and the second skirmish of the battle ensued. Union forces successfully crossed the upper level of the bridge and fought with the Confederates. The Confederate forces eventually retreated towards Appomattox Station, away from Farmville, where they hoped to find food and supplies. These actions by Barlow and his men potentially shortened the war by several days and put additional pressure on Gen. Robert E. Lee to surrender.

Barlow was appointed major general of volunteers on May 26, 1865, to rank from May 25, 1865, but the promotion was not confirmed by the U.S. Senate until February 23, 1866, after the war was over and Barlow had resigned from the army.

Barlow was one of only a few men who entered the Civil War as an enlisted man and ended the war as a full major general.

== Postbellum life ==
Arabella Barlow served as an army nurse in the Peninsula, Antietam, and Gettysburg campaigns. Twice she cared for her wounded husband. She died of typhus on July 27, 1864, while Francis was battling in the Overland Campaign. George Templeton Strong described her as "certainly the most brilliant, cultivated, easy graceful, effective talker of womankind, and [she] has read, thought and observed much and well."

After the war, he married Ellen Shaw, sister of Col. Robert Gould Shaw. The pair had three children.

Leaving the army on November 16, 1865, Barlow served as a United States Marshal and the New York Secretary of State and New York State Attorney General, prosecuting the Boss Tweed ring, before he returned to his law practice. As U.S. Marshal for the Southern District of New York, during May–July 1869 Barlow prosecuted Cuban independence rebels for violating the Neutrality Act and disbanded the filibuster expeditions on the Perit, Quaker City, and Whiting steamers. He was a founder of the American Bar Association. He was active in Republican politics and investigated the 1876 presidential election, the Hayes-Tilden election, for irregularities.

During the nation's centennial in 1876, Barlow was Chief Marshal of celebrations in Concord, Massachusetts. This role was not merely symbolic, but administrative. He was responsible for invitations, organizing various local civic and military groups, and inviting such important figures as Ulysses S Grant.

Barlow died of Bright's disease in New York City on January 11, 1896. He was buried in Walnut Street Cemetery in Brookline, Massachusetts.

== In memoriam ==
Barlow is featured in Winslow Homer's painting Prisoners from the Front, depicting a scene from a June 21, 1864, engagement at Petersburg, Virginia.

== See also ==
- List of American Civil War generals (Union)
- New York state election, 1865

== Notes ==
Military offices
Preceded by Andrew A. Humphreys	Commander of the II Corps; April 22, 1865 – May 5, 1865	Succeeded by Andrew A. Humphreys
Political offices
Preceded by Chauncey Depew	New York Secretary of State; 1866–1867	Succeeded by Homer Augustus Nelson
Legal offices
Preceded by Marshall B. Champlain	New York State Attorney General; 1872–1873	Succeeded by Daniel Pratt
