= Appomattox Station =

Historic site in Virginia, US

- Appomattox Depot
- U.S. Historic district – Contributing property
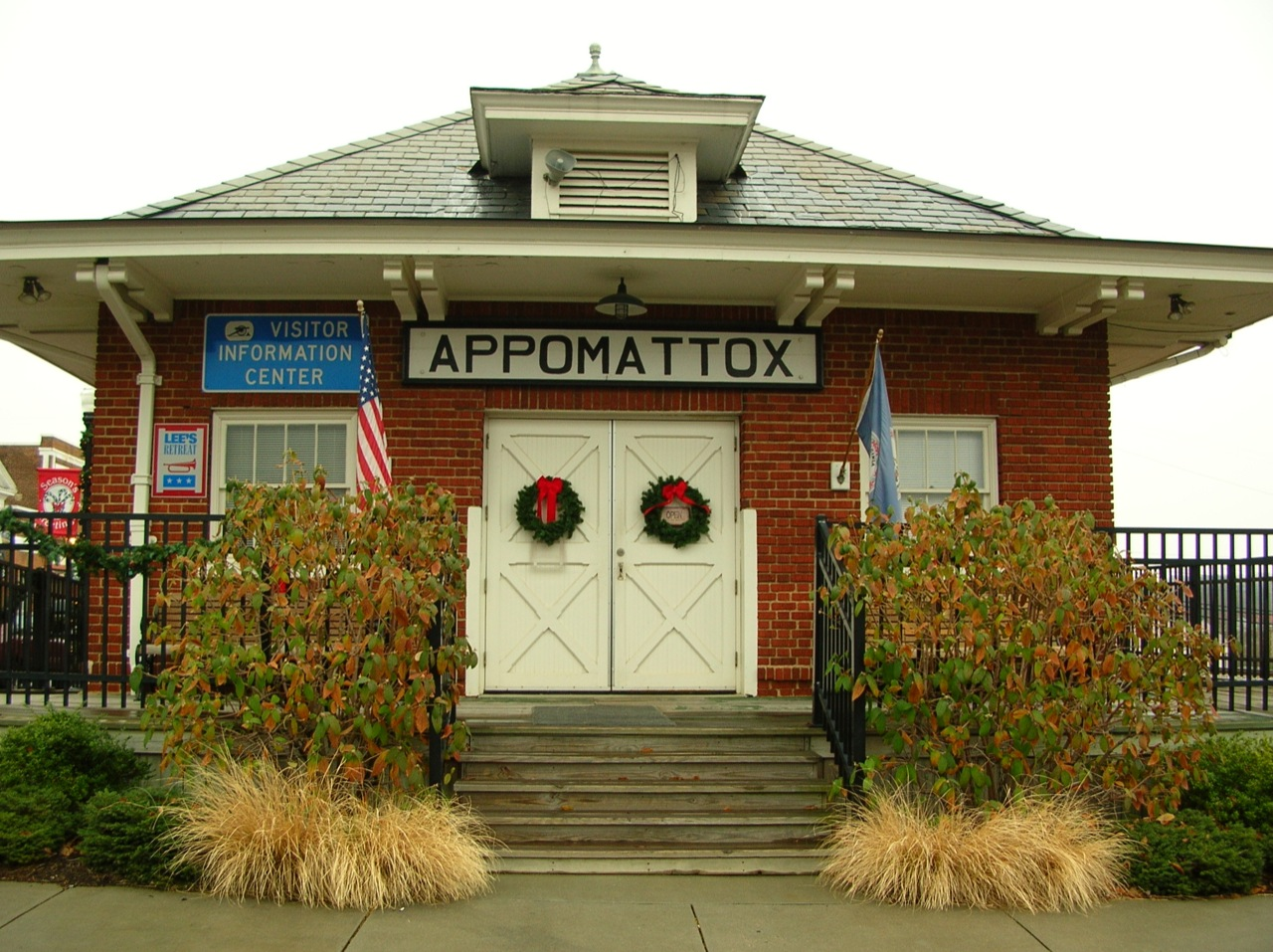
- The former Appomattox Norfolk and Western Station in December 2007

- Location within Virginia Location within the United States
- Location: Church Street & Main Street, Appomattox, Virginia
- Coordinates: 37°21′12.17″N 78°49′37.91″W
- Built: 1923
- Architect: Norfolk and Western Railway
- Part of: Appomattox Historic District (ID02000510)
- Designated CP: May 16, 2002

Appomattox Station was located in the town of Appomattox, Virginia (at the time, known as West Appomattox) and was the site of the Battle of Appomattox Station on the day before General Robert E. Lee surrendered the Army of Northern Virginia to Lieutenant General Ulysses S. Grant, effectively ending the Civil War. That station was destroyed by fire in 1898 and its replacement by fire in 1923. The current railway station, built within a block of the original location, is the Appomattox Depot (1923), a contributing property to the Appomattox Historic District. The depot is now home to the Appomattox Visitor Information Center.

There is a marker at Appomattox Depot that explains the final blow to General Robert E. Lee at the Battle of Appomattox Station, 1865:

You are standing near the site of Appomattox Station Depot on the South Side Railroad. Here, on the afternoon of April 8, 1865, Union cavalrymen under Gen. George A. Custer dealt the Army of Northern Virginia a final blow. First, they captured trains loaded with supplies for Confederates, then they attacked and captured Gen. R. Lindsay Walker’s wagons and artillery in bivouac half a mile to the north.

When word of this disaster reached Gen. Robert E. Lee at his headquarters a few miles northeast, he knew the end was near. He and Gen. Ulysses S. Grant had exchanged letters on the subject of surrender, and Lee had suggested a meeting between the lines the next day. With Union horsemen now blocking his escape route, Lee’s only hope lay in punching through them with a combined force of infantry and cavalry, and he scheduled a breakout attack for dawn. If it failed, or if he found Federal infantry in front of him as well, then he would have no choice but to surrender.

—

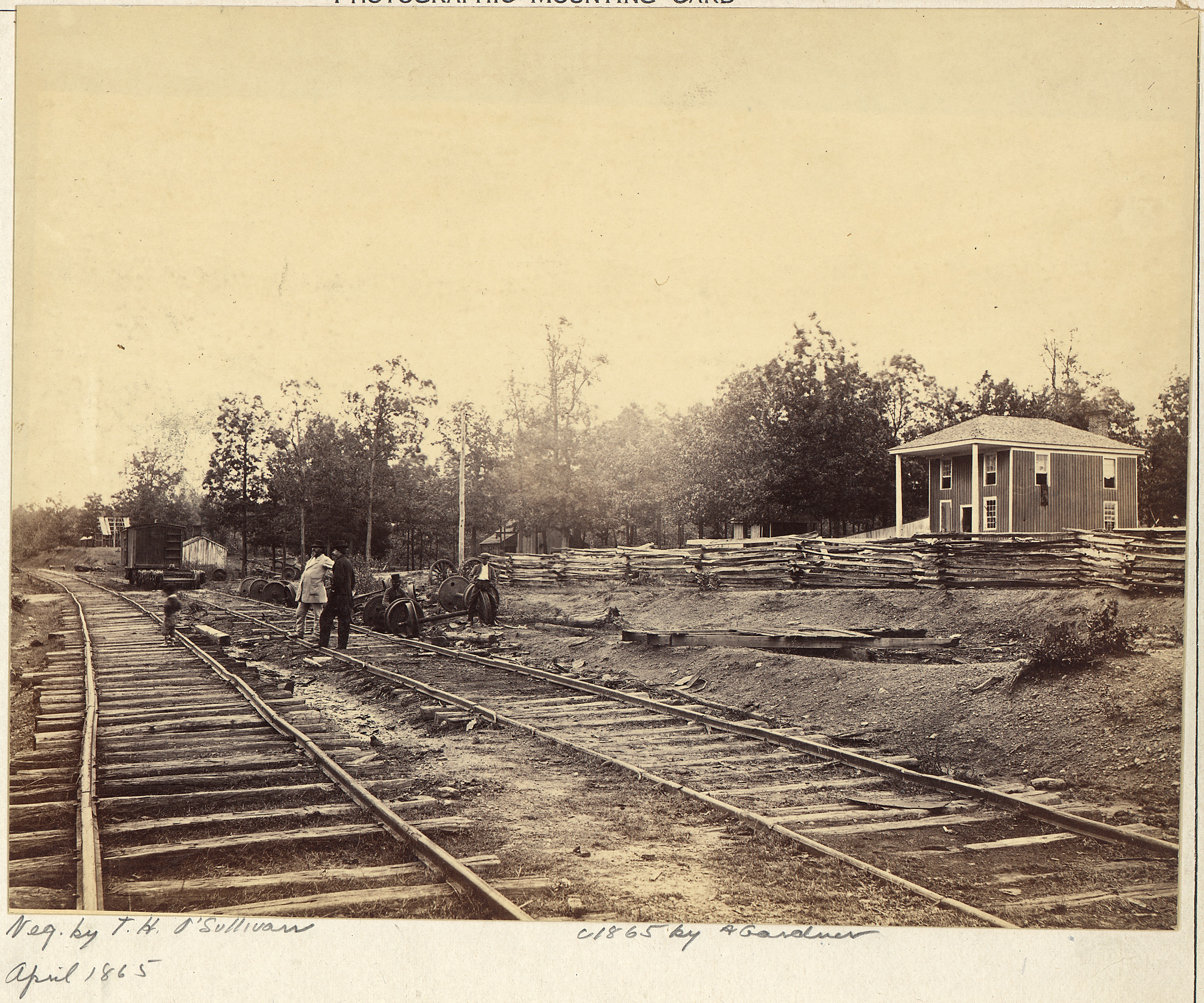
Original station, April 1865

Preceding station	Norfolk and Western Railway	Following station
Phoebe toward Cincinnati	Main Line	Pamplin toward Norfolk
