= Prospect, Virginia =

Unincorporated community in Virginia, United States

Prospect
- Unincorporated community
- Location within the Commonwealth of Virginia Prospect (the United States)
- Coordinates: 37°18′11″N 78°33′33″W
- Country: United States
- State: Virginia
- County: Prince Edward
- Time zone: UTC−5 (Eastern (EST))
  - Summer (DST): UTC−4 (EDT)

Prospect is an unincorporated community in Prince Edward County, Virginia, United States. This town was a stop on the Southside Railroad in the mid-nineteenth Century. This became the Atlantic, Mississippi and Ohio Railroad in 1870 and then a line in the Norfolk and Western Railway and now the Norfolk Southern Railway. The rail line from Burkville to Pamplin City, the stop after Prospect, was converted by Virginia Department of Parks and Recreation into High Bridge Trail State Park.
