= High Bridge (Appomattox River) =

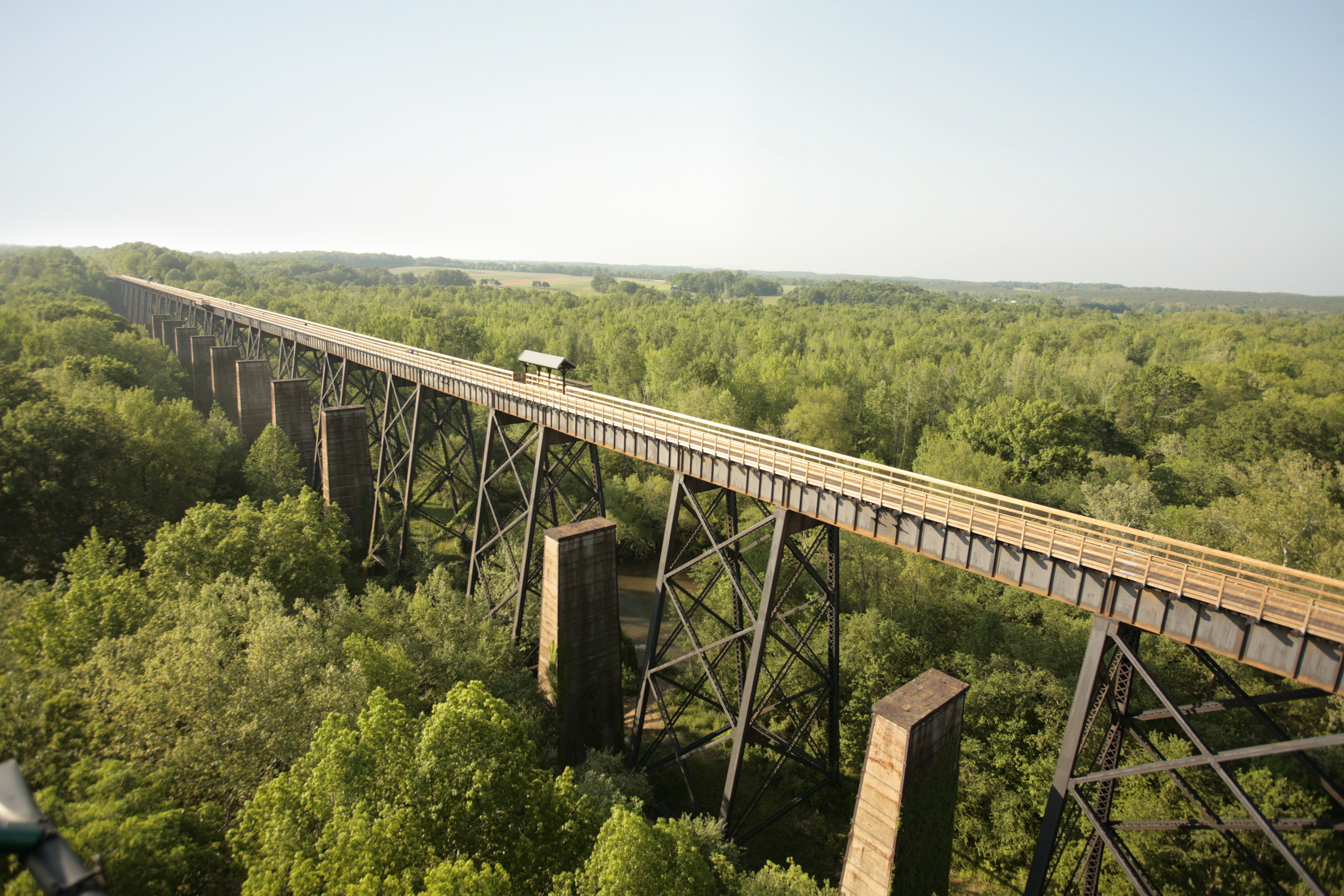
- Aerial view of High Bridge, after its 2012 renovation. The original masonry piers are visible beneath the bridge.
- Coordinates: 37°18′41″N 78°19′06″W
- Carries: Pedestrians (2012-Present); Rail (1854-2005)
- Crosses: Appomattox River valley
- Locale: Prince Edward and Cumberland Counties, Virginia

Characteristics
- Total length: 2,418 feet (737 m)
- Height: 125 feet (38 m)

History
- Opened: 1854
- Rebuilt: 1914
- High Bridge
- U.S. National Register of Historic Places
- Virginia Landmarks Register
- Location within Virginia Location within the United States
- Nearest city: Farmville, Virginia
- Coordinates: 37°18′41″N 78°19′6″W
- Built: 1854; 1914
- Built by: Virginia Bridge & Iron Co. (1914)
- NRHP reference No.: 08000875
- VLR No.: 024-0056

Significant dates
- Added to NRHP: September 12, 2008
- Designated VLR: June 19, 2008

Location
- Interactive map of High Bridge

High Bridge is a historic former railroad bridge across the Appomattox River valley about 6 miles (9.7 km) east, or downstream, of the town of Farmville in Prince Edward County, Virginia. The remains of the bridge and its adjacent rail line are now a rail trail park, High Bridge Trail State Park.

Originally constructed in the 1850s, the bridge was integral to the Southside Railroad between Petersburg and Lynchburg. As the site of the Battle of High Bridge in April 1865, the bridge played a pivotal role in Lee's retreat in the final days of the American Civil War – and ultimately the war's outcome. Rebuilt after the Civil War to its former dimensions, the 21-span structure was 2,400 feet (730 m) long at a maximum height of 125 feet (38 m) above the Appomattox River Valley. The bridge was completely rebuilt in 1914, leaving many of the original masonry piers adjacent to the new structure.

By 2005 its then-owner, Norfolk Southern, abandoned the corridor, subsequently giving 33 miles of the line to the Virginia Department of Conservation and Recreation (DCR). High Bridge opened to the public on April 6, 2012, the 147th anniversary of the Battle of High Bridge. The bridge is part of the completed trail, open to hiking, biking and horse back riding for 16 miles on either side of the bridge.

== History ==
=== Design and construction ===
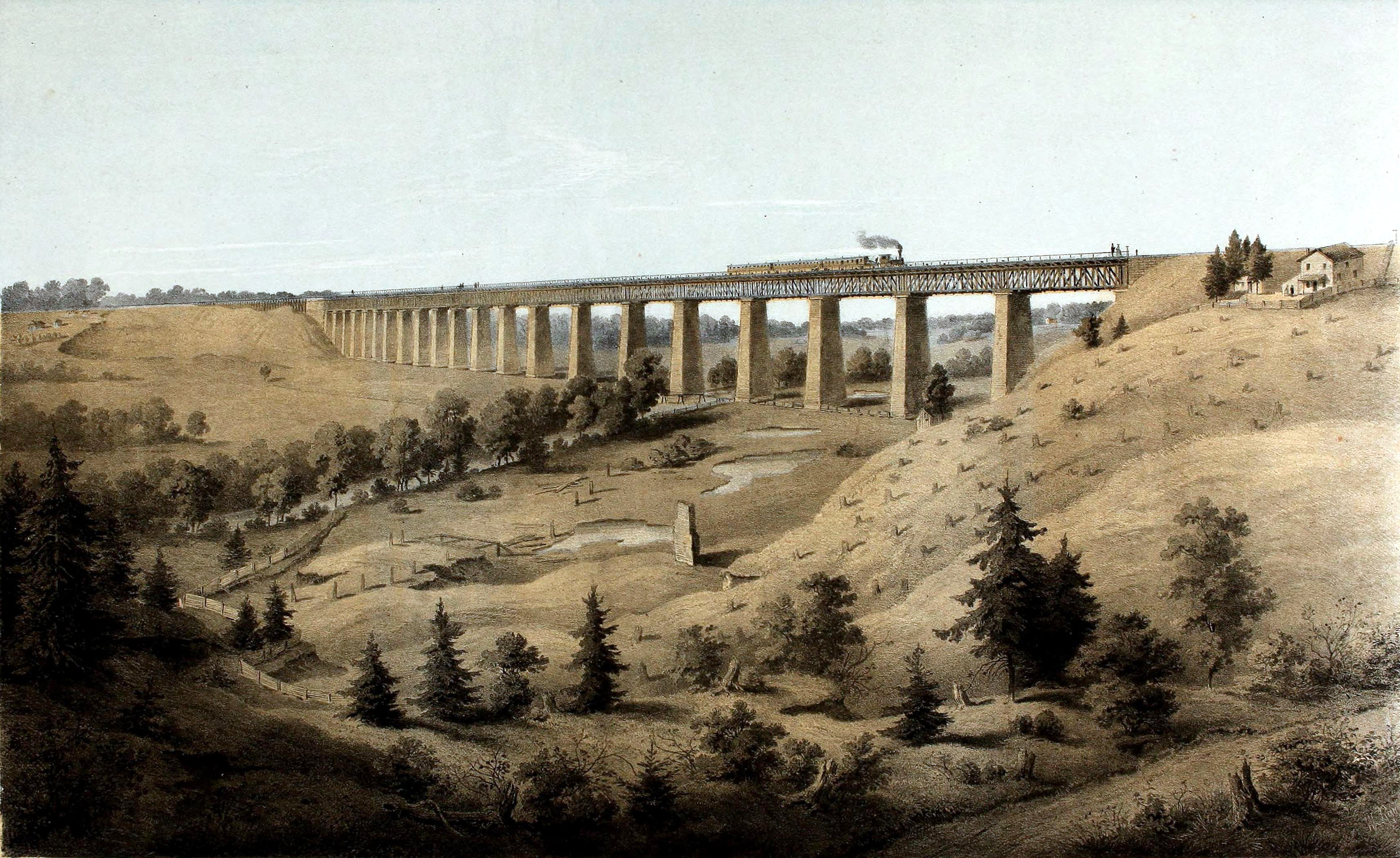
High Bridge in the 1850s

In the 1850s, the Southside Railroad built a rail line between Petersburg and Lynchburg, passing through Farmville between Burkeville and Pamplin City. The route, subsidized by a contribution from Farmville, required an expensive crossing of the Appomattox River valley, at a site near property known as Overton farm.

The site was surveyed and the bridge engineered by C.O. Sanford, who later reported to the stockholders of the Southside Railroad: "there have been higher bridges not so long, and longer bridges not so high, but taking the length and height together, this is, perhaps the largest bridge in the world."

The High Bridge's twenty piers contained almost four million bricks, and supported a wooden superstructure with a pedestrian walkway beside the rail line – along with an adjacent wagon bridge (known also as the lower wagon bridge) — which would ultimately play a pivotal role in the outcome of the Civil War. The bridge itself was completed in 1852 and the full line was completed in 1854.

=== American Civil War ===
The Southside Railroad was heavily damaged during the American Civil War. The High Bridge played a key role during Confederate General Robert E. Lee's final retreat from Petersburg in the last days of the War. The Battle of High Bridge took place there on April 6–7, 1865. Fleeing the Union troops, the Confederates set the bridge afire after crossing it, but failed to destroy it. Union troops were able to use it and continued the chase, which ended several days later at Appomattox Courthouse, where Lee's surrender to Union General Ulysses S. Grant took place on April 9, 1865.

=== Post-bellum, AM&O, N&W ===
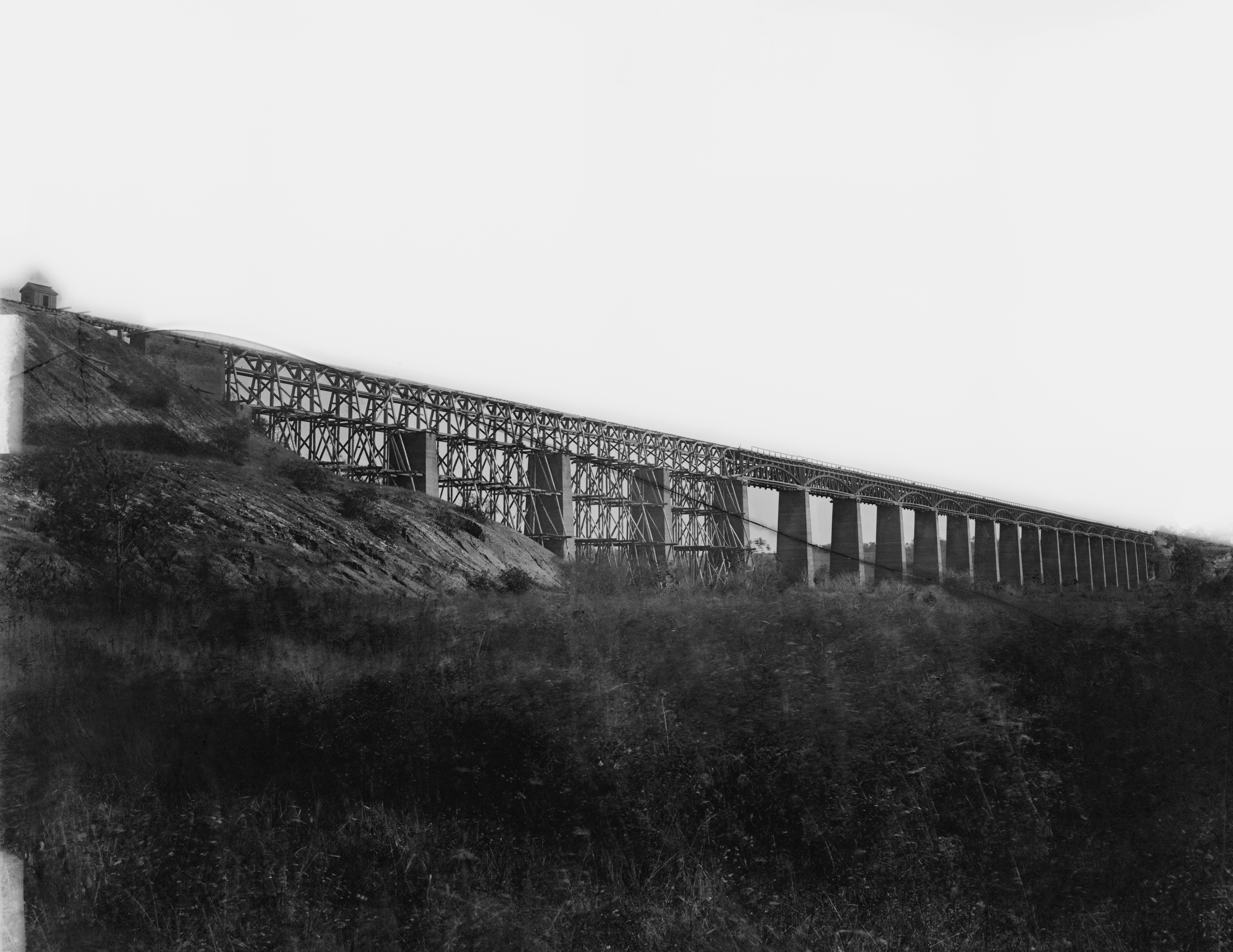
High Bridge over the Appomattox River near Farmville, Virginia. Photographed in 1865 by Timothy H. O'Sullivan during repairs following its burning during the war.

After the Civil War, Robert E. Lee directed the Confederate engineers who had attempted to destroy the bridge to rebuild it. Under the leadership of former Confederate General William "Billy" Mahone, the bridge was rebuilt, including 21 new Fink deck truss spans on the High Bridge erected in 1869.

In 1870, the Southside Railroad was combined with the Norfolk and Petersburg Railroad and the Virginia and Tennessee Railroad to form Mahone's Atlantic, Mississippi and Ohio Railroad (AM&O), which stretched 400 miles across the southern tier of Virginia from Norfolk on Hampton Roads to Bristol. After the Financial Panic of 1873, the AM&O fell into default on its debt, and was purchased in the early 1880s by new owners who renamed it the Norfolk and Western (N&W). N&W replaced the High Bridge's Fink truss spans in 1886 with minimal interruption of rail traffic, one span at a time, first suspending a new Pratt deck truss from traveling wooden falsework and then removing the old truss.

The bridge was completely rebuilt in 1914. In 1982, N&W became part of the current Norfolk Southern Railway system.

=== Tragedy on the bridge ===
A tragedy occurred on August 9, 1989, when nine young people strolling on the bridge were surprised by the sudden appearance of a train traveling west at 40 miles per hour. Five of them were able to run to safety on the east end of the bridge. Three more who were farther out on the bridge ran for a platform on the side of the bridge; but one of them, a man, was killed by impact with the train. The ninth person, a woman, fell from the trestle to rocks below and was critically injured. In the aftermath, the Norfolk Southern Railroad agreed to install fences and more effective “posted” signs, and to require train crews to blow whistles when approaching High Bridge and a number of other trestles. In 1999 a lawsuit was settled between the railroad and the parents of the man who was fatally struck by the train.

=== High Bridge Trail State Park ===
Partially due to the high cost of maintaining the High Bridge over the Appomattox River valley, Norfolk Southern downgraded and eventually abandoned the line through Farmville in favor of the "Low-grade Line" between Burkeville and Pamplin. The low-grade line, completed in 1916, contained more favorable grades for westbound trains. The Southside Railroad had originally envisioned using the low-grade route until persuaded by the citizens of Farmville, Virginia to bring the line through their town.

Following 2006 discussions to turn the High Bridge into a portion of a rail trail or part of a linear state park, the rail land and bridge have since been donated to the Commonwealth of Virginia and have become the High Bridge Trail State Park. The renovated bridge opened April 6, 2012.

== See also ==
- List of bridges on the National Register of Historic Places in Virginia
- List of road-rail bridges
