= Lynchburg metropolitan area =

Lynchburg Metropolitan Area Region 2000
- Metropolitan Statistical Area
- Lynchburg, VA Metropolitan Statistical Area
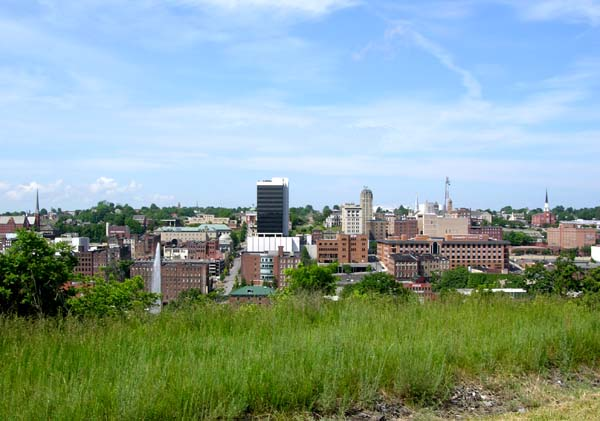
- Downtown Lynchburg skyline
Interactive Map of Roanoke Metropolitan Area
Lynchburg, VA MSA
City of Lynchburg
- Country: United States
- State: Virginia
- Largest city: Lynchburg

Area
  - Total: 2,139.2 sq mi (5,541 km^{2})
  - Land: 2,113.1 sq mi (5,473 km^{2})
  - Water: 26.1 sq mi (68 km^{2}) 1.2%

Population (2016 Estimates)
  - Total: 260,232 (US: 184th)

GDP
  - MSA: $12.464 billion (2022)
- Time zone: UTC−5 (EST)
  - Summer (DST): UTC−4 (EDT)
- ZIP codes: 24095, 24104, 24121, 24122, 24174, 24178, 24501, 24502, 24503, 24504, 24505, 24506, 24512, 24513, 24514, 24515, 14517, 24521, 24522, 24523, 24526, 24528, 24533, 24536, 24538, 24550, 24551, 24554, 24556, 24570, 24571, 24572, 24574, 24576, 24588, 24593, 24595
- Area code: 434/540

The Lynchburg, VA Metropolitan Statistical Area is a metropolitan statistical area (MSA) in the U.S. state of Virginia, defined by the Office of Management and Budget (OMB) as of July 2023. As of the 2020 census, the MSA had a population of 261,593. In 2025 this was estimated to have risen to 269,169, making it the fifth-largest metro area in the state and the 188th largest in the United States.

== MSA components ==
Note: Since a state constitutional change in 1871, places in Virginia incorporated as a "city" are independent cities and are not located in any county. The OMB considers these independent cities to be county-equivalents for the purpose of defining MSAs in Virginia.

Four counties and one independent city are included in the Lynchburg Metropolitan Statistical Area.

- Counties
  - Amherst
  - Appomattox
  - Bedford
  - Campbell
- Independent Cities
  - Lynchburg

== Communities ==
=== Places with more than 75,000 inhabitants ===
- Lynchburg (Principal city)

=== Places with 10,000 to 15,000 inhabitants ===
- Forest (census-designated place)
- Madison Heights (census-designated place)
- Timberlake (census-designated place)

=== Places with 1,000 to 10,000 inhabitants ===
- Altavista
- Amherst
- Appomattox
- Bedford
- Brookneal
- Rustburg (census-designated place)

=== Places with less than 1,000 inhabitants ===
- Pamplin City (partial)

=== Unincorporated places ===
- Beckham
- Bent Creek
- Big Island
- Bowler
- Chamblissburg
- Chap
- Concord
- Evergreen
- Fore Store
- Goode
- Hardy
- Hixburg
- Huddleston
- Lynch Station
- Moneta
- Montvale
- New London
- Spout Spring
- Spring Mills
- Stewartsville
- Stonewall
- Sweet Briar
- Thaxton
- Vera

== Demographics ==
As of the census of 2000, there were 228,616 people, 89,736 households, and 62,698 families residing within the MSA. The racial makeup of the MSA was 79.42% White, 18.16% African American, 0.30% Native American, 0.69% Asian, 0.02% Pacific Islander, 0.39% from other races, and 1.01% from two or more races. Hispanic or Latino of any race were 0.95% of the population.

The median income for a household in the MSA was $35,890, and the median income for a family was $42,085. Males had a median income of $31,701 versus $21,702 for females. The per capita income for the MSA was $18,073.

County or equivalent	Seat	2025 Estimate	2020 Census	Change	Area	Density
Bedford	Bedford	83,059	79,462	+4.53%	566 sq mi (1,470 km^{2})	108/sq mi (42/km^{2})
Lynchburg city	—	81,347	79,009	+2.96%	50 sq mi (129 km^{2})	1,627/sq mi (628/km^{2})
Campbell	Rustburg	55,629	55,696	−0.12%	539 sq mi (1,400 km^{2})	110/sq mi (42/km^{2})
Amherst	Amherst	31,962	31,307	+2.09%	430 sq mi (1,100 km^{2})	67/sq mi (26/km^{2})
Appomattox	Appomattox	17,172	16,119	+6.53%	500 sq mi (1,300 km^{2})	51/sq mi (20/km^{2})
Total		314,834	307,614	+2.35%	2,048 sq mi (5,300 km^{2})	154/sq mi (59/km^{2})

== See also ==
- List of U.S. Metropolitan Statistical Areas in Virginia
- Virginia census statistical areas
