= Tornado outbreak of February 23–24, 2016 =

Weather event in the United States

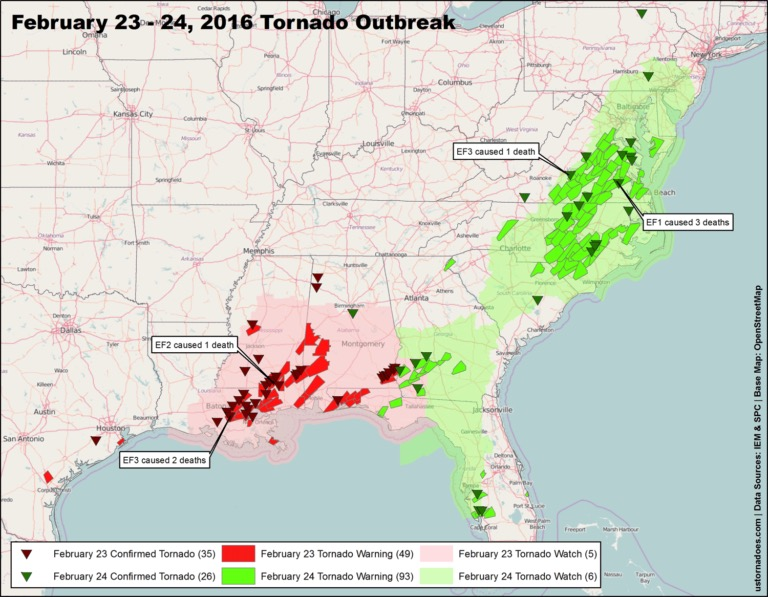
- Map of all the watches, warnings and confirmed tornadoes during the outbreak on February 23–24

Meteorological history
- Duration: February 23–24, 2016

Tornado outbreak
- Tornadoes: 61
- Max. rating: EF3 tornado
- Duration: 1 day, 13 hours, 48 minutes
- Highest winds: Tornadic – 155 mph (250 km/h) (Pensacola, FL EF3 on February 23)

Winter storm
- Max. snowfall: Snowfall – 17.0 in (43 cm) near La Porte, Indiana; Ice – 0.7 in (18 mm) in East Sangerville, Maine

Overall effects
- Fatalities: 7 total
- Injuries: 136 injuries
- Damage: $1.0 billion (2016 USD)
- Areas affected: Southern United States, Eastern United States, Upper Midwest, Canada
- Part of the 2015–16 North American winter and tornado outbreaks of 2016

An unusually prolific and very destructive late-winter tornado outbreak resulted in significant damage and numerous casualties across the southern and eastern half of the United States between February 23–24, 2016. Lasting over a day and a half, the outbreak produced a total of 61 tornadoes across eleven states, which ranked it as one of the largest February tornado outbreaks in the United States on record, with only the 2008 Super Tuesday tornado outbreak having recorded more. In addition, it was also one of the largest winter tornado outbreaks overall as well. The most significant and intense tornadoes of the event were four EF3 tornadoes that struck southeastern Louisiana, Pensacola, Florida, Evergreen, Virginia, and Tappahannock, Virginia. Tornadoes were also reported in other places like Texas, Florida, and Pennsylvania. Severe thunderstorms, hail and gusty winds were also felt in the Northeastern United States and Mid-Atlantic states on February 24 as well.

In addition to the outbreak, non-tornadic impacts were felt in the Midwest, where the storm system produced blizzard conditions and cold temperatures in places including Illinois, Indiana, Michigan, and even parts of southern Ontario in Canada. Snowfall totals of up to 17 inches (43 cm) were recorded in parts of the hardest hit areas by the snowstorm.

== Meteorological synopsis ==
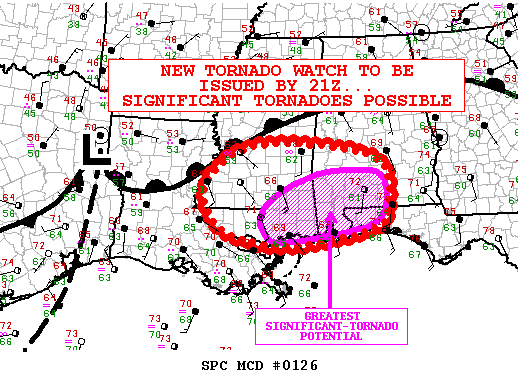
Mesoscale convective outlook from the Storm Prediction Center (SPC) highlighting the potential for significant tornadoes in parts of the Southeast on February 23.

On February 23, a low pressure area developed near the east end of Texas and began to track northeastwards. The Storm Prediction Center issued a moderate risk for severe weather across parts of Louisiana, Mississippi, Alabama, Georgia, and the Florida Panhandle, including a 15% risk area for tornadoes. The first significant tornadoes of the outbreak moved across southeastern Louisiana and southern Mississippi that evening, leaving significant damage and three deaths. The towns of Livingston and Laplace, Louisiana sustained heavy damage from strong EF2 tornadoes, and another EF2 tornado near Purvis, Mississippi killed one person in a mobile home. An EF3 tornado also caused major structural damage in Paincourtville, Louisiana before destroying an RV park near Convent, killing two people at that location. Three simultaneous waterspouts were observed over Lake Pontchartrain during the event as well. Later that night, a large supercell thunderstorm developed over the Gulf of Mexico and moved ashore, producing a destructive EF3 tornado in Pensacola, Florida. The tornado injured three people and destroyed homes, townhouses, apartments, and a GE warehouse.

Overnight into the early hours of February 24, the low-pressure area moved into the Mid-Atlantic States. With conditions continuing to favor widespread severe weather, the Storm Prediction center issued another moderate risk for Far South-Central Virginia and Central North Carolina in their 0600 UTC update, although it was originally because of a 45% hatched area of damaging winds. At the 1300 UTC outlook, however, that was omitted and replaced with another 15% hatched risk area for tornadoes across Southeastern Virginia and Eastern North Carolina. Strong tornadoes impacted the East Coast states of Virginia, Pennsylvania, and North Carolina on February 24 with many other tornadoes occurring elsewhere. An EF1 tornado struck the town of Waverly, Virginia, killing three people in a mobile home. An EF3 tornado struck the town of Evergreen, Virginia, causing severe damage and killing one person at that location. An EF2 tornado caused major damage to homes near Oxford, North Carolina, and another EF2 tornado touched down near White Horse, Pennsylvania, damaging up to 50 structures in the area. Another EF3 tornado occurred later that night near the Virginia town of Tappahannock, destroying multiple homes along its path. About 35,000 people in Virginia, 4,000 in Washington, D.C., and 47,000 in the Carolinas lost power due to the storms. Seven people in total were killed by tornadoes during the outbreak, and a total of 61 tornadoes were confirmed.

== Confirmed tornadoes ==
Confirmed tornadoes by Enhanced Fujita rating
EFU	EF0	EF1	EF2	EF3	EF4	EF5	Total
0	23	29	5	4	0	0	61

=== February 23 event ===
List of confirmed tornadoes – Tuesday, February 23, 2016 (Note: All dates are based on the local time zone where the tornado touched down; however, all times are in Coordinated Universal Time for consistency.)
EF#	Location	County / Parish	State	Start Coord.	Time (UTC)	Path length	Max width	Damage (2016 USD)
EF0	ESE of Boling-Iago	Wharton	TX	29.2382°N 95.8865°W	1153–1157	2.02 mi (3.25 km)	30 yd (27 m)	$0
EF0	A brief, narrow tornado destroyed three sheds and damaged three homes.							
EF0	Southwestern Kenner	Jefferson	LA	29.9757°N 90.2727°W	1711–1713	0.58 mi (0.93 km)	50 yd (46 m)	Unknown
EF0	A weak tornado developed close to the Mississippi River in the southwest part of Kenner, removing roofing shingles from one home. A church's poorly attached brick facade collapsed, and a small shed was destroyed. A nearby utility pole was downed as well. The tornado also destroyed part of another home's roof and damaged a tin awning. Further along the path, an air conditioning unit and a storage structure were damaged. One tree was snapped near the end of the path.							
EF0	SW of White Castle	Iberville	LA	30.1324°N 91.1811°W	1720–1725	3.32 mi (5.34 km)	50 yd (46 m)	Unknown
EF0	Tin roofs were peeled back and power lines were damaged. Tree limbs were broken off as well.							
EF0	Prairieville	Ascension	LA	30.3176°N 90.9804°W	1808–1813	1.61 mi (2.59 km)	200 yd (180 m)	Unknown
EF0	A Gold's Gym had its metal roofing torn off, allowing wind to rush into the building and blow out one of the exterior walls. Several businesses nearby sustained damage to their roofs and siding. Garage doors at a mechanic shop were blown in, and a Popeyes sign was blown over. Homes in town also sustained additional minor damage to outbuildings, roofs, and patios.							
EF2	Western Livingston	Livingston	LA	30.496°N 90.7592°W	1842–1851	4.33 mi (6.97 km)	625 yd (572 m)	Unknown
EF2	A few homes had their roofs torn off while others sustained lesser damage. One of the homes sustained some failure of exterior walls, and a large commercial building sustained major roof damage. A tractor trailer was lifted and flipped onto several large storage containers, and many trees were snapped and uprooted along the path.							
EF0	ENE of Montpelier	St. Helena	LA	30.6935°N 90.5878°W	1914–1915	0.3 mi (0.48 km)	50 yd (46 m)	Unknown
EF0	A single–wide mobile home was shifted off of its block piers and lost part of its metal roof. A metal shed was destroyed and a few softwood trees were snapped as well.							
EF1	SE of Baldwin	St. Mary	LA	29.8177°N 91.538°W	2037–2039	2.62 mi (4.22 km)	50 yd (46 m)	$40,000
EF1	A total of 28 homes and two businesses were damaged by this high-end EF1 tornado. A restaurant and several mobile homes lost a majority of their metal roofs, a few homes were shifted off their pilings, and other homes sustained damage to their windows, sheet metal, garages, and carports. Many trees and at least 20 power poles were snapped.							
EF0	SW of White Castle	Iberville	LA	30.1199°N 91.1733°W	2110–2113	1.03 mi (1.66 km)	200 yd (180 m)	Unknown
EF0	Garage doors were blown in, some structures sustained light roof damage, and sheds were demolished. One frail home had much of its poorly attached roof blown off.							
EF3	SW of Paincourtville to NE of Convent	Assumption, St. James	LA	29.9903°N 91.0794°W	2121–2142	20.73 mi (33.36 km)	350 yd (320 m)	Unknown
EF3	2 deaths – See section on this tornado – 75 people were injured, some critically.							
EF1	WSW of Bogue Chitto	Lincoln	MS	31.3955°N 90.5334°W	2145–2147	0.46 mi (0.74 km)	75 yd (69 m)	$40,000
EF1	Many large trees were snapped and uprooted, one of which landed on a home and caused minor roof damage. Skirting was blown off a mobile home and into a pasture. A feed house was damaged, with tin being strewn around.							
EF1	SW of Poplarville	Pearl River	MS	30.686°N 89.7812°W	2149–2201	9.52 mi (15.32 km)	150 yd (140 m)	Unknown
EF1	Five homes were damaged, one of which had its metal roof ripped off. Numerous trees were downed along the path and a metal shed was destroyed.							
EF1	E of Angie, LA to E of Sandy Hook	Pearl River, Marion	MS	30.9619°N 89.7115°W	2150–2158	5.15 mi (8.29 km)	200 yd (180 m)	$25,000
EF1	A mobile home was shifted off its foundation, and trees and large branches were snapped.							
EF0	WSW of Baxterville	Lamar	MS	31.0586°N 89.6481°W	2207	0.1 mi (0.16 km)	25 yd (23 m)	$5,000
EF0	Several trees were snapped and uprooted.							
EF1	Akers	St. John the Baptist	LA	30.2195°N 90.4354°W	2215–2217	3.15 mi (5.07 km)	250 yd (230 m)	$0
EF1	Multiple cypress trees were snapped by a waterspout that moved ashore.							
EF2	ENE of Baxterville to NW of Purvis	Lamar	MS	31.1157°N 89.5159°W	2215–2223	5.63 mi (9.06 km)	100 yd (91 m)	$105,000
EF2	1 death – A double-wide mobile home was completely destroyed by this low-end EF2 tornado, killing one person. Debris from the home was scattered up to 125 yards away, and nearby car was rolled 75 yards. The roof of a chicken house was blown off, and multiple trees and power poles were snapped along the path.							
EF0	ENE of Reform	Pickens	AL	33.3941°N 87.9672°W	2222–2231	4.8 mi (7.7 km)	150 yd (140 m)	$0
EF0	Trees were snapped or uprooted, and a home and a shed sustained minor roof damage.							
EF1	SW of West Hattiesburg	Lamar	MS	31.2265°N 89.423°W	2229–2231	1.42 mi (2.29 km)	75 yd (69 m)	$10,000
EF1	Several trees were snapped and minor roof damage occurred. A mobile home was shifted off of its foundation and a shed was destroyed as well.							
EF2	Laplace	St. John the Baptist	LA	30.0732°N 90.5067°W	2232–2244	4.69 mi (7.55 km)	250 yd (230 m)	$0
EF2	A high-end EF2 tornado caused major damage in Laplace. Many homes and duplexes sustained severe damage, some sustaining total loss of roofs and exterior walls. One two-story house in town lost half of its second floor. A church and several businesses also sustained roof, window, and fascia damage. Trees, power poles, and light poles were snapped along the path, and some warehouse buildings were severely damaged as well. 17 people were injured.							
EF0	Madisonville	St. Tammany	LA	30.3779°N 90.1613°W	2241–2242	0.38 mi (0.61 km)	25 yd (23 m)	Unknown
EF0	An open air Coast Guard boat shed was destroyed. A bar had minor fascia damage as well.							
EF0	Benton	Yazoo	MS	32.8184°N 90.2652°W	2242–2244	1.15 mi (1.85 km)	100 yd (91 m)	$25,000
EF0	A weak tornado damaged trees, signs, and fences in town, with several trees snapped or blown down.							
EF0	NW of New Hebron	Simpson	MS	31.7717°N 90.0531°W	2246–2247	0.62 mi (1.00 km)	40 yd (37 m)	$13,000
EF0	A brief tornado snapped and uprooted trees.							
EF0	Lacombe	St. Tammany	LA	30.32°N 89.9692°W	2313–2315	1.5 mi (2.4 km)	75 yd (69 m)	Unknown
EF0	Plastic greenhouses were damaged at a nursery in town, two mobile homes sustained skirting and window damage, and homes sustained damage to their shingles, siding, and fascia. Multiple trees were uprooted along the path.							
EF1	SE of Sand Hill	Greene	MS	31.2627°N 88.7064°W	2325–2327	1.51 mi (2.43 km)	75 yd (69 m)	$100,000
EF1	Metal roofing material from a barn was lofted into a tree, with some structural damage to the barn observed as well. A trailer was overturned, a vehicle was moved, and numerous trees were downed or snapped as well.							
EF1	ESE of Sand Hill	Greene	MS	31.3112°N 88.6494°W	2332–2333	0.03 mi (0.048 km)	75 yd (69 m)	$25,000
EF1	A couple of trees were sheared off, snapped, or uprooted.							
EF1	W of State Line	Greene, Wayne	MS	31.4313°N 88.5348°W	2345–2347	1.6 mi (2.6 km)	150 yd (140 m)	$200,000
EF1	Numerous large trees were snapped or uprooted, and an outbuilding was destroyed by a falling tree. An old log cabin had its window panes blown out and large portions of its roof destroyed.							
EF1	S of Pigeye to WSW of Hackleburg	Marion	AL	34.2265°N 87.9189°W	0001–0005	2.22 mi (3.57 km)	300 yd (270 m)	$0
EF1	A tornado developed near US 43 and moved north-northwest, with damage mostly confined to trees. One garage and a home sustained negligible damage as well, with damage to the home's roof.							
EF0	ESE of Lumberton	Forrest	MS	30.9574°N 89.3334°W	0001–0009	3.92 mi (6.31 km)	75 yd (69 m)	$15,000
EF0	A power pole and a few trees were snapped.							
EF3	NW of Pensacola International Airport to SSE of Pea Ridge	Escambia, Santa Rosa	FL	30.4907°N 87.2052°W	0210–0221	5.67 mi (9.12 km)	300 yd (270 m)	$22,075,000
EF3	See section on this tornado – Three people were injured.							
EF0	SE of Wicksburg	Houston	AL	31.195°N 85.6067°W	0415–0419	2.76 mi (4.44 km)	200 yd (180 m)	$50,000
EF0	Barns and porches had their metal roofing uplifted and blown off, while trees in the area were downed.							
EF1	SSE of Pinckard to SE of Midland City	Houston, Dale	AL	31.2479°N 85.5317°W	0424–0430	4.83 mi (7.77 km)	200 yd (180 m)	$0
EF1	Numerous pine trees were snapped and uprooted.							
EF1	Northwestern Dothan	Houston	AL	31.2642°N 85.4491°W	0431–0434	1.63 mi (2.62 km)	350 yd (320 m)	$50,000
EF1	Homes sustained minor roof damage, and a concrete block construction baseball dugout was leveled. Power poles were snapped as well.							
EF1	NNW of Dothan to WNW of Kinsey	Houston	AL	31.2651°N 85.4106°W	0434–0439	3.66 mi (5.89 km)	900 yd (820 m)	$75,000
EF1	Five power poles were snapped, several houses and a barn sustained roof damage, and trees were damaged.							
EF1	WNW of Headland	Henry	AL	31.3531°N 85.3769°W	0438–0440	1.09 mi (1.75 km)	300 yd (270 m)	$50,000
EF1	Large trees were uprooted, a house sustained roof damage, an RV was overturned, and a shed was destroyed.							
EF0	NE of Balkum	Henry	AL	31.436°N 85.2071°W	0454–0455	0.4 mi (0.64 km)	100 yd (91 m)	$0
EF0	Large trees were snapped or uprooted, including one that sustained minor debarking.							
EF1	SSE of Wills Crossroads	Henry	AL	31.497°N 85.157°W	0502–0503	0.5 mi (0.80 km)	150 yd (140 m)	$0
EF1	Many large trees were snapped or uprooted.							

=== February 24 event ===
List of confirmed tornadoes – Wednesday, February 24, 2016
EF#	Location	County / Parish	State	Start Coord.	Time (UTC)	Path length	Max width	Damage (2016 USD)
EF1	NW of Blakely	Early	GA	31.4151°N 84.9804°W	0507–0512	2.24 mi (3.60 km)	350 yd (320 m)	$0
EF1	Many mature, healthy trees in a grove were snapped or uprooted.							
EF1	SW of Sasser	Terrell	GA	31.6405°N 84.4200°W	0555–0602	5.09 mi (8.19 km)	200 yd (180 m)	$0
EF1	Pine and pecan trees were snapped and uprooted.							
EF1	WNW of Warwick	Lee	GA	31.8496°N 84.0279°W	0626–0627	0.2 mi (0.32 km)	75 yd (69 m)	$50,000
EF1	The roof to a mobile home sustained significant damage, and a single-family home had its asphalt roof completely removed.							
EF1	SSW of Whigham to SSE of Akridge	Grady	GA	30.8601°N 84.3365°W	0745–0802	12.81 mi (20.62 km)	400 yd (370 m)	$20,000
EF1	A tornado primarily damaged trees and power poles, along with a few homes that were hit by falling trees. A mobile home with partial anchoring was displaced from its foundation, and several trees were snapped as well.							
EF0	SW of Columbiana	Shelby	AL	33.1593°N 86.6673°W	1004–1005	1.11 mi (1.79 km)	80 yd (73 m)	$0
EF0	A mobile home was partially shifted off its foundation, a home sustained minor roof damage, and trees were snapped or uprooted.							
EF1	S of Duette	Manatee	FL	27.54°N 82.20°W	1727–1739	8.58 mi (13.81 km)	50 yd (46 m)	$0
EF1	Tree trunks were snapped across a broad area.							
EF1	Ararat	Patrick	VA	36.5985°N 80.5038°W	1745–1747	1.4 mi (2.3 km)	800 yd (730 m)	$345,000
EF1	A half-dozen homes sustained roof damage; another poorly constructed house had its roof completely ripped off. Several outbuildings and fences were destroyed, a mobile home was blown off its foundation, and numerous trees were snapped or uprooted.							
EF0	ESE of Fort Lonesome	Hillsborough	FL	27.65°N 82.06°W	1745–1748	0.92 mi (1.48 km)	30 yd (27 m)	$0
EF0	Members of the public observed a tornado moving across an open field; it caused no damage.							
EF0	Warsaw	Duplin	NC	34.998°N 78.089°W	1757–1758	0.54 mi (0.87 km)	150 yd (140 m)	$5,000
EF0	Extensive tree damage was observed.							
EF0	WSW of Seven Springs	Wayne	NC	35.2169°N 77.9213°W	1810–1812	1.01 mi (1.63 km)	75 yd (69 m)	$50,000
EF0	Numerous trees were downed and branches snapped. A turkey barn and several mobile homes were damaged, and a shed and a fence were destroyed.							
EF1	SSE of Hopewell	Duplin	NC	35.16°N 77.974°W	1813–1814	0.17 mi (0.27 km)	100 yd (91 m)	$100,000
EF1	A brief tornado snapped eight power poles and blew the roof off of a mobile home.							
EF0	SE of Murdock	Charlotte	FL	27.0071°N 82.1425°W	1815–1816	0.22 mi (0.35 km)	50 yd (46 m)	$50,000
EF0	Numerous tree branches were snapped.							
EF1	NW of Harbour Heights	Charlotte	FL	26.9991°N 82.0391°W	1822–1827	2.72 mi (4.38 km)	100 yd (91 m)	$1,600,000
EF1	A total of 33 homes were damaged, including 28 with low to moderate damage and five with major damage. Numerous pool cages were destroyed, trees were snapped or uprooted, at least eight vehicles were picked up and moved, and power lines were damaged. One person was injured.							
EF1	Waverly	Sussex, Surry	VA	36.9922°N 77.1234°W	1931–1941	8.86 mi (14.26 km)	300 yd (270 m)	$2,615,000
EF1	3 deaths – Two mobile homes were destroyed, several homes and businesses were heavily damaged, and numerous trees were downed throughout town by this high-end EF1 tornado. Eight people were also injured. This was the deadliest tornado of the outbreak as well as the first deadly tornado to affect Virginia during the month of February since 1950.							
EF0	Eastern Colerain	Bertie	NC	36.1953°N 76.7638°W	1954–1955	0.48 mi (0.77 km)	50 yd (46 m)	$25,000
EF0	Several trees were damaged, and a small outbuilding was blown over.							
EF0	SE of Patrick to SW of Cheraw	Chesterfield	SC	34.5585°N 80.0328°W	2016–2025	8.89 mi (14.31 km)	70 yd (64 m)	Unknown
EF0	A weak tornado touched down three separate times between Patrick and Cheraw. Several trees were downed, and one tree had its top blown off.							
EF3	SW of Chap to Holliday Lake State Park	Campbell, Appomattox	VA	37.2283°N 78.8641°W	2027–2044	17.32 mi (27.87 km)	400 yd (370 m)	$11,210,000
EF3	1 death – See section on this tornado – Seven people were injured.							
EF1	NW of Durham	Durham	NC	36.0594°N 78.945°W	2100–2101	0.43 mi (0.69 km)	30 yd (27 m)	$100,000
EF1	Extensive tree damage was observed.							
EF0	WNW of Fork Union	Fluvanna	VA	37.7597°N 78.2912°W	2110–2120	4.42 mi (7.11 km)	350 yd (320 m)	$480,000
EF0	Numerous trees were uprooted, an outbuilding was destroyed, and several homes sustained damage to their shingles, siding, and gutters.							
EF2	NE of Oxford	Granville, Vance	NC	36.3496°N 78.5443°W	2132–2138	5.07 mi (8.16 km)	125 yd (114 m)	$600,000
EF2	Numerous trees were snapped or uprooted, several outbuildings were blown down or destroyed, and several cars and storage trailers were tossed up to 50 yd (46 m). Seven homes were damaged, including one that had its roof and some exterior walls blown away.							
EF1	WSW of Bracey	Mecklenburg	VA	36.6047°N 78.2435°W	2148–2155	5 mi (8.0 km)	150 yd (140 m)	$310,000
EF1	Numerous trees were snapped or downed, a few homes sustained minor roof damage, a home and a shed sustained minor structural damage, and a home was shifted off its foundation.							
EF3	N of Bruington, VA to SSE of Beauvue, MD	King and Queen (VA), Essex (VA), Richmond (VA), Westmoreland (VA), St. Mary (MD)	VA, MD	37.8001°N 76.9989°W	2334–0014	36.89 mi (59.37 km)	500 yd (460 m)	$10,038,000
EF3	See section on this tornado – 25 people were injured, some critically.							
EF1	NNW of Wyalusing	Bradford	PA	41.7153°N 76.2871°W	0020–0022	1.09 mi (1.75 km)	100 yd (91 m)	$25,000
EF1	A garage was heavily damaged, a couple of homes sustained roof damage, and trees were damaged. A tornado warning was never issued for this storm.							
EF2	NNW of Gap to NNE of White Horse	Lancaster	PA	40.01°N 76.0297°W	0038–0045	4.87 mi (7.84 km)	400 yd (370 m)	$8,000,000
EF2	Approximately 50 structures were impacted, including numerous farm outbuildings and barns that were destroyed. Two two-story homes lost a majority of their roofs, while other homes, farm buildings, and sheds sustained lesser degrees of roof and siding damage. A large one-room Amish schoolhouse was destroyed, and a large building with more than 100 people inside attending an auction inside had its roof ripped off. Additionally, a van with several passengers was blown about 10 feet (3.0 m) into a field, several large granite tombstones in a cemetery were blown over, and numerous trees were downed. Similar to the storm above, a tornado warning was never issued for this storm. This became the first EF2+ tornado in February in state history.							
EF1	ESE of Laneview to WNW of Litwalton	Middlesex, Lancaster	VA	37.7488°N 76.6854°W	0125–0133	6.06 mi (9.75 km)	150 yd (140 m)	$387,000
EF1	A garage sustained collapse of a brick wall, the roof was ripped off a house, and an outbuilding was destroyed. Numerous large trees were snapped.							
EF1	ENE of Mascot to SSE of Water View	Middlesex	VA	37.6485°N 76.6492°W	0135–0141	4.01 mi (6.45 km)	150 yd (140 m)	$677,000
EF1	A house was destroyed, a barn had its second story swept away, and another barn had its roof ripped off.							

=== Paincourtville–Convent, Louisiana ===
Paincourtville–Convent, Louisiana
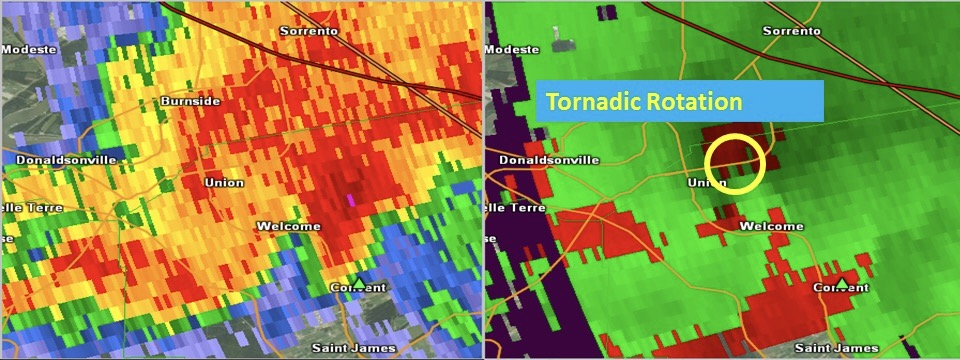
- Radar image of the supercell responsible for producing the EF3 tornado that struck the town of Paincourtville, Louisiana.

Meteorological history
- Formed: February 23, 2016, 3:21 p.m. CST (UTC−06:00)
- Dissipated: February 23, 2016, 3:42 p.m. CST (UTC−06:00)
- Duration: 21 minutes

EF3 tornado
- on the Enhanced Fujita scale
- Highest winds: 140 mph (230 km/h)

Overall effects
- Fatalities: 2
- Injuries: 75

This damaging rain-wrapped wedge tornado first touched down at 3:21 p.m. CST (19:21 UTC) on February 23 just southwest of Paincourtville, Louisiana in the parish of Assumption, and almost immediately intensified to high-end EF2 strength as it entered Paincourtville. Significant damage was observed to many residential and business structures in the northern portions of the town, across the intersections of LA 1, 308, and 70. A hardware store was largely destroyed, the town's water tower was toppled to the ground, a two-story apartment building was heavily damaged, and multiple frame and manufactured homes sustained severe damage, some of which were shifted off of their foundations. Multiple large trees were stripped and denuded in this area, industrial buildings sustained major damage, and a tractor trailer was flipped over. Many other homes sustained minor to moderate damage as well. Slightly further along the path, the tornado crossed Gus Caballero Road and Sweethome Road. Low-end EF3 damage occurred in this area as the second floor of a large, well-built brick home was completely destroyed. Wind speeds at this location were estimated at 140 mph (225 km/h), and two small frame homes nearby were completely swept from their pier foundations and destroyed with the debris strewn downwind. The tornado then exited the Paincourtville area and produced EF1 damage as it continued to the northeast. A total of 45 structures were destroyed and 44 others were damaged in Assumption Parish.

The tornado then crossed over the Mississippi River and continued at EF2 strength as it tracked into the parish of Saint James. Numerous trees were downed in this area and the tornado was at its widest at this point, with a damage path of up to 350 yards (320 m). The tornado ripped directly through the Sugar Hill RV Park near Convent with devastating results. Numerous camper trailers were tossed in all directions and destroyed at this location, along with multiple vehicles. Two people were killed at this park and around 75–80 others were injured, some critically. Multiple homes and a public housing complex also sustained major damage in the Convent area, and at least 25 homes were heavily damaged or destroyed in St. James Parish. The tornado began to shrink in size as it tracked further northeast, snapping and uprooting more trees and branches, before crossing LA 3125. The tornado began weakening and eventually lifted around 3:42 p.m. CST (19:42 UTC) just after it crossed US 61 (Airline Highway).

=== Pensacola, Florida ===
Pensacola, Florida
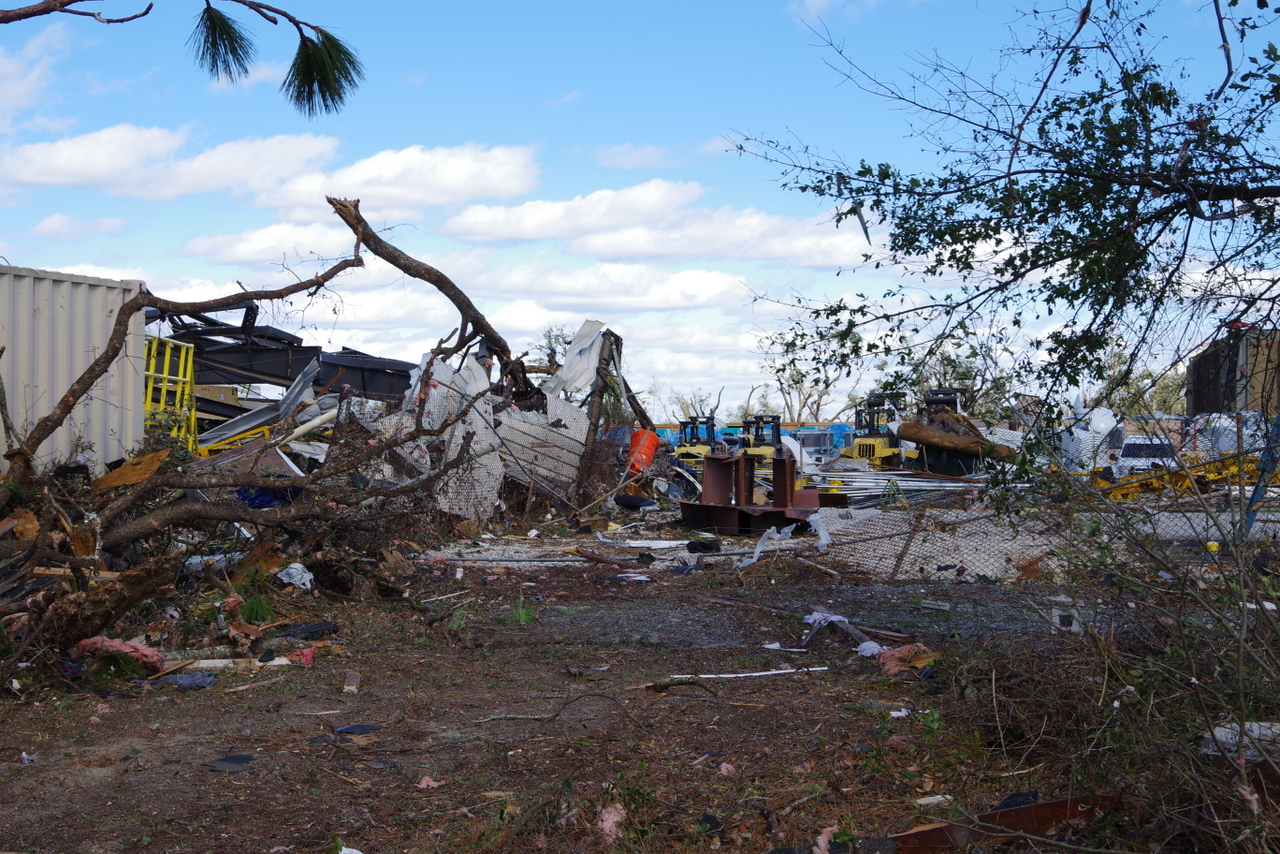
- EF3 damage at the GE plant in Pensacola, Florida.

Meteorological history
- Formed: February 23, 2016, 8:10 p.m. CST (UTC−06:00)
- Dissipated: February 23, 2016, 8:21 p.m. CST (UTC−06:00)
- Duration: 11 minutes

EF3 tornado
- on the Enhanced Fujita scale
- Highest winds: 155 mph (249 km/h)

Overall effects
- Fatalities: 0
- Injuries: 3
- Damage: $22.075 million (2016 USD)

A significant tornado caused EF3 damage in populated areas of northeastern Pensacola during the evening hours of February 23. The tornado first touched down at 8:10 pm CST (02:10 UTC), southwest of SR 742 and immediately strengthened to EF2 intensity. Several homes lost their roofs along Lansing Drive, and multiple trees and power poles were snapped. With their original warning on the storm set to expire at 8:15 pm CST and seeing that the rotation on radar had remained intense, the NWS Mobile office issued another PDS tornado warning for South Central Escambia and Southeastern Santa Rosa Counties at 8:11 pm CST, again stating that "a large...extremely dangerous and potentially deadly tornado is developing." The tornado then weakened slightly before crossing the concurrent I-10 and SR 8 as well as SR 289, inflicting EF1 damage to several hardwood trees. The tornado then strengthened back to EF2 intensity as it moved through multiple neighborhoods, where many trees and power lines were downed, multiple homes had their roofs torn off, and some sustained some loss of exterior walls. Two cars were also overturned along Tradewinds Drive. After this point, the tornado further intensified to EF3 strength. Major structural damage was inflicted to the Mooring Apartments on Old Spanish Trail Road, with 24 units being destroyed. The second floor of the apartment building was almost totally destroyed, with the roof ripped off and many walls collapsed. Some damage to exterior walls was also noted on the first floor, and six other units were damaged as well.

The tornado then reached its peak intensity of mid-range EF3 as it impacted a GE plant, completely destroying a warehouse with some of the debris from the structure being found on the western shoreline of Escambia Bay in Santa Rosa County. Farther to the northeast along the shore of the Escambia Bay, the tornado continued to produce EF3 damage as two townhouses along the concurrent US 90 and SR 10A were completely leveled, with others in the area suffering damage as well. The townhouses were built on raised wooden stilt foundations. The tornado then moved over Escambia Bay, where multiple vehicles were flipped and wrecked on the I-10 bridge. This included an 18-wheeler that overturned. The tornado then abruptly weakened before moving ashore in Avalon Beach in Santa Rosa County at EF1 intensity. The tornado then damaged multiple trees and homes near San Juan Street at Sealark Lane. It continued through the residential area, causing additional EF1 tree and minor home damage before lifting near Shetland Circle just west of Avalon Boulevard at 8:21 pm CST (02:21 UTC) east-northeast of Mulat. However, a debris ball was still present on radar, prompting the NWS Mobile to put out another strongly worded update that stated that "a confirmed large and extremely dangerous tornado" was in progress while cancelling the warning for Escambia County at 8:23 pm CDT, two minutes after the tornado had lifted. The warning was eventually allowed to expire without any further updates at 8:45 pm CST (02:45 UTC).

The tornado was on the ground for 11 minutes, traveled 5.67 miles (9.12 km), and had a maximum width of 300 yards (270 m). It had peak winds of 155 mph (249 km/h), giving it a rating of EF3. Three people were injured and damages were estimated at $22.075 million (2016 USD). It would be the last tornado of at least EF3 intensity in Florida for over six years, before a deadly, nighttime EF3 tornado killed two people near Alford on March 31, 2022.

=== Chap–Evergreen–Hollywood, Virginia ===
Chap–Evergreen–Hollywood, Virginia
- EF2 damage at the Central Baptist Church, in Chap, Virginia

Meteorological history
- Formed: February 23, 2016, 3:27 p.m. EST (UTC−05:00)
- Dissipated: February 23, 2016, 3:44 p.m. EST (UTC−05:00)
- Duration: 17 minutes

EF3 tornado
- on the Enhanced Fujita scale
- Highest winds: 145 mph (233 km/h)

Overall effects
- Fatalities: 1
- Injuries: 7
- Damage: $11.21 million (2016 USD)

This strong EF3 stovepipe tornado first touched down at 3:27 p.m. EDT (20:27 UTC) near the northern end of Campbell County, initially producing EF0 damage as it downed several trees. It then crossed into Appomattox County shortly thereafter, snapping more trees and damaging an outbuilding along County Line Road (SR 649) before reaching EF2 strength as it followed Berry Lane (SR 735) into Chap, where a church sustained collapse of its brick facade and had most of its roof torn off, a frail home lost its roof and exterior walls, and a manufactured home sustained minor damage. Further to the northeast, EF1 damage occurred as the tornado crossed Red House Road (SR 727) as many trees were snapped or uprooted and a small home was heavily damaged. Another home along Cub Creek Road (SR 644) sustained EF1 roof damage before the tornado began to re-intensify. EF2 damage occurred near the intersection of Cedar Bend Road (SR 675) and Cub Creek Road (SR 644), where a poorly constructed home was destroyed. Other homes in the area were damaged to a lesser extent. The tornado then strengthened further as it struck Evergreen, crossing over SR 681 as it moved through the center of town. One home was leveled at EF3 strength, and other surrounding homes were heavily damaged. Some outbuildings and manufactured homes were obliterated as well, with large amounts of debris strewn through fields in the area. The Evergreen Methodist Church sustained significant roof damage, and one fatality occurred in town as a man was killed in the destruction of his manufactured home. Massive tree damage was observed in the Evergreen area, with large swaths of trees in heavily forested areas snapped, uprooted, and denuded. Past Evergreen, the tornado crossed over US 460 and Rough Creek Road (SR 705) as it weakened to EF1 strength, downing additional trees and damaging an outbuilding as it continued to the northeast across Poorhouse Creek Road (SR 639), River Ridge Road (SR 627), and Hollywood Road (SR 618) southeast of Hollywood. Beyond this point, the tornado briefly strengthened back to EF2 intensity and ripped the roof off of a house along Webb Mill Road (SR 651). The tornado then entered Holliday Lake State Park and over the intersection of Holliday Lake Road (SR 626) and 4-H Camp Road (SR 723), snapping and uprooting many additional trees at EF1 strength before lifting and dissipating at 3:44 p.m. EDT (20:44 UTC).

Seven people were injured, and the tornado was the first February F3/EF3 tornado in Virginia since 1950.

=== Dunbrooke–Tappahannock–Naylors Beach, Virginia/White Point Beach, Maryland ===
Dunbrooke–Tappahannock–Naylors Beach, Virginia/White Point, Maryland
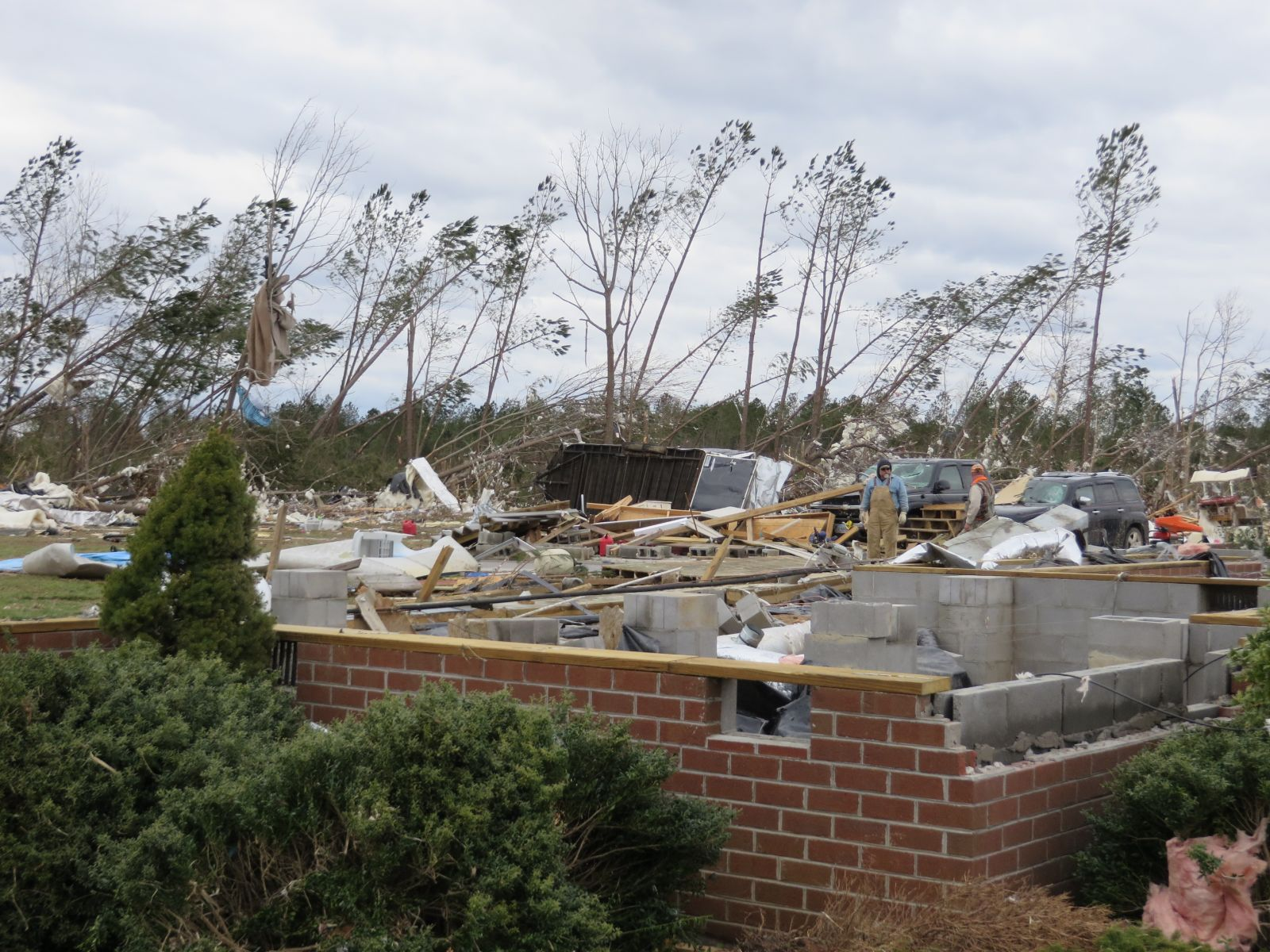
- Remains of a home swept away at EF3 intensity near Dunbrooke, Virginia.

Meteorological history
- Formed: February 23, 2016, 6:34 p.m. EST (UTC−05:00)
- Dissipated: February 23, 2016, 7:14 p.m. EST (UTC−05:00)
- Duration: 40 minutes

EF3 tornado
- on the Enhanced Fujita scale
- Highest winds: 145 mph (233 km/h)

Overall effects
- Fatalities: 0
- Injuries: 25
- Damage: $10 million (2016 USD)

This long-lived and destructive EF3 tornado initially touched down at 6:34 p.m. EDT (23:34 UTC) on Homlestown Road to the north of Bruington. It produced high-end EF1 damage as it moved to the northeast and passed just west of Miller's Tavern. Multiple homes sustained considerable damage in this area, one of which was destroyed. The tornado continued to intensify and reached peak strength as it crossed Kino Road to the east of Dunbrooke, producing EF3 damage and expanding to a width of up to 500 yards (460 m). Three poorly constructed frame homes, two double-wide mobile homes, and one double wide mobile home were all completely swept away and destroyed. Winds in this area were estimated at up to 145 mph (233 km/h), and multiple people were injured, some critically. The tornado then passed west of Tappahannock as a high-end EF2, causing major tree damage, destroying outbuildings, and severely damaging homes. It then crossed over the Rappahannock River shortly thereafter. Entering Richmond County as an EF2, the tornado caused major damage to the second floor of a two-story home as well as destroying several other smaller homes nearby as it impacted Naylors Beach directly. Past Naylors Beach, it weakened to a low-end EF1 before re-intensifying to high-end EF1 strength as it entered Westmoreland County and crossed SR 3. The tornado destroyed a mobile home while severely damaging two other homes in this area. Nearing Mount Holly, the EF1 tornado continued damaging multiple homes and uprooted several trees before crossing the Potomac River into the state of Maryland. The tornado weakened and shrunk in size, and as it moved onshore, it uprooted some trees in the White Point Beach area before lifting at 7:14 p.m. EDT. (00:14 UTC on February 25)

In total, at least 25 people were injured and the tornado caused at least $10 million in damages.

== Non-tornadic impacts ==
On the back side of the low-pressure area that brought the tornado outbreak along it cold front, some cold air began to interact with the moisture being drawn northward producing heavy snow and ice in parts of the Ohio Valley. Snow totals reached as high as 17.0 inches (43 cm) in some areas.

A truck flipped over on the George Washington Bridge due to 50 mph (80 km/h) winds on February 24 at 9:15pm. Wind gusts in Larchmont, New York reached 73 mph (117 km/h), while Bloomingdale, New Jersey recorded 3.10 inches (79 mm) of rain.

== See also ==
- List of North American tornadoes and tornado outbreaks
- Tornado outbreak and blizzard of April 13–15, 2018
- Tornado outbreak sequence of March 24–28, 2021
