= Spout =

Spout may refer to:

- A lip used to funnel content as on various containers like a teapot, pitcher, watering can, driptorch, grole, cruet, etc.
- A water spout from a roof, such as a gargoyle
- Downspout, of a rain gutter

== Natural and weather phenomena ==
- Spout, the action of a geyser
- Landspout, weather phenomenon
- Waterspout, weather phenomenon

== Waterfalls ==
- Spout, an alternate name for a waterfall
  - Spout of Garnock, waterfall in Scotland
  - Cautley Spout, waterfall in England

== Other ==
- Water spout, an element of a roller coaster element
- Air expelled through the blowhole of a whale

== See also ==
- Snout Spout, fictional character in the Masters of the Universe franchise
- Spout Run, a small stream in Arlington County, Virginia, US
- Spout Spring, Virginia, US
- Spout Springs, North Carolina, US
- Spout Springs Ski Area, Oregon, US
- Spouting can, physics experiment
- Spurt (disambiguation)
