= Grolla d'oro =

Italian film award

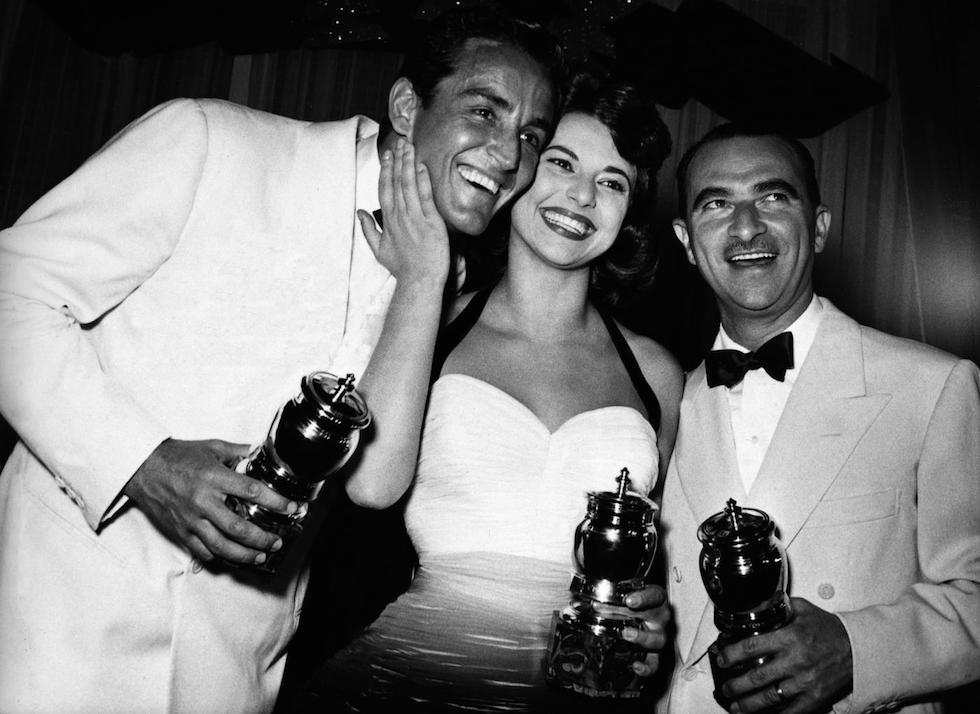
Vittorio Gassman, Giovanna Ralli and Alberto Lattuada awarded at the 1957 Grolla d'oro

The Grolla d'oro ("Golden Grole"; pl.: Grolle d'oro) is one of the oldest Italian film awards.

The award was founded in 1953 and ran until 1981; after some years of hiatus, it was relaunched in 1989 by journalist Maurizio Costanzo and, above all, by the film critic Felice Laudadio (1990–2001). The ceremonies are held in Saint-Vincent, Aosta Valley.
