= Stonewall, Virginia =

Stonewall, Virginia may refer to:

- Stonewall, Alleghany County, Virginia
- Stonewall, Appomattox County, Virginia
- Stonewall Mills, Virginia
