= Pamplin Pipe Factory =

Archaeological site in Virginia, United States

- U.S. National Register of Historic Places
- Virginia Landmarks Register
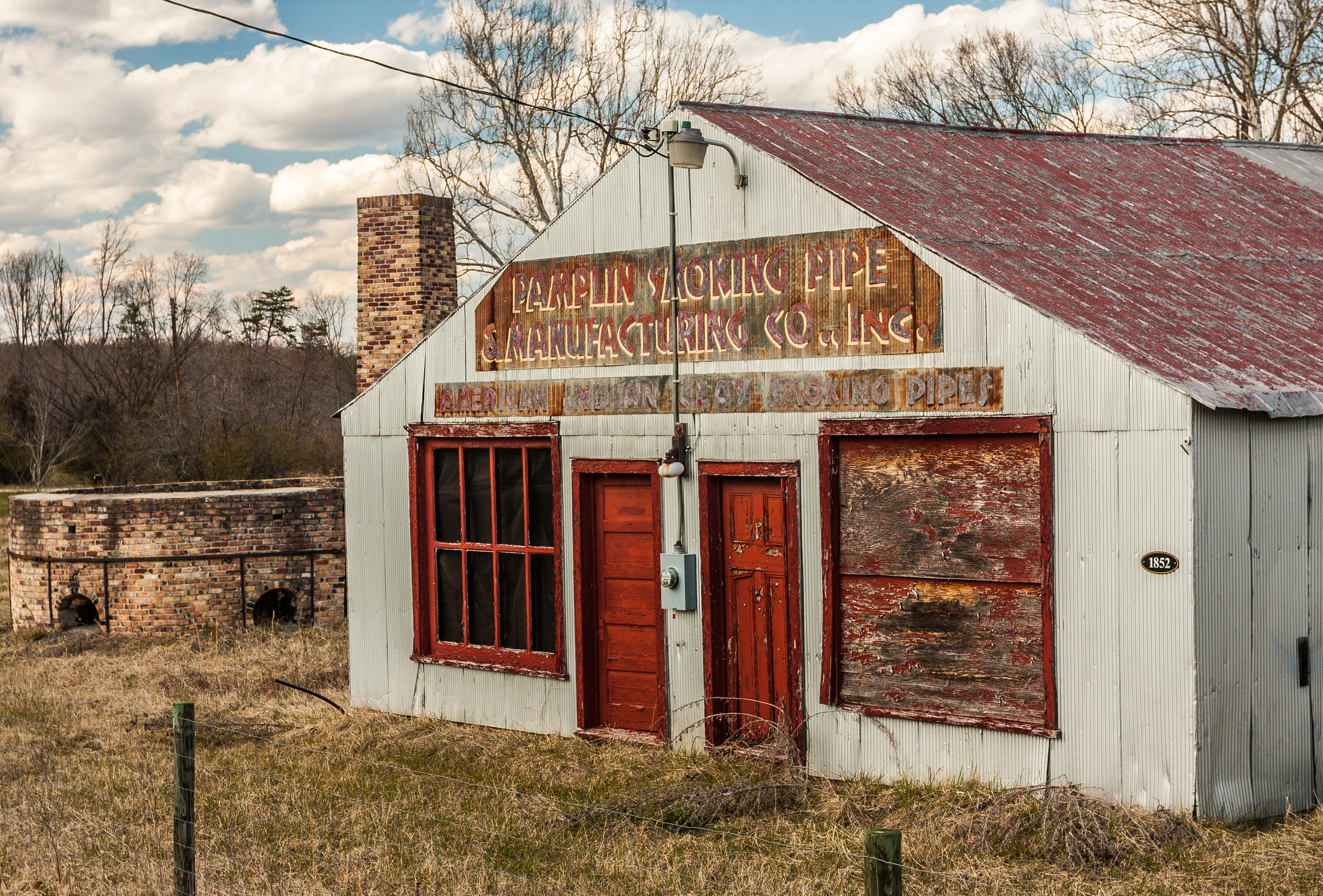
- Pamplin Clay Pipe Factory, March 2013

- Location within Virginia Location within the United States
- Location: Pamplin, Virginia
- Coordinates: 37.26293°N 78.67994°W
- Area: 2.9 acres (1.2 ha)
- Built: 1879
- NRHP reference No.: 80004169
- VLR No.: 277-0002

Significant dates
- Added to NRHP: November 25, 1980
- Designated VLR: June 1, 2005

Pamplin Pipe Factory, also known as Merrill and Ford, The Akron Smoking Pipe Factory, and The Pamplin Smoking Pipe and Manufacturing Company, is a historic factory and archaeological site located at Pamplin, Appomattox County, Virginia. Located on the property are a wood-framed factory building, a deteriorating brick kiln, and a collapsed brick chimney. It began operation about 1879 and was at one time the largest clay pipe manufacturer in the United States.

== History ==
Under several owners, the factory manufactured pipes through the peak of clay pipe manufacturing, around 1919, and until the business was sold at public auction in 1938. The post-1938 owners changed the focus of the company to novelty and souvenir pipes and retail sale of local home industry handmade pipes, but were unable to make a profit. The company was dissolved in 1952.

Clay pipes made at the Pamplin factory have been found in archaeological sites throughout the United States. Clay making tools from the site, and pipes, have been preserved at several locations.

It was listed on the National Register of Historic Places in 1980.
