= South Side Railroad =

South Side Railroad may refer to:

- Southside Railroad (Virginia)
- South Side Railroad of Long Island
