= Hixburg, Virginia =

Unincorporated community in Virginia, United States

Hixburg
- Unincorporated community
- Location within the state of Virginia Hixburg (the United States)
- Coordinates: 37°19′44″N 78°38′49″W
- Country: United States
- State: Virginia
- County: Appomattox
- Founder: William Hix
- Time zone: Eastern (EST)
  - Summer (DST): EDT
- ZIP codes: 23958
- GNIS feature ID: 1468078

Hixburg is an unincorporated rural community in Appomattox County, Virginia, located 4.9 miles (7.9 km) north-northeast from Pamplin City. The community once had a post office, tavern, and country store.

== History ==
William Hix established himself under the Wm. Danl. Hix. & Co. at Walker's Church in 1880, naming the nearby community around it Hixburg. He printed it out on his stationery and the name eventually stuck. The post office at Walker's Church was renamed to Hixburg in 1884.

During the American Civil war, Union soldiers captured Van Gilliam of Robert E. Lee's army on the retreat at his home near Hixburg. He was taken to Appomattox and was freed the next day.

== Notable people ==
- William Daniel Hix (son of Wilson Hix), wrote wills and deeds in Hixburg.
- John Henry Marshall, a leader of a community church.
