= Wilsons, Virginia =

Unincorporated community in Virginia, United States

Coordinates: 37°08′22″N 77°51′57″W

Wilsons is an unincorporated community in Dinwiddie County, Virginia, United States, along U.S. Route 460 between Petersburg and Blackstone. Several Civil War battles were fought in and around Wilsons, including the Battle of Five Forks. This town was a stop on the Southside Railroad in the mid-nineteenth Century. This became the Atlantic, Mississippi and Ohio Railroad in 1870 and then a line in the Norfolk and Western Railway and now the Norfolk Southern Railway. From the late 19th century through mid-20th century, it provided water for steam engines and the water tower remained a landmark of the town until the 1990s.

Today it maintains a U.S. Post Office for its few hundred residents, near the intersection of Springston Road and Cox Road (Route 460).
