= Southside Railroad (Virginia) =

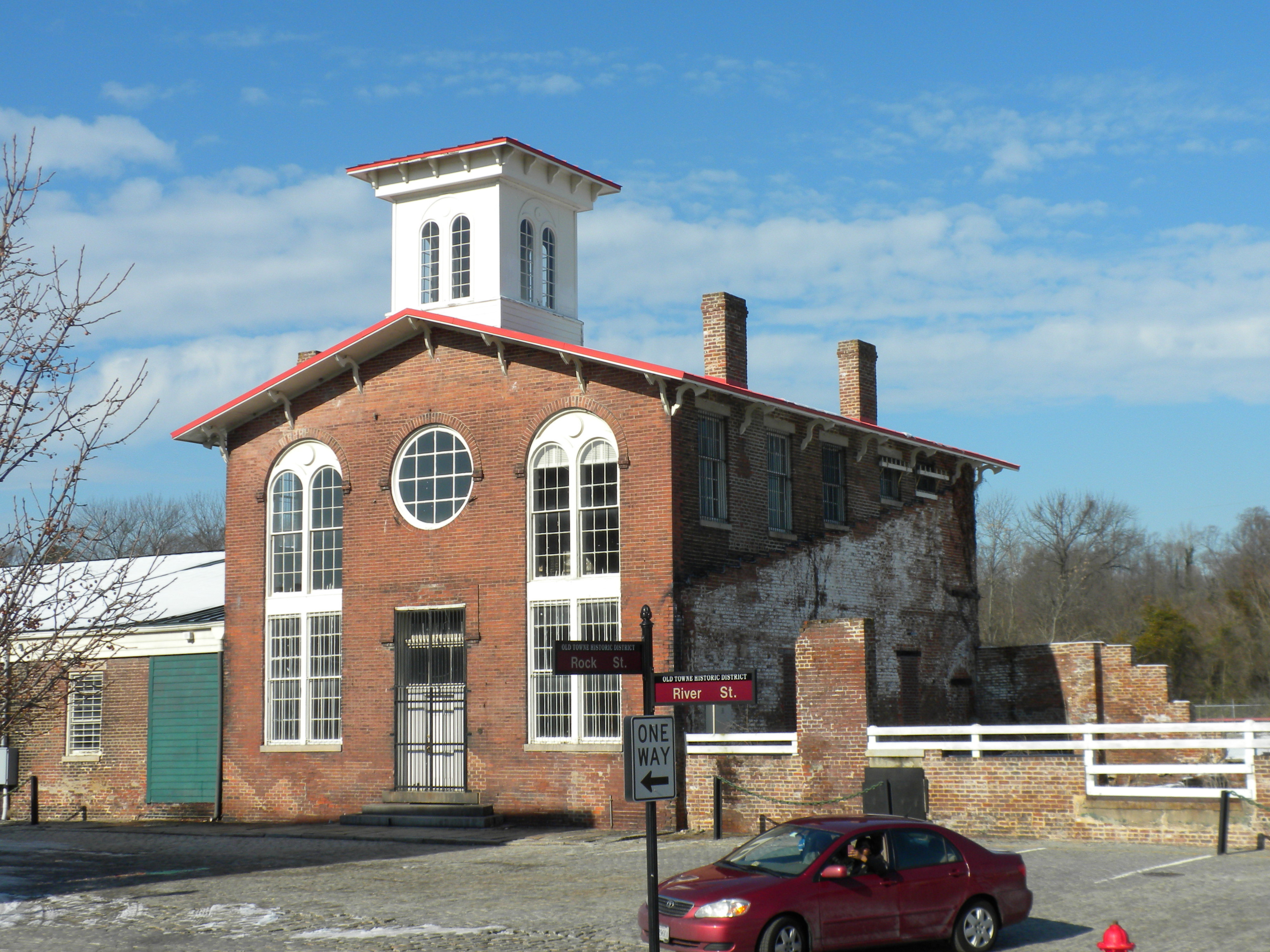
- South Side Railroad Depot in Petersburg, VA at corner of Rock and River streets, built 1851, 1853.

Overview
- Headquarters: Petersburg, Virginia
- Locale: Virginia
- Dates of operation: 1854–1870
- Successor: Atlantic, Mississippi and Ohio Railroad

Technical
- Track gauge: 5 ft (1,524 mm) gauge
- Length: 132 miles (212 km)

The Southside Railroad was a railroad in Virginia that operated independently from 1854 until 1870, when it was absorbed to form the Atlantic, Mississippi & Ohio Railroad (AM&O). The 5 ft (1,524 mm) gauge railroad connected the James River port of City Point with the farm country south and west of Petersburg, Virginia, to Lynchburg, Virginia, a distance of about 132 miles (212 km).

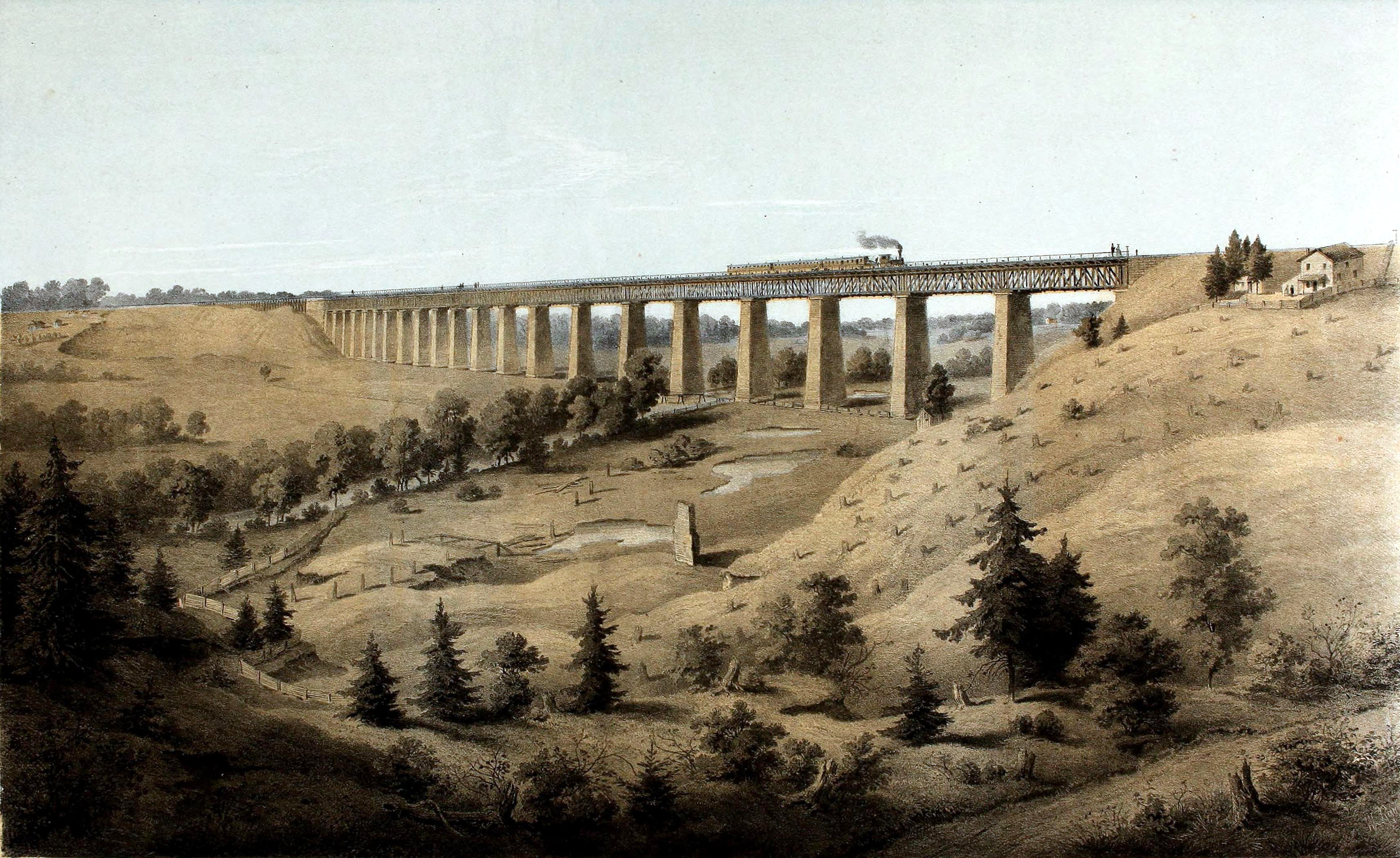
High Bridge near Farmville, Virginia in the 1850s

The Southside Railroad was important to the Confederate States of America during the American Civil War (1861–1865). Ravaged by the war, it was rebuilt and later became an important part of Norfolk and Western and Norfolk Southern's coal route from the mountains to port at Hampton Roads. It remains an active route in the 21st century, hauling coal, intermodal containers, and automobiles and parts.

== Charter, construction, City Point Railroad ==
The State of Virginia issued the charter for the new Southside Railroad in 1846, with a capital of $1 million directed towards the project. The state of Virginia gave its stock in the Petersburg Railroad to the city of Petersburg for the construction of the Southside Railroad. The stock was given on the condition that construction must start in three years or the stock would revert to the State.

The new board of directors began directing the extending of the line to Lynchburg to make a junction with the Richmond and Danville Railroad. The board purchased four and a half thousand tonnes of iron from England to be paid with cash and delivered by ship to City Point. They also purchased 20,000 sills, railroad ties, made of trees which resisted rot, Juniper, American chestnut and Post Oak to be delivered to the wharf. The board purchased land to build a depot. They hired an engineering team with one chief engineer, six assistant engineers and 17 enslaved Africans. To grade and build the whole line, they hired 16 contractors, each outfitted with a wagon, carts, teams of horses and the employ of almost 800 laborers in total. The city of Petersburg put forward over $400,000 and 44 investors invested $14,000. The City of Farmville bought a subscription of $100,000. Individual investors bought $150,000 worth of stock. The company could begin grading and building the railroad to Lynchburg.

Construction began from the eastern end in 1849, reaching Burkeville and a connection with the Richmond and Danville Railroad in 1852. (The latter was still also building east-to-west, but had been completed east to Richmond.)

Following a more circuitous route through Farmville in response to financial incentives from the community, the railroad constructed the famous 21 span High Bridge across the Appomattox River valley about 6 miles (9.7 km) east of Farmville. The structure was 2,400 feet (730 m) long and as high as 117 feet (36 m) in the center, one of the largest in the world when built.

The Southside Railroad was completed to Percival Island across the James River from Lynchburg in 1854.

Also in 1854, the Southside Railroad acquired the 9-mile (14 km) long City Point Railroad. It had been purchased by the City of Petersburg in 1847, and renamed Appomattox Railroad. Paralleling the Appomattox River from Petersburg to its confluence with the James River at City Point, the City Point Railroad provided an ideal link for the Southside Railroad to reach a deep water steamship connection on the navigable portion of the larger river.

== Connections and stations ==
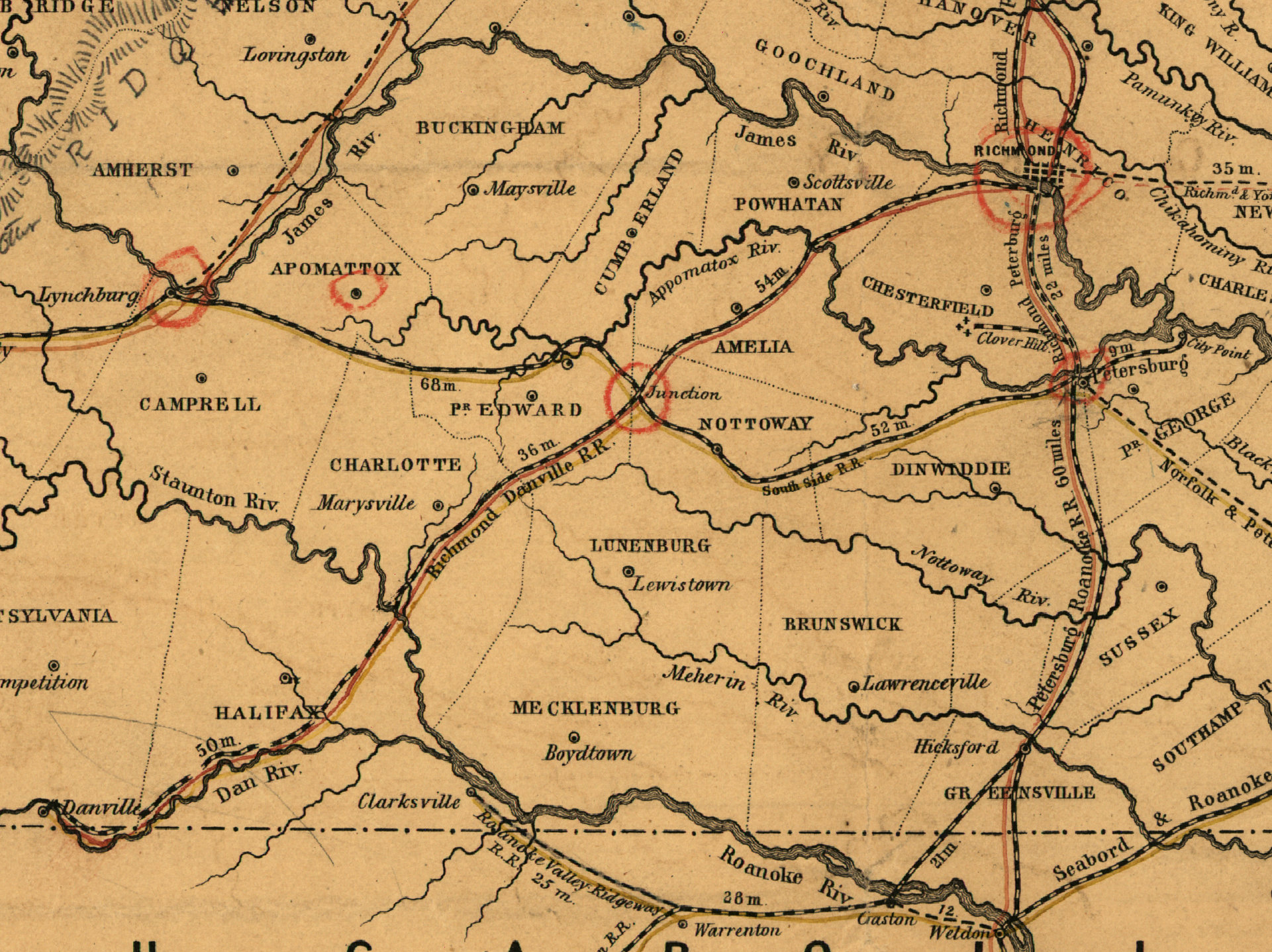
1852 railroad map by W. Vaisz, cropped to show the Southside Railroad

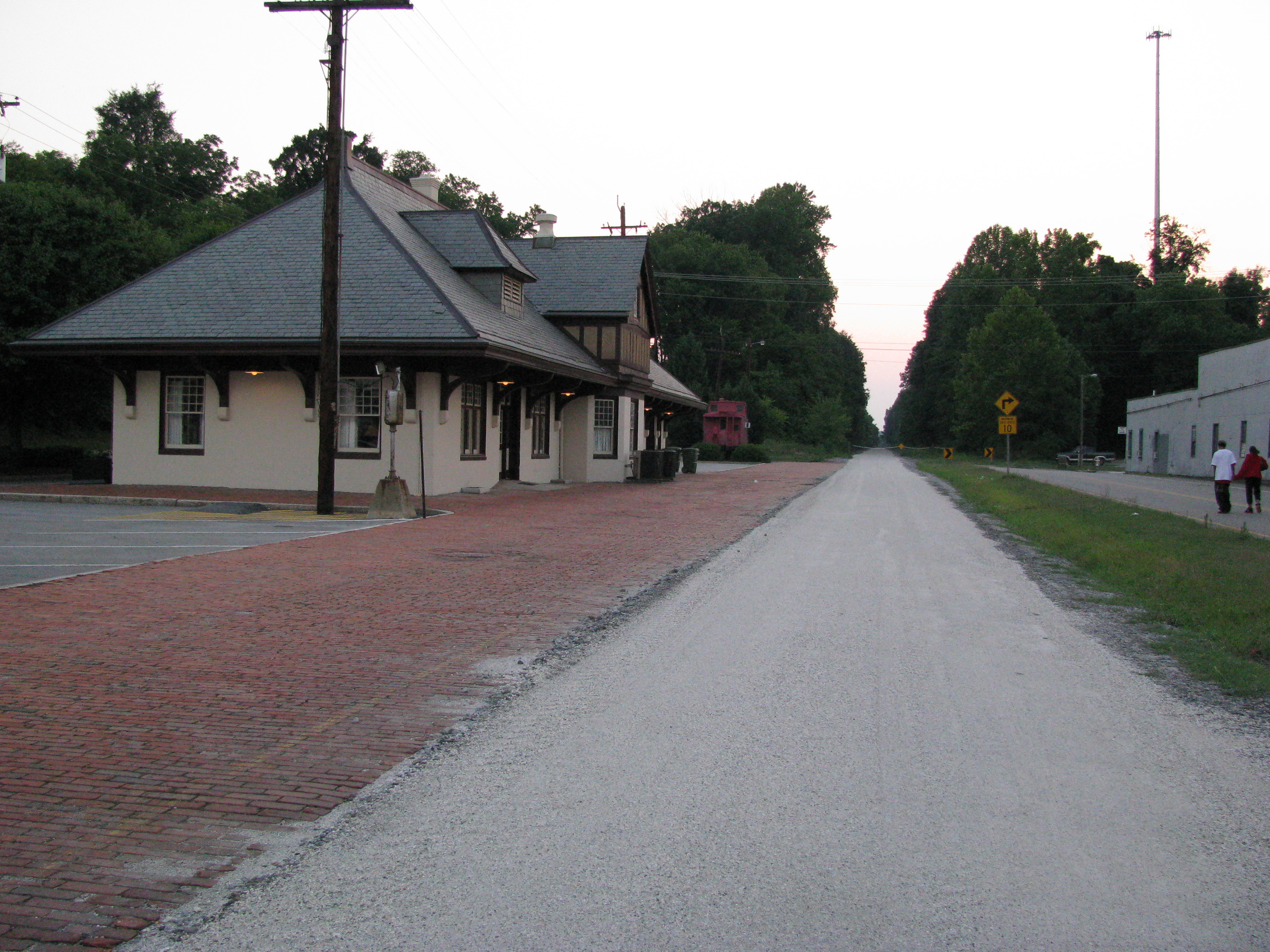
Farmville Train Station

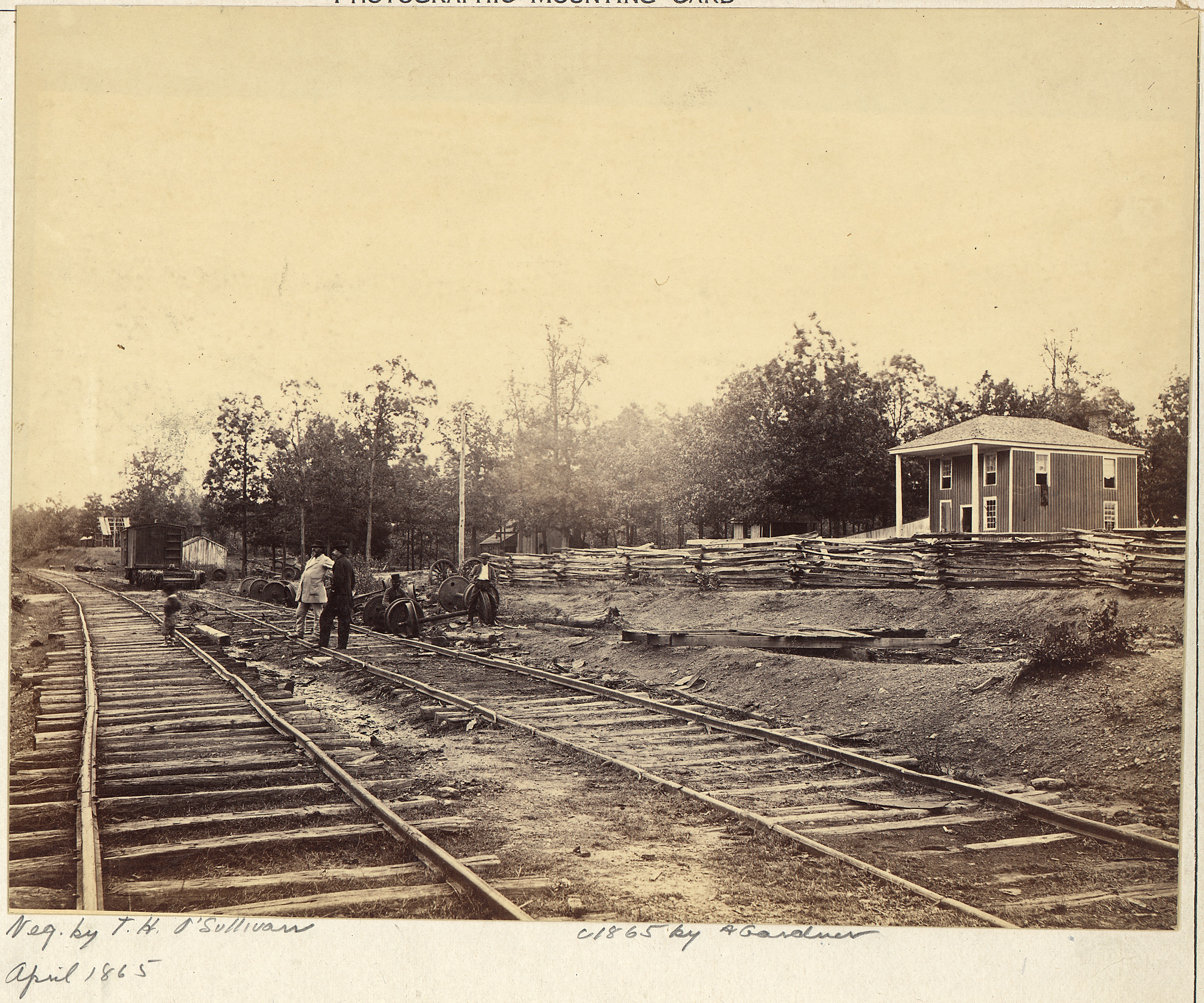
Appomattox Station 1865

South Side Railroad Stations City Point Spur (Formerly City Point Railroad) 9

Petersburg to Shops Spur 1

Main Line

1. Sutherland's 10 miles (16 km)
2. Ford's 20 miles (32 km)
3. Wilson's (Water stop) 27 miles (43 km)
4. Wellville 31 miles (50 km)
5. Blacks & Whites 37 miles (60 km)
6. Nottoway 43 miles (69 km)
7. Burkeville (Junction with the Richmond and Danville Railroad) 52 miles (84 km)
8. Rice's 61 miles (98 km)
9. High Bridge 65 miles (105 km)
10. Farmville 69 miles (111 km)
11. Prospect 80 miles (130 km)
12. Pamplin's 88 miles (142 km)
13. Evergreen 94 miles (151 km)
14. Appomattox 100 miles (160 km)
15. Spout Spring 106 miles (171 km)
16. Concord 111 miles (179 km)
17. Lynchburg 124 miles (200 km)

By late 1860, the Southside Railroad provided connections with the following other transportation entities:

- Petersburg
  - Petersburg Railroad extending south to Weldon, North Carolina
  - Richmond and Petersburg Railroad extending north to Richmond
  - Norfolk and Petersburg Railroad (after Sept. 1858) extending east to Suffolk and Norfolk
- Burkeville
  - Richmond and Danville Railroad northeast to Richmond, southwest to Danville
- Lynchburg
  - James River and Kanawha Canal east to Richmond, building west
  - Virginia and Tennessee Railroad west to Salem and Bristol and connections south and west extending all the way to New Orleans
  - Orange and Alexandria Railroad northeast through the Piedmont to Charlottesville and Alexandria

== American Civil War ==
The Southside Railroad from Petersburg west was a vital resource for the Confederacy as a supply line for Richmond and Petersburg during the American Civil War (1861–1865). Beyond the lines of battle until the war's last year, the principal damage it suffered was the financial weakness caused by Confederate compensation policies and currency. The Confederate States Army destroyed most of the rail around Petersburg. Half of the eight-mile City Point Railroad was completely removed and another two miles were beyond repair. Only two-and-a-half miles from Petersburg was the track even salvageable.

The United States Army rebuilt it. Lieutenant General Ulysses S. Grant requested a railroad to help with supplies for the Siege of Petersburg, knowing from past experience that it would be needed. Grant empowered Mr. C. L. McAlpine, engineer of construction and repairs, to rebuild the City Point to Petersburg Railroad, as soon as the fighting moved elsewhere. McAlpine commenced operations when he arrived on June 18, 1864.

The City Point Railroad portion of the Southside Railroad was of great value to the Union forces during the Siege of Petersburg in 1864-65. General Grant used and extended it to move supplies and troops from the port at City Point to the area south and east of Petersburg, operating it as a U.S. Military Railroad. In the last year of the Civil War, the U.S. Government rebuilt ten miles of tracks, a hospital and a bakery on the Southside Railroad and rebuilt trestle bridges.

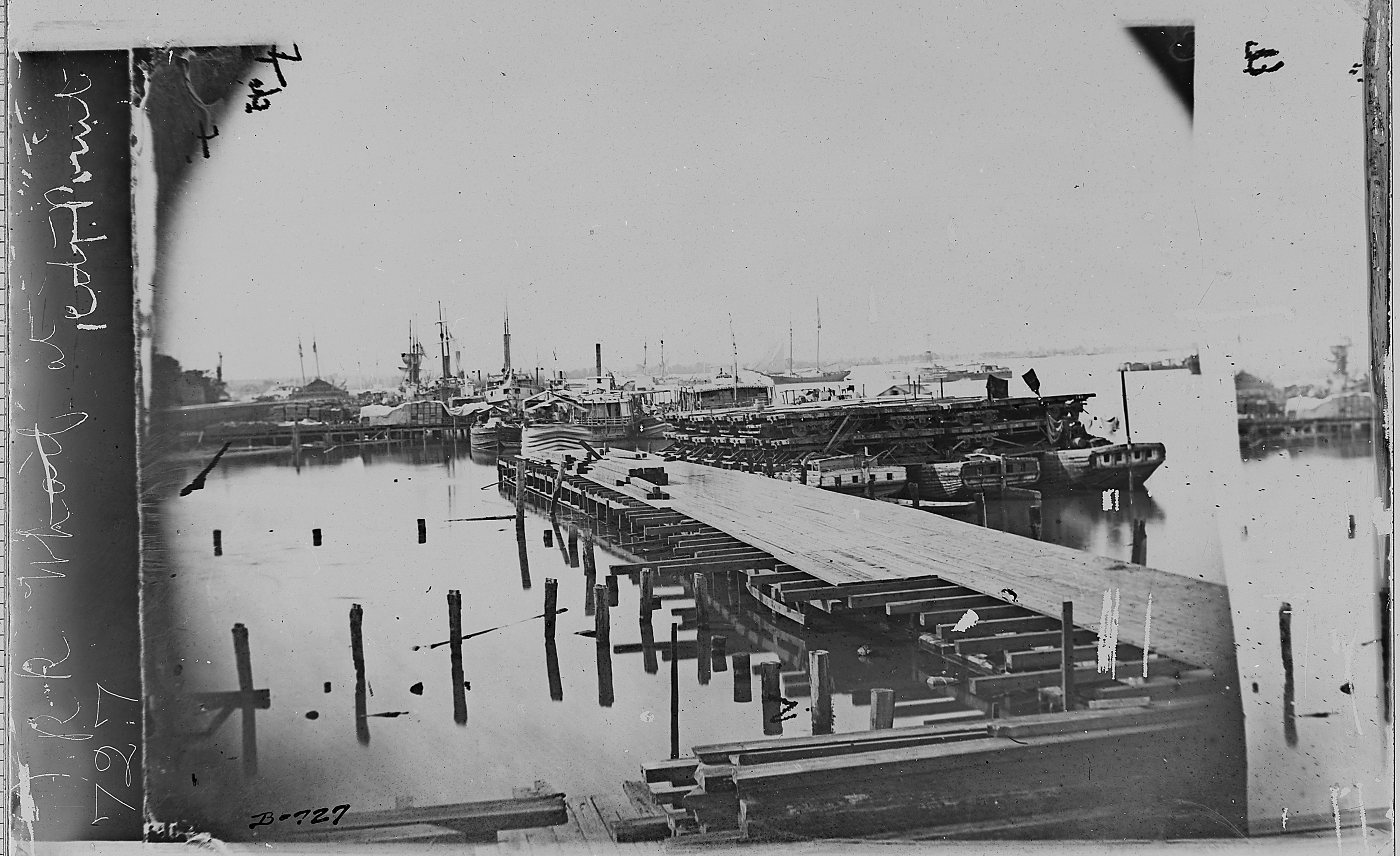
Railroad Wharf at City Point, Va. 28 railroad flat cars lined up on barges.

Stations & Waypoints of the Military railroad

1. City Point Terminus (Mile 0)
2. Hospital spur (Mile 1.5)
3. Wood Pile (Mile 2)
4. Cedar Level Station (Mile 4)
5. Clark's Station (Mile 4.25)
6. Pitkin's Junction (Mile 5.75)
7. Birney's Station (Mile 7)
8. Meade's Station (Mile 8)
9. "Shooting Hill" (Mile 9)
10. Hancock's Junction/Jerusalem Plank Road (Mile 11)
11. Gregg's Station (Mile 12 S)
12. Crawford's Station Terminus (Mile 13.5 S)
13. Parke's Station (Mile 13 N)
14. Warren's Junction/Weldon Railroad (Mile 14.5 N)
15. Patrick's Station Terminus (Mile 16 N)
16. Humphreys Station Terminus (Mile 18.5 S)

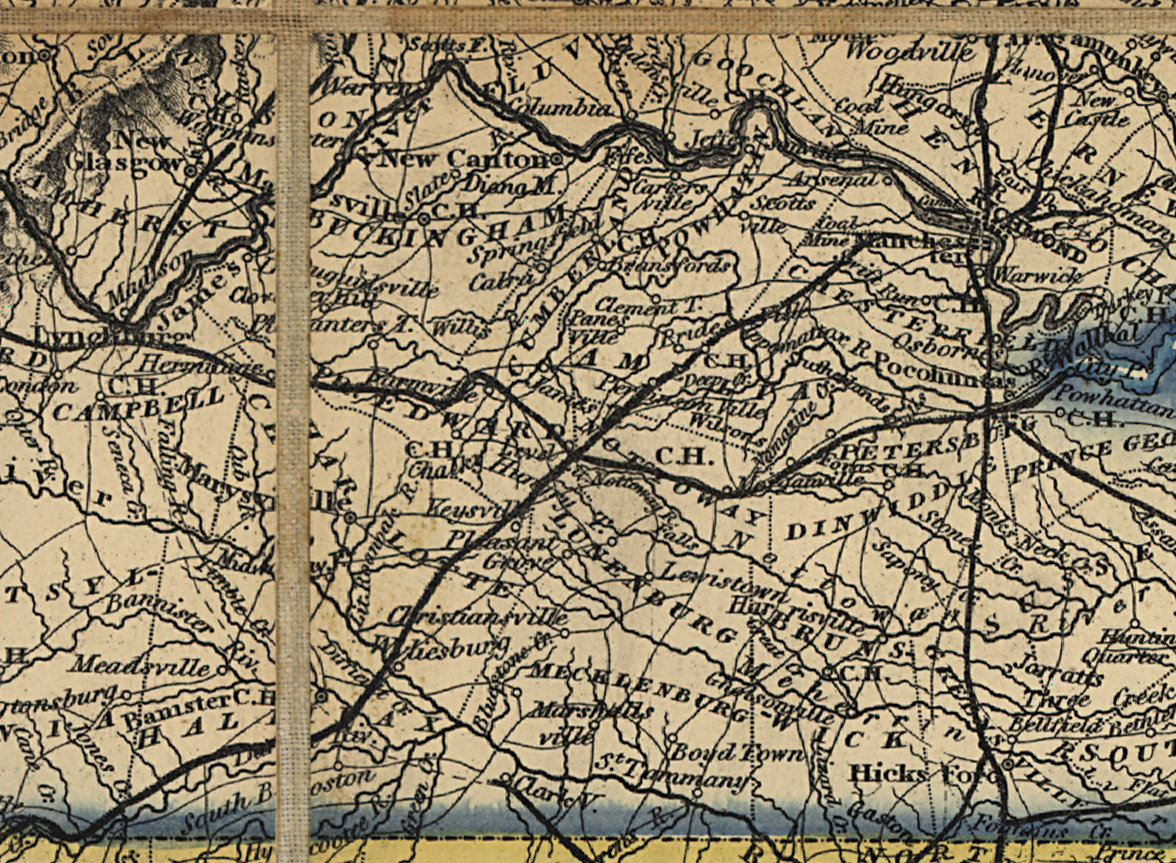
Map of the Southern States of North America, cropped to show the South Side Railroad in 1862.

== Merger into the Atlantic, Mississippi, and Ohio Railroad ==
After the War, the stockholders of the Southside Railroad elected former Major General (CSA) William Mahone, chief engineer on the Norfolk and Petersburg Railroad, as president of their road. He had some fame from his part in the Battle of the Crater. In the post-war years, William Mahone became the driving force in the linkage of N&P, Southside Railroad and the Virginia and Tennessee Railroad. He was president of all three by the end of 1867. Mahone wanted to combine them into a single entity and expand westward. He lobbied the Virginia General Assembly to gain the legislation necessary to form the Atlantic, Mississippi & Ohio Railroad (AM&O), a new line composed of the 3 railroads he headed, extending 408 miles from Norfolk to Bristol, Virginia in 1870. The former Southside Railroad formed one of three original A, M & O divisions.

== Southside Railroad today ==
The former Southside Railroad formed a major piece of the Norfolk and Western used to transport bituminous coal from the mines in southwestern Virginia and southern West Virginia to port at Norfolk, where a huge coal pier was built at Lambert's Point. Over 150 years after completion, much of the former Southside Railroad route remained in active use until 2005, when the corridor was abandoned and subsequently turned over to the Virginia DCR (Dept of Conservation and Recreation) for conversion to a rail trail linear park called High Bridge Trail State Park. Construction on the High Bridge began March 7, 2011 and the bridge was officially opened to the public April 5, 2012. The bridge itself was rehabilitated via a federal grant of $2 million. It is the namesake of the park. The trail is a total of 31 miles long and runs from Burkeville to Pamplin City. Both ends terminate just before their destinations, however the park service is currently working with the railroad to acquire the end caps to complete the trail.

== Presidents ==
- William Pannill (August 22, 1849 – 1856)
- Thomas H. Campbell (1857 – 1860 or after)
- Lemuel Peebles (1860 or after – December 1865)
- William Mahone (December 1865 – 1870)
