= Pamplin City, Virginia =

- Town
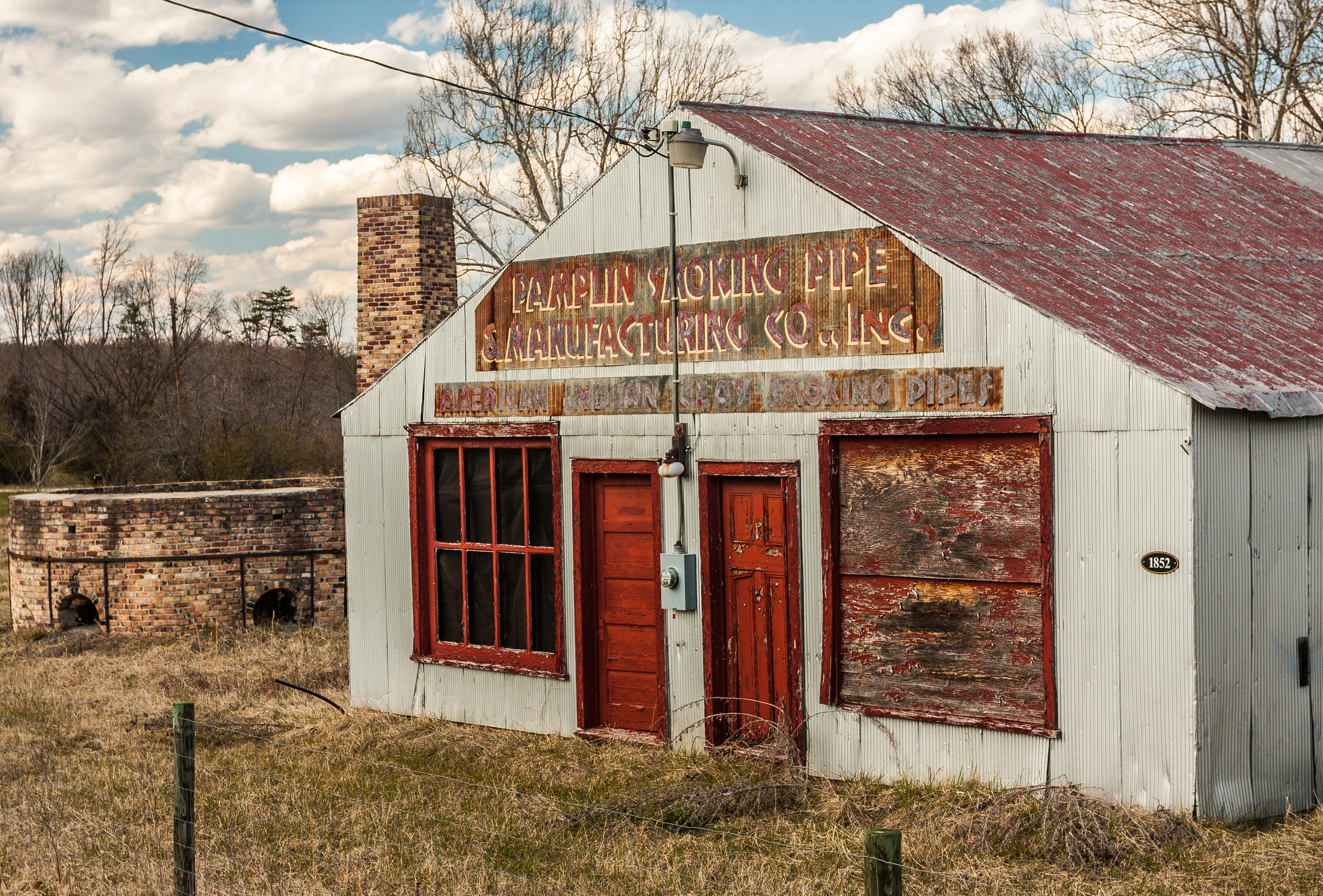
- The Pamplin Pipe Factory, a federally designated historic site

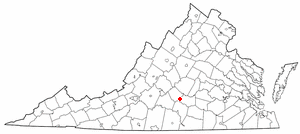
- Location of Pamplin City, Virginia
- Coordinates: 37°15′49″N 78°40′52″W
- Country: United States
- State: Virginia
- Counties: Appomattox, Prince Edward

Government
  - Type: Elected Town Council
  - Mayor: Sarah Hamlett Blackwell
  - Town Council: John Marks, Patricia Miller, Ronald Franklin, Shannon Reed, Ken Swanson, and Ruth Williamson

Area
  - Total: 0.32 sq mi (0.82 km^{2})
  - Land: 0.32 sq mi (0.82 km^{2})
  - Water: 0 sq mi (0.00 km^{2})

Population (2020)
  - Total: 138
  - Density: 437/sq mi (168.6/km^{2})
- Time zone: UTC-5 (Eastern (EST))
  - Summer (DST): UTC-4 (EDT)
- Federal Postal Code: 23958
- Area code: 434
- FIPS code: 51-60488

Pamplin City is a town in Appomattox and Prince Edward counties in the U.S. state of Virginia. The population was 138 at the 2020 United States census.

The Appomattox County portion of Pamplin City is part of the Lynchburg metropolitan area.

== History ==
Pamplin is the home of the Pamplin Pipe Factory, formerly the largest clay pipe factory in the United States. It is located to the side of Business 460. It was listed on the National Register of Historic Places (NRHP) in 1980. The Buffalo Presbyterian Church was listed on the NRHP in 1995.

This town was a stop on the Southside Railroad in the mid-19th century. This became the Atlantic, Mississippi and Ohio Railroad in 1870 and then a line in the Norfolk and Western Railway and now the Norfolk Southern Railway. The rail line from Burkeville to Pamplin City was converted by Virginia Department of Parks and Recreation into High Bridge Trail State Park.

Previously, the High Bridge Trail ended at Heights School Road approximately one mile from the town. In a partnership with The Virginia Department of Conservation and Recreation, Appomattox and Prince Edward Counties the Town has been able to have trail extended into the corporate limits and end within walking distance of the Main Street business district. This project has been vital to the economic redevelopment and revitalization efforts of the town. The Pamplin trail extension was opened April 22, 2024.

== Geography ==
Pamplin City is located at 37°15′49″N 78°40′52″W (37.263523, -78.680985).

According to the United States Census Bureau, the town has a total area of 0.3 square miles (0.8 km^{2}), all land.

== Demographics ==
Historical population
Census	Pop.	Note	%±
1880	117		—
1890	294		151.3%
1910	210		—
1920	262		24.8%
1930	323		23.3%
1940	273		−15.5%
1950	370		35.5%
1960	312		−15.7%
1970	394		26.3%
1980	273		−30.7%
1990	208		−23.8%
2000	199		−4.3%
2010	219		10.1%
2020	138		−37.0%
2022 (est.)	146	▲	5.8%
U.S. Decennial Census

As of the census of 2020, there were 138 people and 89 households residing in the town. The population density was 431.25 people per square mile (168.29/km^{2}). There were 89 housing units at an average density of 292.3 per square mile (114.5/km^{2}). The racial makeup of the town was 74.6% White, 23.2% African American, and 2.2% from two or more races. Hispanic or Latino of any race were 0% of the population.

There were 89 households, out of which 12% had children under the age of 18 living with them. 80% of households being owner occupied and 20% being renter occupied.

In the town, the population was spread out, with 25.9% under the age of 19, 0% from 18 to 24, 13% from 25 to 44, 37% from 45 to 64, and 18.5% who were 65 years of age or older. The median age was 38.5 years. For every 100 females there were 150 males. For every 100 females age 18 and over, there were 110.5 males.

The median income for a household in the town was $38,980, and the median income for a family was $49,320. The per capita income for the town was $19,069. About 53.7% of the population were below the poverty line, including 92.9% of those under the age of eighteen and approximately 0% of those 65 or over.

== Education ==
The portion within Appomattox County is in the Appomattox County Public Schools school district.

The portion within Prince Edward County is in the Prince Edward County Public Schools school district.
