= Vera, Virginia =

Unincorporated community in Virginia, United States

Vera
- Unincorporated community
- Location within the state of Virginia Vera (the United States)
- Coordinates: 37°24′49″N 78°45′49″W
- Country: United States
- State: Virginia
- County: Appomattox
- Time zone: Eastern (EST)
  - Summer (DST): EDT
- ZIP codes: 24522
- GNIS feature ID: 1477779

Vera is an unincorporated community in Appomattox County, Virginia, United States. The community is located about 5 miles (8.0 km) east of the town of Appomattox, on State Route 24.

== History ==
A community existed here before it was called Vera, a name which local resident David Christian suggested, taking it from the Latin word for truth. A post office was opened in 1896. The "Vera School" was built in 1917, and eventually included a high school program. That school closed around 1970. A separate school for black students was called Canaan School, and lasted until 1956. Vera was the first community in the county outside Appomattox to get phone service, though it initially only served three customers.

The Appomattox County commissioners approved a cell phone tower in Vera in 2015, as the community did not have cell or wireless services at that time.

== Notable people ==
- U.S. Congressman Watkins Abbitt (1908-1998) lived in Vera.
