= Beckham, Virginia =

Unincorporated community in Virginia, United States

Beckham
- Unincorporated community
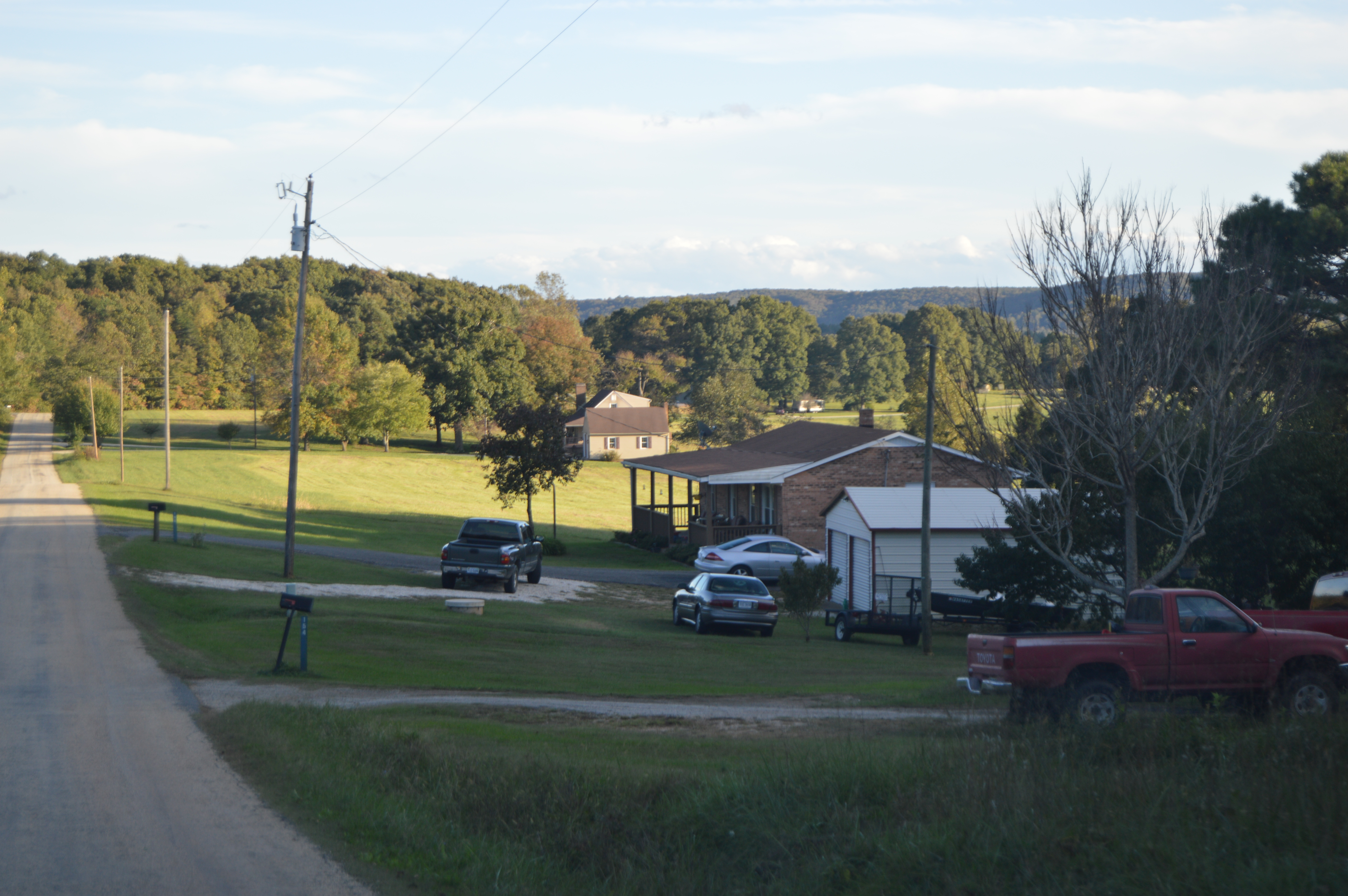
- Two houses on James River Road

- Location within the state of Virginia Beckham (the United States)
- Coordinates: 37°29′29″N 78°54′17″W
- Country: United States
- State: Virginia
- County: Appomattox
- Time zone: Eastern (EST)
  - Summer (DST): EDT
- ZIP codes: 24522
- GNIS feature ID: 1477102

Beckham is an unincorporated community in Appomattox County, Virginia, United States. It was a post village until some time in the 20th century.
