= Spout Spring, Virginia =

Unincorporated community in Virginia, United States

Spout Spring
- Unincorporated community
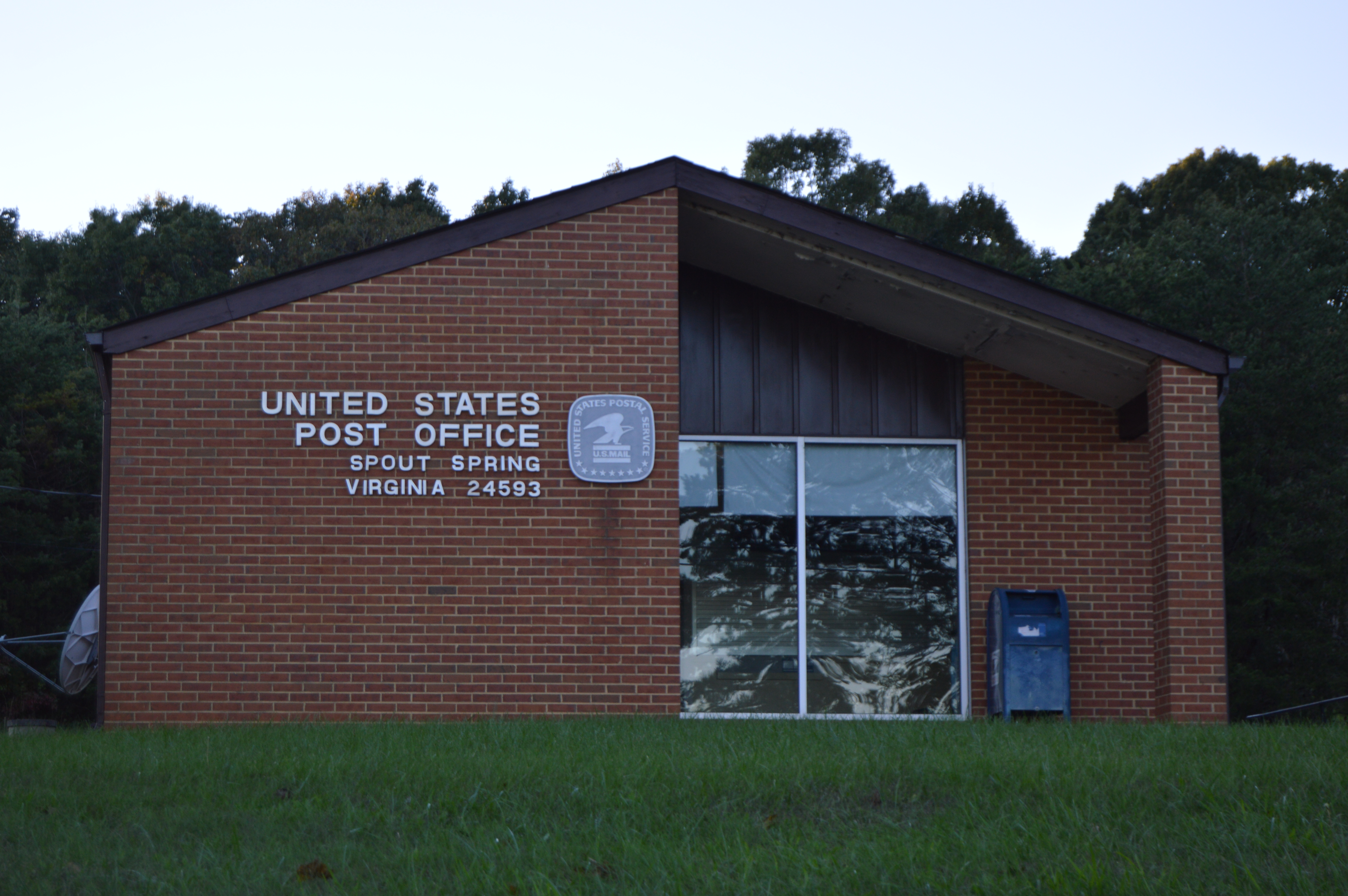
- Post office

- Location within the state of Virginia Spout Spring (the United States)
- Country: United States
- State: Virginia
- County: Appomattox
- Time zone: Eastern (EST)
  - Summer (DST): EDT
- ZIP codes: 24593
- GNIS feature ID: 1493636

Spout Spring is an unincorporated community in Appomattox County, Virginia, United States. This town was a stop on the Southside Railroad in the mid-nineteenth century. This became the Atlantic, Mississippi and Ohio Railroad in 1870 and then a line on the Norfolk and Western Railway and now the Norfolk Southern Railway.
