= Chap, Virginia =

Unincorporated community in Virginia, United States

Chap
- Unincorporated community
- Central Baptist Church EF2 tornado damage

- Location within the state of Virginia Chap (the United States)
- Country: United States
- State: Virginia
- County: Appomattox
- Time zone: Eastern (EST)
  - Summer (DST): EDT
- ZIP codes: 24522
- GNIS feature ID: 1477197

Chap is an unincorporated community in Appomattox County, Virginia, United States. The community had a population of 24 according to an 1893 atlas.

== History ==
The community had a post office from 1884 to 1907. It had a cafe in the 1950s.

Central Baptist Church is located in Chap. It was first built in 1893, and was rebuilt after being destroyed by a tornado on February 24, 2016. A 2018 local newspaper article described the building as "the 'signature structure' in the community of Chap."
