= Evergreen, Virginia =

Unincorporated community in Virginia, United States

Evergreen
- Unincorporated community
- Location within the state of Virginia Evergreen (the United States)
- Coordinates: 37°19′07″N 78°45′57″W
- Country: United States
- State: Virginia
- County: Appomattox
- Time zone: Eastern (EST)
  - Summer (DST): EDT
- ZIP codes: 23939, 24522
- GNIS feature ID: 1466358

Evergreen is an unincorporated community in Appomattox County, Virginia, United States, located off of U.S. Route 460. The village is home to approximately 300 people. Currently the Post Office is the only operating business, but there have been two general stores operating in the past including the well-known Hamilton's Store. There are two Protestant churches in the immediate area, Evergreen Baptist Church and Evergreen United Methodist Church. The Evergreen Ruritan Club is also an important part of the community, holding numerous events annually.

This town was a stop on the Southside Railroad in the mid-nineteenth century. This became the Atlantic, Mississippi and Ohio Railroad in 1870 and then a line in the Norfolk and Western Railway and now the Norfolk Southern Railway.

== 2016 tornado ==
On February 23, the Storm Prediction Center issued a moderate risk for severe weather across parts of Louisiana, Mississippi, Alabama, Georgia, and the Florida Panhandle, including a 15% risk area for tornadoes. The outbreak continued the following day as the Storm Prediction center issued another moderate risk across parts of the East Coast, again including a 15% risk area for tornadoes. Strong tornadoes impacted the East Coast states of Virginia, Pennsylvania, and North Carolina on February 24. This large stovepipe tornado initially caused minor tree and outbuilding damage before reaching EF2 strength near Chap, where a building sustained collapse of its brick facade, a frail home lost its roof and exterior walls, and a manufactured home sustained minor damage. Further to the northeast, a poorly constructed home was destroyed while other nearby homes sustained minor damage. The tornado then strengthened further as it struck Evergreen, where one small home was leveled at EF3 strength and other surrounding homes and structures were heavily damaged. Some outbuildings and mobile/manufactured homes were obliterated as well. A house near Holliday Lake State Park had its roof torn off at EF2 strength before the tornado lifted. Over 100 homes were damaged or destroyed and many trees were snapped and uprooted along the path. This and the following EF3 event were the first February E/F3+ tornadoes registered in Virginia since 1950. One Evergreen resident was killed and seven others were injured.
