= Grole =

Multi-spouted wooden bowl with a small lid

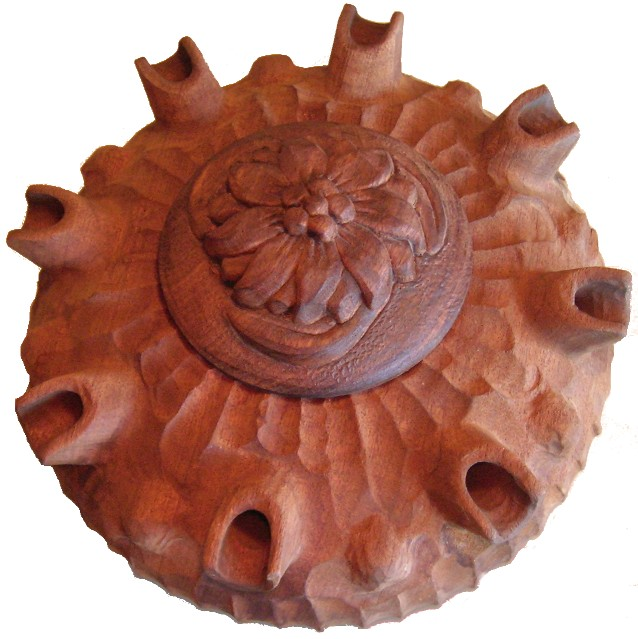
A grole with 8 spouts

A grole (/ɡroʊl/ GROHL; Arpitan: grola [ˈɡʁɔla]; French: grolle or grole [ɡʁɔl]; Italian: grolla [ˈɡrɔlla]) is a multi-spouted, and often ornately carved, wooden bowl with a small lid. Groles are always round and relatively shallow, with an interior capacity for liquid proportionate to the number of spouts. The bowl is local to the Savoy region of France and the adjacent Aosta Valley region in northwest Italy, and is usually available and enjoyed during après-ski or after dinner - especially one of fondue or raclette.

Traditionally, a grole is used to serve a hot drink (sometimes called café de l'amitié – i.e. "coffee of friendship"), comprising a base of black coffee to which are added a variety of liquors. The liquors added depend on whatever is on offer from the cafe or restaurant serving it. Sometimes several choices of liquor-combinations are available, sometimes only a single "house speciality".

This typically potent concoction is usually shared between 2 and 10 (or so) people, with the number of spouts on the grole matching the number of drinkers. Each person has his or her "own" assigned spout from which to drink, with each taking a mouthful before passing the bowl to the person next to them. It is important not to spill the hot liquid while drinking, which can be achieved by holding one's thumbs over the two adjacent holes in the grole before tipping it towards the mouth. The passing-on of the grole ends with the person who gets to take the last mouthful.

A typical recipe for a grole is, per person, a cup of coffee, a half cup of grappa, and 2 teaspoons of sugar. The coffee is poured first, then the liquor is slowly added as to not mix with the coffee. The alcohol is then inflamed using a spoon of sugar ignited with some liquor, adding a caramel flavor to the mixture. The very hot liquid is sipped one person at a time, thus alcohol vapors are inhaled in the process.
