= Appomattox County, Virginia =

County in Virginia, United States

- County
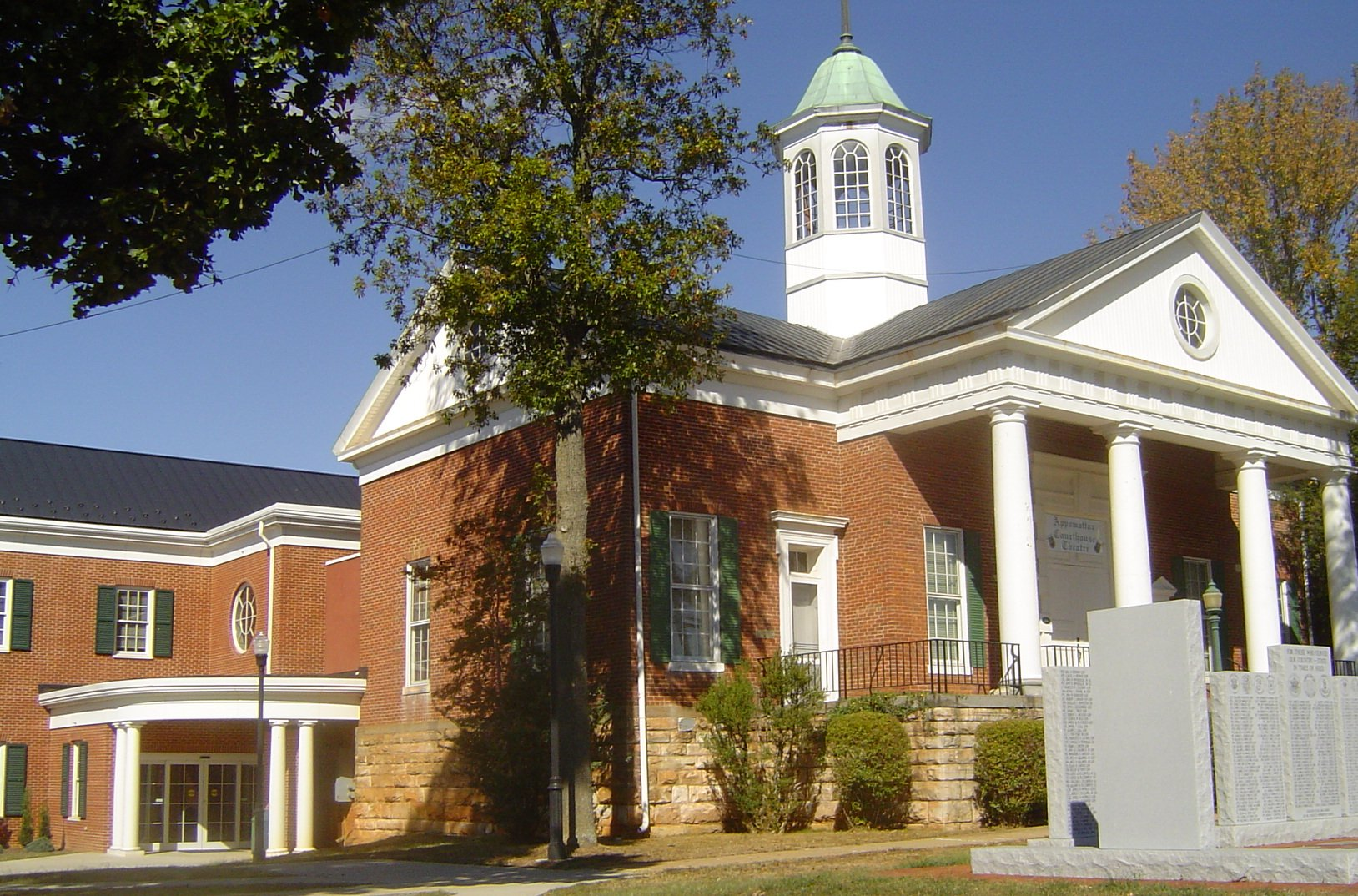
- The Appomattox County Courthouse in October 2007

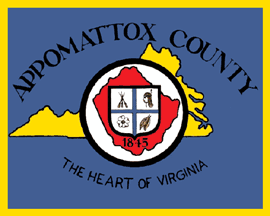
- Flag

- Location within the U.S. state of Virginia
- Coordinates: 37°21′32″N 78°49′35″W
- Country: United States
- State: Virginia
- Founded: 1845
- Named for: Appomattox River
- Seat: Appomattox
- Largest town: Appomattox

Area
  - Total: 335 sq mi (870 km^{2})
  - Land: 333 sq mi (860 km^{2})
  - Water: 1.2 sq mi (3.1 km^{2}) 0.4%

Population (2020)
  - Total: 16,119
  - Estimate (2025): 17,172 ▲
  - Density: 48.4/sq mi (18.7/km^{2})
- Time zone: UTC−5 (Eastern)
  - Summer (DST): UTC−4 (EDT)
- Congressional district: 5th
- Website: www.appomattoxcountyva.gov

Appomattox County (/ˌæpəˈmætəks/ A-pə-MA-təks) is a United States county located in the Piedmont region and near the center of the Commonwealth of Virginia. The county is part of the Lynchburg metropolitan area, and its county seat is the town of Appomattox.

Appomattox County was created in 1845 from parts of four other Virginia counties. The name of the county comes from the Appamatuck Indians, who lived in the area. As of the 2020 census, the population was 16,119.

== History ==
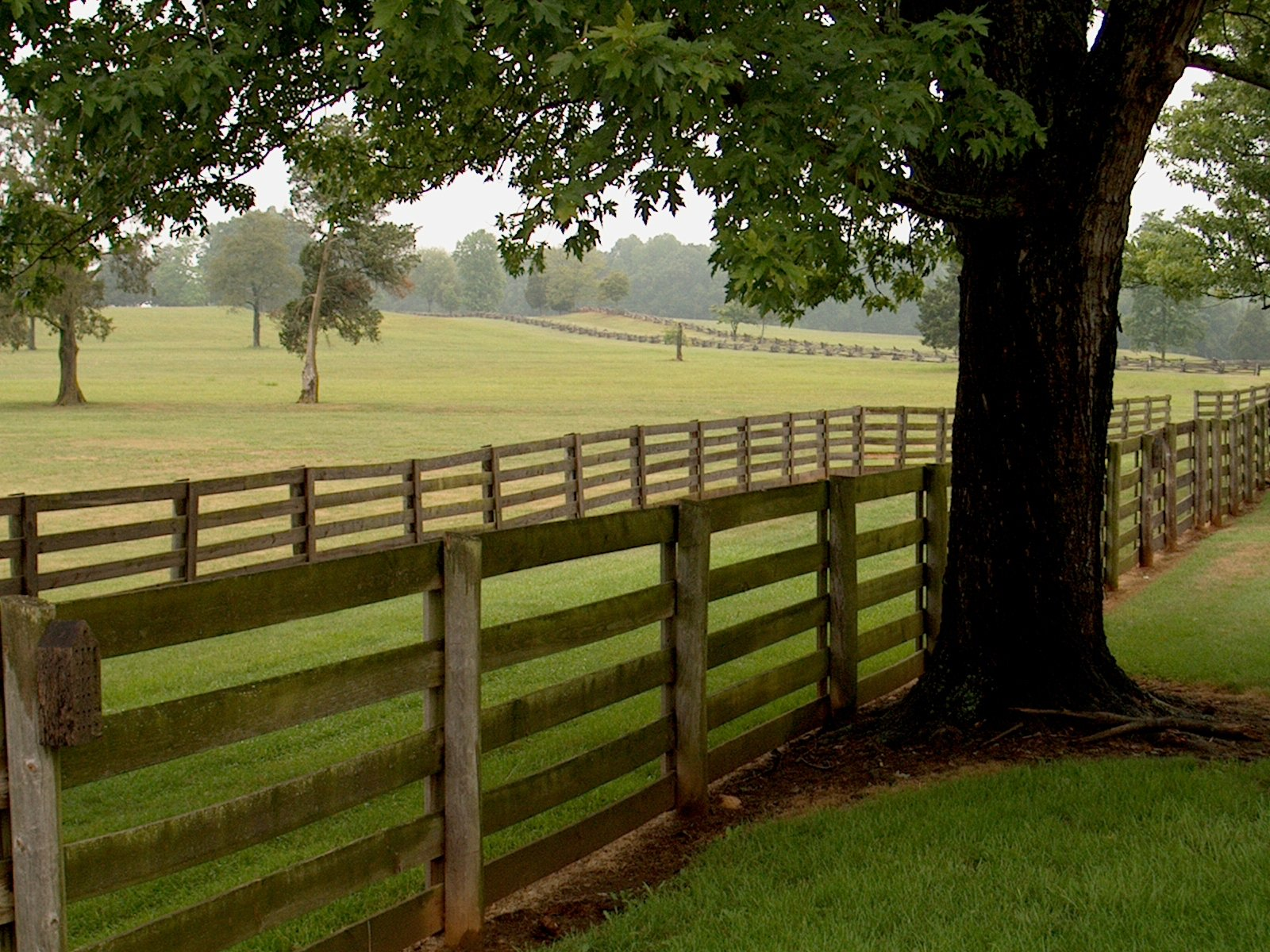
Appomattox County is located in the rolling hills of the piedmont region of Virginia.

Appomattox County was formed in 1845 from Buckingham, Prince Edward, Campbell, and Charlotte counties. In 1848, another part from Campbell County was added. It was named for the Appomattox River, which in turn was named for the Appamatuck, a historic Native American tribes in Virginia of the Algonquian-speaking Powhatan Confederacy.

Appomattox came to national attention on April 9, 1865, when Confederate General Robert E. Lee met with Union General Ulysses S. Grant at the village of Appomattox Court House to accept Lee's surrender. The surrender of Lee, which effectively ended the American Civil War, took place at the McLean House, home of Wilmer McLean.

== Geography ==
According to the U.S. Census Bureau, the county has a total area of 335 square miles (870 km^{2}), of which 333 square miles (860 km^{2}) is land and 1.2 square miles (3.1 km^{2}) (0.4%) is water.

=== Adjacent counties ===
- Nelson County - north
- Buckingham County - northeast
- Prince Edward County - southeast
- Charlotte County - south
- Campbell County - southwest
- Amherst County - northwest

=== National protected area ===
- Appomattox Court House National Historical Park

=== Major highways ===
- US 60
- US 460
- SR 24
- SR 26
- SR 47
- SR 131

== Demographics ==
Historical population
Census	Pop.	Note	%±
1850	9,193		—
1860	8,889		−3.3%
1870	8,950		0.7%
1880	10,080		12.6%
1890	9,589		−4.9%
1900	9,662		0.8%
1910	8,904		−7.8%
1920	9,255		3.9%
1930	8,402		−9.2%
1940	9,020		7.4%
1950	8,764		−2.8%
1960	9,148		4.4%
1970	9,784		7.0%
1980	11,971		22.4%
1990	12,298		2.7%
2000	13,705		11.4%
2010	14,973		9.3%
2020	16,119		7.7%
2025 (est.)	17,172	▲	6.5%
U.S. Decennial Census; 1790-1960 1900-1990; 1990-2000 2010 2020

=== Racial and ethnic composition ===
Appomattox County, Virginia – Racial and ethnic composition Note: the US Census treats Hispanic/Latino as an ethnic category. This table excludes Latinos from the racial categories and assigns them to a separate category. Hispanics/Latinos may be of any race.
Race / Ethnicity (NH = Non-Hispanic)	Pop 1980	Pop 1990	Pop 2000	Pop 2010	Pop 2020	% 1980	% 1990	% 2000	% 2010	% 2020
White alone (NH)	9,117	9,439	10,377	11,483	12,155	76.16%	76.75%	75.72%	76.69%	75.41%
Black or African American alone (NH)	2,753	2,810	3,132	2,998	2,877	23.00%	22.85%	22.85%	20.02%	17.85%
Native American or Alaska Native alone (NH)	10	11	17	28	50	0.08%	0.09%	0.12%	0.19%	0.31%
Asian alone (NH)	9	6	23	35	42	0.08%	0.05%	0.17%	0.23%	0.26%
Native Hawaiian or Pacific Islander alone (NH)	x	x	3	4	3	x	x	0.02%	0.03%	0.02%
Other race alone (NH)	6	2	18	23	84	0.05%	0.02%	0.13%	0.15%	0.52%
Mixed race or Multiracial (NH)	x	x	70	235	564	x	x	0.51%	1.57%	3.50%
Hispanic or Latino (any race)	76	30	65	167	344	0.63%	0.24%	0.47%	1.12%	2.13%
Total	11,971	12,298	13,705	14,973	16,119	100.00%	100.00%	100.00%	100.00%	100.00%

=== 2020 census ===
As of the 2020 census, the county had a population of 16,119. The median age was 42.6 years. 22.2% of residents were under the age of 18 and 20.8% of residents were 65 years of age or older. For every 100 females there were 93.0 males, and for every 100 females age 18 and over there were 91.8 males age 18 and over.

The racial makeup of the county was 76.0% White, 18.0% Black or African American, 0.3% American Indian and Alaska Native, 0.3% Asian, 0.0% Native Hawaiian and Pacific Islander, 1.1% from some other race, and 4.3% from two or more races. Hispanic or Latino residents of any race comprised 2.1% of the population.

0.0% of residents lived in urban areas, while 100.0% lived in rural areas.

There were 6,470 households in the county, of which 29.2% had children under the age of 18 living with them and 25.5% had a female householder with no spouse or partner present. About 26.0% of all households were made up of individuals and 12.6% had someone living alone who was 65 years of age or older.

There were 7,301 housing units, of which 11.4% were vacant. Among occupied housing units, 78.1% were owner-occupied and 21.9% were renter-occupied. The homeowner vacancy rate was 1.9% and the rental vacancy rate was 8.1%.

=== 2000 Census ===
As of the census of 2000, there were 13,705 people, 5,322 households, and 4,012 families residing in the county. The population density was 41 people per square mile (16 people/km^{2}). There were 5,828 housing units at an average density of 18 units per square mile (6.9 units/km^{2}). The racial makeup of the county was 75.94% White, 22.91% Black or African American, 0.13% Native American, 0.17% Asian, 0.02% Pacific Islander, 0.26% from other races, and 0.56% from two or more races. 0.47% of the population were Hispanic or Latino of any race.

There were 5,322 households, out of which 32.20% had children under the age of 18 living with them, 59.70% were married couples living together, 11.50% had a female householder with no husband present, and 24.60% were non-families. 21.30% of all households were made up of individuals, and 10.00% had someone living alone who was 65 years of age or older. The average household size was 2.55 and the average family size was 2.94.

In the county, the population was spread out, with 24.70% under the age of 18, 7.10% from 18 to 24, 27.80% from 25 to 44, 25.60% from 45 to 64, and 14.80% who were 65 years of age or older. The median age was 39 years. For every 100 females there were 94.80 males. For every 100 females aged 18 and over, there were 91.10 males.

The median income for a household in the county was $36,507, and the median income for a family was $41,563. Males had a median income of $31,428 versus $21,367 for females. The per capita income for the county was $18,086. 11.40% of the population and 8.70% of families were below the poverty line. Out of the total population, 14.10% of those under the age of 18 and 21.50% of those 65 and older were living below the poverty line.

== Government ==
Appomattox County was historically strongly Democratic, as part of the Solid South. It has been consistently won by Republicans since 1964.

=== Board of Supervisors ===
- Appomattox River district: Ken Wolfskill (R)
- Courthouse district: Samuel E. Carter (I)
- Falling River district: John F. Hinkle, Chairman (R)
- Piney Mountain district: Alfred L. Jones III, Vice-Chairman (I)
- Wreck Island district: Trevor L. Hipps (R)

=== Constitutional officers ===
- Clerk of the Circuit Court: Janet A. Hix (I)
- Commissioner of the Revenue: Sara R. Henderson (I)
- Commonwealth's Attorney: Leslie M. Fleet (I)
- Sheriff: Robert Richardson (I)
- Treasurer: Victoria C. Phelps (I)

Appomattox County is represented by Republican Luther Cifers in the Virginia Senate, Republican Lee Ware in the Virginia House of Delegates, and Republican John McGuire in the U.S. House of Representatives.

United States presidential election results for Appomattox County, Virginia
Year	Republican		Democratic		Third party(ies)	
Year	No.	%	No.	%	No.	%
1912	28	3.81%	654	89.10%	52	7.08%
1916	133	15.91%	700	83.73%	3	0.36%
1920	190	18.41%	837	81.10%	5	0.48%
1924	101	9.41%	952	88.72%	20	1.86%
1928	446	33.51%	885	66.49%	0	0.00%
1932	204	15.26%	1,123	83.99%	10	0.75%
1936	204	12.85%	1,375	86.64%	8	0.50%
1940	215	15.77%	1,144	83.93%	4	0.29%
1944	270	19.49%	1,109	80.07%	6	0.43%
1948	238	14.29%	1,182	70.95%	246	14.77%
1952	929	49.13%	957	50.61%	5	0.26%
1956	853	40.89%	1,079	51.73%	154	7.38%
1960	951	43.07%	1,240	56.16%	17	0.77%
1964	2,444	64.47%	1,339	35.32%	8	0.21%
1968	1,753	43.42%	756	18.73%	1,528	37.85%
1972	2,788	78.20%	684	19.19%	93	2.61%
1976	1,964	50.84%	1,702	44.06%	197	5.10%
1980	2,548	60.42%	1,492	35.38%	177	4.20%
1984	3,386	68.65%	1,498	30.37%	48	0.97%
1988	3,205	63.59%	1,740	34.52%	95	1.88%
1992	2,830	50.36%	1,919	34.15%	871	15.50%
1996	2,625	47.93%	2,239	40.88%	613	11.19%
2000	3,654	61.65%	2,132	35.97%	141	2.38%
2004	4,366	65.60%	2,191	32.92%	98	1.47%
2008	4,903	64.26%	2,641	34.61%	86	1.13%
2012	5,340	67.30%	2,453	30.91%	142	1.79%
2016	5,715	71.34%	2,023	25.25%	273	3.41%
2020	6,702	72.31%	2,418	26.09%	148	1.60%
2024	7,243	74.79%	2,324	24.00%	118	1.22%

== Communities ==
=== Towns ===
- Appomattox
- Pamplin City

=== Census-designated place ===
- Concord (primarily in Campbell County)

=== Other unincorporated communities ===
- Beckham
- Bent Creek
- Bowler
- Chap
- Evergreen
- Fore Store
- Hixburg
- Promise Land
- Spout Spring
- Spring Mills
- Stonewall
- Vera

== See also ==
- National Register of Historic Places listings in Appomattox County, Virginia
