= Virginia State Route 131 =

State highway in Appomattox County, Virginia, US

State Route 131

Route information
- Maintained by VDOT
- Length: 1.65 mi (2.66 km)
- Existed: 1933–present

Major junctions
- South end: US 460 Bus. / SR 631 in Appomattox
- North end: US 460 / SR 24 in Appomattox

Location
- Country: United States
- State: Virginia
- Counties: Appomattox

Highway system
- Virginia Routes; Interstate; US; Primary; Secondary; Byways; History; HOT lanes
← SR 130	→ SR 132

State Route 131 (SR 131) is a primary state highway in the U.S. state of Virginia. The state highway runs 1.65 miles (2.66 km) from U.S. Route 460 Business (US 460 Business) north to US 460 and SR 24 within Appomattox. SR 131 serves the Appomattox Historic District, which includes the downtown area of the town of Appomattox.

== Route description ==
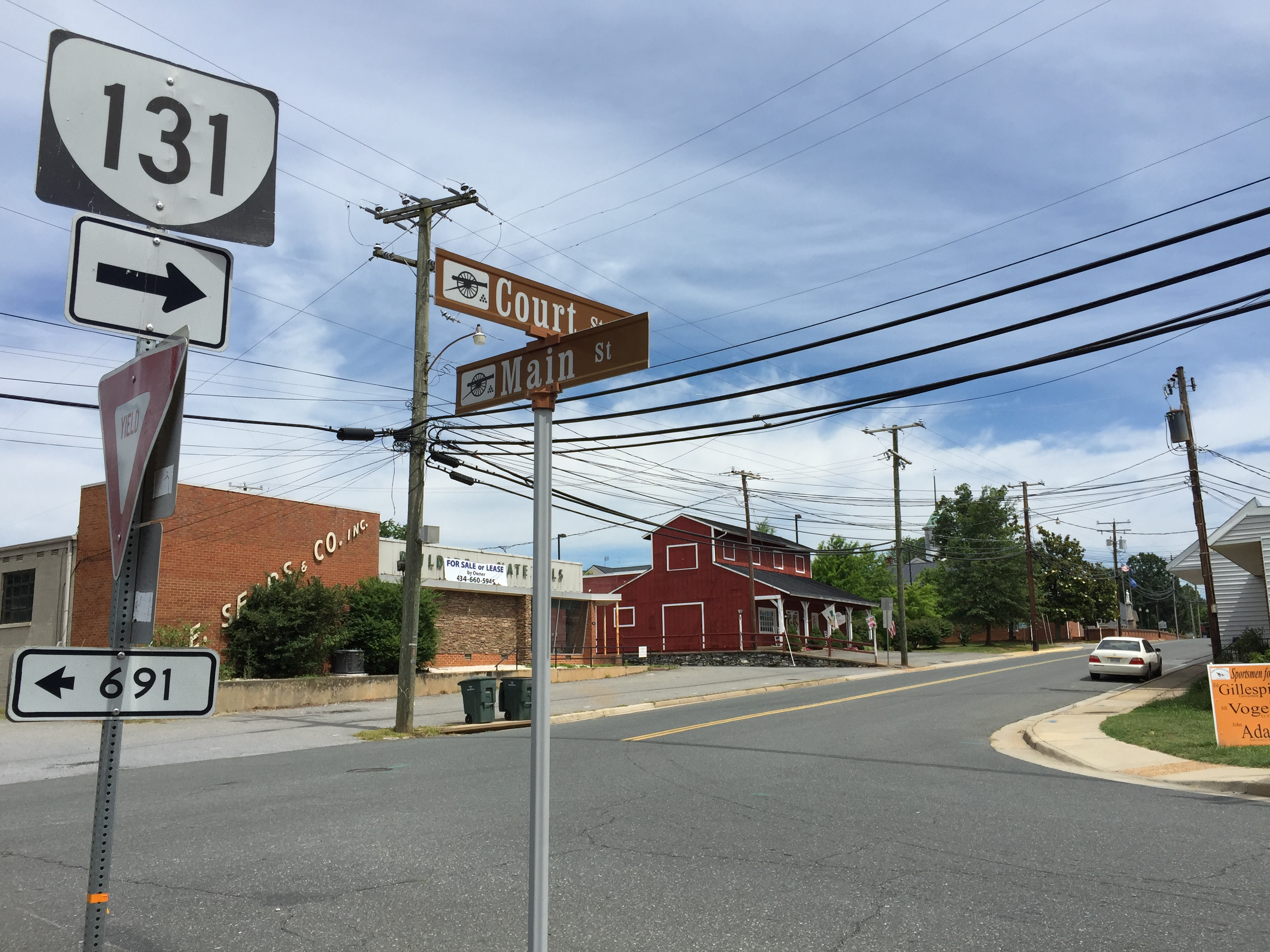
View north along SR 131 in downtown Appomattox

SR 131 begins at US 460 Business (Confederate Boulevard) on the east side of the town of Appomattox. The state highway heads west along Oakleigh Avenue to the edge of the downtown area, where the highway turns south onto Church Street. Before reaching the railroad tracks, which are part of Norfolk Southern Railway's Blue Ridge District, SR 131 heads onto Main Street, which is one-way toward the east. Traffic heading west must use Harrell Street to Lee Street to the west end of Main Street's one-way section. After one block on the two-way section of Main Street, SR 131 turns north onto Court Street, which serves the Appomattox County offices. At the northern end of Court Street, SR 131 briefly runs concurrently with US 460 Business (Confederate Boulevard) before turning northeast onto Old Courthouse Road. The state highway widens to a four-lane divided highway shortly before its northern terminus at US 460 (Richmond Highway), the freeway bypass of Appomattox. SR 24 also heads west from the diamond interchange along the bypass toward Concord and northeast along the continuation of Old Courthouse Road toward Appomattox Court House National Historical Park and US 60.

== Major intersections ==
The entire route is in Appomattox, Appomattox County.

mi	km	Destinations	Notes
0.00	0.00	US 460 Bus. (Confederate Boulevard) / SR 631 north (Oakleigh Avenue)	Southern terminus
		SR 727 north (Church Street)	former SR 26 north
		SR 727 south (Church Street)	former SR 26 south; south end of one-way southbound section
		SR 1059 (Lee Street)	north end of one-way southbound section
1.06	1.71	US 460 Bus. east (Confederate Boulevard) / SR 1012 (Jones Street) – Farmville	South end of concurrency with US 460 Business
1.13	1.82	US 460 Bus. west (Oakville Road) / SR F1016 (Founders Lane) – Lynchburg	North end of concurrency with US 460 Business
1.65	2.66	US 460 / SR 24 (Old Courthouse Road) to US 60 – Lynchburg, Farmville, Appomattox Court House National Historical Park	Diamond interchange; northern terminus
1.000 mi = 1.609 km; 1.000 km = 0.621 mi: Concurrency terminus

< SR 308	District 3 State Routes; 1928–1933	SR 310 >
