= Special routes of U.S. Route 460 =

Special routes of U.S. Route 460

Highway system
- United States Numbered Highway System; List; Special; Divided

A total of at least sixteen special routes of U.S. Route 460 exist and at least six have been deleted.

== Kentucky ==
=== Georgetown bypass route ===
U.S. Route 460 Bypass
- Location: Georgetown, Kentucky
- Length: 4.390 mi (7.065 km)

U.S. Route 460 Bypass (US 460 Byp.) is a bypass route in Georgetown, Kentucky. It serves as the main part of the Georgetown Bypass. The majority of its route is shared with US 62; the other part of the bypass is KY 1143. It begins across from the Canewood Golf Course and runs southeasterly where it intersects and merges with US 62. Just after sharply curving slightly to the northeast US 62/US 460 Byp. has an intersection with US 25, then begins to curve more toward the north around the vicinity of a pair of bridges over a railroad line. US 460 Byp. ends at US 460 two blocks west of exit 125 on I-75, while US 62 continues northward toward Columbus, Ohio.

Major intersections

The entire route is in Georgetown, Scott County.

mi	km	Destinations	Notes
0.000	0.000	US 460 (Frankfort Pike); KY 1143 (McClelland Circle)	Western terminus
1.026	1.651	US 62 west (Paynes Depot Road) to I-64	Western end of US 62 concurrency
1.750	2.816	US 25 (Lexington Road)	
3.491	5.618	KY 1962 (Lemons Mill Road)	
4.390	7.065	US 460 (Paris Pike) to I-75 south US 62 east (Cherry Blossom Way) to I-75	Eastern terminus; eastern end of US 62 concurrency
1.000 mi = 1.609 km; 1.000 km = 0.621 mi: Concurrency terminus

=== Paintsville business loop ===
U.S. Route 460 Business
- Location: Paintsville-Prestonburg, Kentucky

U.S. Route 460 Business (US 460 Business) was a business route in Paintsville, Kentucky, and Prestonburg, Kentucky. Much of the route ran in a concurrency with U.S. Route 23 Business, as well as Kentucky Route 40, Kentucky Route 321, and Kentucky Route 114.

=== Pikeville business loop ===
U.S. Route 460 Business
- Location: Pikeville, Kentucky

U.S. Route 460 Business (US 460 Business) was a business route of Pikeville, Kentucky. Like the business route between Paintsville and Prestonburg, it ran in concurrency with U.S. Route 23 Business. The route began at a diamond interchange shared by the eastern terminus of KY 1384 and ran east where it eventually curved south and west around into downtown Pikeville. US BUS 23/460 ended at a semi-directional T interchange with US 23/460.

== Virginia ==
=== Grundy business loop ===
U.S. Route 460 Business
- Location: Grundy, Virginia

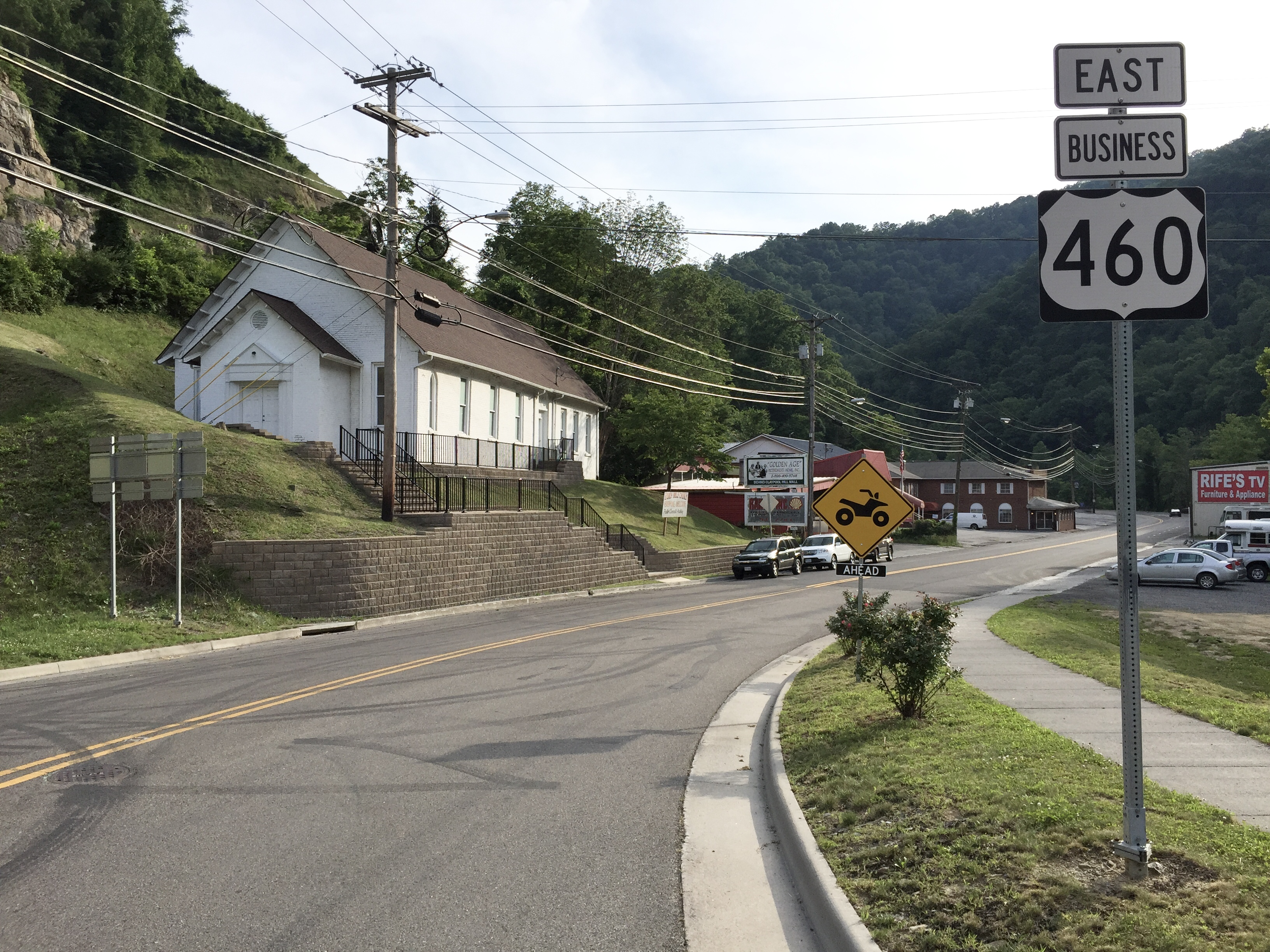
US 460 Bus. east of US 460 in Grundy

U.S. Route 460 Business (US 460 Business) is a business route of US 460 through Grundy, Virginia.

=== Richlands–Cedar Bluff business loop ===
U.S. Route 460 Business
- Location: Richlands–Cedar Bluff, Virginia

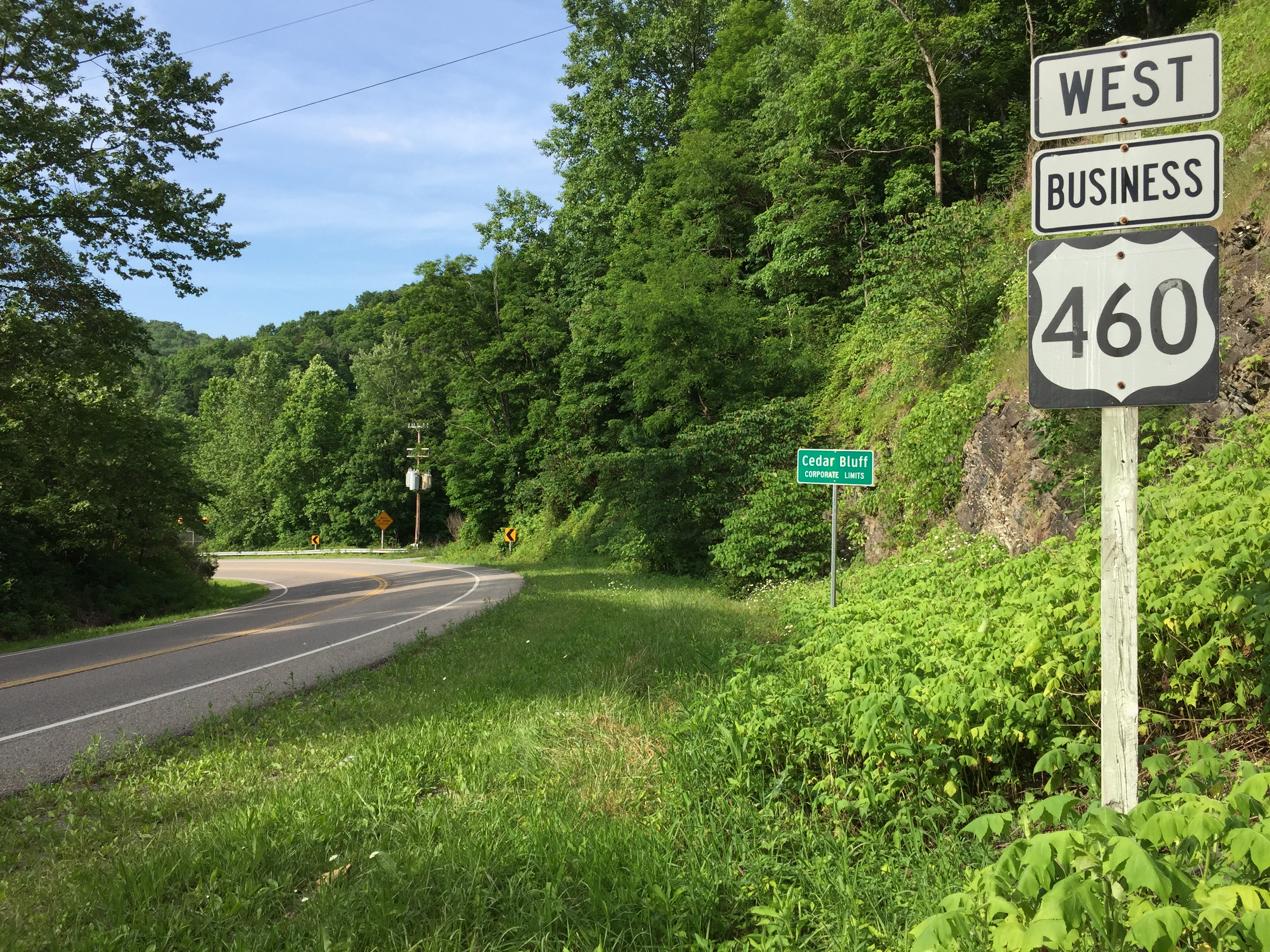
View west along US 460 Bus. entering Cedar Bluff west of US 460

U.S. Route 460 Business (US 460 Business) is a business route of Richlands and Cedar Bluff, Virginia. The road begins as Front Street at an at-grade interchange with US 460 west of downtown Richlands, taking a concurrency with State Route 67 away from that route and immediately crosses a bridge over the Clinch River while running parallel to a Norfolk and Western Railroad line. The route splits into a one-way pair at Second Avenue, and the concurrency with SR 67 goes along with the split. Eastbound US BUS 460/SR 67 now runs along Front Street, while westbound US BUS 460/SR 67 runs along Second Street. The railroad tracks move away from Front Street west of the SR 609 (Veterans Drive) bridge. SR 609 only terminates at the westbound section of the route. The routes cross over the Clinch River a second time in both directions after this.

Across the street from a wye junction with the previously mentioned railroad line, SR 67 turns north onto Railroad Avenue. The one-way split of US BUS 460 ends east of Grayson Avenue, and the first intersection after this split is the shared intersection with Dickerson Place and Teah Park Street. The business route resumes running parallel to the N&W line, which itself now follows that Clinch River. Front Street rises above the tracks along a mountain, then curves towards the south. A local street branches off to the south as the railroad line and river follow that street instead, while US BUS 460 briefly curves back to the east. Near Richlands High School, the road turns southeast once again, descending gradually down a hill as it approaches its parent route. US BUS 460 ends at an unconventional quarter-cloverleaf interchange with US 460 at the Richland-Cedar Bluff border, which is also shared with the western terminus of SR 631 (Cedar Valley Drive).

=== Tazewell business loop ===
U.S. Route 460 Business
- Location: Tazewell, Virginia
- Existed: 1974–present
- Tourist routes: Virginia Byway

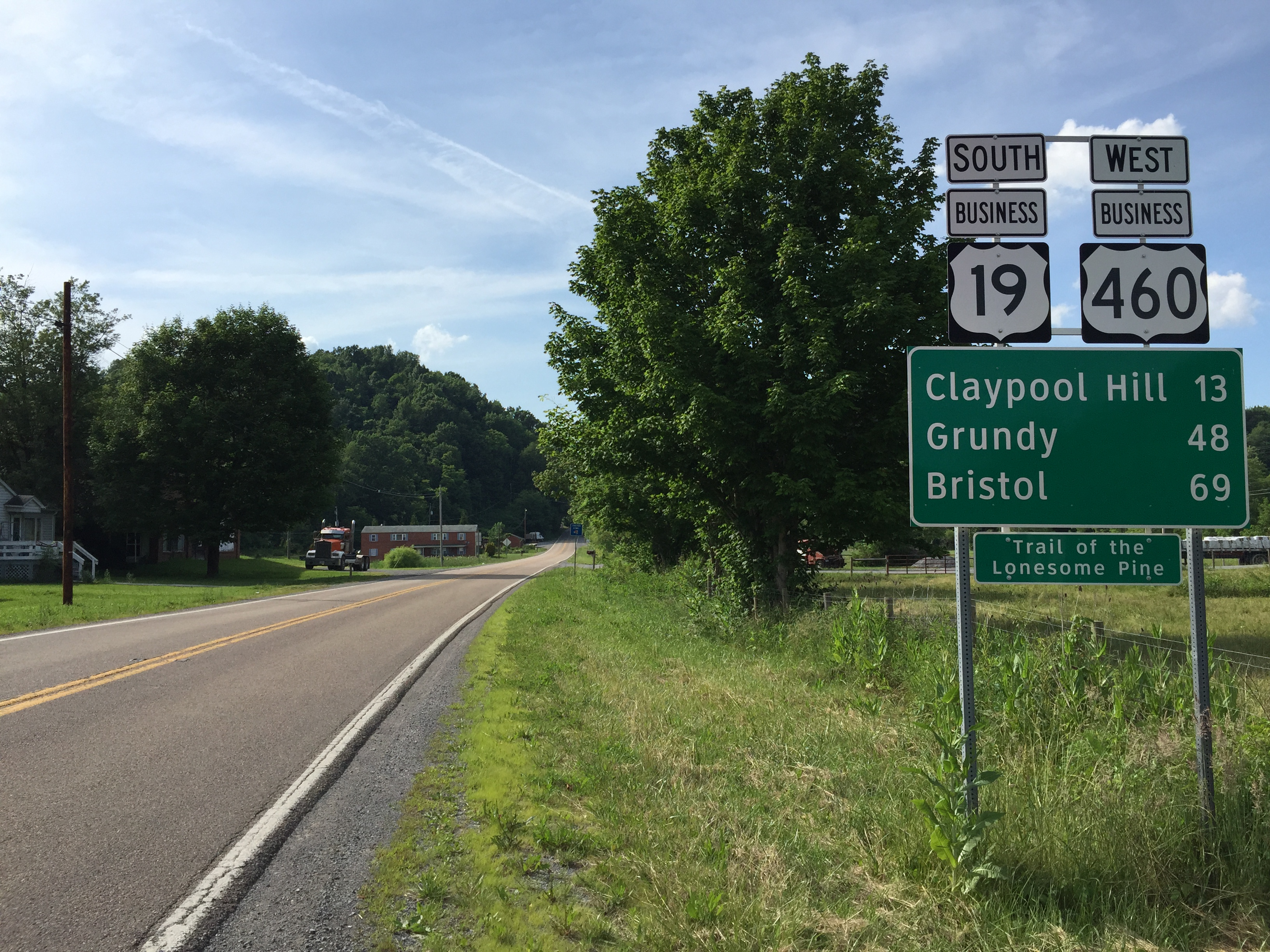
View south along US 19 Bus. and west along US 460 Bus. at SR 91 in Frog Level

U.S. Route 460 Business (US 460 Business) is an 8-mile-long (13 km) business route of US 460 in Tazewell, Virginia. It is concurrent with US 19 Business for its entire length.

The route begins at an at-grade intersection near the Historic Crab Orchard Museum, running southeast. The road makes a sharp curve to the east at the wye intersection of the northern terminus of State Route 91, and then joins a concurrency with State Route 16. The road doesn't enter "downtown" Tazewell until another wye with State Route 16 Alternate (Fairground Road), where the name is changed to West Main Street. West Fincastle Turnpike, which ran parallel to the north side of the road since SR ALT 16 merges with US BUS 19/460/SR 16 at the beginning of an undetermined historic district. Only at Central Avenue does the name change from West Main Street to East Man Street, where it skirts the southern edge of the Tazewell Historic District. East Main Street ends at Church Avenue and US BUS 19/460 turns south onto Church Avenue, only to make a sharp curve back to the northeast onto a road named the Fincastle Turnpike. It curves more toward the east before the concurrency with SR 16 ends at a low-key signalized intersection.

Later the turnpike passes the Tazewell High School and some gas stations mixed in with primarily a residential area, which becomes more commercial east of Perry Street. The road curves northeast as it intersects Ben Bolt Road, and later crosses a bridge over the South Fork of the Clinch River thus entering an eastern sliver of North Tazewell where it encounters a diagonal intersection with State Route 61. Only after this intersection does the road run parallel to the North Fork of the Clinch River and a former Norfolk and Western Railroad line. Briefly curving to the right, it uses a low bridge over that river which now runs along the south and east side of the road (sometimes even at the shoulder of the road), while the railroad line remains along the north and west side of it. The road ends at an eastbound on-westbound off flyunder interchange with US 19/460.

=== Pearisburg business loop ===
U.S. Route 460 Business
- Location: Pearisburg, Virginia

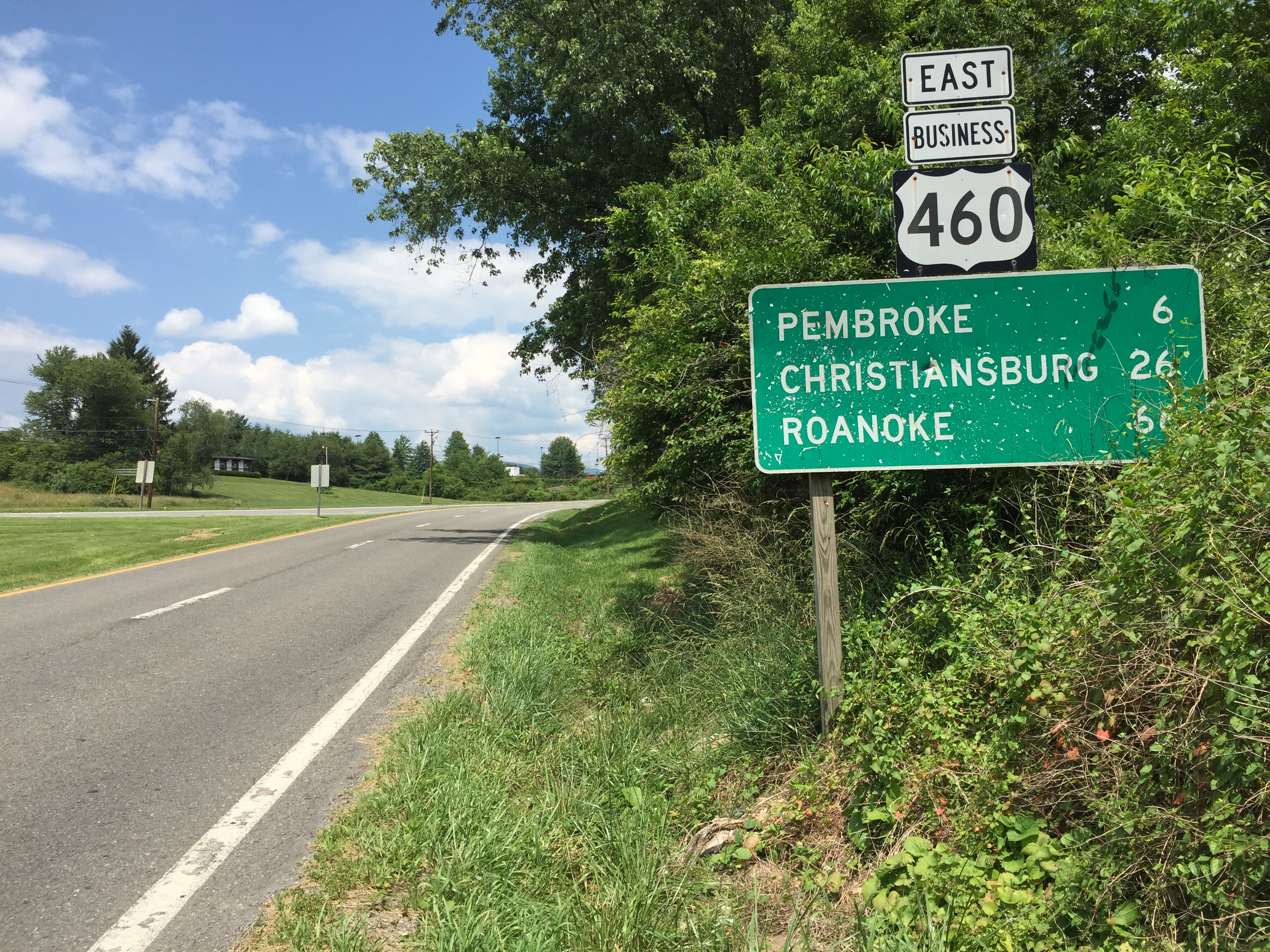
View east along US 460 Bus. in Pearisburg

U.S. Route 460 Business (US 460 Bus.) is a 4-mile-long (6.4 km) business route of US 460 through Pearisburg. The route begins at a trumpet interchange north of the town center, where it is known as North Main Street. Shortly afterwards, the route joins with SR 100, then heads into downtown. At the corner of the Giles County Courthouse, the route turns left onto Wenonah Avenue, and the concurrency with SR 100 ends. The route travels east out of downtown, then reaches US 460 at a standard off-ramp after passing the Giles High School.

=== Blacksburg–Christiansburg business loop ===
U.S. Route 460 Business
- Location: Blacksburg–Christiansburg, Virginia
- Existed: 1968–present

U.S. Route 460 Business (US 460 Business) is a business route of Blacksburg and Christiansburg, Virginia, 6 miles (9.7 km) of which can be found in Blacksburg and 4 miles (6.4 km) of which can be found in Christiansburg.

After US 460 curves to the south, US BUS 460 branches off to the southeast between Bishop Road (SR 648) and Farmingdale Lane, and is named North Main Street. Within downtown Blacksburg, it encounters a traffic circle at the end of SR 412. From there, the road encounters the Virginia Tech Alumni Mall (SR 314). At the four corners of Blacksburg, North Main Street becomes South Main Street at Roanoke Street which changes from West Main Street to East Main Street. Eventually it curves straight south as it passes by the runway of the Virginia Tech Montgomery Executive Airport. US BUS 460 has an interchange with its parent route but does not terminate there. This interchange contains unbuilt ramps leading to and from Transportation Research Drive, the home of the Virginia Tech Transportation Institute. The former right-of-way of the parent route and business route can be found on the southwest corner of the interchange. After the intersection of SRs 808/643, the route passes by the Lewis-Gale Hospital-Montgomery, which is flanked to the south and west by SR 775.

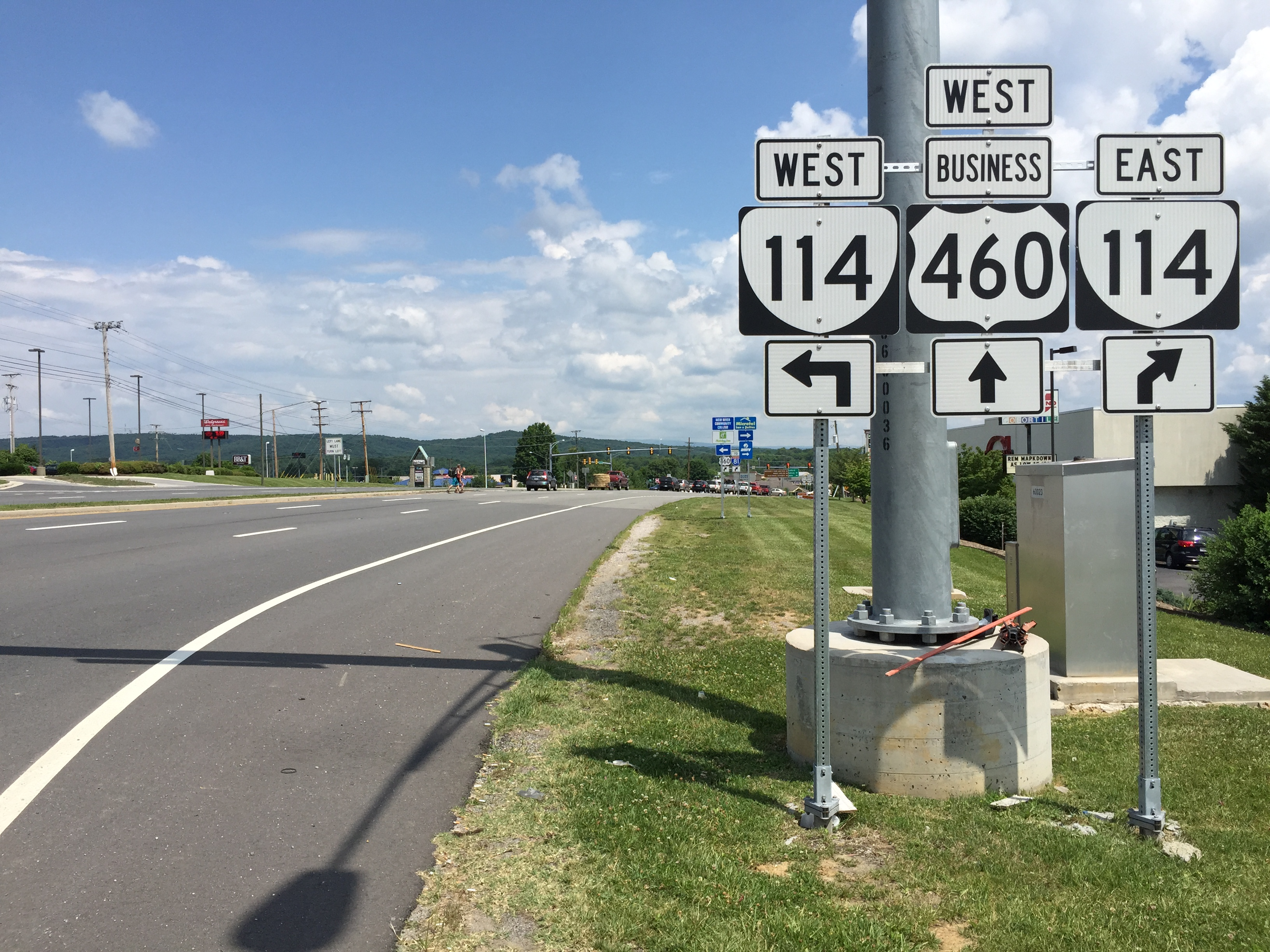
View west along US 460 Bus. just east of SR 114 in Christiansburg

Just north of SR 657 the route enters Christiansburg and becomes North Franklin Street. One noteworthy site along the way is the large Corning Glass Factory in the distance along the west side. Around the same area, the road is three blocks west of the parent route. The road runs southwest until it runs past the New River Valley Mall on the northwest corner of the intersection with State Route 114, and then curves back to the southeast, where it approaches a second interchange with US 460 only to be diverted to the south once again. Technically, this interchange is where the Blacksburg business route ends and the Christiansburg business route begins. It includes a trumpet interchange between the Blacksburg and Christiansburg business routes, and wye interchanges with the parent route for both. Additionally, the southbound ramp between the Blacksburg and Christiansburg Business Routes contains an off-ramp to Cambria Street (State Route 111), but all segments encounter railroad crossings before intersecting SR 111 itself.

From there the road climbs a hill, then descends as it passes a historical marker for the Christiansburg Industrial Institute next to an Appalachian Power substation before crossing the bridge over Crab Creek, which also runs over a two-tracked Norfolk and Western Railway line that pass by the nearby Cambria Freight Station. In the heart of Downtown Christiansburg, US BUS 460 makes a left turn onto a concurrency with US 11 at East Main Street, and both routes make a sharp turn to the right onto Roanoke Street, which becomes Lee Highway east of First Street Southeast Lee Highway crosses another railroad line, this time at an at-grade level crossing before encountering the southern terminus of SR 111 this time as Depot Street Northeast. Just after the Gateway Plaza North shopping center, US Bus 460 encounters a third interchange with US 460, but finally ends at an interchange with I-81 (Exit 118) where US 460 itself takes over the concurrency with US 11 along Lee Highway.

=== Salem alternate route ===
U.S. Route 460 Alternate
- Location: Salem, Virginia
- Existed: 1946–present

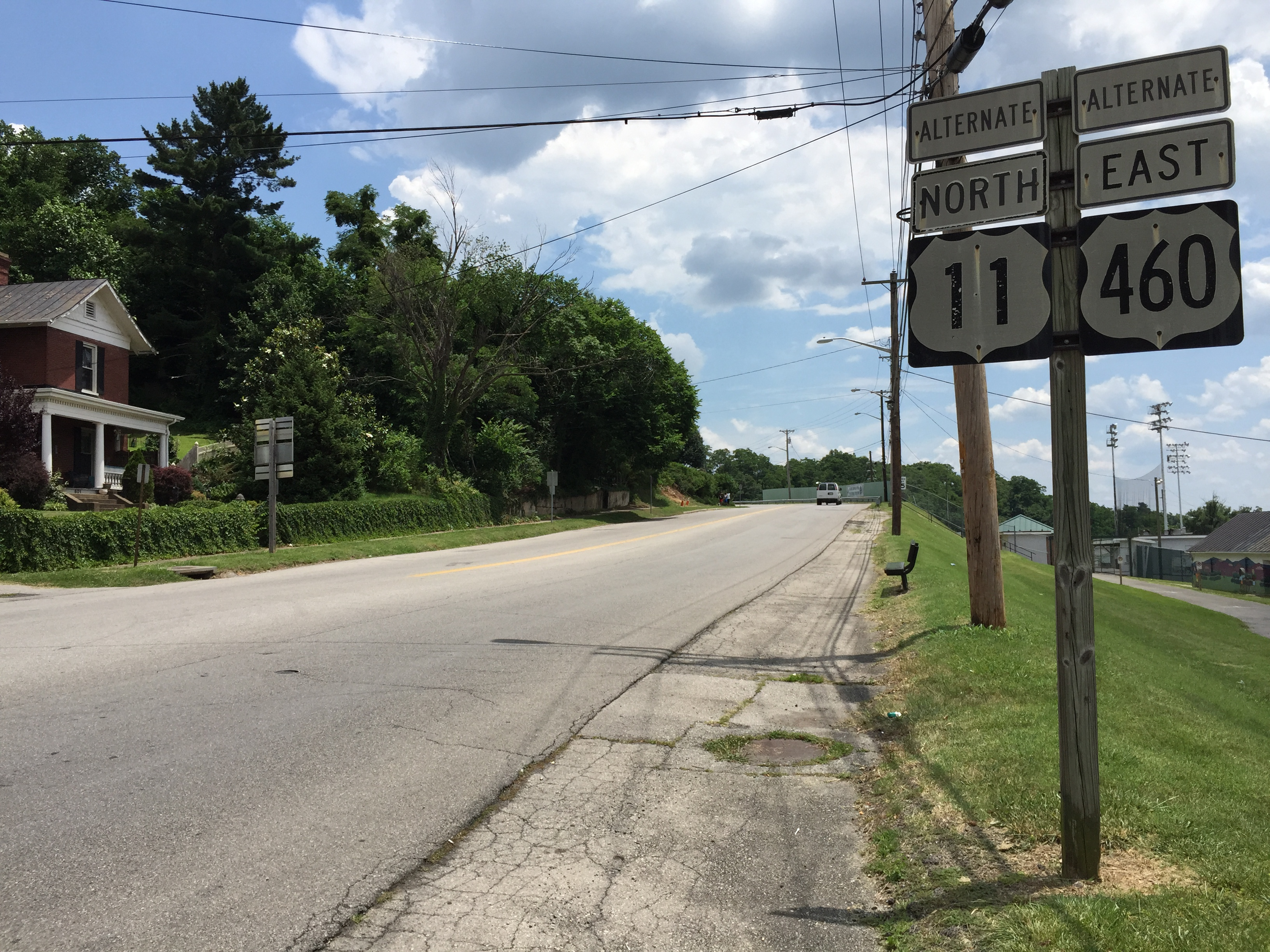
View north along US 11 Alt. and east along US 460 Alt. in Salem

U.S. Route 460 Alternate (US 460 Alternate) is a 3-mile-long (4.8 km) alternate route in Salem, Virginia. It is concurrent with US 11 Alternate for its entire length. Beyond the eastern terminus, the US 11 Alternate continues along main line US 460 into Roanoke, Virginia.

=== Bedford business loop ===
U.S. Route 460 Business
- Location: Bedford, Virginia
- Existed: 1971–present

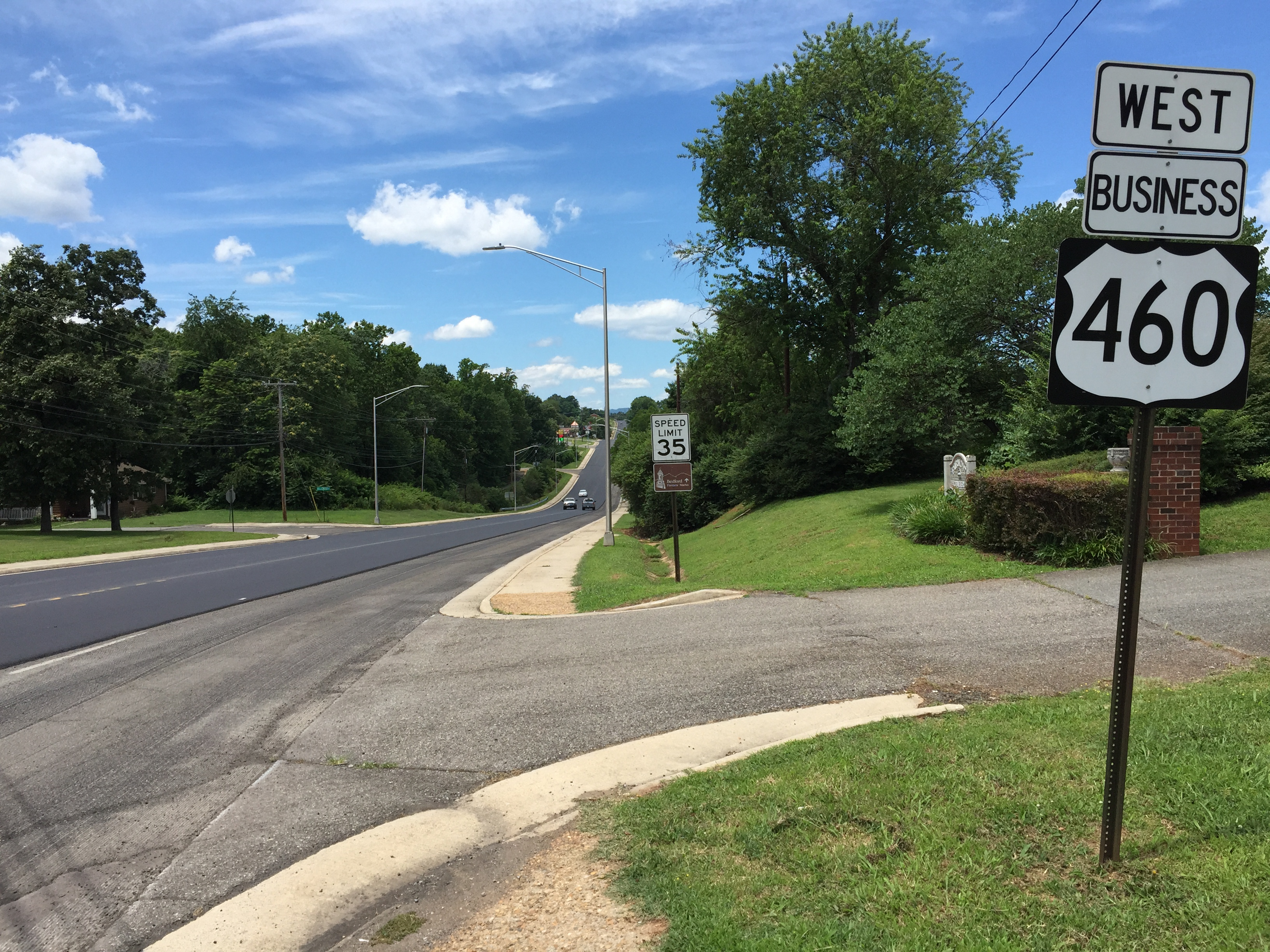
US 460 Bus. westbound at SR 122 in Bedford

U.S. Route 460 Business (US 460 Business) is a 3-mile-long (4.8 km) business route of Bedford, Virginia. The route runs in a concurrency with US 221, as well as a brief one with State Route 43.

=== Timberlake–Lynchburg business loop ===
U.S. Route 460 Business
- Location: Timberlake-Lynchburg, Virginia
- Existed: 1977–present

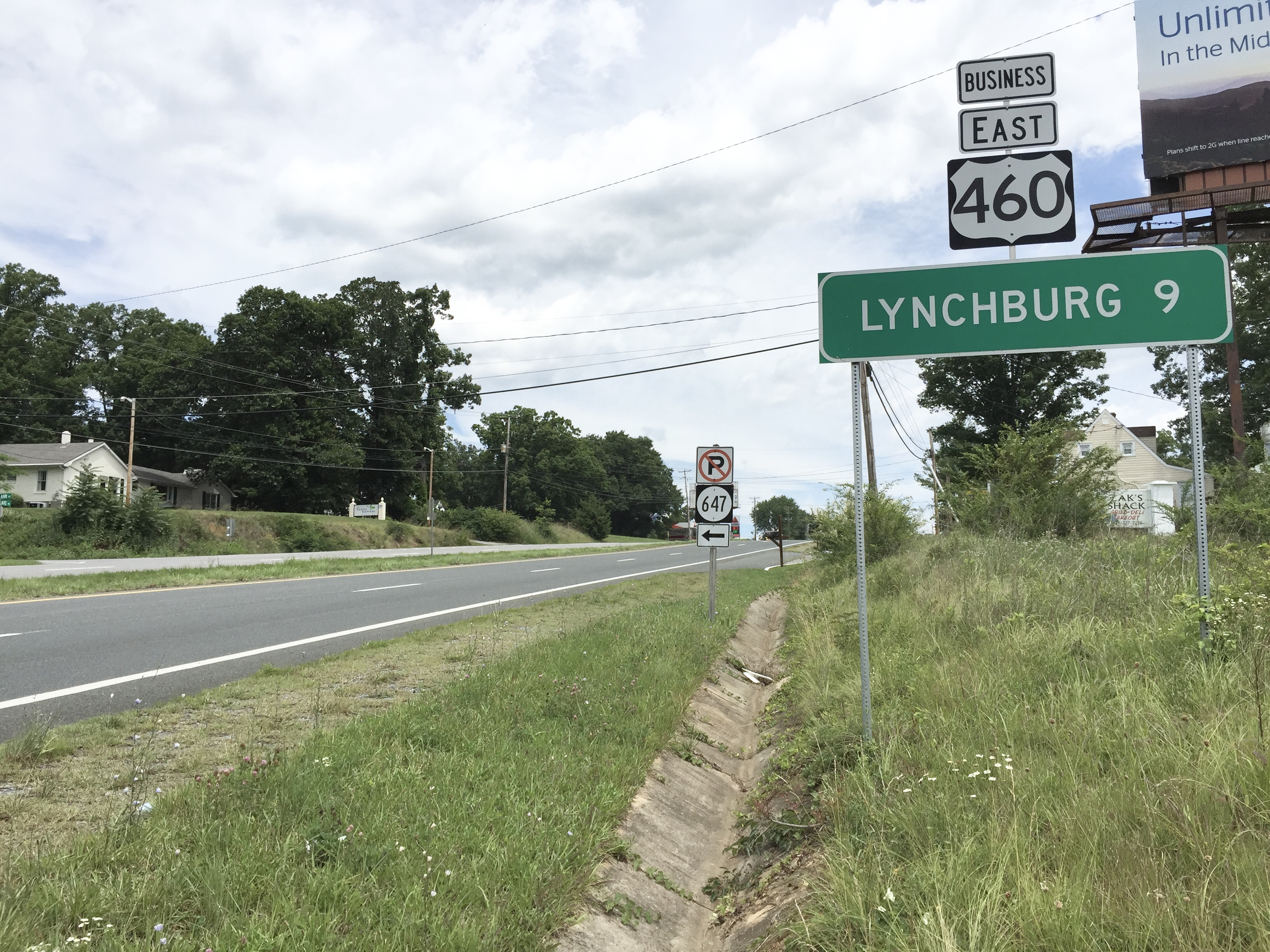
US 460 Bus. eastbound at SR 647 in Timberlake

U.S. Route 460 Business (US 460 Business) is a 13-mile-long (21 km) business route of Lynchburg, Virginia. The route begins in Timberlake at a trumpet interchange with US 460 east of the intersection with SR 681, and runs northeast as a four-lane divided highway known as Timberlake Road. It remains in Timberlake until the intersection with Crowell Lane where it enters the Lynchburg City Limits, maintaining the same characteristics as a commercial strip that it had in Timberlake. After the interchange with US 501, the road becomes Fort Avenue. East of John Lynch Place, Fort Avenue becomes a four-lane undivided highway until it passes Westview Avenue and divides again before seeming to terminate at State Route 163. US BUS 460/SR 163 runs in a northeast concurrency as a four-lane undivided highway until it reaches the Fort Early and Jubal Early Monument, where SR 163 diverges north as two-lane Memorial Avenue at an acute intersection, and US BUS 460 becomes a two-lane highway as well. Access from southbound SR 163 to eastbound US 460 Business and from westbound US 460 Business to northbound SR 163 is provided through Oakridge Boulevard.

At Wythe Road, US BUS 460 is joined by US 221, just east of Calvin Falwell Field. US 221/BUS 460 runs along the northwest side of the Spring Hill Cemetery and after they veer onto 12th Street the routes are joined by US BUS 501 at Campbell Avenue. After the bridge over the Norfolk Southern Railway's Danville District rail line all three routes turn south onto Kemper Street, which becomes a four-lane divided highway past 16th Street as it approaches the interchange with US BUS 29, an interchange that stands as the northern terminus of US 221. Kemper Street runs beneath another railroad line then veers back towards Campbell Avenue and ends there, but US BUS 460/501 continue south onto Campbell Avenue, as does the status as a four-lane divided highway until the divider ends just before it crosses a bridge over Norfolk Southern Railway's Blue Ridge District. From there, the routes wind through the mostly residential hills of southeastern Lynchburg, and serves as the northeastern terminus of State Route 128. The undivided section ends southeast of Woodrow Street and a former segment of Campbell Avenue. US BUS 460/501 ends at an interchange with US 460/29 near the Falwell Airport, while US 501 moves onto Campbell Avenue at that interchange towards South Boston, Durham, North Carolina, and Myrtle Beach, South Carolina.

=== Appomattox business loop ===
U.S. Route 460 Business
- Location: Appomattox, Virginia
- Existed: 1994–present

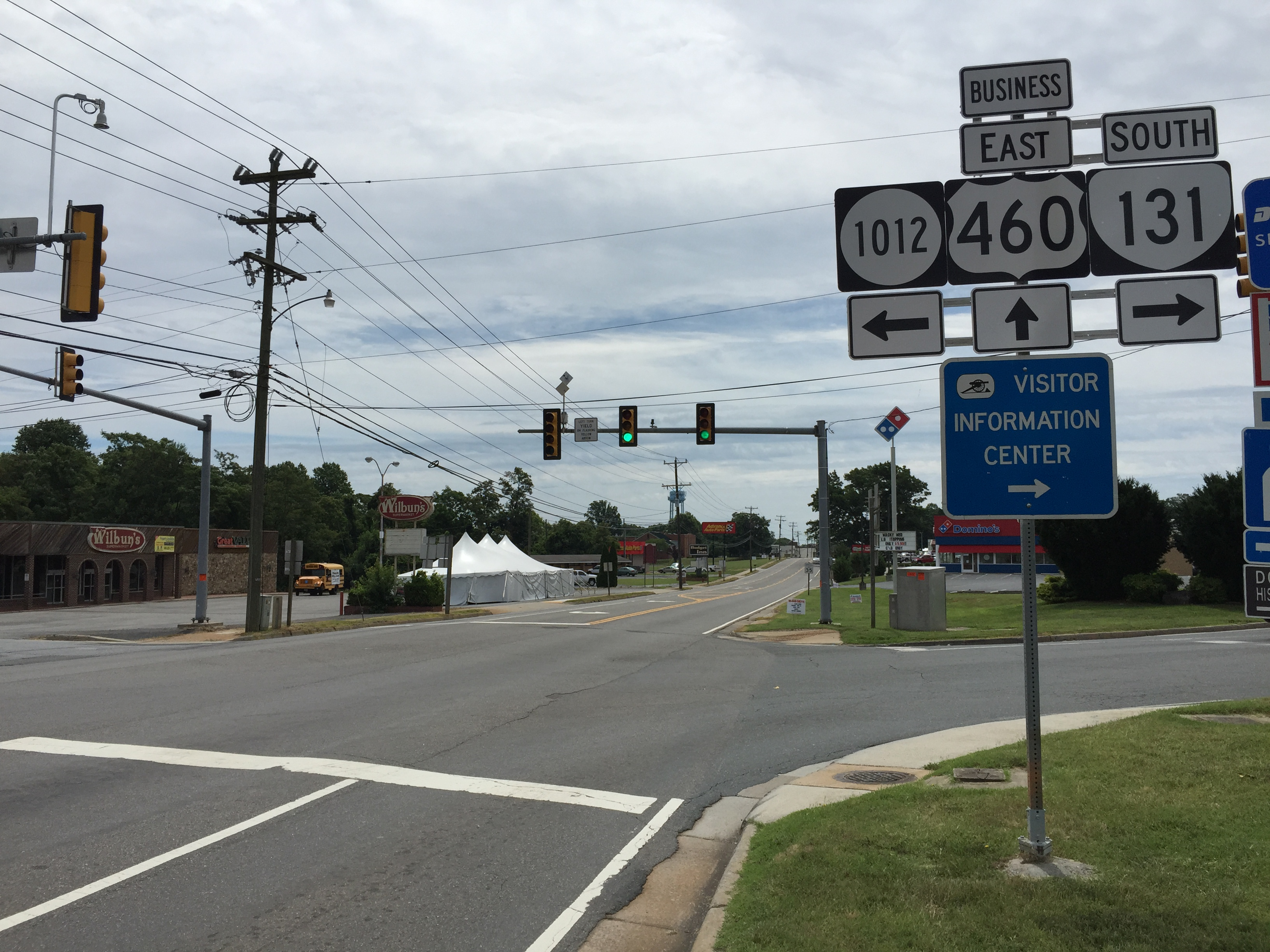
View east along US 460 Bus. at SR 131 and SR 1012 in Appomattox

U.S. Route 460 Business (US 460 Business) is a 3-mile-long (4.8 km) business route of Appomattox, Virginia. The road is named Confederate Boulevard and begins at a diamond interchange along US 460 with the southern terminus of State Route 26, and the east end of the concurrency with US 460 and State Route 24. The concurrency with SR 24 ends shortly after this interchange and makes a left turn onto Old Courthouse Road as it heads for Mt. Rush, Virginia. Simultaneously it joins another concurrency with State Route 131, which ends one block to the southeast. SR 131 leads to the Appomattox Historic District.

A former segment of the Confederate Highway can be found in the form of SR 1004 (Patricia Anne Lane) on the north side of the road, however a much more important intersection is encountered in the form of SR 727 (Church Street), which also leads to the Appomattox Historic District. US BUS 460 then runs between the Appomattox County Middle School and a school bus yard just west of the southeastern terminus of State Route 131, which is across from SR 631 (Oakleigh Avenue) and the eastern terminus of SR 1004. The trajectory of the route begins to curve more towards the east at SR 635. The route ends at a wye interchange at US 460 that includes a single east to west ramp between eastbound US 460 and westbound US BUS 460.

=== Pamplin City business loop ===
U.S. Route 460 Business
- Location: Pamplin City, Virginia
- Existed: 1968–present

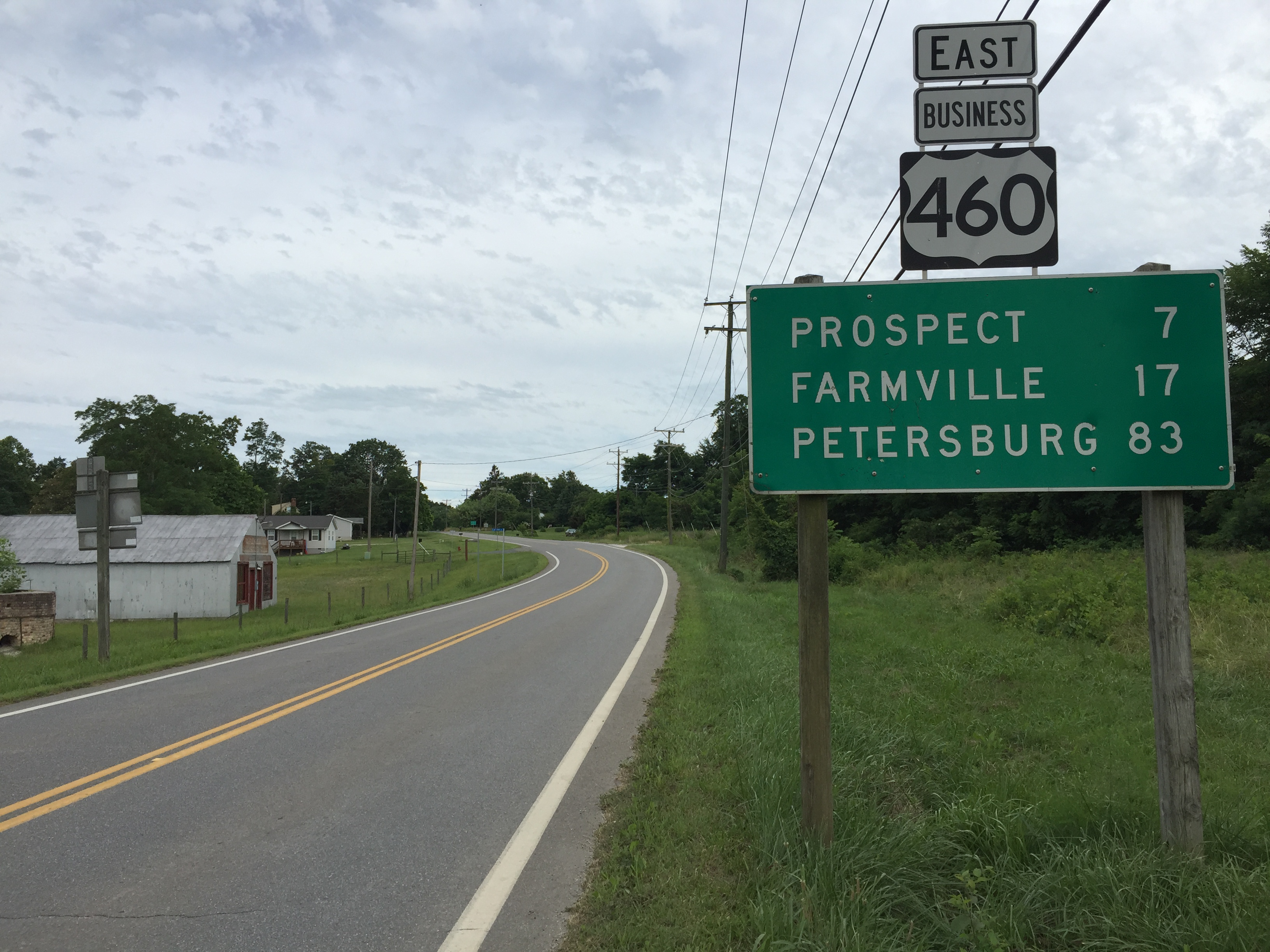
View east along US 460 Bus. past SR 47 in Pamplin City

U.S. Route 460 Business (US 460 Business) is a 3-mile-long (4.8 km) business route of Pamplin City, Virginia. The road is a former segment of US 460 named Pamplin Road which runs southeast into town along the east side of a Norfolk Southern Railroad line and serves as the northern terminus of State Route 47. East of there, the route curves to the northeast and runs along the west side of the High Bridge Trail until terminating at its parent route.

=== Farmville business loop ===
U.S. Route 460 Business
- Location: Farmville, Virginia
- Existed: 1979–present

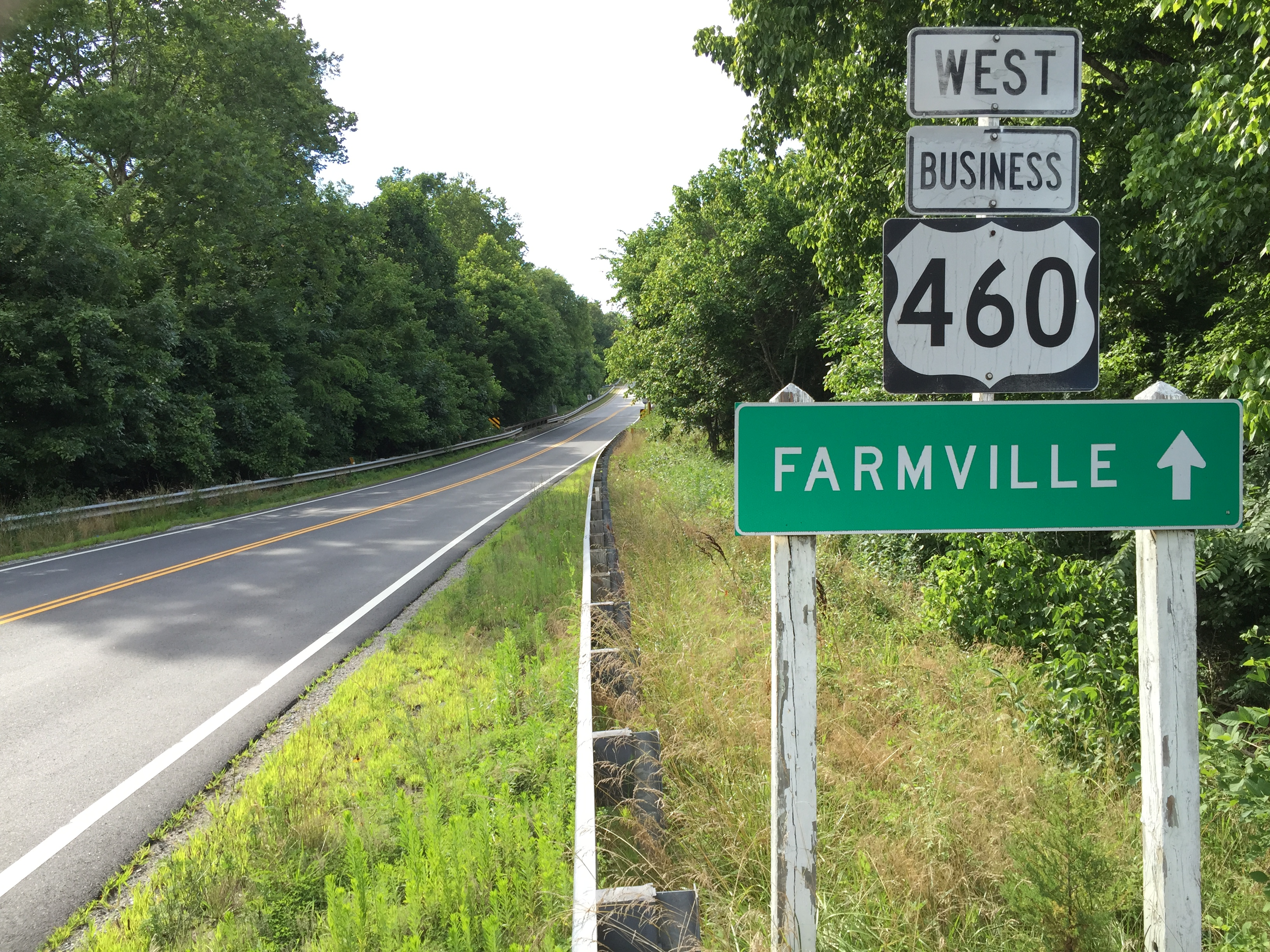
View west at the east end of US 460 Bus. just east of Farmville

U.S. Route 460 Business (US 460 Business) is a 6-mile-long (9.7 km) business route of Farmville, Virginia. It begins at a trumpet interchange with the west end of a concurrency with US 15 and briefly runs north before making a sharp right turn onto U.S. Business Route 15 and SR 695. As US BUS 15/460 gets closer to Downtown Farmville, SR 695 breaks away onto Fairgrounds Road, and the street name becomes West Third Street. The formerly overlapped secondary route intersects again, and later terminates at US BUS 15/460 just north of the High Bridge Trail. Within the Farmville Historic District, US BUS 15 leaves US BUS 460 at the city's four corners at South Main Street which is also the southern terminus of State Route 45 (North Main Street), and US BUS 460 continues onto East Third Street. The route curves toward the southeast occasionally passing some random shopping centers then turns to random residencies and small offices before entering a small swath of oak forest land. After crossing the bridge over Brirey Creek, US BUS 460 finally ends at a wye interchange with US 460 southeast of the town.

=== Burkeville business route ===
U.S. Route 460 Business
- Location: Burkeville, Virginia
- Existed: 1968–present

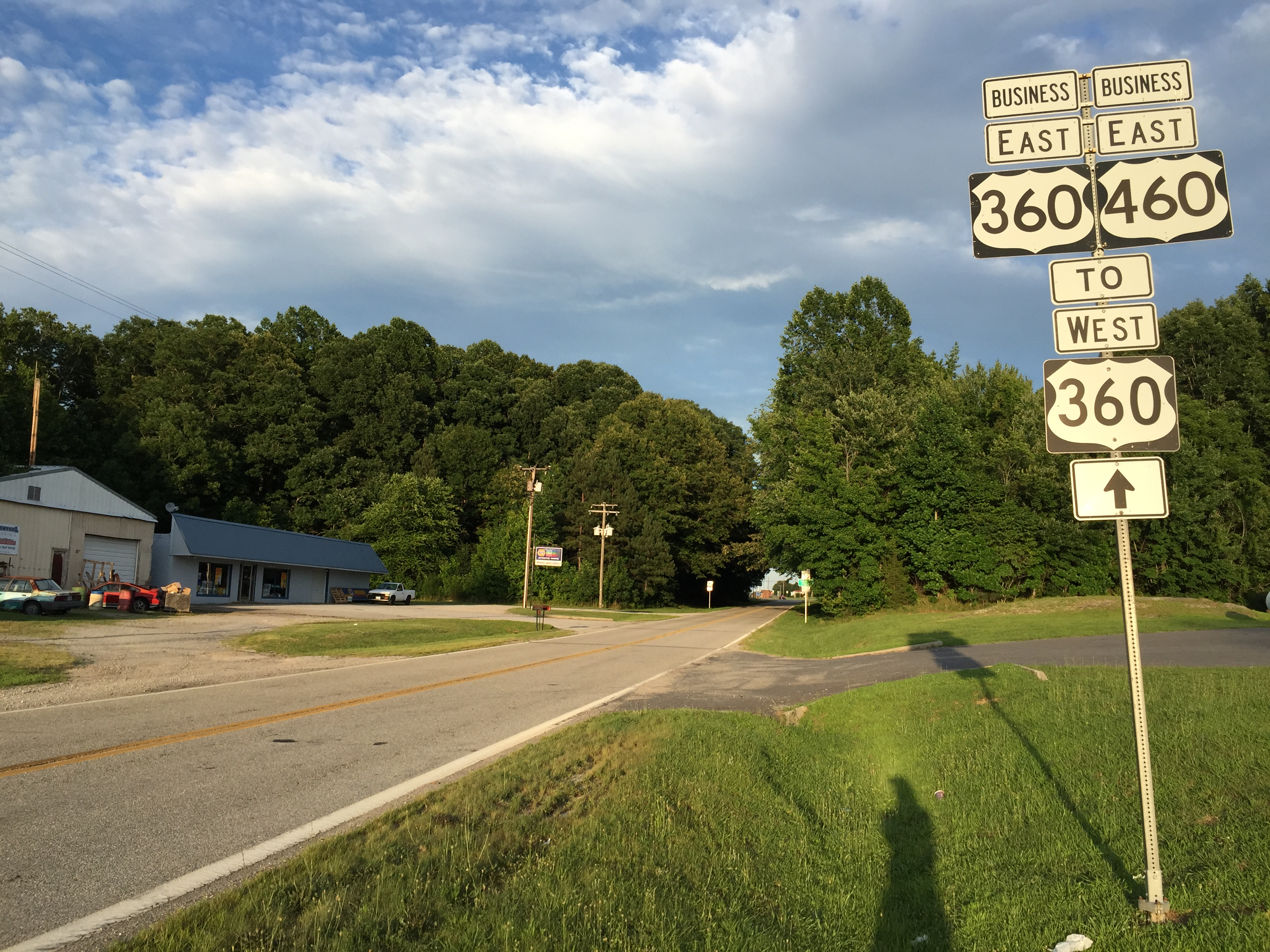
US 360 Bus. and US 460 Bus. at SR 716 just west of Burkeville

U.S. Route 460 Business (US 460 Business) is a 1-mile-long (1.6 km) business route of Burkeville, Virginia. It is named Second Street and is concurrent with US 360 Business for its entire length.

=== Nottoway–Blackstone business loop ===
U.S. Route 460 Business
- Location: Nottoway–Blackstone, Virginia
- Existed: 1976–present

U.S. Route 460 Business (US 460 Business) is a 10-mile-long (16 km) business route of Nottoway and Blackstone, Virginia.

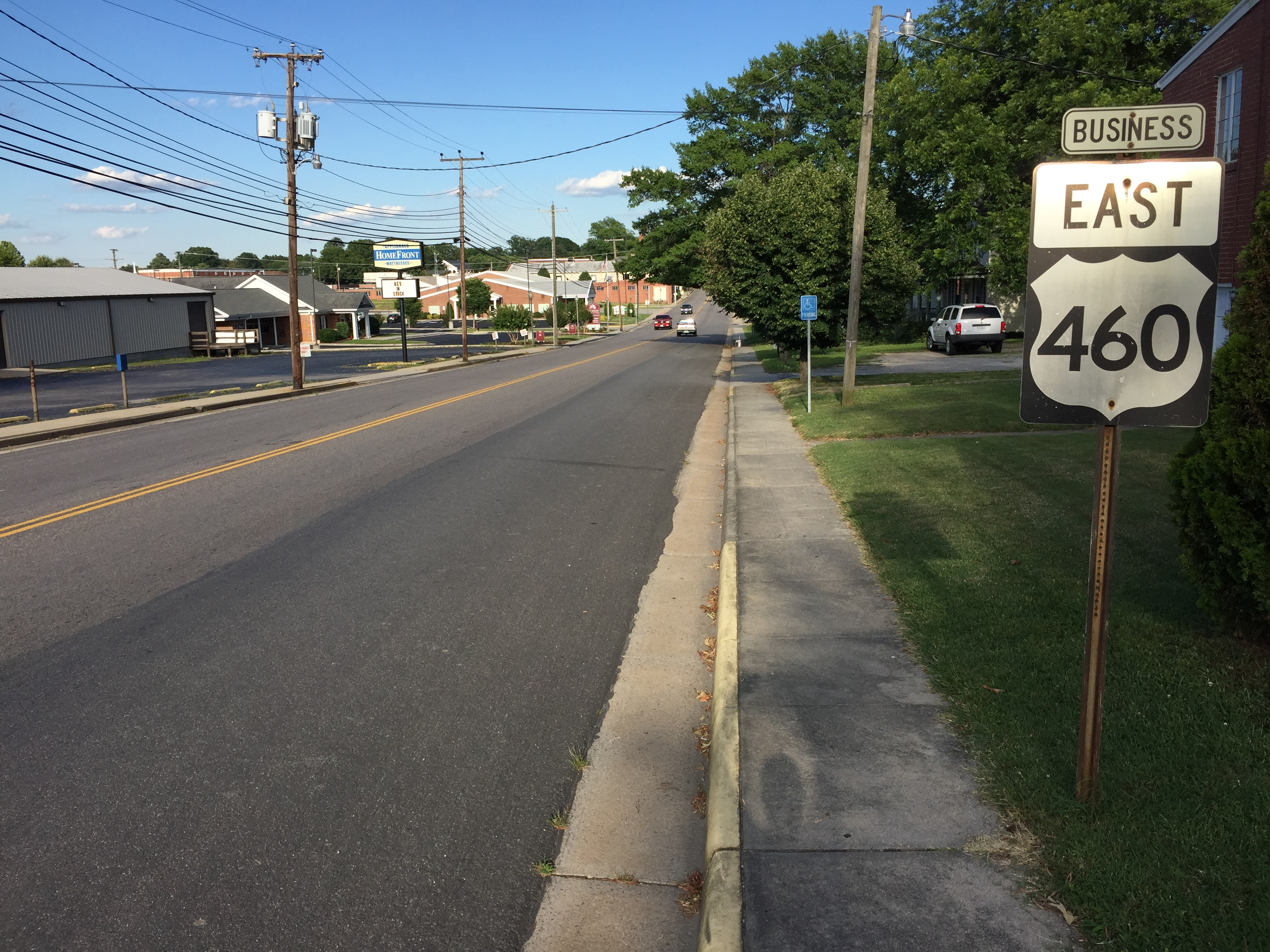
US 460 Bus. eastbound in Blackstone

The route begins at an unusual half-diamond/trumpet interchange onto a street called "Old Nottoway Road" which immediately runs over a bridge over a Norfolk and Western Railroad line southeast of the eastbound on-and-off-ramps of US 460. After the shared intersection with Brick Kiln Lane and Carson Lane, a secondary route veers off to the south named SR 625 (West Courthouse Road), which leads to the historic Nottoway County Courthouse. The rest of the route runs mostly southeast and is almost entirely rural with barren forests interrupted occasionally by farmland, moderate to minor intersections, and abandoned local businesses. The road widens in order to accommodate left-turn lanes in the vicinity of Nottoway High School, but returns to two lanes once it passes the school, returning to its previously described characteristics. Occasionally, the road gets close enough to the Norfolk and Western line it passed over near its western terminus. At a point where the road turns south, it even passes an abandoned restaurant and gas station. In Blackstone, the street name changes from Old Nottoway Road to Church Street, although there are not as many churches along this street as the name implies. There is, however, a religious radio station, a city Department of Public Works office, the Blackstone Christian Church, the Blackstone Presbyterian Church, the Blackstone Volunteer Fire Department on the northwest corner of SR 614 (Mill Street), Blackstone United Methodist Church, and finally the St. Luke's Episcopal Church, where the street ends and US BUS 460 turns north in a concurrency with State Route 40 (South Main Street).

US BUS 460/SR 40 serves as the street where cross streets lose their "West" prefixes and get "East" prefixes and vice versa. They encounter SR 614 again at West/East Irvin Street. South Main Street itself becomes North Main Street at West/East Broad Street. SR 40 turns east onto Dimwiddie Street and US BUS 460 continues north onto North Main Street, which becomes Cox Road as it curves to the northeast and leaves the city limits. The surroundings become rural once again, as the road briefly runs parallel to the previously mentioned Norfolk and Western line, only to move away from the tracks in order to rise over an embankment so that it may cross another bridge over the tracks. US BUS 460 descends from that bridge near a local lumber yard on the south side of the road and north side of the tracks. The road curves to the northeast one last time where it descends as it finally terminates at the intersection of its parent route, which it shares with SR 609 (Yellow Bird Road).

=== Petersburg business loop ===
U.S. Route 460 Business
- Location: Petersburg, Virginia
- Existed: 1990–present

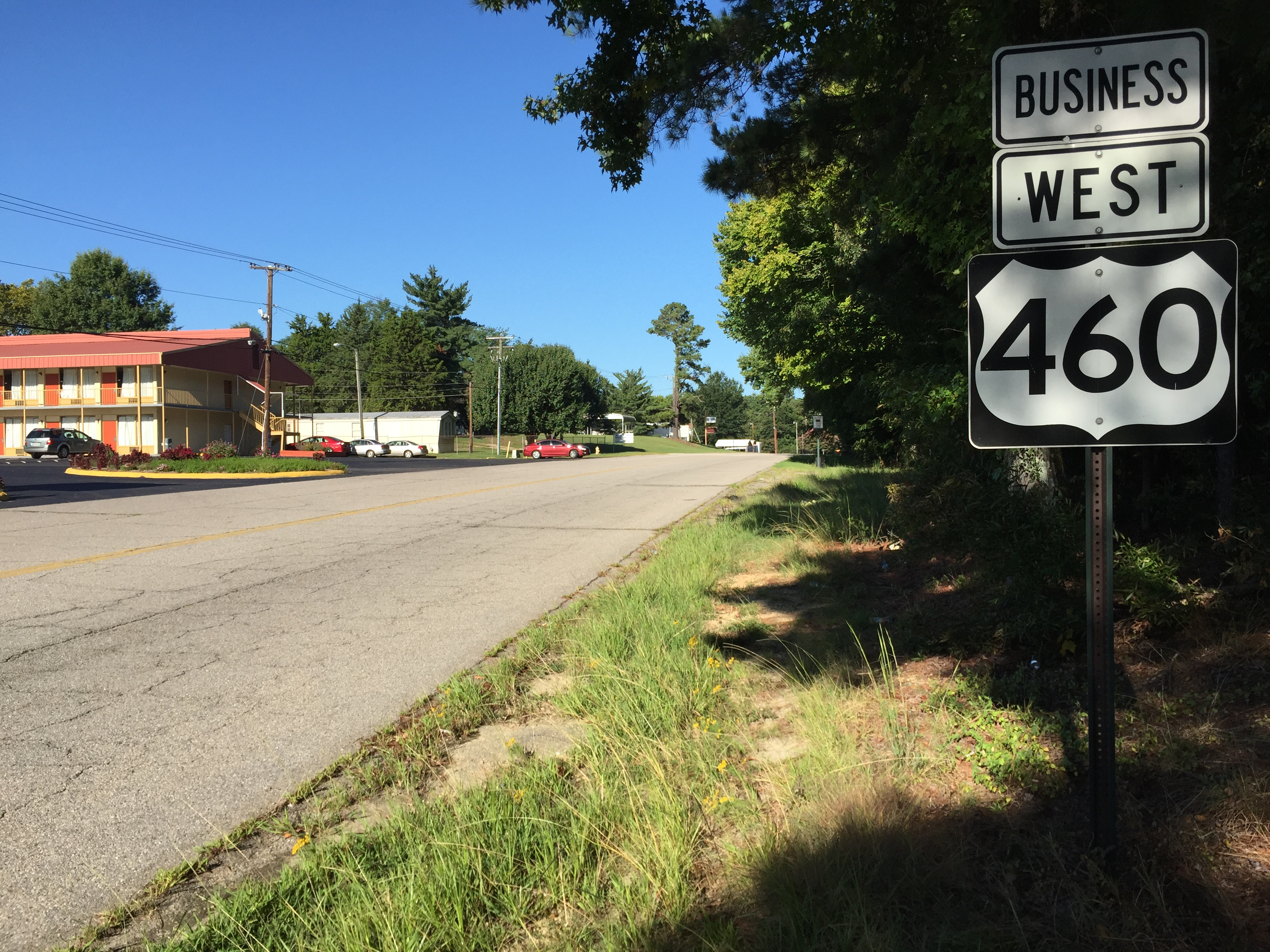
View west along US 460 Bus. in Petersburg

U.S. Route 460 Business (US 460 Business) is a 7-mile-long (11 km) business route of Petersburg, Virginia. The route begins at Interstate 85 where the concurrency between US 1 and US 460 terminates at Exit 63. US 1/BUS 460 makes a sharp turn to the east around Central State Hospital and becomes West Washington Street. After running beneath a railroad bridge signed for Seaboard Systems, the routes become a one-way pair with northeast-bound traffic shifting to West Wythe Street and southeast-bound traffic remaining along West Washington Street. At South Street, the routes are joined by Virginia Truck Route 36. The concurrency with US 1/VA 36 Truck ends at US 301 (Adams Street), and US BUS 460 joins southbound US 301 itself. US 301/BUS 460 continue to run down East Wythe and Washington Streets, and after the first interchange with I-95 at Exit 52, the routes turn south onto South Crater Street. This concurrency only lasts until the second interchange with I-95 at Exit 50 B-C. Here, the eastbound lanes join the southbound frontage road of I-95, while the westbound one joins Winfield Road, which contains two-way traffic until it encounters the northbound I-95 off ramp for Exit 50B. Eastbound US BUS 460's concurrency with I-95 ends at a wye interchange at Exit 50A, and eastbound and westbound segments rejoin again along the route's only independent segment, which ends at Wagner Avenue where it terminates with both its parent route and SR 106.

=== Suffolk business loop ===
U.S. Route 460 Business
- Location: Suffolk, Virginia
- Existed: 1973–present

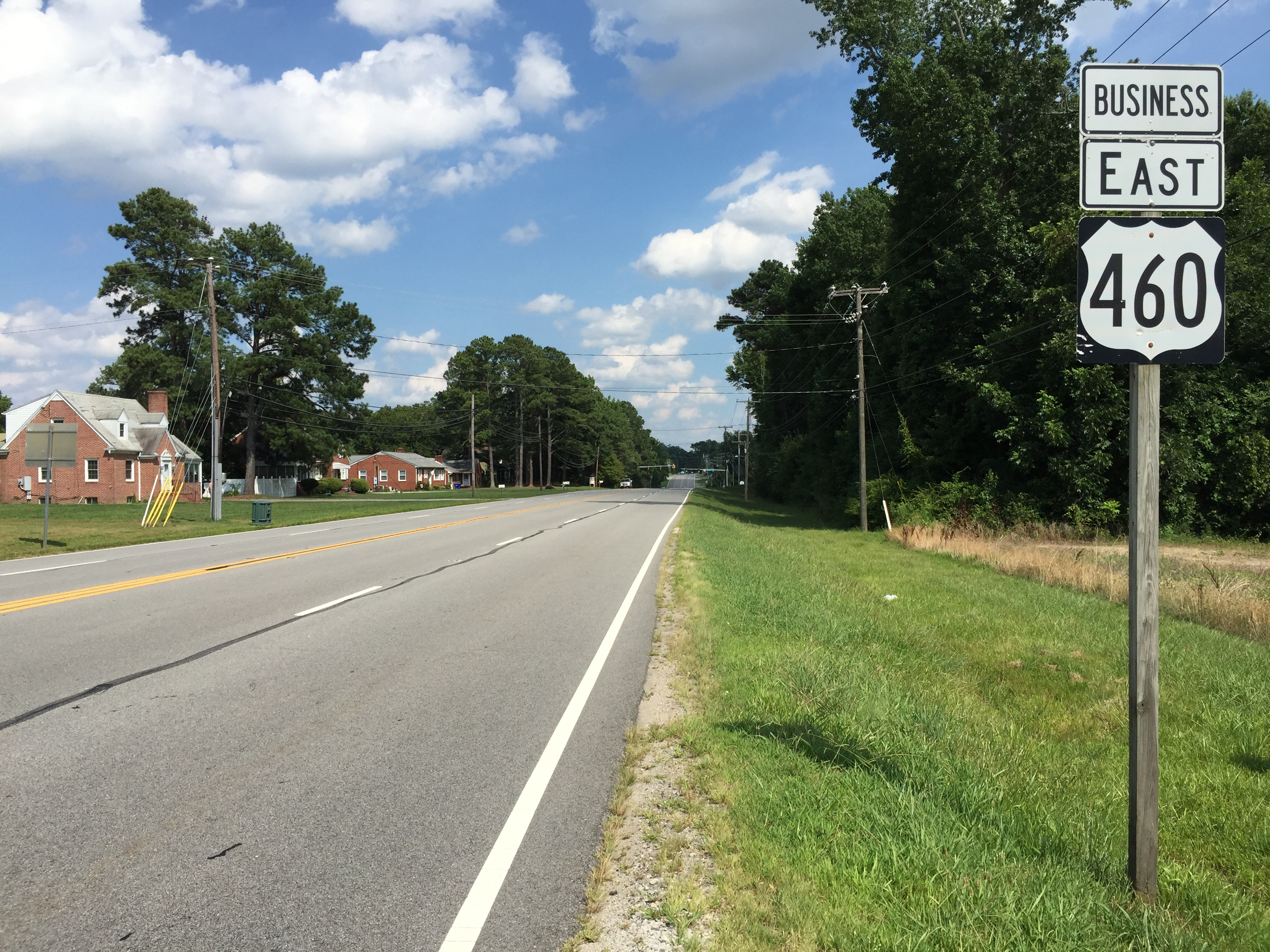
View east at the west end of US 460 Bus. at US 13/US 58/US 460 in Suffolk

U.S. Route 460 Business (US 460 Business) is a 7-mile-long (11 km) business route of Suffolk, Virginia. It begins at the partial cloverleaf interchange and the west end of US 460's concurrencies with US 13 and US 58, running southeast where it crosses over a bridge near Sadler Pond, and then curves to the south as it merges with State Route 10 and State Route 32 running in a short concurrency. The route turns east again at the intersection of US BUS 13 and US BUS 58, and follows that route onto another concurrency which ends at an interchange with US 13/58/460.

=== Chesapeake–Norfolk alternate route ===
U.S. Route 460 Alternate
- Location: Chesapeake–Norfolk, Virginia
- Existed: 1954–present

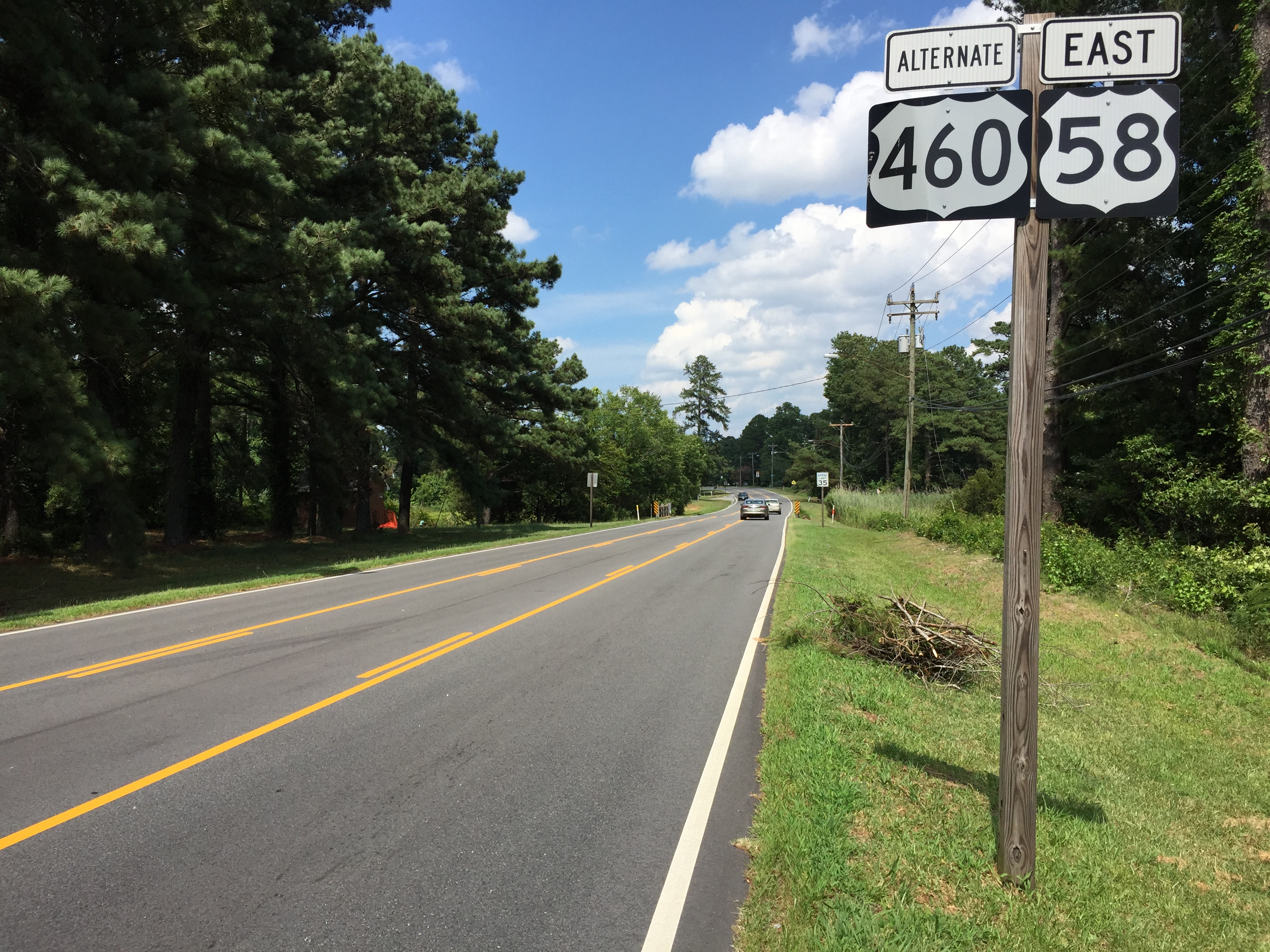
View east along US 460 Alt. and US 58 in Chesapeake

U.S. Route 460 Alternate (US 460 Alternate) is a 12-mile-long (19 km) alternate route between Norfolk and Chesapeake, Virginia. Part of the route is shared with US 58 until it reaches State Route 337, and briefly moves onto a concurrency with that route. After crossing a railroad line it shifts onto an interchange with Interstate 264 at Exit 4 and heads east through a fly-under ramp. The road shares a concurrency with I-264 through the Downtown Tunnel, and then the Berkley Bridge until it leaves at eastbound Exit 10 onto SR 337 again, this time along Tidewater Drive. US BUS 460 ends at US 460, while SR 337 continues northbound towards Interstate 564.

== Former ==
=== Bluefield temporary route ===
Temporary U.S. Route 460
- Location: Bluefield, Virginia–Bluefield, West Virginia

U.S. Route 460 Temporary (US 460 Temporary) was a temporary route in Bluefield, Virginia, and Bluefield, West Virginia.

=== Christiansburg bypass route ===
U.S. Route 460 Bypass
- Location: Christiansburg, Virginia
- Existed: yes

U.S. Route 460 Bypass (US 460 Bypass) was a bypass route of Christiansburg, Virginia.

=== Bedford bypass route ===
U.S. Route 460 Bypass
- Location: Bedford, Virginia
- Existed: yes

U.S. Route 460 Bypass (US 460 Bypass) was a bypass route of Bedford, Virginia.

=== Petersburg alternate route ===
U.S. Route 460 Alternate
- Location: Petersburg, Virginia
- Existed: 1957–1963

U.S. Route 460 Alternate (US 460 Alternate) was a 1-mile-long (1.6 km) alternate route in Petersburg, Virginia.

=== Louisville bypass route ===
U.S. Route 460 Bypass
- Location: Louisville, Kentucky
- Existed: 1933–2003

U.S. Route 460 Bypass (US 460 Bypass) was a 22.93 mile long bypass route in Louisville, Kentucky. It began at US 42 and ended at US 460. It was parallel to and was replaced by Interstate 264.

=== St. Louis spur route ===
U.S. Route 460 Spur
- Location: St. Louis, Missouri
- Existed: 1943–1976

U.S. Route 460 Spur (US 460 Spur) was a 45.33 mile long spur route in St. Louis, Missouri. It began at US 460 and ended at Missouri 250/US 460. It was replaced by parts of Interstate 44 and Interstate 64.

=== Mount Vernon alternate route ===
U.S. Route 460 Alternate
- Location: Mount Vernon, Illinois
- Existed: 1945–1983

U.S. Route 460 Alternate (US 460 Alternate) was a 40.66 mile long alternate route in Mount Vernon, Illinois. It began at US 460 and ended at the junction of Illinois Route 37 Bypass and Illinois Route 37. It and parts of State Route 37 was replaced by parts of Interstate 57 and Interstate 64. It overlapped 37 Bypass the whole length.

== See also ==
- List of special routes of the United States Numbered Highway System
