= Virginia State Route 24 =

State highway in Virginia, US

State Route 24

Route information
- Maintained by VDOT
- Length: 89.57 mi (144.15 km)
- Existed: July 1, 1933–present
- Tourist routes: Virginia Byway

Major junctions
- West end: US 221 / SR 116 in Roanoke
- Future I-73 / I-581 / US 220 in Roanoke; US 29 in Yellow Branch; US 501 in Rustburg; US 460 in Concord through Appomattox
- East end: US 60 in Mt. Rush

Location
- Country: United States
- State: Virginia
- Counties: City of Roanoke, Roanoke, Bedford, Campbell, Appomattox, Buckingham

Highway system
- Virginia Routes; Interstate; US; Primary; Secondary; Byways; History; HOT lanes
← US 23	→ SR 26

State Route 24 (SR 24) is a primary state highway in the U.S. state of Virginia. The state highway runs 89.57 miles (144.15 km) from U.S. Route 221 (US 221) and SR 116 in Roanoke east to US 60 in Mt. Rush. SR 24 connects Roanoke with several small communities in southern Bedford County and central Campbell County. The state highway also runs concurrently with US 460 west of Appomattox and passes through Appomattox Court House National Historical Park, which is the site of Robert E. Lee's final stand and surrender in the American Civil War.

== Route description ==
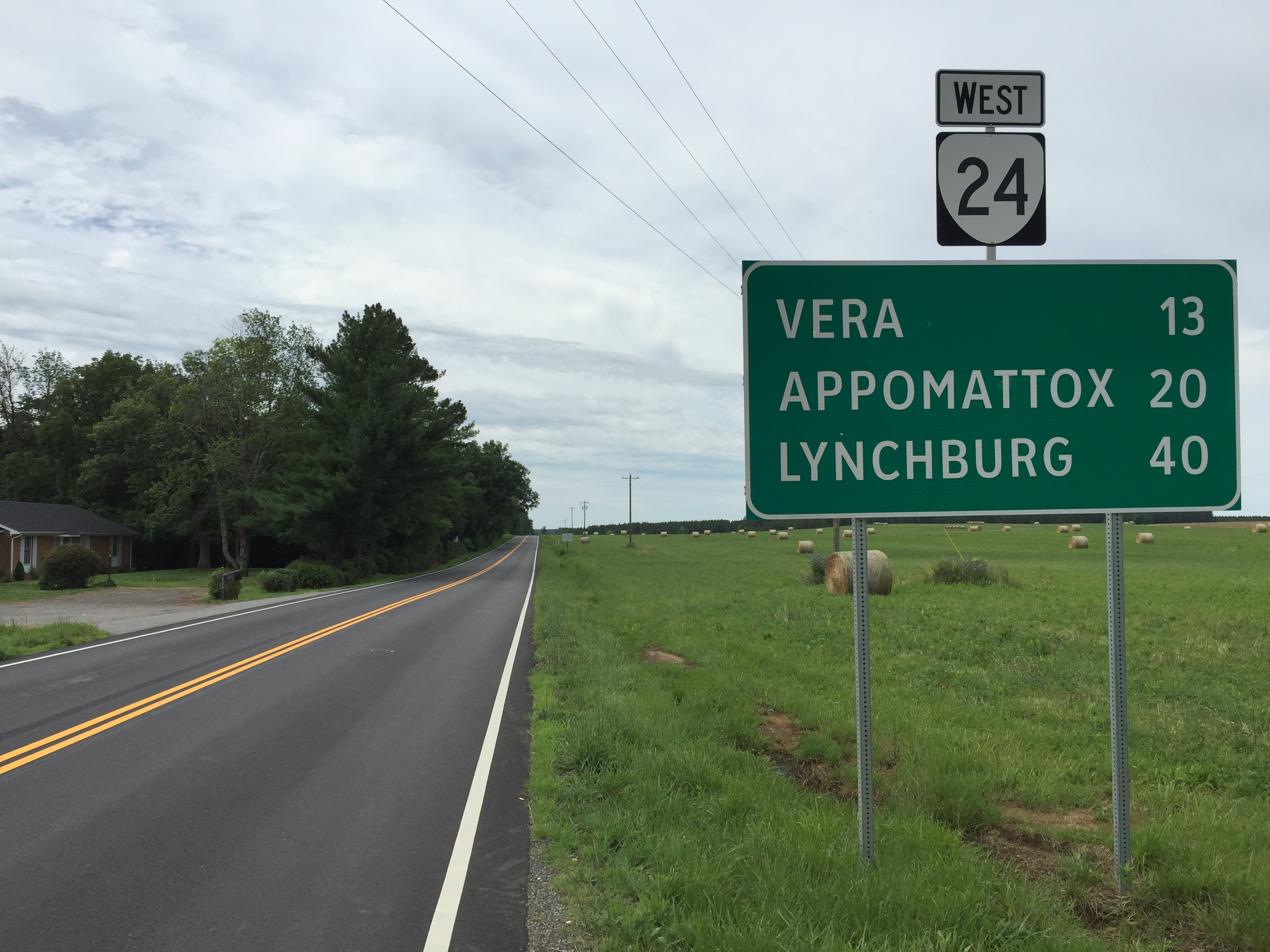
View west at the east end of SR 24 at US 60 in Mt. Rush

SR 24 begins at an intersection with US 221 and SR 116 at the southern edge of downtown Roanoke. SR 116 runs north–south along Jefferson Street; US 221 joins SR 116 north on Jefferson Street and heads west on two-lane undivided Elm Avenue. SR 24 heads east along Elm Avenue, which becomes a four-lane divided boulevard at SR 24's terminus. The state highway intersects Williamson Road and crosses over a rail line before reaching the diamond interchange at the southern terminus of Interstate 581 (I-581). US 220 runs concurrently with I-581 north to I-81 and south solo as the Roy Webber Expressway toward Rocky Mount. East of I-581 and US 220, SR 24 splits into a one-way pair that follows Bullitt Avenue eastbound and Jamison Avenue westbound. The two directions come together at 13th Street to form four-lane divided Dale Avenue, along which the state highway crosses over a rail line and Tinker Creek to leave the city of Roanoke.

SR 24 continues through the town of Vinton in Roanoke County as Virginia Avenue, which bypasses the center of town to the south. At Chestnut Street, the four-lane divided boulevard transitions onto Hardy Road; when Hardy Road continues east, SR 24 curves north as Bypass Road, which ends at Washington Avenue, the main street of Vinton. The state highway heads east along Washington Avenue to the town limit of Vinton at Wolf Creek. SR 24 has an interchange with the Blue Ridge Parkway at a low gap in the Blue Ridge Mountains between Stewart Knob and Chestnut Mountain immediately before the highway enters Bedford County, where its name changes to Stewartsville Road. The state highway remains a four-lane divided highway to just east of Stewartsville. SR 24 continues east as a two-lane undivided road through the southern Bedford County community of Chamblissburg and Meads Store.

SR 24 crosses Goose Creek shortly before intersecting SR 122 (Moneta Road) west of the hamlet of Body Camp. The state highway continues east as Shingle Block Road to its western intersection with SR 43 (Virginia Byway). SR 24 and SR 43 continue east along Glenwood Drive to their split at Gillespie, where SR 43 heads south as Leesville Road. SR 24 continues northeast as Wyatts Way, which enters Campbell County in the middle of its curvaceous course between its crossing of the Big Otter River and the village of Evington. The state highway, now named Colonial Highway, intersects US 29 (Wards Road) at Yellow Branch on its way to Rustburg, which sits at the southern end of Long Mountain. SR 24 runs concurrently through the county seat with US 501, which heads south as Brookneal Highway toward Brookneal and north as Campbell Highway toward Lynchburg.

SR 24 continues northeast as Village Highway to Concord, where the state highway joins US 460 (Richmond Highway). The four-lane divided highway immediately enters Appomattox County, where the two highways pass through Spout Spring on their way to the county seat of Appomattox. US 460 and SR 24 have a diamond interchange with US 460 Business and the south end of SR 26 (Oakville Road) on the northwest side of the town. SR 24 and US 460 diverge at the following diamond interchange with Old Courthouse Road, which heads south toward the Appomattox Historic District as SR 131. SR 24 heads northeast as a two-lane undivided road through Appomattox Court House National Historical Park, within which the highway crosses the headwaters of the Appomattox River. The state highway heads through the hamlet of Vera and passes through sections of Appomattox-Buckingham State Forest as the highway enters Buckingham County and becomes named Mt. Rush Highway. SR 24 passes through Sliders and crosses the upper reaches of the Slate River before reaching its eastern terminus at US 60 (James Anderson Highway) in Mt. Rush.

== Major intersections ==
County	Location	mi	km	Destinations	Notes
City of Roanoke		0.00	0.00	US 221 / SR 116 (Elm Avenue/Jefferson Street)	Western terminus
City of Roanoke		0.17	0.27	Future I-73 / I-581 north / US 220 – Lexington, Salem, Roanoke Regional Airport	Southern terminus of I-581; exit 6 on I-581/US 220
Roanoke		5.46	8.79	Blue Ridge Parkway	Interchange
Bedford		22.89	36.84	SR 122 (Moneta Road) – Bedford, Rocky Mount, Smith Mountain Lake	
Bedford		28.40	45.71	SR 43 north (Virginia Byway) – Bedford	Western end of SR 43 concurrency
Bedford	Gillespie	30.98	49.86	SR 43 south (Leesville Road) – Altavista, Huddleston, Smith Mountain Lake	Eastern end of SR 43 concurrency
Campbell	Evington			SR 811 north (Ridge Road) – New London	former SR 127 north
Campbell	Yellow Branch	47.31	76.14	US 29 (Wards Road) – Lynchburg, Danville	
Campbell	Rustburg	51.63	83.09	US 501 south (Brookneal Highway) – Brookneal, South Boston	Western end of US 501 concurrency
Campbell	Rustburg	52.55	84.57	US 501 north (Campbell Highway) – Lynchburg, Buena Vista	Eastern end of US 501 concurrency
Appomattox	Concord	62.09	99.92	US 460 west (Richmond Highway) / SR 608 north (Stonewall Road) – Stonewall, Lynchburg	Western end of US 460 concurrency
Appomattox	Appomattox	69.99	112.64	US 460 Bus. east / SR 26 north – Appomattox, Bent Creek	interchange; western terminus of US 460 Bus.; southern terminus of SR 26
Appomattox	Appomattox	70.71	113.80	US 460 east / SR 131 south (Old Courthouse Road) – Farmville, Appomattox	interchange; eastern end of US 460 concurrency; northern terminus of SR 131
Buckingham	Mt. Rush	89.57	144.15	US 60 (West James Anderson Highway) – Lexington, Buckingham CH, Richmond	Eastern terminus
1.000 mi = 1.609 km; 1.000 km = 0.621 mi: Concurrency terminus

< SR 103	Spurs of SR 10; 1923–1928	SR 105 >
< SR 206	District 2 State Routes; 1928–1933	SR 208 >
< SR 305	District 3 State Routes; 1928–1933	SR 307 >
< SR 307	District 3 State Routes; 1928–1933	SR 309 >
< SR 323	District 3 State Routes; 1928–1933	SR 325 >
