= Virginia State Route 26 =

State highway in Appomattox County, Virginia, US

State Route 26
- Oakville Road

Route information
- Maintained by VDOT
- Length: 12.83 mi (20.65 km)
- Existed: July 1, 1933–present

Major junctions
- South end: US 460 / SR 24 / US 460 Bus. in Appomattox
- North end: US 60 / SR 605 in Bent Creek

Location
- Country: United States
- State: Virginia
- Counties: Appomattox

Highway system
- Virginia Routes; Interstate; US; Primary; Secondary; Byways; History; HOT lanes
← SR 24	→ SR 27

State Route 26 (SR 26) is a primary state highway in the U.S. state of Virginia. Known as Oakville Road, the state highway runs 12.83 miles (20.65 km) from U.S. Route 460 (US 460), SR 24, and US 460 Business in Appomattox north to US 60 in Bent Creek.

== Route description ==
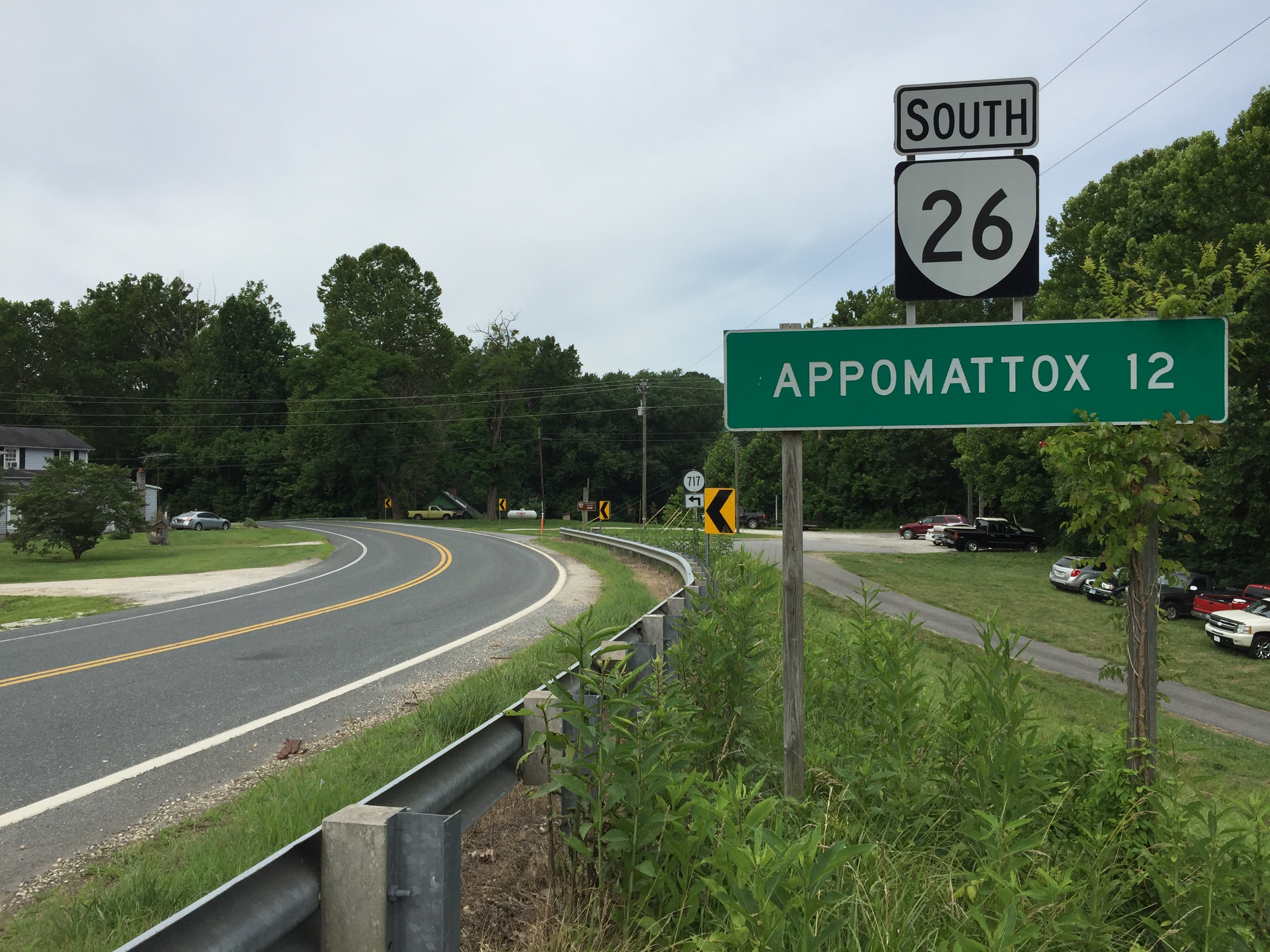
View south at the north end of SR 26 at US 60 and SR 605 in Bent Creek

SR 26 begins as a four-lane divided highway at a diamond interchange with US 460 and SR 24 (Richmond Highway) just north of the town of Appomattox. The roadway continues south of the expressway bypass of the town as US 460 Business (Confederate Boulevard), which leads to the Appomattox Historic District. SR 26 reduces to a two-lane undivided road and heads north as Oakville Road through northwestern Appomattox County. The state highway passes through the hamlet of Oakville. Near the northern end of SR 26, the highway descends into the narrow valley of Bent Creek. The state highway crosses the stream just south of the stream's mouth at the James River. A short distance to the north, SR 26 reaches its terminus at US 60 (James Anderson Highway) in the hamlet of Bent Creek just south of the U.S. Highway's crossing of the James River.

== Major intersections ==
The entire route is in Appomattox County.

Location	mi	km	Destinations	Notes
Appomattox	0.00	0.00	US 460 / SR 24 (Richmond Highway) / US 460 Bus. east (Oakville Road) – Appomattox, Farmville, Lynchburg, Appomattox Court House National Historical Park	Interchange; southern terminus
Bent Creek	12.83	20.65	US 60 (Anderson Highway) / SR 605 north (Riverside Drive) – Amherst, Buckingham CH, James River State Park	Northern terminus
1.000 mi = 1.609 km; 1.000 km = 0.621 mi

== History ==
The route originally continued south of Appomattox through to Charlotte and Halifax Counties, passing by what is now VA 40 in Phenix and ending at what is now VA 92 in the former town of Clover. The Appomattox-Phenix portion is now SR 727, while the Phenix-Clover portion is now SR 746.

< SR 306	District 3 State Routes; 1928–1933	SR 308 >
< SR 326	District 3 State Routes; 1928–1933	none
