= VA111 =

VA-111 may refer to:

- Attack Squadron 111 (U.S. Navy)
- State Route 111 (Virginia)
- VA-111 Shkval, a Russian supercaviting submarine torpedo
