= Concord, Campbell County, Virginia =

Coordinates: 37°20′34″N 78°58′30″W

Concord, Virginia
- Census-designated place
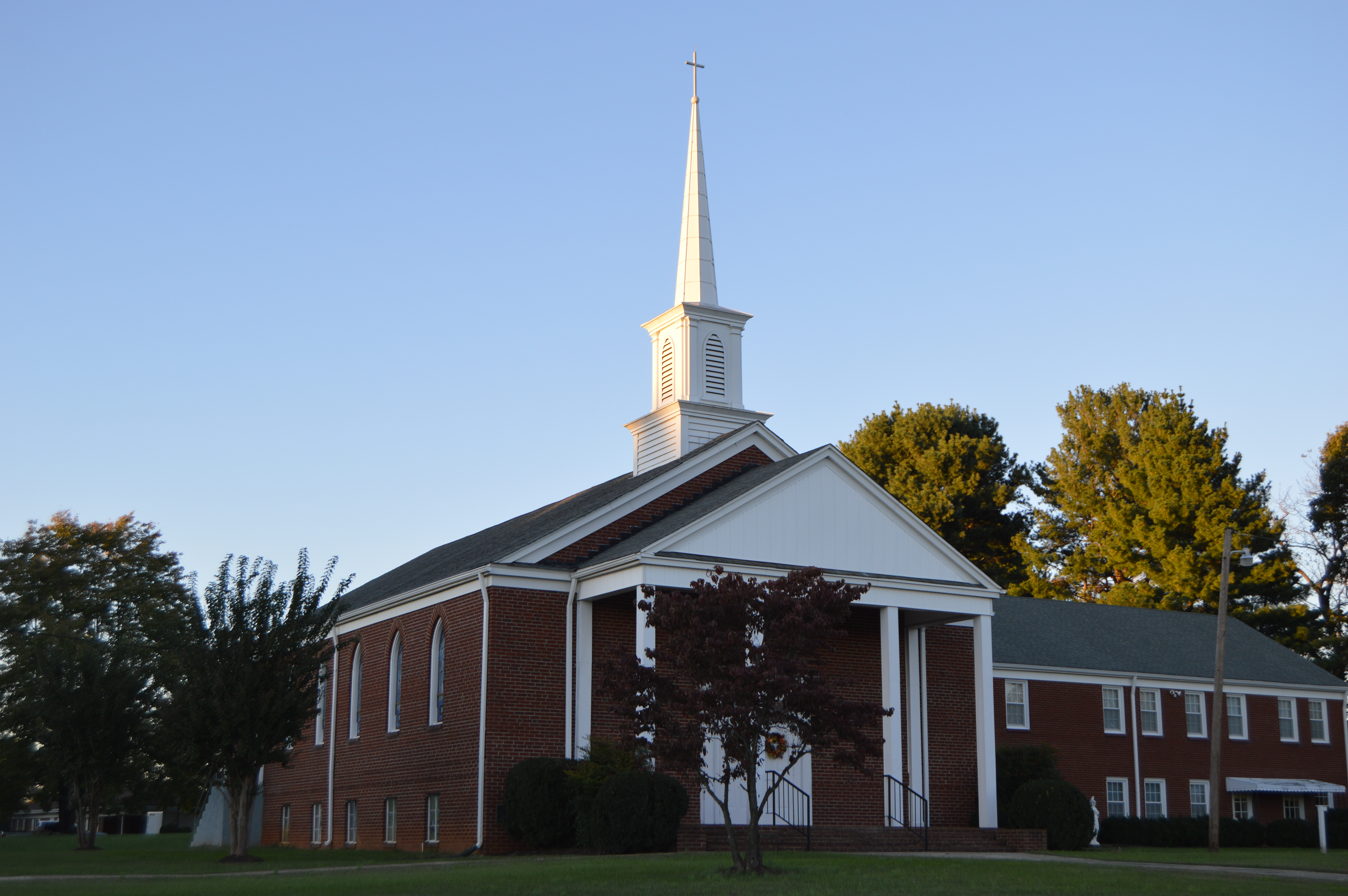
- Methodist church
- Interactive map of Concord, Virginia
- Country: United States
- State: Virginia
- County: Campbell, Appomattox

Population (2010)
  - Total: 1,458
- Time zone: UTC-5 (Eastern (EST))
  - Summer (DST): UTC-4 (EDT)
- ZIP code: 24538
- Area code: 434

Concord is a census-designated place (CDP) in Appomattox and Campbell counties in the U.S. state of Virginia. The population as of the 2010 census was 1,458.

This town was a stop on the Southside Railroad in the mid-nineteenth century. This became the Atlantic, Mississippi and Ohio Railroad in 1870 and then a line in the Norfolk and Western Railway and now the Norfolk Southern Railway. Sylvia Trent-Adams grew up on a farm in Concord.

== Major highways ==
- U.S. Route 460
- Virginia State Route 24

== Campbell County Board of Supervisors ==
- Matt Cline - Concord

== Nearby attractions ==
- Appomattox Court House National Historical Park
- James River State Park
- Smith Mountain Lake
- Leesville Lake
- Historic Lynchburg
- Lynchburg Hillcats (Minor League Baseball)

== Demographics ==
Historical population
Census	Pop.	Note	%±
U.S. Decennial Census; 2010 2020

Concord was first listed as a census designated place in the 2010 U.S. census.

As of the census of 2000, there were 3,657 people and 1,491 households residing in the ZIP Code Tabulation Area for Concord's ZIP code (24538).

== Education ==
- Concord Elementary School
