= Kentucky Route 1143 =

State highway in Kentucky, United States

Kentucky Route 1143
- KY 1143 highlighted in red

Route information
- Maintained by KYTC
- Length: 2.664 mi (4.287 km)

Major junctions
- South end: US 460 / US 460 Byp. in Georgetown
- North end: KY 32 in Georgetown

Location
- Country: United States
- State: Kentucky
- Counties: Scott

Highway system
- Kentucky State Highway System; Interstate; US; State; Parkways

Kentucky Route 1143 (KY 1143) is a 2.7-mile (4.3 km) state highway in Kentucky maintained by the Kentucky Transportation Cabinet (KYTC).

== Route description ==
KY 1143 starts at an interchange with U.S. Route 460 (US 460) and US 460 Bypass near Great Crossing. Shortly after, it intersects Betsy Way to provide access to Great Crossing High School. It then runs through a rural area until its terminus at KY 32. It is primarily used by Scott County Schools, and Toyota.

== Future ==
There is currently construction to provide an expansion to KY 1143, which starts at its terminus at KY 32, adding a roundabout and then continues northbound to connect to KY 620, US 25, and Interstate 75 at exit 129.

== Major Intersections ==
The entire route is in Georgetown, Scott County.

mi	km	Destinations	Notes
0.000	0.000	US 460 (Frankfort Pike) / US 460 Byp. (McClelland Circle)	Southern terminus
0.533	0.858	Betsy Way	Access for Great Crossing High School Campus
2.664	4.287	KY 32 (Long Lick Pike)	Northern terminus
1.000 mi = 1.609 km; 1.000 km = 0.621 mi
