= Virginia State Route 111 =

State highway in Montgomery County, Virginia, US

State Route 111

Route information
- Maintained by VDOT
- Length: 2.26 mi (3.64 km)
- Existed: 1933–present

Major junctions
- West end: US 460 Bus. in Christiansburg
- East end: US 11 / US 460 Bus. in Christiansburg

Location
- Country: United States
- State: Virginia
- Counties: Montgomery

Highway system
- Virginia Routes; Interstate; US; Primary; Secondary; Byways; History; HOT lanes
← SR 110	→ SR 112

State Route 111 (SR 111) is a primary state highway in the U.S. state of Virginia. The state highway runs 2.26 miles (3.64 km) from U.S. Route 460 Business (US 460 Business) east to US 11 and US 460 Business within Christiansburg.

== Route description ==
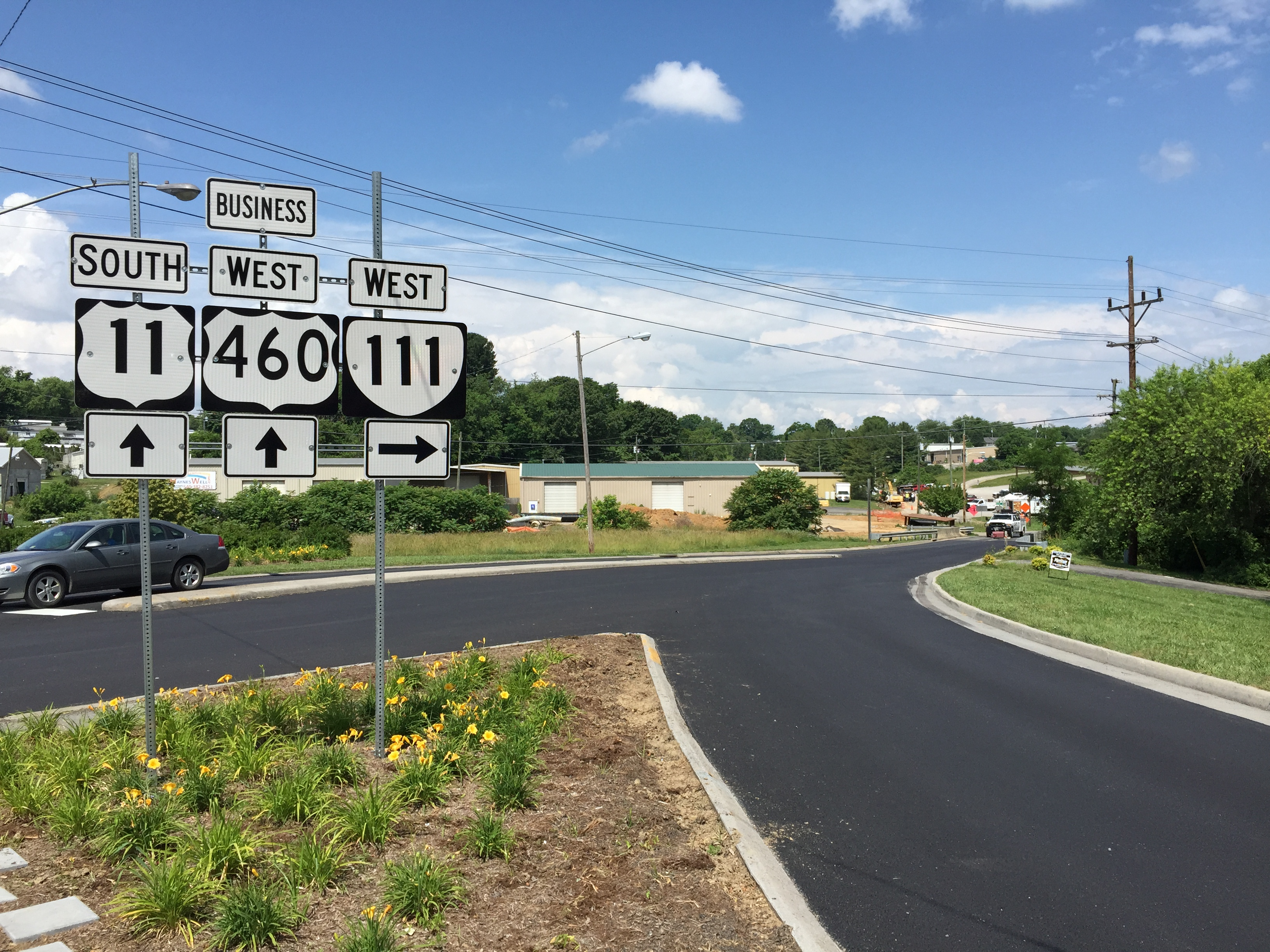
View west at the east end of SR 111 at US 11 and US 460 Bus. in Christiansburg

SR 111 begins at an intersection with US 460 Business (Franklin Street) on the north side of the town of Christiansburg. The intersection is immediately south of the business route's interchange with mainline US 460. SR 111 heads east as two-lane undivided Cambria Street, which parallels the US 460 freeway to just west of Yellow Sulphur Road, where the street curves south. The state highway has a grade crossing of Norfolk Southern Railway's Christiansburg District immediately before curving to the east. Within the curve, SR 111 intersects Depot Street, which heads south to downtown Christiansburg. SR 111 continues east along Depot Street parallel to the rail line, then veers southeast to the highway's eastern terminus at US 11 and US 460 Business (Roanoke Street) on the east side of Christiansburg.

== Major intersections ==
The entire route is in Christiansburg, Montgomery County.

mi	km	Destinations	Notes
0.00	0.00	US 460 Bus. (North Franklin Street) – Christiansburg, Blacksburg, Bluefield	Western terminus
2.26	3.64	US 11 / US 460 Bus. (Roanoke Street) to I-81	Eastern terminus
1.000 mi = 1.609 km; 1.000 km = 0.621 mi

< SR 217	District 2 State Routes; 1928–1933	SR 219 >
