= Mt. Rush, Virginia =

Unincorporated community in Buckingham County, Virginia, USA

Coordinates: 37°32′17″N 78°36′50″W

Mt. Rush is an unincorporated community in Buckingham County, Virginia, United States. It is located at the eastern terminus of State Route 24, at Highway 60. Its elevation is 509 feet (155 meters). The geographical center of Virginia is approximately two miles (3.2 km) south and 0.5 mile (0.8 km) west of the community.
