= Bent Creek, Virginia =

Unincorporated community in Virginia, United States

Bent Creek Bentcreek, Duguidsville
- Unincorporated community
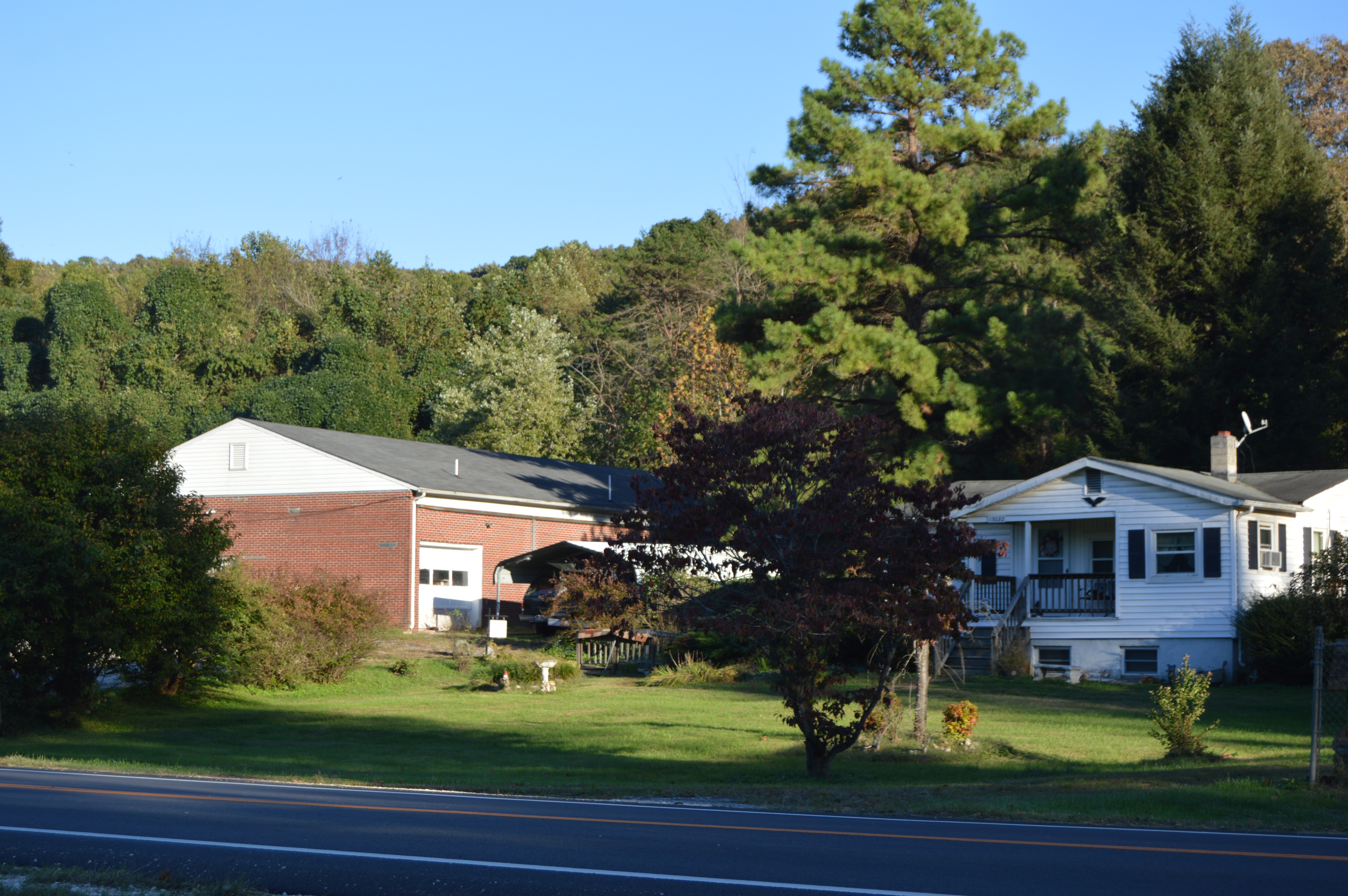
- House and general store on State Route 26

- Location in Virginia Location in the United States
- Coordinates: 37°32′06″N 78°49′37″W
- Country: United States
- State: Virginia
- County: Appomattox
- Elevation: 417 ft (127 m)
- Time zone: UTC-5 (Eastern Time)
  - Summer (DST): UTC-4 (Eastern Daylight Time)
- ZIP code: 24553
- GNIS feature ID: 1477779

Bent Creek is an unincorporated community in Appomattox County, Virginia, United States.

== History ==
A chapel was located here before 1751. It was destroyed by fire in 1790.

The settlement was established in 1792 by the Virginia General Assembly and was first named "Diuguidsville", after William Diuguid, an early Scottish settler (and first cousin of Patrick Henry). A bridge across the James River was located here, and Diuguidsville was "a flourishing town" before the Civil War.

The first post office in Appomattox County was established here in 1801.

Diuguidsville was "a town of considerable size", and in 1836, contained a tavern, tobacco warehouse, physician, blacksmith, two grocery stores, three general stores, 16 houses, and a "house of private entertainment". A Baptist church—possibly the first Baptist church in Virginia—was built on a hill overlooking the settlement.

In March of 1865, "the townspeople of Diuguidsville burned the covered bridge here" to prevent Federal forces from crossing. The bridge was rebuilt in 1922.

"Today, Bent Creek, formerly Diuguidsville, is a quiet rural community sprawled along the banks of the James River".
