= Fincastle Turnpike =

The Fincastle Turnpike, also known as the "Fincastle and Blue Ridge Turnpike Company", was approved in 1834 by the Virginia General Assembly to maintain a toll turnpike that followed part of the Wilderness Road from Fincastle, Virginia, to the Cumberland Gap. The Fincastle Turnpike also connected Narrows, Virginia and Tazewell, Virginia along the way to the Cumberland Gap, following roughly what is today parts of Virginia State Route 42 and Virginia State Route 61.

== Toll road ==
With the increase in commerce during the 1830s, Virginia increased the length and number of roads and turnpikes in the state. The Fincastle Turnpike was envisioned to assist commerce between the far southwestern parts of the state that were partially isolated due to difficult road conditions. In order to keep costs low, each county that the Fincastle Turnpike passed through was responsible for maintaining and improving their section. The turnpike passed through Botetourt County, Craig County, Virginia, Giles County, Virginia, Bland County, Virginia, Tazewell County, Virginia, Russell County, Virginia and then rejoined the Wilderness Road in Scott County, Virginia and Lee County, Virginia.

Improvements were not only applied to the road, but to ordinaries and inns along the turnpike as well. In Botetourt County, an account along the route states: "The Fincastle-Blue Ridge Turnpike was completed in 1835, connecting to the Lynchburg-Salem Turnpike over the mountain through Black Horse Gap. Joseph and Polly operated the White Horse Stagecoach Inn on their farm, housing and feeding many Turnpike travelers."

The turnpike was over 248 miles long, and the basic improvements were not completed until 1841. The entire length of the wagon turnpike was to have a standard width of at least eighteen feet, with the center of the road at least eighteen inches higher than either side along the horizontal line, allowing for the runoff of rain and snow. Soft spots in the roadbed could not exceed 5% of the length of each section. The Commonwealth retained $2,752.00 worth of stock in the Fincastle And Blue Ridge Turnpike Company.

Until the 1850s, in Tazewell County, Virginia, the Fincastle Turnpike was the principal thoroughfare used by the farmers for sending their products to the eastern markets. Everything purchased in the eastern counties for consumption in Tazewell were sent there over the turnpike. Cattle droves in the thousands were herded up and down the turnpike as the farmers sent their cattle to market in eastern and northern Virginia.

== Collapse ==
Many of the counties simply refused to maintain the turnpike. Constant bickering and arguments over the turnpike made political cooperation between and within the counties impossible. Tolls stops were expected every fifteen miles, but disputes about rates, contracted toll collections, bonded debt for construction and excess funds returned to the Commonwealth made the turnpike unworkable. By 1846, it was recognized that a standardized turnpike could not be cooperatively maintained through this part of Virginia. The turnpike roadbed was turned over to the various counties by the state, and alternate and less argumentative routes were proposed. "Shortly after turning the Fincastle Turnpike over to the counties the state authorized the construction of the Southwest Turnpike from Salem, Virginia to Bristol, Virginia, thus bypassing the counties that refused to support the Fincastle Turnpike. The Southwest Turnpike survives today as Interstate 81."

== Bibliography ==
- Botetourt County 1770-1970. Roanoke, Va: Roanoke Historical Society, 1970. Journal of the Roanoke Historical Society, v. 6, no. 2. Turnpike through Botetourt. by Edmund P. Goodwin.
- "The County's First Highway." Johnson, Charles A. 1988. A Narrative History of Wise County, Virginia. Pages 67–77. This chapter also includes the text of the original acts of the General Assembly for the surveying and construction of the turnpike.
- Schreiner-Yantis, Netti. Archives of the Pioneers of Tazewell County, Virginia. Springfield, VA: N. Schreiner-Yantis, 1992. Notes: Originally published 1973. Reprinted 1992, with map insert ("flyleaf"): Fincastle-Cumberland Gap Turnpike, containing names referenced in the index. Description: 345 pages: illustrations, genealogical tables, maps; 29 cm + 1 map.
- "The Turnpikes of Southwest Virginia." 2002. Journal, History Museum & Historical Society of Western Virginia. Volume 15. Page 29 et seq.
- Virginia. Fincastle and Blue Ridge Turnpike Company Records. 1833. Abstract: The records contain letters sent, field notes (1833), 1 vol., map, n.d., reports, lists of stockholders, certificates of stock subscriptions, and contracts.
