= James River State Park =

State park in Virginia, USA

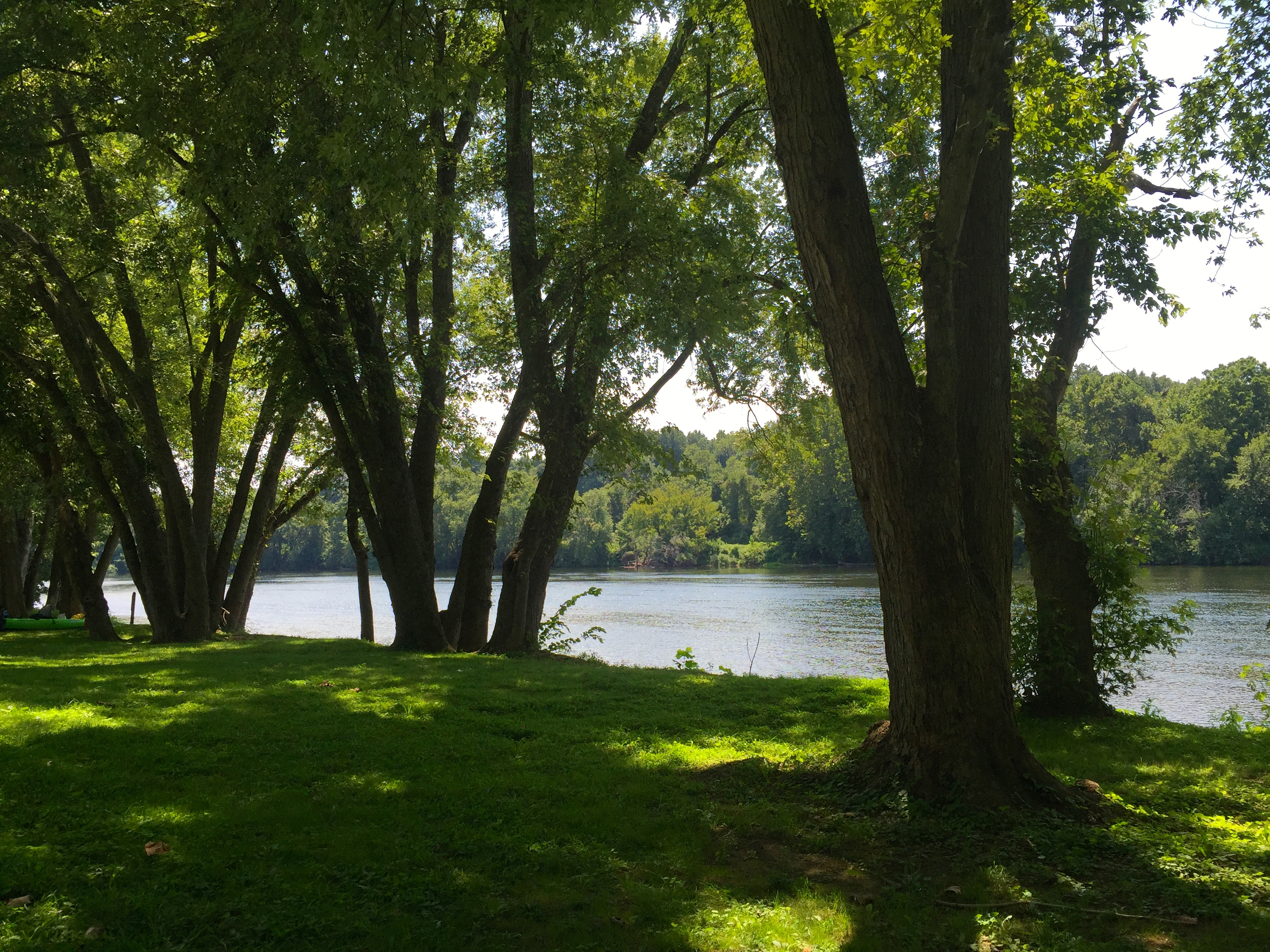
- James River State Park Riverfront Picnic Area

- Location within Virginia
- Location: Virginia
- Nearest city: Gladstone
- Coordinates: 37°37′23″N 78°48′35″W
- Area: 1,561 acres (6.32 km^{2})
- Governing body: Virginia Department of Conservation and Recreation

James River State Park is a state park located along the James River in Buckingham County, Virginia. Opened June 20, 1999, it preserves part of the route of the Kanawha Canal in addition to portions of the river.

One of the many attractions at James River State Park is the park's more than 130 acres (0.53 km^{2}) of native warm season grasses that blanket fields adjacent to the James River. These fields are maintained by periodic prescribed fire to facilitate growth of the native grasses. Very few areas of this size with warm season grasses still exist in the Eastern United States.

== See also ==
- List of Virginia state parks
