= Appomattox Historic District =

Historic district in Virginia, United States

- U.S. National Register of Historic Places
- U.S. Historic district
- Virginia Landmarks Register
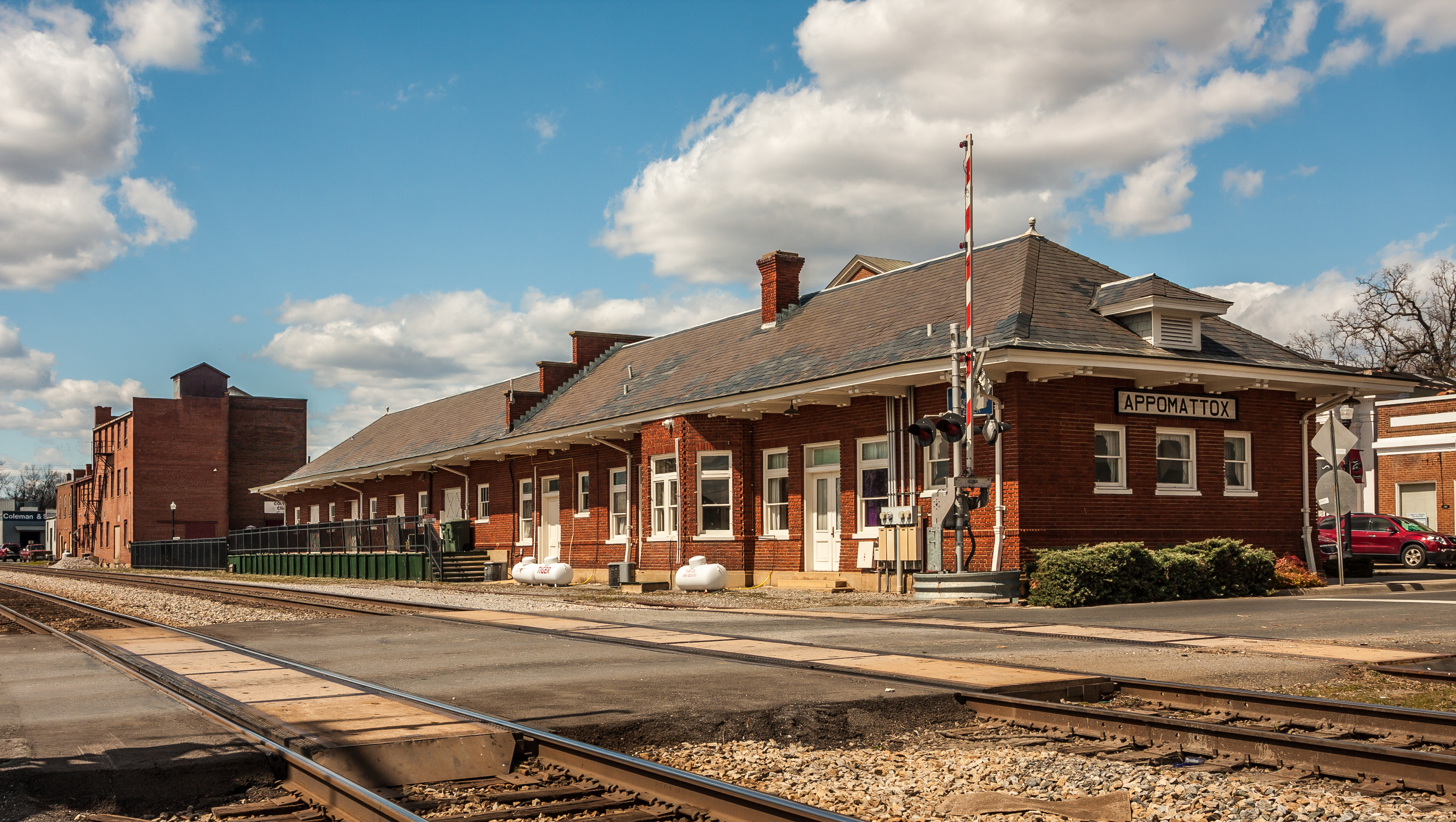
- Appomattox Depot (now Appomattox Visitor Center), Appomattox Historic District, March 2013

- Location within Virginia Location within the United States
- Location: Roughly along High, Church, Highland, VA 131, Linden, Lee Grant, Oakleigh and Evergreen, Appomattox, Virginia
- Coordinates: 37°21′10″N 78°49′40″W
- Area: 199 acres (81 ha)
- Built: 1845
- Architect: Robinson, Charles; et.al.
- Architectural style: Mid 19th Century Revival, Late Victorian
- NRHP reference No.: 02000510
- VLR No.: 165-5002

Significant dates
- Added to NRHP: May 16, 2002
- Designated VLR: September 12, 2001

The Appomattox Historic District national historic district located at Appomattox, Appomattox County, Virginia. It contains 297 contributing buildings, 6 contributing structures, and 3 contributing objects in Appomattox. It includes Courthouse Square, the commercial district surrounding the railroad tracks, the Appomattox depot (1923), and surrounding residential areas dating back to the 19th century. Notable buildings include the Appomattox Courthouse (1892), Appomattox County Jail (1895-1897), County Office Building (1940), Knickerbocker Hotel (1892), Bank of Appomattox (1906), Appomattox Middle School (1908), Appomattox Pentecostal Holiness Church (c. 1900), and "The Nebraska House" (1854, 1872, c. 1896).

The district was listed on the National Register of Historic Places in 2002. It is two miles southwest of the Appomattox Court House National Historical Park. Even though the park and the district share many of the same building names, for example, the court house and the jail, they are different buildings in different locations.
