= National Register of Historic Places listings in Appomattox County, Virginia =

Location of Appomattox County in Virginia

This is a list of the National Register of Historic Places listings in Appomattox County, Virginia.

This is intended to be a complete list of the properties and districts on the National Register of Historic Places in Appomattox County, Virginia, United States. The locations of National Register properties and districts for which the latitude and longitude coordinates are included below, may be seen in an online map.

There are 8 properties and districts listed on the National Register in the county.

This National Park Service list is complete through NPS recent listings posted March 6, 2026.

== Current listings ==
	Name on the Register	Image	Date listed	Location	City or town	Description
1	Appomattox River Bridge	Appomattox River Bridge	July 27, 2005 (#05000771)	State Route 24 over the Appomattox River; 37°22′55″N 78°47′22″W	Appomattox	Concrete bridge, each repeating pattern resembling that of the Confederate flag, on VA 24 over the Appomattox River
2	Appomattox Court House National Historical Park	Appomattox Court House National Historical Park	October 15, 1966 (#66000827)	3 miles (4.8 km) northeast of Appomattox on State Route 24; 37°22′39″N 78°47′46″W	Appomattox	
3	Appomattox Historic District	Appomattox Historic District	May 16, 2002 (#02000510)	Roughly along High, Church, Highland, State Route 131, Linden, Lee Grant, Oakleigh and Evergreen; 37°21′14″N 78°49′41″W	Appomattox	
4	Carver-Price School		February 21, 2024 (#100010001)	102 Carver Lane; 37°21′37″N 78°49′46″W	Appomattox	
5	Gilliam-Irving Farm	Gilliam-Irving Farm	April 27, 2018 (#100002374)	2012 Swan Rd. 37°17′08″N 78°39′37″W	Pamplin City	
6	Holiday Lake 4-H Educational Center	Holiday Lake 4-H Educational Center	March 15, 2011 (#11000091)	1267 4-H Camp Rd. 37°23′25″N 78°38′25″W	Appomattox	
7	Holliday Lake State Park	Holliday Lake State Park	October 31, 2012 (#12000903)	2759 State Park Rd. 37°23′50″N 78°38′24″W	Appomattox	
8	Pamplin Pipe Factory	Pamplin Pipe Factory	November 25, 1980 (#80004169)	U.S. Route 460 Business; 37°15′47″N 78°40′48″W	Pamplin City	Clay Pipe factory, now an archaeological site

== See also ==
- List of National Historic Landmarks in Virginia
- National Register of Historic Places listings in Virginia
