= Zoar =

Zoar may refer to:

- Zoara, a city mentioned in Genesis as part of the Biblical Pentapolis

== Places ==
Canada

- Zoar, Newfoundland and Labrador

England

- Zoar, Cornwall

South Africa

- Zoar, Western Cape

United States

- Zoar, Delaware
- Zoar, Indiana
- Zoar, Massachusetts
- Zoar, New York
- Zoar, Ohio, a village in Tuscarawas County, Ohio
- Zoar, Warren County, Ohio
- Zoar, Wisconsin

== Other ==
- Zoar (band), an experimental, gothic, ambient and classical (primarily instrumental) group from NYC
- Zoar (Aylett, Virginia), Virginia state forest named for a historic former plantation and listed on the National Register of Historic Places in King William County
- Zoar (Masters of the Universe), a fictional character in the Masters of the Universe franchise

== See also ==
- Zoar Bible Christian Church in the Penfield, South Australia
- Zoar Chapel in Canterbury, England
- Zoar State Forest in Virginia
- Zoar Valley in New York
- Soar (disambiguation) § Wales, Soar being the Welsh spelling of Zoar
