= Old Flat State Forest =

State forest in Virginia, USA

- IUCN category VI (protected area with sustainable use of natural resources)
- Location within Virginia
- Location: Grayson County, Virginia
- Nearest town: Whitetop
- Coordinates: 36°37′15″N 81°31′52″W
- Area: 320 acres (130 ha)
- Established: 2011
- Governing body: Virginia Department of Forestry

Old Flat State Forest is a 320-acre (130 ha) state forest in Grayson County, Virginia, near the town of Whitetop. The forest is used for research, education, and as a seed orchard.

== Landscape and topography ==
The majority of the forest lies above 4,000 feet (1,200 m) and reaches just over 5,000 feet (1,500 m) at its highest point. It has the highest elevation among Virginia's state forests and at the highest point constitutes a boreal forest-type environment with red spruce being in abundance, making it unique among Virginia's state forests. Descending in elevation, stands of spruce, yellow birch, and sugar maple are plentiful. At lower elevations, maple, northern red oak, birch, and yellow buckeye predominate the landscape.

== History ==
The land that comprises the state forest was acquired in a land swap between the Virginia Department of Forestry (VDOF) and the Virginia Department of Conservation and Recreation (DCR). Previously, the land was part of Grayson Highlands State Park. In exchange for the Old Flat parcel, the Virginia DOF traded land to the DCR for what is now Holliday Lake State Park.

VDOF acquired the parcel to create a seed orchard for Fraser fir trees, which are native to the highest elevations of the forest but had been declining in recent years. In addition to protecting the species, the orchard provides seeds to area Christmas tree producers.

== Facilities and access ==
The forest is open daily from dawn to dusk. There are no facilities on the property and the only access is by hiking in from adjoining Grayson Highlands State Park or through the George Washington and Jefferson National Forests. Activities are limited to hiking, wildlife watching, and photography. Visitors are asked to follow "Leave No Trace" principles.

== See also ==
- List of Virginia state forests
- List of Virginia state parks
