= Niday Place State Forest =

State forest in Virginia, United States

- IUCN category IV (habitat/species management area)
- Location within Virginia
- Location: Craig County, Virginia
- Coordinates: 37°23′14.9″N 80°23′36.2″W
- Area: 254 acres (103 ha)
- Established: 1989
- Governing body: Virginia Department of Forestry

Niday Place State Forest is a Virginia state forest located on John's Creek Mountain in Craig County. 254 acres (1.03 km^{2}) in size, it is a wildlife sanctuary and is used as an outdoor laboratory; it contains mainly mountain hardwoods. It is managed by Appomattox-Buckingham and Cumberland State Forests. Land for the state forest was donated by Anne H. Cutler of Williamsburg, Virginia.
