= Matthews State Forest =

State forest in Virginia, United States

- IUCN category IV (habitat/species management area)
- Location within Virginia
- Location: Grayson County, Virginia
- Nearest city: Galax
- Coordinates: 36°37′38.3″N 80°57′31.6″W
- Area: 566 acres (229 ha)
- Established: 1993
- Governing body: Virginia Department of Forestry
- Website: Matthews State Forest

Matthews State Forest is a Virginia state forest located in Grayson County, near the City of Galax. It is used for research into the American chestnut, as well as for demonstration of forestry management techniques; it serves as watershed protection and as a wildlife sanctuary, and has facilities for hiking. Hunting is permitted on its 566 acres (2.29 km^{2}).
