= Prince Edward-Gallion State Forest =

State forest in Virginia, United States

- IUCN category VI (protected area with sustainable use of natural resources)
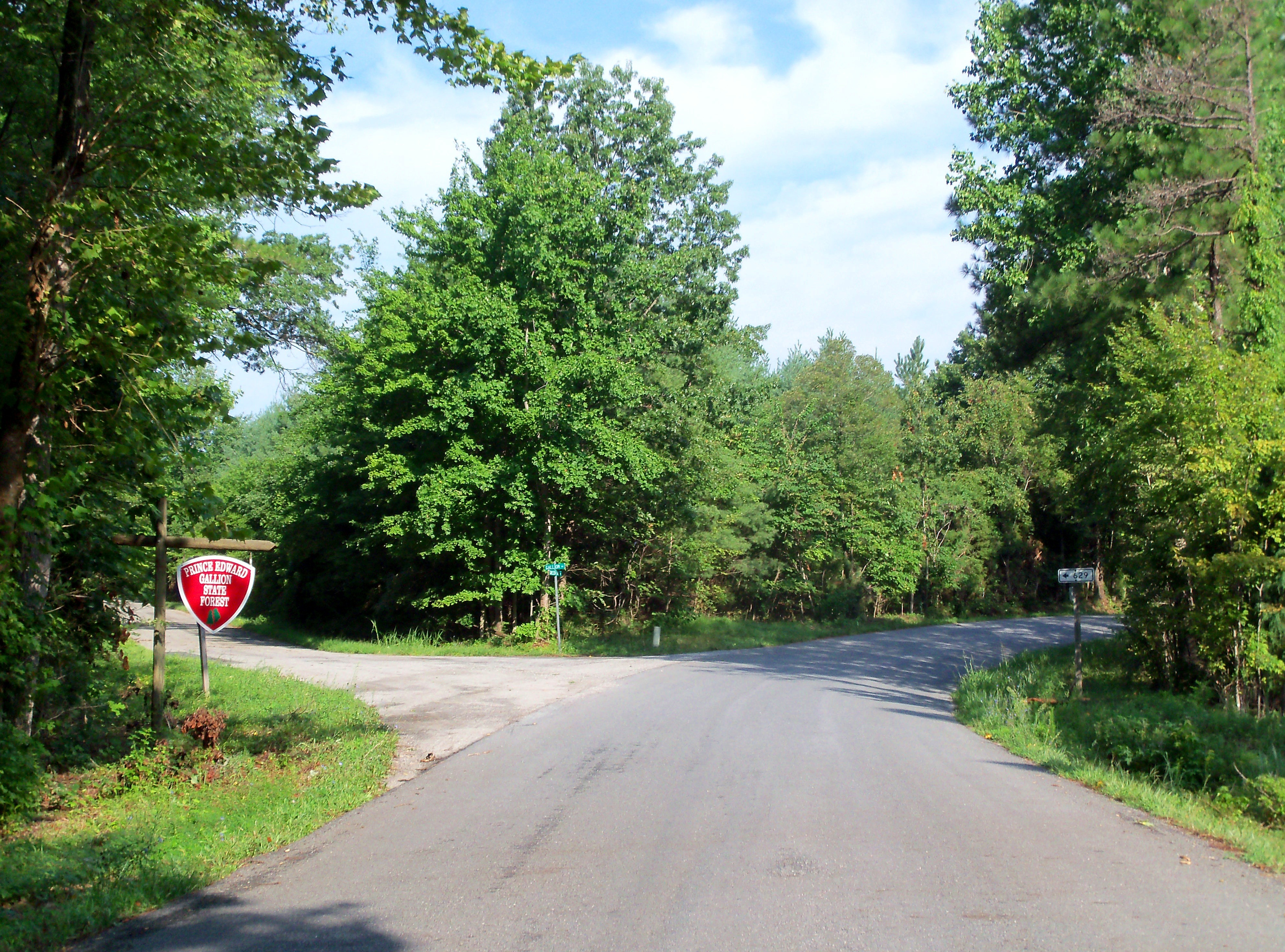
- Sign for the Prince Edward-Gallion State Forest off of VSR 696 north of US 360 in Green Bay
- Location: Prince Edward County, Virginia
- Nearest town: Green Bay
- Area: 6,496 acres (26.29 km^{2})
- Established: 1919
- Governing body: Virginia Department of Forestry

Prince Edward-Gallion State Forest is a state forest located in Prince Edward County, Virginia. Virginia's first state forest, it was founded upon land donated to the Commonwealth by its namesake, Emmett Dandridge Gallion. Its 6,496 acres (26.29 km^{2}) provide a number of recreational opportunities. Within its boundaries is Twin Lakes State Park.
