= Channels State Forest =

State forest in Virginia, United States

- IUCN category VI (protected area with sustainable use of natural resources)
- Location within Virginia
- Location: Washington and Russell counties, Virginia
- Nearest city: Abingdon
- Coordinates: 36°49′40.9″N 81°57′43.5″W
- Area: 4,836 acres (19.57 km^{2})
- Established: 2007
- Governing body: Virginia Department of Forestry
- Website: Channels State Forest

Channels State Forest is a 4,836-acre (19.57 km^{2}) state forest located in Washington and Russell counties, Virginia. The Channels Natural Area Preserve is located within the forest, which protects the Great Channels of Virginia, comprising slot canyons formed within 400-million-year-old sandstone outcroppings.

Channels State Forest is owned and maintained by the Virginia Department of Forestry. The forest is open to the public for hunting, horseback riding, and hiking; camping and motorized vehicles are prohibited. Some uses require visitors to possess a valid State Forest Use Permit.

== Images ==
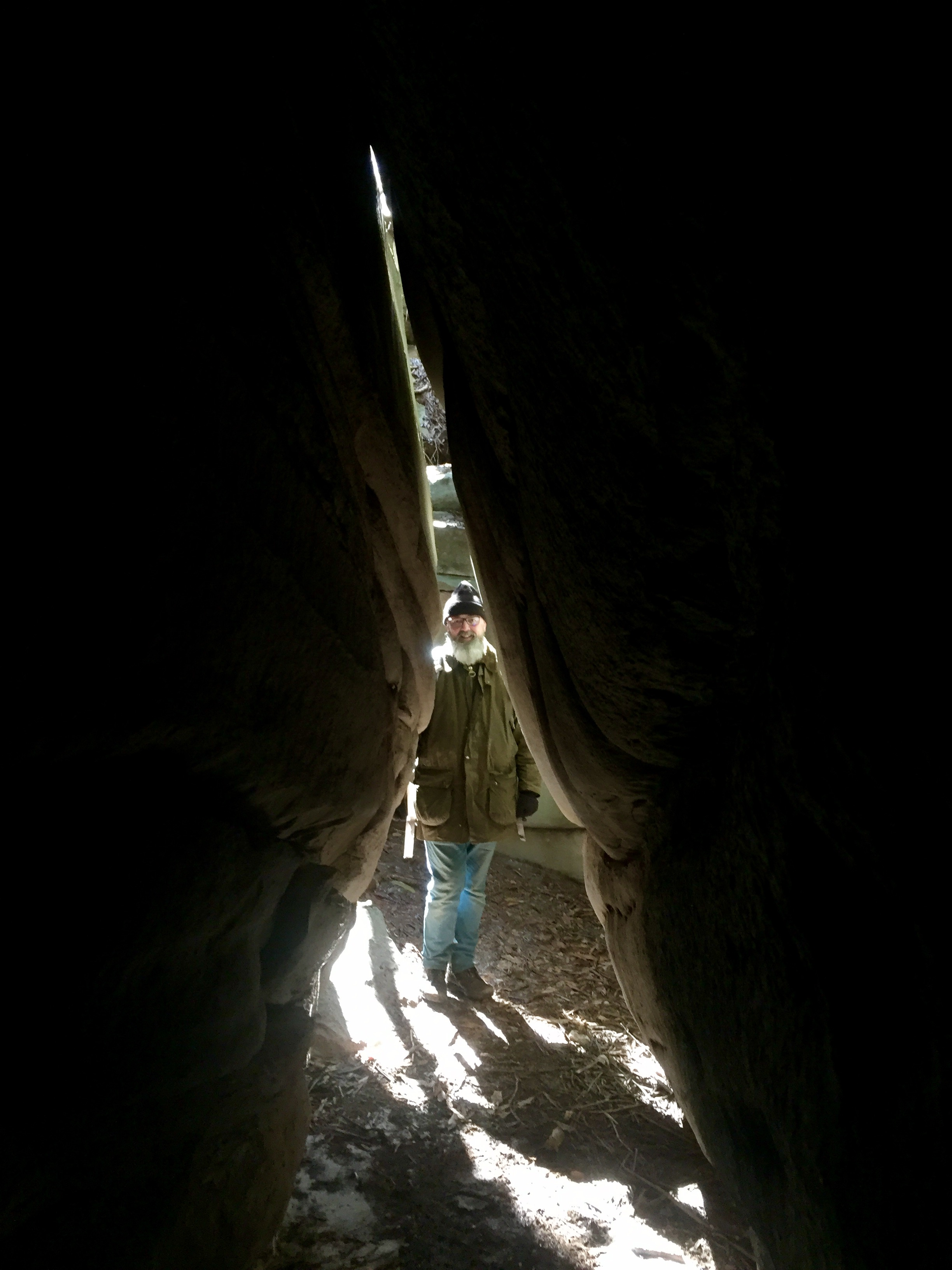
View within the Great Channels

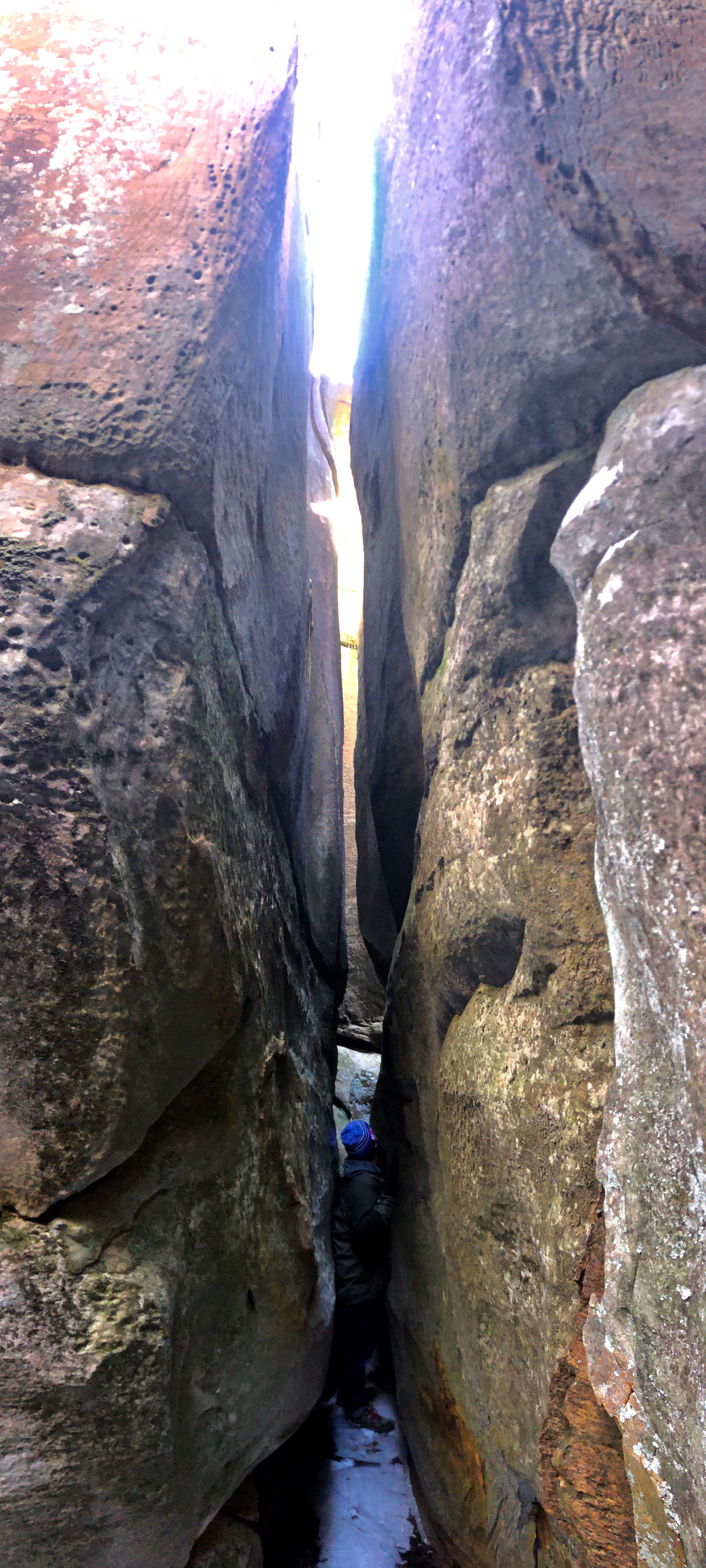
View within the Great Channels

== See also ==
- List of Virginia state forests
