= The Channels Natural Area Preserve =

Nature preserve in Virginia, US

- Location within Virginia Location within the United States
- Location: Washington and Russell counties, Virginia
- Coordinates: 36°52′0″N 81°59′36″W
- Area: 721 acres (2.92 km^{2})
- Governing body: Virginia Department of Forestry

The Channels Natural Area Preserve is a 721-acre (2.92 km^{2}) Natural Area Preserve located in Washington and Russell counties, Virginia. It was established in April 2008 to protect a number of significant natural communities and habitats, including high-elevation forests, rock outcrops, and cliffs.

The preserve's name derives from the eroded crevices and sandstone boulders clustered on a portion of the land.

The preserve is part of the Channels State Forest, managed by the Virginia Department of Forestry. The state forest and preserve are both open to the public, though an access permit is required for some activities on state forest lands.

== Images and video ==
Drone footage of The Channels Natural Area

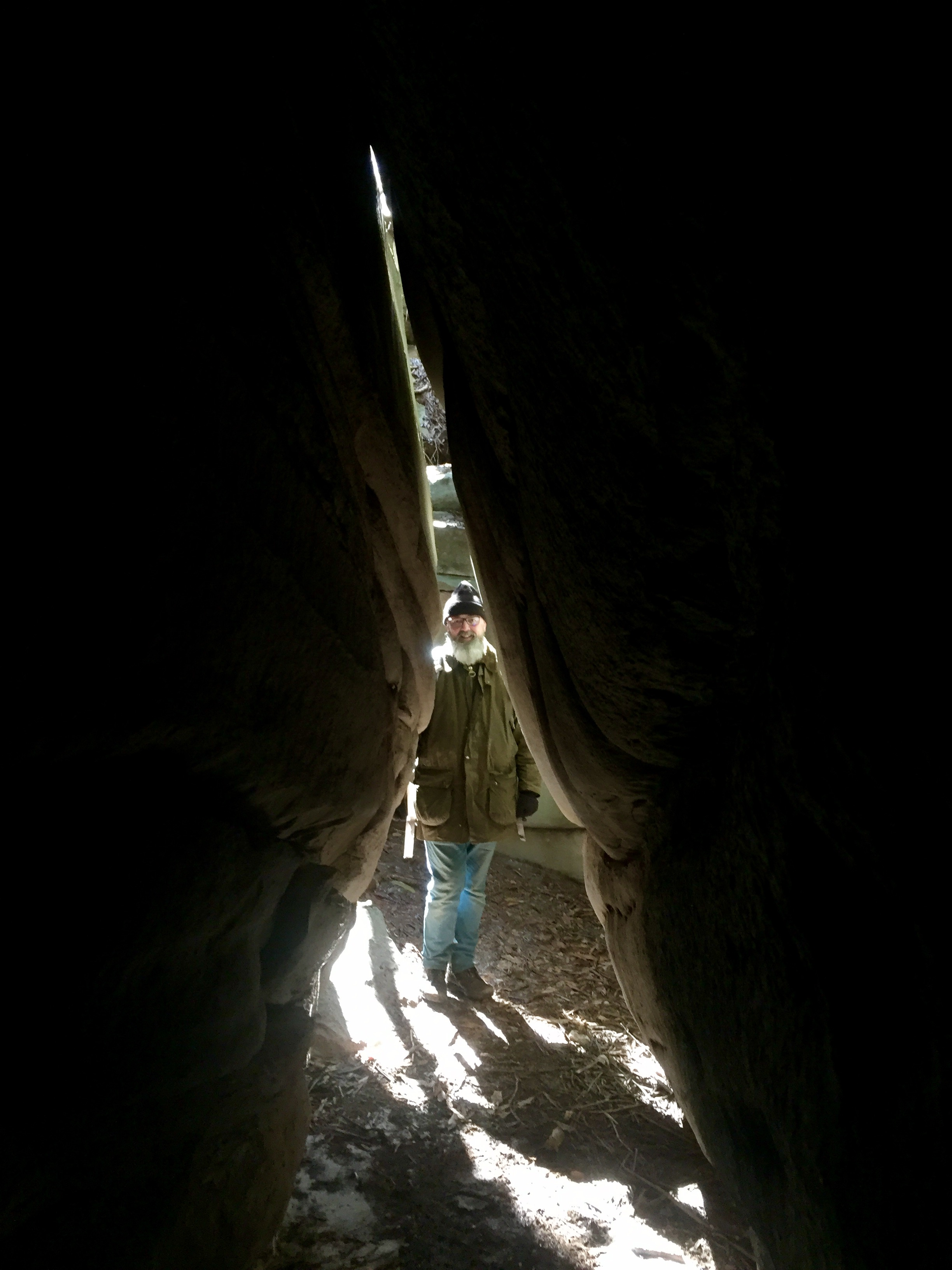
View within the Great Channels

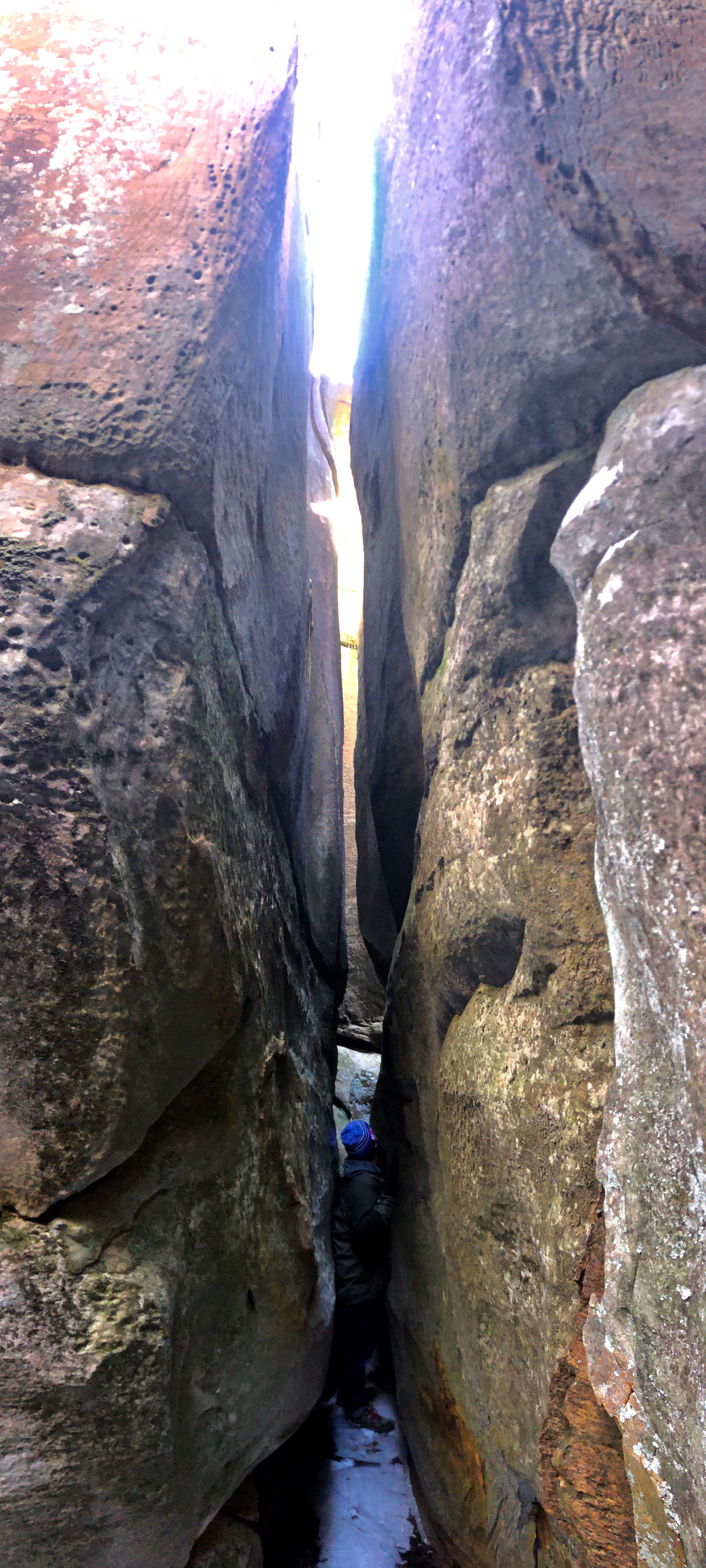
View within the Great Channels

== See also ==
- List of Virginia Natural Area Preserves
