= Browne State Forest =

State forest in Virginia, United States

- IUCN category VI (protected area with sustainable use of natural resources)
- Location within Virginia
- Location: Essex County, Virginia
- Nearest city: Tappahannock
- Coordinates: 37°47′25.5″N 76°46′49.7″W
- Area: 129 acres (52 ha)
- Established: 2005
- Governing body: Virginia Department of Forestry
- Website: Browne State Forest

Browne State Forest is a 129-acre (52 ha) state forest in Essex County, Virginia. It is located on Virginia's coastal plain, approximately 10 miles (16 km) southeast of Tappahannock, and 45 miles (72 km) northeast of Richmond.

Browne State Forest is owned and maintained by the Virginia Department of Forestry. The forest is open to the public for various recreational opportunities, including hunting, hiking, and mountain biking. Motorized vehicles are prohibited. Some uses may require visitors to possess a valid State Forest Use Permit.

== See also ==
- List of Virginia state forests
