= Charlotte State Forest =

State forest in Virginia, United States

- IUCN category VI (protected area with sustainable use of natural resources)
- Location within Virginia Location within the United States
- Location: Charlotte County, Virginia
- Nearest town: Drakes Branch
- Coordinates: 36°59′32″N 78°38′54″W
- Area: 5,688 acres (23.02 km^{2})
- Established: 2021
- Governing body: Virginia Department of Forestry

Charlotte State Forest is a 5,688-acre (23.02 km^{2}) state forest located in Charlotte County, Virginia near the town of Drakes Branch.

== History ==
The forest was formerly owned by Thomas B. Stanley, governor of the Commonwealth of Virginia from 1954 to 1958. Prior to its acquisition by The Conservation Fund in 2019, the land was owned by the Stanley Land and Lumber Corporation, which harvested timber to make furniture. It was transferred from The Conservation Fund to the Virginia Department of Forestry (VDOF) in late 2020 and officially dedicated as a state forest by Governor Ralph Northam on 4 November 2021.

== Description ==
Located off Saxkey Road, a Virginia Scenic Byway, the area includes portions along 13 miles of the Roanoke Creek and Wards Ford Creek, tributaries of the Roanoke River. The forest offers critical habitat for the endangered northern long-eared bat (Myotis septentrionalis) and the riparian areas provide undisturbed nesting and foraging habitat for waterfowl. Traditional outdoor recreation activities such as hiking, fishing, and birdwatching are available for visitors. The forest will continue to be sustainably harvested for timber.

== See also ==
- List of Virginia state forests
- List of Virginia state parks
