= Crawfords State Forest =

State forest in Virginia, United States

- IUCN category VI (protected area with sustainable use of natural resources)
- Location within Virginia Location within the United States
- Location: New Kent County, Virginia
- Coordinates: 37°26′55″N 77°05′02″W
- Area: 258 acres (104 ha)
- Established: 1995
- Governing body: Virginia Department of Forestry

Crawfords State Forest is a 258-acre (104 ha) state forest in New Kent County, Virginia. It is covered in mixed hardwoods, including bald cypress, tupelo, and loblolly pine.

Crawfords State Forest is owned and maintained by the Virginia Department of Forestry. The forest is open to the public for horseback riding and hiking. Hunting, camping, and motorized vehicles are prohibited. Some uses may require visitors to possess a valid State Forest Use Permit.

== See also ==
- List of Virginia state forests
