= Dragon Run State Forest =

State forest in Virginia, United States

- IUCN category VI (protected area with sustainable use of natural resources)
- Location within Virginia
- Location: King and Queen County, Virginia
- Coordinates: 37°42′34.8″N 76°48′26.9″W
- Area: 9,563 acres (38.70 km^{2})
- Established: 2007
- Governing body: Virginia Department of Forestry
- Website: Dragon Run State Forest

Dragon Run State Forest is a Virginia state forest located in King and Queen County. 9,563 acres (38.70 km^{2}) in size, it protects the Dragon Run Swamp while allowing for forest management. Hunting is permitted on the forest grounds.
