= List of Virginia state forests =

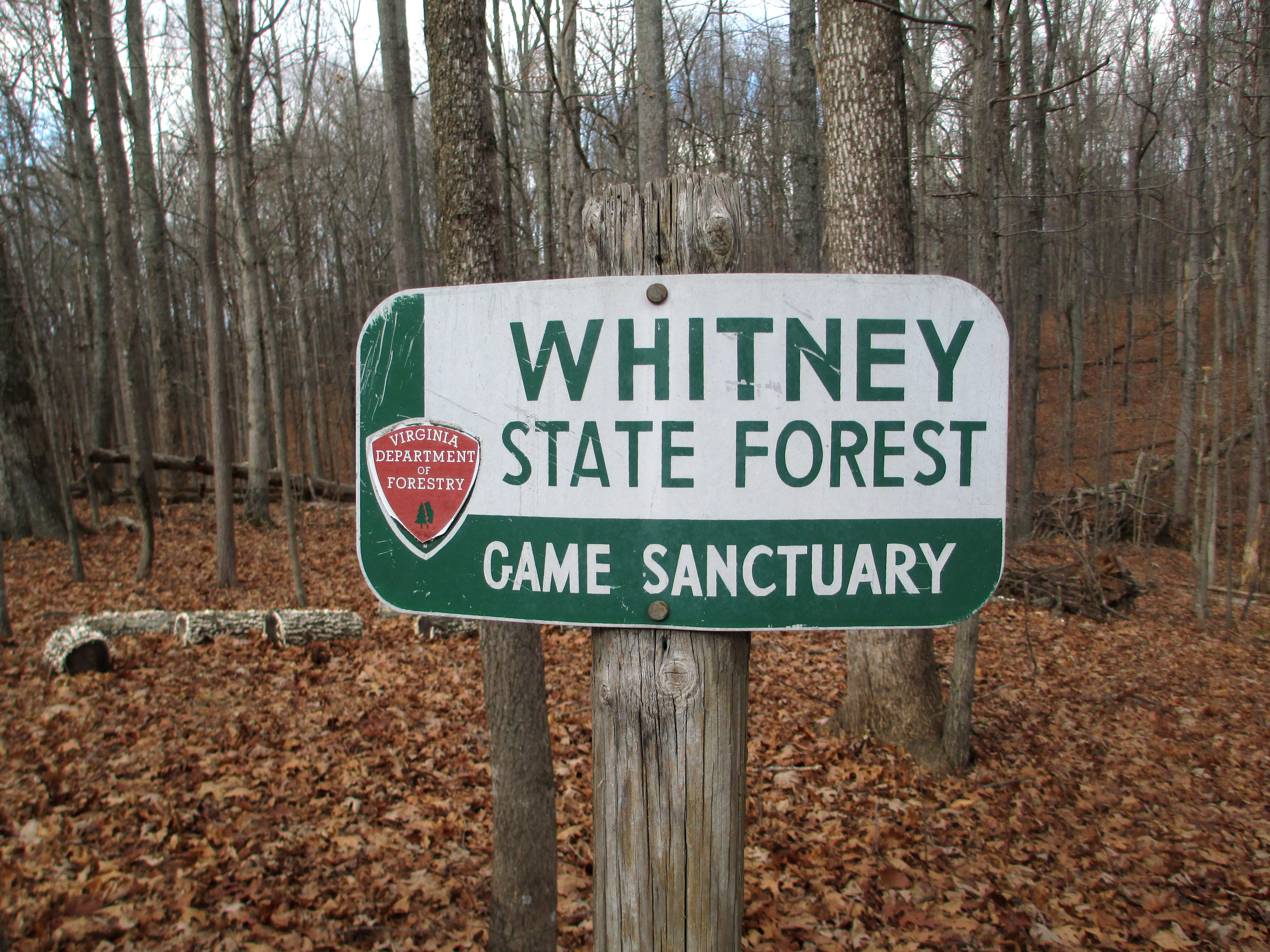
Property border sign at Whitney State Forest in Fauquier County, Virginia

The Virginia state forest system includes 26 state-managed forests covering a total of 75,200 acres (117.5 sq mi; 304.3 km^{2}). They are managed by the Virginia Department of Forestry.

The system was created to manage and maintain forests for wildlife, timber production, recreation, water quality, and aesthetics. The system receives no taxpayer funds, and is self-supported by the sale of forest products.

Most Virginia state forests are accessible to the public. Activities such as hiking, biking, horseback riding, hunting, and fishing are permitted in some state forests; permissible uses vary between individual state forests. Some activities require the purchase of a "State Forest Use Permit" for individuals ages 16 or older.

== State forests in the Commonwealth of Virginia ==
The following table lists Virginia's 26 state forests as of 2025.

Name	City, county, or counties	Size	Notes
Appomattox-Buckingham State Forest	Appomattox and Buckingham	19,513 acres (78.97 km^{2})	
Big Woods State Forest	Sussex	2,403 acres (9.72 km^{2})	
Bourassa State Forest	Bedford	288 acres (1.17 km^{2})	
Browne State Forest	Essex	128 acres (0.52 km^{2})	
Channels State Forest	Washington and Russell	4,836 acres (19.57 km^{2})	
Charlotte State Forest	Charlotte	5,688 acres (23.02 km^{2})	Hunting not allowed during 2021 Season.
Chesterfield State Forest	Chesterfield	440 acres (1.8 km^{2})	
Chilton Woods State Forest	Lancaster	397 acres (1.61 km^{2})	
Conway-Robinson Memorial State Forest	Prince William	444 acres (1.80 km^{2})	
Crawfords State Forest	New Kent County	258 acres (1.04 km^{2})	
Cumberland State Forest	Cumberland	16,222 acres (65.65 km^{2})	
Devil's Backbone State Forest	Shenandoah	517 acres (2.09 km^{2})	Public access not permitted.
Dragon Run State Forest	King and Queen	9,563 acres (38.70 km^{2})	
First Mountain State Forest	Rockingham	573 acres (2.32 km^{2})	
Hawks State Forest	Carroll	121 acres (0.49 km^{2})	
Lesesne State Forest	Nelson	422 acres (1.71 km^{2})	
Matthews State Forest	Grayson	566 acres (2.29 km^{2})	
Moore's Creek State Forest	Rockbridge	2,353 acres (9.52 km^{2})	
Niday Place State Forest	Craig	254 acres (1.03 km^{2})	
Old Flat State Forest	Grayson	320 acres (1.3 km^{2})	
Paul State Forest	Rockingham	173 acres (0.70 km^{2})	
Prince Edward-Gallion State Forest	Prince Edward	6,461 acres (26.15 km^{2})	
Sandy Point State Forest	King William	2,043 acres (8.27 km^{2})	
South Quay State Forest	Suffolk	266 acres (1.08 km^{2})	
Whitney State Forest	Fauquier	148 acres (0.60 km^{2})	
Zoar State Forest	King William	378 acres (1.53 km^{2})	

== See also ==
- List of national forests of the United States
- List of Virginia state parks
- List of Virginia Natural Area Preserves
- List of Virginia Wildlife Management Areas
