= Devil's Backbone =

Devil's Backbone may refer to:

== Places ==
- Devil's Backbone (rock formation), a rock formation near Charlestown, Indiana
- Devils Backbone (Highland County, Virginia), a small mountain in Highland County, Virginia
- Devil's Backbone State Forest, a state forest located in Shenandoah County, Virginia
- Devils Backbone Wilderness, a protected wilderness area in Ozark County, Missouri
- A ridge in the Ouachita Mountains, in Arkansas
- A ridge near Mount San Antonio in the San Gabriel Mountains, in California
- A region in Texas Hill Country

== Plants ==
- Euphorbia tithymaloides, the so-called "Redbird cactus" which is actually a spurge
- Kalanchoe daigremontiana, a bryophyllum
- Cissus quadrangularis, a perennial plant of the grape family

== Other uses ==
- The Devil's Backbone (El espinazo del diablo), a 2001 Spanish film

== See also ==
- Battle of Devil's Backbone, a battle in the American Civil War
- Devils Backbone Brewing Company, a brewpub located in Roseland, Virginia
- Spina bifida, a birth defect
