= Conway Robinson State Forest =

State forest in Virginia, United States

- IUCN category VI (protected area with sustainable use of natural resources)
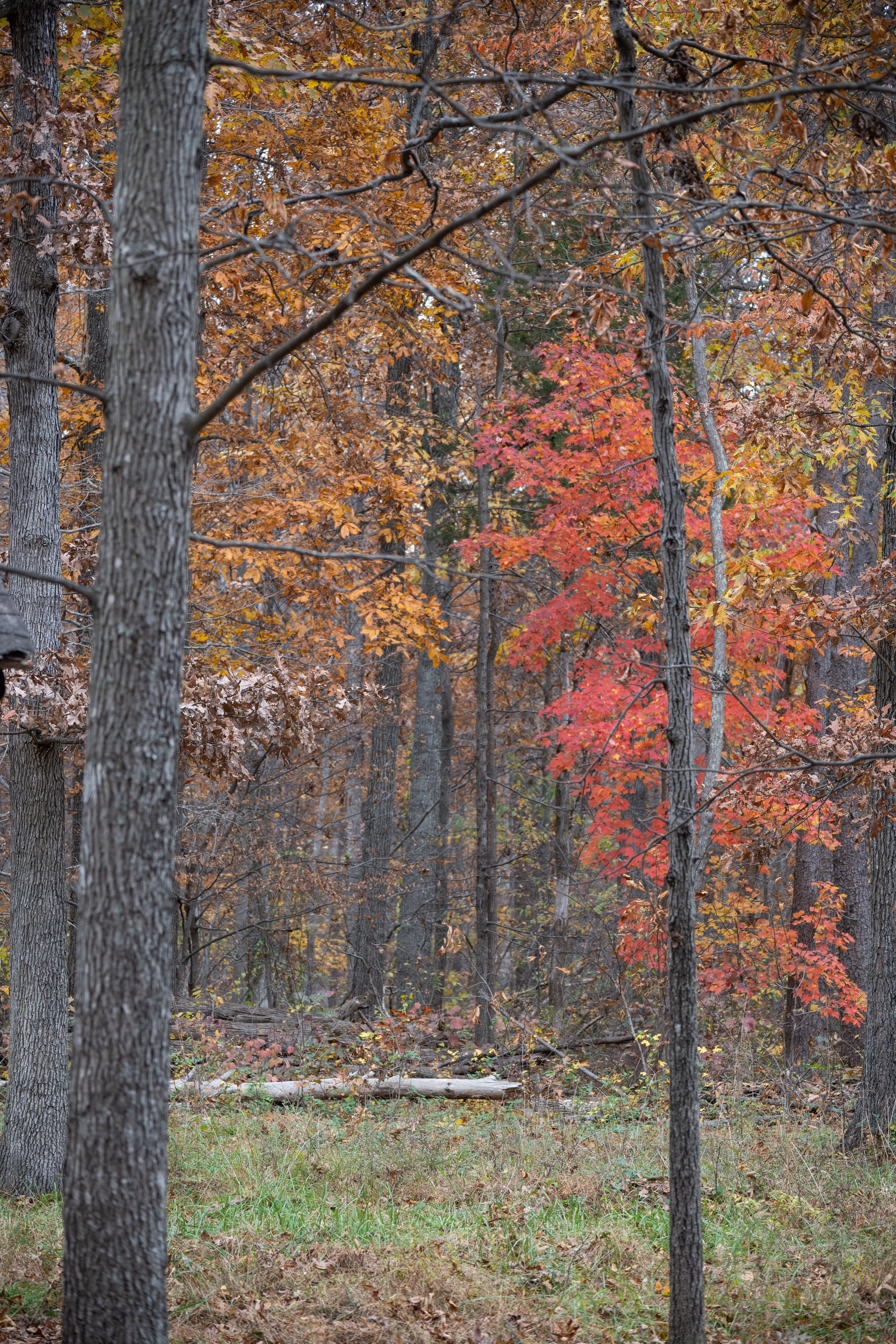
- Conway Robinson State Forest in autumn

- Location within Virginia Location within the United States
- Location: Prince William County, Virginia
- Coordinates: 38°48′12.6″N 77°35′16.7″W
- Area: 444 acres (180 ha)
- Established: February 1938
- Governing body: Virginia Department of Forestry

Conway Robinson State Forest is a state forest in Prince William County, Virginia, near Manassas National Battlefield Park. It serves as a wildflower and wildlife sanctuary. The forest covers 444 acres (180 ha) of pine plantation, mixed pine, and old-growth hardwoods and is one of the largest tracts of undeveloped land owned by the Commonwealth in Northern Virginia.

== History ==
The Conway Robinson State Forest was named after Conway Robinson, a 19th-century lawyer, historian, and author from the Commonwealth of Virginia. He is most famous for having argued approximately 100 cases before the Supreme Court of the United States and being a founding member of the Virginia Historical Society. The Conway Robinson Park Memorial Association sought to perpetuate the memory of him as a distinguished Virginian through the development of a state forest, which was eventually established in February 1938.

== Description ==
The Conway Robinson State Forest is owned and maintained by the Virginia Department of Forestry. Forest management activities include tree planting and harvesting, as well as actions to enhance water quality, aesthetics and wildlife. Management is guided by the original deed, which limits tree removal except for the improvement of the forest's resources and habitat. In addition, the forest provides space for research projects by college or university students, tours and demonstrations, and other educational activities.

=== Public use and access ===
The forest serves as a recreation area with various uses. It features approximately 5.1 miles (8.2 km) of multi-use trails, which may be used for hiking, mountain biking, trail riding, and geocaching. The forest is open to the public for recreation activities during daylight hours. Camping and motorized vehicles are prohibited.

A State Forest Use Permit is required for visitors aged 16 or older to ride horses, ride mountain bikes, hunt, and trap. A State Forest Use Permit is not required for those using the forest for walking or hiking. A valid Virginia hunting license in addition to a State Forest Permit is required for hunting or trapping within the forest.

== See also ==
- List of Virginia state forests
