= Bourassa State Forest =

State forest in Virginia, United States

- IUCN category VI (protected area with sustainable use of natural resources)
- Location within Virginia
- Location: Bedford County, Virginia
- Coordinates: 37°4′45″N 79°31′26″W
- Area: 288 acres (117 ha)
- Governing body: Virginia Department of Forestry

Bourassa State Forest is a 288-acre (117 ha) state forest located in Bedford County, Virginia, north of Smith Mountain Lake. It is used primarily for timber production, as an outdoor lab, and as a wildlife sanctuary. The forest is adjacent to the Smith Mountain Cooperative Wildlife Management Area.

Bourassa State Forest is owned and maintained by the Virginia Department of Forestry. It is open to the public for horseback riding and hiking; hunting, camping, and motorized vehicles are prohibited. Some uses may require visitors to possess a valid State Forest Use Permit.

== See also ==
- List of Virginia state forests
- List of Virginia state parks
