= Soar =

Soar or SOAR may refer to:

== Acronyms ==
- 160th Special Operations Aviation Regiment (Airborne), US Army regiment
- Safe operating area ratings in electronics
- Security orchestration, automation, and response, a set of applications that collect data from disparate sources and automatically respond to security events
- Southern Astrophysical Research Telescope, optical and near-infrared telescope located on Cerro Pachón, Chile
- Speak Out, Act, Reclaim, sex trafficking victims rights organisation
- Special Operations Assault Rifle, primary assault rifle for the special forces unit of the Philippine National Police
- Student orientation and Registration
- Surgical Outcomes Analysis and Research, a research collaborative in the Beth Israel Deaconess Medical Center

== Geography ==
=== Scotland ===
- Intu Braehead Soar, a shopping centre in Braehead, Renfrewshire

=== England ===
- River Soar, a river in Leicestershire/Midlands England
- Soar, South Hams, a settlement in South Hams
- Old Soar Manor, an English Heritage property near Plaxtol, Kent

=== Wales ===
- Soar, Anglesey
- Soar, Gwynedd
- Soar, Ceredigion, location of chapel near Llangynfelyn
- Soar, Powys, former village

==== Chapels ====
- Soar Chapel, Cwmaman, Rhondda Cynon Taf
- Soar Chapel, Hirwaun, Rhondda Cynon Taf
- Soar Chapel, Llanelli, Carmarthenshire
- Soar Chapel, Llwydcoed, Rhondda Cynon Taf
- Soar y mynydd, Llanddewi Brefi, Ceredigion
- Canolfan Soar (arts centre in a former chapel), Merthyr Tydfil

== Music ==
- Soar, a 1991 album by the American band Samiam
- Soar (Mari Hamada album), 2023
- S.O.A.R. (Devour The Day album), 2016
- "Soar", a song by Christina Aguilera from the album Stripped (2002)
- "Soar", a 2026 single by Takane Lui

== Other uses ==
- Soar (cognitive architecture), a symbolic cognitive architecture
- SOAR (spaceplane), air-space system under development for launch of satellites and suborbital space tourism from Swiss Space Systems company, Switzerland

== See also ==
- Soaring (disambiguation)
- Soares, a surname
- Șoarș, a commune in Brașov County, Romania
- Zoar (disambiguation), of which Soar is the Welsh spelling
