= Lesesne State Forest =

State forest in Virginia, United States

- IUCN category VI (protected area with sustainable use of natural resources)
- Location within Virginia
- Location: Nelson County, Virginia
- Nearest town: Roseland
- Coordinates: 37°50′20.3″N 78°58′16.6″W
- Area: 422 acres (171 ha)
- Established: 1968
- Governing body: Virginia Department of Forestry
- Website: Lesesne State Forest

Lesesne State Forest is a Virginia state forest located in Nelson County. Its 422 acres (1.71 km^{2}) are dedicated to the preservation of the American chestnut and to wildlife management activities. It is open to the public during daylight hours.
