= Chilton Woods State Forest =

State forest in Virginia, United States

- IUCN category VI (protected area with sustainable use of natural resources)
- Location within Virginia
- Location: Lancaster County, Virginia
- Coordinates: 37°49′14″N 76°31′39″W
- Area: 397 acres (161 ha)
- Established: 2000
- Governing body: Virginia Department of Forestry

Chilton Woods State Forest is a 397-acre (161 ha) state forest located on the Northern Neck in Lancaster County, Virginia, near the town of Warsaw.

== History ==
Chilton Woods State Forest was formed in July 2000 after Catherine B. Chilton turned the land over to state control; the Virginia Department of Forestry had aided her and her husband when they took control of the property in 1954. Upon his death in 1973, Mr. Chilton's will left the land to his wife, with the stipulation that she turn it over to the Commonwealth upon her death.

== Description ==
The forest includes Lancaster Creek and the Corrotoman River, both of which are tributaries of the Rappahannock River. Most of the forest's trees are loblolly pine, with areas of mixed pine and hardwoods. Herbaceous plants within the forest include the showy orchis and pink lady's slipper. Management of the forest focuses on timber production and enhancement of wildlife habitat, in addition to providing space for public recreation such as hiking and birdwatching.

=== Public use and access ===
The forest is open to the public for horseback riding and hiking; hunting is limited to archery and black powder rifle use only. Camping and motorized vehicles are prohibited. Some uses may require visitors to possess a valid State Forest Use Permit.

== See also ==
- List of Virginia state forests
