= Hawks State Forest =

State forest in Virginia, United States

- IUCN category VI (protected area with sustainable use of natural resources)
- Location within Virginia Location within the United States
- Location: Carroll County, Virginia
- Nearest city: Lambsburg, Virginia
- Coordinates: 36°36′12″N 80°46′20″W
- Area: 121 acres (49 ha)
- Established: 1996
- Governing body: Virginia Department of Forestry

Hawks State Forest is a state forest in Carroll County, Virginia. It offers watershed protection and wildlife habitat.
