= First Mountain State Forest =

State forest in Virginia, United States

- IUCN category VI (protected area with sustainable use of natural resources)
- Location within Virginia
- Location: Rockingham County, Virginia
- Nearest city: Harrisonburg, VA
- Coordinates: 38°25′56.5″N 78°40′35.8″W
- Area: 573.4 acres (232.0 ha)
- Established: October 2019
- Governing body: Virginia Department of Forestry
- Website: First Mountain State Forest

First Mountain State Forest is a state forest located in Rockingham County, Virginia northwest of the town of Elkton. The land is adjoined with George Washington and Jefferson National Forests. The land was dedicated as the 25th state forest by Governor Ralph Northam on 7 October 2019.

== History ==
The property, formerly known as Boone's Run Farm, was acquired in 2019 from the Dofflemyer Family, with the majority of the funding coming from the DuPont natural resource damages and restoration settlement. Additional funding was provided by the Virginia Department of Forestry (VDOF) and the Dofflemyer Family. The Dofflemyer family had operated the property for generations as a tree farm.

== Description ==
The 573-acre (2.32 km^{2}) property is situated on the southeast slope of First Mountain at the southern end of the Massanutten Mountain range and consists of pine and hardwood forest, as well as open meadows. There are over 21,700 feet of stream frontage on approximately eight different streams, including Boone Run, which empties into the south fork of the Shenandoah River and is well suited for brook trout fishing. The property, which continues to operate as a tree farm, is also open for hiking and mountain biking. There are no facilities on the property.

== See also ==
- List of Virginia state forests
