= Collierstown, Virginia =

- Unincorporated community
- Location within Virginia
- Coordinates: 37°47′8″N 79°35′21″W
- Country: United States
- State: Virginia
- County: Rockbridge
- Time zone: UTC−5 (Eastern (EST))
  - Summer (DST): UTC−4 (EDT)
- ZIP code: 24450
- FIPS code: 18288
- GNIS feature ID: 1492794

Collierstown is an unincorporated community in Rockbridge County, Virginia, United States. Collierstown is located in the 540 area code. As of 2023, there are 654 registered voters in the area.

== Geography ==
Collierstown is located in Rockbridge County in the Shenandoah Valley on the western edge of the Commonwealth of Virginia. The elevation of Collierstown is 1,243 feet. Collierstown appears on the Collierstown U.S. Geological Survey Map.

Collierstown is approximately eight miles from the independent city of Lexington. Virginia State Route 251, known as Collierstown Road, connects the city of Lexington to Collierstown. The state highway heads southeastward as two-lane undivided Collierstown Road along Colliers Creek.

== History ==
According to the Virginia Department of Historic Resources, the Collierstown area was first settled in the 1700s by Presbyterians who build a log fort for a school and place of worship.

After the Revolutionary War, the local community built a stone church known as the Oxford church, which is one of the American Presbyterian and Reformed Historical Sites registered by the Presbyterian Historical Society.

Collierstown was an agricultural community with various farms. Collierstown is included in the 1851 list of U.S. Post Offices.

In the November 1860 presidential election, there were a total of 162 white male voters in Collierstown. Abraham Lincoln did not receive any votes in Collierstown, and the majority voted for John C. Breckinridge and John Bell.

Collierstown was included in the Business Atlas and Shippers' Guide of 1895. In the same year, the Rand McNally Atlas listed Collierstown with a total population of 376.

The Rockbridge Telephone Company was headquartered in Collierstown during the 20th century, in addition to a general store.

Local Collierstown residents served in the Revolutionary War, Civil War, World War I, and World War II.

== Local sites ==
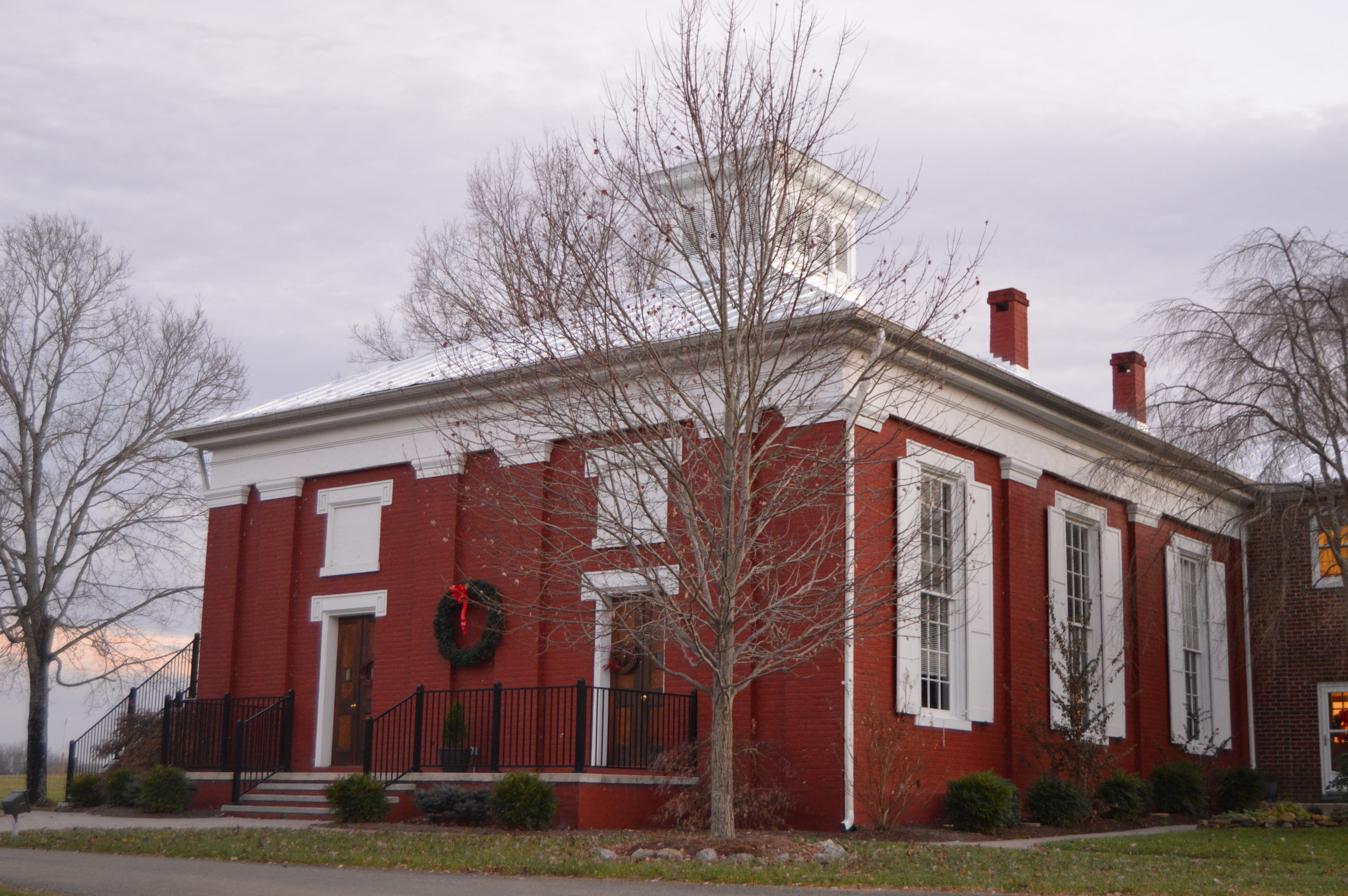
Collierstown Presbyterian Church, located on Turnpike Road in Collierstown.

There are two churches in Collierstown, including Collierstown Presbyterian Church and Collierstown Baptist Church. There are seven cemeteries in Collierstown. The Collierstown precinct is a designated voting precinct in Rockbridge County.

Rockbridge County operates a staffed solid waste collection and management site in Collierstown.

The Lake A. Willis Robertson campground and park and Moore's Creek State Forest are located in the vicinity of Collierstown.

== In popular culture ==
The Middle Ordovician "Collierstown Limestone" was discovered in a rock formation in the Collierstown area in the 1940s and is named for the region.

Poet R.M. Tuttle wrote a poem in tribute to Collierstown in his 1905 book of poems.
