= Virginia Outdoors Foundation =

The Virginia Outdoors Foundation is a quasi-state agency formed by the Virginia General Assembly in 1966 "to promote the preservation of open space lands and to encourage private gifts of money, securities, land or other property to preserve the natural, scenic, historic, open-space and recreational areas of the Commonwealth." As of 2017, it owns 3,366 acres (13.62 km^{2}) of public land and holds and manages conservation easements on approximately 801,077 acres (1,251.68 sq mi; 3,241.84 km^{2}) of private land.

Members of the Virginia Outdoors Foundation's Board of Trustees are appointed by the Virginia governor for four-year staggered terms. The sitting governor appoints a chairman from among the seven trustees.

Among the properties that the Virginia Outdoors Foundation currently protects through conservation easements are Carvins Cove Natural Reserve and Mill Mountain owned by the City of Roanoke, Wildwood Park in the City of Radford, Shirley Plantation in Charles City County, James Madison's Montpelier in Orange County, the Hermitage Museum and Gardens in the City of Norfolk, and more than 4,000 acres (16 km^{2}) of land along the Rappahannock River owned by the City of Fredericksburg. In cooperation with the Virginia Department of Game and Inland Fisheries, the Virginia Outdoors Foundation also helps manage the 4,996-acre (20.22 km^{2}) Smith Mountain Cooperative Wildlife Management Area, established via easement on land owned by Appalachian Power along Smith Mountain Lake.

As of 2008, twenty percent of the land in Clarke County, Virginia was covered by conservation easements.
