= Zoar State Forest =

State forest in Virginia, United States

- IUCN category VI (protected area with sustainable use of natural resources)
- Location within Virginia
- Location: King William County, Virginia
- Nearest town: Aylett
- Coordinates: 37°47′38″N 77°6′48″W
- Area: 378 acres (153 ha)
- Established: 1987
- Governing body: Virginia Department of Forestry

Zoar State Forest is a state forest located in King William County, Virginia, near the town of Aylett. It is used to grow timber and agricultural crops, maintain habitat for various species of wildlife, and to provide educational and recreational opportunities. All state forests are managed by the VDOF for multiple-use purposes, including watershed protection, recreation, timber production, fishing, and applied forest research. The state forests are self-supporting (no taxes are used to operate the system). In addition, one-fourth of all income is returned to King William County. Income is received from the sale of forest products.

The property was originally part of a large estate belonging to William Aylett, and was purchased in 1782 by one Robert Pollard. He built a frame house on the land, calling it Mount Zoar. It was partially destroyed by an 1851 fire, and rebuilt using brick by Pollard's son. Another fire between 1884 and 1885 destroyed the structure, as well as its contents. The present house was built in 1890; today it is on the National Register of Historic Places as Zoar. The 378-acre (1.53 km^{2}) forest was donated to the Virginia Department of Forestry in 1987. Today, the house and its outbuildings support field offices for area foresters helping landowners in both King William and King and Queen counties.

== See also ==
- List of Virginia state forests
- List of Virginia state parks
