= Smith Mountain Cooperative Wildlife Management Area =

Protected area of Virginia, United States

- Location within Virginia Location within the United States
- Location: Bedford and Pittsylvania counties, Virginia
- Coordinates: 37°02′02″N 79°32′38″W
- Area: 4,996 acres (20.22 km^{2})
- Established: January 2009
- Governing body: Virginia Department of Game and Inland Fisheries; Virginia Outdoors Foundation

Smith Mountain Cooperative Wildlife Management Area is a 4,996-acre (20.22 km^{2}) Wildlife Management Area (WMA) in Bedford and Pittsylvania counties, Virginia. Located on the shores of Smith Mountain Lake, the WMA is owned by Appalachian Power and cooperatively managed by the Virginia Department of Game and Inland Fisheries and the Virginia Outdoors Foundation through a conservation easement that permits public access.

== History ==
The area was established in January 2009 when a conservation easement was donated by Appalachian Power to the Virginia Department of Game and Inland Fisheries and the Virginia Outdoors Foundation. The land was first acquired by Appalachian Power in the 1950s during the construction of the Smith Mountain Dam hydroelectric project.

== Description ==
The majority of Smith Mountain Cooperative WMA (4,022 acres [16.28 km^{2}]) is located in Pittsylvania County, with the remainder (973 acres [3.94 km^{2}]) in Bedford County. The WMA covers ten miles (16 km) of Smith Mountain Lake's southeastern shoreline on either side of Smith Mountain Dam, and comprises the majority of Smith Mountain. It is adjacent to Bourassa State Forest.

The WMA is heavily forested, and includes elevations ranging from 800 to 2,000 feet (240 to 610 m). Game animals found within the area include deer, bear, turkey, squirrels, and raccoons. Several rare species and a rare type of natural community are also found within the WMA.

Smith Mountain Cooperative WMA is open to the public for hunting, trapping, fishing, hiking, horseback riding, and primitive camping. Access for persons 17 years of age or older requires a valid hunting or fishing permit, or a WMA access permit.

== See also ==
- List of Virginia Wildlife Management Areas
