= Moore's Creek State Forest =

State forest in Virginia, United States

- IUCN category VI (protected area with sustainable use of natural resources)
- Location within Virginia
- Location: Rockbridge County, Virginia
- Nearest city: Lexington
- Coordinates: 37°44′54″N 79°39′24″W
- Area: 2,353 acres (9.52 km^{2})
- Established: 2010
- Governing body: Virginia Department of Forestry

Moore's Creek State Forest is a 2,353-acre state forest in Rockbridge County, Virginia. Access to the trailhead is via US Forest Service road off State Route 612 in southwestern Rockbridge County.

== See also ==
- List of Virginia state forests
