= Conway Robinson =

American politician (1805–1884)

Member of the Virginia House of Delegates from the Richmond City district
- In office January 12, 1852 – December 4, 1853 Serving with William C. Carrington, William F. Butler, Joseph R. Anderson, A. Judson Crane
- Preceded by: Thomas P. August
- Succeeded by: Henry K. Ellyson

Personal details
- Born: September 15, 1805 Richmond, Virginia, U.S.
- Died: January 30, 1884 (aged 78) Philadelphia, Pennsylvania, U.S.
- Resting place: Hollywood Cemetery
- Party: Democratic
- Spouse: Mary Susan Selden Leigh

Conway Robinson (September 15, 1805 – January 30, 1884) was a Virginia lawyer, writer, slaveholder and politician aligned with the Democratic Party who represented Richmond, Virginia during the 1852 to 1853 session of the Virginia House of Delegates. He also served many years on Richmond's City Council and like his brother Moncure Robinson headed the Richmond, Fredericksburg and Petersburg Railroad.

== Early and family life ==
Conway Robinson was born in Richmond, Virginia to Agnes Conway Moncure (1780 – November 15, 1862), whose husband, John Robinson III (February 13, 1773 – April 26, 1850), was clerk and later judge of the circuit court. Both parents were from the First Families of Virginia. The Robinson family presence in Virginia dates to 1688 at New Charles Parish. His mother's father, Peyton Conway, was the clerk of the court in Stafford County, Virginia, and her family also descended from Scots immigrant—Rev. John Moncure (1709-1764), longtime priest of Aquia parish and friend of founding fathers George Washington, George Mason and others. His brothers were Moncure, Cary, Edwin, Conway, Eustace and Moore Robinson, sisters Octavia (1813? – 1880?) and Cornelia.

He married Mary Susan Selden, daughter of Benjamin Watkins Leigh, who bore several children.

== Career ==
Admitted to the Virginia bar, Robinson would argue 100 cases before the Supreme Court, as well as publish many treatises. In the 1840 federal census, a free black woman lived in his household, as well as four slaves. A decade later, Robinson owned eight enslaved people in Richmond.

In 1826, Robinson published his first legal treatise, "Forms Adapted to the Practice in Virginia", which he republished in 1841. Between 1832 and 1839 he published "The Practice in the Courts of Law and Equity in Virginia". In February 1840, he published in the Southern Literary Messenger "An Essay of the Constitutional Rights to Slave Property."

From 1842 until 1844, Robinson succeeded his father-in law as the official reporter of the Supreme Court of Appeals (now the Virginia Supreme Court), publishing two volumes of decisions (volumes 40 and 41 of Virginia Reports), and was in turn succeeded by Peachy Grattan. In 1849 Robinson and former Congressman John M. Patton published "The Code of Virginia, with the Declaration of Independence and Constitution of the United States, and the Declaration of Rights and Constitution of Virginia'. In 1850 Robinson published his "Views of the Constitution of Virginia" in anticipation of the Virginia Constitutional Convention of that year (which ultimately wrote slaveholding as a state constitutional right, thus requiring a new constitution following the American Civil War).

Meanwhile, in 1836, Robinson became the second president of the Richmond, Fredericksburg and Potomac Railway, and served for two years, when service was extended to Fredericksburg. His engineer brother Moncure Robinson helped construct that railroad and would become its president (1840-1847), when service extended to Aquia harbor, so passengers could then catch a ferry to Washington, D.C.

Following adoption of the Virginia Constitution of 1850, voters in Richmond (who had previously only had one delegate) elected Robinson and three other men to represent them in the Virginia House of Delegates, although William C. Carrington died before the session began and A. Judson Crane resigned during the session.

Conway Robinson helped found the Virginia Historical Society in 1831, serving as its first treasurer (with John Marshall as its first president) and his father in law Benjamin W. Leigh as the first chairman of the executive committee. Robinson also arranged for publication of lectures given to the society. In 1847 he became chairman of the executive committee, and in 1854 financed its publication of Robert Greenhow's Early Voyages.[Dr. Greenhow's widow Rose Greenhow became a noted Confederate spy in the national capitol.] In 1848 Robinson delivered "An Account of Discoveries in the West until 1519, and of Voyages to and along the Atlantic Coast of North America from 1520 to 1573".

Robinson served many terms on Richmond's City Council and helped establish the Athenaeum, with rooms available for the Virginia Historical Society and the Richmond Library free of charge, as well as offering paid lectures and concerts. Circa 1851, he also helped establish Richmond's park system, including Monroe Square (originally Western Square), Gamble's Hill (formerly Madison Square) and Libby Hill (formerly Jefferson Square) parks. Beginning in 1854, the Virginia Agricultural Society held annual fairs at Western Square, sometimes known as the Fair Grounds, and which also included a race course.

During the American Civil War, the Richmond, Fredericksburg and Potomac became strategically crucial and suffered extensive damage from both armies. Robinson's firstborn son, Pvt. Leigh Robinson fought with Confederate artillery companies but survived the war, as did Conway Robinson Jr. (1852-1921), who was too young to fight. Two of their brothers died in Confederate military service. William Colston Robinson (1845-1863) died at Bristow in October 1863 and Sgt. Cary Robinson (1843-1864) fought with the 6th Virginia Infantry and died at the Battle of Burgess Mill in October 1864.

His lifework may have been "The Practice in Courts of Justice in England and the United States", published in seven volumes between 1854 and 1874. The Virginia Historical Society also has Robinson's notes on Virginia court records which were destroyed when the Confederates burned Richmond as they left in April 1865, as well as record of his 1868 motion that records be stored in a fireproof building, and 1870 resignation from the executive committee (Hugh Blair Grigsby would continue the quest for secure storage). In his final years, Robinson worked on and published the first volume of "History of the High Court of Chancery and other Institutions of England" in 1882.

== Death and legacy ==
Robinson died in Philadelphia on January 30, 1884. He was buried in Richmond at Hollywood Cemetery.

His daughter Agnes Conway Robinson donated over 1,035 books from his library, and a portrait of her father, to the Virginia Historical Society, although its finances in 1892 prevented it from publishing his memoir of Arthur Lee. The portrait may now be on loan to the National Portrait Gallery. In 1938 Agnes Conway Robinson donated forested land in Gainesville, part of the unfinished Manassas Gap Railway and near what became Manassas National Battlefield Park to the Commonwealth's Division of Forestry in his memory. It is now Conway Robinson State Forest. The Virginia Historical Society also maintains some of his papers with its Brock Collection.
