= Devil's Backbone State Forest =

State forest in Virginia, United States

- IUCN category IV (habitat/species management area)
- Location within Virginia
- Location: Shenandoah County, Virginia
- Coordinates: 39°02′42″N 78°25′41″W
- Area: 705.5 acres (285.5 ha)
- Established: 1995
- Governing body: Virginia Department of Forestry
- Website: Devil's Backbone State Forest

Devil's Backbone State Forest is a 705.5-acre (285.5 ha) state forest in Shenandoah County, Virginia. It lies on the slope of North Mountain in the drainage area of Cedar Creek near Star Tannery west of Strasburg. The forest was established by a grant by John and Bernice Hoffman, who owned the land since 1950.

The forest is managed by the Virginia Department of Forestry, with a focus on research relating to the re-establishment of American chestnut trees.

== History ==
Although much of future state forest was too steep and the soil too thin for agriculture, it nonetheless was part of a growing Virginia economy. The first industry to use the forest was iron furnaces established in the mid-18th century and existing until after the Civil War. Isaac Zane, a Quaker from Pennsylvania, built the first two of these furnaces (Zane's Old Furnace 1768-74 and The Marlboro Works 1772-95) and received grants of forest land which included the future state forest to be used to make charcoal as fuel.

In 1868 a tannery was constructed and consumed the forest for the tannin-rich bark on the trees. The tannery eventually moved on, leaving only its name attached to the nearby community of Star Tannery. Afterwards, inhabitants cut firewood and timber for charcoal-fueled kilns that produced quicklime from limestone in the Shenandoah Valley. By the middle of the 20th century, very little forest remained on the slopes of North Mountain.

John and Bernice Hoffman established the current forest on the land by planting timber stands of loblolly pine and encouraging natural regeneration of native hardwoods. They also worked to re-establish the American chestnut, formerly a dominant tree in the Appalachian forest prior to the outbreak of the chestnut blight in the early 20th century. John hopes his trees will help restore the chestnuts to their former glory and that some of them will resist the blight.

== See also ==
- List of Virginia state forests
