= 2010 Appomattox shootings =

Familicide in Virginia, U.S.

Appomattox shootings
- Location: Appomattox, Virginia, United States
- Date: January 19–20, 2010 c. 12:00 p.m. EST (UTC -5)
- Attack type: Mass murder, mass shooting
- Weapon: Unknown rifle
- Deaths: 8
- Injuries: 0
- Perpetrator: Christopher Bryan Speight

A mass murder occurred in Appomattox, Virginia, United States, on January 19, 2010. 39-year-old Christopher Bryan Speight fatally shot his sister, her husband, and her son and daughter at their home, as well as four other people. He then escaped into a forest and shot at a police helicopter searching for him, but eventually surrendered himself to authorities. On February 15, 2013, Speight was sentenced to life imprisonment.

== Shooting ==
The incident began on January 19, 2010, when police were called to a road outside Appomattox due to a neighbour reporting of a man requiring medical attention. When police arrived, they were fired on by the suspect, Christopher Bryan Speight, who also fired on a police helicopter, forcing it to make an emergency landing. Shortly afterwards, the suspect fled to a wooded area, where a force of more than a hundred police officers surrounded him. Police found three people dead in a house co-owned by the gunman (his sister and the house's co-owner, Lauralee Sipe, and her husband, Dwayne Sipe, both 38, and their four-year-old son, Joshua), and four others dead outside the house, with the last victim dying on the road. Police said that the victims were both men and women, and all were previously acquainted with the suspect. Speight was believed to have acted alone.

He surrendered on January 20, near the same wooded area where police thought he had been surrounded. He was wearing a bulletproof vest, but was not carrying the high-powered rifle believed to be the weapon used.

Prior to his surrender, police put a school and local businesses on lockdown, and advised residents to lock their houses and not go outside. Police were concerned that Speight's house had been rigged with explosives, and a bomb squad searched the building the morning after the attack. Explosives were found both inside and around the building, and were detonated safely. The house had sat unsecured for more than twelve hours as state police assumed local deputies had secured the house, and vice versa.

Speight was employed as a security guard for a grocery store at the time of the incident.

== Victims ==
Eight people were murdered by Speight

- Lauralee Sipe, 38, Speight's sister, found in living room, shot eleven times
- Dwayne S. Sipe, 38, husband of Lauralee Sipe, found in living room, shot nine or ten times
- Joshua Sipe, 4, son of Lauralee and Dwayne Sipe, found at the top of the house staircase, shot four times
- Morgan L. Dobyns, 15, daughter of Lauralee Sipe, found on porch, shot twice
- Emily A. Quarles, 15, friend of Morgan Dobyns, found in a vehicle in driveway, shot once
- Jonathan L. Quarles, 43, father of Emily Quarles, found in road/driveway, shot four times
- Karen Quarles, 43, mother of Emily Quarles, found on porch, shot thrice
- Ronald “Bo” I. Scruggs, 16, boyfriend of Emily Quarles, found in driveway, shot once in back

== Aftermath ==
On June 24, 2010, Appomattox County Circuit Court Judge Richard Blanton signed an order declaring Speight incompetent to stand trial. He was ordered to be sent to a state psychiatric hospital until such a time when he is able to assist his attorneys with his defense.

Two years after the shootings, police revealed that the three Sipes in the house were likely killed two days before Speight fatally shot the other five victims.

The case remained on hold for years as attorneys dealt with pretrial motions and awaited additional mental evaluations. According to investigators Speight told them that he had been ordered by an Egyptian goddess named Jennifer to shoot his family, because they were possessed by demons. The others were killed, he said, so they could not help his first victims, since Jennifer demanded that their bodies had to rot.

On February 15, 2013, Speight was sentenced in a plea deal to five life terms plus 18 years on three counts of capital murder, one count of attempted capital murder of a police officer (presumably because of the shots fired at the state police helicopter), and five firearms counts. The Commonwealth's Attorney Darrel Puckett said mental health experts for both the defense and the state had found Speight insane at the time, "rendering a death sentence highly unlikely" had the case gone to trial.
