= Holiday Lake 4-H Educational Center =

4-H camp in Virginia, U.S.

- U.S. National Register of Historic Places
- Virginia Landmarks Register
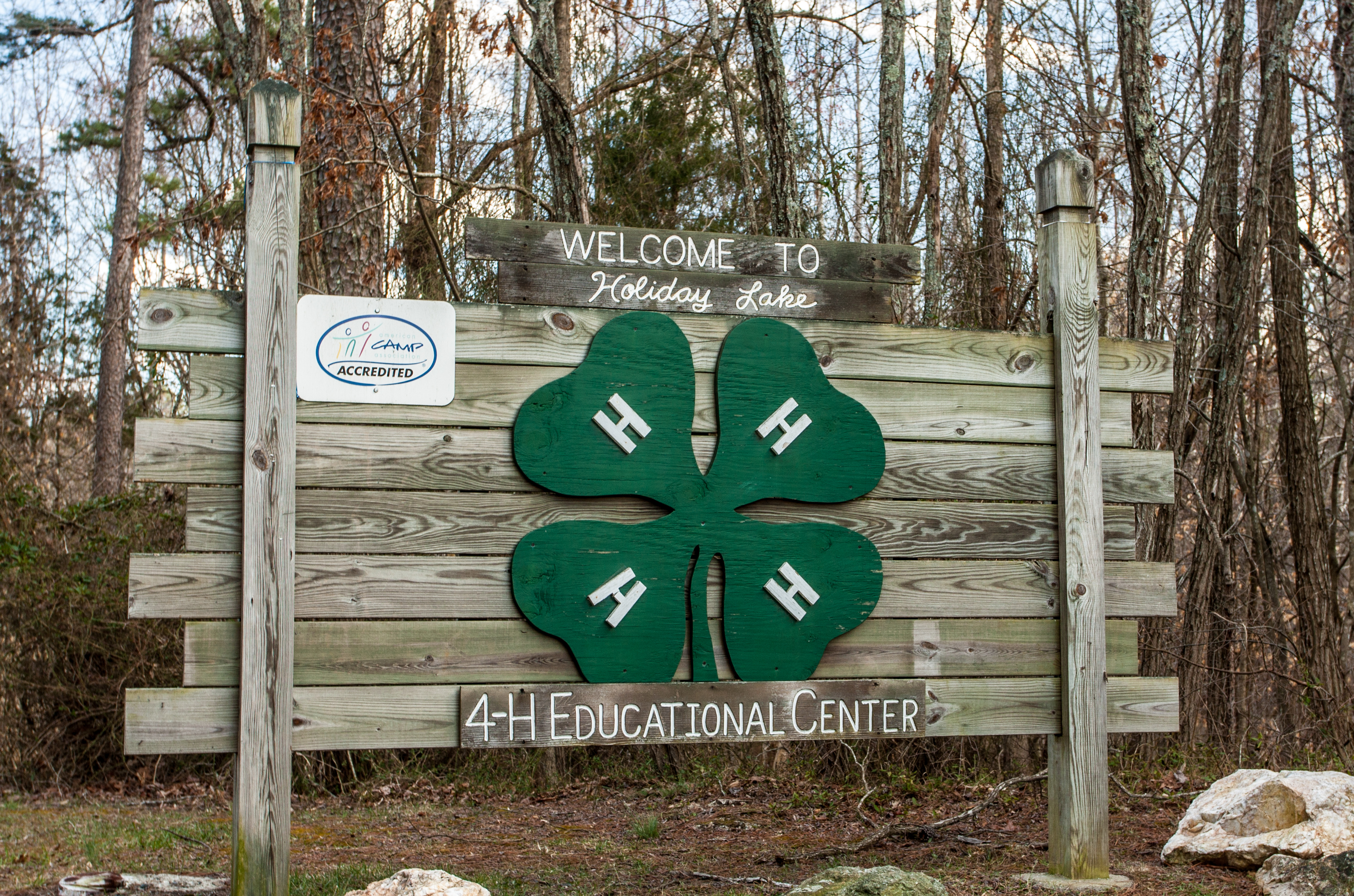
- Holiday Lake 4-H Educational Center entrance, March 2013

- Location within Virginia Location within the United States
- Location: 1267 4-H Camp Road; Route 2, Box 630 near Appomattox, Virginia
- Coordinates: 37°23′25″N 78°38′25″W
- Area: 11.17 acres (4.52 ha)
- Built: 1937-1938
- NRHP reference No.: 11000091
- VLR No.: 006-5009

Significant dates
- Added to NRHP: March 15, 2011
- Designated VLR: June 17, 2010

Holiday Lake 4-H Educational Center, also known as Surrender Grounds Forest and Holiday Lake 4-H Camp, is located within the confines of Appomattox-Buckingham State Forest near Appomattox, Appomattox County, Virginia.

== History ==
The 4-H camp was originally built by Works Progress Administration workers (in association with the Resettlement Administration) in 1937. The WPA workers housed at the camp built the nearby Holliday Lake State Park, and also worked on a New Deal reforestation demonstration project begun in 1935 to reclaim depleted farmland in the surrounding area. At the completion of the federal project, the WPA camp was turned over to the state of Virginia over a number of years for use as a state forest and park.

== 4-H camp ==
The WPA camp was not in use by 1941, it was owned by the Federal government but operated by the Virginia State Conservation Commission. The local Lions Club asked the State Conservation Commission to make improvements to the roads and buildings and complete Rural Electrification Administration hookups in the area. The 4-H Club took over the camp in 1941 and has used and expanded the facility up to the present. The 4-H Club currently leases the camp from the State Department of Forestry.

The historic portion of the camp includes 23 contributing buildings, 2 contributing sites, and 1 contributing structure. They include a dining center, 15 cabins and associated cabin site, a girl's bunk house and boy's bunk house, and a covered open-air amphitheater. Much of the historic area of the camp is contained within two natural ridges surrounding a man-made terraced field.

== Significance ==
The Camp is one of the few surviving examples of a WPA camp in Virginia, mainly due to its continuous operation as a 4-H camp since 1941. Survival of camp residential areas is unusual; as they were intended as temporary facilities, most were disassembled by the 1950s. While an individual building was sometimes maintained, only one other complex of buildings has been noted in Virginia, a former CCC camp now called Natural Bridge Juvenile Correction Center in Rockbridge County. The Holiday Lake WPA camp differs from the CCC camp in that CCC camps were generally organized in military style and favored larger barracks-style accommodations. The WPA camp features several eight-person cabins and only one larger barracks.

The Camp was listed on the National Register of Historic Places in 2011.

== Spelling ==
The state park uses the double L spelling "Holliday", after the family that owned land in the area. One of the three creeks that fills adjacent man-made lake in the area is also spelled "Holliday Creek" for the same reason. Some sources call the lake "Holliday Lake", while some online maps refer to it as "Holiday Lake".

The name of the 4-H camp is spelled with one L, Holiday Lake 4-H Camp, as is the name of the NRHP listing, Holiday Lake 4-H Educational Center.
