= Whitney State Forest =

State forest in Virginia, United States

- IUCN category VI (protected area with sustainable use of natural resources)
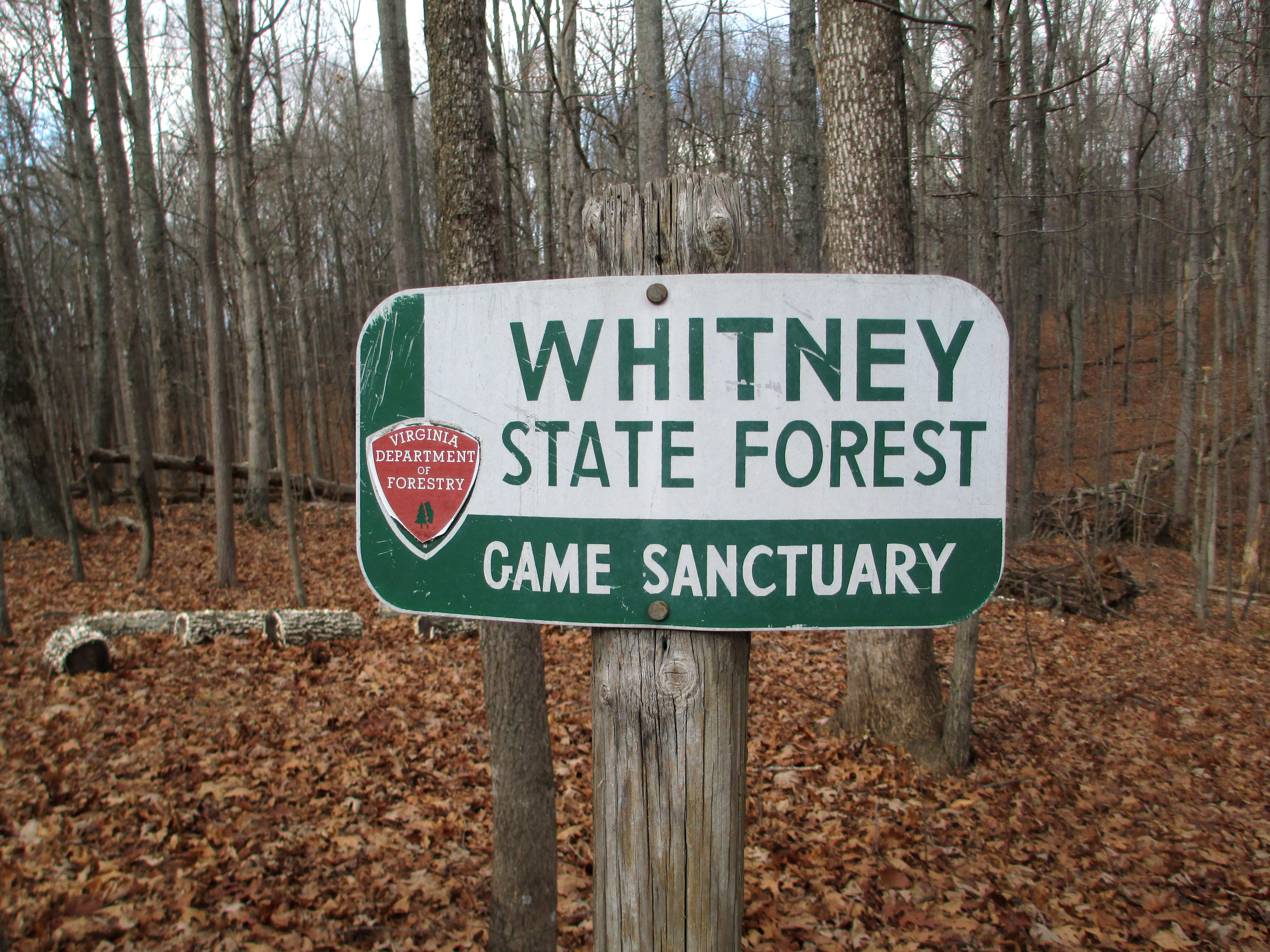
- Sign at Whitney State Forest

- Location within Virginia
- Location: Fauquier County, Virginia
- Nearest city: Warrenton
- Coordinates: 38°40′10″N 77°48′42.5″W
- Area: 148 acres (60 ha)
- Established: 1972
- Governing body: Virginia Department of Forestry

Whitney State Forest is a Virginia state forest located in Fauquier County, Northern Virginia, United States, near the town of Warrenton. It is 148 acres (0.60 km^{2}) in size, and is used for timber production and as a wildlife sanctuary in addition to providing recreational activities.
