= South Quay State Forest =

State forest in Virginia, United States

- IUCN category VI (protected area with sustainable use of natural resources)
- Location within Virginia Location within the United States
- Location: Suffolk, Virginia
- Coordinates: 36°37′20″N 76°53′20″W
- Area: 266 acres (108 ha)
- Governing body: Virginia Department of Conservation and Recreation

South Quay State Forest (Note: Quay is pronounced as "Key".) is a state forest in Suffolk, Virginia, in the South Quay Sandhills Natural Area Preserve. The forest is not open to the public. In 2013, the property was purchased by the Virginia Department of Conservation and Recreation from International Paper for preservation. The forest is home to the only longleaf pine sandhill community in Virginia.

== History ==
South Quay is named after a wharf in the nearby Blackwater River. The forest's first depiction dates back to a map made by Theodore de Bry in 1590, depicting the Blackwater and Nottoway rivers flowing into the Chowan river. The forest gained notoriety in the Revolutionary War as a port and shipyard. Two vessels were built at South Quay under Patrick Henry to defend North Carolina. The port was of a few left open for use when most ports were under blockade by the British. Thomas Jefferson was keen on keeping the port open for its remoteness.

== See also ==
- List of Virginia state forests
