= Appomattox, Virginia =

- Town
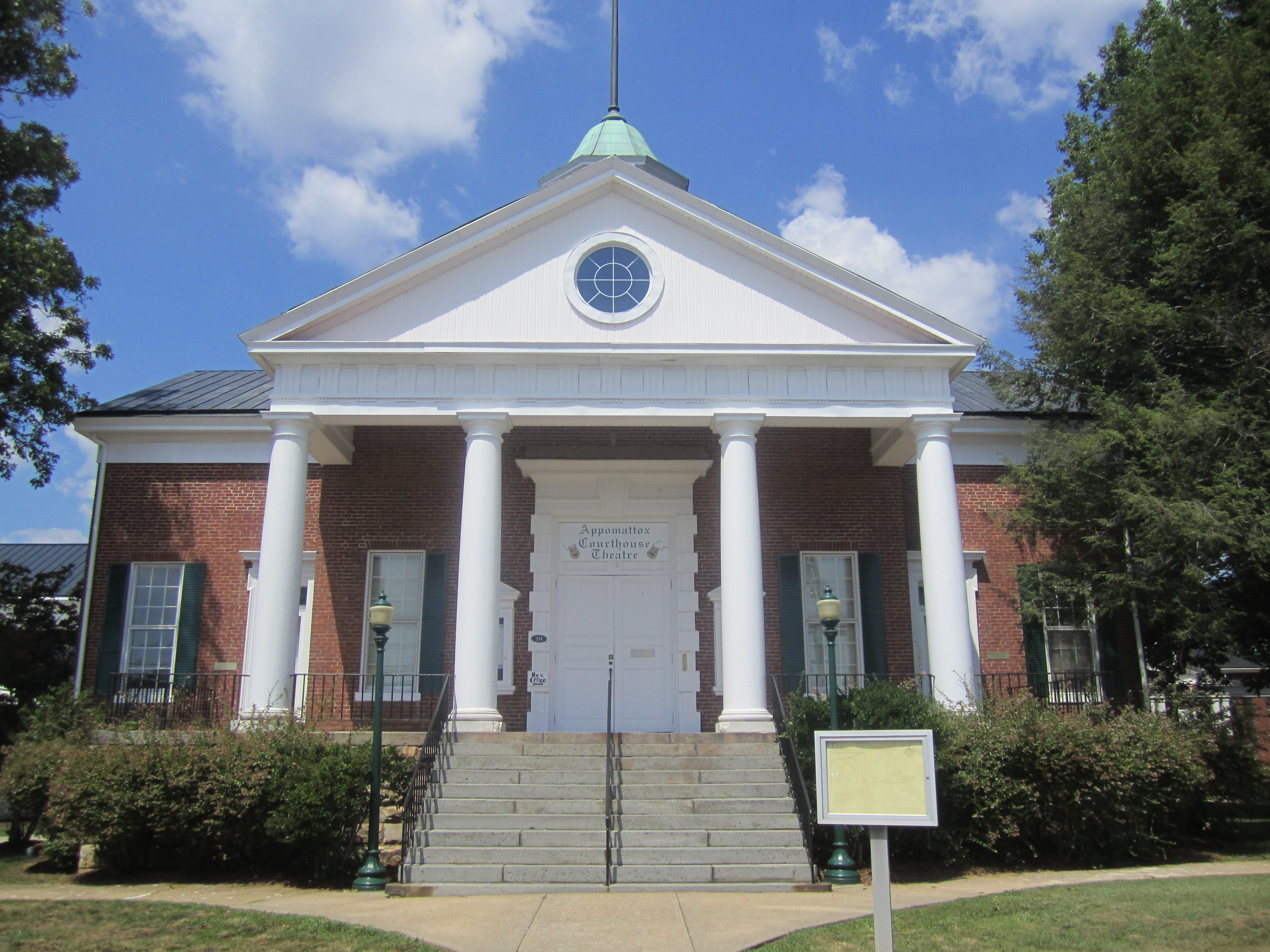
- The Appomattox Theater in July 2011.

- Seal

- Location of Appomattox Appomattox (the United States)
- Coordinates: 37°21′32″N 78°49′35″W
- Country: United States
- State: Virginia
- County: Appomattox

Area
  - Total: 2.20 sq mi (5.71 km^{2})
  - Land: 2.19 sq mi (5.68 km^{2})
  - Water: 0.0077 sq mi (0.02 km^{2})
- Elevation: 850 ft (259 m)

Population (2020)
  - Total: 1,919
  - Estimate (2019): 1,794
  - Density: 817/sq mi (315.6/km^{2})
- Time zone: UTC−5 (Eastern (EST))
  - Summer (DST): UTC−4 (EDT)
- ZIP code: 24522
- Area code: 434
- FIPS code: 51-02072
- GNIS feature ID: 1498448
- Website: townofappomattox.com

Appomattox (/ˌæpəˈmætəks/ A-pə-MA-təks) is a town in Appomattox County, Virginia, United States. As of the 2020 census, Appomattox had a population of 1,919. It is the county seat of Appomattox County.

Appomattox is part of the Lynchburg metropolitan area.

== History ==
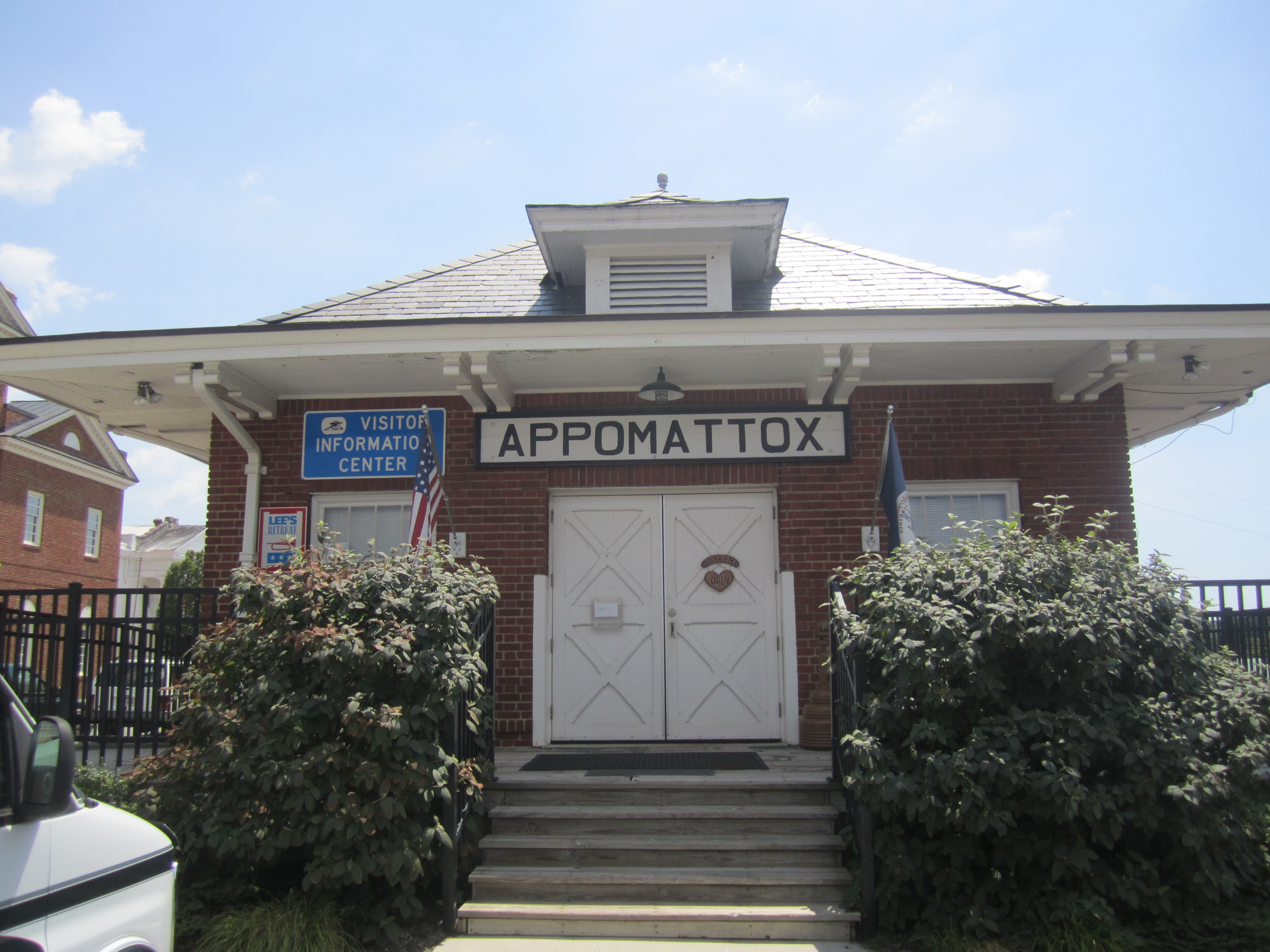
The Appomattox Visitor Center in July 2011

The town is named for the Appomattox River, which was named after the Appomattoc Native American tribe, one of the Algonquian-speaking Powhatan Confederacy, historically based in the coastal area and encountered by the English before the tribes of the Piedmont. The Appamatuck historically lived somewhat to the east of the present town, around the area of present-day Petersburg. At the time of European encounter, the area of Appomattox County above the Fall Line was part of the territory of the Manahoac tribe, who spoke a Siouan language.

At the time of the Civil War, the present community of Appomattox was the site of a railroad depot, called Appomattox Station on the line between Petersburg and Lynchburg, a stop on the Southside Railroad. The station is three miles west of the restored historic village of Appomattox Court House, the site of Confederate General Robert E. Lee's surrender to Union General Ulysses S. Grant on April 9, 1865, which essentially ended the American Civil War. The area is preserved as Appomattox Court House National Historical Park and is administered by the National Park Service.

The town was first named "Nebraska" in 1855. In 1895 it was renamed "West Appomattox". The first postmaster of "Nebraska, Virginia", was Samuel D. McDearmon.

Near the end of the Civil War, Robert E. Lee made a last attempt to reach the depot, hoping to transport the Army of Northern Virginia south by railroad to meet Joseph E. Johnston's larger Army of Tennessee, then located in Greensboro, North Carolina. The arrival of Federal troops and their blocking Lee's army from the depot led to Lee's surrender in the home of Wilmer McLean, on April 9. Johnston later surrendered 98,270 Confederate troops (the largest surrender of the war) on April 26, 1865.

Today, each April, the Appomattox Court House National Historical Park commemorates this event with a luminary ceremony, wherein a lantern is lit for each of the 4,600 slaves freed in Appomattox County alone.

The railroad became the Atlantic, Mississippi and Ohio Railroad in 1870. The inconvenience of the railroad's location to the original Appomattox Court House in the village of Clover Hill led to the decline of the courthouse community. After fire destroyed the courthouse building in 1892, the county relocated the court to the depot area, which formally became the county seat in 1894. The railroad became a line in the Norfolk and Western Railway and then the Norfolk Southern Railway.

In 1990, there were 11,971 residents reported for Appomattox County; the Town of Appomattox had 1,703 residents.

In addition to Appomattox Court House National Historical Park, the Appomattox River Bridge, Appomattox Historic District, Holiday Lake 4-H Educational Center, and Holliday Lake State Park are listed on the National Register of Historic Places.

The 2010 Appomattox shootings occurred from January 17 to 20 and left eight people dead.

== Geography ==
Appomattox is located at 37°21′32″N 78°49′35″W (37.358973, −78.826438).

According to the United States Census Bureau, the town has a total area of 2.2 square miles (5.71 km^{2}), of which 2.19 sq mi (5.68 km^{2}) are land and 0.01 sq mi (0.03 km^{2}) is water.

== Demographics ==
Historical population
Census	Pop.	Note	%±
1930	704		—
1940	992		40.9%
1950	1,094		10.3%
1960	1,184		8.2%
1970	1,400		18.2%
1980	1,345		−3.9%
1990	1,707		26.9%
2000	1,761		3.2%
2010	1,733		−1.6%
2020	1,919		10.7%
U.S. Decennial Census

=== 2020 census ===
As of the 2020 census, Appomattox had a population of 1,919. The median age was 38.0 years. 24.3% of residents were under the age of 18 and 18.6% of residents were 65 years of age or older. For every 100 females there were 82.8 males, and for every 100 females age 18 and over there were 76.8 males age 18 and over.

0.0% of residents lived in urban areas, while 100.0% lived in rural areas.

There were 784 households in Appomattox, of which 33.0% had children under the age of 18 living in them. Of all households, 35.6% were married-couple households, 18.4% were households with a male householder and no spouse or partner present, and 40.9% were households with a female householder and no spouse or partner present. About 33.6% of all households were made up of individuals and 14.9% had someone living alone who was 65 years of age or older.

There were 881 housing units, of which 11.0% were vacant. The homeowner vacancy rate was 3.2% and the rental vacancy rate was 6.7%.

Racial composition as of the 2020 census
Race	Number	Percent
White	1,146	59.7%
Black or African American	582	30.3%
American Indian and Alaska Native	8	0.4%
Asian	11	0.6%
Native Hawaiian and Other Pacific Islander	0	0.0%
Some other race	41	2.1%
Two or more races	131	6.8%
Hispanic or Latino (of any race)	72	3.8%

=== 2000 census ===
As of the census of 2000, there were 1,761 people, 716 households, and 469 families residing in the town. The population density was 808.7 people per square mile (311.9/km^{2}). There were 767 housing units at an average density of 352.2/sq mi (135.8/km^{2}). The racial makeup of the town was 66.89% White, 32.14% African American, 0.28% Native American, 0.11% from other races, and 0.57% from two or more races. Hispanic or Latino of any race were 0.23% of the population.

There were 716 households, out of which 29.3% had children under the age of 18 living with them, 42.7% were married couples living together, 20.0% had a female householder with no husband present, and 34.4% were non-families. 30.4% of all households were made up of individuals, and 17.2% had someone living alone who was 65 years of age or older. The average household size was 2.35 and the average family size was 2.92.

In the town, the population was spread out, with 23.9% under the age of 18, 8.6% from 18 to 24, 27.4% from 25 to 44, 20.8% from 45 to 64, and 19.2% who were 65 years of age or older. The median age was 39 years. For every 100 females, there were 82.3 males. For every 100 females age 18 and over, there were 75.2 males.

The median income for a household in the town was $24,167, and the median income for a family was $29,188. Males had a median income of $26,515 versus $20,732 for females. The per capita income for the town was $14,355. About 20.9% of families and 18.4% of the population were below the poverty line, including 26.4% of those under age 18 and 22.9% of those age 65 or over.

== Government ==
=== Town council ===
- Mayor, Richard C. Conner (I)
- Timothy W. Garrett (I)
- Nathan A. Simpson (I)
- Mary Lou Spiggle (I)
- Claudia G. Puckette (I)
- Aaron Tilton (I)
- Jim Boyce (I)

== Notable people ==
- Watkins Abbitt Jr., member of the Virginia House of Delegates
- Larry Robinson, former NFL player

== Climate ==
The climate in this area is characterized by hot, humid summers and generally mild to cool winters. According to the Köppen Climate Classification system, Appomattox has a humid subtropical climate, abbreviated "Cfa" on climate maps.

Climate data for Appomattox, Virginia (1991–2020 normals, extremes November 1961–present)
Month	Jan	Feb	Mar	Apr	May	Jun	Jul	Aug	Sep	Oct	Nov	Dec	Year
Record high °F (°C)	78 (26)	80 (27)	89 (32)	93 (34)	92 (33)	98 (37)	103 (39)	103 (39)	98 (37)	96 (36)	83 (28)	79 (26)	103 (39)
Mean daily maximum °F (°C)	44.9 (7.2)	49.2 (9.6)	56.7 (13.7)	68.1 (20.1)	74.9 (23.8)	82.4 (28.0)	86.1 (30.1)	84.2 (29.0)	78.0 (25.6)	68.4 (20.2)	57.2 (14.0)	48.4 (9.1)	66.5 (19.2)
Daily mean °F (°C)	35.9 (2.2)	39.0 (3.9)	45.8 (7.7)	56.1 (13.4)	64.1 (17.8)	72.5 (22.5)	76.4 (24.7)	74.7 (23.7)	68.3 (20.2)	57.6 (14.2)	46.8 (8.2)	39.4 (4.1)	56.4 (13.6)
Mean daily minimum °F (°C)	26.8 (−2.9)	28.7 (−1.8)	35.0 (1.7)	44.2 (6.8)	53.3 (11.8)	62.6 (17.0)	66.7 (19.3)	65.2 (18.4)	58.6 (14.8)	46.7 (8.2)	36.3 (2.4)	30.4 (−0.9)	46.2 (7.9)
Record low °F (°C)	−20 (−29)	−7 (−22)	2 (−17)	16 (−9)	25 (−4)	35 (2)	45 (7)	44 (7)	34 (1)	18 (−8)	8 (−13)	−8 (−22)	−20 (−29)
Average precipitation inches (mm)	3.54 (90)	2.79 (71)	3.95 (100)	3.56 (90)	4.65 (118)	3.80 (97)	4.08 (104)	3.55 (90)	4.64 (118)	3.91 (99)	3.63 (92)	4.10 (104)	46.20 (1,173)
Average snowfall inches (cm)	3.2 (8.1)	3.2 (8.1)	2.8 (7.1)	0.1 (0.25)	0.0 (0.0)	0.0 (0.0)	0.0 (0.0)	0.0 (0.0)	0.0 (0.0)	0.0 (0.0)	0.0 (0.0)	2.0 (5.1)	11.3 (29)
Average precipitation days (≥ 0.01 in)	8.4	7.3	9.3	9.4	10.9	9.6	10.0	9.1	8.3	8.1	7.7	9.2	107.3
Average snowy days (≥ 0.1 in)	1.3	0.8	0.8	0.1	0.0	0.0	0.0	0.0	0.0	0.0	0.0	2.0	11.3
Source: NOAA

== Education ==
The includes Appomattox County Public Schools includes the Appomattox County High School.
