= Zoar (Aylett, Virginia) =

- U.S. National Register of Historic Places
- U.S. Historic district
- Virginia Landmarks Register
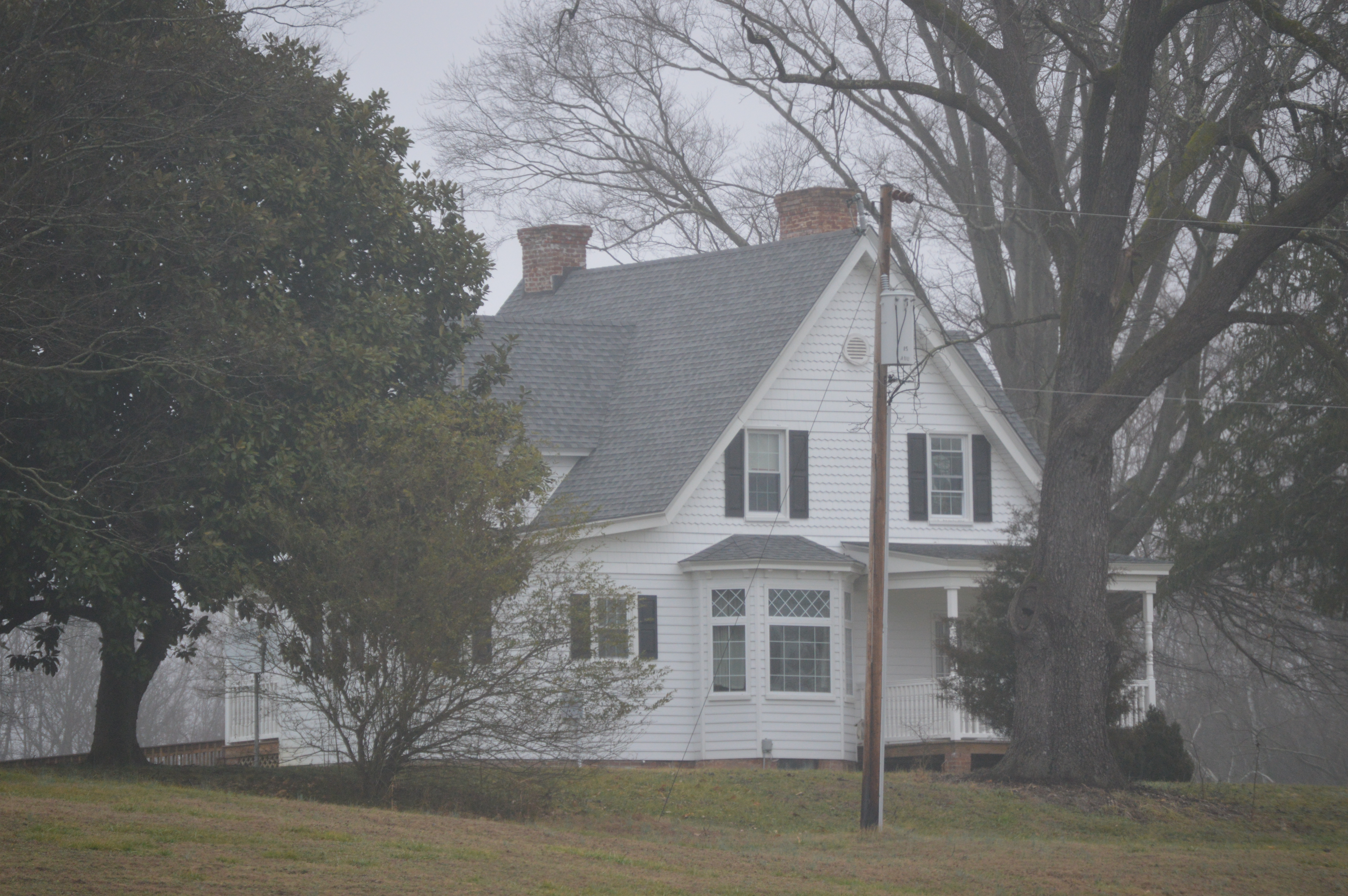
- Roadside view

- Location within Virginia Location within the United States
- Location: VA 608, Upshaw Rd., Aylett, Virginia
- Coordinates: 37°47′19″N 77°6′38″W
- Area: 327.8 acres (132.7 ha)
- Built: 1890
- Architectural style: Mid 19th Century Revival, Queen Anne
- NRHP reference No.: 06000065
- VLR No.: 050-0119

Significant dates
- Added to NRHP: June 22, 2007
- Designated VLR: December 7, 2005

Zoar is a historic former farmstead located within Zoar State Forest near the Aylett community in King William County, Virginia. It is also known as Mount Zoar, Upper Zoar, and Lower Zoar. The property, held by members of the Pollard family for over 200 years until donation to the Commonwealth includes 6 contributing buildings and 2 contributing sites. The current main house, built in 1901, is a 1 1/2-story Queen Anne style single-family frame dwelling. Contributing buildings include the smokehouse, kitchen / servant's quarters, dairy, corn crib and barn, horsefield, and family cemetery.

It was listed on the National Register of Historic Places in 2007.
