= Soaring =

Soaring may refer to:

- Gliding, in which pilots fly unpowered aircraft known as gliders or sailplanes
- Lift (soaring), a meteorological phenomenon used as an energy source by some aircraft and birds
- Soaring (magazine), a magazine produced by the Soaring Society of America
- SOARING, a public artwork at Alverno College
- List of soaring birds
- Soarin', a ride in Walt Disney parks
- Soaring (album) a 1973 Big Band jazz album by Don Ellis
- "Soarin", a song by Bazzi from Cosmic

== See also ==
- Bird flight
- Flying and gliding animals
- Dynamic soaring
- Ridge soaring
- Controllable slope soaring
- Orographic lift
- Thermals
- Lee waves
