= Appomattox-Buckingham State Forest =

State forest in Virginia, United States

- IUCN category VI (protected area with sustainable use of natural resources)
- Location within Virginia
- Location: Appomattox and Buckingham counties, Virginia
- Coordinates: 37°23′37″N 78°43′45″W
- Area: 19,513 acres (78.97 km^{2})
- Established: 1954
- Governing body: Virginia Department of Forestry

The Appomattox-Buckingham State Forest is a state forest located in the Piedmont of Virginia in Appomattox and Buckingham counties. Its 19,513 acres (30.49 sq mi; 78.97 km^{2}) are covered with a mix of oak-hickory and pine forest. Dominant tree species include oaks (white, chestnut, black, northern red, southern red and scarlet), hickories (mockernut and pignut), yellow poplar, red maple, and pines (loblolly, shortleaf, and Virginia). It is the largest state forest in Virginia.

== History ==
The forest was originally farmland that was intensively used until the 1930s. At that point in time, the land was depleted and the United States Government purchased it as part of the Bankhead-Jones Farm Tenant Act. In 1954, the tract of land was turned over to Virginia, creating the Appomattox-Buckingham State Forest. Many homesteads from the former farmers can be found in the forest. The Virginia Department of Forestry continues to work to transition the regenerating forest to a mixed ecosystem.

== Recreation ==
The Carter-Taylor Trail is a twelve-mile (19 km) loop trail open for walking, hiking, horseback riding, and mountain biking. All motorized vehicles are prohibited on the trail. The forest also has various gated trails and forest roads that can be used. Boating, fishing, and hunting are all allowed in the forest.

Holliday Lake State Park is surrounded by the forest. The park offers camping, picnicking, swimming, boating, and hiking. Permanent campsites are installed inside the park.

== See also ==
- List of Virginia state forests
- List of Virginia state parks
