= Appomattox River Bridge =

- U.S. National Register of Historic Places
- U.S. Historic district – Contributing property
- Virginia Landmarks Register
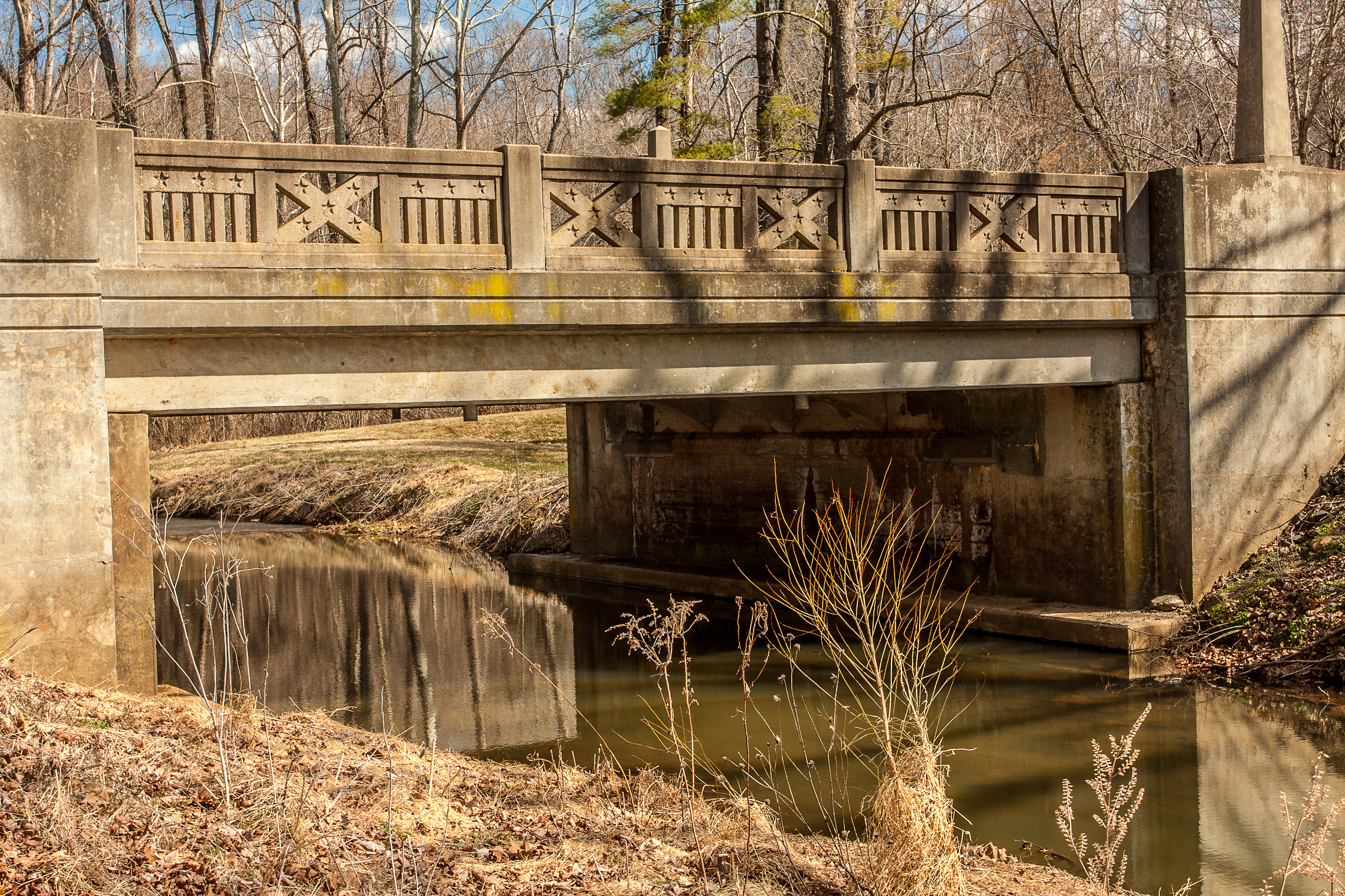
- Appomattox River Bridge, March 2013

- Location within Virginia Location within the United States
- Location: VA 24 over Appomattox River, near Appomattox, Virginia
- Coordinates: 37°22′55.3″N 78°47′22.4″W
- Area: 0.8 acres (0.32 ha)
- Built: 1930
- Built by: Virginia State Highway Commission
- Architect: Glidden, William R.
- NRHP reference No.: 05000771
- VLR No.: 006-0048

Significant dates
- Added to NRHP: July 27, 2005
- Designated VLR: June 1, 2005

Appomattox River Bridge, also known as Route 24 Bridge, is a historic road bridge located near Appomattox, Appomattox County, Virginia, in the Appomattox Court House National Historical Park. The bridge has specially designed elements that commemorate the end of the American Civil War.

== Bridge ==
T-beam bridges were first constructed in Virginia in the 1920s and were a dominant concrete bridge design from the late 1920s through the late 1960s. The Appomattox River Bridge was built in 1930, and is a common single-span, T-beam, non-arched concrete bridge. It measures 33 feet (10 m) in length in three sections, 38 feet (12 m) in overall width, and stands 11 feet (3.4 m) above the river. The bridge was widened from 30 feet (9.1 m) to its present width in 1970–1971.

== Commemoration ==
Each bridge rail consists of nine panels in three sections, 12-inch (30 cm) posts separate the sections. Each section features three alternating panels displaying stylized designs recalling the Confederate battle flag and the Union's stars and stripes flag. Four concrete obelisks, 3.5 feet (1.1 m) tall, stand on the bridge abutments.

The bridge was listed on the National Register of Historic Places in 2005.

== See also ==
- List of bridges on the National Register of Historic Places in Virginia
