= Holliday Lake State Park =

State park in Virginia, USA

- U.S. National Register of Historic Places
- Virginia Landmarks Register
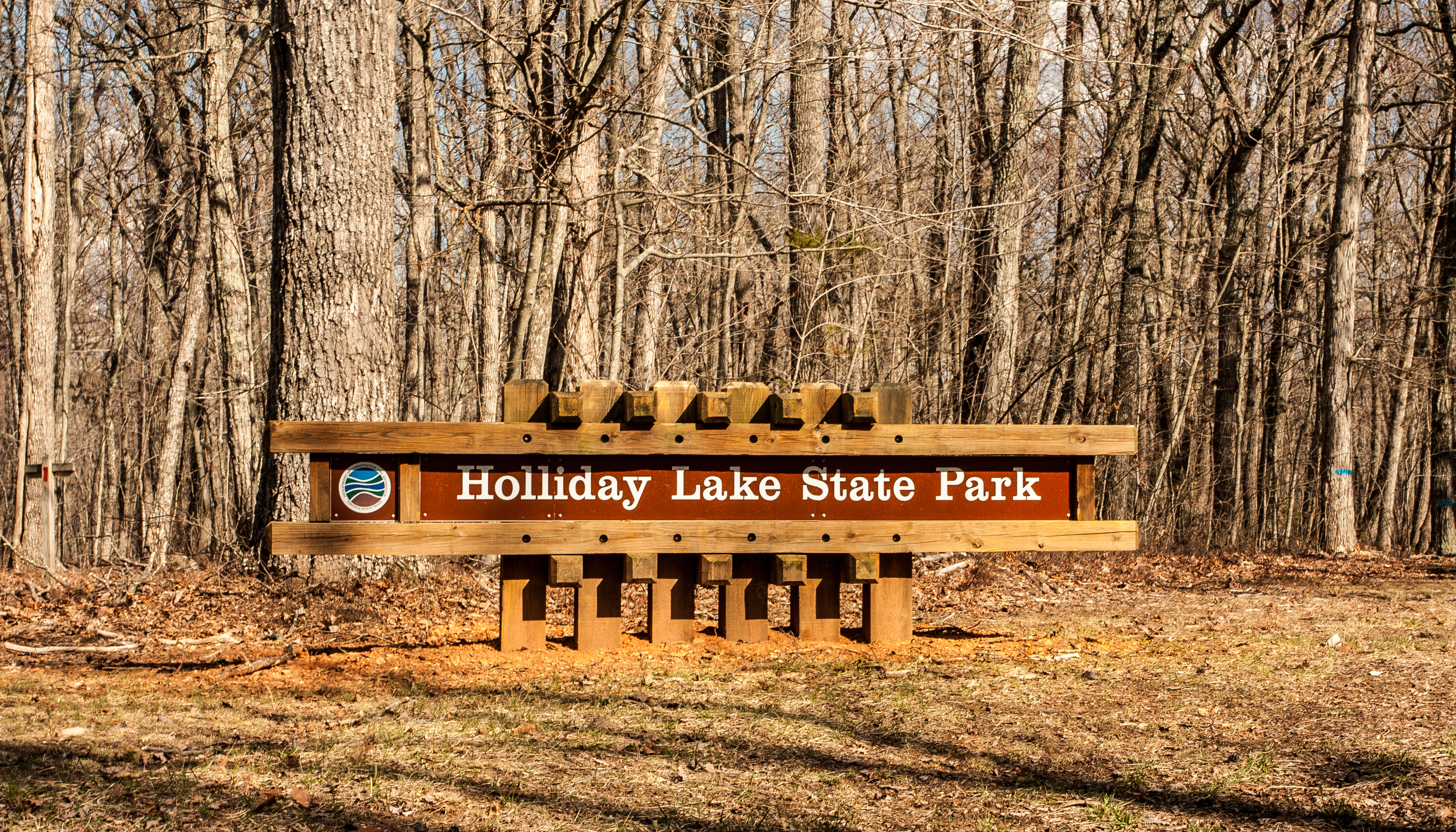

- Location within Virginia Location within the United States
- Location: 2759 State Park Rd. Appomattox, Virginia
- Coordinates: 37°23′50″N 78°38′27″W
- Area: 255.29 acres (103.31 ha)
- NRHP reference No.: 12000903
- VLR No.: 006-0051

Significant dates
- Added to NRHP: October 31, 2012
- Designated VLR: September 18, 2008

Holliday Lake State Park is a state park located within the confines of Appomattox-Buckingham State Forest in Virginia. The land was cleared as farmland in the 1880s before being returned to its forested state in the mid-20th century. The 150-acre lake was created by a dam built by the Civilian Conservation Corps (CCC) and Works Progress Administration during the Depression. Although once considered an emergency landing area for float planes, the park is now known for its fishing opportunities.

The park was one of four recreational areas developed by the Virginia Division of Forestry (now the Virginia Department of Conservation and Recreation). It opened in the 1940s, though it became a Virginia State Park in 1972. The initial focus was on beach and picnic activities, although the wellhouse and a rustic picnic shelter date to that era. The current office building is not a historic feature, as it was built in 1980, and the campground was added in 1972. Further concessions and boating facilities were added in 2005. The central water feature at Holliday Lake is the 150-acre man-made lake. Contributing resources include Picnic Shelter #1, Wellhouse (c. 1939), the Dam/Spillway/Bridge/Lake, Drainage Culvert, Retaining Wall, and the Park Circulation System. Adjacent to the park is the separately listed Holiday Lake 4-H Educational Center.

It was listed on the National Register of Historic Places in 2012.

== See also ==
- List of Virginia state parks
