= Virginia Department of Forestry =

Forest agency

The Virginia Department of Forestry (VDOF) was established in 1914 to prevent and suppress forest fires and reforest bare lands. Since its inception, the agency has grown and evolved to encompass other protection and management duties:

- Protecting Virginia's Forests from Wildfire
- Managing the Forest Resource
- Protecting Virginia's Waters
- Conservation of Virginia's Forests
- Manage the State Lands and Nurseries
- Regulated Incentive Programs for Forest landowners.

== Duties ==
The VDOF is charged with the protection of the forest resources from fire. The principal goals of the Forest Protection Program are to prevent injury or loss of human life, minimize property damage and protect resources. The activity falls into six components:

- Forest Fire Suppression
- Forest Fire Prevention
- Prescribed Fire Management
- Law Enforcement
- Woodland/Urban Interface Initiative
- Non-Fire Emergency Readiness and Response

The Department provides technical assistance to private landowners to assist them in managing their forest land for forest products, water quality, protection of threatened and endangered species, historic resources and wildlife habitat; provides marketing and utilization assistance to forest industry and provides technical assistance in managing state owned lands of other agencies. This activity falls into five components:

- technical assistance and resource management plans,
- forest renewal
- cost-share incentives
- harvesting assistance
- community grant assistance

== Organization ==
The Department is under the direction and supervision of the State Forester, who is appointed by the Governor of Virginia. The Department is located within the Governor's Secretariat of Agriculture and Forestry, which is under the direction of the Governor's Cabinet Secretary of Agriculture and Forestry. The current State Forester is Rob Farrell, appointed by Ralph Northam in 2018.

The Department divides the state into three geographic management regions. Each region is led by a Regional Forester.

- State Forester
  - Deputy State Forester
  - Assistant State Forester
    - Regional Forester
      - Deputy Regional Forester
        - Senior Area Forester
          - Area Forester
          - Area Technician

In 2012, the Virginia Department of Forestry shifted from a county-based to a multi-county, area-based life safety and public service agency under an agency reorganization plan that went into effect last week. In addition, under the "Going Mobile" concept, the state agency will further embrace new and emerging technology to enable employees to work in a mobile environment instead of a physical office. This reorganization plan to capitalize on efficiencies found in mobile technologies while at the same time reducing the need for general fund expenditures in support of agency operations during a time of decreasing state spending. VDOF's reorganization will allow it to fulfill its mission as a first response and public service agency while requiring less in appropriations and utilizing fewer full-time employees compared to the traditional model. Each team area, consisting of between 3-8 counties, is led by a Senior Area Forester. These managers will be in the field working side by side with their team members to provide all-hazard response capabilities, fight wildfires, provide forest management assistance and ensure timber harvests do not pollute our waterways.

Senior Area Foresters, Foresters and technicians are sworn law enforcement officers with the official title of Special Forest Warden.

== See also ==
- List of Virginia state forests
