= Virginia State Route 10 =

State highway in eastern Virginia, US

State Route 10

Route information
- Maintained by VDOT
- Length: 93.58 mi (150.60 km)
- Existed: 1918–present

Major junctions
- West end: US 360 in Richmond
- SR 150 in Meadowbrook; SR 288 in Chesterfield Court House; US 1 / US 301 in Chester; I-95 in Chester; I-295 in Enon; SR 36 in Hopewell; SR 106 / SR 156 near Jordan Point; SR 31 in Surry; US 258 / SR 10 Bus. in Smithfield; US 13 / US 58 / US 460 in Suffolk
- East end: US 13 Bus. / SR 32 / SR 337 in Suffolk

Location
- Country: United States
- State: Virginia
- Counties: City of Richmond, Chesterfield, City of Hopewell, Prince George, Surry, Isle of Wight, City of Suffolk

Highway system
- Virginia Routes; Interstate; US; Primary; Secondary; Byways; History; HOT lanes
← SR 9	→ US 11

State Route 10 (SR 10) is a primary state highway in the U.S. state of Virginia. The state highway runs 93.58 miles (150.60 km) from U.S. Route 360 (US 360) in Richmond east to SR 337 in Suffolk. SR 10 is a major suburban highway through Chesterfield County between the Southside of Richmond and Hopewell. Between Hopewell and Smithfield, which is served by SR 10 Business, the state highway passes through rural Prince George, Surry, and Isle of Wight counties, following the route of an old stagecoach road through an area that features many of the preserved James River plantations. SR 10 runs concurrently with US 258 and SR 32 between Smithfield and Suffolk.

== Route description ==
=== Richmond to Hopewell ===
SR 10 begins at US 360 (Hull Street) in the Southside of Richmond. The state highway heads south along two-lane undivided Broad Rock Road, which continues north of the intersection as a city street. SR 10 expands to a four-lane undivided street as the highway approaches its intersection with SR 161 (Belt Boulevard) at Hunter Holmes McGuire Veterans Administration Medical Center. The two highways run concurrently along four-lane divided Broad Rock Boulevard. The two highways diverge just north of SR 10's crossing of the CSX line that passes through Richmond's West End. The state highway intersects Warwick Road and Walmsley Boulevard while passing through the neighborhoods south of the railroad line, including Broad Rock. SR 10's name changes to Iron Bridge Road shortly before exiting the city limits at its crossing of a reservoir along Falling Creek.

SR 10 meets SR 150 (Chippenham Parkway) at a cloverleaf interchange shortly after the route enters the Meadowbrook community of Chesterfield County. The state highway has a cloverleaf interchange with another freeway, SR 288, just south of Chesterfield County Airport. SR 10 continues south through Chesterfield Court House, where the highway passes through the county office complex and by the historic home Magnolia Grange. The state highway meets the western end of SR 145 (Centralia Road) on the south side of the county seat. SR 10 curves east to pass through Chester, where the highway has a short concurrency with SR 144, which heads south as Harrowgate Road and north as Chester Road on either side of the main Richmond–Petersburg CSX rail line.

SR 10 continues east as West Hundred Road, which has an intersection with US 1 and US 301 (Jefferson Davis Highway) followed by a cloverleaf interchange with Interstate 95 (I-95, Richmond–Petersburg Turnpike). The state highway crosses over CSX's Hopewell Subdivision while passing through an industrial area. After intersecting Old Bermuda Hundred Road, SR 10 continues southeast as East Hundred Road, which has a cloverleaf interchange with I-295 in Enon. The state highway heads southeast through the community of Rivermont before crossing the Appomattox River on the Charles Hardaway Marks Bridges into the city of Hopewell. SR 10, which is named Randolph Road within the independent city, passes to the east of the plantation Weston Manor and City Point National Cemetery and meets the eastern end of SR 36 (Sixth Avenue). The state highway also passes to the south of City Point, the peninsula at the confluence of the Appomattox and James rivers that features the plantation Appomattox Manor. East of downtown Hopewell, SR 10 reduces to a two-lane undivided road and crosses under railroad tracks into an industrial area where the highway meets SR 156 (Winston Churchill Drive), where the road expands to a four-lane divided highway again. The two state highways leave the city by crossing Bailey Creek into Prince George County.

=== Hopewell to Suffolk ===
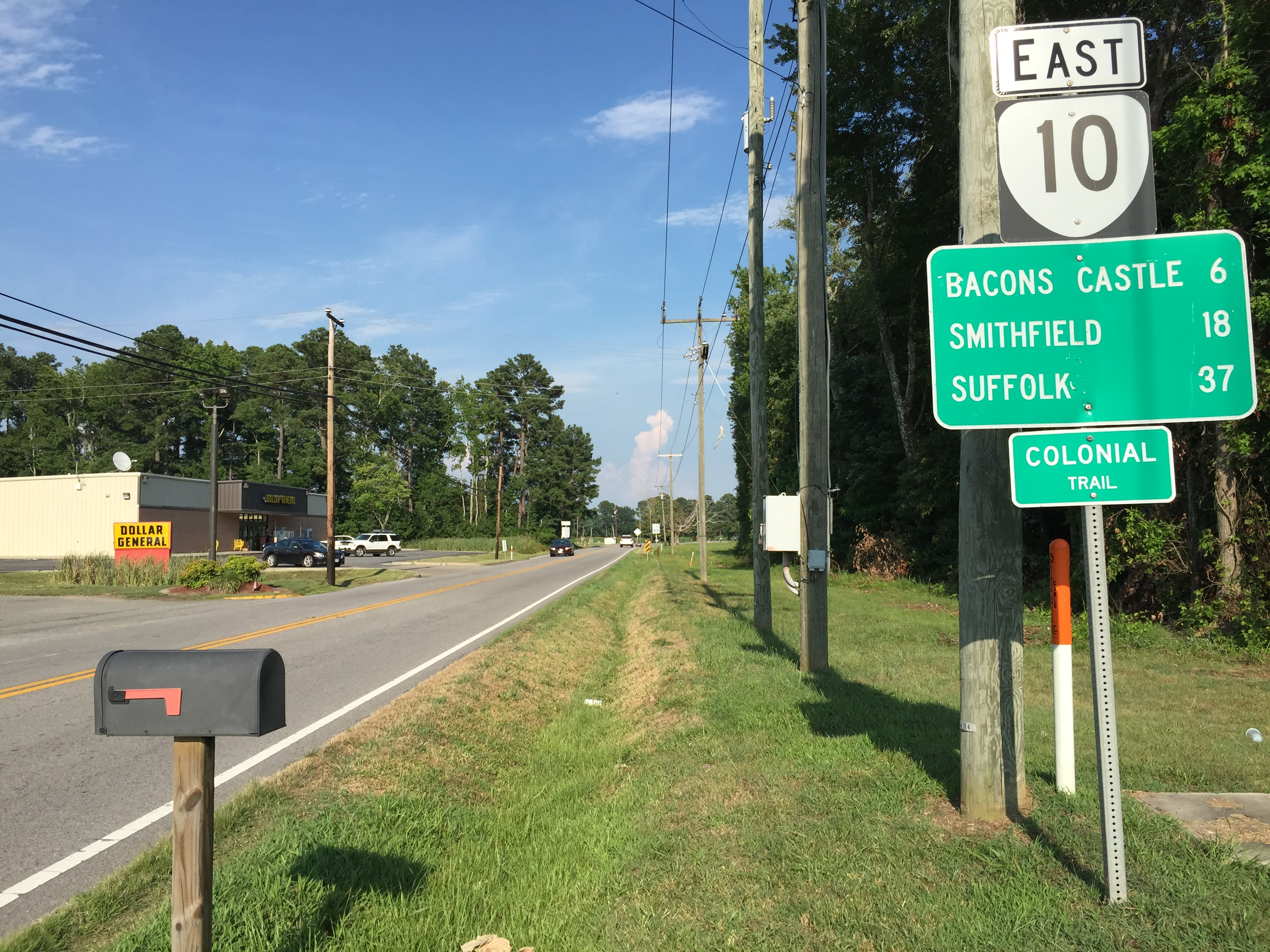
View east along SR 10 in Surry

SR 10 and SR 156 continue east as James River Drive and are joined by SR 106 (Ruffin Road) for a short distance before SR 106 and SR 156 head north on Jordan Point Road toward Jordan Point, where the highways cross the James River on the Benjamin Harrison Memorial Bridge. SR 10 reduces to a two-lane undivided road and heads southeast through a mix of farmland and forest. The state highway crosses Powell Creek at Garysville, which lies south of James River National Wildlife Refuge and Flowerdew Hundred Plantation. The state highway traverses Wards Creek at Burrowsville, which is southwest of the Upper and Lower Brandon plantations. SR 10 crosses Upper Chippokes Creek into Surry County, where the highway continues as Colonial Trail and meets the eastern end of SR 40 (Martin Luther King Highway) in Spring Grove. The north leg of the intersection leads to the town of Claremont and the plantation Four Mile Tree. SR 10 runs concurrently with SR 31 (Rolfe Highway) through the town of Surry. SR 31 leads north to the Jamestown Ferry.

SR 10 passes through the hamlet of California Crossroads, where SR 633 (Chippokes Farm Road) leads north to Chippokes Plantation State Park. The state highway traverses Lower Chippokes Creek and passes the Old Brick Church and Bacon's Castle, a rare American example of Jacobean architecture, in the namesake hamlet. SR 10 continues as Old Stage Highway after crossing Lawnes Creek into Isle of Wight County, where the highway briefly parallels the James River through Rushmere. South of Rushmere, Old Stage Highway splits southeast as SR 10 Business, which passes by the Smithfield Foods plant and through downtown Smithfield. SR 10 crosses the Pagan River and enters the town of Smithfield just before intersecting Main Street, which heads southwest as US 258 and northeast as US 258 Business into downtown Smithfield. SR 10 and US 258 have a diamond interchange with Fairway Drive and cross Cypress Creek before meeting the other end of US 258 Business and SR 10 Business (Church Street) just south of the town limits. SR 10 and US 258 continue south together as Benns Church Road, a four-lane divided highway, to Benns Church, the site of historic St. Luke's Church. US 258 turns east onto Brewers Neck Road, which also carries SR 32, to head toward the James River Bridge to Newport News.

SR 32 joins SR 10 in a concurrency that continues through SR 10's eastern terminus in Suffolk. At the northern city limit of Suffolk at Wills Corner, the highways reduce to two lanes and become Godwin Boulevard. SR 10 and SR 32 cross Chuckatuck Creek and meet the western end of SR 125 (Kings Highway) in the community of Chuckatuck. After crossing the Western Branch of the Nansemond River, the two highways expand to a four-lane divided highway and enter a suburban area. SR 10 and SR 32 pass by Sentara Obici Hospital before a partial cloverleaf interchange with the Suffolk Bypass, which carries US 13, US 58, and US 460. South of the interchange, the two highways become a five-lane road with a center left-turn lane. The highways meet and are joined by US 460 Business (Pruden Boulevard) at Elephant Fork. Just south of their crossing of the Nansemond River, the highways intersect Constance Road, which features US 58 Business on both sides of the intersection. US 460 Business turns east onto Constance Road, while US 13 Business joins SR 10 and SR 32 south on four-lane undivided Main Street into downtown Suffolk. SR 10 reaches its eastern terminus at SR 337 (Washington Street), where SR 32 and US 13 Business continue south along Main Street toward North Carolina.

== History ==
SR 10 is one of two routes to survive from the inception of Virginia's state route system in 1918 without being completely renumbered or decommissioned, the other being SR 28. Unlike SR 28, which today contains none of its original routing, SR 10's route between Garysville and Suffolk is largely unchanged from 1918. Much of the rest of SR 10's original approximately 570-mile route – west of Petersburg and east of Suffolk – was replaced by the introduction of U.S. Routes 11, 58, and 460 in the late 1920s and early 1930s.

== Major intersections ==
County	Location	mi	km	Destinations	Notes
City of Richmond		0.00	0.00	US 360 (Hull Street)	Western terminus
City of Richmond		0.81	1.30	SR 161 north (Belt Boulevard)	Western end of SR 161 concurrency
City of Richmond		1.24	2.00	SR 161 south (Belt Boulevard)	Eastern end of SR 161 concurrency
Chesterfield	Meadowbrook	4.50	7.24	SR 150 (Chippenham Parkway) to I-95 / SR 895 / to Powhite Parkway	interchange
Chesterfield		8.90	14.32	SR 288 to I-95 / US 360 / SR 76 north	interchange
Chesterfield	Chesterfield			SR 145 east (Centralia Road)	Western terminus of SR 145
Chesterfield	Chester	15.07	24.25	SR 144 south (Harrowgate Road)	Western end of SR 144 concurrency
Chesterfield	Chester	15.32	24.66	SR 144 north (Chester Road) / SR 1515 (Winfree Street) – Centralia	Eastern end of SR 144 concurrency
Chesterfield	Chester	17.00	27.36	US 1 / US 301 (Jefferson Davis Highway) – Richmond, Colonial Heights, Brightpoint Community College, DSCR, DDRV	
Chesterfield		17.44	28.07	I-95 – Richmond, Petersburg	Exit 61 (I-95)
Chesterfield		21.37	34.39	I-295 – Washington, Rocky Mount, NC	Exit 15 (I-295)
Appomattox River		23.34	37.56	Charles Hardaway Marks Bridges	
City of Hopewell		24.88	40.04	SR 36 west (North 6th Avenue) – City Point National Cemetery	Eastern terminus of SR 36
City of Hopewell		26.02	41.88	SR 156 Bus. south (Winston Churchill Drive) to I-95 south / I-295 south / US 460 / US 301 / SR 36 – Petersburg	Western end of SR 156 Bus. concurrency
Prince George		28.45	45.79	SR 106 south / SR 156 south / SR 644 (Ruffin Road) to US 460 – Prince George	east end of SR 156 Bus. overlap; west end of SR 106 / SR 156 overlap
Prince George		29.18	46.96	SR 106 north / SR 156 north (Jordan Point Road) to SR 5 – Charles City, Williamsburg, Benjamin Harrison Memorial Bridge, James River plantations	Eastern end of SR 106 / SR 156 concurrency
Prince George	Garysville			SR 609 (Old Stage Road) – Prince George	former SR 106 south
Prince George				SR 625 (Hines Road)	former SR 154 south
Surry	Spring Grove	47.34	76.19	SR 40 west (Martin Luther King Highway) / SR 646 (Swanns Point Road) – Claremont, Waverly	Eastern terminus of SR 40
Surry		55.24	88.90	SR 31 south (Rolfe Highway) – Wakefield	Western end of SR 31 concurrency
Surry	Surry	56.28	90.57	SR 31 north (Rolfe Highway) / SR 626 (Oakwood Drive) – Jamestown Ferry, Williamsburg	Eastern end of SR 31 concurrency
Surry	Bacons Castle			SR 617 (Bacons Castle Trail / White Marsh Road) – Wakefield	to former SR 196 west
Isle of Wight		70.28	113.10	SR 10 Bus. east (Old Stage Highway) – Smithfield	Western terminus of SR 10 Bus.
Isle of Wight	Smithfield	74.02	119.12	US 258 south / US 258 Bus. north (Main Street) – Smithfield, Windsor, Isle of Wight, Emporia, Smithfield Center, Smithfield Historic District, Isle of Wight County Museum	Western end of US 258 concurrency; southern terminus of US 258 Bus.
Isle of Wight	Smithfield			SR 710 south (Fairway Drive)	Interchange
Isle of Wight	Smithfield	76.32	122.83	US 258 Bus. south / SR 10 Bus. west (South Church Street) – Smithfield, Smithfield Center	Northern terminus of US 258 Bus.; eastern terminus of SR 10 Bus.
Isle of Wight	Benns Church	78.28	125.98	US 258 north / SR 32 north (Brewer's Neck Boulevard) – Newport News, Portsmouth	Eastern end of US 258 concurrency; western end of SR 32 concurrency
City of Suffolk		83.74	134.77	SR 125 east (Kings Highway) – Hobson	Western terminus of SR 125; former SR 192 east
City of Suffolk		90.78	146.10	US 13 / US 58 / US 460 – Norfolk, Virginia Beach, Petersburg, Emporia	Interchange
City of Suffolk		91.32	146.97	US 460 Bus. west (Pruden Boulevard) – Petersburg	Western end of US 460 Bus. concurrency
City of Suffolk		92.90	149.51	US 13 Bus. north / US 58 Bus. / US 460 Bus. east (Constance Road)	Eastern end of US 460 Bus. concurrency; western end of US 13 Bus. concurrency
City of Suffolk		93.58	150.60	Washington Street (SR 337) / Main Street (US 13 Bus. south / SR 32 south)	Eastern terminus: eastern end of US 13 Bus. / SR 32 concurrency
1.000 mi = 1.609 km; 1.000 km = 0.621 mi: Concurrency terminus

== Smithfield business route ==
State Route 10 Business
- Location: Smithfield
- Length: 6.63 mi (10.67 km)

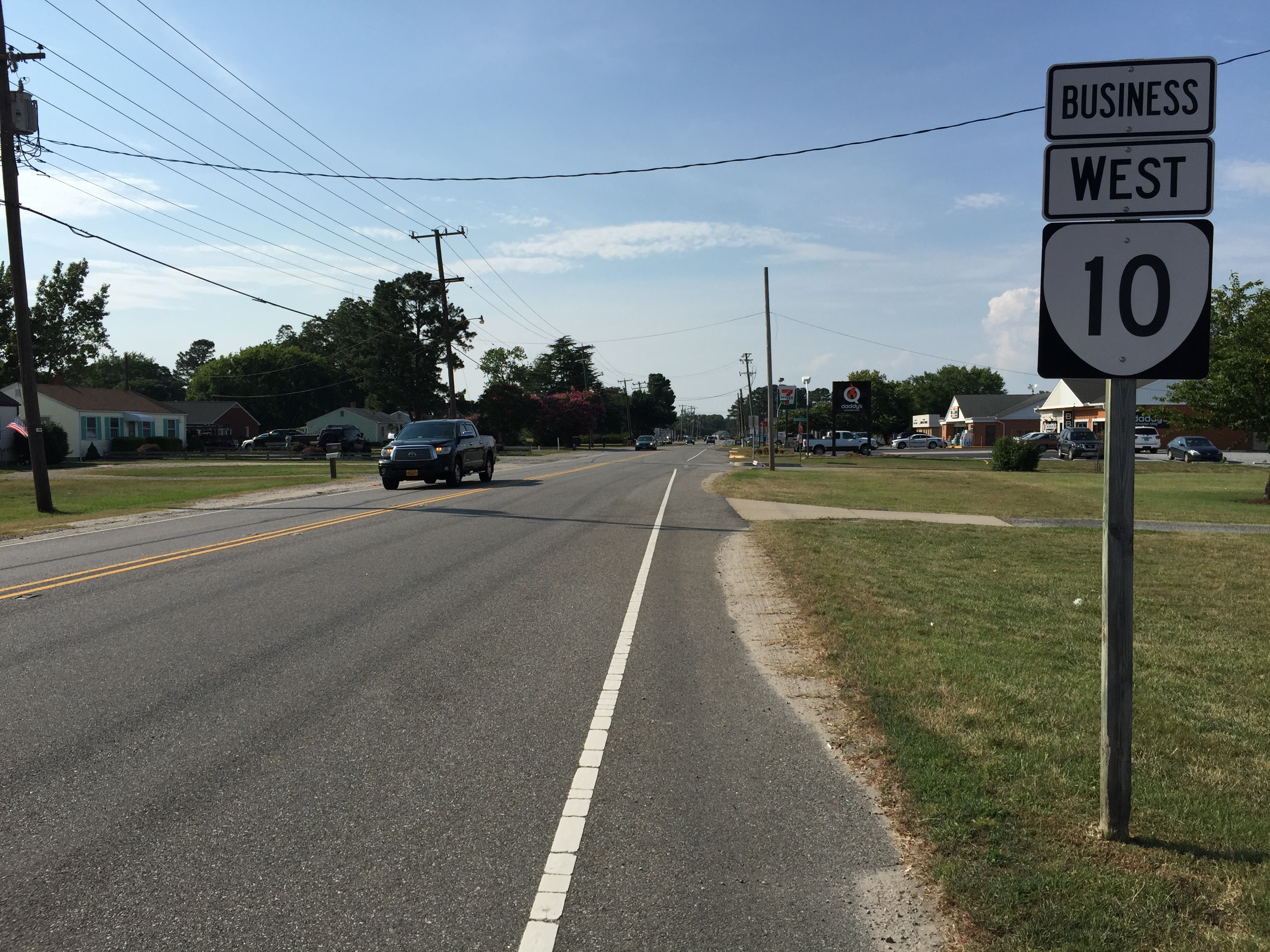
View west along SR 10 Bus. (and south along US 258 Bus.) in Smithfield

SR 10 Business is a business route of SR 10 in Isle of Wight County. The business route runs 6.63 miles (10.67 km) from SR 10 and US 258 south of Smithfield to SR 10 north of Smithfield. SR 10 Business follows Church Street through the town of Smithfield. The business route runs concurrently with US 258 Business from their common southern terminus north and west across Cypress Creek into downtown Smithfield. The two routes provide access to Windsor Castle, which is physically closer to but cannot be accessed from the bypass. In downtown Smithfield, US 258 Business turns west onto Main Street. SR 10 Business continues north across the Pagan River and passes by the Smithfield Foods factory before leaving the town. The business route continues as Old Stage Highway to its northern end at SR 10 south of Rushmere.

SR 9 became SR 39 in 1923	Two‑digit State Routes; 1923-1933	SR 11 >
