= Fort Powhatan =

Former river defense fort near Garysville, Virginia

- Windmill Hill, Garysville, Prince George County, Virginia
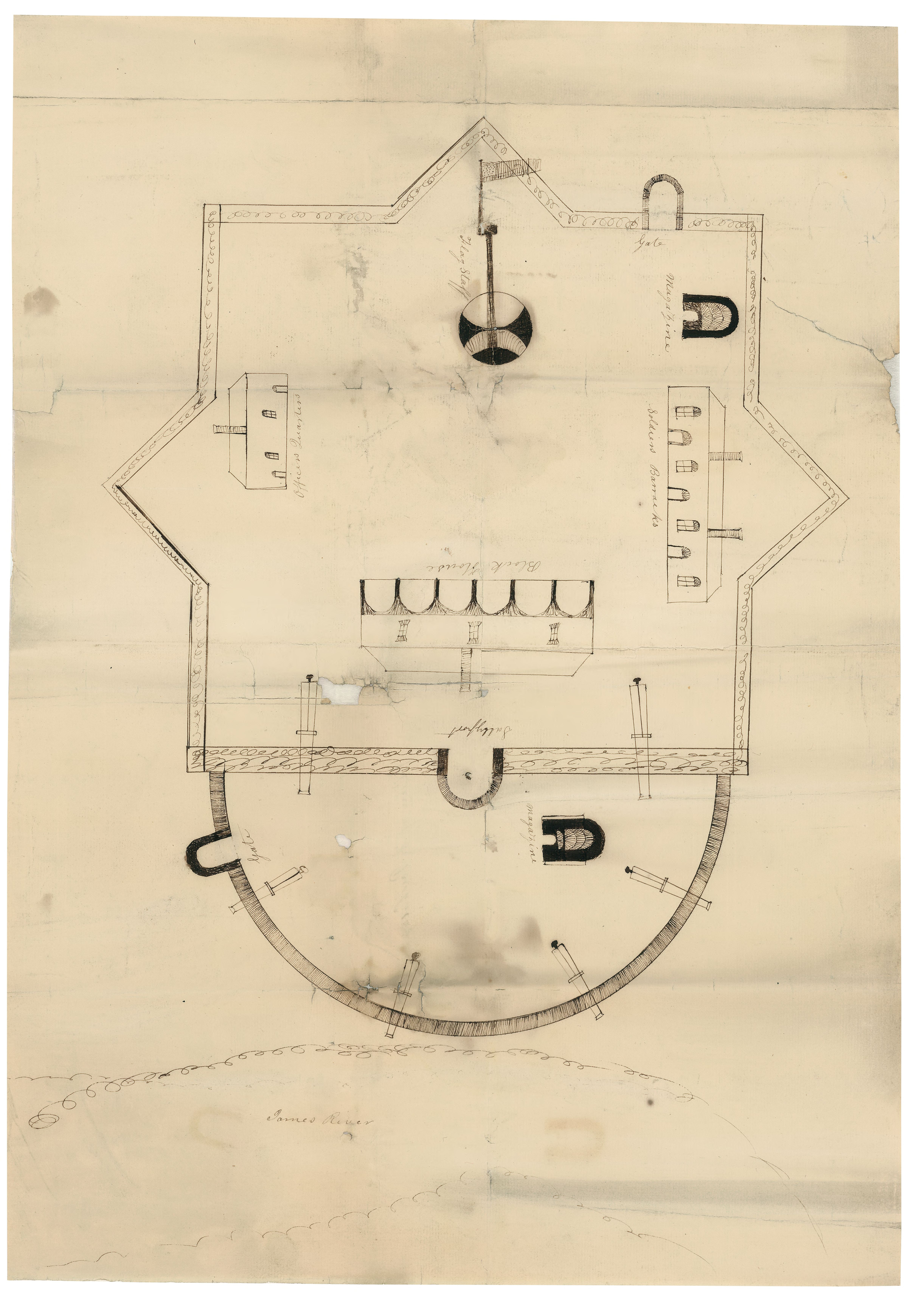
- Plan of Fort Powhatan in 1819

Site information
- Type: Masonry fort
- Controlled by: Private
- Open to the public: No
- Condition: Portions remain

Location
- Coordinates: 37°16′12″N 77°04′39″W

Site history
- Built: 1776 (2-gun battery); 1781 (earthwork fort); 1808–1812 (masonry fort); 1862 (earthwork added)
- Built by: Patriot forces United States Army Corps of Engineers; Confederate forces
- In use: 1779–1783; 1814–1830; 1862–1865
- Materials: Brick, earth
- Battles/wars: American Revolution; War of 1812; American Civil War

Fort Powhatan is a former river defense fort located at Windmill Hill (also called Hood's Bluff) near Garysville, Virginia, 2.5 miles (4.0 km) southeast of Flowerdew Hundred Plantation in Prince George County, Virginia. The fort was named for the area's Powhatan tribe of indigenous people; the name is also an English term for their leader. It is on the south bank of the James River, sited to prevent enemy vessels proceeding upriver to Richmond. The first fort on the site was a two-gun battery called Hood's Battery, built in 1779 during the American Revolutionary War and named after the owner of the plantation it was on. In January 1781, British forces under Benedict Arnold attacked and dismantled the battery and went on to burn Richmond. Later that year a larger fort was built, named Fort Hood (or Fort at Hood's Bluff). In 1808 this was replaced by the federal government with Fort Powhatan, part of what was later called the second system of US fortifications. The fort was not attacked in the War of 1812. In 1862, during the American Civil War, Confederate forces added a new earthwork battery on the site; the fort area was abandoned by Confederates, and subsequently captured by Union forces in July 1863. The fort was abandoned at the end of the war in 1865.

== American Revolution ==
As part of the American Revolutionary War, in May 1779 the British Chesapeake raid under Commodore Sir George Collier caused Virginia's Revolutionary government to strengthen its defenses. Among these efforts was Hood's Battery, a two-gun earthwork on the south bank of the James River at John Hood's plantation, at Windmill Hill (also called Hood's Bluff) in Prince George County, Virginia. This battery was inadequate to prevent the burning of Richmond by British forces under Benedict Arnold in January 1781; the British successfully attacked the battery on their way upriver on 3 January, and captured and dismantled it on their way back on 10 January, despite being ambushed by a force under George Rogers Clark. A larger fortification named Fort Hood (or Fort at Hood's Bluff) was built on the site beginning later that year. It was an earthwork, possibly reinforced with brick, and had eight heavy guns facing the river, a redoubt with at least two field guns for land defense, and a garrison of 60 men. The fort was not begun until late 1781, two months after British general Cornwallis surrendered at Yorktown, and was never attacked.

== 1783 through War of 1812 ==
In 1808 a new masonry fort was built by the federal government on the site of Fort Hood, as part of what was later termed the second system of US fortifications. It was named Fort Powhatan, and was designed for 13 guns with a blockhouse and a detached water battery (a battery near the river). The engineer in charge was Captain Walker K. Armistead. In the Army report on fortifications for December 1808, the water battery is described as "a strong battery of mason work has been erected", and the "regular enclosed work" was "in considerable forwardness...". Although incomplete, the fort was used as a district headquarters for coastal forts in Virginia by Colonel Edward Pasteur in 1809. The star fort (with a semi-circular water battery) was still incomplete in 1811 (though barracks for one company were complete), and was not armed until the War of 1812 broke out. By 1814 the fort had 22 artillery pieces. It was not attacked in the war, and by 1830 was no longer reported to be in use.

== American Civil War ==
During the Civil War, the Confederate government built a new battery on the bluff above the fort in 1862. The Union captured the battery in 1863, and in 1864 a garrison of U.S. Colored Troops repulsed a Confederate cavalry attack led by Fitzhugh Lee. The fort was abandoned after the war.

== Present ==
The fort is now the private property of a gun club. The brick magazines, water battery, and Civil War battery still exist. Virginia Historical Marker K-215 (Hood's) (on Virginia State Route 10 east of County Route 614) mentions the Revolutionary War actions and the existence of Fort Powhatan.

== See also ==
- Seacoast defense in the United States
- List of coastal fortifications of the United States
