= Grant's Headquarters at City Point Museum =

Museum operated by the National Park Service at Appomattox Manor in Hopewell, Virginia

Coordinates: 37°19′0.5″N 77°16′38.6″W

Grant's Headquarters at City Point is a museum operated by the National Park Service at Appomattox Manor in Hopewell, Virginia. It is a unit of the Petersburg National Battlefield Park, located where Lieutenant General Ulysses S. Grant had his headquarters for nine-and-a-half months.

City Point was a port on the James River. During the last years of the American Civil War, from the port there, the City Point Railroad was used to support the Union forces during the Siege of Petersburg 1864–65. The successful capture of Petersburg and its network of railroads was the key to the fall of the Confederate capital city of Richmond, ending the war less than a week later.

At the museum, the grounds include Grant's headquarters, and a plantation house with outbuildings. In the plantation house are furnished rooms, an introductory video, a diorama, and a bookshop.
