= Richard Eppes =

American planter, slaveholder and surgeon (1824–1896)

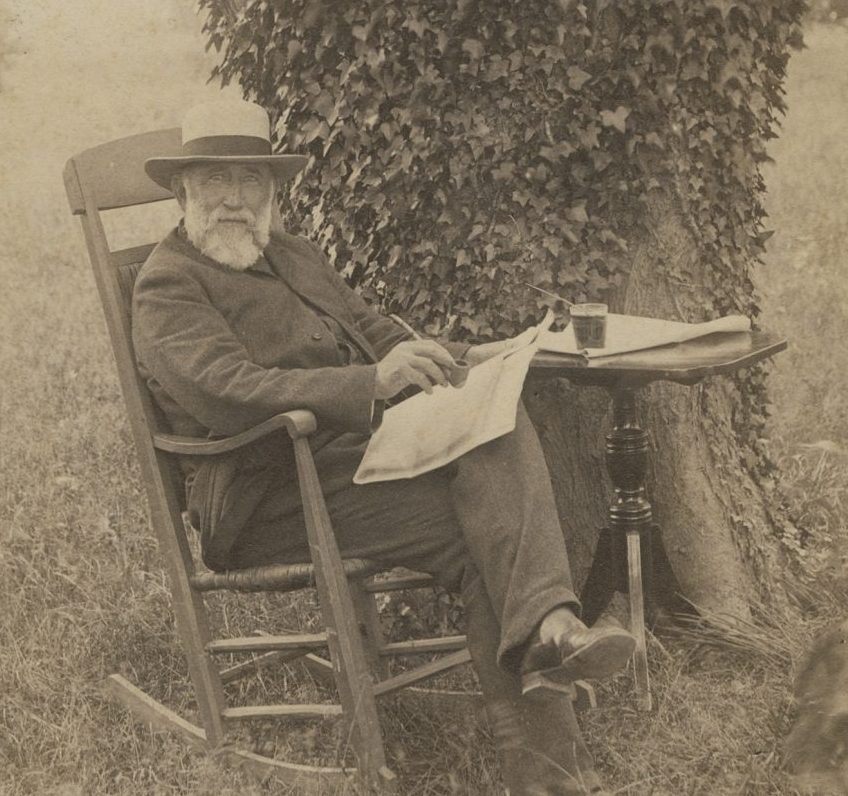
Richard Eppes at the end of his life.

Richard Eppes (May 2, 1824 – February 17, 1896) was a prominent planter in Prince George County, Virginia and a surgeon in the Confederate States Army during the American Civil War. Eppes is notable for his having kept extensive journals about his plantation and life; the journals for 1849 and 1851–1896 are held by the Virginia Historical Society and have been invaluable to historians of the Antebellum South. His Appomattox Manor was used as a base by Union general Ulysses S. Grant during his siege of Petersburg, Virginia.

== Early life and education ==
Eppes was born in City Point, Virginia on the estate his father Benjamin Cocke managed for his mother. After his father's death he took his mother's family name. Eppes went to Petersburg Classical Institute 1840–1843, enrolled at William & Mary in 1843, but transferred to the University of Pennsylvania where he took his medical degree in 1847. Two years after his graduation he travelled through the Near East. Eppes mother died in 1844 and after the estate was settled in 1851 he took control of Appomattox Manor as sole heir.

== Marriage and family ==
In 1850 had married Josephine Dulles Horner, the daughter of the dean of the medical school at Pennsylvania, who died of complications during childbirth less than two years after their marriage. His wife's death plunged Eppes into a deep depression, but in 1854 he married, in accordance with his late wife's wishes, her sister Elizabeth Welsh Horner. They had nine children of which three died in childhood.

== Plantation owner ==
At the time of the Civil War, Eppes owned nearly 130 slaves and 2,300 acres (9.3 km^{2}) at City Point and Eppes Island directly across the James River. He had given up his medical practice to manage his three plantations, devoted to wheat and other grains, and associated slaves. Eppes favored preservation of the Union, provided that Southern rights in slave property could be protected. In the Election of 1860, he supported John C. Breckinridge, who led the Southern faction of the Democratic party. Breckinridge represented those who were states rights and pro-slavery men, but who were not radical secessionists.

Richard Eppes, encouraged slave marriages to discourage escape. He watched boats coming up the Appomattox to make sure that they were not picking up slaves and he took turns with other white landowners riding around City Point, looking for African Americans who may be involved in helping slaves escape. He also discouraged slaves and poor whites from trading in stolen grain which might lead to escape plans. Slaves often traveled to Hopewell to work on other plantations owned by Richard Eppes. Slaves were helped by railroad workers and ship captains stopping in Petersburg, in their journeys to freedom up north as a part of the Underground Railroad.

== Civil War ==
When war broke out, Eppes enlisted in the 3rd Virginia Cavalry and helped equip the unit. About a year later, he paid for a substitute to complete his obligation. (Most planters were excluded from service, as the government believed they needed to keep agricultural production going and to manage the slaves.) Early in May 1862, his wife and children moved to Petersburg, which was located inland above the falls of the James River, for safety. Just days later, a Union raiding party landed at City Point.

When the troops departed, all but twelve of Eppes' slaves had escaped with them, choosing to join the Union forces to gain freedom. Among those who escaped was Richard Slaughter, who decades later told his story to a Works Progress Administration interviewer in 1936. Most slaves were taken to Hampton, where they worked for the Union forces, and many began to learn to read and write. When given the chance, Slaughter and other men enlisted in the United States Colored Troops.

Eppes worked as a civilian contract surgeon for the Confederate army in Petersburg for the duration of the war. In the middle of the siege, Eppes got his family out of Petersburg and sent them to his wife's family in Philadelphia to wait out the war. When Petersburg fell, Eppes decided to stay behind with the wounded as Robert E. Lee evacuated the Confederate forces from the city.

== Postbellum ==
By May 1865, Eppes had taken the Amnesty Oath, but found that his wealth excluded him from benefits of the Amnesty Proclamation. He had to raise money to reclaim and essentially purchase the title to his land and settle up with the Federal government. He also had to pay for any of the structures which the Union army left behind on his land before he could alter them. By early 1866, after a favorable transaction with the government, he controlled his plantation again. By March 1866, his family had returned and they were living at City Point. Eppes died at his home on February 17, 1896.

== Diaries ==
Eppes kept voluminous, detailed journals, which have been a source for historians on his planning and operation of his plantation, as well as the war and post-bellum years. The volumes for 1849 and 1851–1896 are in the collections of the Virginia Historical Society, in Richmond.
