= Enon, Virginia =

Census-designated place in Virginia, US

- CDP
- Location within the state of Virginia Enon (the United States)
- Coordinates: 37°19′38″N 77°19′10″W
- Country: United States
- State: Virginia
- County: Chesterfield
- Elevation: 91 ft (28 m)

Population (2020)
  - Total: 4,075
- Time zone: UTC−5 (Eastern (EST))
  - Summer (DST): UTC−4 (EDT)
- ZIP codes: 23836
- GNIS feature ID: 2629708

Enon is a census-designated place (CDP) located in the eastern point of Chesterfield County, Virginia, United States, just east of Chester. The population as of the 2020 census was 4,075.

== History ==
In 1611, 300 musketeers were ordered by the Virginia Company of London to travel up the James River, away from the unsafe swamplands of Jamestown. They were ordered to develop a new capital of Virginia, where they were led by Sir Thomas Dale. The musketeers landed at present day Enon and founded Bermuda Hundred. This colony become the second successful British colony in Virginia.

Through most of the 20th century, Enon remained a largely undeveloped rural area until the development of Rochedale Farm, one of the James River Plantations, as a high end residential community and golf course known as River's Bend starting in 1988. Since the turn of the 21st century, several other large tracts of farmland and timberland in the Enon area, including Meadowville and Mount Blanco have since been sold for residential and commercial development.

== Demographics ==
Historical population
| Census | Pop. | Note | %± |
|---|---|---|---|
| 2010 | 3,466 | | — |
| 2020 | 4,075 | | 17.6% |
U.S. Decennial Census; 2010 2020

Enon was first listed as a census designated place in the 2010 U.S. census.

=== Racial and ethnic composition ===
Enon CDP, Virginia – Racial and ethnic composition Note: the US Census treats Hispanic/Latino as an ethnic category. This table excludes Latinos from the racial categories and assigns them to a separate category. Hispanics/Latinos may be of any race.
| Race / Ethnicity (NH = Non-Hispanic) | Pop 2010 | Pop 2020 | % 2010 | % 2020 |
|---|---|---|---|---|
| White alone (NH) | 2,723 | 2,523 | 78.56% | 61.91% |
| Black or African American alone (NH) | 488 | 919 | 14.08% | 22.55% |
| Native American or Alaska Native alone (NH) | 6 | 7 | 0.17% | 0.17% |
| Asian alone (NH) | 48 | 114 | 1.38% | 2.80% |
| Native Hawaiian or Pacific Islander alone (NH) | 0 | 0 | 0.00% | 0.00% |
| Other race alone (NH) | 5 | 14 | 0.14% | 0.34% |
| Mixed race or Multiracial (NH) | 63 | 191 | 1.82% | 4.69% |
| Hispanic or Latino (any race) | 133 | 307 | 3.84% | 7.53% |
| Total | 3,466 | 4,075 | 100.00% | 100.00% |

=== 2020 census ===
As of the 2020 census, Enon had a population of 4,075. The median age was 38.0 years. 23.6% of residents were under the age of 18 and 14.6% of residents were 65 years of age or older. For every 100 females there were 88.6 males, and for every 100 females age 18 and over there were 83.9 males age 18 and over.

91.8% of residents lived in urban areas, while 8.2% lived in rural areas.

There were 1,659 households in Enon, of which 33.2% had children under the age of 18 living in them. Of all households, 44.8% were married-couple households, 16.8% were households with a male householder and no spouse or partner present, and 30.1% were households with a female householder and no spouse or partner present. About 25.6% of all households were made up of individuals and 8.9% had someone living alone who was 65 years of age or older.

There were 1,772 housing units, of which 6.4% were vacant. The homeowner vacancy rate was 2.9% and the rental vacancy rate was 4.5%.

Racial composition as of the 2020 census
| Race | Number | Percent |
|---|---|---|
| White | 2,580 | 63.3% |
| Black or African American | 937 | 23.0% |
| American Indian and Alaska Native | 18 | 0.4% |
| Asian | 114 | 2.8% |
| Native Hawaiian and Other Pacific Islander | 1 | 0.0% |
| Some other race | 144 | 3.5% |
| Two or more races | 281 | 6.9% |

=== Demographic estimates ===
Enon has 4,411 people living there according to recent community surveys in 2021. Of those 4,411 citizens, 62.3% are white, 20.4% are African-American, and 6.8% are other races. The median age for an Enon resident in 37.1 years old.

== Education ==
Enon is served by Chesterfield County Public Schools. Public schools include Elizabeth Davis Middle School, Elizabeth Scott Elementary, and Enon Elementary. High school students in Enon attend Thomas Dale High School.

== Location ==
The community is located near the intersection of East Hundred Road (State Route 10) and I-295 just south of the Varina-Enon Bridge. Recent industrial attractions include River’s Bend Business Center and the Meadowville Technology Center (which houses an Amazon.com Fulfillment Center, Virginia IT Agency, Chirisa Capital Management, Cartograf, Niagara Bottling facility, Meldine, LEGO manufacturing, nearby areas also are home to Altria, and AdvanSix.
