= Poplar Grove National Cemetery =

Historic veterans cemetery in Dinwiddie County, Virginia

Coordinates: 37°09′36″N 77°25′42″W

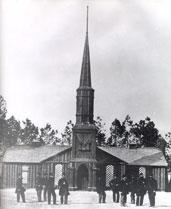
Poplar Grove Church

Poplar Grove National Cemetery is near Petersburg, Virginia, and is managed as part of Petersburg National Battlefield.

== A Nation's Need ==
In July 1862, Congress passed legislation giving the President of the United States the authority to purchase land for the establishment of cemeteries "for the soldiers who shall die in the service of their country." This legislation effectively began the National Cemetery system.

== A soldier's burial ==
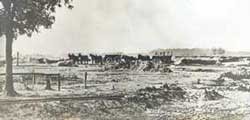
Burial in combat zone at Petersburg

At Petersburg, implementation of this system did not begin until 1866. During the Siege of Petersburg, Union soldiers who were killed in battle were hastily buried near where the fighting took place, some in single shallow pits, others in mass graves. Identification was as simple as a name carved on a wooden headboard, if there was time to leave even that. Most of these soldiers were not given a proper burial, save what their comrades could provide by saying a few words over them. Some units, like the IX Corps, had small cemeteries near their filled hospitals for soldiers who died while in their care.

== A final resting place ==
In 1866, Lt. Colonel James Moore began his survey of the Petersburg area to locate land for a National Cemetery. Eventually, a farm just south of the city was chosen. This tract of land had been the campground for the 50th New York Volunteer Engineers. During the war they constructed a Gothic Revival pine-log church called Poplar Grove.

With the cemetery now established, work began to move approximately 5,000 Union soldiers from nearly 100 separate burial sites around Petersburg. Bodies were moved from nine Virginia counties, reaching as far west as Lynchburg, Virginia.

About 100 men comprised the "burial corps." With ten army wagons, forty mules, and twelve saddle horses, these men began their search and recovery mission. One observer noted, "a hundred men were deployed in a line a yard apart, each examining half a yard of ground on both sides as they proceeded. Thus was swept a space five hundred yards in breadth . . .In this manner the whole battlefield was to be searched. When a grave was found, the entire line halted until the teams came up and the body was removed. Many graves were marked with stakes, but some were to be discovered only by the disturbed appearance of the ground. Those bodies which had been buried in trenches were but little decomposed, while those buried singly in boxes, not much was left but bones and dust." Remains were placed in a plain wooden coffin; if there was a headboard, it was attached to it. The burial corps worked for three years until 1869. In that time they reinterred 6,718 remains, of which only 2,139 bodies were positively identified.

Much the same fate was suffered by the nearly 30,000 Confederate dead buried at Blandford Cemetery in Petersburg. Of them, only about 2,000 names are known.

In 1933 responsibility of the cemetery was transferred from the War Department to the National Park Service (NPS). Poplar Grove is one of fourteen National Cemeteries administered by the NPS. It is closed for burials, but visitors are invited to walk the grounds, which are open daily.

== Medal of Honor recipients ==
Two Union Army Medal of Honor recipients are buried at Popular Grove. They are Sergeant Lewis R. Morgan (1836–1864) of the 4th Ohio Infantry and Private Henry M. Hardenbergh (1843–1864) of the 39th Illinois Infantry.
