= Appomattox Manor =

Historic house in Virginia, US

- U.S. National Register of Historic Places
- U.S. Historic district – Contributing property
- Virginia Landmarks Register
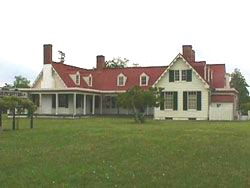
- Appomattox Manor

- Location within Virginia Location within the United States
- Location: Cedar Lane, at confluence of James and Appomattox Rivers, Hopewell, Virginia
- Coordinates: 37°19′0″N 77°16′38″W
- Area: 10 acres (4.0 ha)
- Built: 1751
- NRHP reference No.: 69000015
- VLR No.: 116-0001

Significant dates
- Added to NRHP: October 01, 1969
- Designated VLR: November 5, 1968

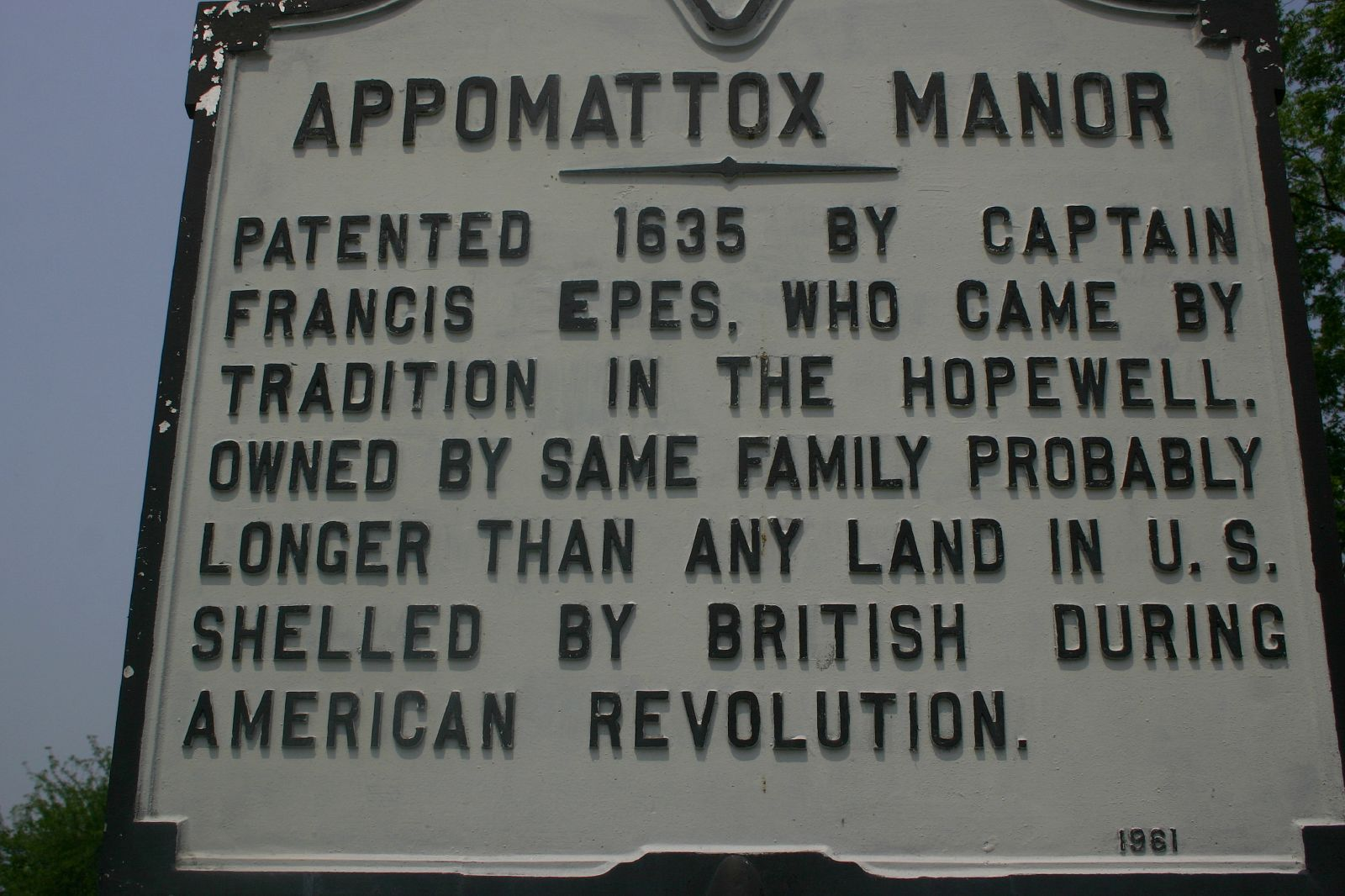
Appomattox Manor marker

Appomattox Manor is a former plantation house in Hopewell, Virginia, United States. It is best known as the Union headquarters during the Siege of Petersburg in 1864–65.

The restored c. 1751 manor house on a bluff overlooking the confluence of the James River and Appomattox River, and the grounds are managed by the National Park Service. The museum there, Grant's Headquarters at City Point Museum, is a unit of the Petersburg National Battlefield Park.

== Before the war ==
The Eppes family home was a century old by the time Union forces occupied the site in 1864. It had been built on a large tract of land acquired by Captain Francis Eppes in 1635 and by the time of the American Civil War it was the center of a plantation covering more than 2,300 acres (9.3 km^{2}).

== The war years ==
In 1861 Appomattox Plantation was owned by Dr. Richard Eppes. Though he owned three plantations and nearly 130 slaves, Dr. Eppes was not a strong secessionist. Yet when Virginia cast her lot with the South he took up arms by joining a local cavalry unit. He soon left the army to become a contract surgeon at a Confederate hospital in Petersburg. The Eppes family remained at their home until 1862 when the arrival of Union gunboats on the James River forced them to flee their home for the safety of Petersburg. Soon thereafter nearly all of their slaves left with those Union forces. When the war came to Petersburg two years later Mrs. Eppes and the children fled again, this time to her mother's home in Philadelphia, Pennsylvania.

Appomattox Plantation was used as the offices of U.S. Quartermaster Rufus Ingalls and his staff during the siege. City Point was a port on the James River. During the last years of the Civil War, from the port there, the City Point Railroad was used to support the Union forces during the Siege of Petersburg 1864–65. The successful capture of Petersburg and its network of railroads was the key to the fall of the Confederate capital city of Richmond, ending the war less than a week later.

After the surrender, when Dr. Eppes returned he found his house in near ruin and his plantation nearly destroyed. Not until March 1866 with the last Union regiments gone and the property back in his name did his wife and children return home to pick up the pieces and start anew.

It was listed on the National Register of Historic Places in 1969. The manor house and surrounding land was donated to the National Park Service by the Eppes family. It is located in the City Point Historic District.
