= Virginia State Route 36 =

State highway in eastern Virginia, US

State Route 36

Route information
- Maintained by VDOT
- Length: 16.70 mi (26.88 km)
- Existed: July 1, 1933–present

Major junctions
- West end: SR 602 / SR 669 near Matoaca
- US 1 / US 301 in Petersburg; I-85 / I-95 in Petersburg; SR 144 in Fort Gregg-Adams; I-295 in Hopewell; SR 156 in Hopewell
- East end: SR 10 in Hopewell

Location
- Country: United States
- State: Virginia
- Counties: Chesterfield, City of Petersburg, Prince George, City of Hopewell

Highway system
- Virginia Routes; Interstate; US; Primary; Secondary; Byways; History; HOT lanes
← SR 35	→ SR 37

State Route 36 (SR 36) is a state highway in the U.S. state of Virginia. The state highway runs 16.70 miles (26.88 km) from SR 602 and SR 669 near Matoaca east to SR 10 in Hopewell. SR 36 is the main highway between Petersburg and Hopewell; within each independent city, the state highway follows a complicated path. The state highway connects those cities with Ettrick in southern Chesterfield County and Fort Gregg-Adams and Petersburg National Battlefield in Prince George County.

== Route description ==
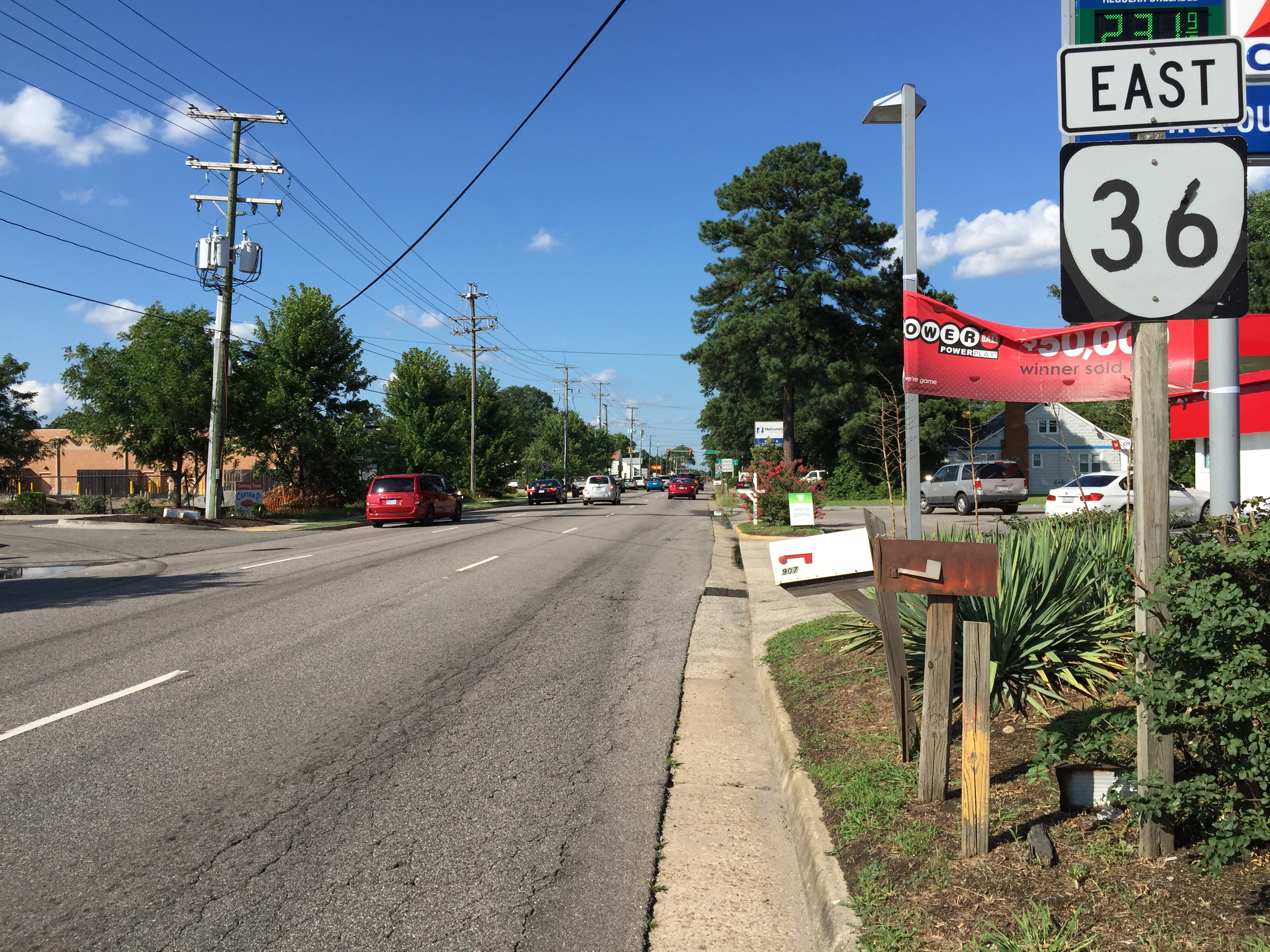
View east along SR 36 in Hopewell

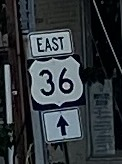
SR 36 being erroneously signed as a U. S. highway in Petersburg

SR 36 begins west of Matoaca at an intersection with a pair of secondary state highways: SR 669, which heads north as Church Road; and SR 602, which heads west as River Road toward Winterpock and Amelia Court House. SR 36 heads east as River Road, which parallels the north side of the Appomattox River at the southern edge of Chesterfield County. The state highway expands to a four-lane divided highway at Ettrick, where the highway crosses over CSX's North End Subdivision. SR 36 crosses the tracks just south of Petersburg Amtrak station. The state highway continues southeast along two-lane undivided Chesterfield Avenue and passes the campus of Virginia State University before crossing the Appomattox River into the city of Petersburg. SR 36 enters Petersburg on Fleet Street, then immediately turns east onto Grove Avenue to head toward Old Towne Petersburg.

At Market Street, the two directions of SR 36 split and follow many different streets through the downtown area. Eastbound SR 36 joins southbound US 1 on Market Street south to Washington Street, which is one-way eastbound and carries westbound US 460 Business. SR 36 continues south another block to Wythe Street, where the highway turns onto the four-lane eastbound street to head east with eastbound US 460 Business and northbound US 1. At Sycamore Street, the three highways are joined by northbound US 301 Alternate to Adams Street, where northbound US 1 and the northbound alternate route head north. SR 36 and US 460 Business continue east through their interchange with I-95 and I-85 (Richmond–Petersburg Turnpike); the latter Interstate has its northern terminus immediately south of the interchange and has direct ramps with Wythe Street and Washington Street. At Crater Road, SR 36 intersects US 301 and US 460 Business turns south. The two directions of SR 36 come together near Amelia Street.

Westbound SR 36 follows Washington Street to Crater Road, onto which the state highway turns north and joins US 301. Access to I-95 and I-85 is provided by westbound US 460 Business, which takes over Washington Street. At the north end of Crater Street, SR 36 and US 301 turn west onto Bollingbrook Street and pass under I-95. At Adams Street, US 301 turns north to cross the Martin Luther King Jr. Memorial Bridge to leave Petersburg; southbound US 1 joins SR 36 west to Sycamore Street. The two highways turn north onto Sycamore Street to the City Market building, then turn west onto Old Street to Market Street, where the two directions of SR 36 come together at the western end of the split.

SR 36 heads east from the joining of Wythe and Washington streets as four-lane divided Washington Street, which crosses over a Norfolk Southern Railway rail line and crosses Harrison Creek into Prince George County. The state highway continues northeast as Oaklawn Boulevard through a portion of Petersburg National Battlefield; the highway has a trumpet interchange with a park access road. SR 36 heads through Fort Gregg-Adams, where the highway passes several entrances to the U.S. Army installation, including one opposite SR 144 (Temple Avenue). Fort Gregg-Adams is home to the United States Army Women's Museum, Army Quartermaster Museum, and Kenner Army Health Clinic. East of the fort, SR 36 becomes six lanes and meets I-295 at a cloverleaf interchange on the boundary of Prince George County and the city of Hopewell.

East of I-295, SR 36 splits into a one-way pair, Oaklawn Boulevard eastbound and Woodlawn Street westbound. The two directions rejoin at Kenwood Avenue and become Winston Churchill Drive, which reduces to four lanes at an intersection with an unnumbered section of Oaklawn Boulevard that parallels the north side of the state highway. SR 36 has a short concurrency with SR 156 between where the latter highway splits south at High Avenue and SR 36's turn north onto Arlington Road. The state highway turns again onto 15th Street, which the highway follows to cross two separate rail lines and pass through a roundabout with Lynchburg Street and Maryland Avenue. South of City Point National Cemetery, SR 36 turns east onto Broadway Avenue. On the west side of downtown Hopewell, the state highway turns north onto 6th Street, which the highway follows to its northern terminus at an oblique intersection with SR 10 (Randolph Road).

== History ==
The road from State Route 10 (at a point now just west of Lee Avenue in Fort Gregg-Adams) east of Petersburg northeast to Hopewell was added to the state highway system in 1924 as State Route 1011. SR 1011 became State Route 408 in the 1928 renumbering. 6.70 miles (10.78 km) from Campbells Bridge over the Appomattox River at Petersburg past Matoaca towards Winterpock was added in 1928 as State Route 409. SR 409 was extended 3.02 miles (4.86 km) in 1930.

== Major intersections ==
County	Location	mi	km	Destinations	Notes
Chesterfield		0.00	0.00	SR 602 (River Road) / SR 669 (Church Road) – Amelia	Western terminus
Chesterfield	Matoaca			SR 600 (Pickett Avenue) to US 1	
City of Petersburg		7.01	11.28	US 1 south / US 460 Bus. west (West Washington Street)	eastbound only; west end of US 1 north / US 460 Bus. east overlap
City of Petersburg		7.21	11.60	US 301 Alt. south (South Sycamore Street)	eastbound only; west end of US 301 Alt. north overlap
City of Petersburg		7.41	11.93	US 1 north / US 301 Alt. north (South Adams Street)	eastbound only; east end of US 1 north / US 301 Alt. north overlap
City of Petersburg				US 1 / US 301 / SR 36 Truck west (North Adams Street)	westbound only; west end of US 301 north overlap
City of Petersburg		7.61	12.25	I-95 / I-85 south – Richmond	eastbound only; I-95 exits 50D (northbound) and 52 (southbound); I-85 exit 69
City of Petersburg		7.91	12.73	US 301 / US 460 Bus. east (South Crater Road) to US 1 north	eastbound only; east end of US 460 Bus. east overlap
City of Petersburg				US 301 south / US 460 Bus. (South Crater Road / East Washington Street)	westbound only; east end of US 301 north overlap
Prince George				Petersburg National Battlefield	interchange
Prince George		11.80	18.99	SR 144 north (Temple Avenue) to I-95 – Colonial Heights	
City of Hopewell		12.00	19.31	I-295 – Washington, Rocky Mount, NC	I-295 exit 9
City of Hopewell		14.59	23.48	SR 156 Bus. south (High Avenue) to US 460 / US 301	west end of SR 156 Bus. overlap
City of Hopewell		14.84	23.88	SR 156 Bus. north (Winston Churchill Drive)	east end of SR 156 Bus. overlap
City of Hopewell		16.70	26.88	SR 10 (Randolph Road)	Eastern terminus
1.000 mi = 1.609 km; 1.000 km = 0.621 mi: Concurrency terminus

== Special routes ==
=== Petersburg Truck Route ===
State Route 36 Truck
- Location: Petersburg

Virginia Truck Route 36 runs south of where VA 36 turns east from Fleet Street to Grove Avenue and immediately moves to Canal Street. After the intersection with High Street it turns left onto South Street, then moves onto a one-way pair along West Washington and West Wythe Streets, where it is partially overlapped by US 1/BUS 460. The streets become East Washington and East Wythe Streets at the intersection with US 301 Alternate. One block later, the concurrency with US BUS 460 ends at Adams Street and US 1/VA Truck 36 turn north, and are also joined by US 301 which followed US BUS 460 from the opposite direction. Four blocks north along the concurrency with US 1/301, VA Truck Route 36 ends at VA 36 on Bank Street, while US 1 and 301 continue to overlap each other towards Richmond.

Truck SR 36 is not an official route in the VDOT route numbering system.

< SR 1010	Spurs of SR 10; 1923–1928	SR 1012 >
< SR 407	District 4 State Routes; 1928–1933	SR 410 >
