= Virginia State Route 145 =

State highway in Virginia, United States

State Route 145

Route information
- Maintained by VDOT
- Length: 5.18 mi (8.34 km)
- Existed: 1933–present

Major junctions
- West end: SR 10 in Chesterfield
- SR 144 / SR 717 in Centralia; SR 288 near Centralia
- East end: US 1 / US 301 / SR 656 in Bellwood

Location
- Country: United States
- State: Virginia
- Counties: Chesterfield

Highway system
- Virginia Routes; Interstate; US; Primary; Secondary; Byways; History; HOT lanes
← SR 144	→ SR 146

State Route 145 (SR 145) is a primary state highway in the U.S. state of Virginia. The state highway runs 5.18 miles (8.34 km) from SR 10 in Chesterfield east to U.S. Route 1 and US 301 in Bellwood in eastern Chesterfield County.

== Route description ==
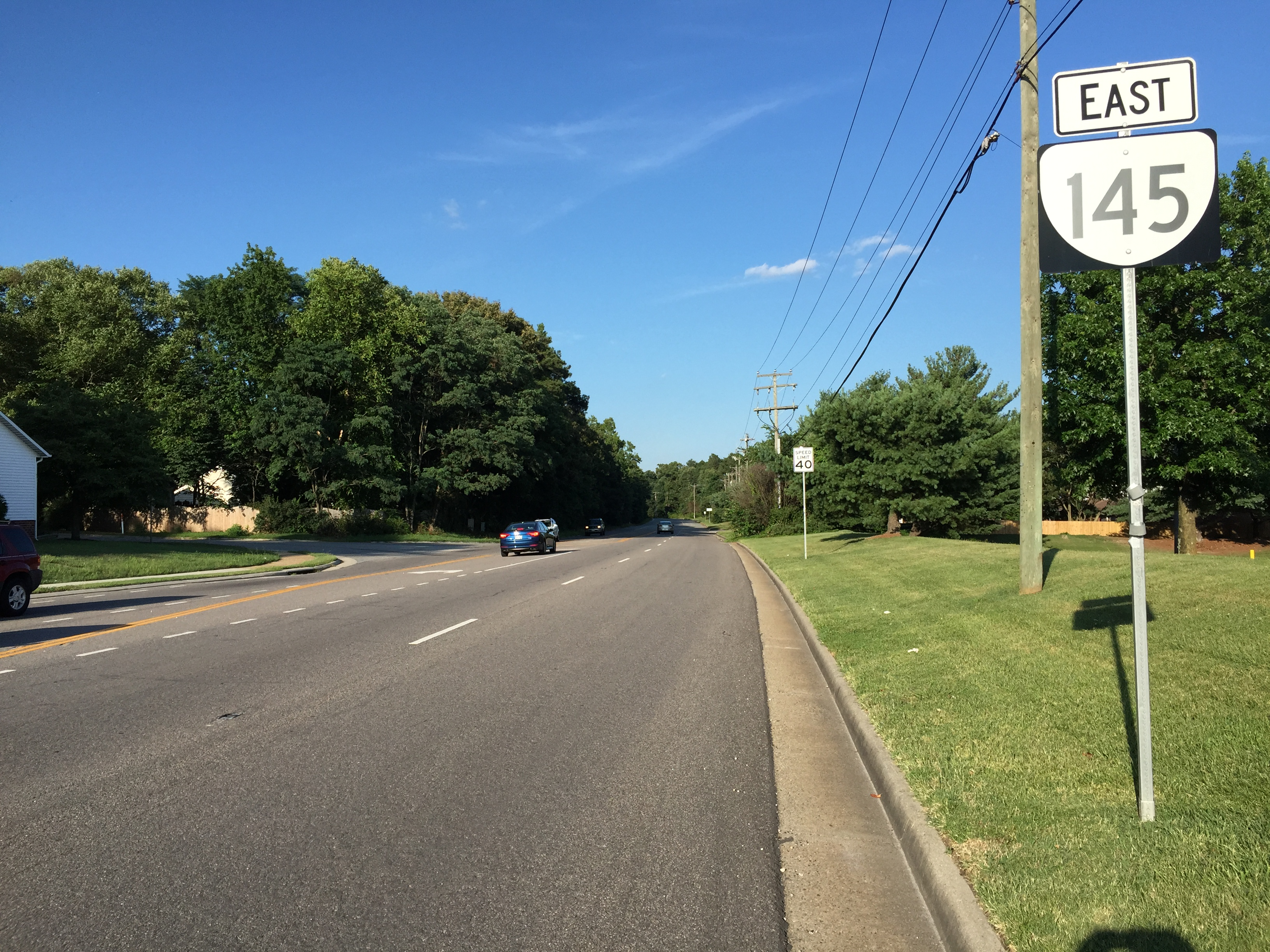
View east at the west end of SR 145 at SR 10 in Chesterfield

SR 145 begins at an intersection with SR 10 (Iron Bridge Road) in Chesterfield. The state highway heads east as two-lane undivided Centralia Road toward the hamlet of Centralia, where the highway has a grade crossing of CSX's North End Subdivision. Just east of the railroad crossing, SR 145 meets the northern end of SR 144 (Chester Road). SR 145 turns north onto Chester Road, which is a four-lane divided highway from just south of the SR 144–SR 145 intersection to north of the state highway's diamond interchange with the SR 288 freeway. North of the freeway, SR 145 closely parallels CSX's Bellwood Subdivision rail line northeast to Bellwood. There, the highway veers east and makes a 90-degree turn north at Perrymont Road. SR 145 veers east again and reaches its northern terminus at US 1 and US 301 (Jefferson Davis Highway).

== History ==
SR 145 was added to the state highway system in 1924 as State Route 313, a spur of State Route 31 (now US 1/301). It became State Route 410 in the 1928 renumbering and State Route 145 in the 1933 renumbering.

== Major intersections ==
The entire route is in Chesterfield County.

Location	mi	km	Destinations	Notes
Chesterfield	0.00	0.00	SR 10 (Ironbridge Road)	Western terminus
Centralia	2.81	4.52	SR 144 south (Chester Road) / Centralia Road (SR 717) – Chester	
Centralia			SR 288	Diamond interchange
Chimney Corner	5.18	8.34	US 1 / US 301 (Jefferson Davis Highway) / SR 656 east (Bellwood Road)	Eastern terminus
1.000 mi = 1.609 km; 1.000 km = 0.621 mi

< SR 312	Spurs of SR 31; 1923–1928	SR 314 >
< SR 409	District 4 State Routes; 1928–1933	SR 411 >
