= Virginia State Route 144 =

State highway in eastern Virginia, US

State Route 144

Route information
- Maintained by VDOT
- Length: 13.97 mi (22.48 km)
- Existed: 1933–present

Major junctions
- East end: SR 36 at Fort Gregg-Adams
- I-95 in Colonial Heights; US 1 / US 301 in Colonial Heights; SR 10 in Chester
- North end: SR 145 / SR 717 at Centralia

Location
- Country: United States
- State: Virginia
- Counties: Prince George, City of Colonial Heights, Chesterfield

Highway system
- Virginia Routes; Interstate; US; Primary; Secondary; Byways; History; HOT lanes
← SR 143	→ SR 145

State Route 144 (SR 144) is a primary state highway in the U.S. state of Virginia. The state highway runs 13.97 miles (22.48 km) from SR 36 at Fort Gregg-Adams north to SR 145 at Centralia. SR 144's east–west segment is the main highway between Colonial Heights and both Fort Gregg-Adams and Hopewell. The state highway's north–south section connects U.S. Route 1 (US 1) and US 301 in Colonial Heights with SR 10 in Chester. A section of it was first added to the state highway system in 1930, and it gained its current routing and designation by 1987.

== Route description ==
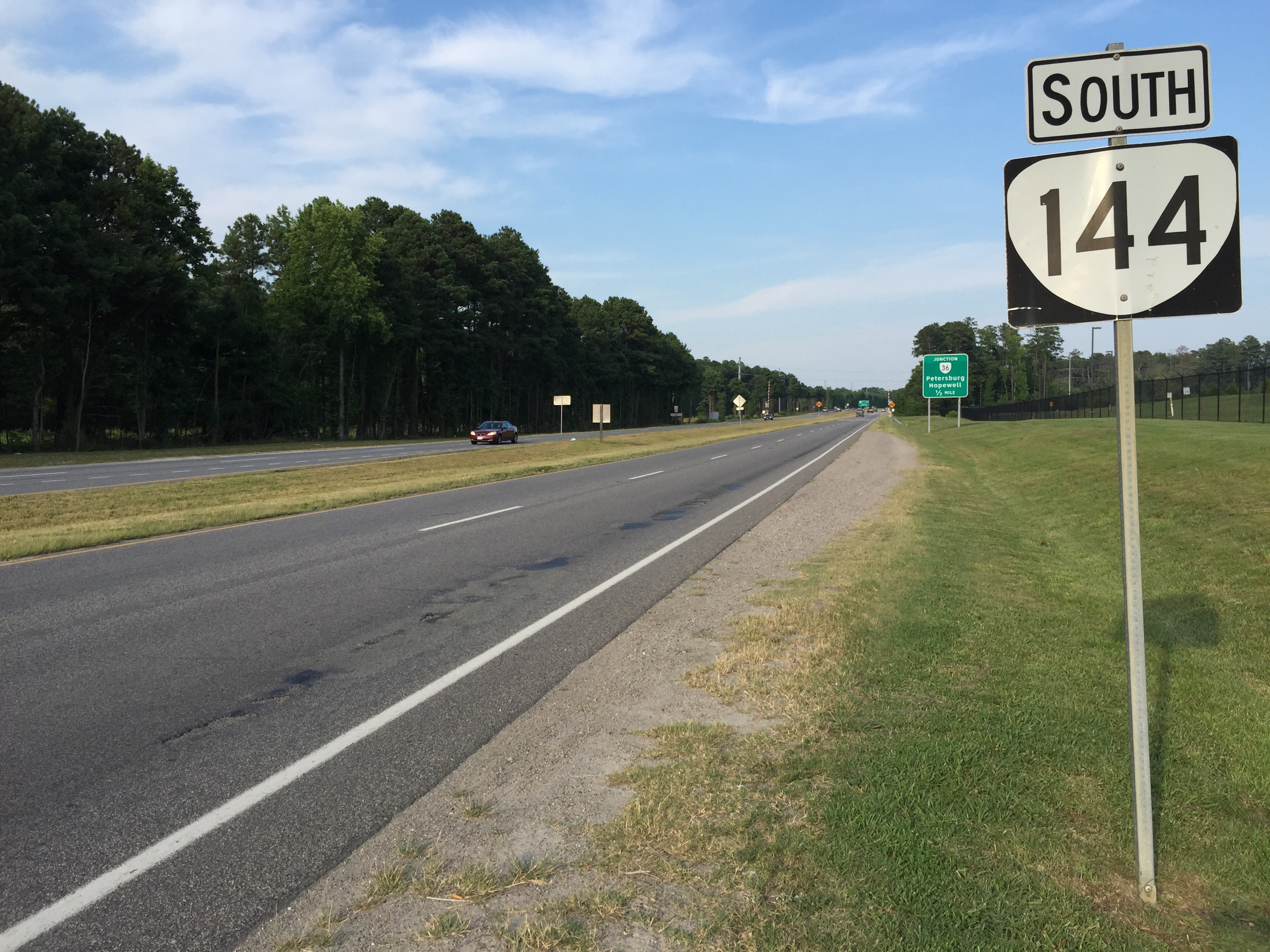
View south along SR 144 in Fort Gregg-Adams

SR 144 begins at a four-way intersection with SR 36 (Oaklawn Boulevard) at the northeastern corner of Fort Gregg-Adams. The south leg of the intersection is Sisisky Boulevard, which serves as one of the entrances to the military base. SR 144 heads west as Temple Avenue, a four-lane divided highway that crosses a rail line and passes through an industrial area in far northern Prince George County before crossing the Appomattox River, which is split in two by Halls Island. While crossing the river, the state highway passes through a sliver of Chesterfield County before entering the independent city of Colonial Heights. SR 144 passes through a commercial area that includes the Southpark Mall and the world's largest Arby's restaurant. West of the mall, the state highway has a trumpet interchange with Interstate 95 (I-95, Richmond–Petersburg Turnpike) that is supplemented by a ramp from northbound SR 144 to northbound I-95. West of the freeway, SR 144 reaches the western end of Temple Avenue and turns north to run concurrently with US 1 and US 301 along the city's main north–south thoroughfare, Boulevard.

SR 144, US 1, and US 301 follow Boulevard north through Colonial Heights, where the five-lane highway with a center left-turn lane passes under CSX's North End Subdivision. The highways enter Chesterfield County by crossing Swift Creek into Chesterfield County and become Jefferson Davis Highway. SR 144 splits northwest from the U.S. Highways to follow two-lane undivided Harrowgate Road through a suburban area to Chester. There, the state highway has a brief concurrency with four-lane undivided SR 10 (West Hundred Road) to cross the North End Subdivision rail line. SR 144 continues north on two-lane undivided Chester Road, which the highway follows to its northern terminus at SR 145 at Centralia. SR 145 heads west as Centralia Road toward Chesterfield Court House and north as a continuation of Chester Road through an interchange with the SR 288 freeway.

== History ==
What would become SR 144 was first commissioned in 1930 as State Route 425 (SR 425). It was significantly shorter than today's route, only running 2 miles (3.2 km) from State Route 407 in Chester to State Route 410 in Centralia. The route was given its current designation during the 1933 Virginia state highway renumbering. In 1943, it was extended west along SR 407 for a short length, then 5.3 miles (8.5 km) south to US 1 and US 301 using the routing of what was at the time State Route 621, a secondary road; the Commonwealth Transportation Board's justification for replacing it with SR 144 was that it was "a heavily traveled feeder road serving a rapidly developing portion of [Chesterfield County]". In 1987, SR 144 was again extended a total of 3.3 miles (5.3 km); first south along US 1 and US 301 from its previous terminus and then east along Temple Avenue to its current terminus at SR 36.

== Major intersections ==
County	Location	mi	km	Destinations	Notes
Prince George	Fort Gregg-Adams	0.00	0.00	SR 36 (Oaklawn Boulevard) to I-295 – Hopewell, Lee Gate, Petersburg, Sisisky Gate	Southern terminus
City of Colonial Heights		4.07	6.55	I-95 to I-85 – Petersburg, Richmond	I-95 exit 54
City of Colonial Heights		4.57	7.35	US 1 south / US 301 south (Boulevard) – Petersburg, Virginia State University	South end of US 1 / US 301 overlap
Chesterfield	Pickadat Corner	6.51	10.48	US 1 north / US 301 north (Jefferson Davis Highway) – Richmond	North end of US 1 / US 301 overlap
Chesterfield	Chester	11.95	19.23	SR 10 west (West Hundred Road) – Richmond	South end of SR 10 overlap
Chesterfield	Chester	12.20	19.63	SR 10 east (West Hundred Road) / SR 1515 (Winfree Street) – Hopewell	North end of SR 10 overlap
Chesterfield	Centralia	13.97	22.48	SR 145 (Centralia Road / Chester Road / SR 717)	Northern terminus
1.000 mi = 1.609 km; 1.000 km = 0.621 mi: Concurrency terminus

< SR 424	District 4 State Routes; 1928–1933	SR 426 >
