= Centralia, Virginia =

Unincorporated community in Virginia, United States

- Unincorporated community
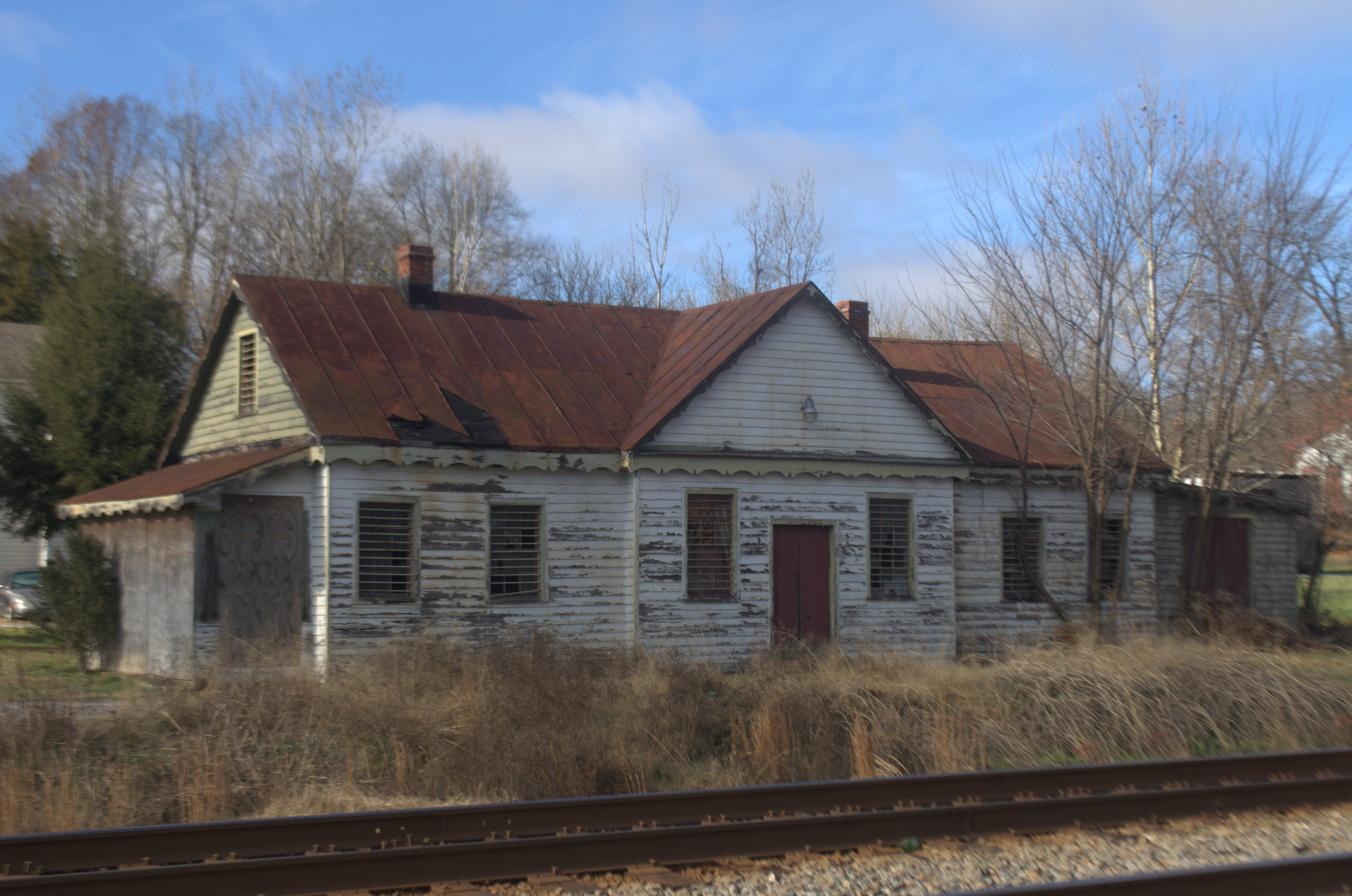
- Centralia Station
- Interactive map of Centralia, Virginia
- Coordinates: 37.3809821°N 77.4599845°W
- Country: United States
- State: Virginia
- County: Chesterfield
- Time zone: UTC−5 (Eastern (EST))
  - Summer (DST): UTC−4 (EDT)
- ZIP codes: 23831
- GNIS feature ID: 1492739

Centralia is an unincorporated community located in Chesterfield County, Virginia, United States. The community is situated at the intersection of state routes 145 and 144. It was so named because it was located at the midpoint of the old Richmond and Petersburg Railroad, later the Atlantic Coast Line Railroad and today owned and operated by CSX.

A historical marker was erected in 2014 by The Department of Historic Resources. The marker says:

"In 1867, the African American members of nearby Salem Baptist Church separated and founded Salem African Baptist Church. The new congregation held worship services under a brush arbor before constructing a building here on a one-acre tract deeded in 1869 by members of the mother church. The congregation soon changed its name to First Baptist Church (Centralia). Early in the 20th century, members erected a large new sanctuary incorporating elements of the Gothic Revival and Colonial Revival styles. Razed by fire in 1996, this structure was rebuilt to original specifications in 1997, In 1963, the growing congregation moved two miles east."
