= Garysville, Virginia =

Garysville
- Unincorporated community
- Location within the Commonwealth of Virginia Garysville (the United States)
- Coordinates: 37°15′00″N 77°09′28″W
- Country: United States
- State: Virginia
- County: Prince George
- Elevation: 43 ft (13 m)
- Time zone: UTC−5 (Eastern (EST))
  - Summer (DST): UTC−4 (EDT)
- GNIS feature ID: 1477341

Garysville is an unincorporated community in Prince George County, Virginia, United States. It is located on State Route 10, approximately 12 miles east of Petersburg.

The Flowerdew Hundred Plantation, listed on the National Register of Historic Places, is located in Garysville.
