= Meadowbrook, Virginia =

Meadowbrook
- CDP
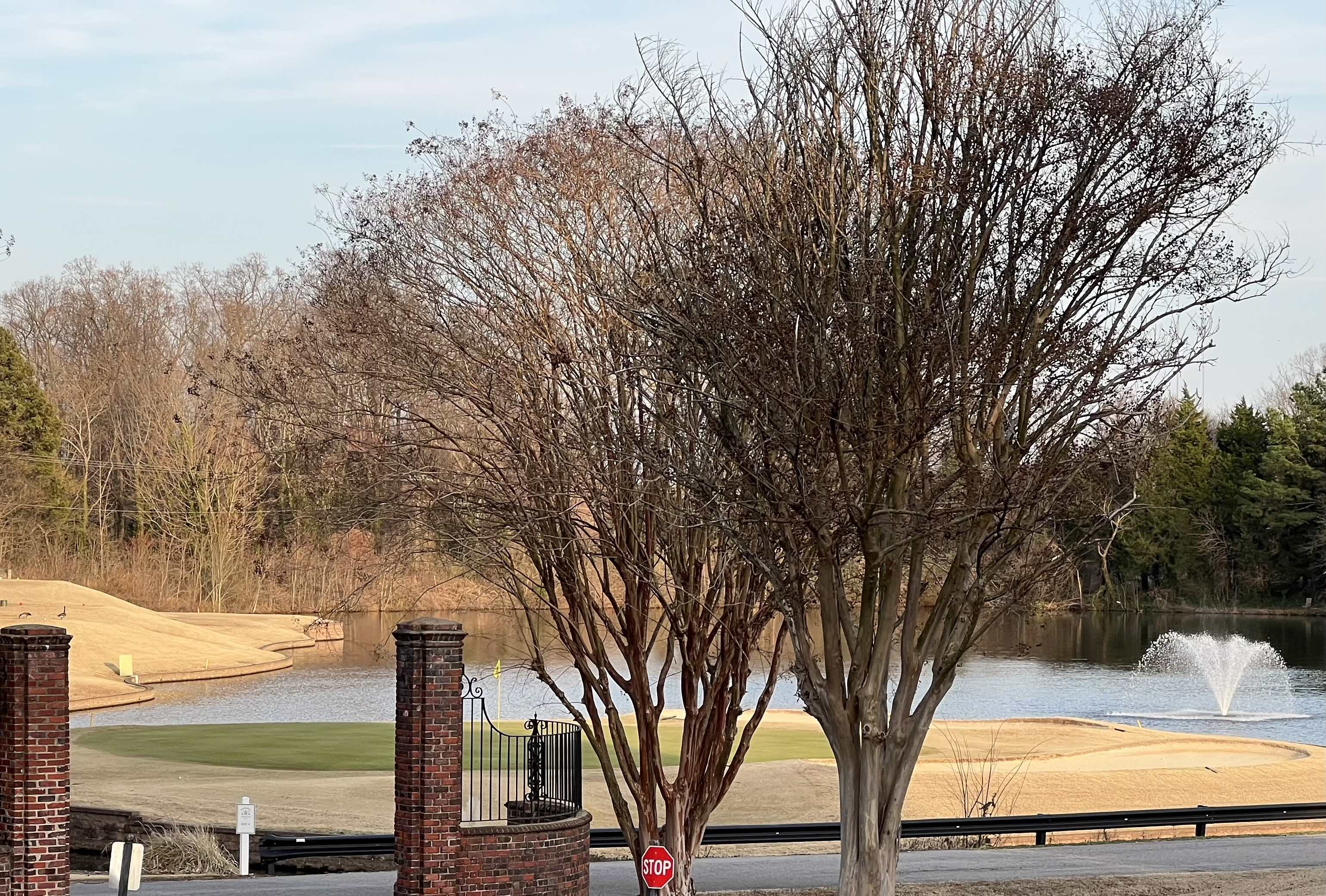
- Meadowbrook Country Club

- Location within the Commonwealth of Virginia
- Coordinates: 37°25′50″N 77°28′28″W
- Country: United States
- State: Virginia
- County: Chesterfield

Population (2020)
  - Total: 20,898
- Time zone: UTC−5 (Eastern (EST))
  - Summer (DST): UTC−4 (EDT)
- ZIP codes: 23234, 23237
- FIPS code: 51-50568
- GNIS feature ID: 2584878

Meadowbrook is a census-designated place in Chesterfield County, Virginia, United States. As of the 2020 census, Meadowbrook had a population of 20,898. It is named after the old Meadowbrook Farm owned by the Jeffress family, which later turned into the Meadowbrook Country Club.

== Demographics ==
Historical population
Census	Pop.	Note	%±
2010	18,312		—
2020	20,898		14.1%
U.S. Decennial Census; 2010 2020

Meadowbrook was first listed as a census designated place in the 2010 U.S. census.

=== Racial and ethnic composition ===
Meadowbrook CDP, Virginia – Racial and ethnic composition Note: the US Census treats Hispanic/Latino as an ethnic category. This table excludes Latinos from the racial categories and assigns them to a separate category. Hispanics/Latinos may be of any race.
Race / Ethnicity (NH = Non-Hispanic)	Pop 2010	Pop 2020	% 2010	% 2020
White alone (NH)	6,507	5,162	35.53%	24.70%
Black or African American alone (NH)	7,755	8,293	42.35%	39.68%
Native American or Alaska Native alone (NH)	73	42	0.40%	0.20%
Asian alone (NH)	763	765	4.17%	3.66%
Native Hawaiian or Pacific Islander alone (NH)	12	7	0.07%	0.03%
Other race alone (NH)	30	174	0.16%	0.83%
Mixed race or Multiracial (NH)	359	723	1.96%	3.46%
Hispanic or Latino (any race)	2,813	5,732	15.36%	27.43%
Total	18,312	20,898	100.00%	100.00%

=== 2020 census ===
As of the 2020 census, Meadowbrook had a population of 20,898. The median age was 36.9 years. 23.9% of residents were under the age of 18 and 15.3% of residents were 65 years of age or older. For every 100 females there were 93.3 males, and for every 100 females age 18 and over there were 89.1 males age 18 and over.

100.0% of residents lived in urban areas, while 0.0% lived in rural areas.

There were 7,308 households in Meadowbrook, of which 36.4% had children under the age of 18 living in them. Of all households, 44.3% were married-couple households, 17.2% were households with a male householder and no spouse or partner present, and 31.6% were households with a female householder and no spouse or partner present. About 20.9% of all households were made up of individuals and 9.0% had someone living alone who was 65 years of age or older.

There were 7,603 housing units, of which 3.9% were vacant. The homeowner vacancy rate was 1.3% and the rental vacancy rate was 3.8%.

Racial composition as of the 2020 census
Race	Number	Percent
White	5,620	26.9%
Black or African American	8,472	40.5%
American Indian and Alaska Native	163	0.8%
Asian	770	3.7%
Native Hawaiian and Other Pacific Islander	9	0.0%
Some other race	4,153	19.9%
Two or more races	1,711	8.2%
