= City Point Historic District =

Historic district in Virginia, United States

- U.S. National Register of Historic Places
- U.S. Historic district
- Virginia Landmarks Register
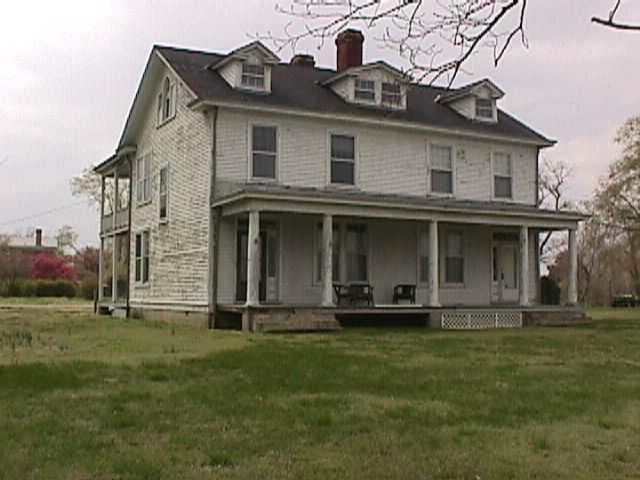
- Naldara, City Point Historic District, Petersburg National Battlefield

- Location within Virginia Location within the United States
- Location: Off VA 10/156, Hopewell, Virginia
- Coordinates: 37°18′53″N 77°16′32″W
- Area: 39 acres (16 ha)
- Built: 1630
- Architectural style: Mid 19th Century Revival, Federal
- NRHP reference No.: 79000248
- VLR No.: 116-0006

Significant dates
- Added to NRHP: October 15, 1979
- Designated VLR: September 19, 1978

City Point Historic District is a national historic district located at Hopewell, Virginia. The district encompasses 85 contributing buildings and 3 contributing sites at the tip of a peninsula at the confluence of the Appomattox River and James River. The district primarily includes one- and two-story, wood-frame single-family dwellings dated to the 19th century. Notable buildings include St. John's Episcopal Church (1840), Civil War Catholic Chapel (1865), the Cocke House (c. 1840, 1916), Miami Lodge (1912), Cook House (c. 1858), St. John's Rectory (c. 1848), and Christopher Proctor House (c. 1800). Located in the district and separately listed is Appomattox Manor.

It was listed on the National Register of Historic Places in 1979.
