= Petersburg National Battlefield =

United States Civil War site

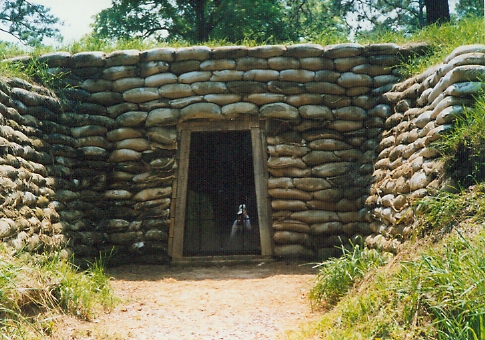
- Restored entrance to the mine destroyed in the Battle of the Crater

- Location within Virginia Location within the United States
- Location: Southeast Virginia, United States
- Nearest city: Petersburg, Virginia
- Coordinates: 37°13′10″N 77°21′41″W
- Area: 9,368 acres (37.91 km^{2})
- Established: July 3, 1926
- Visitors: 494,358 (in 2025)
- Governing body: National Park Service
- Website: Petersburg National Battlefield

U.S. National Register of Historic Places
- Designated: October 15, 1966
- Reference no.: 66000831

Petersburg National Battlefield is a National Park Service unit preserving sites related to the American Civil War Siege of Petersburg (1864–65). The battlefield is divided between unincorporated Prince George County, and the independent city of Petersburg, both in Virginia, and includes outlying components in Hopewell, Prince George County, and Dinwiddie County. Over 140,000 people visit the park annually.

== Park Units ==
Petersburg National Battlefield is composed of three major units and an additional managed component.

=== Eastern Front Visitor Center and Park Tour Road ===
Located off Virginia Route 36 east of Petersburg, the Eastern Front Visitor Center is the main visitor contact station for the Battlefield. Here, visitors can view exhibits and movies about the Siege of Petersburg as well as view Battery #5, an important early site in the Siege. From the Visitor Center, the park tour begins. The route runs from Virginia Route 36 to US Route 301. Sites on the tour include Fort Stedman and The Crater.

=== Five Forks Battlefield ===
Located in Dinwiddie County about 14 miles (23 km) southwest of downtown Petersburg, this unit contains the site of the Battle of Five Forks, which destroyed a sizable portion of the remaining Confederate Army of Northern Virginia. Sometimes called the "Waterloo of the Confederacy", Five Forks helped set in motion a series of events that led to Robert E. Lee's subsequent surrender at Appomattox Court House.

=== City Point Unit ===
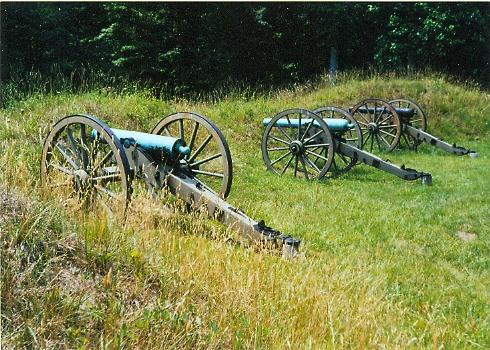
Battery XVI in the Main Unit

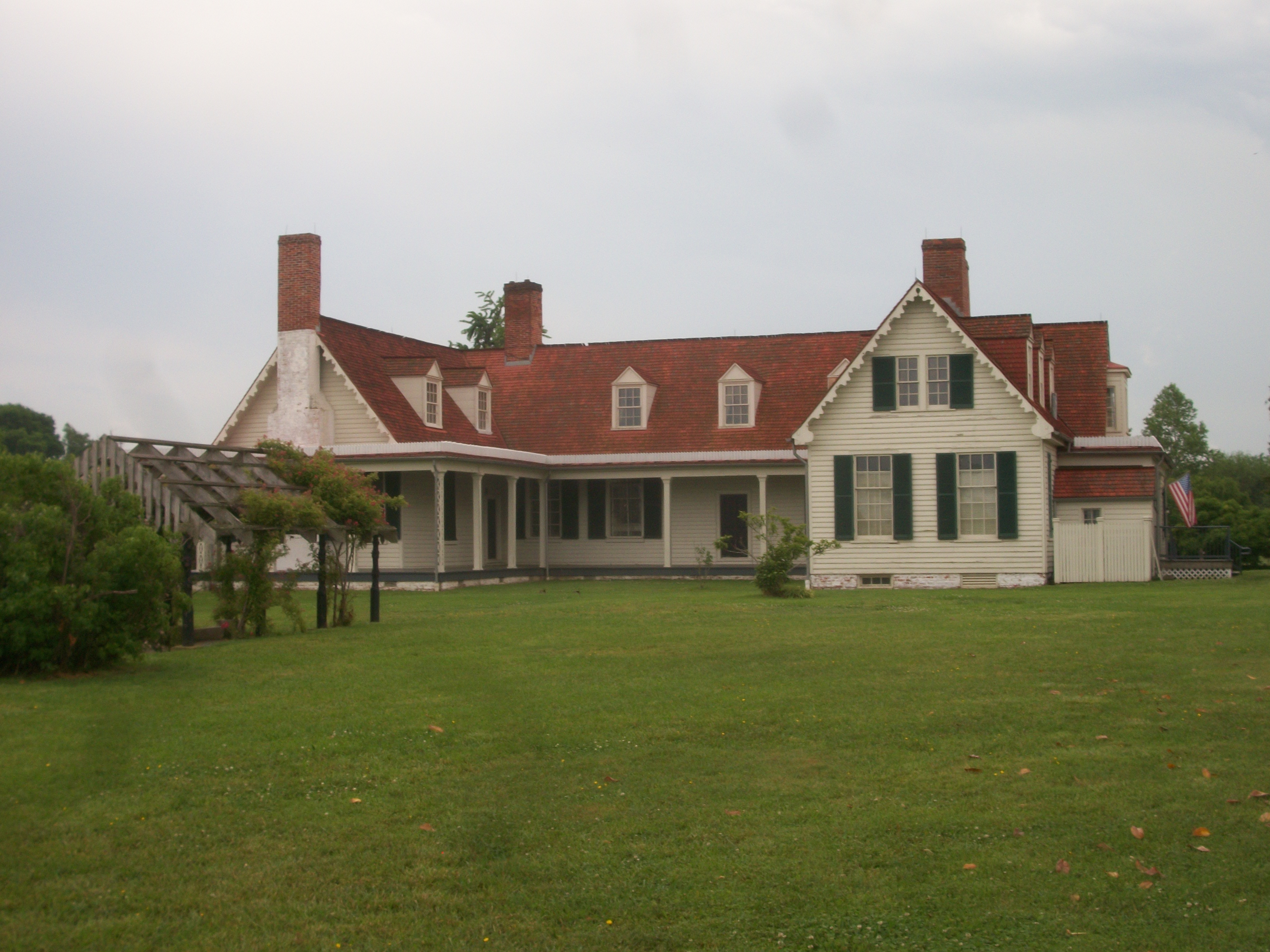
Grant's headquarters at the City Point unit.

Sited next to the James River in Hopewell, City Point served as a major command and logistics hub for the Union Army during the Siege of Petersburg. It is located in the City Point Historic District.

=== Poplar Grove National Cemetery ===
The 8.72-acre (3.53 ha) Poplar Grove National Cemetery is administered by Petersburg National Battlefield.

== History ==
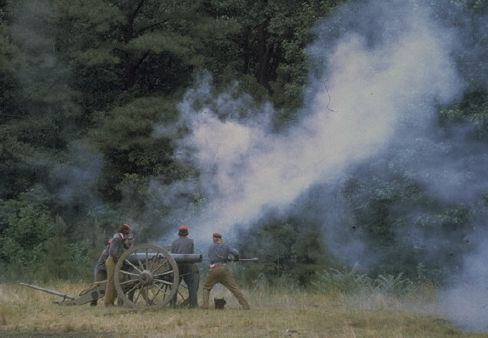
Reenactors at Petersburg National Battlefield.

- Established as Petersburg National Military Park on 1926-07-03.
- Transferred from the War Department on 1933-08-10.
- Redesignated as Petersburg National Battlefield on 1962-08-24.
- Added to the National Register of Historic Places on 1966-10-15.

== See also ==
- Richmond National Battlefield Park, administering areas related to the Siege of Petersburg which are north of the James River and Appomattox River.
