= Special routes of U.S. Route 258 =

Special routes of U.S. Route 258

Highway system
- United States Numbered Highway System; List; Special; Divided

Six special routes of U.S. Route 258 exist. In order from west to east, these special routes are as follows:

== North Carolina ==
=== Kinston business route ===
U.S. Highway 258 Business
- Location: Kinston, NC
- Length: 4.77 mi (7.68 km)

U.S. Route 258 Business (US 258 Business) is a business route of US 258 through Kinston, North Carolina. The highway runs 4.77 miles (7.68 km) entirely concurrent with US 70 Business from US 258, US 70, and NC 58 on the south side of Kinston to US 70 and US 258 on the west side of Kinston. US 258 Business and US 70 Business run concurrently with NC 58 across the Neuse River into downtown Kinston, in the center of which the highways intersect NC 11 and NC 55 (King Street). North of downtown, the business routes turn west onto Vernon Avenue while NC 58 continues north on Queen Street. US 258 Business and US 70 Business pass the exhibited remains of the CSS Neuse before they reach their common terminus at a directional intersection with US 258 and US 70.

=== Snow Hill truck route ===
U.S. Highway 258 Truck
- Location: Snow Hill, NC
- Length: 2.8 mi (4.5 km)

U.S. Route 258 Truck (US 258 Truck) is a truck route of US 258 bypassing east of downtown Snow Hill, North Carolina. The truck route travels 2.8 miles (4.5 km), overlapping NC 58, NC 903, and US 13.

=== Farmville business route ===
U.S. Highway 258 Business
- Location: Farmville, NC
- Length: 3.21 mi (5.17 km)

U.S. Route 258 Business (US 258 Business) is business route of US 258 that passes through Farmville, North Carolina. The route is the former mainline routing of US 258 through the town before it was routed onto the US 264 freeway north of the town. US 258 Business begins at the intersection of US 264 Alternate and US 258 within the town limits of Farmville. The route heads north on Main Street to the center of town where it reaches NC 121 (Wilson Street). The two highways form a concurrency and travel west along Wilson Street. After 0.48 miles (0.77 km), US 258 Business makes a right turn onto May Boulevard and exits the town. It ends at the US 264's exit 63 which is also where US 258 ends its concurrency with US 264 and returns to surface roads. In October 2022, AASHTO approved a request to eliminate this route.

== Virginia ==
=== Franklin business route ===
U.S. Route 258 Business
- Location: Franklin, VA
- Length: 3.74 mi (6.02 km)

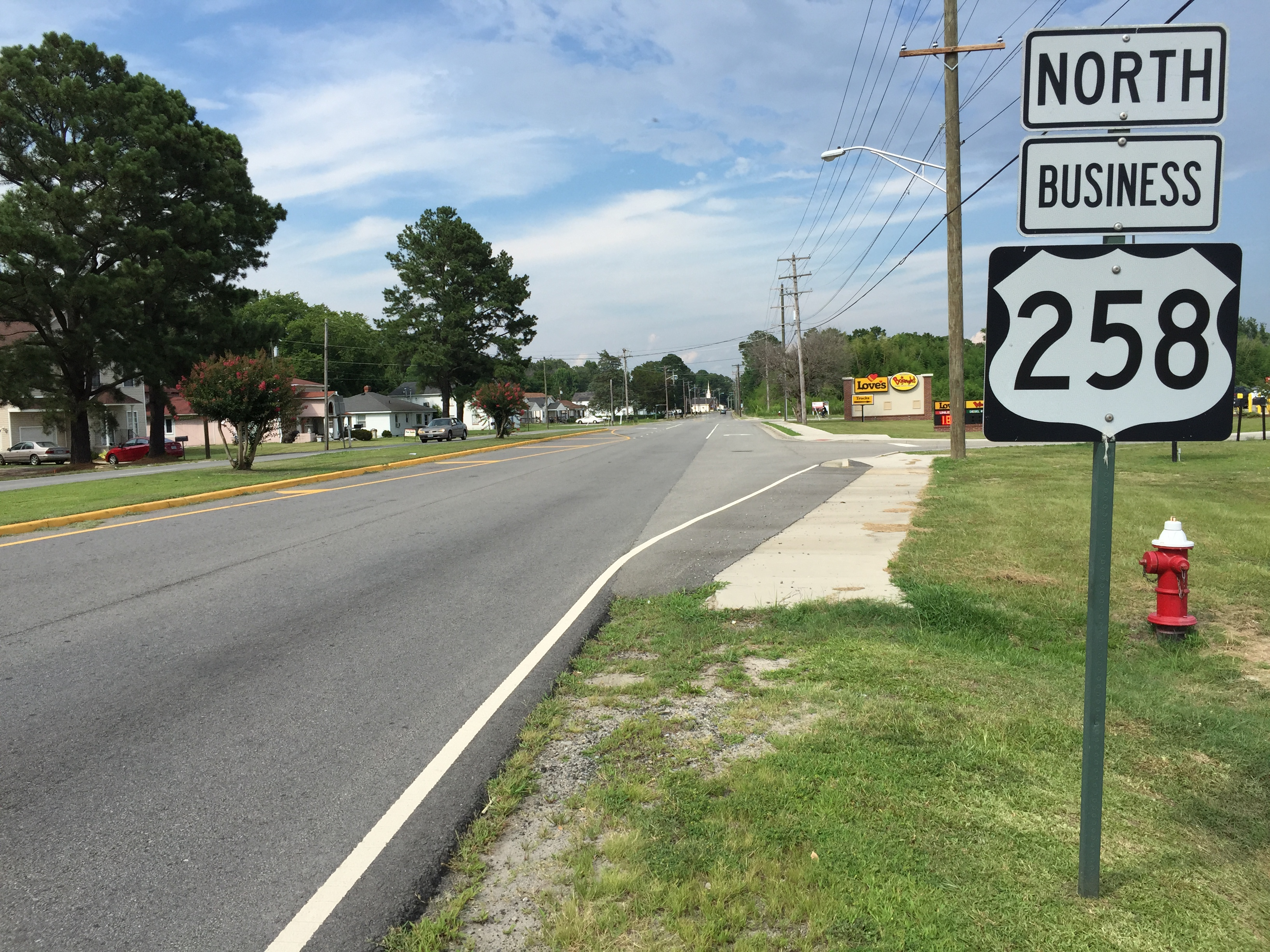
View north at the south end of US 258 Bus. at US 58/US 258 in Franklin

U.S. Route 258 Business (US 258 Business) is a business route of US 258 through Franklin, Virginia. The highway runs 3.74 miles (6.02 km) from US 258 and US 58 south of Franklin to US 258 and US 58 Business east of Franklin. US 258 Business begins at a diamond interchange with the US 58 freeway in Southampton County; the highway immediately enters the city of Franklin as South Street. The business route passes to the south of the Franklin campus of Paul D. Camp Community College on its way to the downtown area. Just west of the Blackwater River, US 258 Business curves north onto Main Street, which crosses over CSX's Portsmouth Subdivision rail line. The business route turns east at Second Street and becomes concurrent with US 58 Business at Mechanic Street. The two business routes exit the city of Franklin by crossing the Blackwater River into Isle of Wight County. US 258 Business and US 58 Business continue east as Carrsville Highway through an industrial area. The business routes parallel the Portsmouth Subdivision and pass under Norfolk Southern Railway's Franklin District before reaching US 258 Business's northern terminus at US 258. US 58 Business continues east through Carrsville and Holland.

- Southampton County and City of Franklin (PDF)
- City of Suffolk (PDF)
- Isle of Wight County (PDF)
- City of Newport News (PDF)
- City of Hampton (PDF)

</ref>

=== Smithfield business route ===
U.S. Route 258 Business
- Location: Smithfield, VA
- Length: 3.07 mi (4.94 km)

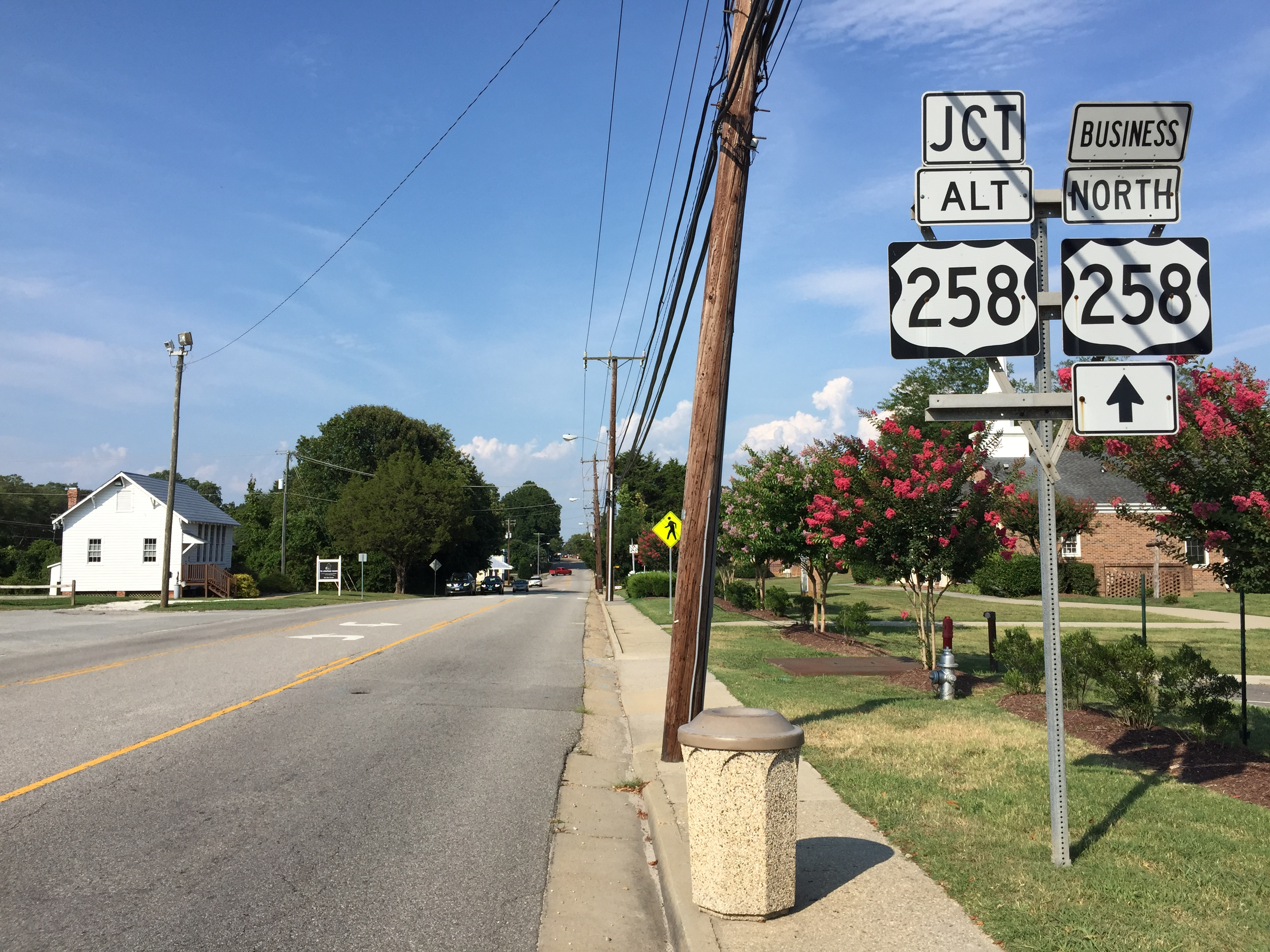
View north along US 258 Bus. at US 258 Alt. in Smithfield

U.S. Route 258 Business (US 258 Business) is a business route of US 258 through Smithfield, Virginia. The highway runs 3.07 miles (4.94 km) between intersections with US 258 and SR 10 on the west and south sides of Smithfield. US 258 Business begins at the junction of US 258 and SR 10; the two highways head south along the bypass of the town while the business route heads into the center of town as Main Street. The business route joins SR 10 Business on Church Street; the two highways parallel the Pagan River to its junction with Cypress Creek and provide access to Windsor Castle. After crossing Cypress Creek, US 258 Business and SR 10 Business curve south and expand to a five-lane road with center turn lane that the highways follow to their southern junction with US 258 and SR 10.

=== Smithfield alternate route ===
U.S. Route 258 Alternate
- Location: Smithfield, VA

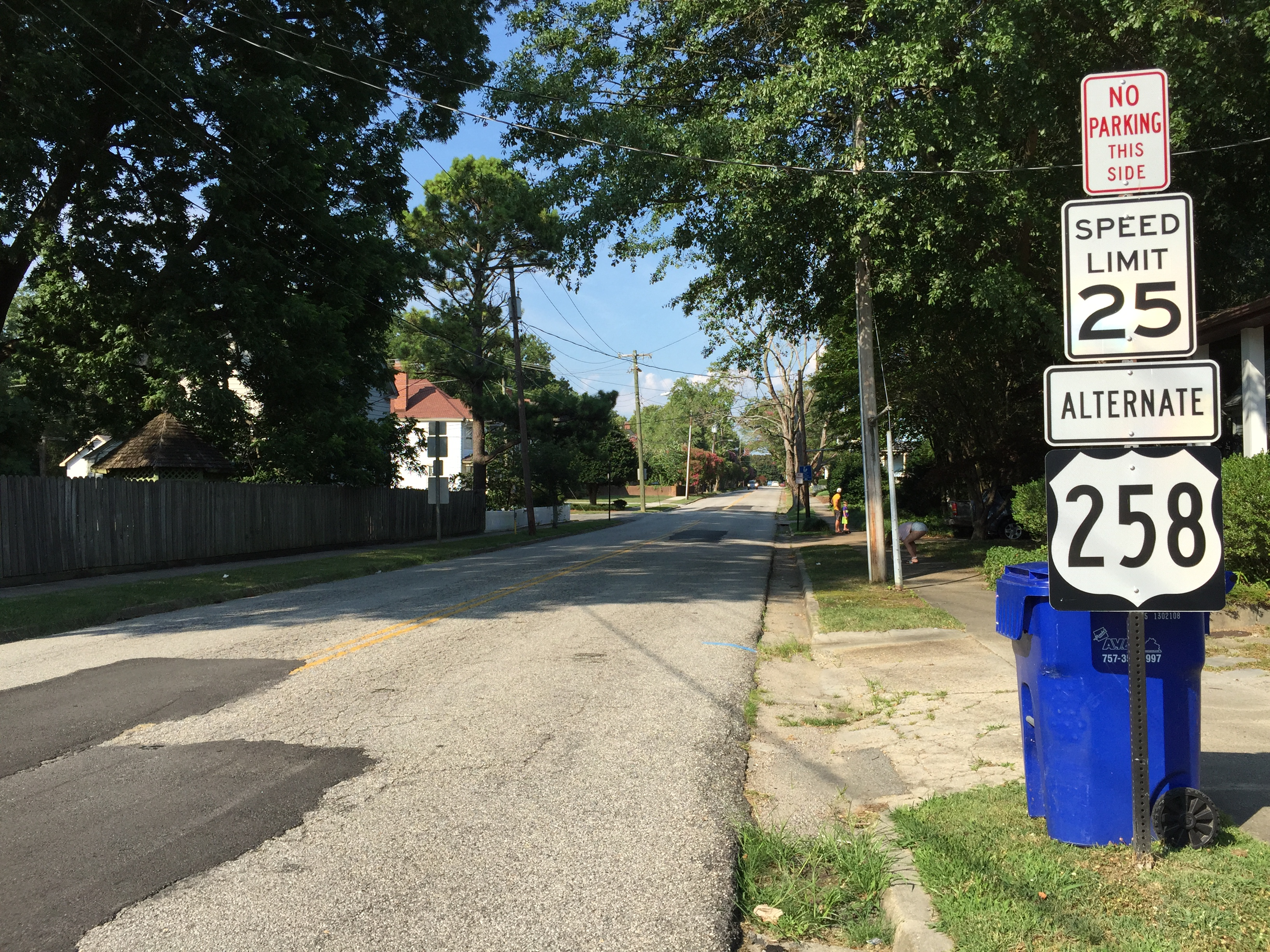
View north along US 258 Alt. in Smithfield

U.S. Route 258 Alternate (US 258 Alternate) is an alternate route of US 258 Business through Smithfield, Virginia. The highway starts at the southwest end of Grace Street at US 258 Bus on the west side of Smithfield, continues to Church Street, then turns right down Church Street before ending at US 258 Business in downtown Smithfield.

== See also ==
- List of special routes of the United States Numbered Highway System
