= City Point, Virginia =

City Point
- Former town
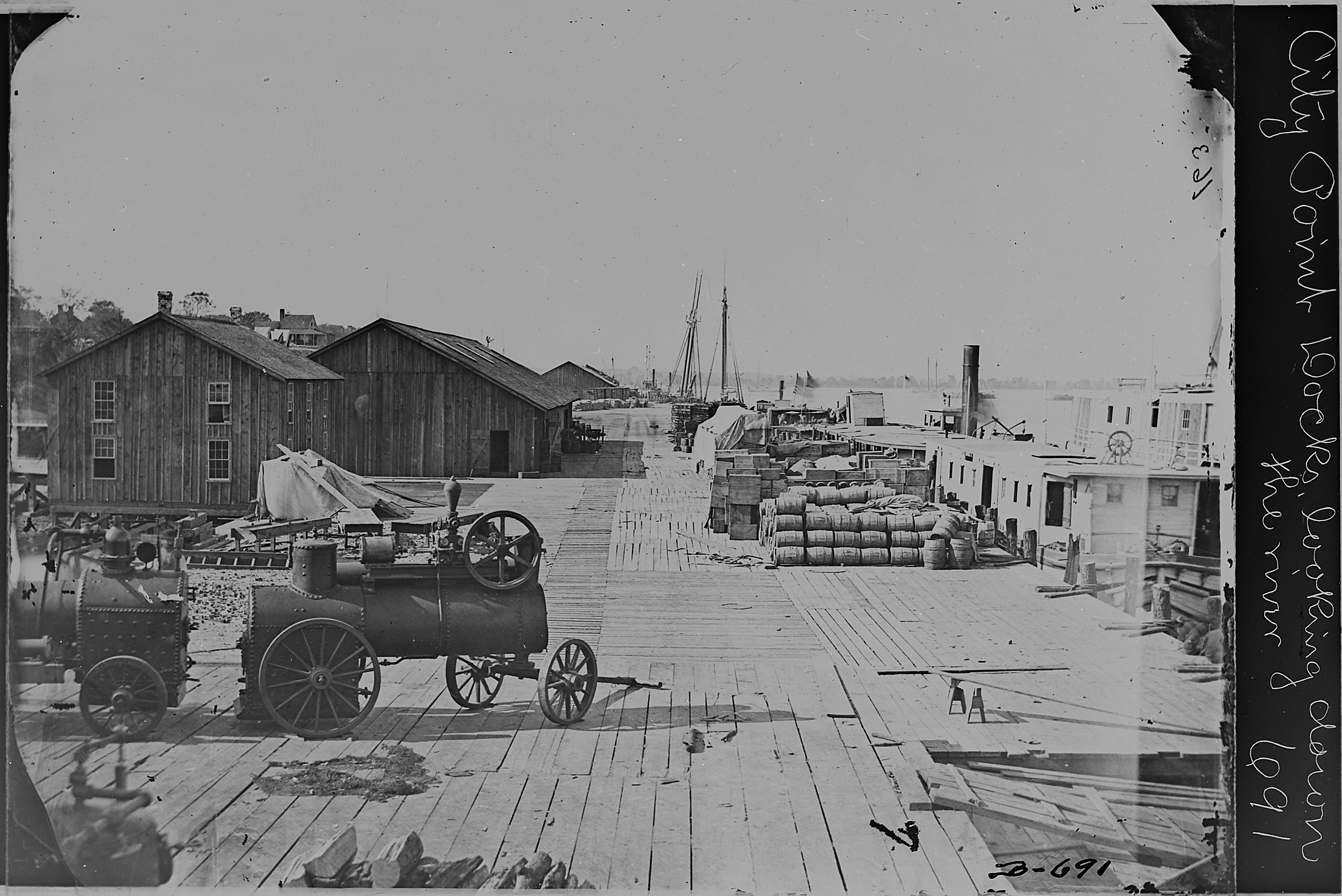

- Location within the state of Virginia
- Coordinates: 37°18′54″N 77°16′37″W
- Country: United States
- State: Virginia
- County: Prince George
- Time zone: UTC-5 (Eastern (EST))
  - Summer (DST): UTC-4 (EDT)

City Point was a town in Prince George County, Virginia, United States, that was annexed by the independent city of Hopewell in 1923. It served as headquarters of the Union Army during the siege of Petersburg during the American Civil War.

== History ==
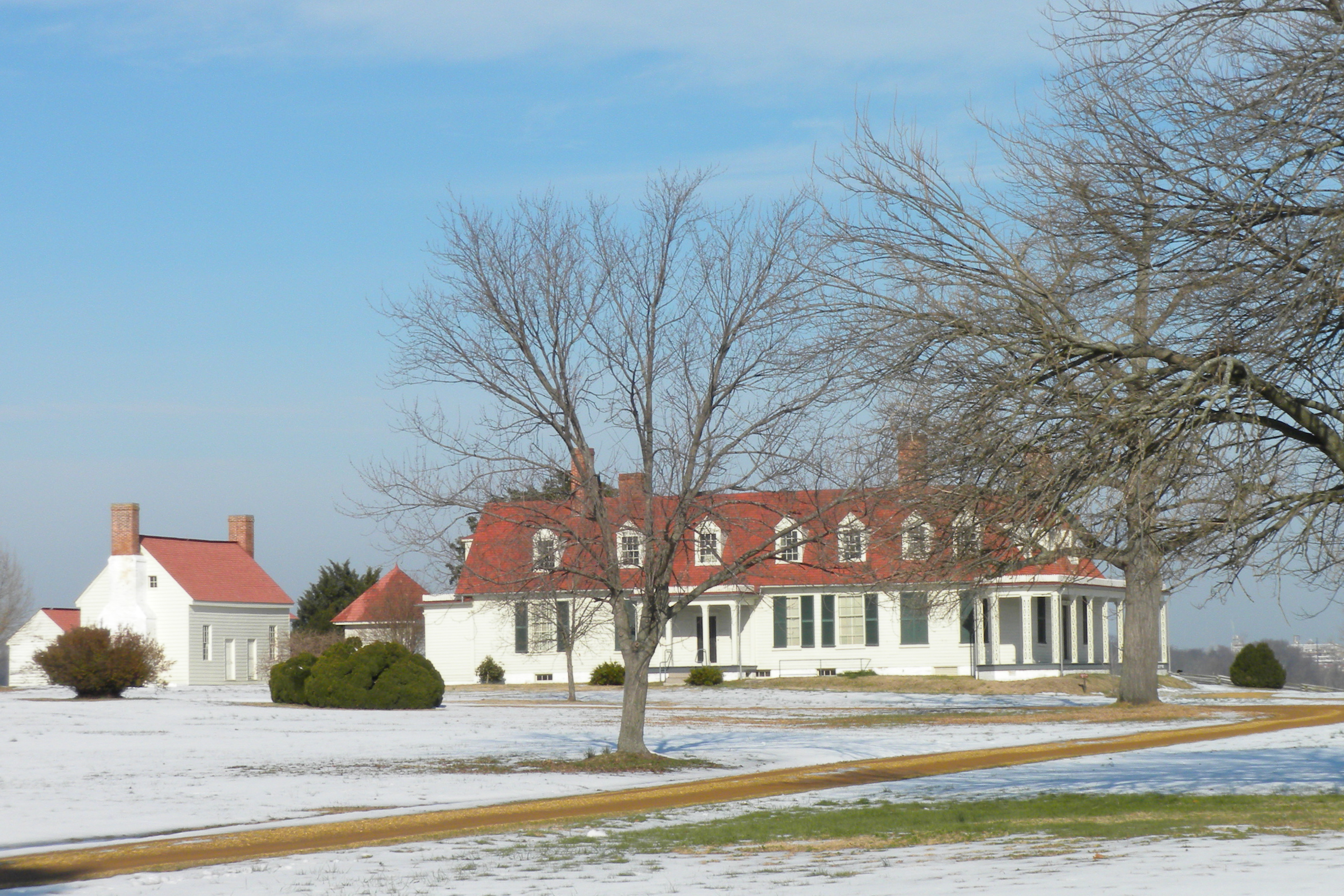
The Appomattox Manor

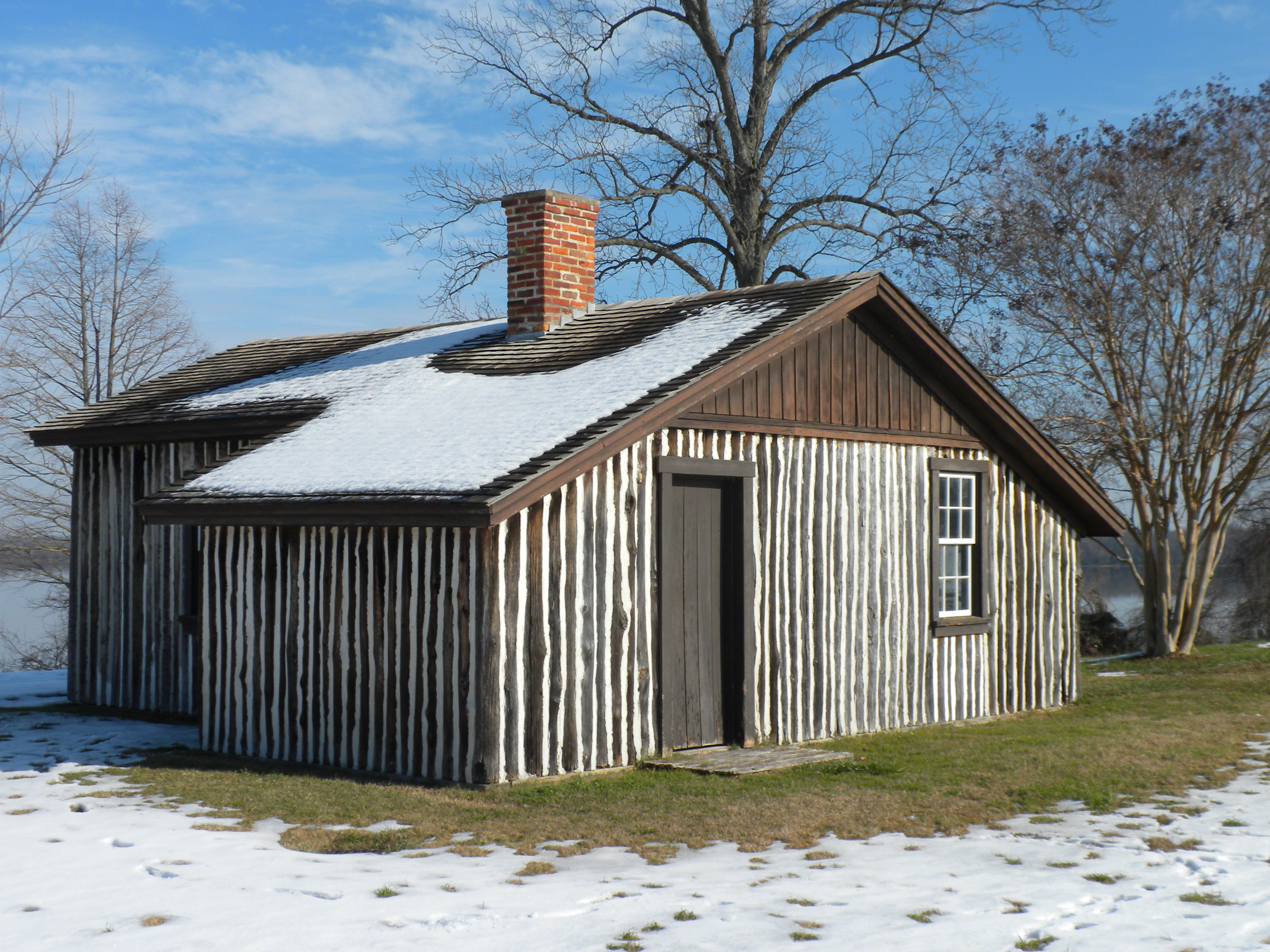
Cabin occupied by General U.S. Grant during the siege

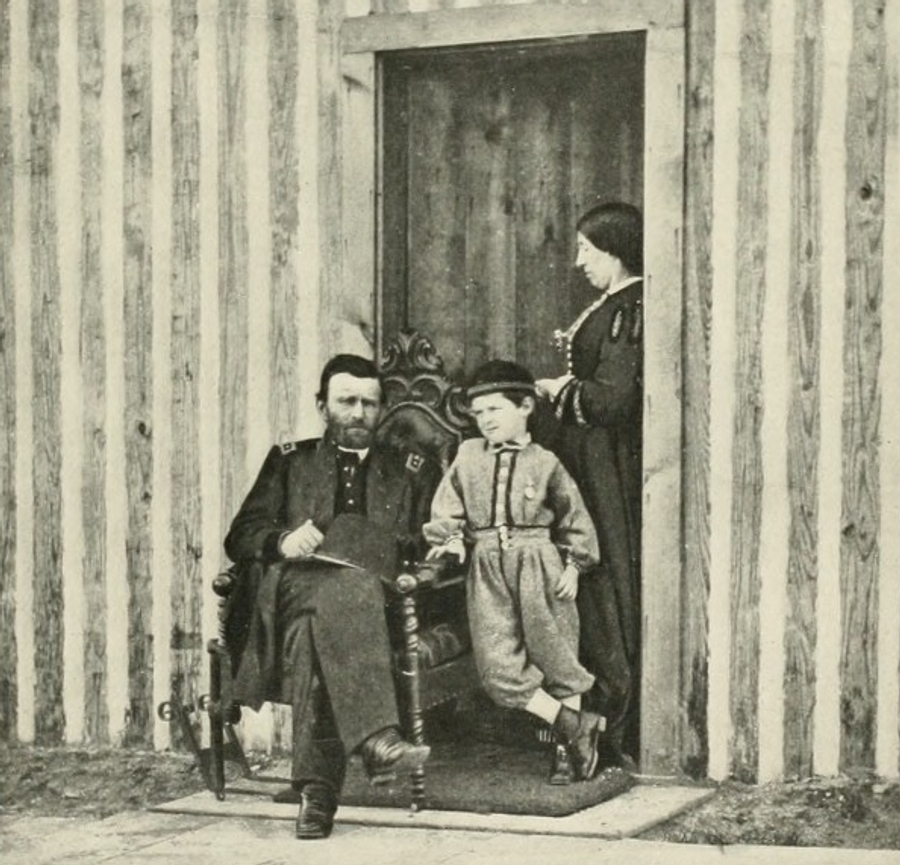
Grant at City Point in 1864 with his wife, Julia, and son Jesse

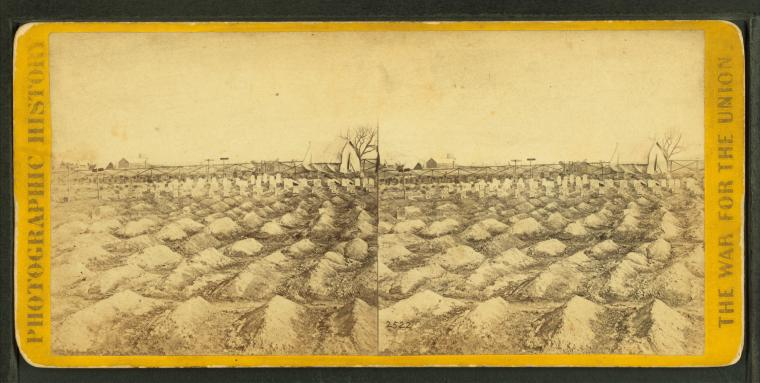
Soldiers' graves, near the General Hospital, City Point, Va

=== 1613–1863 ===
City Point owed its existence to its site overlooking the James and Appomattox Rivers. City Point was established in 1613 by Sir Thomas Dale. It was first known as Bermuda Cittie, but soon was renamed "Charles City" and was located in Charles City Shire when it was formed in 1634. Charles City Shire soon became known as Charles City County in 1643. City Point was included in the portion subdivided in 1703 to form Prince George County. In 1619 Samuel Sharpe and Samuel Jordan from City Point (then named Charles City) were burgesses at the first meeting of the House of Burgesses.

City Point was unaffected by the American Revolution until the final year of the war in January 1781. At that time the British fleet, commanded by Benedict Arnold, sailed up the James in an unsuccessful attempt to capture Governor Thomas Jefferson. The returning fleet was fired upon by cannons mounted near City Point. The British later landed in the spring, April 24, 1781, at City Point and moved toward the forces under French General Lafayette stationed at Petersburg, Virginia. Those forces at Petersburg repelled the British, and they retreated down the James River.

Lord Cornwallis regrouped the British at City Point for another attack on Lafayette's forces in Petersburg. Cornwallis spent one night in the plantation house, of the Bolling Family known as Mitchell's. The home no longer exists, it burned in 1925 and was demolished. The farm where it once stood overlooking the Appomattox was later developed as a residential neighborhood known as Mansion Hills, but a photo of Mitchell's taken during the Civil War survives.

Cornwallis' stay at Mitchell's gave rise to an interesting legend. During dinner, the British officers spoke freely of their plan to cross the James and attacking Lafayette from the rear of the bivouacked troops. Young Susanna Bolling listened carefully. In the dark of night she slipped through a secret passageway escaping unseen from her home. Canoeing across the Appomattox River, she then made her way on horseback to the Half-Way House, which still stands on Route 1 in Chesterfield County, where Lafayette was quartered. Forewarned, Lafayette escaped Cornwallis’ trap. The British grew tired of the chase and soon turned eastward and his forces became besieged in Yorktown by the Continental Army. Cornwallis surrendered at Yorktown in October 1781.

=== 1864 and after ===
During the American Civil War, City Point was the headquarters of General Ulysses S. Grant during the Siege of Petersburg in 1864 and 1865. To serve the Union army, two huge military installations were built—a supply depot and the Depot Field Hospital. During that siege, City Point was one of the busiest ports in the world.

On March 27 or 28, 1865, President Abraham Lincoln met at City Point with Generals Grant and William Tecumseh Sherman along with Admiral David Porter aboard the River Queen, as depicted by G.P.A Healy's 1868 painting The Peacemakers.

The City Point Railroad, built in 1838 between City Point and Petersburg, became part of the South Side Railroad in 1854, and played an important role in the Civil War. It later became the oldest portion of the Norfolk and Western Railway, itself now a part of Norfolk Southern.

Grant's Headquarters at Appomattox Manor form part of the National Park Service's Petersburg National Battlefield Park. The adjacent City Point Historical District is a registered National Historical Landmark.

See main article Hopewell, Virginia for more information.

==== Confederate sabotage ====
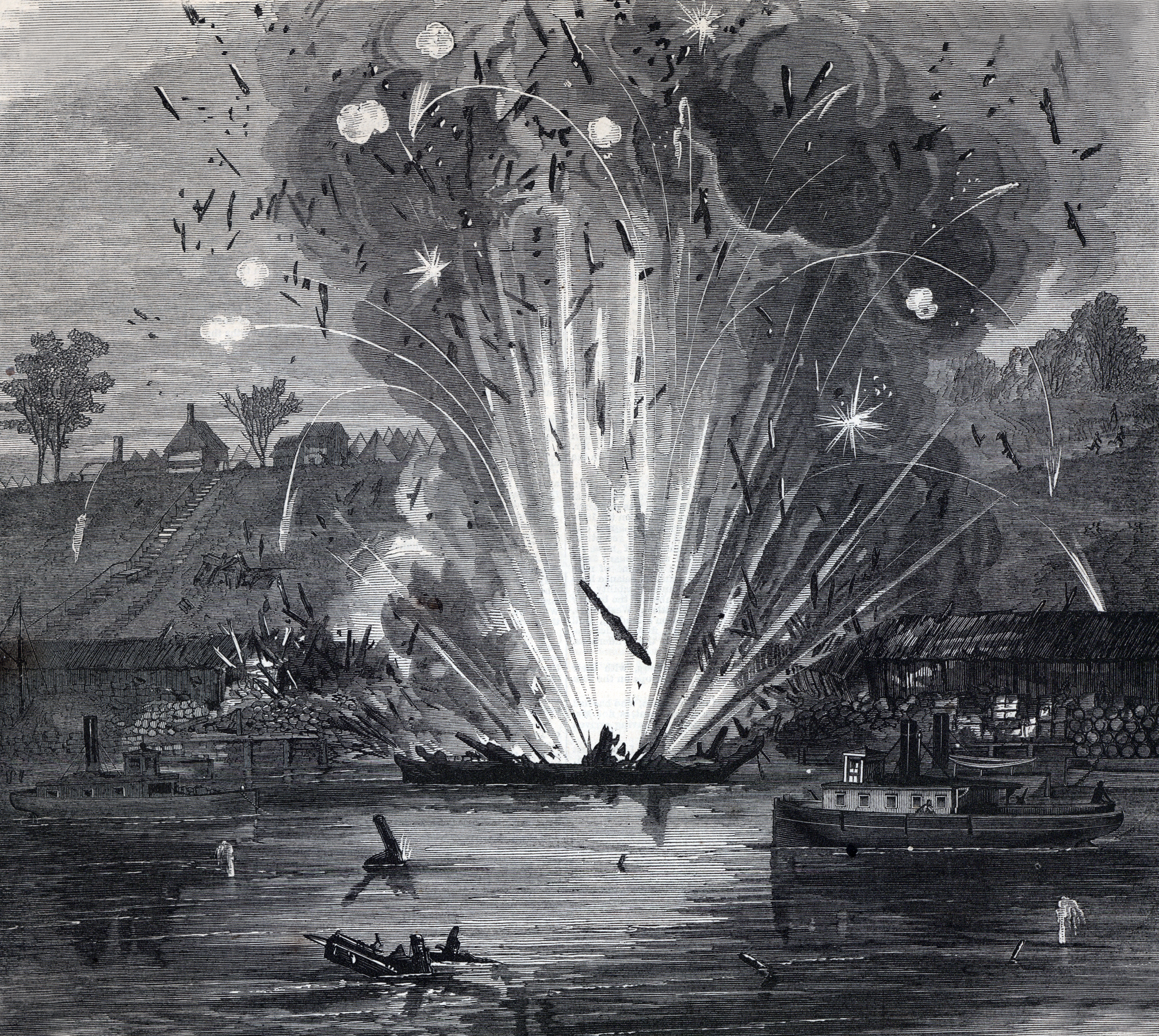
Explosion of the Powder Barges Hendricks and General Meade at City Point, VA, August 9

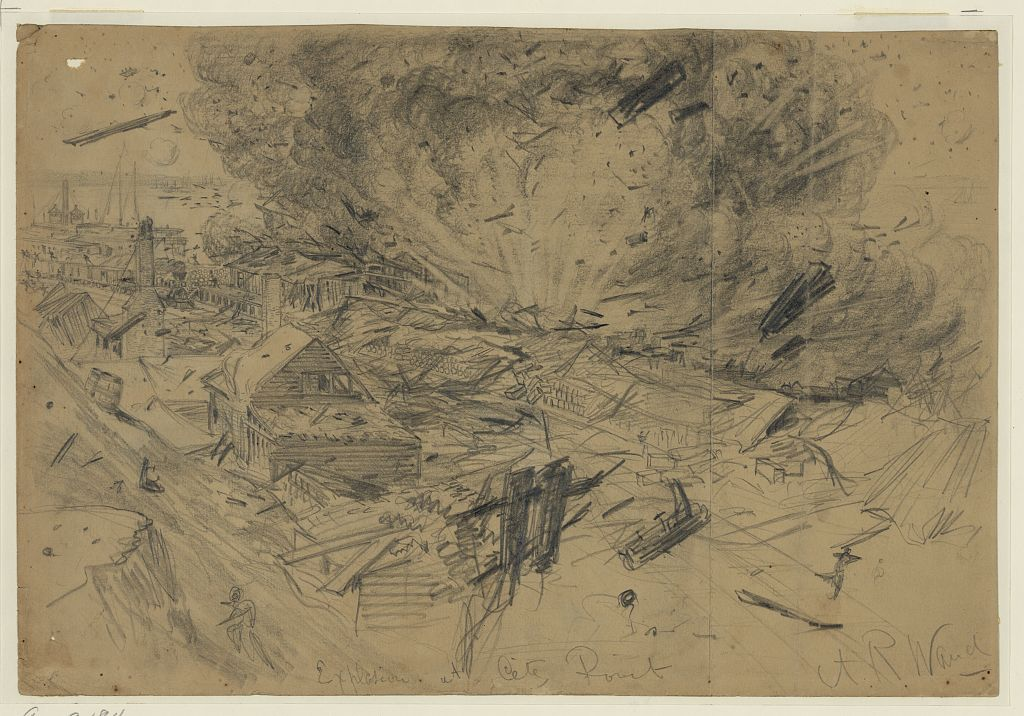
Alfred R. Waud's illustration of the explosion of the barge J. E. Kendrick at City Point on August 9, 1864, published in Harper's Weekly on August 27, 1864

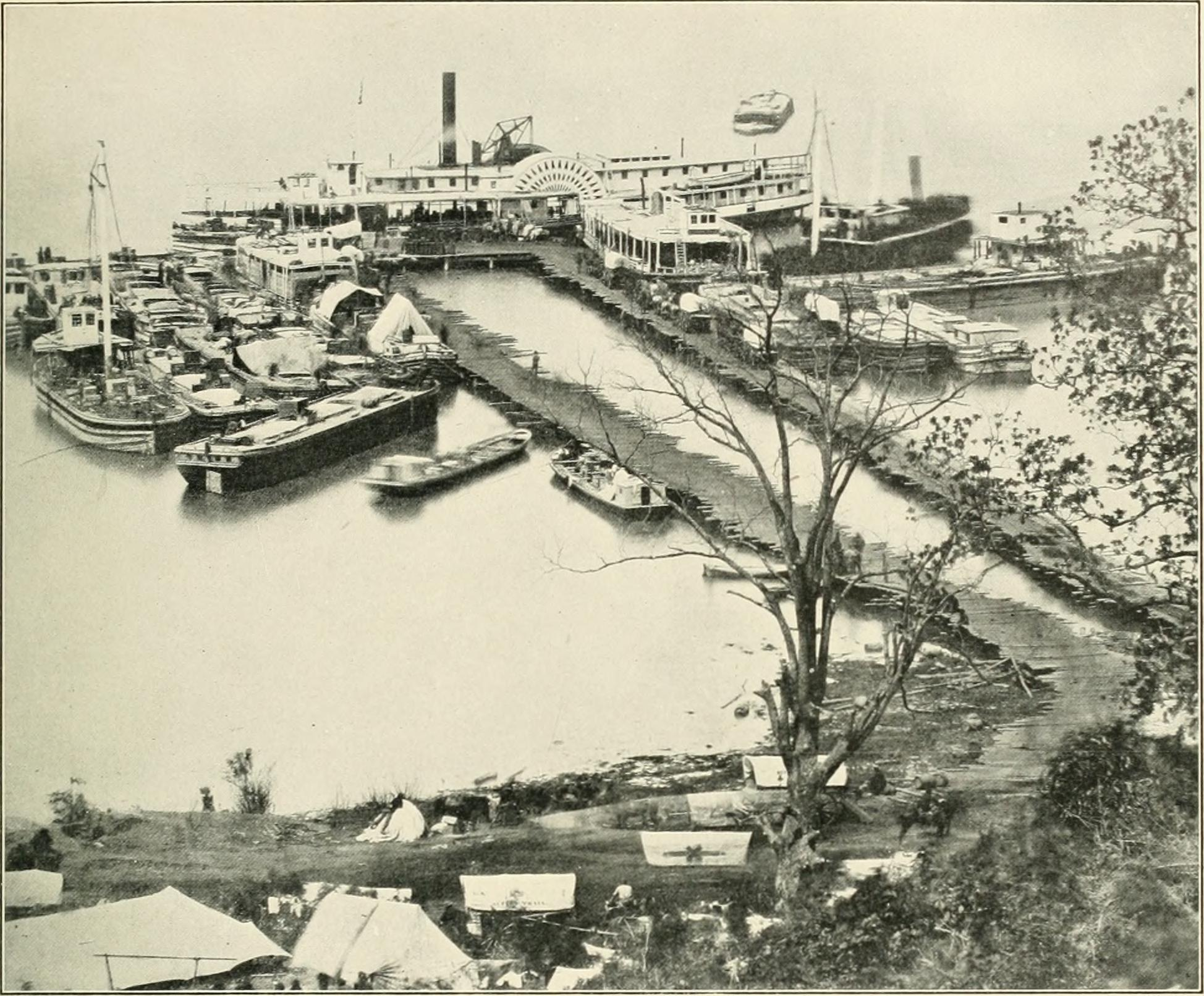
The magazine wharf at City Point during the Civil War

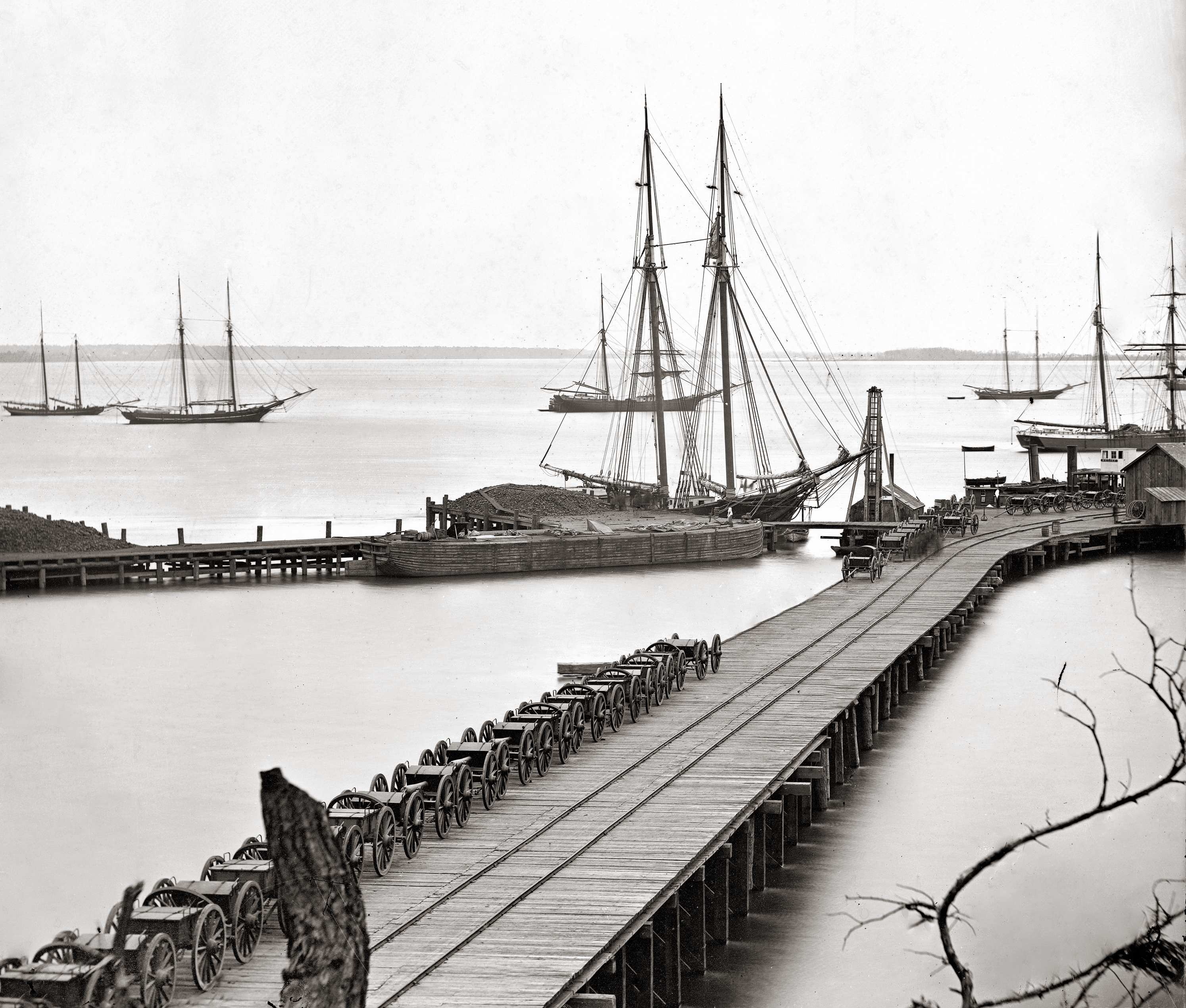
The waterfront of City Point, Virginia (present-day Hopewell) during the winter of 1864–1865

On August 9, 1864, a tremendous explosion shook the city. General Grant reported, "Every part of the yard used as my headquarters is filled with splinters and fragments of shell," and a staff officer wrote, "Such a rain of shot, shell, bullets, pieces of wood, iron bars and bolts, chains and missiles of every kind was never before witnessed."

Examination of the wreckage revealed that a barge loaded with ammunition had exploded, detonating 30,000 artillery shells and 75,000 rounds of small arms ammunition. 43 people were killed instantly and 126 were wounded (some accounts put the death toll at 300). As an illustration, Mrs. Elmira Spencer, New York State Agent attached to the 147th NY Reg, was out conducting her rounds on horseback when she was hit by the shrapnel and wounded her causing temporary paralysis in her legs and permanent sciatic nerve damage. Unknown numbers of contraband men who were not working at the time but near the dock were never accounted for and the Post Office and Adams Express Office were blown to bits leaving mail scattered in with the debris. The wharf was almost entirely destroyed, and the damage was put at $2 million.

After the war it was discovered that the massive explosion thought to be an accident had actually been an act of sabotage by the Confederates. Confederate Secret Service agent John Maxwell had smuggled a time bomb aboard the ammunition barge. Maxwell used a clockwork mechanism to ignite 12 pounds of gunpowder packed into a box marked "candles." He called it his "horological torpedo." (Horological referring to time keeping; torpedo was a term used in the Civil War a wide variety of bombs and booby traps.) Here is a portion of Maxwell's report, taken from the Official Records.

Sir:

I have the honor to report that in obedience to your order, and with the means and equipment furnished me by you, I left this city on the 26th of July last, for the line of the James River, to operate with the Horological Torpedo against the enemy’s vessels navigating that river. I had with me Mr. R. K. Dillard, who was well acquainted with the localities, and whose service I engaged for the expedition. On arriving in Isle of Wright County, on the 2nd of August, we learned of immense supplies of stores being landed at City Point, and for the purpose, by stratagem, of introducing our machine upon the vessels there discharging stores, started for that point. We reached there before daybreak on the 9th of August last, with a small amount of provisions, having traveled mostly by night and crawled upon our knees to pass the East picket line. Requesting my companion to remain behind about half a mile, I approached cautiously the wharf with my machine and powder covered by a small box.

Finding the captain had come ashore from a barge then at the wharf, I seized the occasion to hurry forward with my box. Being halted by one of the wharf sentinels, I succeeded in passing him by representing that captain had ordered me to convey the box on board. Hailing a man from the barge, I put the machine in motion and gave it in his charge. He carried it aboard. The magazine contained about twelve pounds of powder. Rejoining my companion, we retired to a safe distance to witness the effect of our effort. In about an hour the explosion occurred. Its effect was communicated to another barge beyond the one operated upon and also to a large wharf building containing their stores (enemy’s), which was totally destroyed. The scene was terrific, and the effect deafened my companion to an extent from which he has not recovered. My own person was severely shocked, but I am thankful to Providence that we have both escaped without lasting injury. We obtained and refer you to the enclosed slips from the enemy’s newspapers, which afford their testimony of the terrible effects of this blow. The enemy estimates the loss of life at 58 killed and 126 wounded, but we have reason to believe it greatly exceeded that. The pecuniary damage we heard estimated at $4,000,000 but, of course, we can give you no account of the extent of it exactly.

The explosion didn't much hinder the Union war effort. The City Point supply depot was back in full operation in nine days. Although sabotage was not yet affirmed, the ammunition supply wharf was rebuilt to a much higher degree of security.

== See also ==
- Bermuda Hundred, Virginia
- Charles City (Virginia Company)
- Charles City County, Virginia
- Prince George County, Virginia
- Hopewell, Virginia
- City Point National Cemetery
