= National Register of Historic Places listings in Prince George County, Virginia =

Location of Prince George County in Virginia

This is a list of the National Register of Historic Places listings in Prince George County, Virginia.

This is intended to be a complete list of the properties and districts on the National Register of Historic Places in Prince George County, Virginia, United States. The locations of National Register properties and districts for which the latitude and longitude coordinates are included below, may be seen in a Google map.

There are 10 properties and districts listed on the National Register in the county, including 1 National Historic Landmark.

This National Park Service list is complete through NPS recent listings posted March 6, 2026.

== Current listings ==
	Name on the Register	Image	Date listed	Location	City or town	Description
1	Aberdeen	Aberdeen	February 11, 2002 (#01001569)	15301 State Route 10; 37°13′37″N 77°08′17″W	Disputanta	
2	Brandon	Brandon	November 12, 1969 (#69000271)	West bank of the James River at the end of Brandon Rd. 37°15′27″N 76°59′36″W	Burrowsville	
3	Chester Plantation	Chester Plantation	November 3, 2007 (#03000208)	8401 Golf Course Dr. 37°08′20″N 77°15′18″W	Disputanta	
4	Church of the Sacred Heart Parish	Church of the Sacred Heart Parish	February 8, 2012 (#12000020)	9300 Community Ln. 37°11′15″N 77°19′28″W	Petersburg	
5	Evergreen	Evergreen	July 24, 1979 (#79003070)	East of Hopewell on Ruffin Rd. 37°17′27″N 77°14′26″W	Hopewell	
6	Flowerdew Hundred Plantation	Flowerdew Hundred Plantation	August 1, 1975 (#75002030)	Flowerdew Hundred Rd., east of Hopewell; 37°17′34″N 77°06′22″W	Garysville	
7	Hatch Archeological Site (44PG51)		November 6, 1989 (#89001923)	Address Restricted	Hopewell	
8	Martin's Brandon Church	Martin's Brandon Church	October 31, 1980 (#80004213)	State Route 10 and Morning Star Rd. 37°12′53″N 77°04′31″W	Burrowsville	
9	Merchant's Hope Church	Merchant's Hope Church	October 8, 1969 (#69000274)	West of the junction of State Route 10 and Merchants Hope Rd. 37°15′58″N 77°12′09″W	Hopewell	
10	Prince George County Courthouse Historic District	Prince George County Courthouse Historic District	June 23, 2003 (#03000570)	6400 Courthouse Rd. 37°13′15″N 77°17′16″W	Prince George	

== See also ==
- List of National Historic Landmarks in Virginia
- National Register of Historic Places listings in Virginia
- National Register of Historic Places listings in Hopewell, Virginia
