= Fitzhugh =

FitzHugh
- Language: Norman

Origin
- Meaning: "son of Hugh" (patronymic)
- Region of origin: England

Other names
- Variant forms: Hugh, Hughes, Howell, Fitchew, Fitchie, Fithie, Fithye, McCoy, Mac Aoidh

Fitzhugh is an English Anglo-Norman surname originating in Northamptonshire and Bedfordshire. It is patronymic as the prefix Fitz- derives from the Latin filius, meaning "son of". Its variants include FitzHugh, Fitz-Hugh, Fitz Hugh, fitz Hugh, and its associated given name turned surname Hugh. Fitzhugh is rare as a given name.

A family with the surname of Fitzhugh were proven descendants of Acaris, son of Bardolf, a son of Odo, Count of Penthièvre who was a close relative and important ally of William the Conqueror.

== Surname ==
People with the name Fitzhugh include:

- Alice FitzHugh (c. 1448–1516), English noblewoman
- Ann Carroll Fitzhugh (1805–1875), American abolitionist
- Bruce Fitzhugh, American musician
- Charles Lane Fitzhugh (1838–1923), American military officer
- Courtney Fitzhugh, American hematologist-oncologist and scientist
- Craig Fitzhugh (born 1950), American politician
- Elisabeth West FitzHugh (1926–2017), Lebanese American art conservation scientist
- Elizabeth FitzHugh (1455/65–1507), English noblewoman
- Ellen Fitzhugh, (1942–2023), American musical theater lyricist
- Eugene Fitzhugh (1926–2007), American lawyer and businessman
- Everett Fitzhugh (born 1989), American sportscaster
- Francis C. FitzHugh (1928–1984), American Anglo-Catholic priest
- George Fitzhugh (priest) (died 1505), chancellor of Cambridge University and Dean of Lincoln
- George Fitzhugh (1806–1881), American, pro-slavery social theorist
- Gilbert W. Fitzhugh (1911–1997), American actuary and businessman
- H. Naylor Fitzhugh (1909–1992), American academic
- Henry FitzHugh, 3rd Baron FitzHugh (c. 1358–1425)
- Henry Fitzhugh (sheriff) (1686–1758), American planter
- Henry Fitzhugh (burgess) (1706–1742), American planter and soldier
- Henry Fitzhugh (assemblyman) (1801–1866), New York politician
- John FitzHugh (c. 1180–1220), English royal counsellor
- Keith Fitzhugh (born 1986), American football player
- Kirk J. Fitzhugh (born 1957), American museum curator
- Kristine Fitzhugh (1947–2000) American murder victim
- Lorraine Fitzhugh (born 1963), American soccer player
- Louise Fitzhugh (1928–1974), American author
- Nicholas Battalle Fitzhugh (1764–1814), American politician and judge
- Percy Keese Fitzhugh (1876–1950), American author
- Robert FitzHugh (died 1436), Bishop of London
- Samuel Fitzhugh, African-American politician
- Steve Fitzhugh (born 1963), American football player
- Terrick V. H. FitzHugh (1907–1990), English film producer and genealogist
- Thornton Fitzhugh (1864–1933), American architect
- Valerie A. Fitzhugh, American pathologist
- William FitzHugh, 4th Baron FitzHugh (c. 1399–1452)
- William Fitzhugh (1741–1809), American politician and planter
- William F. Fitzhugh (1818–1883), American Confederate soldier and Texas Ranger
- William H. Fitzhugh (1792–1830), son of the above and also an American politician
- William W. Fitzhugh (born 1943), American archaeologist and anthropologist

== Given name ==
- Fitzhugh Andrews (1873–1961), American teacher and composer
- Fitzhugh Dodson (1923–1993), American clinical psychologist, lecturer, educator and author
- Fitzhugh L. Fulton (1925–2015), American pilot
- Fitzhugh Green Sr. (1888–1947), American arctic explorer
- Fitzhugh Green Jr. (1917–1990), American businessman
- Fitz Houston (born 1953), American actor, musician, author and pastor
- Fitzhugh Lee (1835–1905), American military officer, politician, and diplomat
- Fitzhugh Lee III (1905–1992), American admiral, grandson of Fitzhugh Lee
- Fitz Hugh Ludlow (1836–1870), American author, journalist, and explorer
- Fitzhugh Mullan (1942–2019), American physician, writer, educator, and social activist
- Fitzhugh Townsend (1872–1906), American fencer
