= Cedar Ridge =

Cedar Ridge may refer to the following places in the United States:

- Cedar Ridge, Nevada County, California
- Cedar Ridge, Tuolumne County, California
- Cedar Ridge (Disputanta, Virginia), a historic home
- Cedar Ridge High School (North Carolina), in Hillsborough
- Cedar Ridge High School (Texas), in Round Rock

== See also ==
- Cedar Crest (disambiguation)
