= Fitzhugh (disambiguation) =

Fitzhugh is a given name and surname.

Fitzhugh may also refer to:

- Fitzhugh, Oklahoma, US, a town
- Fitzhugh, Virginia, US, an unincorporated community
- Jasper, Alberta, Canada, originally a railway siding called Fitzhugh
  - The Fitzhugh, a weekly newspaper serving the Jasper, Alberta, area
- Baron FitzHugh, a peerage of England
- Gerald Fitzhugh, a fictional character in the Left Behind novels The Regime and The Rapture

== See also ==
- Fitz-Hugh–Curtis syndrome
