= Gentleman farmer =

Landowner and hobby farmer

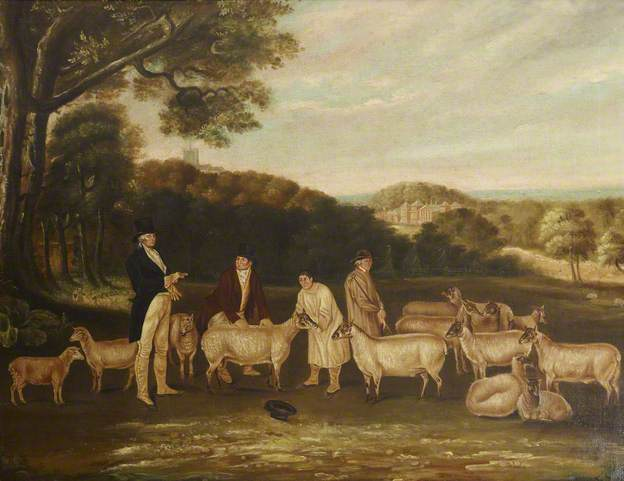
Gentleman farmers like Coke of Norfolk (at left) were not dependent on revenue generated by their agricultural pursuits, but involved themselves in their running.

In the United Kingdom, the United States, and Canada, a gentleman farmer is a landowner who owns a farm (a gentleman's farm) as part of his estate and who farms as a hobby rather than for profit or sustenance.

The Collins English Dictionary defines a gentleman farmer in the United Kingdom as one who is actively involved in farming but does not do it for a living, or a person who happens to own a farm but does not farm it himself (paraphrase). A gentleman farmer of the United States is defined as a rich man who can afford to farm for pleasure, or a rich man who farms not to earn, but because he is interested in it (paraphrase).

The farm can vary from under ten to hundreds or even thousands of acres, and may produce any number of types of grains, poultry, or other livestock. A gentleman farmer employs labourers and may also employ a farm manager, and the farm is usually not the chief source of his income. He generally has his own private income, works in a profession, owns a large business elsewhere, or some combination of the three.

Some notable British gentlemen farmers include the following: King George III; Thomas Shaw-Hellier, director of the British Army's Royal Military School of Music and a breeder of Jersey cattle; William Strickland, 6th Baron Boynton, of Yorkshire, numismatist and author of the Journal of a Tour of the United States of America, 1794–95; the pirate Edward Collier, second-in-command to Sir Henry Morgan during his expeditions in Spain; the Kent County Cricket Club cricketer Hopper Levett; and television presenter Jeremy Clarkson.

American examples include James Roosevelt I, the father of President Franklin D. Roosevelt; Dwight D. Eisenhower, who retired to a farm near Gettysburg, Pennsylvania, after leaving the White House; Winthrop Rockefeller, son of John D. Rockefeller Jr., who moved to Arkansas in 1953 and established Winrock Farms on Petit Jean Mountain; James Jefferson Webster, who owned multiple business and served in the Rockingham County local government; Frederick Hinde Zimmerman; Frank C. Rathje; William Locke Allison, known for Allison Woods, which was added to the National Register of Historic Places in 1995; and Robert Williams Daniel, a bank executive who survived the sinking of the Titanic and later married Margery Durant, daughter of General Motors founder Billy Durant, and was elected to the Virginia Senate in 1935. His farm, Brandon, one of the oldest continuous agricultural operations in the United States, was listed on the National Register of Historic Places in 1969, and was further declared a U.S. National Historic Landmark in 1985.

== See also ==
- Agroecological restoration
- Back-to-the-land movement
- Family farm
- Hobby farm
- Local food
- Romanticism
- Gentry
- American gentry
- Old South
