= Disputanta =

Disputanta may refer to:

- Disputanta, Kentucky, an unincorporated community located in Rockcastle County
- Disputanta, Virginia, an unincorporated community in Prince George County
