= Brandon Plantation =

Brandon Plantation may refer to:

- Lower Brandon Plantation (Prince George County, Virginia), historically known as Brandon Plantation
- Upper Brandon Plantation (Prince George County, Virginia), created from Lower Brandon
- Brandon Plantation (Halifax County, Virginia)
