= Fitzhugh Green =

Fitzhugh Green may refer to:

- Fitzhugh Green, Sr., (1888–1947), author and arctic explorer
- Fitzhugh Green, Jr., (1917–1990), an executive with Vicks Chemical Company and then with Life magazine
