= Appomattox Regional Library =

Appomattox Regional Library system serves the city of Hopewell and Prince George and Dinwiddie counties in Virginia. The library system is within Region 2 of Virginia Library Association (VLA).

== Service area ==
According to the FY 2014 Institute of Museum and Library Services Data Catalog, the Appomattox Regional Library System has a service area population of 86,625 with one central library and seven branch libraries.

== History ==
The Appomattox Regional Library system started in 1930. Thomas B. Robertson created a library association. Hopewell city took over the library and hired Maude Langhorne Nelson to be the library's first librarian. The library was then called John Randolph library, now the United Virginia Bank. The library was then moved in 1957 to the Municipal Building, the name changed to Maude Langhorne Nelson Library.

In 1974, the library became Appomattox Regional Library system when Prince George and Dinwiddie counties joined the city of Hopewell to form the regional library system. The library was named after the Appomattox River that runs through all of the areas within the libraries' boundaries.

== Branches ==
- Burrowsville Library (Disputanta)
- Carson Depot Library (Carson)
- Dinwiddie Library (Dinwiddie)
- Disputanta Library (Disputanta)
- Maude Langhorne Nelson Library (Hopewell)
- McKenney Library (McKenney)
- Prince George Library (Prince George)
- Rohoic (Petersburg)
