= Burrowsville, Virginia =

Unincorporated community in Virginia, US

Coordinates: 37°12′53″N 77°04′33″W

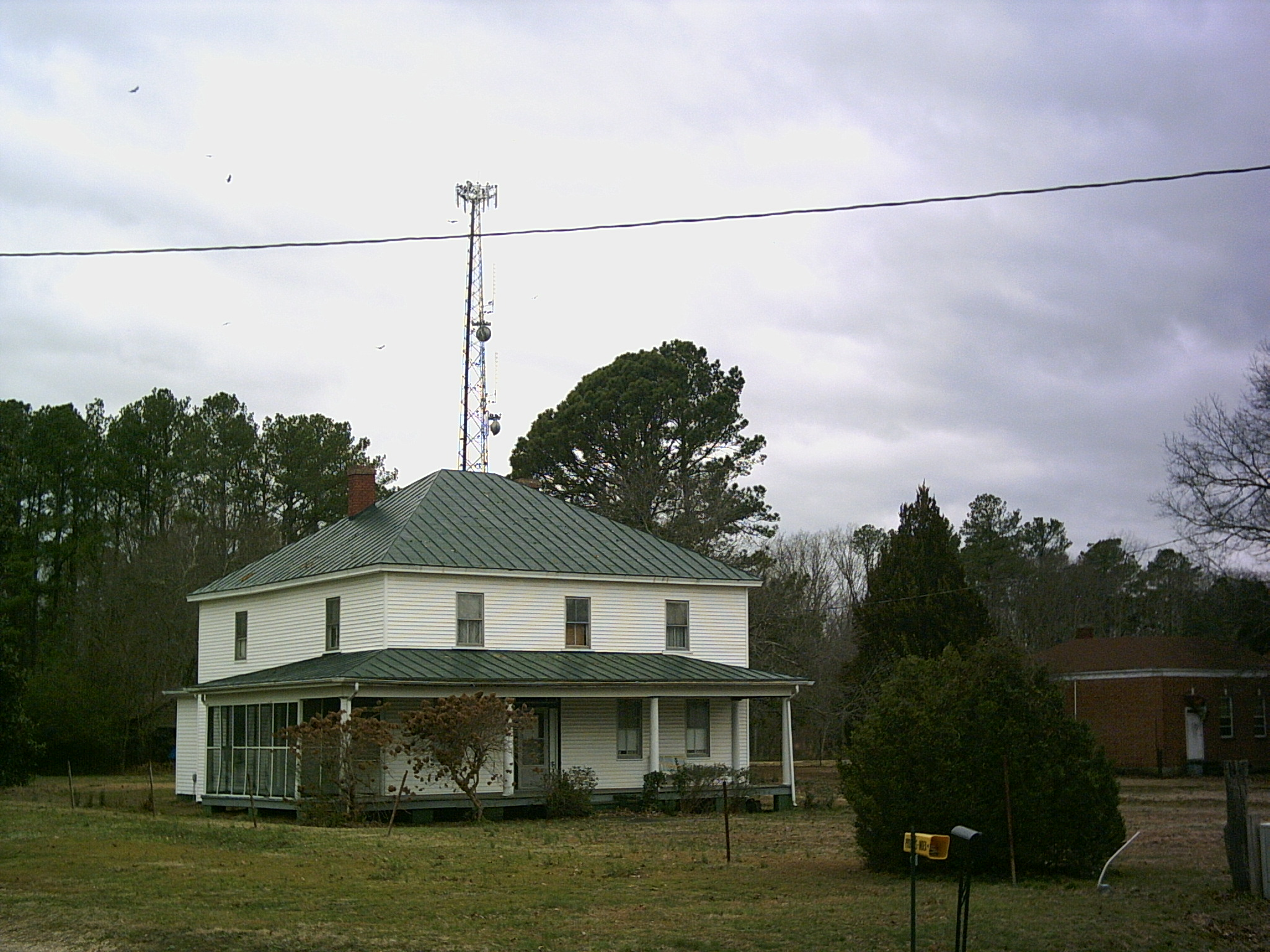
House in central Burrowsville, across from Martin's Brandon Church

Burrowsville is an unincorporated community in Prince George County, Virginia, United States. It is located on James River Drive. The community takes its name from the Burrow family, who settled in the area during colonial period and many of whose descendants still live in Burrowsville.

Burrowsville is the location of Brandon Plantation, and Upper Brandon Plantation, both U.S. National Historic Landmarks, as well as the historic Willow Hill Plantation, and Martin's Brandon Church, listed on the National Register of Historic Places.

Another historic building is the Salem Methodist Church, located near Burrowsville off Virginia State Route 10. Many well-known people are buried there.
