= Cedar Crest =

Cedar Crest may refer to:

- Cedar Crest, California
- Cedar Crest, Massachusetts
- Cedar Crest, New Mexico
- Cedar Crest, Oklahoma
- Cedar Crest, Pennsylvania
- Cedar Crest (Faunsdale, Alabama), plantation on the National Register of Historic Places
- Cedar Crest (Gladwyne, Pennsylvania), an estate
- Cedar Crest (mansion), Kansas Governor mansion

== See also ==
- Cedar Crest Boulevard near Allentown, Pennsylvania
- Cedar Crest College near Allentown, Pennsylvania
