= Magnolia Grange =

Historic house in Virginia, United States

- U.S. National Register of Historic Places
- Virginia Landmarks Register
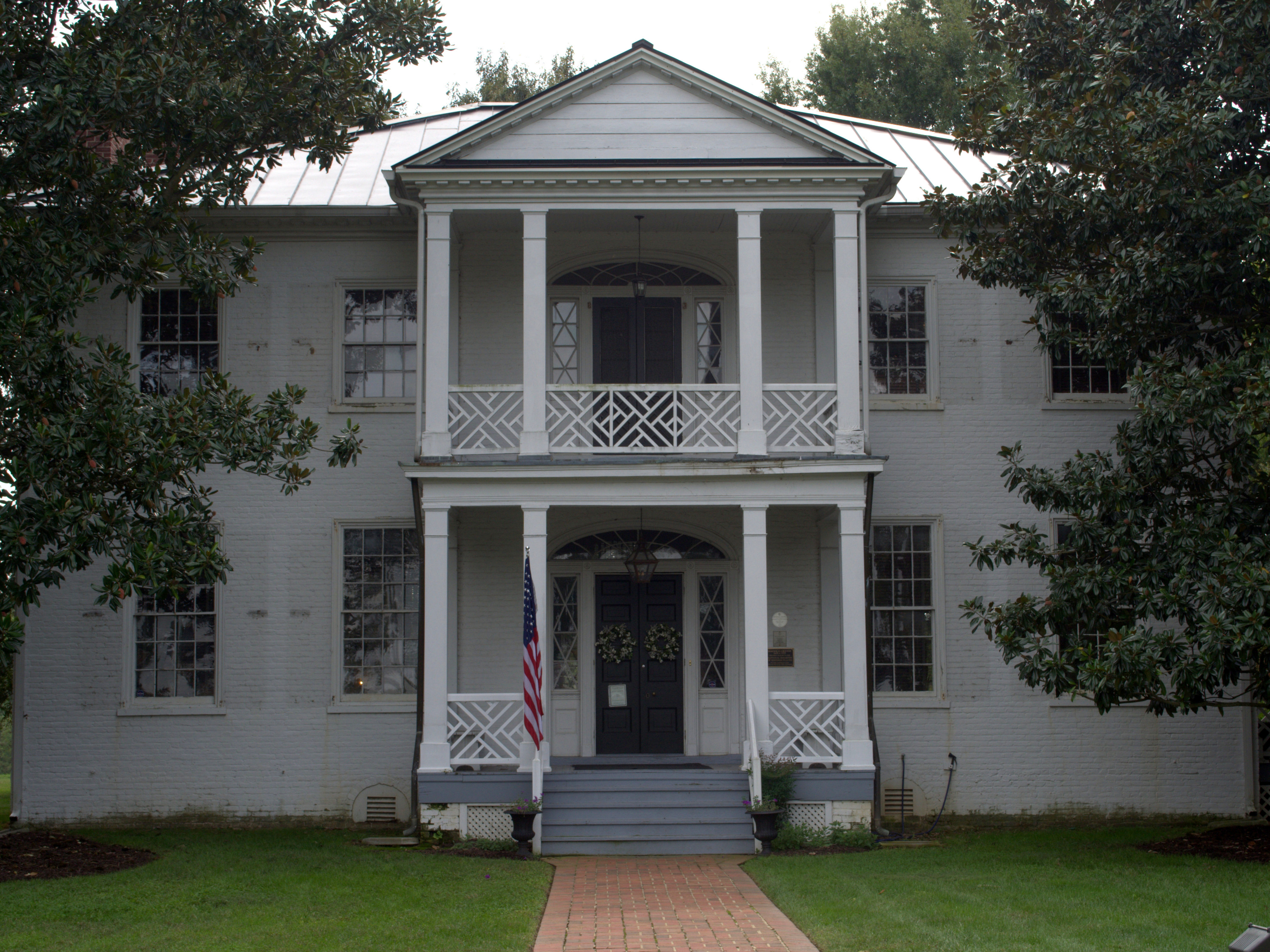
- Magnolia Grange

- Location within Virginia Location within the United States
- Location: VA 10, Chesterfield, Virginia
- Coordinates: 37°22′30″N 77°30′27″W
- Area: 4 acres (1.6 ha)
- Built: 1823
- Architectural style: Federal
- NRHP reference No.: 80004179
- VLR No.: 020-0074

Significant dates
- Added to NRHP: March 17, 1980
- Designated VLR: November 20, 1979

The Magnolia Grange is a historic mansion located across from the Chesterfield County Courthouse in Chesterfield, Chesterfield County, Virginia. This brick plantation house was built in 1823, and is a two-story, five-bay, brick dwelling in the Federal style. It is known for its elaborate woodwork and ornamental ceiling medallions.

The house was restored in the 1970s with Zuber scenic wallpaper of a hunting landscape that was installed in the front hallway. Magnolia Grange was listed on the National Register of Historic Places in 1980.

The plantation house is operated as a historic house museum by the Chesterfield Historical Society.
