= Margery Durant =

American writer (1887–1969)

- Born: Margery Pitt Durant; May 24, 1887; Flint, Michigan, U.S.
- Died: February 3, 1969 (aged 81); Florida, U.S.
- Known for: Author, Aviation Enthusiast, Photographer, and Socialite
- Spouses: Edwin; Rutheven Campbell (divorced) Robert Williams Daniel (divorced) John Hampton Cooper (divorced): Fitzhugh Green Sr.
- Children: 3, including William Durant Campbell
- Parent(s): William Crapo Durant and Clara Miller (nee Pitt) Durant

Margery Pitt Durant (May 24, 1887 – February 3, 1969) was the daughter of businessman and General Motors founder, Billy Durant. She was notable for authoring a book about her father, her contributions to increasing travel abroad via aviation, photographing her aviation adventures, and for being a socialite.

== Early life ==
Margery Pitt Durant was born on May 24, 1887, in the city of Flint, Michigan. She was the daughter of William Crapo Durant and Clara Miller Pitt Durant. Growing up, Durant attended schools in Michigan, New York, and Washington D.C.

== My Father ==
In 1929, Durant published My Father, the book about her father William Crapo Durant. He was still alive at age 65 when the book was released. In the opening of the book, she wrote of her first "horseless carriage" ride. Upon her return, her father, the future founder of General Motors said, "Margery, how could you - how could you be so foolish to risk your life in one of those things." Margery wrote about her father with anecdotes from him, but a lot was written through her viewpoint.

== Aviation ==
In the early thirties, Durant advocated for private aviation. Amelia Earhart gave her the name of a reputable pilot who assisted her in learning to fly. She later bought her own airplane, a Lockheed Vega. In 1931 Durant had her aircraft transported across the Atlantic aboard the ocean liner S.S. Hamburg so she could fly over different countries in Europe and Africa. While there, she took a number of photographs of her travels which are occasionally displayed today.

== Personal life ==
Durant married a doctor and associate of her father, Edwin Rutheven Campbell (1868–1929), on April 18, 1906, at St. Paul's Episcopal Church in Flint, Michigan. She had William Durant Campbell in 1907 and Margery Edwina Campbell (later Mrs. Grant Sanger) in 1909 with him. They divorced in 1919. She then married a banker, Robert Williams Daniel, a Titanic survivor and business associate of her father. Their marriage was shorter than her first, but she had her last child, Margery Randolph Daniel, with him in 1924. In 1926 the couple bought Brandon Plantation in Prince George County, Virginia, and restored its historic mansion but they soon divorced. In 1929, she was married to John Hampton Cooper. However, in My Father, she acknowledges Fitzhugh Green, an explorer and Naval Commander, for "making the book possible." She married him in 1933.

The year of 1947 created quite some turmoil for Durant. Her father died that year. In September, she and Fitzhugh Green were charged for opiate possession. A few months later, Fitzhugh died leaving Margery a widow.

Durant died on February 3, 1969, in Florida.
