= Courtney Fitzhugh =

American doctor

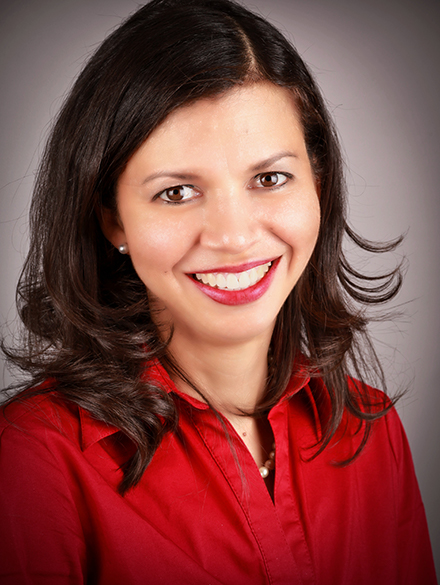
- Born: Los Angeles, California, U.S.
- Education: University of California, Los Angeles, (BS); University of California, San Francisco, (MD)
- Scientific career
- Fields: Hematology
- Workplaces: National Institutes of Health

Courtney D. Fitzhugh is an American hematologist-oncologist and scientist. She is a clinical researcher and head of the laboratory of early sickle cell mortality prevention at the National Heart, Lung, and Blood Institute.

== Life ==
Fitzhugh was born in Los Angeles, California. completed a B.S. magna cum laude from the University of California, Los Angeles in 1996. She earned a M.D. from the University of California, San Francisco in 2001. During medical school, Fitzhugh participated in the National Institutes of Health (NIH) Clinical Research Training Program, where she studied with John F. Tisdale at the National Heart, Lung, and Blood Institute (NHLBI). After completing her M.D., Fitzhugh completed a joint residency in internal medicine and pediatrics at Duke University Medical Center, and in 2005 she did a combined adult hematology and pediatric hematology-oncology fellowship at the NIH and Johns Hopkins Hospital.

Fitzhugh returned to the NHLBI in 2007 and was appointed as assistant clinical investigator in 2012 and clinical tenure track investigator in 2016. She is a Lasker clinical research scholar and heads the NHLBI laboratory of early sickle mortality prevention. Her laboratory researches sickle cell disease and hematopoietic stem cell transplantation.

Fitzhugh is a member of the American Society of Hematology.
