= Martin's Brandon Church =

Historic church in Virginia, United States

- U.S. National Register of Historic Places
- Virginia Landmarks Register
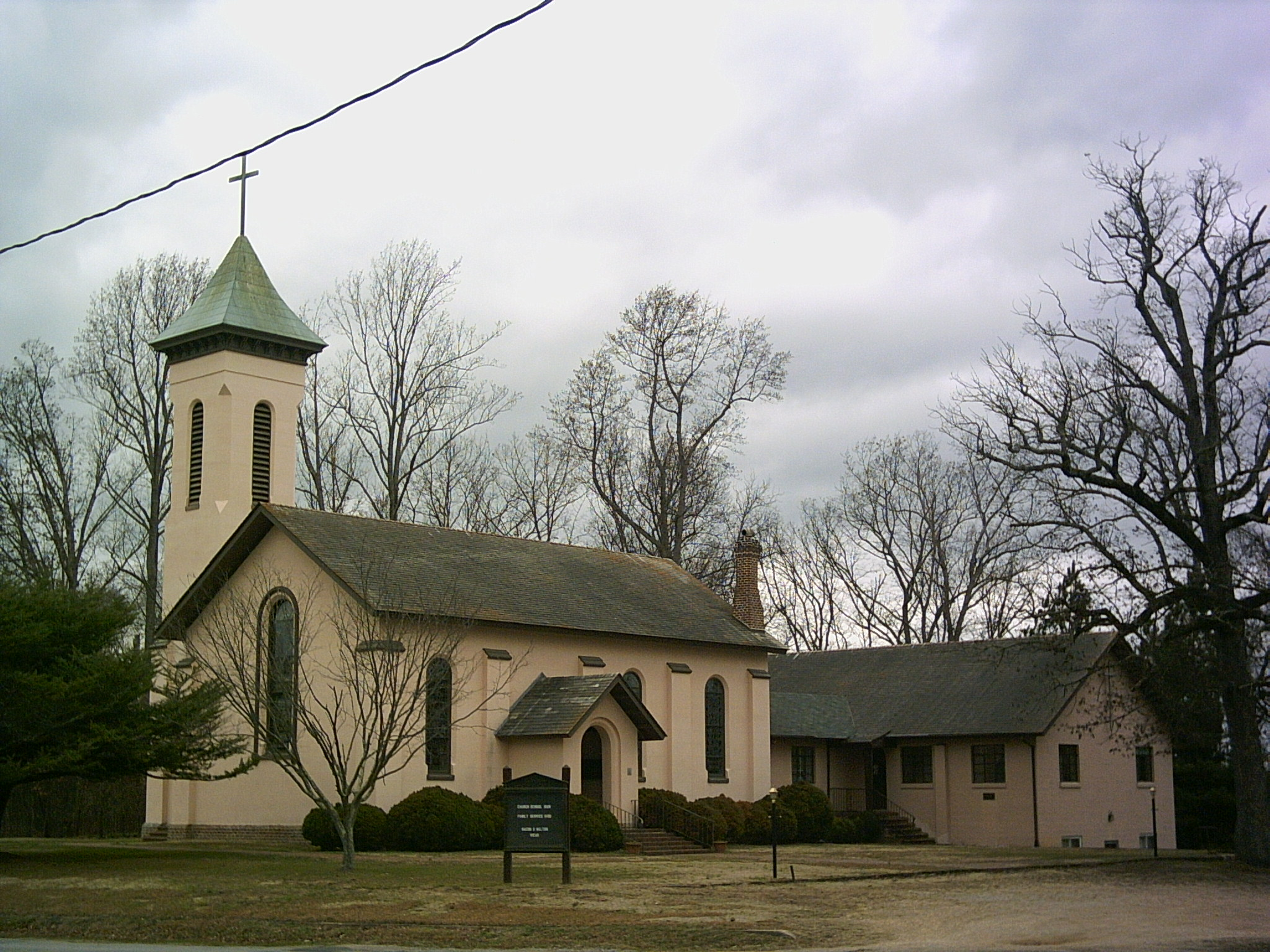
- Martin's Brandon Church, December 2008

- Location within Virginia Location within the United States
- Location: VA 10 and VA 1201, Burrowsville, Virginia
- Coordinates: 37°12′53″N 77°4′31″W
- Area: 3 acres (1.2 ha)
- Built: 1855
- Architect: Niernsee & Neilson
- Architectural style: Renaissance, Tuscan
- NRHP reference No.: 80004213
- VLR No.: 074-0003

Significant dates
- Added to NRHP: October 31, 1980
- Designated VLR: July 31, 1980

Martin's Brandon Church, also known as Brandon Church and as Martin's Brandon Episcopal Church, is a historic Episcopal church located at 18706 James River Drive in Burrowsville, Virginia. Martin's Brandon Parish was formed in the early 17th century and derives its name from the nearby Martin's Brandon Plantation patented by Captain John Martin in 1616. The current church was designed by noted Baltimore architect Niernsee & Neilson and built in 1855 as a replacement for an earlier sanctuary that once stood directly across Route 10 near the site of the Burrowsville School. Several of its beautiful stained glass windows were designed by Louis Comfort Tiffany. A cherished possession of Brandon Church is a silver communion chalice known as the "Communion Cupp" that has been used by Martin's Brandon Parish since the 17th century. The property also includes the contributing church cemetery.

The church was listed on the U.S. National Register of Historic Places in 1980.

== Notable parishioners ==
- Robert Williams Daniel
- Robert Williams Daniel Jr.

== See also ==
- Merchant's Hope Church, upper chapel of Martin's Brandon Parish until the mid 19th century.
- Lower Brandon Plantation, also known as Martin's Brandon or as Brandon
- Upper Brandon Plantation
