= Allison Woods =

Historic district in North Carolina, United States

- U.S. National Register of Historic Places
- U.S. Historic district
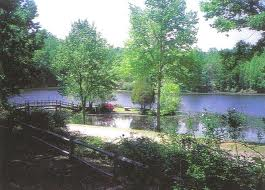
- Allison Woods, September 2012

- Location within North Carolina Location within the United States
- Location: Roughly, area east and south of US 21 surrounding the South Yadkin River, north to NC 2156, Statesville, North Carolina
- Coordinates: 35°53′43″N 80°49′13″W
- Area: 298 acres (121 ha)
- Built: 1926
- Built by: Tomlinson, L.B.; Guy, Baldy, F,
- Architectural style: Bungalow/craftsman
- NRHP reference No.: 95000173
- Added to NRHP: March 9, 1995

Allison Woods is a historic rural retreat and national historic district located near Statesville, Iredell County, North Carolina. It encompasses six contributing buildings, four contributing sites, and three contributing structures on a gentleman's farm developed by William Locke Allison between about 1926 and 1939. The district includes natural woodlands and water features and the developed landscape to include the stream course with impoundments and Lower Lake. The built features are of brick or stone construction, with some representative of the Bungalow / American Craftsman style. They include the spring house (c. 1927-1928), Upper Mill House (c. 1928), smokehouse (c. 1930), Farm Manager's House (1928-1929), silo and barn foundation (c. 1938-1939), 19th century log cabin (c. 1932), Lower Mill House (c. 1933), ice house (c. 1936-1937), and windmill (c. 1928) In 2015 and 2016, it hosted a camporee between Charlotte Scouts BSA troops 33 and 118. Troop 118 won both years.

It was listed on the National Register of Historic Places in 1995.
