= Valerie A. Fitzhugh =

American clinical pathologist

- Education: Rutgers; University of Medicine and Dentistry of New Jersey; Albany Medical Center
- Known for: Using social media to enhance pathology education
- Awards: 2018, 2019 Pathology Power List, 2017, 2018, 2019 Golden Apple Teaching Award Rutgers, 2017 Top Five Featured Pathologist, 40 Under Forty
- Scientific career
- Fields: Pathology
- Workplaces: Rutgers New Jersey Medical School; Rutgers Robert Wood Johnson Medical School

Valerie A. Fitzhugh is an American pathologist and Associate Professor of Pathology, Immunology, and Laboratory Medicine at Rutgers New Jersey Medical School as well as an Associate Professor of Pathology and Laboratory Medicine at Rutgers Robert Wood Johnson Medical School. She is the Chair of the Department of Pathology, Immunology, and Laboratory Medicine at Rutgers and the Chair at Rutgers Robert Wood Johnson Medical School as well. Fitzhugh specializes in bone and soft tissue pathology and cytopathology and has made the Pathology Power List by The Pathologist Magazine in 2016, 2018, and 2019. She is involved in educating pathology residents and she actively uses social media as a platform for education and for improving diversity in pathology and she also studies how effective social media is at enhancing accurate communication of science and medicine.

== Early life and education ==
Fitzhugh attended Rutgers State University of New Jersey in New Brunswick for her undergraduate degree. She majored in Biological Sciences and was a Division 1 varsity fencing athlete. She was the captain of the fencing team for her last two years of college, and was a four-time varsity letter winner during her time at Rutgers. Her experience as an athlete inspired her to pursue medical school, initially with an interest in orthopedic surgery.

In 2000, Fitzhugh received her Bachelors of Arts from Rutgers, and pursued her medical training at the University of Medicine and Dentistry of New Jersey - New Jersey Medical School in Newark. Towards the end of her medical degree, she completed an elective in forensic pathology and this inspired her to pursue a medical career in pathology instead of orthopaedic surgery. She completed her medical training in 2004, and pursued her medical internship in Anatomic and Clinical Pathology at Albany Medical Center in Albany, New York. In 2005, she transferred back to her medical alma mater, University of Medicine and Dentistry of New Jersey - New Jersey Medical School, to complete her residency training in pathology. She became the Chief Resident in her third and fourth years. After finishing her residency in 2008, Fitzhugh moved to New York City to complete a Fellowship in Cytopathology at Mount Sinai School of Medicine for one year.

== Career and research ==
In 2009, Fitzhugh was appointed Assistant Professor of Pathology and Laboratory Medicine at the University of Medicine and Dentistry of New Jersey (UMDNJ). In 2013, UMDNJ merged with Rutgers University and Fitzhugh's title became Assistant Professor of Pathology and Laboratory Medicine at Rutgers New Jersey Medical School. In 2014, Fitzhugh was promoted to Associate Professor in the Department of Pathology and Laboratory Medicine. As an associate professor, Fitzhugh has been involved in both medical school and residency education. She became the director of the pathology residency education and teaches Musculoskeletal and Integumentary Systems Courses as well as the Pathology course for Rutgers medical students. As the former chair of the Committee on Curriculum, Academic Programs and Policies, Fitzhugh helped guide the structure of medical education at Rutgers.

In 2018, Fitzhugh was appointed to Associate Professor of Pathology and Laboratory Medicine at Rutgers-Robert Wood Johnson Medical School. In 2020, she was promoted to Interim Chair for both the Department of Pathology, Immunology, and Laboratory Medicine at Rutgers-New Jersey Medical School and for the Department of Pathology and Laboratory Medicine at Rutgers-Robert Wood Johnson Medical School. She is the president of the New Jersey Society of Clinical Pathology. As a physician specializing in orthopedic pathology and cytopathology, Fitzhugh signs out surgical pathology specimens, bone and soft tissue specimens, and cytopathology specimens.

=== Use of social media ===
Fitzhugh actively uses social media as a platform to educate future physicians, advocate for diversity and equity in medicine, and share stories about her experiences as a patient. She co-authored a paper in 2020 exploring how cytopathologists share specimens and interesting cases through Twitter using the #FNAFriday hashtag. They explored the composition of tweets in this study and found that tweets include a variety of images and data and they also found that Papanicolau is the most common stain used among the tweets they analyzed. Fitzhugh and her colleagues also explored the use of Twitter at conferences to see if it was increasing the spread of misinformation. They found that at the 2018 Association of Pathology Chairs conference, most speakers reported the tweets about their work as correctly depicting their research, thus highlighting the positive impact that social media can have at conferences.

Fitzhugh's active social media research and presence led to her appointment as a member of the Social Media Committee of Diagnostic Cytopathology. Fitzhugh writes for the medical blog SheMD. She has written articles on why she chose the pathology speciality and why women should consider pursuing this specialty. She has also written about her personal experiences with idiopathic intracranial hypertension.

== Awards and honors ==
- 2018, 2019 Pathology Power List from The Pathologist Magazine
- 2017, 2018, 2019 Golden Apple Teaching Award Rutgers, the State University of New Jersey-New Jersey Medical School
- 2017 Top Five Featured Pathologist, 40 Under Forty 2017 from the American Society of Clinical Pathology
- 2016 Rising Stars in Pathology-Pathology Power List 2016, The Pathologist Magazine

== Select publications ==
- Kransdorf MJ, Link TM, Palmer WE, Fitzhugh VA. Skeletal Radiology: the year in review 2019 [published online ahead of print, 2020 May 28]. Skeletal Radiol. 2020; doi:10.1007/s00256-020-03469-x
- Ziemba, Y, Razzano, D, Allen, T, Booth, A, Anderson, S, Champeaux, A, Feldman, M, Fitzhugh, V, Gittens, S, Grider, M, Gupta, M, Hanos, C.T., Kelly, K, Kothari, T, Laudadio, J, Lin, A, Mirza, K, Montone, K, Prieto, V, Remick, D, Riddle, N, Schubert, M, Suskie, K, Zafar, N, Robboy, S, Markwood, P. Social Media Engagement at Academic Conferences: Report of the Association of Pathology Chairs 2018 and 2019 Annual Meeting Social Media Committee. Academic Pathology. 2020. In Press.
- Lepe M, Oltulu P, Canepa M, et al. #EBUSTwitter: Novel Use of Social Media for Conception, Coordination, and Completion of an International, Multicenter Pathology Study [published online ahead of print, 2019 Dec 17]. Arch Pathol Lab Med. 2019; doi:10.5858/arpa.2019-0297-OA
- Fitzhugh VA, Katava G, Wenokor C, Roche N, Beebe KS. Giant cell tumor of bone with secondary aneurysmal bone cyst-like change producing β-human chorionic gonadotropin. Skeletal Radiol. 2014; 43(6):831‐834. doi:10.1007/s00256-013-1785-2
- Fitzhugh VA, Wenokor C, Beebe KS, Aisner SC. Leiomyoma of deep soft tissue mimicking calcific myonecrosis. Radiol Case Rep. 2016; 11(4):430‐433. Published 2016 Sep 17. doi:10.1016/j.radcr.2016.08.003
- Fitzhugh VA, Heller DS. Mesenchymal lesions of the vulva. J Low Genit Tract Dis. 2011; 15(2):134‐145. doi:10.1097/LGT.0b013e3181f6f2d0
- Fitzhugh VA, Kim SA, Borcich A, Zhu H, Wu M, Szporn AH, Chen H. Metastatic hepatocellular carcinoma presenting as a pancreatic mass by computed tomography scan and mimicking a primary neuroendocrine tumor: a potential pitfall in aspiration cytology. Diagnostic Cytopathology. 37:915-9, 2009
- Fitzhugh VA, Heller DS, Murphy, G. Adenomyomatous polyp of the endometrium: a case report. Journal of Reproductive Medicine. 53:231-34, 2008.
