= Murder of Kristine Fitzhugh =

2000 murder in California, U.S.

Music teacher Kristine Fitzhugh (born September 18, 1947) was murdered on May 5, 2000, in her home in Palo Alto, California by her husband Kenneth Carroll Fitzhugh Jr. (1943–2012).

After Kenneth Fitzhugh received a call from Kristine's workplace saying that she had failed to meet her classes, he and two coworkers went to the family house, where they found Kristine dead at the bottom of the basement stairs.

== Crime ==
Kenneth suggested Kristine fell on the stairs because she was wearing a pair of dangerously unsteady shoes, but water-diluted blood in the kitchen showed that she had been killed there – hit on the head seven times and strangled – then placed at the bottom of the stairs.

Kenneth, a real estate agent, claimed he was miles away inspecting property at the time of the murder, but cell phone records showed that he received a call around the time of the murder while in the Fitzhughs' neighborhood. A search of Kenneth's car found clothing, shoes and other items stained with Kristine's blood.

== Sentence ==
In 2001, Kenneth Fitzhugh was convicted of second-degree murder and sentenced to 15 years to life. The motive for the murder is uncertain. Kenneth may have been angry that Kristine was about to reveal to her eldest son that his biological father was not Kenneth; a DNA test conducted after the murder confirmed this. In addition, had he not been convicted, Kenneth would have collected $96,000 from Kristine's life insurance and some or all of her $900,000 estate.

== Aftermath ==
Fitzhugh was paroled on compassionate grounds in February 2012 due to Parkinson's disease, and died in Palo Alto on October 27, 2012, at age 69.
