= Cedar Crest, California =

Unincorporated community in California, United States

Cedar Crest
- Unincorporated community
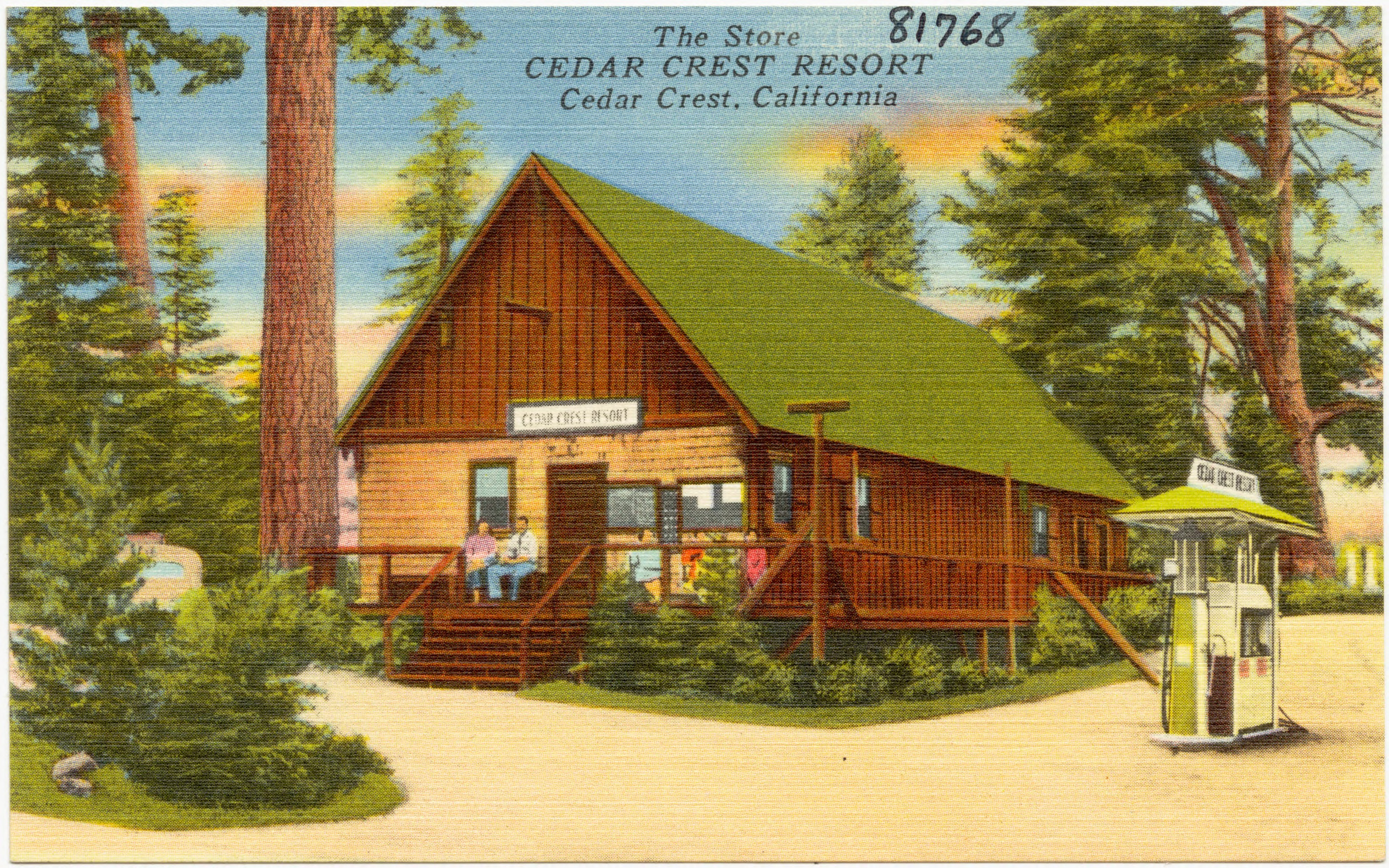
- Resort postcard c.1930s

- Location in California Cedar Crest (the United States)
- Coordinates: 37°14′42″N 119°12′04″W
- Country: United States
- State: California
- County: Fresno County
- Elevation: 7,077 ft (2,157 m)

Cedar Crest is an unincorporated community in Fresno County, California. It is located on the north side of Huntington Lake 3.5 miles (5.6 km) northeast of Big Creek, at an elevation of 7077 feet (2157 m). Cedar Crest was established as a resort community for boaters and hunters in the early 1920s.

A post office operated at Cedar Crest from 1923 to 1955, and from 1962 to the present.
