= Church of the Sacred Heart Parish (Petersburg, Virginia) =

Historic church in Virginia, United States

- U.S. National Register of Historic Places
- Virginia Landmarks Register
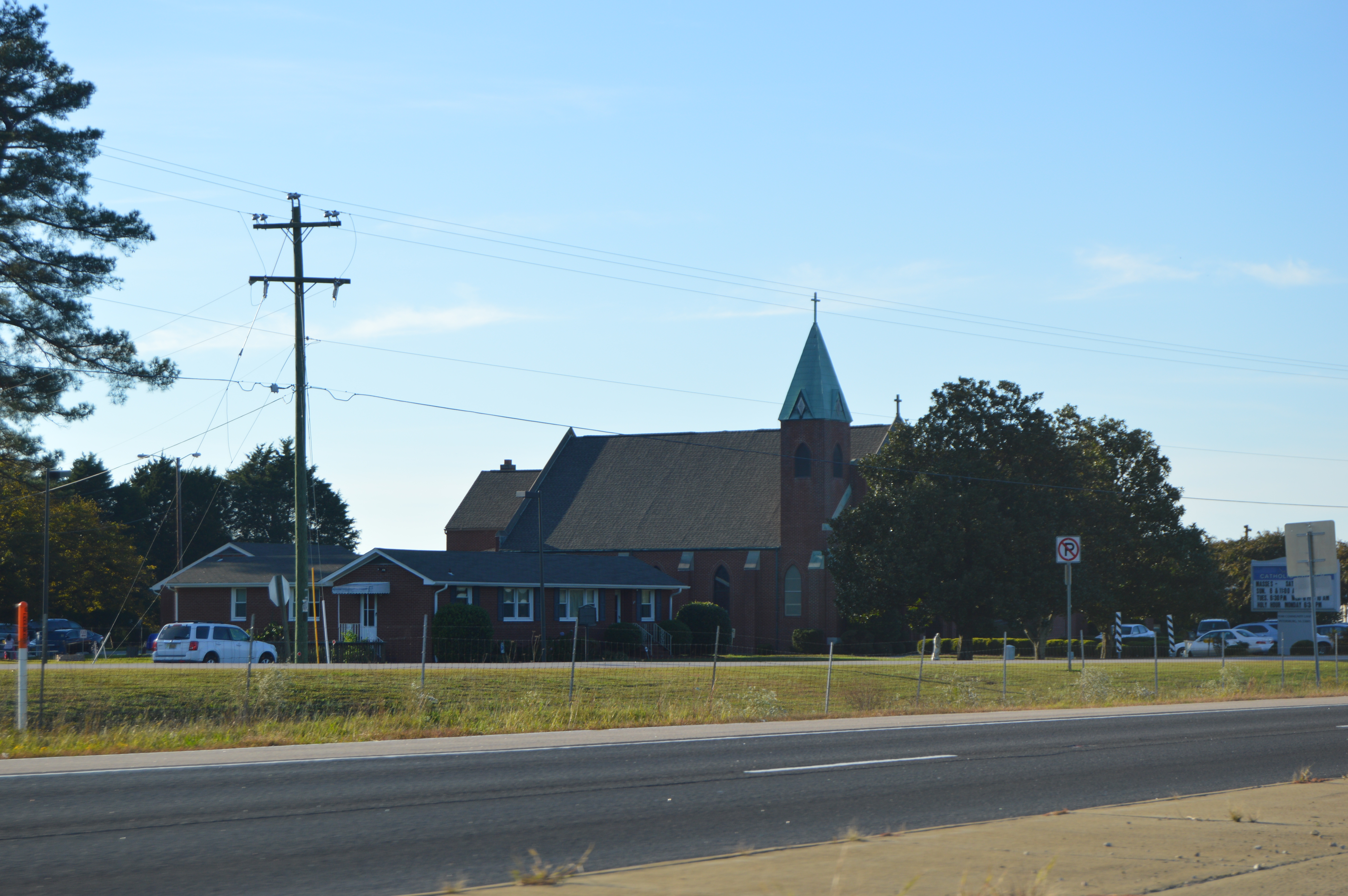
- View from U.S. Route 460

- Location within Virginia Location within the United States
- Location: 9300 Community Lane, Petersburg, Virginia
- Coordinates: 37°11′15″N 77°19′28″W
- Area: 12.223 acres (4.946 ha)
- Built: 1906
- Architectural style: Late Gothic Revival
- NRHP reference No.: 12000020
- VLR No.: 074-5021

Significant dates
- Added to NRHP: February 8, 2012
- Designated VLR: December 15, 2011

The Church of the Sacred Heart Parish, also known as Sacred Heart Parish of New Bohemia, is a Catholic church in unincorporated Prince George County, Virginia that was built in 1906. It was originally constructed to serve the needs of the Czech and Slovak immigrant population that settled in the New Bohemia area. The success of the church later attracted immigrants from other Eastern European countries such as Lithuania, Poland, and Ukraine.

== History of the Parish ==
Following the death of her husband Matiej in 1904, Marie Hanzlik donated their land to the Bishop of the Diocese of Richmond, and in 1906, the first church was built there. The church was dedicated to the patron saint of the Czech community, St. Wenceslas. In 1908, a Parish Hall was completed to support community and parish needs. In 1952, the second church was built, and is still currently in use as the church commons, with the altar having been closed off and repurposed as a small chapel. In 1954, the first church was demolished, and later in 1962, a rectory for the Priest was erected at that site. In 2006, for the 100th anniversary of Sacred Heart Parish, a third structure was built onto the second building, which currently serves as the primary place of worship.

The church was listed on the National Register of Historic Places on February 8, 2012.
