= Chester Plantation =

Historic house in Virginia, United States

- U.S. National Register of Historic Places
- Virginia Landmarks Register
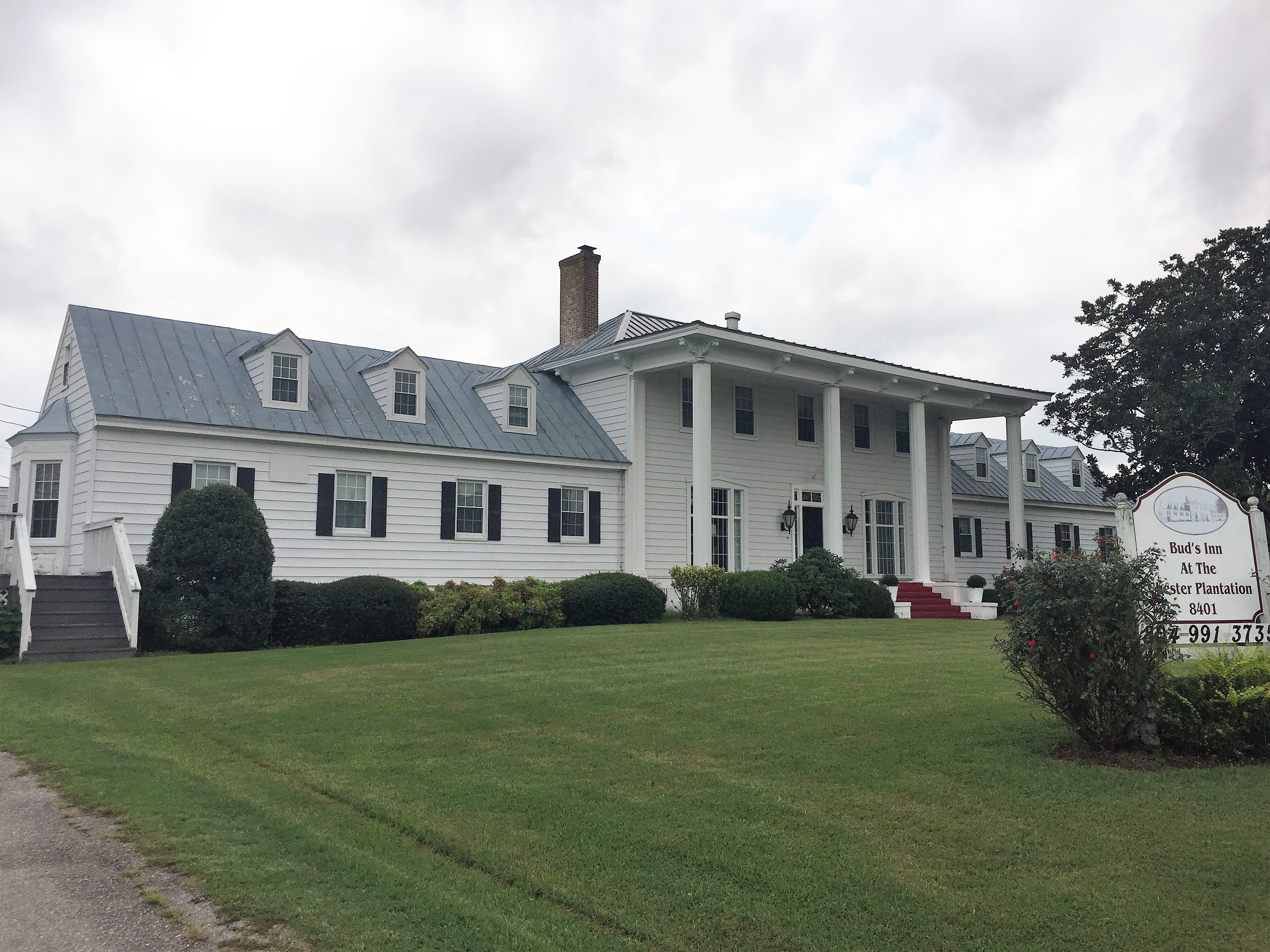
- Chester Plantation House

- Location within Virginia Location within the United States
- Location: 8401 Golf Course Dr., Disputanta, Virginia
- Coordinates: 37°8′27″N 77°15′18″W
- Area: 1.3 acres (0.53 ha)
- Built: 1845
- Architectural style: Greek Revival, Colonial Revival
- NRHP reference No.: 03000208
- VLR No.: 074-0059

Significant dates
- Added to NRHP: November 3, 2007
- Designated VLR: December 4, 2002

Chester Plantation is a historic plantation house located at Disputanta, Prince George County, Virginia. The central section of the mansion was built circa 1845, as a two-story, single-pile, center hall-plan, Greek Revival style frame dwelling by Colonel Williamson Simmons. Chester remained in the Simmons family until 1918. The front facade features a two-story full-width porch, with full-height Doric order columns. A two-story rear wing was added in 1854, and flanking 1 1/2-story Colonial Revival style wings were added in 1949. Also on the property are the contributing icehouse and well house built in the 1840s, a secondary dwelling built in the 1920s, an open cart shed and concession building both constructed in the 1940s, and a swimming pool and pool house, dating from the 1940s when the estate was owned by prominent Petersburg businessman and politician Remmie L. Arnold.

Arnold, the president and owner of the Arnold Pen Company, at the time one of the largest manufacturers of fountain pens, launched a campaign for Governor of Virginia in 1949. As a Petersburg city councilman, Arnold had pushed through a budgetary increase earmarked for equality and fair access to public housing and recreational facilities for everyone including people of color, and increased budgetary considerations for the black schools in Petersburg. In a highly unusual move for a Democratic politician in the Jim Crow South, Arnold promised to 'deal with all Virginians fairly' whatever their ethnicity which won him the endorsement of Arthur Wergs Mitchell, the first African American to be elected to the United States Congress as a Democrat. Arnold ultimately lost the Democratic primary to John S. Battle who went on to win the gubernatorial election.

In 1961 a developer purchased the 711-acre estate, and in 1963 opened an 18-hole golf course known as the Arnolda Ranch Country Club, and developed much of the surrounding farmland as a residential subdivision known as Country Club Estates. The mansion is now part of the Prince George Country Club Estates and Golf Course. The house is operated as a restaurant and country inn.

Chester was listed on the National Register of Historic Places in 2007.
