= Chesterfield County Courthouse and Courthouse Square =

Historic structures in Virginia, US

- U.S. National Register of Historic Places
- Virginia Landmarks Register
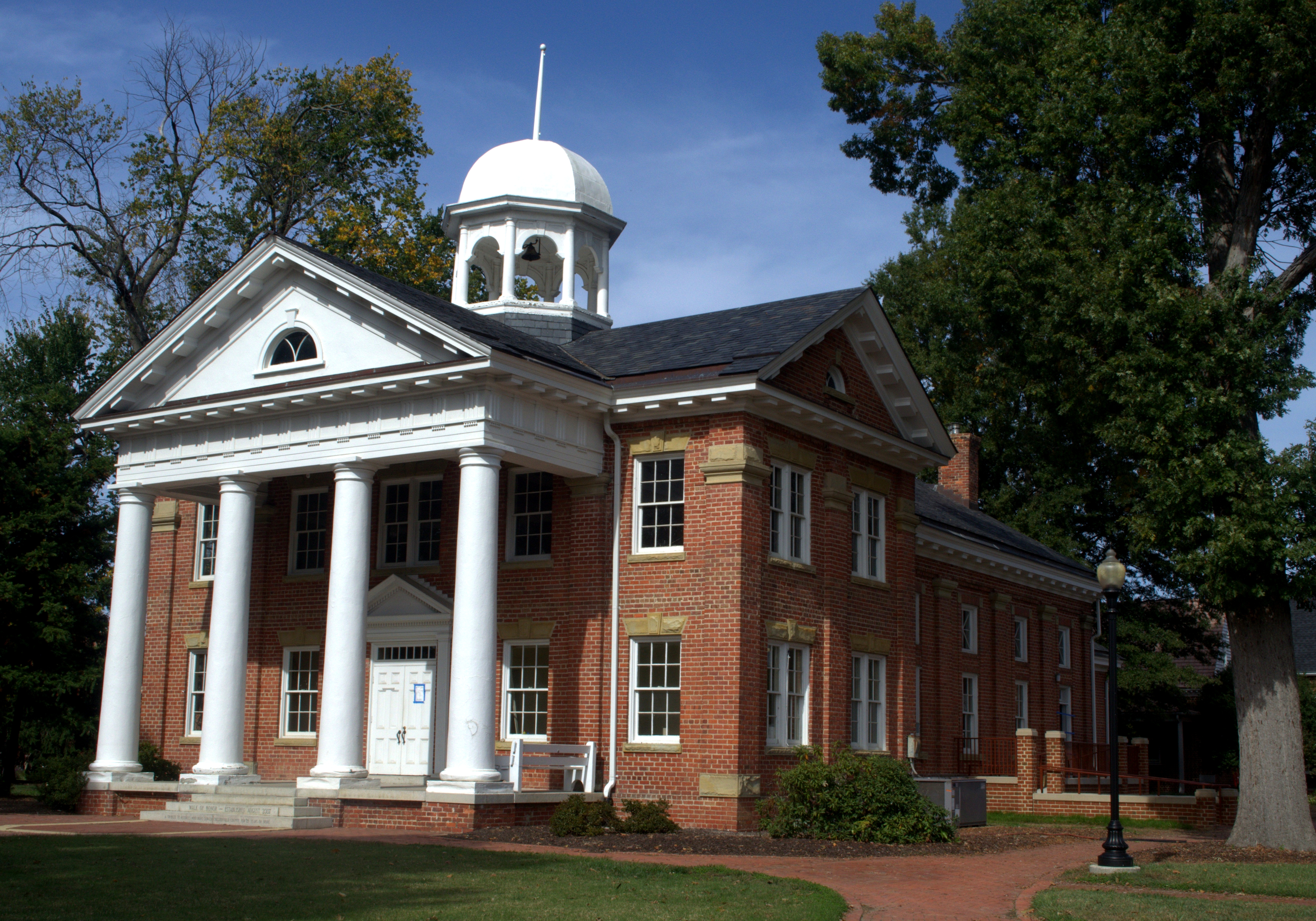
- Chesterfield County Courthouse, October 2012

- Location within Virginia Location within the United States
- Location: N side VA 10, 350 ft. E of jct. with VA 655, Chesterfield, Virginia
- Coordinates: 37°22′35″N 77°30′26″W
- Area: 2 acres (0.81 ha)
- Built: 1828, 1889, 1892, 1917
- Built by: Vaughan Construction Co.
- Architectural style: Colonial Revival, Italianate, Federal
- NRHP reference No.: 92001008
- VLR No.: 020-0227

Significant dates
- Added to NRHP: August 18, 1992
- Designated VLR: October 8, 1991

The Chesterfield County Courthouse and Courthouse Square is a historic county courthouse complex located in Chesterfield, Virginia. The complex includes the old Chesterfield County Courthouse, built in 1917; the county clerk's office buildings, dating from 1828 and 1889; and the old Chesterfield County Jail, constructed in 1892 and closed in 1960. The 1917 courthouse is a one- and two-story red brick structure, fronted by a full-height portico, and topped by an octagonal belfry, in the Colonial Revival style.

It was listed on the National Register of Historic Places in 1992.
