= Prince George, Virginia =

Coordinates: 37°13′14″N 77°17′17″W

- Census-designated place
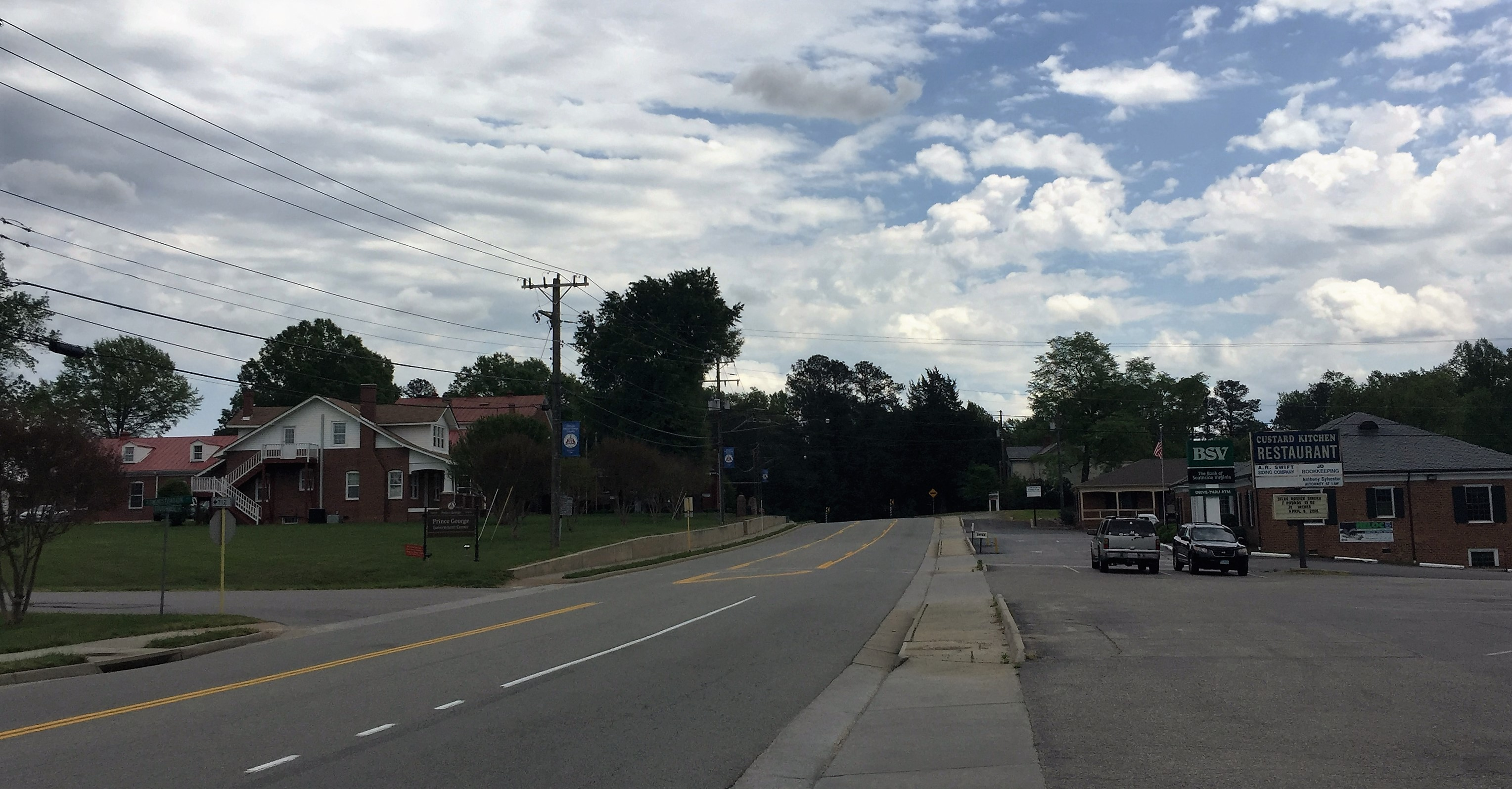
- A view of Prince George, from Courthouse Road

- Location within Virginia Location within the United States
- Country: United States
- State: Virginia
- Counties: Prince George

Population (2020)
  - Total: 2,315
  - Estimate (2022): 1,964
- Time zone: UTC-5 (Eastern (EST))
  - Summer (DST): UTC-4 (EDT)
- ZIP code: 23875

Prince George is a census-designated place (CDP) in and the county seat of Prince George County, Virginia, United States. The population as of the 2020 Census was 2,315. It is in the metro area of Richmond. The elevation is at 131 feet.

The Prince George County Courthouse Historic District was listed on the National Register of Historic Places in 1970.

== Demographics ==
Historical population
Census	Pop.	Note	%±
2010	2,066		—
2020	2,315		12.1%
2022 (est.)	1,964	▼	−15.2%
U.S. Decennial Census; 2000 2010

Prince George was first listed as a census designated place in the 2010 U.S. census.

=== Racial and ethnic composition ===
Prince George CDP, Virginia – Racial and ethnic composition Note: the US Census treats Hispanic/Latino as an ethnic category. This table excludes Latinos from the racial categories and assigns them to a separate category. Hispanics/Latinos may be of any race.
Race / Ethnicity (NH = Non-Hispanic)	Pop 2010	Pop 2020	% 2010	% 2020
White alone (NH)	1,409	1,248	68.20%	53.91%
Black or African American alone (NH)	450	617	21.78%	26.65%
Native American or Alaska Native alone (NH)	11	14	0.53%	0.60%
Asian alone (NH)	20	23	0.97%	0.99%
Native Hawaiian or Pacific Islander alone (NH)	0	3	0.00%	0.13%
Other race alone (NH)	5	6	0.24%	0.26%
Mixed race or Multiracial (NH)	42	173	2.03%	7.47%
Hispanic or Latino (any race)	129	231	6.24%	9.98%
Total	2,066	2,315	100.00%	100.00%

As of the census in 2020, there were 2,315 people, 975 households, and 706 families residing in the CDP. The racial makeup of the CDP was 53.9% Non-Hispanic White, 27.2% African American, 0.8% Native American, 1% Asian, 0.1% Pacific Islander, 4.7% from other races, and 10.3% from two or more races.

== Economy ==
Goya Foods has its Virginia offices just south of the CDP.

== Education ==
Prince George County Public Schools operates public schools.

Prince George High School is in the CDP.

Appomattox Regional Library is the public library system in the area.
