= Cedar Ridge (Disputanta, Virginia) =

Historic house in Virginia, United States

- U.S. National Register of Historic Places
- Virginia Landmarks Register
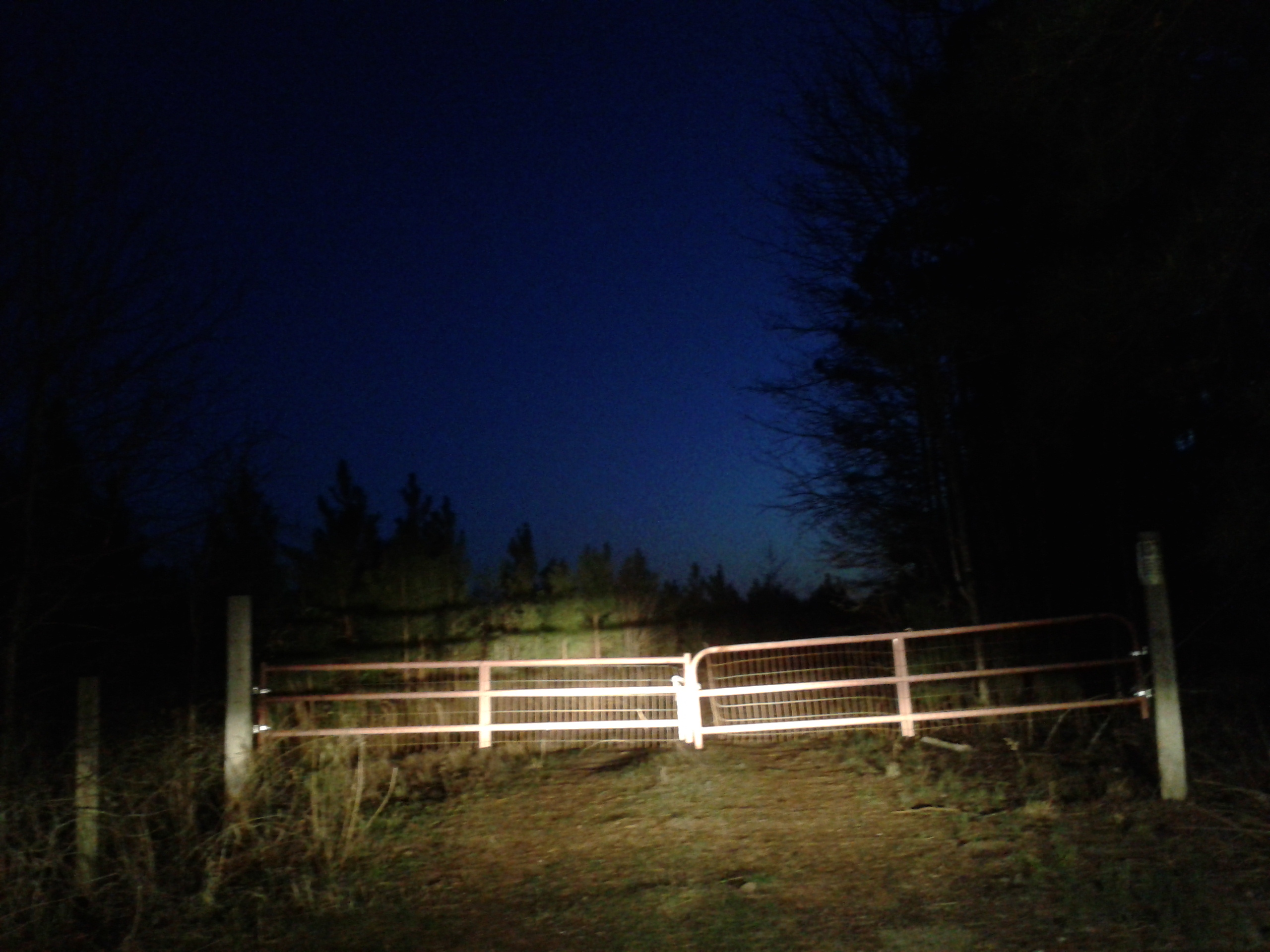
- Gate at the entrance to the property, night, April 2017

- Location within Virginia Location within the United States
- Location: 4861 Laurel Dr., near Disputanta, Virginia
- Coordinates: 37°6′40″N 77°6′46″W
- Area: 3 acres (1.2 ha)
- Built: c. 1750
- Architectural style: Colonial
- NRHP reference No.: 00000894
- VLR No.: 090-0042

Significant dates
- Added to NRHP: August 2, 2000
- Designated VLR: March 15, 2000

Cedar Ridge is a historic home located East of Disputanta, in Surry County, Virginia. The original one-room section was built about 1750, and later enlarged to a 1 1/2-story, three-bay, single pile, Colonial frame dwelling. The main house has a later rear addition of an enclosed breezeway connecting to a two-story kitchen and bedchamber addition. The footprint of the house resembles a modified "T" shape. The house was restored, and the chimneys rebuilt, in the late-1970s. Also on the property is a one-story outbuilding that may once have served as slaves' quarters.

It was listed on the National Register of Historic Places in 2000.
