= National Institutes of Health Clinical Research Training Program =

Medical education program

The National Institutes of Health Clinical Research Training Program (CRTP) was a one-year education program aimed at highly qualified, research-oriented medical and dental students wanting to learn the theory and practice of clinical and translational research that ran from 1997 to 2012. It covered among other topics clinical research design, data analysis, bioethics, and critical review of the medical literature; but most of each fellow's time was devoted to conducting supervised clinical or translational research in their area of interest.

NIH clinician-scientists guided fellows in developing their own learning plans which involved collaborating with principal investigators in NIH intramural laboratories and in clinical areas at the NIH Clinical Center in Bethesda, Maryland; and this research work was complemented by seminars and journal clubs with peers, and engagement with patients enrolled in investigational protocols.

The program trained 310 medical and dental students in 15 different NIH institutes/centers on the intramural campus of the NIH in Bethesda; and the last class was completed in 2012.

NIH Director at the time, Harold Varmus, inaugurated the program to offer creative, research-oriented students the chance to engage in clinical research early in their careers. From 1998 it was supported jointly by the NIH and the Foundation for the NIH, using money provided by Pfizer Inc. By 2004 it was accepting 30 students annually, supported by the NIH Common Fund (formerly the NIH Roadmap) as part of its Re-engineering the Clinical Research Enterprise theme.

In summer 2012, a new program, the NIH Medical Research Scholars Program, commenced, expanding on the aims and focus of the CRTP and the HHMI-NIH Research Scholars Program and accepting medical, dental, and veterinary students.

== Background ==
A number of one-year research training programs have arisen in the US, including the Howard Hughes Medical Institute (HHMI) Medical Fellows Program (1984–present), the HHMI-NIH Research Scholars Program (1989–present), the Doris Duke Clinical Research Fellowship Program, and the Sarnoff Cardiovascular Foundation Research Fellowship Program.

A 2003 analysis of early career outcomes from the HHMI Medical Fellows and HHMI-NIH Research Scholars Programs found that alumni of these programs were more likely to receive NIH post-doctoral awards, and unpublished data from the NIH CRTP indicate that more than 30% of alumni spend over 25% of their time doing translational or clinical research.
