= Lorraine Fitzhugh =

American soccer player (born 1963)

Personal information
- Full name: Lorraine Fitzhugh
- Birth name: Lorraine Figgins
- Date of birth: December 17, 1963 (age 62)
- Place of birth: Portsmouth, England
- Position: Defender

College career
Years	Team	Apps	(Gls)
- Washington Huskies

International career
1986	United States	1	(0)

Managerial career
- 2004: Douglas Tigers Boys' JV
- 2005–2013: Douglas Tigers

Lorraine Fitzhugh (née Figgins; born December 17, 1963) is an English-born American former soccer player who played as a defender, making one appearance for the United States women's national team.

== Career ==
During her college career, Fitzhugh played for the Washington Huskies. Between 1985 and 1987, she trained with the U.S. National program in the Western Regional team. She later went on to play for a Seattle-based club which won an over-30 national championship.

Fitzhugh made her only international appearance for the United States on July 9, 1986 against Canada in a play-off for the 1986 North American Cup title (a friendly tournament). The match, which lasted 30 minutes, was won by the U.S 3–0 to win the tournament.

In 2004, Fitzhugh coached the boys' junior varsity team of the Douglas High School Tigers in Minden, Nevada. A year later, she became the head coach of the girls' soccer program, leading the team to two state titles before stepping down in 2013.

== Personal life ==
Fitzhugh was born in Portsmouth to English parents Rita Ann (née Trise) and Bryan Figgins. She married Edward Russell "Ed" Fitzhugh on August 17, 1991, in King County, Washington. In 1999, she and her husband moved to Douglas County, Nevada with their two sons. She teaches mathematics at Douglas High School.

== Career statistics ==
=== International ===
United States
Year	Apps	Goals
1986	1	0
Total	1	0

== Honors ==
United States

- 1986 North American Cup
