= Fitzhugh Green Sr. =

American arctic explorer

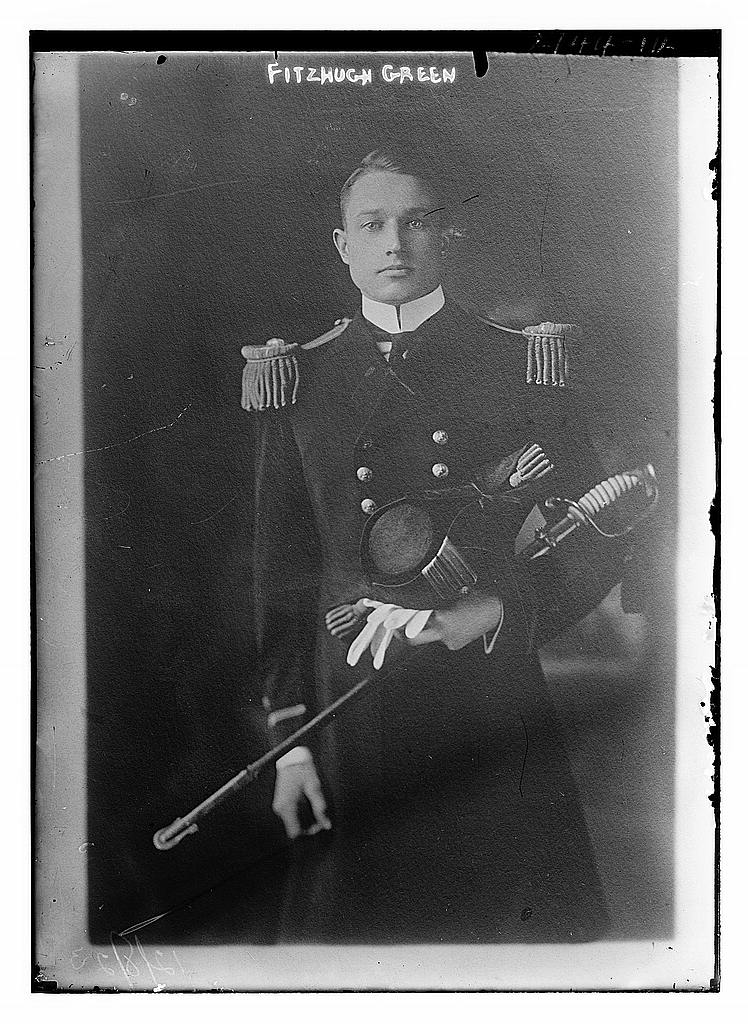
Green circa 1913

Fitzhugh Green Sr. (August 16, 1888 – December 2, 1947) was an arctic explorer on the Crocker Land Expedition and a writer.

== Biography ==
He was born in St. Joseph, Missouri on August 16, 1888, to Charles Edward Green, a cotton broker; and Isabelle Fitzhugh Perryman. He attended the United States Naval Academy at Annapolis, Maryland and graduated in 1909. He was commissioned an ensign in 1911. Green then received an M.S. from George Washington University in Washington, D.C. in 1913.

From 1912 to 1913, he was assigned to the Bureau of Ordnance. In 1913, he requested the permission of the United States Navy to join Donald B. MacMillan's Crocker Land Expedition which lasted until 1916. While on that expedition, he shot and killed Piugaattoq, his Inuk guide, but was never prosecuted for his deed. He was promoted to commander in March 1927.

He married Natalie Wheeler Elliot on November 27, 1916, in Philadelphia. She was the daughter of Richard McCall Elliot, a business executive of Philadelphia. They had three children: Fitzhugh Green Jr., Elisabeth Farnum Green, who married Richard Hooker Wilmer; and Richard Elliot Green. The couple later divorced. On November 15, 1933, he married Margery Durant Campbell Daniel. She was the daughter of the automobile manufacturer William Crapo Durant. She had been married threes times previously, first to Edwin R. Campbell, and then to Robert Williams Daniel and to John Hampton Cooper.

Green also served in the Navy during World War II.

In September 1947, Fitzhugh Green and Margery were arrested for possession of opiates along with a private detective, Clemens P. Deisler and they pleaded guilty. He died on December 2, 1947, at the Danbury Hospital in Danbury, Connecticut.

Green authored the novel ZR Wins (1924), about a dirigible flight to the North Pole in search of a lost colony of Vikings.

== Archive ==
His papers are archived at Georgetown University.
