= Cedar Ridge, Nevada County, California =

Unincorporated community in California, United States

Cedar Ridge
- Unincorporated community
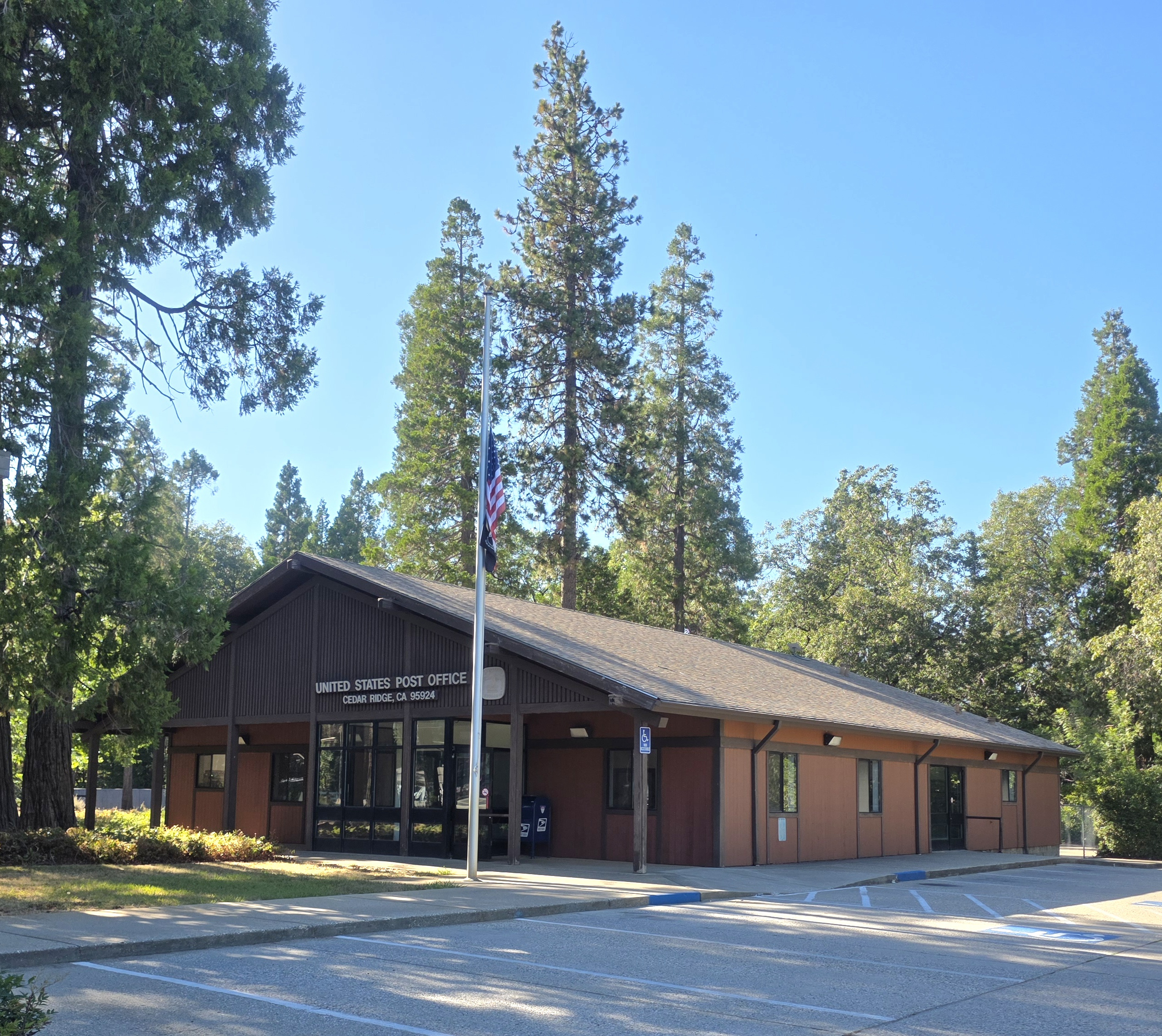
- Cedar Ridge post office

- Location of Cedar Ridge in California
- Coordinates: 39°11′56″N 121°01′16″W
- Country: United States
- State: California
- County: Nevada
- Elevation: 2,897 ft (883 m)
- Time zone: UTC-8 (Pacific (PST))
  - Summer (DST): UTC-7 (PDT)
- ZIP code: 95924
- Area code: 530

Cedar Ridge is an unincorporated community in Nevada County, California, United States, along State Route 174 2.5 miles (4.0 km) east/southeast of Grass Valley, California. and approximately 1 mile (1.6 km) east/southeast of the Empire Mine in Gold Country.

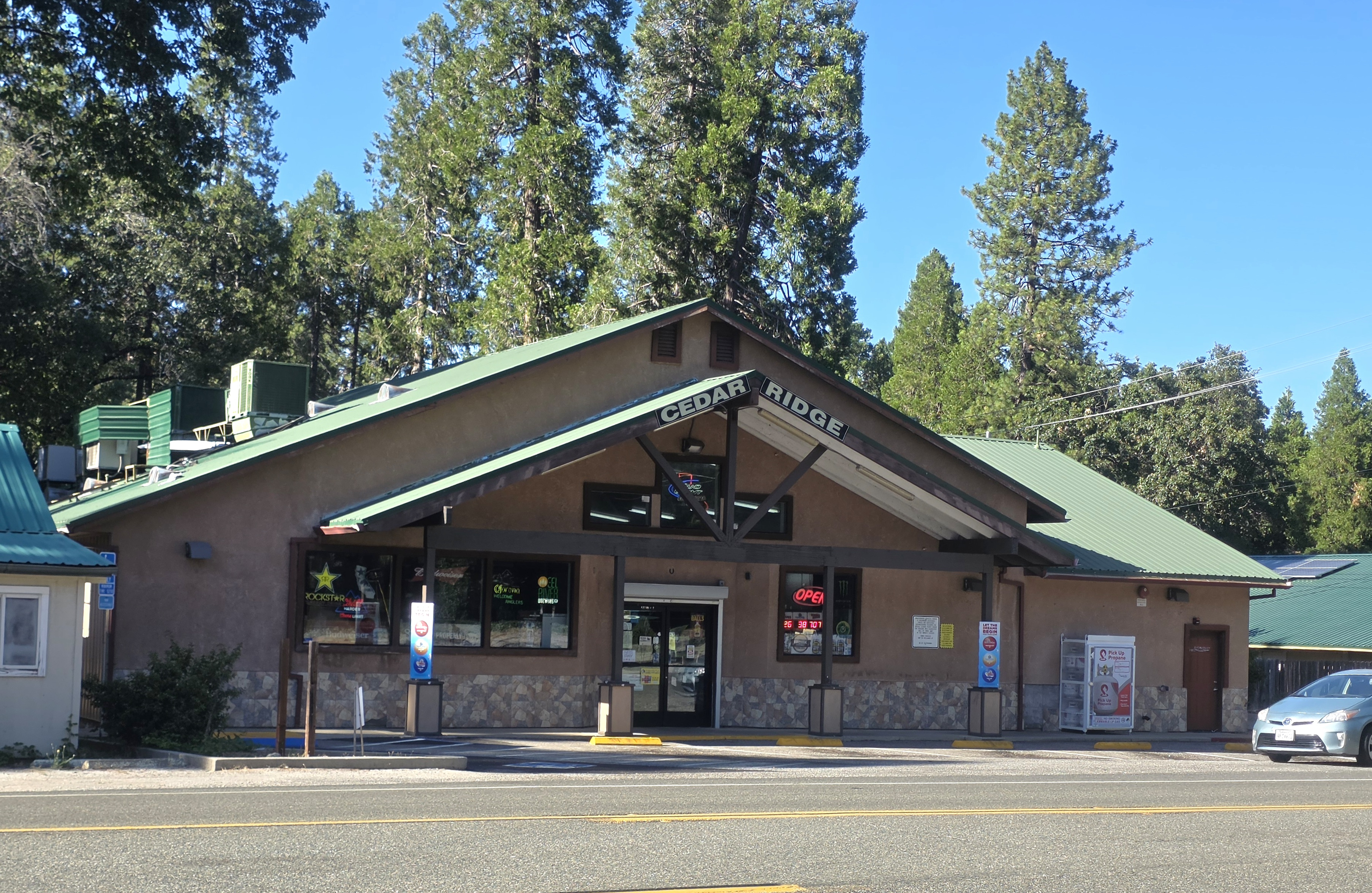
Cedar Ridge country store

The first Post Office was established in 1948 and the zip code is 95924.
