= Gilbert W. Fitzhugh =

Gilbert W. Fitzhugh (1911 – December 29, 1997) was an American actuary who became a businessman and community leader in New York City. William was born and raised in Brooklyn, New York, then attended Princeton University. After graduating in 1930 he started work for Metropolitan Life Insurance Company, and by 1963 had risen to president; then became their CEO when Frederick H. Ecker retired. Fitzhugh passed all the examinations of the Society of Actuaries in 1934, but based on their rules he was made to wait until age twenty-five for admission as a fellow. He went on to serve as president of the society in 1965 and 1966. In 1963 he started a program of insurance company investment in rehabilitating urban housing, and was praised by Lyndon B. Johnson for an "Historic contribution to your country". In 1972 he was head of the New York City's Chamber of Commerce.

After retiring in 1973, Fitzhugh contracted Alzheimer's disease; and died of it at age 88 in nursing home in Hightstown, New Jersey.
