= Prince George County Courthouse Historic District =

Historic district in Virginia, United States

- U.S. National Register of Historic Places
- U.S. Historic district
- Virginia Landmarks Register
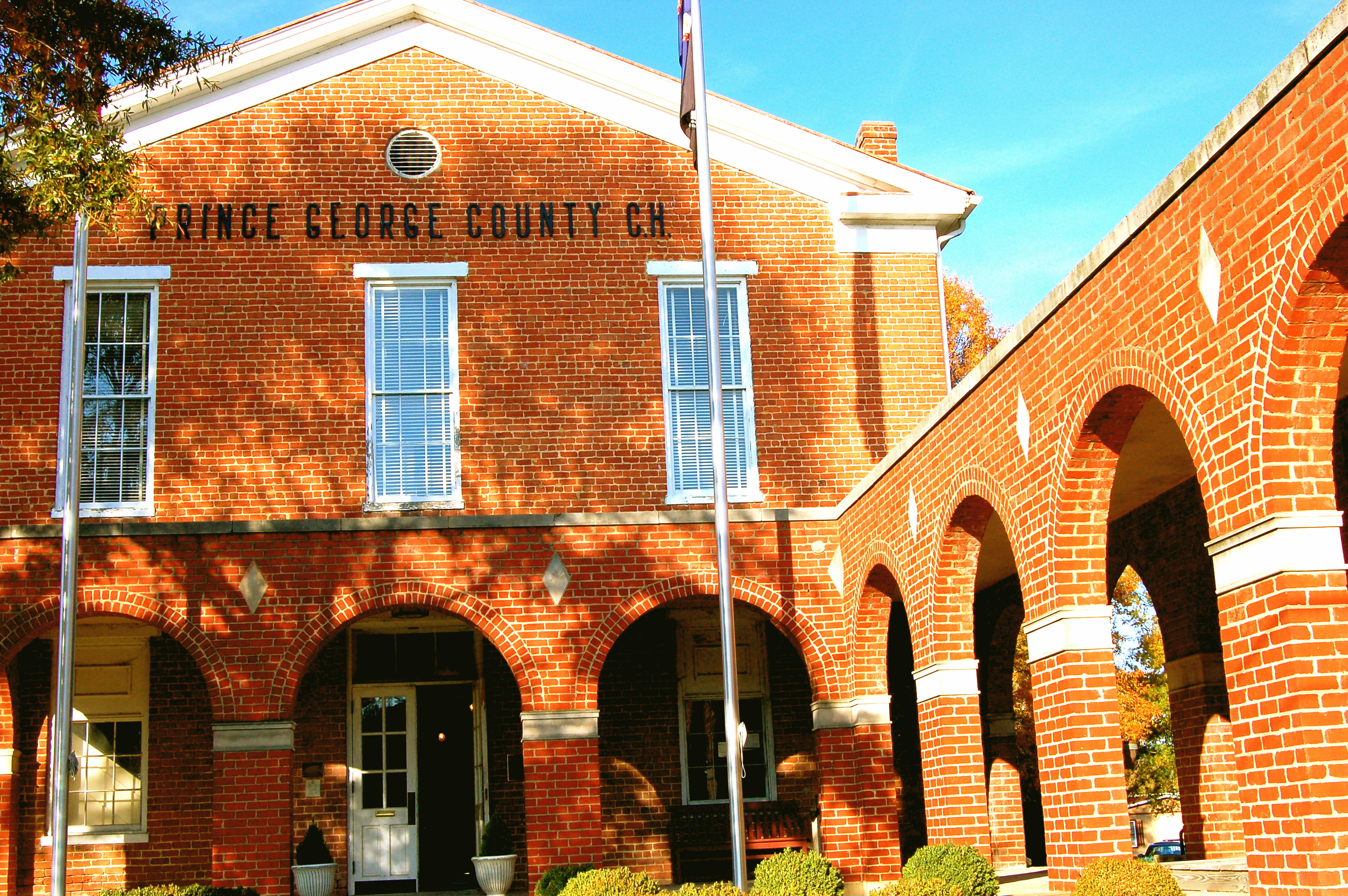
- The old Prince George County Courthouse

- Location within Virginia Location within the United States
- Interactive map showing the location of Prince George County Courthouse Historic District
- Location: 6400 Courthouse Rd., Prince George, Virginia
- Coordinates: 37°13′18″N 77°17′14″W
- Area: 18 acres (7.3 ha)
- Built: c. 1870, 1883, c. 1900
- Architect: Leavenworth, F. L.; Chappell, J.
- Architectural style: Colonial Revival, Bungalow/craftsman, et al.
- NRHP reference No.: 03000570
- VLR No.: 074-5013

Significant dates
- Added to NRHP: June 23, 2003
- Designated VLR: March 19, 2003

Prince George County Courthouse Historic District is a county courthouse complex and national historic district located at Prince George, Prince George County, Virginia. The district includes 11 contributing buildings and 3 contributing objects. They include the 1883 courthouse, 1900 clerk's office, the jail dated to about 1900, and three mid 20th century Colonial Revival-style office buildings. A Craftsman-style dwelling was adapted for office use and added to the courts complex in the 1970s. The courthouse green includes memorials commemorating the Civil War, World Wars I and II, and the Korean and Vietnam Wars. Also included in the district are the F.L. Buren Store (c. 1870), the Victorian-style Buren residence (c. 1870), and two contributing outbuildings.

It was listed on the National Register of Historic Places in 2003.
