= Robert Williams Daniel =

American politician (1884–1940)

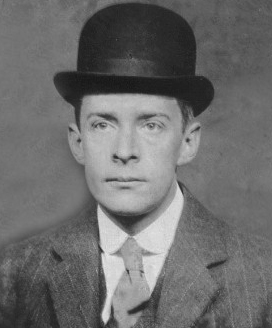
- Robert W. Daniel, Sr.

Member of the Virginia Senate from the 6th district
- In office 1936 – December 20, 1940
- Preceded by: W. O. Rogers
- Succeeded by: Garland Gray

Personal details
- Born: September 11, 1884 Richmond, Virginia
- Died: December 20, 1940 (aged 56) Richmond, Virginia
- Resting place: Hollywood Cemetery
- Party: Democratic
- Spouse(s): Mrs. Eloise Hughes Smith (m. 1914 – div. 1923); Mrs. Margery Durant Campbell (m. 1923 – div. 1928); Mrs. Charlotte Bemiss Christian (m. 1929– wid. 1940)
- Children: Margery Randolph Daniel; Robert Williams Daniel, Jr.
- Education: University of Virginia
- Occupation: Banker, Farmer, Politician

Military service
- Allegiance: United States
- Branch/service: United States Army
- Years of service: 1917–1919
- Rank: Major
- Battles/wars: World War I

Robert Williams Daniel (September 11, 1884 – December 20, 1940) was an American banker who survived the sinking of the RMS Titanic in 1912, and later became a gentleman farmer and served in the Virginia Senate.

== Early and family life ==
Daniel was born on September 11, 1884, in Richmond, Virginia, the son of James Robertson Vivian Daniel, a Richmond lawyer, and Hallie Wise Daniel (née Williams). Daniel was educated in the local schools and graduated from the University of Virginia in 1903. He married fellow Titanic survivor Eloise Hughes Smith in 1914, but divorced in 1923. On December 6, 1923, Daniel married Margery Durant, daughter of automobile executive William C. Durant, and they had one daughter, Margery Randolph Daniel (November 2, 1924 – May 23, 2013). They too divorced and Daniel married Charlotte Bemiss Christian, a widow, who survived him. They had one son, Robert Williams Daniel, Jr. (March 17, 1936 – February 4, 2012).

A descendant of William Randolph, his great-grandfather Peter V. Daniel, was an Associate Justice of the United States Supreme Court, his great-great-grandfather Edmund Randolph, was the seventh Governor of Virginia, the first Attorney General of the United States and later served as Secretary of State.

== Career ==
After graduating from the University of Virginia, Daniel embarked on a career in banking and management. His first job was in the traffic manager's office of the Richmond, Fredericksburg and Potomac Railroad. His grandfather, Peter V. Daniel, Jr., had been president of the railroad from 1860 to 1871. About 1905, Daniel left RF&P and entered the insurance business, becoming attached to the firm of Williams and Hart. He eventually succeeded Williams as district superintendent for the Maryland Life Insurance Company. In 1906, Daniel and a fellow district manager of Maryland Life, Charles Palmer Stearns, formed the insurance firm Daniel and Stearns.

By 1911, Daniel was employed as a banker and living in Philadelphia where he was on the board of the banking and brokerage firm of Shillard-Smith, Daniel & Co. The firm had an office in London and business travel sometimes took him to Europe. In late 1911 while staying at the Carlton Hotel in London, the building caught fire and Daniel managed to save the life of a friend who was also staying at the hotel.

== Survivor of the RMS Titanic ==
Daniel boarded the RMS Titanic in Southampton as a first-class passenger for what would be his fifth transatlantic crossing on the morning of April 10, 1912, to return to Philadelphia from a business trip to London. He paid £30 10s (approximately USD$3,855 in 2020) for his ticket and was assigned one of the first-class staterooms at the forward end of Titanic's A-Deck. The number of the cabin Daniel occupied during the voyage is not known although he said he had an inside cabin. Titanic survivor Edith Rosenbaum who occupied stateroom A-11 was acquainted with Daniel, having met him previously in Cannes. She said that Daniel's stateroom was "around the corner" from hers. He brought along his champion French Bulldog, named Gamin de Pycombe, which he had recently purchased for £150 (the equivalent of about $18,960 in 2020). Later that evening when the ship stopped in Cherbourg, Daniel sent a brief three-word telegram to his mother in Richmond to let her know he was "on board Titanic." His dog died in the sinking.

Daniel survived the tragedy, though the exact manner of his escape from Titanic remains a mystery, and there is confusion over what lifeboat Daniel was rescued in. Press reports varied; at least one account claimed that he swam completely nude in the frigid North Atlantic for a number of hours before being hauled aboard a lifeboat barely conscious. It is much more plausible, given the below freezing water temperature, that Daniel simply climbed into one of the early lifeboats being launched from the starboard side of the stricken liner. At that point, few passengers thought the ship would actually sink and many were reluctant to board the lifeboats. As a result, seats in the lifeboats found few takers, and some left the ship less than half full. Some men were allowed into lifeboats filled with women and children, ostensibly to man the oars.

Daniel himself never said which lifeboat he was rescued in, if he even knew. It may be that he was in more than one lifeboat between the time the ship sank and the arrival of the RMS Carpathia, which could account for the confusion. It is possible that Daniel jumped from the sinking ship and found refuge on one of the collapsible lifeboats and was later transferred into another lifeboat such as lifeboat 4, which rescued five survivors directly from the sea after the sinking. When lifeboat 4 was lowered from Titanic, it had approximately 30 people aboard; by the end of the night, however, it had perhaps around 60 people aboard, most of whom were transferred into it from other boats. The Sinking of the Titanic quotes Charles Lightoller, who survived by clinging to overturned collapsible lifeboat B, as saying that after the sinking Daniel was rescued from the water by "a passing lifeboat" which would have been Lifeboat No. 14.

According to Daniel's family lore, he was rescued by the "Unsinkable Molly Brown" (activist and philanthropist Margaret Tobin Brown of Denver) in Lifeboat 6, but there is no record of him being in that boat. A news article published in 1915 stated that Daniel was picked up by the lifeboat containing the woman who is now his wife. Mrs. Smith, whom he later married, is known to have been rescued in lifeboat 6.

While aboard the rescue ship, RMS Carpathia, Daniel met a fellow Titanic survivor, Eloise Hughes Smith, daughter of U.S. Representative James A. Hughes, whose husband, Lucian P. Smith, had died during the disaster. Daniel and Mrs. Smith were wed in a quiet ceremony in New York City in August 1914, but Daniel soon left for London on business and became stranded in England for two months when World War I broke out in Europe. Upon his return, they settled in a stately home in Philadelphia's fashionable Rosemont neighborhood, and Daniel became stepfather to her son Lucian Jr., who was born eight months after the sinking. After American entry into World War I, Daniel received an officer's commission in the U.S. Army and was sent to France. He rose to the rank of Major. Daniel returned home from Europe aboard the Cunard liner Mauretania then serving as a troopship to transport American soldiers home from the war. By the time the war ended, the couple had separated.

After the sinking Daniel submitted a claim to White Star for an estimated $4,583.25 in personal effects that he lost aboard the Titanic including 15 Meerschaum pipes that he’d purchased as gifts for friends and one champion French bulldog named Gamin de Pycombe.

In contrast to his willingness to speak to reporters immediately after the sinking in 1912, in later years Daniel refused to talk about the Titanic disaster. This could have been due to the traumatic nature of the event, or the stigma that many surviving male passengers felt as survivors of a tragedy that had claimed the lives of so many women and children. It is also possible that the fantastic account of his survival that he gave reporters as a young man was a tall tale and that Daniel, by then a prominent Virginia politician, did not want to answer questions. In a 1993 article by Daniel's granddaughter, she said that "he never talked about the Titanic disaster because, after all, he was a man, 28 years old, a very athletic and healthy man who survived, and the whole thing about women and children first was a stigma. So he never talked about it."

== Bank executive, gentleman farmer and subsequent marriages ==
Daniel was later named vice president of Liberty National Bank in New York City and later became president and chairman of the board. After learning that Daniel was spending time with another woman in New York, his estranged wife, Eloise, asked for and was granted a divorce from him in March 1923, citing an "unknown blonde woman" in her claim. On December 6, 1923, Daniel married Mrs. Edwin Rutheven Campbell (née Margery Pitt Durant; 1887-1969), daughter of William C. Durant, an automobile manufacturer who founded General Motors, in the Halsey Street Methodist Episcopal Church in Newark, New Jersey. This marriage produced one daughter, Margery Randolph Daniel (November 2, 1924 – May 23, 2013). The Daniels purchased Brandon, one of the James River Plantations in Prince George County, Virginia, in 1926, and restored the 18th century mansion. The couple divorced in September 1928, but Daniel kept the historic estate where he operated a dairy farm, maintained a stable of horses, and enjoyed hunting and shooting.

Daniel ascribed his second divorce to a charm which he had unintentionally broken at the old estate. According to a Harrison family legend, a bride of long ago who was married beneath the chandelier in the stately main room of the mansion died on her wedding night. Her wedding ring was embedded in the plaster ceiling and the legend was created that whoever disturbed it would meet with bad luck in love. After purchasing Brandon in 1926, Daniel ordered renovations made to the dilapidated 160-year-old mansion. While workmen were repairing the ceiling a piece of plaster fell to the floor containing a wedding ring. The workmen took it to Daniel, who had it cleaned and polished and placed back beneath the chandelier. He said he was aware of the legend and feared the results of disturbing the ring. Two years later Margery sued for divorce.

On October 10, 1929, Daniel married, for the third and final time, his distant cousin, Mrs. Frank Palmer Christian (née Charlotte Randolph Bemiss; 1890-1968) of Richmond, Virginia. At this time Daniel was president of Liberty National Bank in New York City. Mrs. Christian's first husband had died in 1918 during military service. Later, Daniel became chairman of the board of the Richmond Trust Company headquartered at 627 E. Main Street in Richmond. Their son, Robert Williams Daniel, Jr. was born in Richmond in March 1936.

Daniel was a longtime parishioner of the Martin's Brandon Episcopal Church and donated several stained glass windows by Tiffany. He reputedly asked the church vestry to never play the hymn "Nearer, My God, to Thee" during services. The hymn is often cited as the last song played by the Titanic's band as the ship sank.

== Political career ==
In 1935, Daniel was elected to the Senate of Virginia representing the 6th District, a part-time position. Daniel, a Conservative Democrat, was a political ally of Harry Flood Byrd and a close friend of his brother Rear Admiral Richard E. Byrd. He held the seat until his death.

Daniel served on the Governor's Advisory Board on the Budget and for ten years (appointed by three governors, Pollard, Peery and Price) and served on the State Board of Education until he resigned in 1937 to run for lieutenant governor. He later (in 1939) was appointed to the University of Virginia's Board of Visitors by Governor Price.

== Death and burial ==
The Wall Street Crash of 1929 and the Panic of 1930 led to numerous bank failures in the U.S. and the Richmond Trust Company closed in 1931 during the Great Depression and Daniel retired to his estate, Brandon, and became a gentleman farmer and entered Virginia politics. Although successful professionally and politically Daniel privately struggled with alcoholism, failed marriages, post-traumatic stress and the stigma associated with having survived the Titanic disaster for much of his life. He died of cirrhosis of the liver on December 20, 1940, in Richmond and was interred in Hollywood Cemetery in Richmond. Daniel's first wife and fellow Titanic Survivor, Eloise Smith, had died earlier the same year at the age of 46 in a sanitarium in Cincinnati.

Daniel's son and namesake would later serve five terms in the United States Congress.

Senate of Virginia
| Preceded by W. O. Rogers | Virginia Senate, District 6; 1936 - 1940 | Succeeded by Garland Gray |
