= Samuel Fitzhugh =

American politician

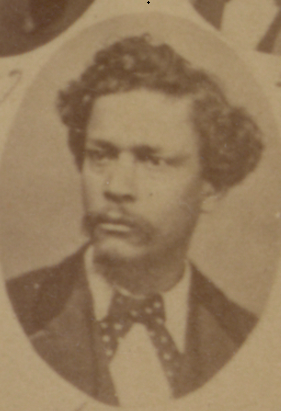
- Fitzhugh in 1874

Member of the Mississippi House of Representatives
- In office 1874–1876

Personal details
- Born: Samuel W. Fitzhugh c. 1844 Mississippi, U.S.
- Party: Republican
- Spouse: Delia Anna
- Children: 2
- Profession: Politician, educator

Samuel W. Fitzhugh was an American politician. He was a state legislator representing Wilkinson County, Mississippi in the Mississippi House of Representatives from 1874 to 1876.

The Vicksburg Daily Times referred to him as the "cider colored negro" and a "colleague of the tallow-faced Gubbs" in a blurb deriding African American Republicans. He was one of the legislator signatories of a letter explaining their opposition to a convict labor bill.

== See also ==
- African American officeholders from the end of the Civil War until before 1900
