= Hatch Archeological Site =

Archaeological site in Virginia, United States

- U.S. National Register of Historic Places
- Virginia Landmarks Register
- Nearest city: Hopewell, Virginia
- Area: 15 acres (6.1 ha)
- NRHP reference No.: 89001923
- VLR No.: 074-0047

Significant dates
- Added to NRHP: November 6, 1989
- Designated VLR: February 21, 1989

Hatch Archeological Site, also known as Weyanoke Old Town, is a historic archaeological site located near Hopewell, Prince George County, Virginia. The site includes sherds of "zoned pottery," discovered in excavations conducted under Leverette "Lefty" Gregory from 1975 to 1989. The term "zoned" is used to describe the incised decoration found on the exterior of this particular pottery type.

It was listed on the National Register of Historic Places in 1989.
