= Fitzhugh, Virginia =

Unincorporated community in Virginia, United States

Coordinates: 36.66570°N 77.76415°W

Fitzhugh is an unincorporated community located in Brunswick County, in the U.S. state of Virginia.
