= Disputanta, Kentucky =

Unincorporated community in Kentucky, United States

Disputanta
- Unincorporated community
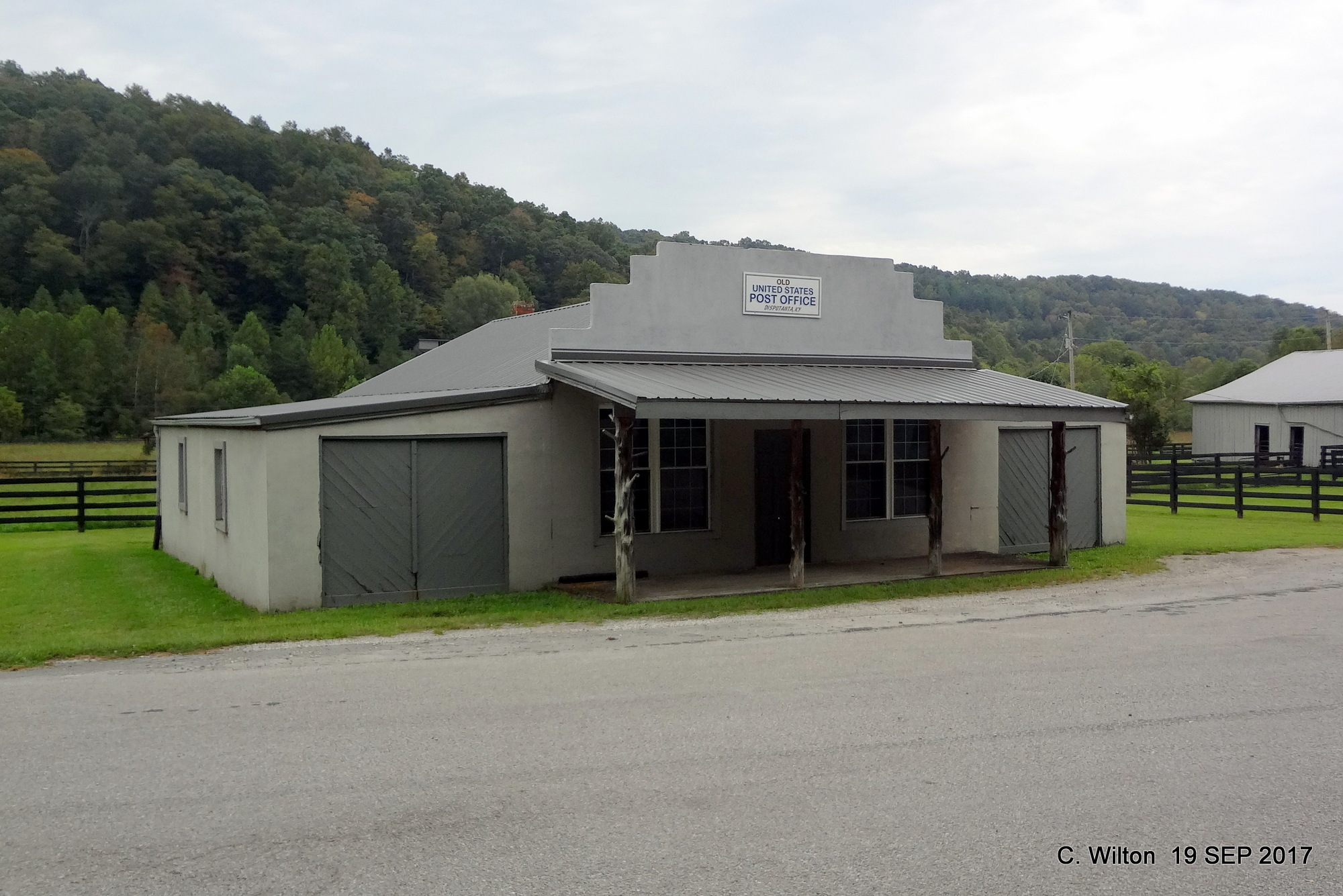
- The old Post Office in Disputanta, Kentucky
- Nickname: Clear Creek
- Location within the state of Kentucky Disputanta (the United States)
- Coordinates: 37°29′18″N 84°15′27″W
- Country: United States
- State: Kentucky
- County: Rockcastle
- Elevation: 1,020 ft (310 m)
- Time zone: UTC-5 (Eastern (EST))
  - Summer (DST): UTC-4 (EDT)
- ZIP codes: 40456
- Area code: 606
- GNIS feature ID: 511822

Disputanta is an unincorporated community located in Rockcastle County, Kentucky, United States. It is located on Kentucky Route 1787.

The name Disputanta is said to have arisen from a dispute over the name of the new defunct post office. Many residents of the area refer to the area by Clear Creek.

Anglin Falls, a trail that is a part of the John B. Stephenson Memorial Forest, is a common attraction for hikers as it boasts a 75-foot tall waterfall.
