= Upper Brandon Plantation =

Historic plantation in Prince George County, Virginia

Coordinates: 37.2816°N 77.0188°W

Upper Brandon Plantation is an historic plantation in Prince George County, Virginia on the James River. It was listed as a Virginia Historic Landmark in 1996.

== History ==
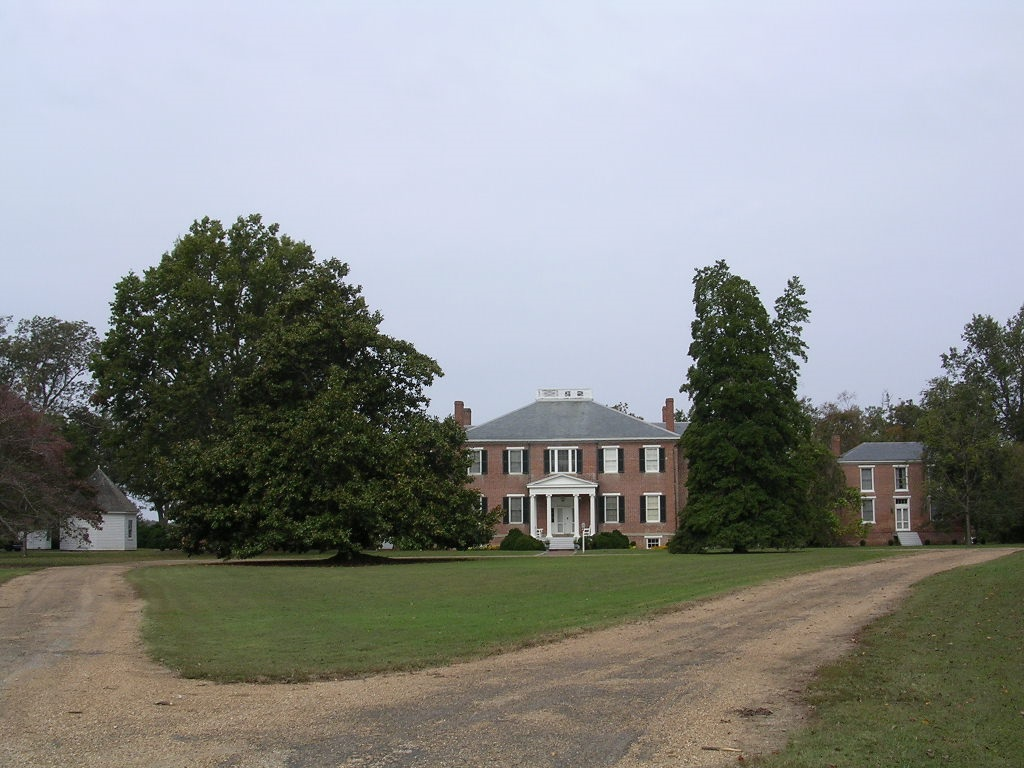
Upper Brandon Plantation, 2003

Upper Brandon plantation was part of a 1616 original land patent of 5,000 acres granted to Captain John Martin, one of the founders of Jamestown. Richard Quiney, the brother of the son-in-law of William Shakespeare, purchased the property from Martin's grandson and shared ownership with John Sadler (and possibly with William Barker).1 For almost 100 years, these men or their heirs were absentee owners who bought an additional 2,000 acres. Benjamin Harrison II of Berkeley purchased the land prior to his death in 1712.

Harrison's son Nathaniel (1677-1727) inherited the acreage and passed it to his son Col. Nathaniel Harrison II (1703-1791), who built the mansion at Brandon Plantation in 1765. His son, Benjamin Harrison III (1743-1807), named after his great uncle of the same name, left a will that divided the 7,000 acre property between his two sons, George Evelyn Harrison (1797-1839) and William Byrd Harrison (1800-1870), who were to receive their inheritance when they reached the age of twenty-one. When he came of age, George Evelyn Harrison received the original Brandon house and divided the land with his brother. County tax records show that in 1824 Brandon had 93 slaves and Upper Brandon had 94.

William Byrd Harrison, an 1820 graduate of Harvard University inherited the property now known as Upper Brandon and completed the main building and its two dependencies in 1825. Two wings were added to the main structure in 1859. The main house at Upper Brandon is a five-bay center hall, red brick structure built in the Federal style with a low hip roof with a widows walk.

The design of the mansion and its woodwork was influenced by The American Builder's Companion by Asher Benjamin. Due to similarities in construction, it is believed that the itinerant craftsmen involved in its construction may be responsible for several other equally important contemporary Virginia houses including Magnolia Grange, in Chesterfield County.; Hampstead, in New Kent County; Horn Quarter, King William County.; the Governor's Mansion in Richmond; and 19th-century alterations to the 18th-century mansion at Brandon.

The house is a large Tidewater rectangular dwelling with a center hall and four corner rooms (20' X 20') repeated in the basement and on the second floor with approximately 3,756 square feet on each floor. The seven-foot-tall, third-floor attic, with access to the widow's walk, was never finished. This five-part Palladian form was well established among the grander Virginia plantations. The two smaller three-bay dependencies had similar configurations at either end of the main structure, connected by low hyphens that are partially below grade. with the kitchen and laundry in the west building to allow passage of food to the main house. The east dependency is thought to have been a school or office and access through the east hyphen was never completed. The brickwork is a Flemish bond, and the roof is slate; smaller bricks were used to construct the dependencies. Classical porches complete the two facades using Composite order columns on the northwest front river entrance and Ionic order columns on the southeast land entrance.

William Byrd Harrison and his family lived there until the outbreak of the Civil War. After the Civil War, William Byrd Harrison never returned to live at Upper Brandon and upon his death in 1870, the plantation was purchased by his nephew, George Harrison Byrd. Byrd's son Francis Otway Byrd, the last Harrison descendant to live at Upper Brandon inherited the plantation in 1909. He sold the estate to Hopewell businessman Harry Clarke Thompson and his wife, Frances Hargroves Thompson in 1948. Thompson later acquired the adjoining Dunmore and Edloe properties.

In 1950, they asked their son-in-law, Henning Frederick Robertson, to take over operation of the farm and dairy. Following the death of Harry Thompson, the 1800 acre property was sold to Fred E. Watkins of Curles Neck Farms in 1961, and the Dunmore and Edloe farm properties were left to the Thompson's two daughters. Robertson and his family continued to manage the farm for Watkins and live in the main house until 1969. Watkins used the farmland at Upper Brandon to grow feed for his cows at Curles Neck Dairy. The manor house was unoccupied from 1969 until 1984 when the property was purchased by the James River Corporation. They restored the mansion and used the property as a conference center and corporate retreat. James River Corporation later acquired the adjoining Edloe property from Frederick and Legare Thompson Robertson.

== Modern history ==
Upper Brandon was purchased in 2012 by the James C. Justice Companies, which is currently owned and operated by the Justice family, headed by patriarch Jim Justice. The family owns The Greenbrier Resort and has extensive farming and mining operations in West Virginia, Virginia, Kentucky, North Carolina, and South Carolina including 50,000 acres (200 km2) that it farms through its Justice Farms of North Carolina operations headquartered in Roanoke, Virginia.

The Upper Brandon property is protected through a conservation easement held by the American Farmland Trust.
