= Fitzhugh Green Jr. =

American businessman

Fitzhugh Green Jr. (September 12, 1917 – September 5, 1990) was an executive with Vicks Chemical Company and then with Life magazine. In 1954, he was the deputy vice-chairman for the National Citizens for Eisenhower/Nixon Congressional Committee.

== Biography ==
Fitzhugh Green Jr. was born in Jenkintown, Pennsylvania, United States, on September 12, 1917, to Fitzhugh Green Sr. and Natalie Wheeler Elliot. Green attended the Beaseley School in Cooperstown, New York, and the St. Paul's School where he graduated in 1936. He completed his first year of Princeton University in 1940 but was forced to leave when his vision degenerated. In 1940 he entered the United States National Guard where he received an honorable discharge due to his worsening medical condition, and was allowed to join the United States Naval Reserve.

Green worked at the United States Information Agency from 1954 until 1966. In 1966 he took a two-year sabbatical to work as a special assistant on oceanography and foreign affairs for Senator Claiborne Pell. Returning to USIA in 1968, Green served as deputy director for Far East operations. He resigned from USIA in 1970 and ran unsuccessfully for the Republican nomination for a Congressional seat from Rhode Island. Green returned to government service as associate administrator of the Environmental Protection Agency from 1971 to 1977 and 1983–1987. On retirement from the EPA, Green joined the private enterprise of William D. Ruckelshaus Associates as vice president of international operations.

Fitzhugh Green Jr. died on September 5, 1990, of cardiac arrhythmia.

== Publications ==
External videos
- Booknotes interview with Green on George Bush: An Intimate Portrait, January 21, 1990, C-SPAN

- A Change in the Weather:
- American Propaganda Abroad (Hippocrene Books, 1988; ISBN 978-0870525780)
- George Bush: An Intimate Portrait : (Hippocrene Books, 1989; ISBN 978-0870527838)
