= Lower Brandon Plantation =

Historic house in Virginia, United States

- Brandon
- U.S. National Register of Historic Places
- U.S. National Historic Landmark
- Virginia Landmarks Register
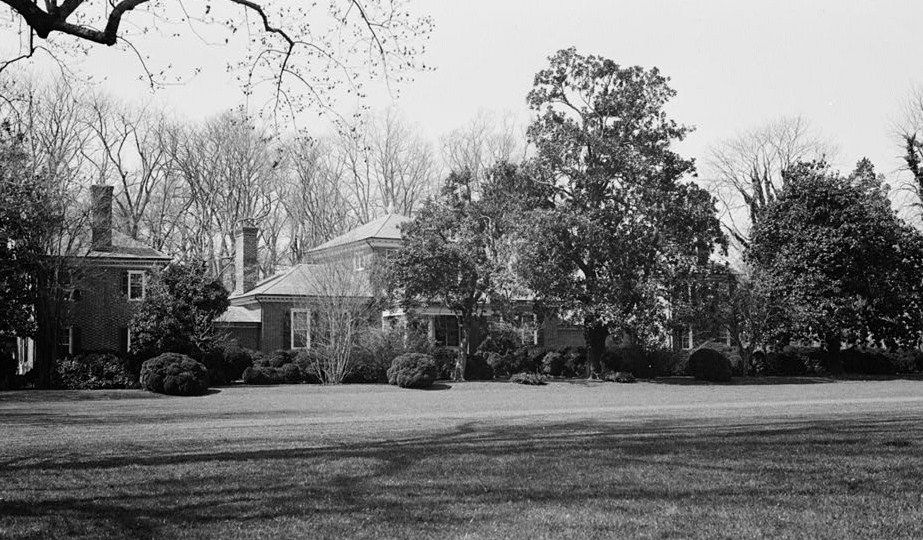
- Brandon

- Location within Virginia Location within the United States
- Location: Burrowsville, Prince George County, Virginia
- Coordinates: 37°15′27.1″N 76°59′36.2″W
- Built: c. 1765
- Architect: unknown
- Architectural style: English Palladian
- NRHP reference No.: 69000271
- VLR No.: 074-0002

Significant dates
- Added to NRHP: November 11, 1969
- Designated NHL: April 15, 1970
- Designated VLR: September 9, 1969, December 5, 2007

Lower Brandon Plantation (or simply Brandon or Brandon Plantation and initially known as Martin's Brandon) is located on the south shore of the James River in present-day Prince George County, Virginia.

The plantation is an active farm and was tended perhaps from 1607 on, and more clearly from 1614 on, making it one of the longest-running agricultural enterprises in the United States. It has an unusual brick mansion in the style of Palladio's "Roman Country House" completed in the 1760s, and was perhaps designed by Thomas Jefferson.

The Virginia plantation was established in 1616 by Captain John Martin, one of the original leaders of the Virginia Colony at Jamestown in 1607. The plantation was owned by the Harrison family for over two centuries, from 1700–1926. Restored by Robert Williams Daniel in the early 20th century, it is a National Historical Landmark.

== History ==
Brandon Plantation was part of a 1616 land grant of approximately 7,000 acres (28 km^{2}) on the south bank of the James River to Captain John Martin (1560–1632). Captain Martin was one of the original colonists and a member of the first Council in the spring of 1607, when Jamestown was established.

Martin's new plantation built on the 1616 land grant was initially named "Martin's Brandon", apparently incorporating the family name of his wife, Mary Martin (née Brandon), daughter of Robert Brandon, a prominent English goldsmith and supplier to Queen Elizabeth I of England. They married in 1586.

In 1619, Martin's Brandon was one of the plantations represented when what became the House of Burgesses, the first representative legislative body in the English colonies, met at Jamestown. The representatives of Martin's Brandon were Thomas Davis and Robert Stacy.

During the Indian massacre of 1622 which occurred on Good Friday, March 22, 1622, there were 7 deaths recorded at Martin's Brandon, including one woman and two boys. 347 deaths were recorded during the coordinated attacks along both shores of the James River, from the mouth of the river at Newport News Point on Hampton Roads, west to Falling Creek.

Captain John Martin died at Martin's Brandon Plantation in 1632. His grandson, Captain Robert Bargrave, inherited the plantation on Martin's death. In 1637, merchants John Sadler and Richard Quiney and mariner William Barker, who patented the nearby Merchant's Hope plantation, bought Martin's Brandon. They and their heirs farmed it until 1720 when it was sold to Nathaniel Harrison (1677–1727).

After Nathaniel's premature death in 1727, it passed to his son Nathaniel Harrison II (1703–1791) who built the current manor house around 1765. Brandon then came into the possession of American Revolutionary War Colonel Benjamin Harrison (1743–1807). At his death, the property was divided between his two sons, and Upper Brandon Plantation was created.

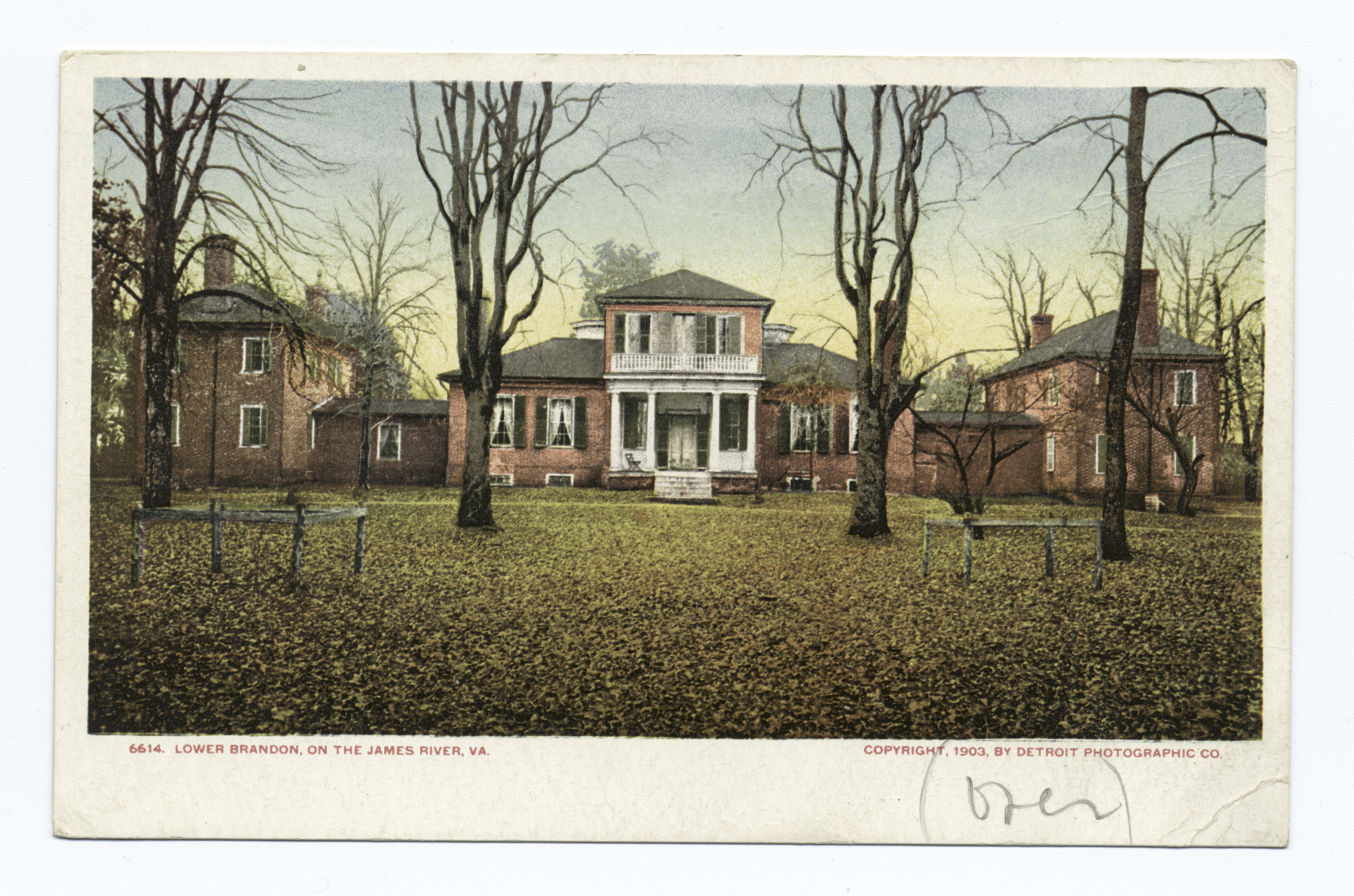
1898 postcard

In 1824 tax records show that Brandon had 93 slaves and Upper Brandon had 94.

Brandon Plantation (aka Lower Brandon) remained in the Harrison family until 1926, when it was acquired by Robert Williams Daniel, a Richmond banker. The Daniels undertook the restoration of the house and grounds and purchased several adjacent tracts of land that were part of the original land grant that had been separated from the estate over the previous three centuries. U.S. Congressman Robert W. Daniel, Jr. (1936–2012) inherited the property from his parents.

Brandon was listed on the National Register of Historic Places in 1969, and was further declared a U.S. National Historic Landmark in 1985.

The restored manor house was furnished by the Daniels with 1760s era English and American furnishings. Brandon is a working farm and the agricultural enterprise is one of the oldest continuous farming operations in the United States.

The 4,487.5-acre (1,816.0 ha) property was placed for sale in May 2013 and sold at auction by the estate of Robert W. Daniel, Jr., on June 23, 2013. In late 2013 the purchase contract with the buyer, a real estate developer, fell through and the estate was put back on the market with an asking price of $20 million. Midway through 2014, a Florida family purchased it for $17.8 million; the new owners announced their intention to continue the agricultural operation and to occupy the historic manor house for part of the year.

== See also ==
- Jeffersonian architecture
- Martin's Brandon Church
- List of National Historic Landmarks in Virginia
- National Register of Historic Places listings in Prince George County, Virginia
