= Disputanta, Virginia =

Disputanta
- Census-designated place
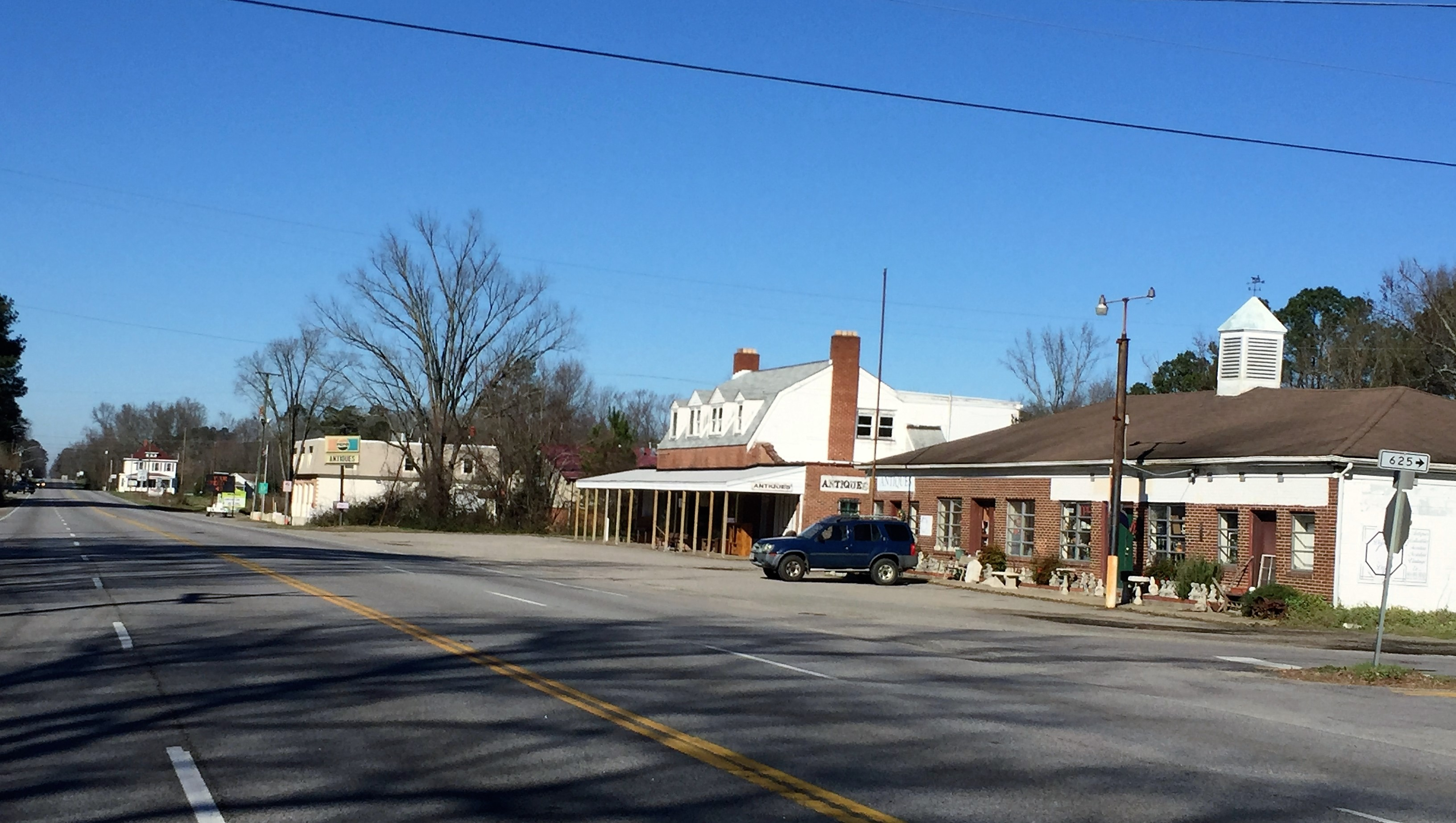
- Disputanta, along U.S. Route 460

- Location within the Commonwealth of Virginia Disputanta (the United States)
- Coordinates: 37°7′28″N 77°13′33″W
- Country: United States
- State: Virginia
- County: Prince George

Area
  - Total: 2.76 sq mi (7.14 km^{2})
- Elevation: 115 ft (35 m)

Population (2020)
  - Total: 373
  - Density: 135/sq mi (52.2/km^{2})
- Time zone: UTC−5 (Eastern (EST))
  - Summer (DST): UTC−4 (EDT)
- ZIP codes: 23842
- GNIS ID: 1492869

Disputanta is an unincorporated community and census-designated place in Prince George County, Virginia, United States in the Richmond-Petersburg region and is a portion of the Richmond Metropolitan Statistical Area (MSA). The postal ZIP Code of Disputanta is 23842. It was first listed as a CDP in the 2020 census with a population of 373.

== History ==
Popular legend has it that William Mahone (1826–1895), builder of the Norfolk and Petersburg Railroad (now part of the Norfolk Southern railway), and his cultured wife, Otelia Butler Mahone (1837–1911), traveled along the newly completed Norfolk and Petersburg Railroad naming stations. Otelia was reading Ivanhoe by Sir Walter Scott. From his historical Scottish novels, Otelia chose the place names of Windsor and Waverly. She tapped the Scottish Clan "McIvor" for the name of Ivor, a small town in neighboring Southampton County.

As they continued west, they reached a station just west of the Sussex County line in Prince George County where they could not agree on a suitable name from the books. Instead, they became creative, and according to the legend invented a new name in honor of their dispute.

The N&P railroad was completed in 1858. William Mahone later became a Major General in the Confederate Army during the Civil War, and was later elected to the United States Senate. A large portion of U.S. Highway 460 between Petersburg and Suffolk is named General Mahone Highway in his honor.

Disputanta was a thriving rail town for the first half of the twentieth century. It was an important stop for trains on the Norfolk and Western Railroad due to its two 50,000 gallon water tanks that supplied water for the boilers on steam locomotives. Disputanta once had several hundred residents, two schools, the Disputanta school for whites, and the Jack Cole School for Negroes; nine stores, three banks, two peanut warehouses, a saw mill, and various other businesses. In 1960, Norfolk and Western became the last major railroad in the United States to abandon steam locomotives for diesel-electric motive power. When Norfolk and Western replaced their last steam locomotives with modern diesel locomotives and ended passenger rail service, trains no longer stopped at Disputanta anymore and its population declined as rail workers left. Today the railroad depot and most of the businesses are long gone and the tiny community consists of approximately 75 homes, two churches, a fire station, a post office, a Dollar General store and an elementary school. A large Food Lion warehouse, an auto parts factory operated by Standard Motor Products, and a large truck stop are located just west of town along Highway 460 between Disputanta and New Bohemia.

In the late 19th century, over 700 Czech and Slovak families settled in Prince George and neighboring counties due to the availability of cheap farmland after the Civil War. Some came directly from their homelands in Eastern Europe, while others who had settled in Pennsylvania moved south to Virginia. Some who had homesteaded in the Midwest sold their claims and moved back east and bought farms in Prince George. The area is still very rural and descendants of these Czech and Slovak immigrants continue to live in the area and farm the land around Disputanta.

The historic Chester Plantation, located on U.S. Route 460 just west of Disputanta, and Cedar Ridge, located just east of Disputanta in Surry County, are listed on the National Register of Historic Places.

== Demographics ==
Historical population
Census	Pop.	Note	%±
2020	373		—
U.S. Decennial Census; 2000 2010

Disputanta first appeared as a census designated place in the 2020 U.S. census.

=== Racial and ethnic composition ===
Disputanta CDP, Virginia – Racial and ethnic composition Note: the US Census treats Hispanic/Latino as an ethnic category. This table excludes Latinos from the racial categories and assigns them to a separate category. Hispanics/Latinos may be of any race.
Race / Ethnicity (NH = Non-Hispanic)	Pop 2020	2020
White alone (NH)	232	62.20%
Black or African American alone (NH)	90	24.13%
Native American or Alaska Native alone (NH)	2	0.54%
Asian alone (NH)	2	0.54%
Native Hawaiian or Pacific Islander alone (NH)	0	0.00%
Other race alone (NH)	2	0.54%
Mixed race or Multiracial (NH)	22	5.90%
Hispanic or Latino (any race)	23	6.17%
Total	373	100.00%
