= James Pleasants =

American governor

James Pleasants Jr.
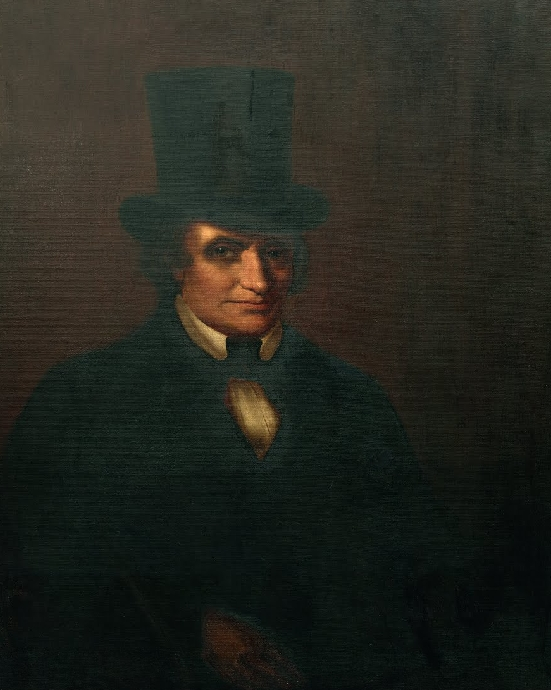

22nd Governor of Virginia
- In office December 1, 1822 – December 10, 1825
- Preceded by: Thomas M. Randolph, Jr.
- Succeeded by: John Tyler, Jr.

United States Senator from Virginia
- In office December 14, 1819 – December 15, 1822
- Preceded by: John W. Eppes
- Succeeded by: John Taylor

Member of the U.S. House of Representatives from Virginia's 17th district
- In office March 4, 1813 – December 14, 1819
- Preceded by: Thomas Gholson, Jr.
- Succeeded by: William S. Archer

Member of the U.S. House of Representatives from Virginia's 16th district
- In office March 4, 1811 – March 3, 1813
- Preceded by: John W. Eppes
- Succeeded by: John W. Eppes

7th Clerk of the Virginia House of Delegates
- In office December 6, 1802 – March 4, 1811
- Preceded by: William Wirt
- Succeeded by: William Munford

Member of the Virginia House of Delegates from Goochland County
- In office December 1797 – December 6, 1802
- Preceded by: John Guerrant Jr.
- Succeeded by: James Carter

Personal details
- Born: October 24, 1769 Cold Comfort, Goochland County (now Powhatan County), Colony of Virginia, British America
- Died: November 9, 1836 (aged 67) Contention, Goochland County, Virginia, U.S.
- Party: Democratic-Republican
- Spouse: Susanna Lawson Rose
- Children: John Hampden Pleasants
- Education: College of William & Mary
- Profession: Lawyer, politician

James Pleasants Jr. (October 24, 1769 – November 9, 1836) was an American politician who served in the U.S. Senate from 1819 to 1822 and was the 22nd governor of Virginia from 1822 to 1825.

== Early and family life ==
Pleasants was born in Goochland County (later separated as Powhatan County) in the Colony of Virginia on October 24, 1769. He pursued classical studies and graduated from the College of William and Mary, Williamsburg, Virginia. He later read law under the guidance of Judge Fleming.

Pleasants was the son of prominent Quaker James Cocke Pleasants and his wife Ann Randolph, the daughter of Isham Randolph of Dungeness and granddaughter of William Randolph. He had a sister, Susan.

== Career ==
After admission to the Virginia bar, Pleasants began his legal practice in Amelia County, Virginia in 1791.

Goochland County voters elected Pleasants to represent them in the Virginia House of Delegates beginning in 1797 (to succeed to the seat vacated by John Guerrant Jr. whom legislators had elected to the Council of State). Although the initial victor of that contest appeared to be Smith Payne, a court determined Pleasants won, and he was re-elected many times to that part-time position. He was a Democratic Republican aligned with Thomas Jefferson and supported the declarations of 1798–90. However, in the turbulent politics of that era, voters repeatedly refused to re-elect his fellow delegate, so Pleasants served alongside Thomas Miller, Heath Jones Miller, William Lee, James Carter and his initial rival, Smith Payne. Beginning in 1802, Pleasants served as clerk of the House of Delegates (1802–1811). According to one source, Pleasants resigned upon being elected to Congress as discussed below. On January 30, 1811, he was appointed to the Court of Appeals but resigned almost immediately. William Munford succeeded him as Clerk of the House of Delegates.

In 1810, Pleasants successfully ran for Congress as a Democratic-Republican to the Twelfth and the four succeeding Congresses. He served from March 4, 1811, to December 14, 1819, when he resigned, having been elected a United States Senator. Pleasants served as chairman of the Committee on Public Expenditures (Thirteenth Congress), Committee on Expenditures in the Department of the Navy (Fifteenth Congress).

He was elected on December 10, 1819, as a Democratic-Republican to the United States Senate to fill the vacancy caused by the resignation of John W. Eppes and served from December 14, 1819, to December 15, 1822, when he resigned. He was chair of the Naval Affairs Committee (Sixteenth and Seventeenth Congresses). He was chosen as Governor of Virginia, serving 1822–1825. Pleasants was a delegate to the State constitutional conventions in 1829 and 1830. He retired and lived on his estate, "Contention," near Goochland, Goochland County, Virginia.

== Slavery ==
By the time this man's grandfather, John Pleasants III (a prominent Quaker merchant and member of the Curles Neck meeting) died in 1771 (when this man was an infant), Quakers reformers had come to oppose slavery, believing that ownership of other individuals was contrary to their belief in the religious equality of all persons. This boy's uncle, Robert Pleasants (1723–1801), influenced his father to write a will manumitting all his slaves (some 200 at the time) as well as naming Robert as executor of the estate. However, freeing slaves was illegal under colonial law, and only became legal in Virginia in 1782. Another uncle, Jonathan Pleasants, who died in 1776, wrote a similar will, and also named Robert Pleasants as executor. Robert Pleasants freed the enslaved allocated to him when that became legal, and in his own will provided for them with a church and 350 acre tract called Gravely Hills in Henrico County. For years he tried to convince other relatives to do the same, but other family members (who continued to own slaves) objected. For example, John Pleasants' widow, the former Miriam Hunnicutt, freed three slaves and seemed to free another named James, but never filed the required paperwork at the courthouse, and her sons later kidnapped and re-enslaved him with her approval. Furthermore, Jonathan's sister Mary (Molly) Pleasants married Charles Logan in Philadelphia and both signed a written promise to free the 50 slaves allotted her in Jonathan's will, but then moved to Powhatan County and reneged, and after Logan died, Molly married her cousin Robert Cary Pleasants, who claimed 160 slaves under the wills by 1799. Robert Pleasants' former ward, Samuel Pleasants Jr. left the Quaker meeting rather than free the scores of slaves allocated to him (which had increased to 189 by 1799), and his own son Robert Jr.'s wife (and soon widow) Eliza (daughter of Thomas Mann Randolph wrote her father in law arguing that the Golden Rule justified continued enslavement of black people. Robert Pleasants' sister Elizabeth Langley also refused to emancipate the slaves she had received, as did the non-Quaker husbands of her three daughters. Robert Pleasants tried suasion as well as filed many legislative petitions. Finally, in 1797 he hired future U.S. Supreme Court justice John Marshall to try to enforce the manumission provisions in both wills in Virginia's High Court of Chancery. The result was a lawsuit against Cary Pleasants and other family members. The 1798 decision by Chancellor George Wythe in Pleasants v Pleasants, was appealed by Pleasants kin represented by prominent lawyers Edmund Randolph and John Wickham. Ultimately, in 1799 Judge Wythe's decision was affirmed by Edmund Pendleton, Spencer Roane and George Carrington, all writing separately but together constituting the Virginia Court of Appeals (a predecessor of today's Virginia Supreme Court), but on much narrower grounds.

This James Pleasants was not a lawyer directly involved in that legal case, though it may have contributed to his naming of his Goochland plantation. Federal census records confirm he enslaved 17 people in Goochland County in 1810, 18 people in Goochland County in 1820 and 16 people in Goochland County in 1830.

== Death and legacy ==
Pleasants died at Contention on November 9, 1836. He was buried on his estate. His brother-in-law and law partner, Eugene C. Massie, named his son James Pleasants Massie after Pleasants. The name has been handed down now to a total of four generations.

His son John Hampden Pleasants (1797–1846) founded the Richmond Whig newspaper, married twice, and later died in a duel with Thomas Ritchie, Jr.

Pleasants is the namesake of a residence hall at William and Mary. Pleasants County, West Virginia, was named after him in 1851.

U.S. House of Representatives
Preceded by John W. Eppes	Member of the U.S. House of Representatives from Virginia's 16th congressional district March 4, 1811 – March 4, 1813	Succeeded by John W. Eppes
Preceded by Thomas Gholson, Jr.	Member of the U.S. House of Representatives from Virginia's 17th congressional district March 4, 1813 – December 14, 1819	Succeeded by William S. Archer
U.S. Senate
Preceded by John W. Eppes	U.S. senator (Class 2) from Virginia; December 14, 1819 – December 15, 1822; Served alongside: James Barbour	Succeeded by John Taylor
Political offices
Preceded by Thomas M. Randolph	Governor of Virginia; December 1, 1822 – December 10, 1825	Succeeded by John Tyler, Jr.
