= Appomattox River =

Tributary of the James River in Virginia, United States

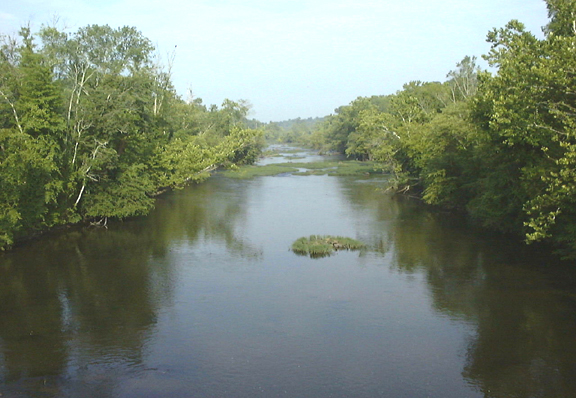
- The Appomattox River at Matoaca, Virginia

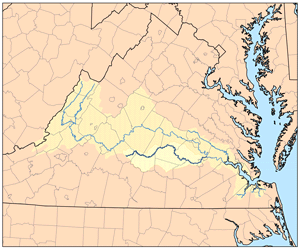
- Map of the James River watershed with the Appomattox River watershed highlighted light yellow; the Appomattox River is shown in dark blue

Location
- Country: United States
- State: Virginia
- Cities: Petersburg, Tri-cities

Physical characteristics
- Source
  - location: Appomattox, Virginia
  - coordinates: 37°23′46″N 78°49′44″W
  - elevation: 820 ft (250 m)
- Mouth: James River
  - location: Hopewell, Virginia
  - coordinates: 37°19′15″N 77°16′32″W
  - elevation: 0 ft (0 m)
- Length: 157 mi (253 km)
- Basin size: 1,344 sq mi (3,480 km^{2})
- Discharge
  - location: Matoaca
  - average: 1,366 cu ft/s (38.7 m^{3}/s)
  - minimum: 18 cu ft/s (0.51 m^{3}/s)
  - maximum: 39,400 cu ft/s (1,120 m^{3}/s)

The Appomattox River is a tributary of the James River, about 157 miles (253 km) long, in central and eastern Virginia, named for the Appomattocs Indian tribe who lived along its lower banks in the 17th century. It drains a cotton and tobacco-growing region of the Piedmont and coastal plain southwest of Richmond.

== Course ==
The Appomattox River rises in a field near State Route 656 (Horseshoe Road) in the Piedmont of northeastern Appomattox County, about 3 miles (4.8 km) northeast of the town of Appomattox. It flows generally southeast through the Appomattox-Buckingham State Forest to Farmville. Then it flows in a large arc northeast then southeast across the coastal plain, passing southwest of Richmond and passing through the Lake Chesdin reservoir. It flows through Petersburg, its head of navigation, through the Tri-cities area, then, at City Point in Hopewell, joins the James River from the west.

== History ==
The English colonists in Virginia tried to rename the Appomattox the "Bristoll River", but the name did not catch on. Historical spelling variants include Apamatuck, Apamutiky, Appamattuck, Appomattake, and Apumetecs.

The Appomattox River was cleared for transportation from Farmville to Petersburg for batteaux from 1745 to 1890 as the Upper Appomattox Canal Navigation System. Eppington Plantation had docks for larger boats that could carry seven tons to Petersburg in a four-day round trip. Petersburg had a port below the fall line that could hold ships which carry 200 tons down river to the Atlantic Ocean. Port Walthall, six miles downstream could hold larger ships and at City Point, where the Appomattox ran into the James River, even larger ships could dock in the 19th century.

In April 1865, during the Appomattox campaign of the American Civil War, the Confederate forces attempted to burn the High Bridge over the river northwest of Burkeville to escape the pursuing Union Army after the fall of Petersburg. The Union capture of the bridge was a contributing factor in the forcing of General Robert E. Lee's surrender at nearby Appomattox Court House, ending the war in Virginia.

== Recreation ==
The river is a popular destination for rafting and canoeing, particularly downstream of the small Abutment Dam (which is a couple miles down stream of Chesdin Dam) in the village of Matoaca to Petersburg near Virginia State University.

== See also ==
- List of Virginia rivers
