= John Hampden Pleasants =

American journalist (1797–1846)

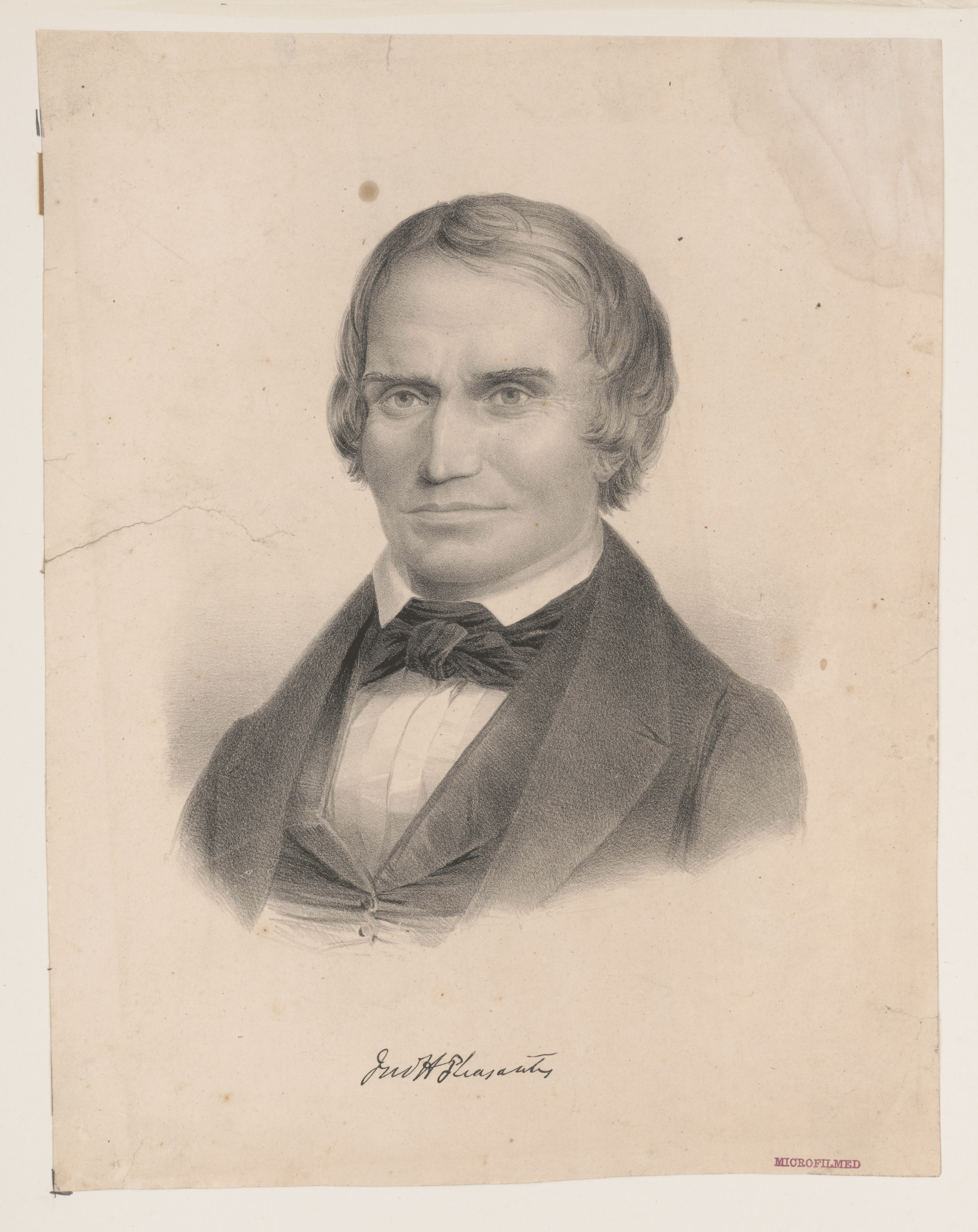
- Born: January 4, 1797; Goochland County, Virginia
- Died: March 1, 1846 (aged 49); Virginia
- Occupations: Journalist, businessman
- Spouses: Ann Elizabeth Irvine (m. 1818; died 1819); Mary Massie (m. 1829)
- Children: 1 (with Mary Massie)
- Parents: James Pleasants (father); Susanna Lawson Rose (mother)

John Hampden Pleasants (January 4, 1797 – March 1, 1846) was an American journalist and businessman. He is known as the editor and founder of the Richmond Whig, a daily newspaper that was later active during the Civil War. Pleasants died on March 1, 1846, after participating in a duel with Thomas Ritchie, who was the editor of a rival newspaper, the Richmond Enquirer.

== Biography ==
Pleasants was born on January 4, 1797, in Goochland County, Virginia, to James and Susanna Lawson Rose Pleasants. He studied at the College of William and Mary for one session, after which point he began studying law. While Pleasants was able to open his own practice, his fear of public speaking and lack of conversational skills kept him from succeeding in the profession. In 1820 Pleasants purchased interest in the Lynchburg Press and began serving as an editor. Four years later he founded the Richmond Whig.

Pleasants married his cousin Ann Elizabeth Irvine in the spring of 1818, but their marriage was short lived as she died after only a year of marriage. This marriage produced no children. Ten years later in 1829 Pleasants married Mary Massie, with whom he had one child.

== Richmond Whig and duel with Ritchie ==
The newspaper served the Whig Party and during its run was one of the four major newspapers in the city of Richmond, Virginia. Like many newspapers during the Civil War, the Richmond Whig published viewpoints and news on the institution of slavery and some of these viewpoints put Pleasants at odds with Thomas Ritchie, who edited the rival newspaper the Richmond Enquirer. The arguments between the two men were known to grow so fierce that they used their own newspapers as an avenue for heated discussions and journalists from other newspapers as far as Philadelphia would occasionally take part in their debates. Neither man was opposed to the emancipation of slaves, although Ritchie favored a slower emancipation process than Pleasants.

Eventually the contempt between the two men grew to the point where Ritchie called Pleasants an abolitionist and a coward. While Pleasants did lobby for the freeing of slaves he took issue with being called an abolitionist, a term that was seen as an insult in slaveholding states. As a result, Pleasants challenged Ritchie to a duel and the two men met on February 25, 1846, in Manchester, Virginia.

Accounts of the duel differ slightly. Some allege that Pleasants had loaded his pistol with blanks, as he had only wanted to frighten his opponent, while others state that he fired into the air. During the duel the two men initially shot at one another but later moved to swords. Ritchie managed to stab Pleasants in the abdomen with a sword. Pleasants died two days later. Ritchie was tried for the crime but was acquitted. Despite his early vehemence towards the other man, Ritchie was greatly remorseful for his actions and later left Pleasants's daughter a large sum of money in his will.
