= Mary Jefferson Eppes =

Thomas Jefferson's younger child

- Born: Mary Jefferson; August 1, 1778; Monticello, Virginia, U.S.
- Died: April 17, 1804 (aged 25); Monticello, Virginia, U.S.
- Spouse: John Wayles Eppes (m. 1797)
- Children: Unnamed Daughter; Francis; Maria
- Parents: Thomas Jefferson (father); Martha Wayles Skelton (mother)

Mary Jefferson Eppes (August 1, 1778 – April 17, 1804), known as Polly in childhood and Maria as an adult, was the younger of Thomas Jefferson's two daughters with his wife who survived beyond the age of 3. She married a first cousin, John Wayles Eppes, and had three children with him. Only their son Francis W. Eppes survived childhood. Maria died months after childbirth.

== Early life and education ==
Mary "Polly" Jefferson was born to Thomas Jefferson and Martha Jefferson (née Wayles) in 1778. (Note: Her mother, Martha Jefferson, was previously married to Bathurst Skelton, who died on September 30, 1768. They had a son, John, but he died almost three years after his father, on June 10, 1771, the summer before she married Thomas Jefferson.) She was their fourth child, but only one of two children who made it to adulthood. Their first child, Martha "Patsy" Jefferson, was born in 1772. By the time Polly was born, Jane (1774–1775) and a son who lived for only a few weeks in 1777 were both dead.

Her father was elected the governor of Virginia on June 1, 1779, and the family first moved to Williamsburg. The government relocated to Richmond in 1780 and the family moved there. British troops advanced to Richmond in May 1781 and, due to advance warning, the Jeffersons escaped to their country home, Poplar Forest. During this time, Martha and Thomas's fifth child, Lucy Elizabeth (1780–1781) had died. Then, the second Lucy Elizabeth was born on May 8, 1782. Martha had not seemed to recover during the four months following Lucy's birth and died on September 6, 1782. Polly was four years old. Thomas was bereft in grief. The monument that he had created for her contained the words "Torn from him by death / September 6th, 1782: / This monument of his love is inscribed."

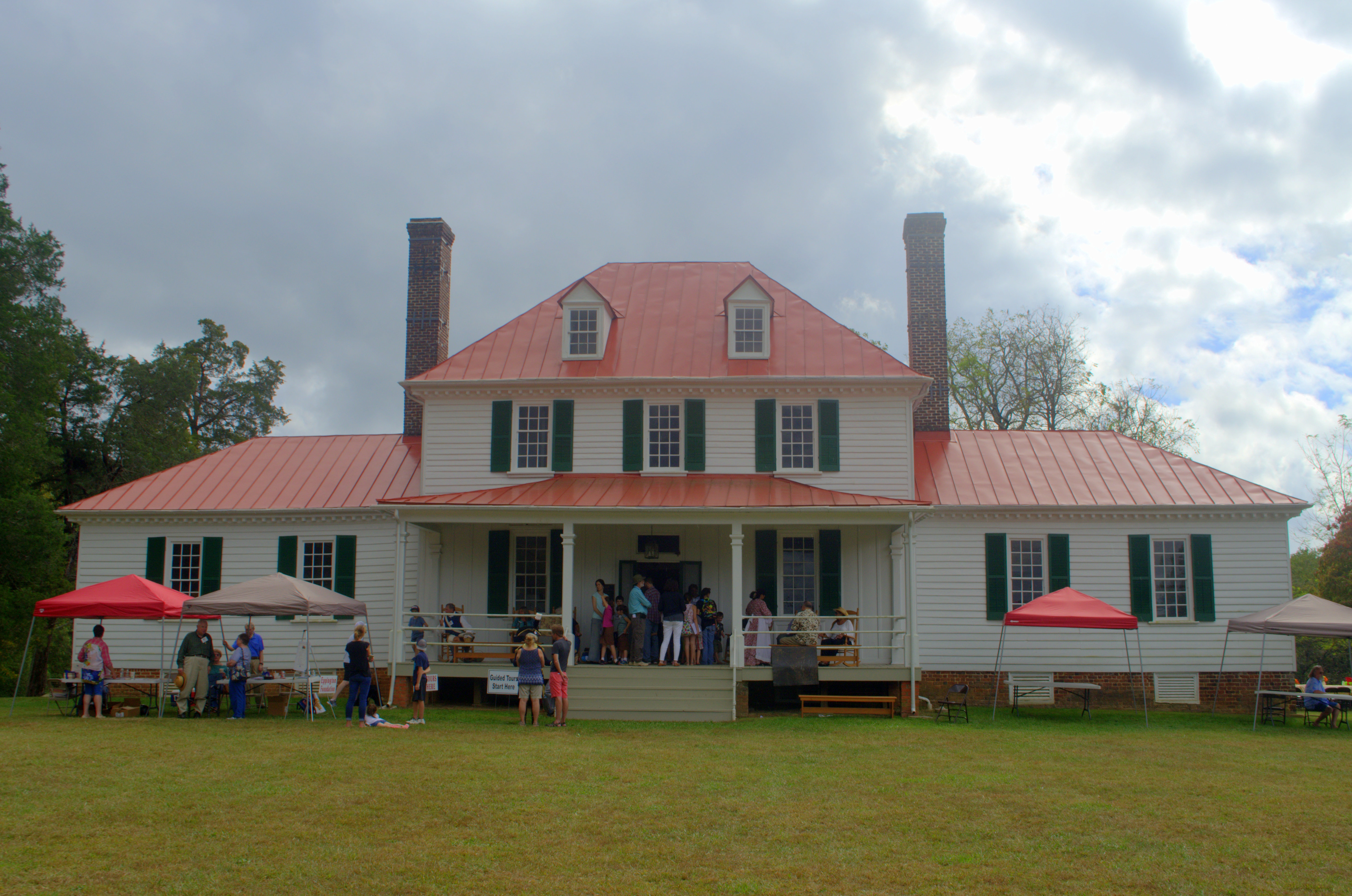
Eppington, the home of Elizabeth Wayles Eppes and Francis Wayles Eppes

The Jefferson daughters stayed at Eppington with their aunt and uncle, Elizabeth Wayles Eppes and Francis Wayles Eppes, who was her mother's cousin. Between December 1782 and May 1784, Patsy and Thomas were in Philadelphia. Patsy boarded with a family and received an education while her father worked in Philadelphia and awaited Congressional orders to go to France.

Polly and Lucy Elizabeth remained in Virginia with the Eppes family members as Patsy and her father lived in Philadelphia and then sailed for Paris on the ship Ceres on July 5, 1784, accompanied by James Hemings. Elizabeth Eppes provided Polly's early education, including reading, writing, dancing, and sewing. In the summer of 1786, Frances Eppes recommended that Jefferson provide her with a tutor to advance her education to include music, mathematics, English and French. The Eppes had six children. Lucy Elizabeth died of whooping cough on October 13, 1784 and Jefferson arranged for Polly to leave the Eppes household and join him in France. (Note: Over the course of a year, Maria was quite unhappy about the notion of leaving Eppington. She was finally, though, set to travel on the Robert and during the voyage became a friend of the captain, Andrew Ramsay. She stayed with Abigail Adams in England before being transported to France. At the thought of leaving Adams, Polly expressed the depth of attachment that they had created, "Oh, now that I have learned to love you, why will they take me from you?")

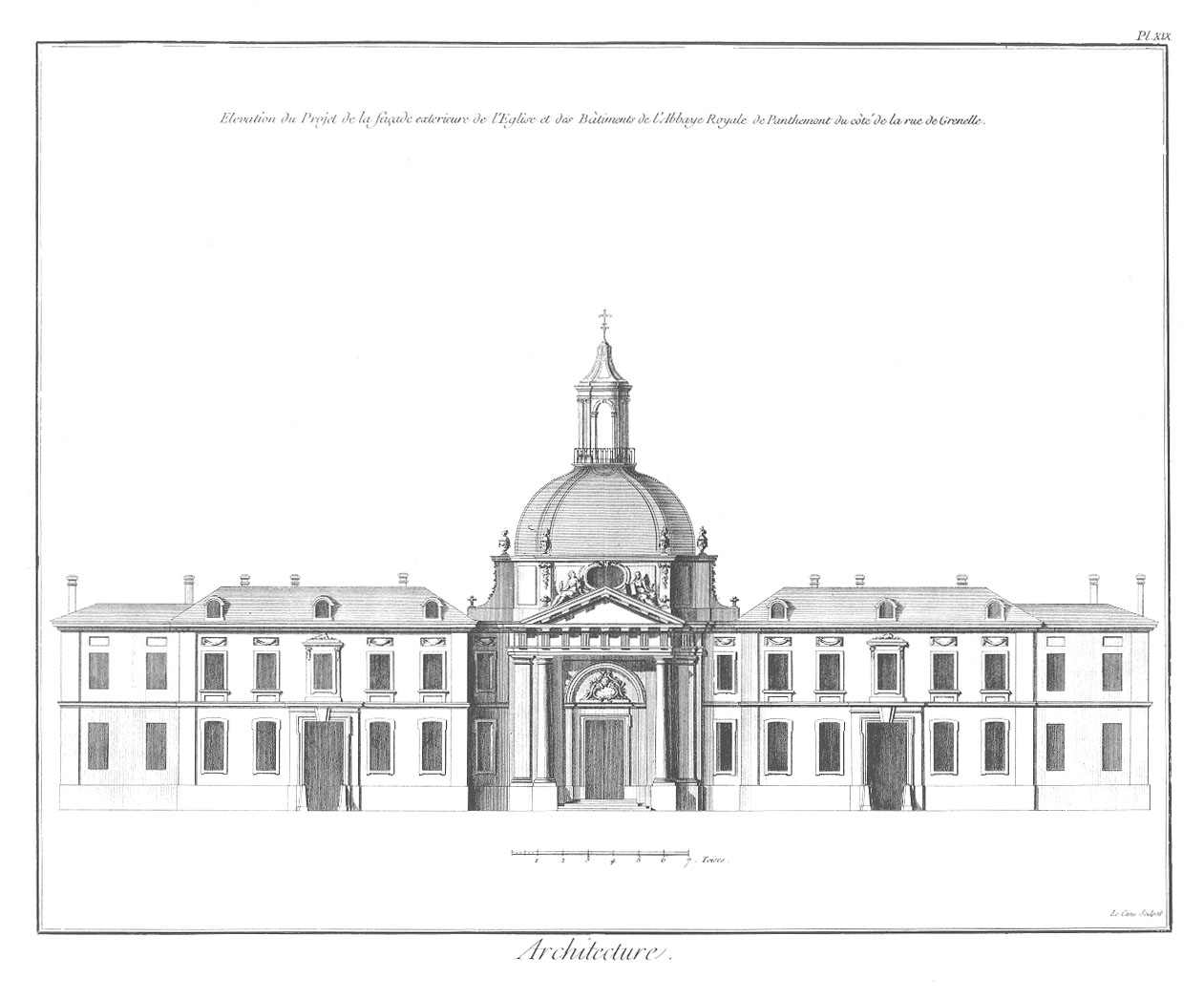
Polly attended the Pentemont Abbey convent school with her older sister Patsy

In the care of Sally Hemings, at age nine Polly sailed to Europe to join her father and older sister Patsy in Paris. They first landed in England, where Abigail Adams, wife of the U.S. Minister John Adams, looked after the girls before they joined her father in Paris: Abigail developed a deep and lasting affection for Polly. Jefferson received a letter from Adams that said that Polly was "the favorite of every creature in the House." In France, Polly attended the Pentemont Abbey convent school with her older sister Patsy. Polly, who had a love of reading, was sufficiently schooled that she did well at the elite school. She spoke French "easily enough" according to her father and in addition to her French studies, she also learned Spanish, drawing, and how to play the harpsichord. Polly and Patsy became ill with typhus and were at their father's house from the winter of 1788 until the spring of 1789. After Patsy expressed a desire to convert to Catholicism and said she was considering religious orders, Jefferson quickly withdrew her and her younger sister Polly from the school. The French Revolution broke out during their last few months in Paris.

Accompanied by their slaves Sally Hemings and her older brother James, who had served Jefferson as chef in Paris, the family returned to Virginia in 1789. At that time, Polly adopted the pronunciation and name "Maria" (with a long "i" in the British fashion), which she used the rest of her life. After living for a time in the temporary national capital of Philadelphia, Pennsylvania, while Jefferson was Secretary of State, the family returned to Monticello. Maria spent most of the rest of her short life in Virginia. She inherited her mother's beauty, which was frequently complimented, to her chagrin. She preferred to be known for her character or mind.

The youngest Daughter is a lovely Girl about 11 years of age. The perfect pattern of good temper, an engaging smile ever animates her Countenance, and the chearful attention which she pays to the judicious instructions and advice of her worthy Father, the Pertinent queries which she puts to him, and the evident improvement she makes in her knowledge of Foreign Languages, History and Geography, afford a pleasing Presage that when her faculties attain their maturity, she will be the delight of her Friends, and a distinguish’d ornament to her sex.

— Nathaniel Cutting, October 12, 1789 (Note: Nathaniel Cutting was the brother of one of Thomas Jefferson's friend, John Brown Cutting, became a lifelong friend himself, and was a ship's captain. He had visited with the Jefferson family and remarked in his journal "I never remember to have experienced so much regret at parting from a Family with whom I had so short an acquaintance. I have found Mr. Jefferson a man of infinite information and sound Judgment..." He also commented on his "enchantment" for Jefferson’s daughters and that he saw Jefferson teach Polly geography and Spanish.)

In the fall of 1792, her father enrolled her in Valeria Fullerton's school in Philadelphia, where she made good friends and was able to visit her father on Sundays. He lived near the school in Philadelphia at that time. She boarded there until September 1793, and may have been removed due to a yellow fever epidemic in Philadelphia that ultimately killed 5,000 people.

== Marriage and family ==
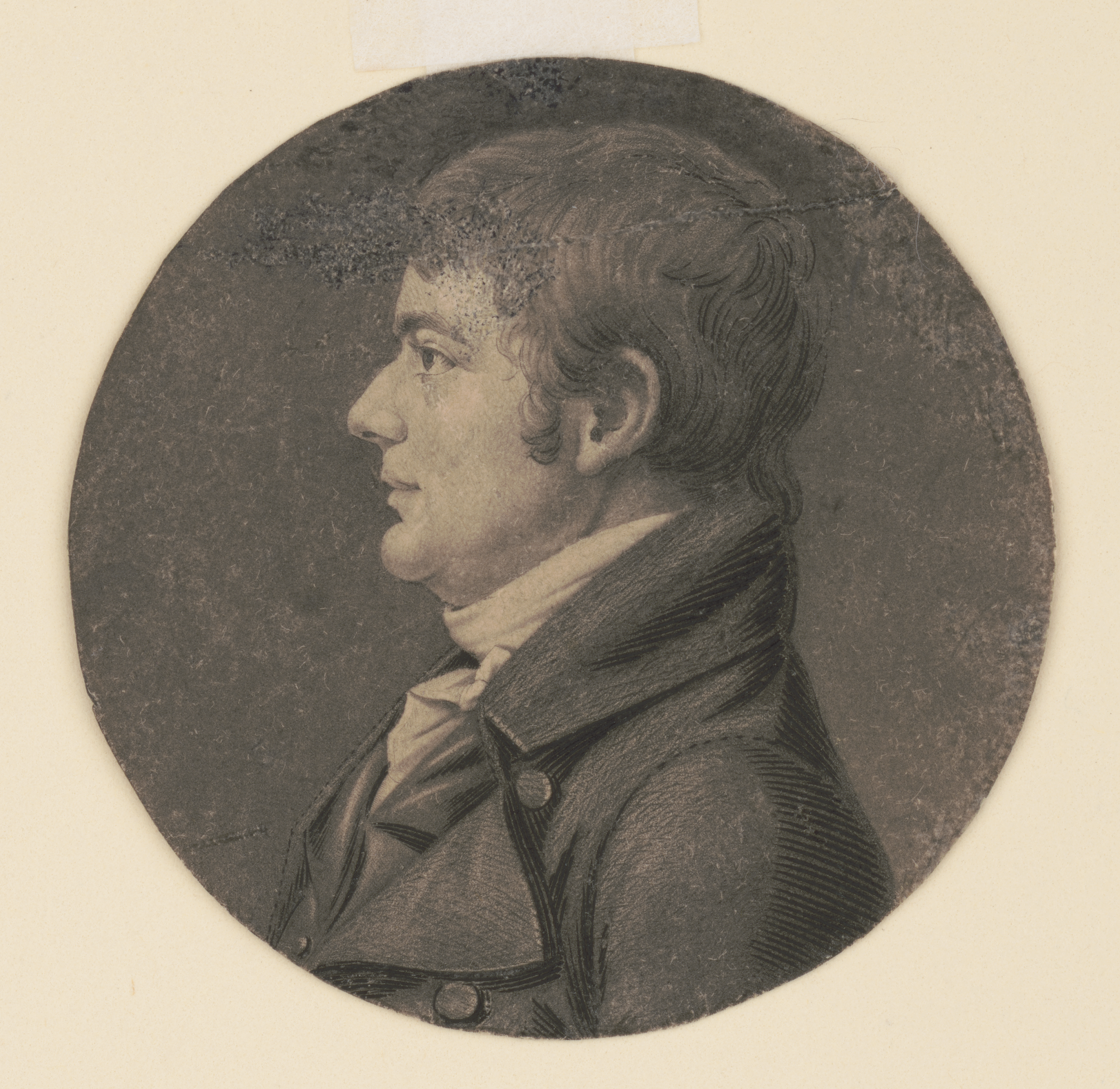
John Wayles Eppes

Maria, as she was now called, married her childhood friend and cousin John Wayles Eppes, the son of Francis and Elizabeth Epps, on October 13, 1797, at Monticello. The couple lived at his plantation, Mont Blanco, on the James River in Chesterfield and often visited his family's plantation, Eppington.

After several miscarriages, Maria and John had three children:

- an unnamed daughter (December 31, 1799 – January 1800)
- Francis Wayles Eppes (September 20, 1801 – May 30, 1881)
- Maria Jefferson Eppes (February 15, 1804 – February 1806)

Maria traveled with her sister to Washington from November 1802 to January 1803 where her sister served as their father's hostess and informal First Lady. Maria had poor health as her mother did. She never recovered physically from her third childbirth, and subsequently died on April 17, 1804 at Monticello, where she is buried.

My aunt, Mrs. Eppes, was singularly beautiful. She was high-principled, just, and generous. Her temper, naturally mild, became, I think, saddened by ill-health in the latter part of her life. In that respect she differed from my mother, whose disposition seemed to have the sunshine of heaven in it. ... [My mother] was intellectually somewhat superior to her sister, who was sensible of the difference, though she was of too noble a nature for her feelings ever to assume an ignoble character. There was between the sisters the strongest and warmest attachment, the most perfect confidence and affection.

— Ellen Wayles Randolph Coolidge to Henry S. Randall, January 15, 1856

Her death prompted Abigail Adams to send written condolences to President Jefferson; it was the first break in a long silence between the two families following the acrimonious presidential campaign of 1800. Abigail wrote movingly of the immediate affection she had felt for Maria when meeting her in London as a girl, an affection which had never altered.
