= Upper Appomattox canal system =

Upper Appomattox Canal Navigation System
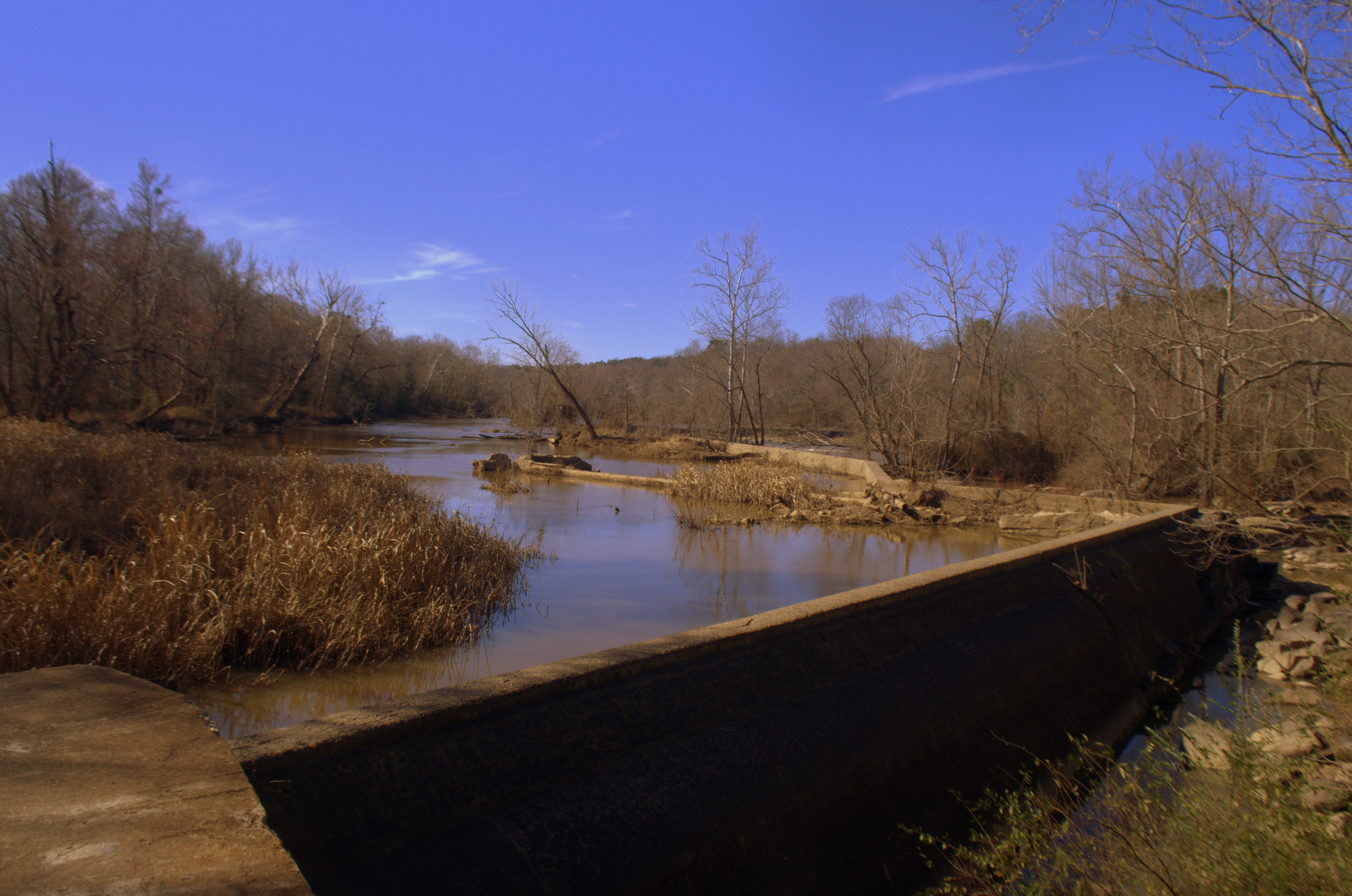
- The Abutment Dam, the Appomattox Canal Dam, brought water to the Upper Appomattox Canal.

Specifications
- Maximum boat beam: 5 ft 0 in (1.52 m)
- Locks: 17 Locks (Staircase fashion around the Fall Line and along the river)
- Status: No longer in use since 1890
- Navigation authority: Virginia General Assembly

History
- Original owner: Upper Appomattox Canal company
- Principal engineer: John Couty (1830)
- Date of act: 1796
- Construction began: 1809
- Date completed: 1816
- Date closed: 1890

Geography
- Start point: Farmville, Virginia
- End point: Petersburg, Virginia
- Branch: Appomattox River
- Branch of: James River

From 1745 to 1891, the Upper Appomattox Canal Navigation system enabled farmers to deliver wheat and corn to mills on the Appomattox River as far west as Farmville, Virginia, then to ship milled flour to Petersburg. The canal, which circumvented the falls at Petersburg, had a turning basin that let the long, narrow bateau reverse direction, unload shipments, and load goods for the return trip. The system thus served downstream markets destined for the Chesapeake Bay markets and upstream markets from the coastal plain. Canal boats also carried passengers in relative speed and comfort.

== History ==
The river was continuously modified over its life to facilitate transportation, including significant modifications circa 1745, much of labor by slaves as well as freed Blacks from Farmville's Israel Hill neighborhood served as boatmen. The canal suffered damage in the Civil War, but survived in use until it was displaced by rail transit.

=== Cleared 1745 ===
The Appomattox River was cleared for bateau by 1745. These boats were the same dimensions as the James River bateau, sixty feet long, six feet wide and two feet deep, appropriate to carry the largest load through the smallest parts of the river. Unlike the James River bateau, the Appomattox trips served westward and eastward river service, and were not sold off at the end of the voyage for their value as lumber.

To protect river navigation, the Virginia General Assembly enacted laws governing the James and Appomattox rivers, for example, forbidding construction of a river dam without locks for boat passage.

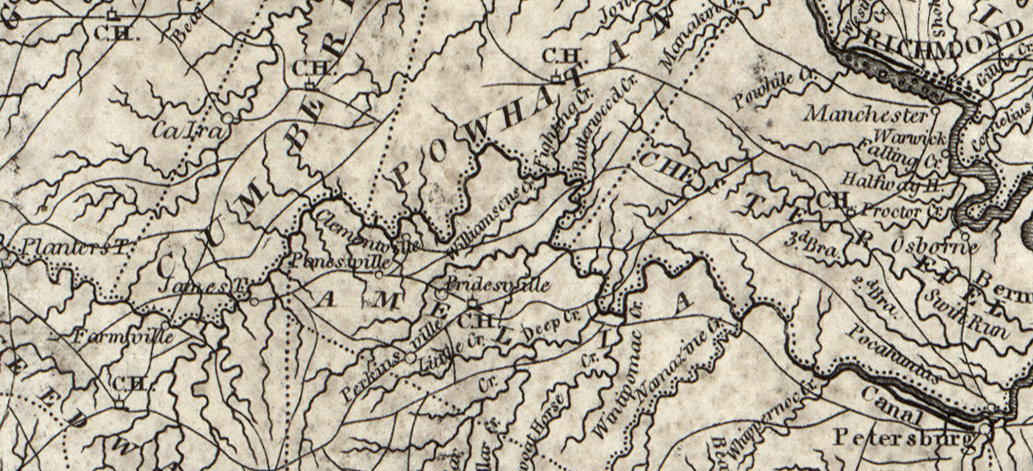
Appomattox River Canal Navigation System 1814 Map cropped from a map of Eastern Virginia by Samuel Lewis.

=== Upper Appomattox Company 1795 ===
Upper Appomattox Canal company
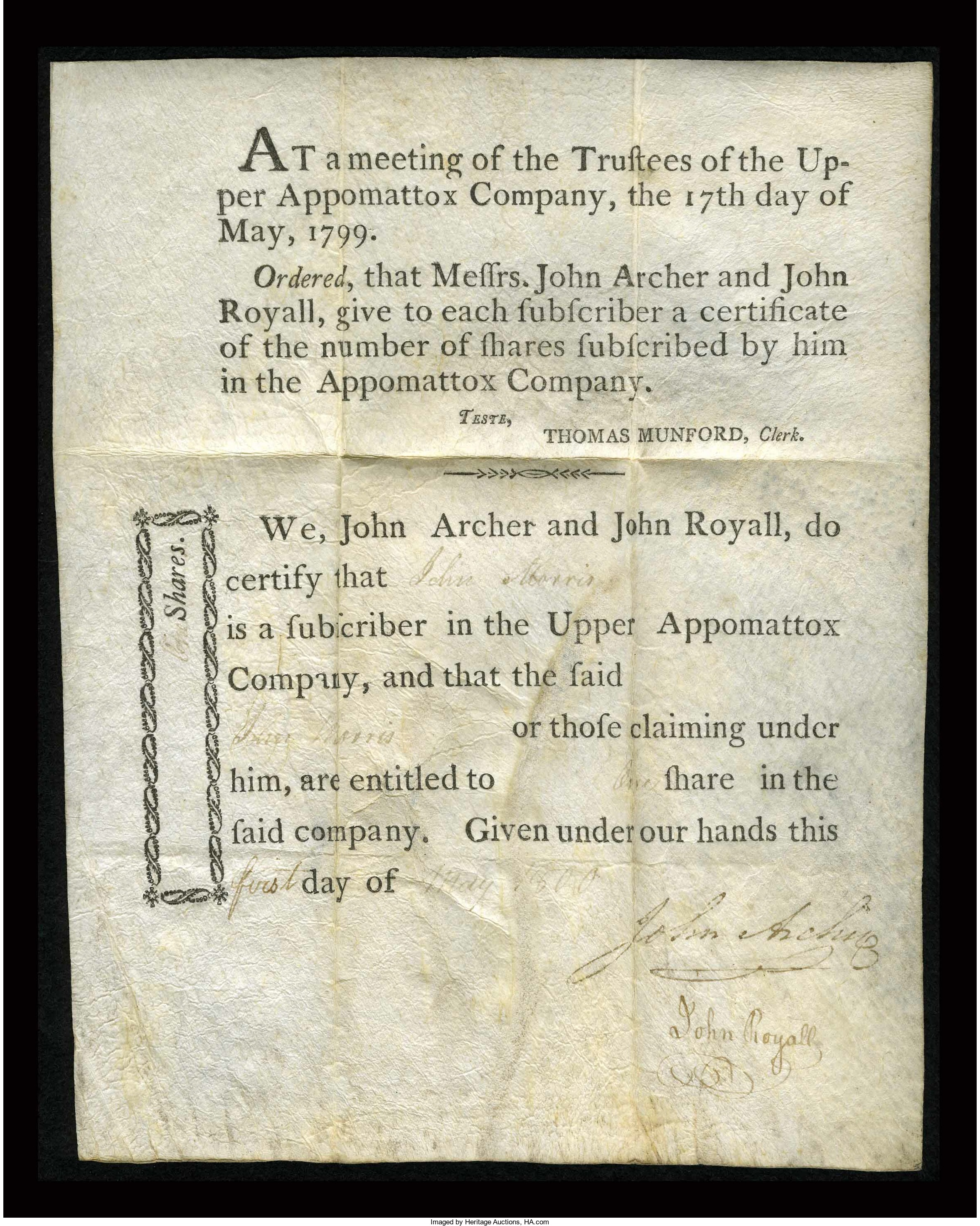
- Stock Certificate on Vellum.
- Type: Public
- Founded: 1795
- Defunct: 1890
- Area served: Farmville, Virginia to Petersburg, Virginia and Chesterfield, Amelia, Buckingham and Cumberland between.
- Key people: In 1799: John Archer, President; John Royal, Officer. In 1863: W.E. Hinton, President; N. M. Osborne, Officer; Major John Robinson Officer.

The Virginia General Assembly incorporated the Upper Appomattox Company in 1795. The state had bought 125 shares by 1801 to support the growth of transportation. In 1807, the company is allowed to sell bonds for one fourth of the expense of building the canal. A 335 foot long dam in the Appomattox diverted water to the canal. The canal was built entirely by enslaved Africans owned by the company.

=== Canal built in 1816 ===
The Appomattox Canal, completed in 1816, connected 5.5 miles from the head of the falls at the Fall Line on the Appomattox River to the Turning basin in Petersburg, Virginia. Built for $60,000, the canal could carry the bateau, six feet wide and three feet deep. With another $10,000 it could carry all river traffic. Slaves labored on the Appomattox River from Farmville to Petersburg, more than one hundred miles, constructing numerous wing dams to maintain the river's water level. The canal system included four stone staircase locks. Four watermills along the river had locks in their dams. Two of these watermills had stone locks.

The Canal around the falls had a navigable aqueduct made with stone arches and culverts to take boats over the Rohoic Creek confluence on the way to the canal basin. A short distance from the Basin, connected a by carriage route, were deepwater ports that allowed for transport of goods to and from the Chesapeake Bay and beyond.

=== Israel on the Appomattox ===
One-fourth of all cargo was transported from Farmville in bateaux on the Appomattox.

One-third of the bateaux were owned by free people of color, with the rest owned by white people who employed white boatmen as well as freemen and slaves.

In 1796, the will of plantation owner Richard Randolph freed the people he had enslaved, including Sam White; the will also bequeathed his land to them, enabling them to take ownership in 1810. The freemen founded the settlement of Israel Hill, where they built buildings, farmed, operated bateaux, and engaged in transportation commerce until the Emancipation Proclamation.

=== Rebuilt in 1830 ===
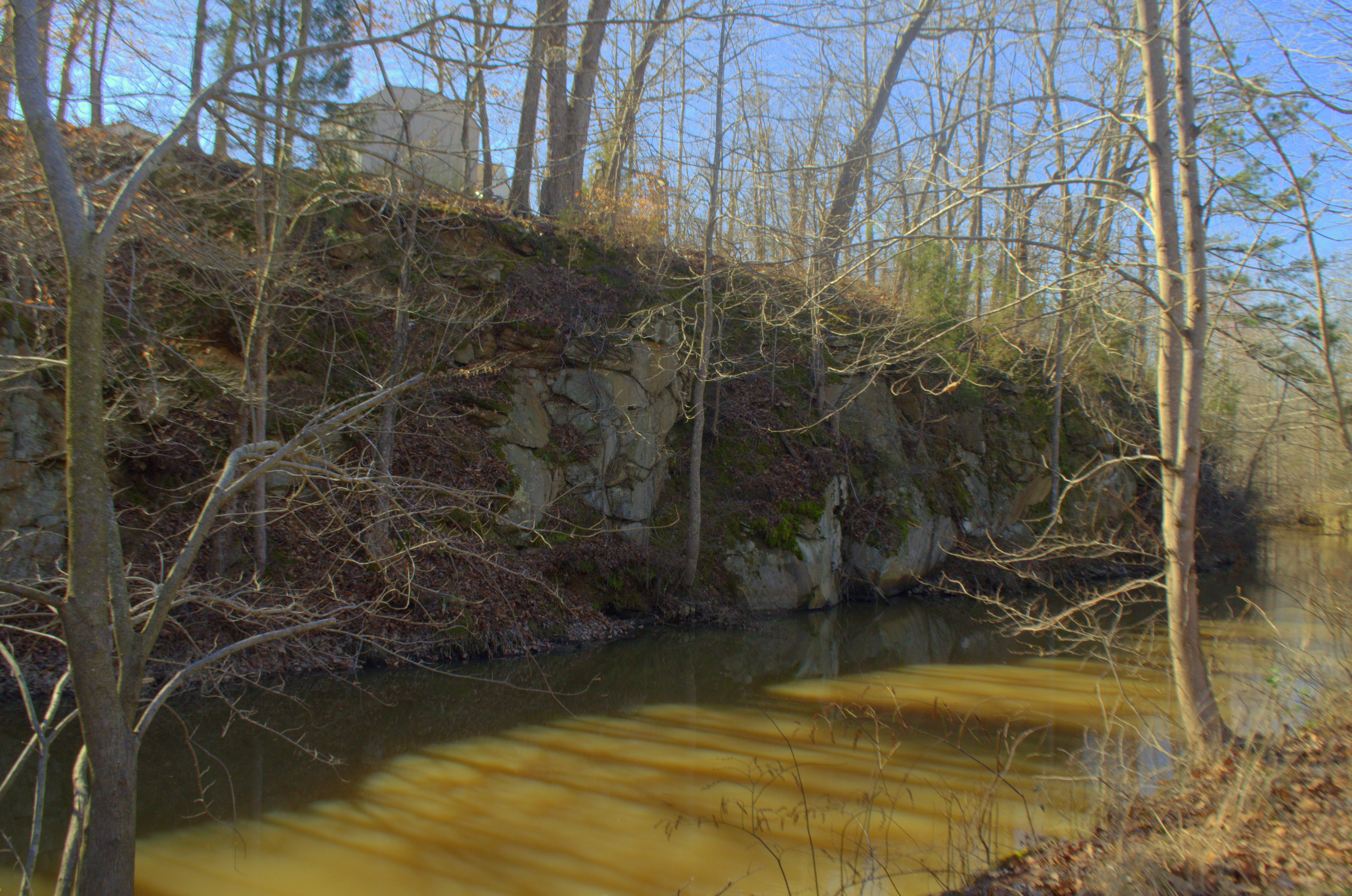
The Upper Appomattox Canal begins upstream as a contour canal split out of granite and dug out of soil and clay.

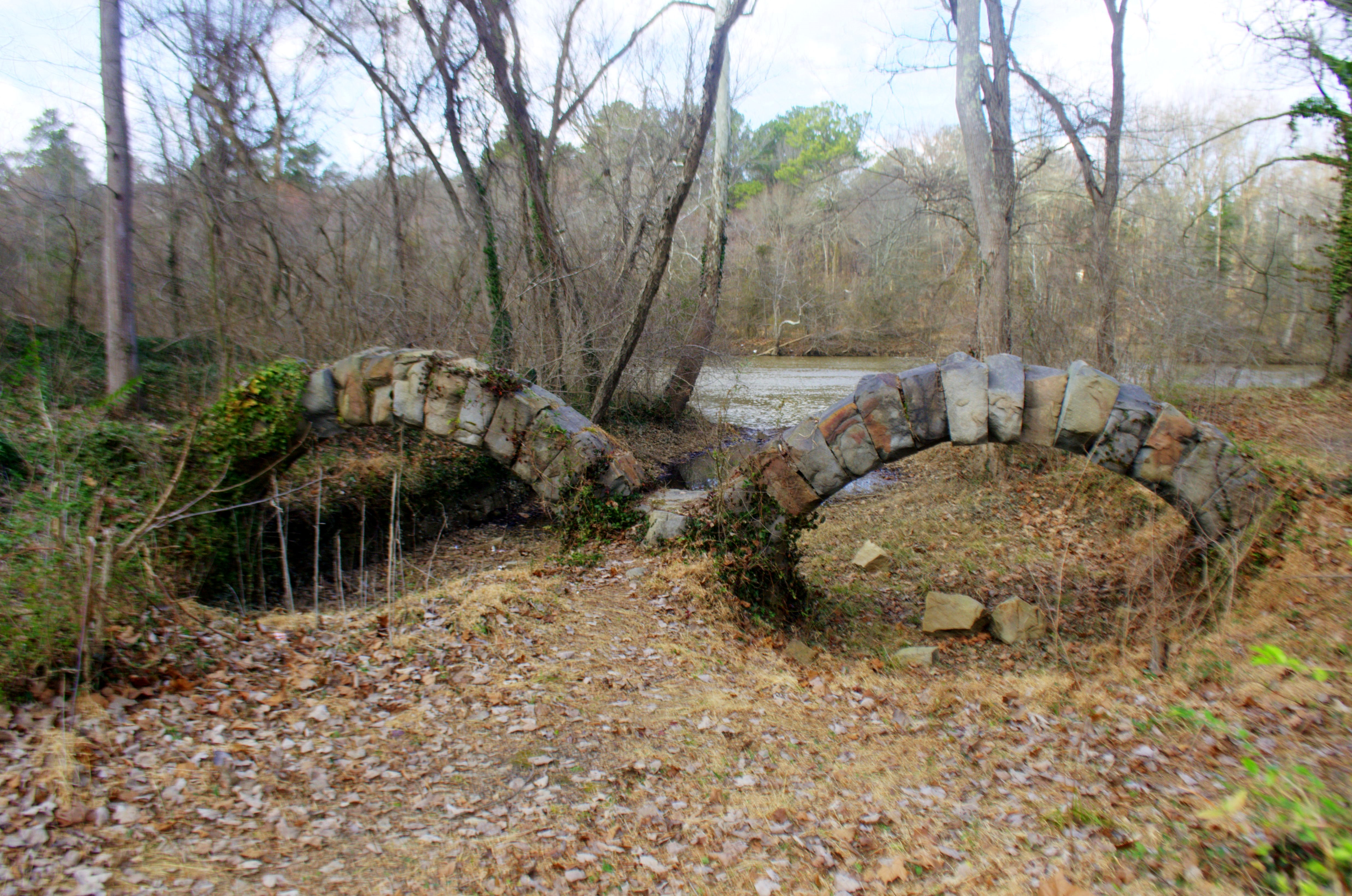
The granite arches of the navigable aqueduct over Rohoic Creek still remain.

In 1829, the Virginia General Assembly hired a public engineer to determine the possibility and cost of connecting the upper Appomattox River to the Roanoke River at the Mouth of the Staunton from the Appomattox past Farmville by canal or rail. However, that canal connection was never built.

The Upper Appomattox Canal, in Petersburg, was rebuilt by John Couty as a lock and dam system with a total of 17 locks and 8 miles. It was still designed for bateau. Tolls were paid by shippers to support the cost of maintaining the locks and dams. In fiscal year, 1831, boatmen shipped around 20,000 barrels of flour and 20,000 barrels of wheat; 5,000 hogsheads of tobacco leaf, and some tobacco stems; half a million pounds of manufactured goods, barrel staves, cotton, corn, salt, lime and iron. By 1836, Petersburg was connected to docks at City Point by the City Point Railroad rather than carriage. Petersburg was also connected to the north by rail on the Richmond and Petersburg Railroad and the South on the Petersburg Railroad in the 1830s.

=== Eppington ===
Epps Falls, at the Eppington Plantation, were deemed dangerous for passing boats by the Virginia General Assembly. The General Assembly gave Archibald Thweatt, owner of Eppington, compensation from any damages but allowed the Upper Appomattox Canal company to build a dam and locks around the falls in 1819. Archibald Thweatt and his heirs were also given leave to build a grist mill on the dam.

In the 1830s Eppington plantation at Epps Falls on the Appomattox River had 100 slaves, a warehouse and a dock. Neighboring farmers could ship farm produce from the docks. There were large loading facilities. When coal was first mined at the Clover Hill Pits, in 1837, it was taken by mule, later by rail, to the docks at Epps Falls. A boat that could carry seven tons of coal, made a four-day round trip to Petersburg for two dollars and thirty eight cents. This would soon be replaced by transport on the Clover Hill Railroad.

=== Water power below the basin in 1850 ===
Water flowing below the Basin down into the Appomattox powered mills and factories. The mills produced cotton, wool, hemp flax and flour. The flour was exported as far way as Brazil.

=== Civil War damage 1865 ===
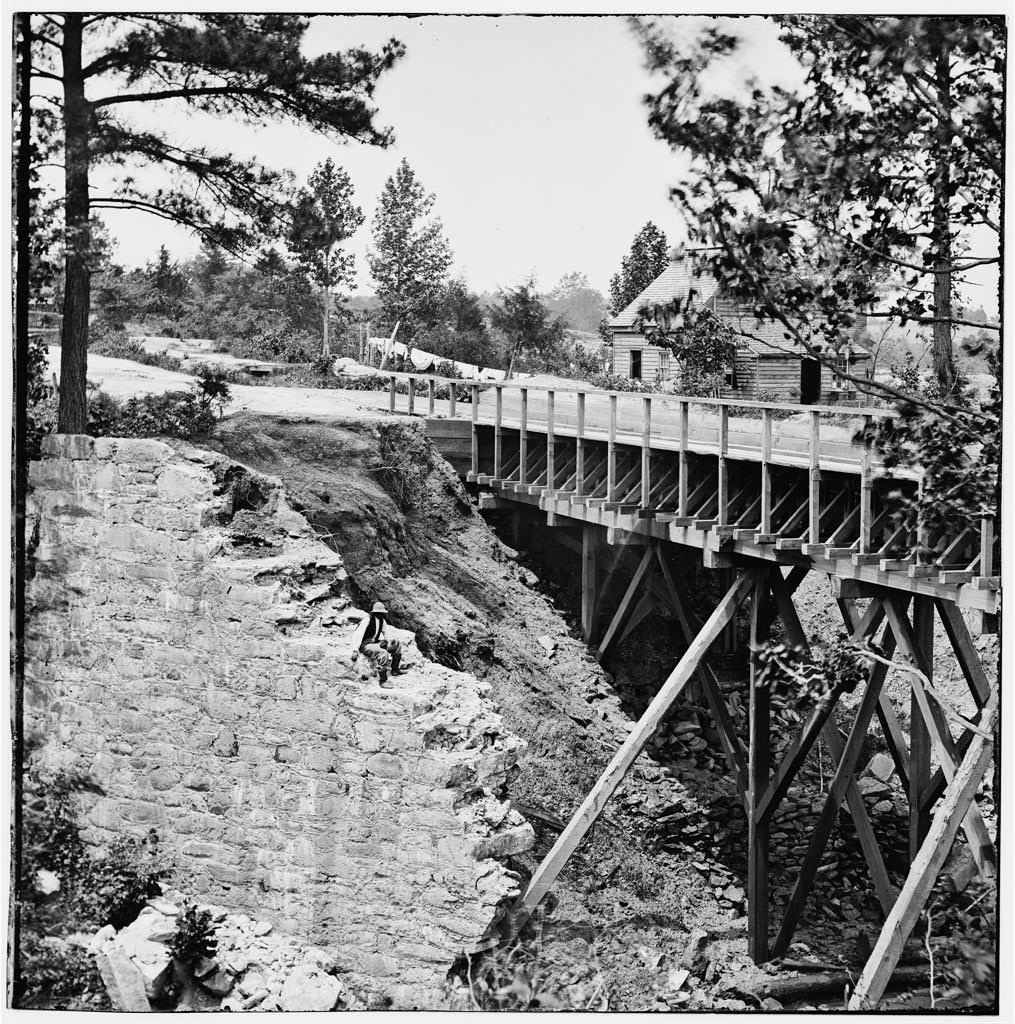
Canal Aqueduct - Petersburg 1865. Wooden Aqueduct to replace the damaged stone aqueduct.

During the Siege of Petersburg, in the American Civil War, there were not enough soldiers to block Union advancement in all places. The Confederate States Army dammed Rohoic Creek with a large dam that would be difficult to cross. The dam failed and washed away the 1826 navigable aqueduct and the Southside Railroad.

=== Upper Appomattox Canal company in Reconstruction 1872-1877 ===
In 1872, W.E. Hinton, Jr, as president of the Upper Appomattox Canal Company, asked shareholders to agree to correct mismanagement, since there had not been a shareholder meeting since 1866. This mismanagement included paying out dividends before making repairs to the canal. Dividends were paid out ignoring 70 shares of stock, out of roughly 1100, which allowed others to get a higher dividend. Also, one shareholder who tore down canal property tried to sell off the bricks. An unauthorized grist mill was built using the canal water. One officer who let the city of Petersburg take cobbles from canal property to build a road across the canal property to the officers own mill. This made other rentals of water useless, since a road lay where their mills would be. The mill owner would have had to buy water rights to the water power in a competitive bid, but having built a road where their competition would build mills, they paid a much lower price for the water. Hinton suggested that $600 was a reasonable rent to charge the mill owner, because there should have been a competitive bid allowed.

Senator Hinton, was elected as an officer in 1872 and got the right to sell bonds. In 1876, Bonds are given to Hinton as $4000 salary; sold to Captain N. M. Osborne and Major John Robinson of Baltimore and given to the State of Virginia, the Bank of Petersburg, and private banker N.M. Osborne and E.S. Stith as collateral. The money from the bonds, was used to rebuild the Navigable Aqueduct on Old Town Creek, now called Rohoic Creek, and rebuild a lock keeper's home, buildings, several locks and dams for mills. The next year the General Assembly gave the company the right to sell bonds to buy company stock back from the state. The General Assembly also let the company have an additional 10 years to buy back the stock.

=== After Reconstruction 1877 ===
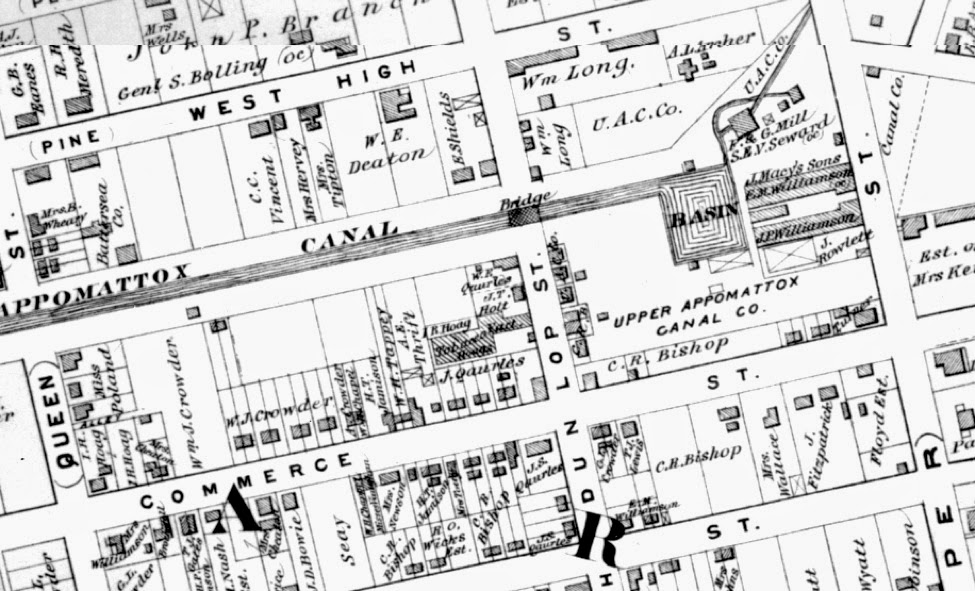
Detail Beers Map 1879 - Upper Appomattox Canal Turning Basin

After the Emancipation Proclamation and after the end of Reconstruction Era on April 2, 1877, the Virginia General Assembly approved the Virginia governor providing twenty to twenty five prisoners under convict lease to the Upper Appomattox canal company. Convict Lease was described by the writer Douglas A. Blackmon as "a system in which armies of free men, guilty of no crimes and entitled by law to freedom, were compelled to labor without compensation, were repeatedly bought and sold, and were forced to do the bidding of white masters through ... physical coercion."

=== Farmville and Powhatan Railroad connects to James River 1891 ===
The Canal was used in part until the 1890s. In 1890, the Canal would have had competition with the Farmville and Powhatan Railroad which competed with the Southside Railroad. The Farmville and Powhatan was connected all the way to Bermuda Hundred on the James River and Chester, Virginia, just north of Petersburg, in 1891. The railroad was narrow gauge but could provide transportation for goods and people over a similar route as the canal in just four hours. The railroads were pricing lower due to competition and made the trip in hours rather than days.

=== What remains of the canal today ===
The wing dams can still be seen in some places. The first few miles of the canal from the abutment dam, a contour canal, can be walked in Appomattox River Park in North Dinwiddie. Remains of the navigable aqueduct and other stone work remain on the Appomattox River & Heritage Trail in North Dinwiddie, Virginia. The straight part of the canal to the turning basin follows Upper Appomattox Street and was part of the Seaboard Air Line Railroad for many years. The location of the turning basin is at Dunlop Street, High Street, South Street and Commerce. The water used to flow down Canal street back to the Appomattox River. Eppington is still in Chesterfield and is open to the public a few days a year. Israel Hill has a historical marker in Farmville, Virginia.
