= Matoaca, Virginia =

- CDP
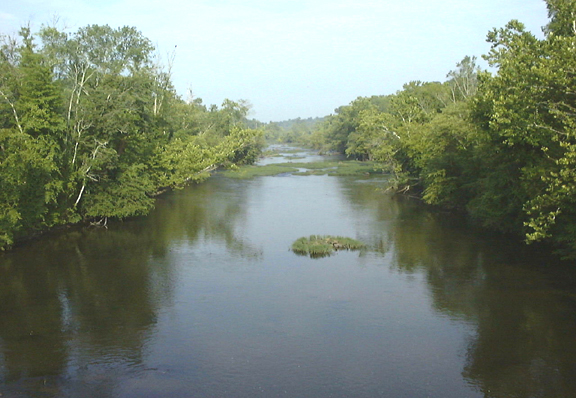
- The Appomattox River at Matoaca

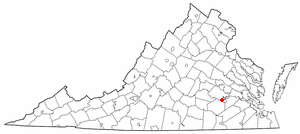
- Location of Matoaca, Virginia
- Coordinates: 37°13′41″N 77°28′14″W
- Country: United States
- State: Virginia
- County: Chesterfield

Area
  - Total: 2.7 sq mi (6.9 km^{2})
  - Land: 2.5 sq mi (6.6 km^{2})
  - Water: 0.12 sq mi (0.3 km^{2})
- Elevation: 141 ft (43 m)

Population (2020)
  - Total: 2,725
  - Density: 1,100/sq mi (410/km^{2})
- Time zone: UTC−5 (Eastern (EST))
  - Summer (DST): UTC−4 (EDT)
- FIPS code: 51-50136
- GNIS feature ID: 1497010

Matoaca is a census-designated place (CDP) in Chesterfield County, Virginia, United States. The population was 2,725 at the 2020 census. It is named after the Pamunkey Paramount Chief’s daughter Matoaka who was better known by her nickname "Pocahontas". It was near the site of an Appomattoc village Matoka or Matoks, which was reputedly her girlhood home, and the palace town of the weroansqua Oppussoquionuske.

In 2016 it was listed as No. 42 in CNN Money's Top 50 Places to Live in the United States.

== History ==
Olive Hill was listed on the National Register of Historic Places in 1975.

The Appomattox River is a nearly 160-mile-long water source once used as a pathway for early colonists. Its name is derived from the Indian tribe that once inhabited its banks. Because the Appomattox runs into the James River, it was a crucial port in Virginia during the Civil War as it allowed for larger ships to dock when necessary. In the spring of 1865, after the town of Petersburg had been taken over and destroyed during the Appomattox Campaign, the Confederates attempted to slow the persecution by the Union Army by burning the high bridge that ran across the Appomattox River. Failing to do so, the Confederate Army was later forced to surrender at Appomattox Court House.

== Geography ==
Matoaca is located at 37°13′41″N 77°28′14″W (37.228138, −77.470437).

According to the United States Census Bureau, the CDP has a total area of 2.7 square miles (7.0 km^{2}), of which 2.5 square miles (6.5 km^{2}) is land and 0.1 square miles (0.26 km^{2}), or 4.49%, is water.

== Demographics ==
Historical population
Census	Pop.	Note	%±
1970	829		—
1980	1,967		137.3%
2000	2,273		—
2010	2,403		5.7%
2020	2,655		10.5%
U.S. Decennial Census; 2000 2010 2020

Matoaca was first listed as a census designated place in the 2000 U.S. census.

=== Racial and ethnic composition ===
Matoaca CDP, Virginia – Racial and ethnic composition Note: the US Census treats Hispanic/Latino as an ethnic category. This table excludes Latinos from the racial categories and assigns them to a separate category. Hispanics/Latinos may be of any race.
Race / Ethnicity (NH = Non-Hispanic)	Pop 2000	Pop 2010	Pop 2020	% 2000	% 2010	% 2020
White alone (NH)	1,487	1,400	1,331	65.42%	58.26%	50.13%
Black or African American alone (NH)	727	886	1,047	31.98%	36.87%	39.44%
Native American or Alaska Native alone (NH)	5	3	22	0.22%	0.12%	0.83%
Asian alone (NH)	5	8	15	0.22%	0.33%	0.56%
Native Hawaiian or Pacific Islander alone (NH)	1	2	1	0.04%	0.08%	0.04%
Other race alone (NH)	3	2	6	0.13%	0.08%	0.23%
Mixed race or Multiracial (NH)	28	40	101	1.23%	1.66%	3.80%
Hispanic or Latino (any race)	17	62	132	0.75%	2.58%	4.97%
Total	2,273	2,403	2,655	100.00%	100.00%	100.00%

=== 2000 census ===
As of the census of 2000, there were 2,273 people, 866 households, and 651 families residing in the CDP. The population density was 892.0 people per square mile (344.2/km^{2}). There were 911 housing units at an average density of 357.5/sq mi (137.9/km^{2}). The racial makeup of the CDP was 65.55% White, 32.12% African American, 0.22% Native American, 0.31% Asian, 0.04% Pacific Islander, 0.26% from other races, and 1.50% from two or more races. Hispanic or Latino of any race were 0.75% of the population.

There were 866 households, out of which 34.2% had children under the age of 18 living with them, 53.8% were married couples living together, 16.2% had a female householder with no husband present, and 24.8% were non-families. 20.8% of all households were made up of individuals, and 9.6% had someone living alone who was 65 years of age or older. The average household size was 2.62 and the average family size was 3.03.

In the CDP, the population was spread out, with 27.2% under the age of 18, 6.2% from 18 to 24, 29.7% from 25 to 44, 22.9% from 45 to 64, and 14.0% who were 65 years of age or older. The median age was 38 years. For every 100 females, there were 90.1 males. For every 100 females age 18 and over, there were 86.6 males.

The median income for a household in the CDP was $50,000, and the median income for a family was $56,163. Males had a median income of $33,722 versus $26,071 for females. The per capita income for the CDP was $19,810. About 5.8% of families and 6.2% of the population were below the poverty line, including 2.9% of those under age 18 and 10.6% of those age 65 or over.

== Education ==
The local schools are Matoaca Elementary School, Matoaca Middle School and Matoaca High School.

In relation to education levels in Matoaca, Virginia, roughly 89% of residents have earned a high school diploma. Though the area is known for its small population, specifically about 2,400 people, nearly 1,500 of those are enrolled in school. Of those who furthered their education beyond high school, about 10% have graduated and received a college degree. To be more specific, 6% have earned an associate degree, 7% have earned a bachelor's degree, and 3% have earned a professional degree.
