= John Wayles Eppes =

American politician (1772–1823)

John W. Eppes
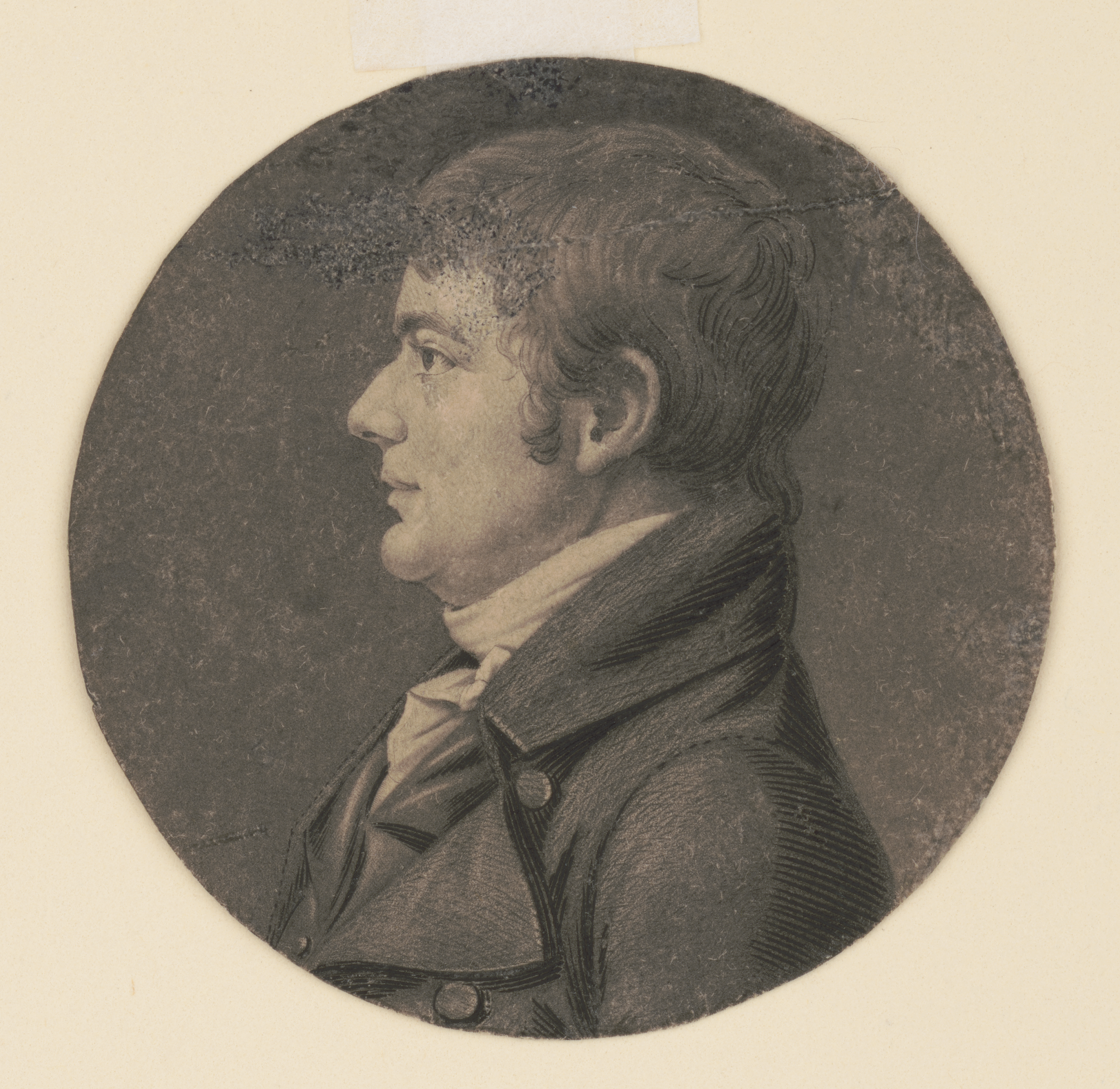

United States Senator from Virginia
- In office March 4, 1817 – December 4, 1819
- Preceded by: Armistead T. Mason
- Succeeded by: James Pleasants

Member of the U.S. House of Representatives from Virginia's 16th district
- In office March 4, 1813 – March 3, 1815
- Preceded by: James Pleasants
- Succeeded by: John Randolph
- In office March 4, 1803 – March 3, 1811
- Preceded by: Anthony New
- Succeeded by: James Pleasants

Member of the Virginia House of Delegates from Chesterfield County
- In office December 7, 1801 – March 4, 1803 Serving with Matthew Cheatham
- Preceded by: Thomas Augustus Taylor
- Succeeded by: Isaac Salle

Personal details
- Born: John Wayles Eppes; April 1772 Eppington, Virginia Colony, British America
- Died: September 13, 1823 (aged 51) Buckingham County, Virginia, U.S.
- Resting place: Eppes family cemetery at Millbrook
- Party: Democratic-Republican
- Spouses: Mary Jefferson Eppes (m. 1797; died 1804) Martha Burke Jones (m. 1809)
- Children: 9, including Francis W. Eppes
- Education: Hampden–Sydney College
- Profession: Lawyer, planter, politician

John Wayles Eppes (April 1772 – September 13, 1823) was an American lawyer and politician. He represented Virginia in the U.S. House of Representatives from 1803 to 1811 and again from 1813 to 1815. He also served in the U.S. Senate (1817–1819). His positions in Congress occurred after he served in the Virginia House of Delegates representing Chesterfield County (1801–1803).

== Early life and education ==
Eppes was born in April 1772 at Eppington, in Chesterfield County in the Colony of Virginia, the sixth child and only son of Elizabeth (née Wayles) and Francis Eppes, who would serve one term in the House of Delegates a decade later. A member of the First Families of Virginia, he was related through both his parents to Martha Jefferson, his mother's half-sister and the wife of Thomas Jefferson, with whom Eppes was close.

After being taught by tutors as was customary in his planter class, Eppes attended the University of Pennsylvania at Philadelphia, and graduated from Hampden–Sydney College in Virginia in 1786. He studied law and was admitted to the bar in 1794, commencing practice in the state capital, Richmond.

== Marriage and family ==
Eppes married his first cousin Mary Jefferson (known as "Polly" in childhood and "Maria" as an adult) on October 13, 1797, at Monticello. They resided at Mont Blanco plantation in Chesterfield County, Virginia.

After several miscarriages, Maria and John had three children:

- Unnamed daughter Eppes (December 31, 1799 – January 1800)
- Francis Wayles Eppes (September 20, 1801 – May 30, 1881)
- Maria Jefferson Eppes (February 15, 1804 – February 1806)

Mary died at Monticello on April 17, 1804, two months after the birth of Maria, and is buried there.

On April 15, 1809, Eppes married Martha Burke Jones, daughter of Willie Jones, a prominent North Carolina planter and politician. They had six children.

=== Betsy Hemmings ===
After Mary's death, Eppes moved his household and slaves from Mont Blanco to another of his plantations called Millbrook in Buckingham County, Virginia. Among the slaves was Betsy Hemmings, the mixed-race daughter of Mary Hemings and granddaughter of Betty Hemings. According to her descendants, Hemmings became a concubine to Eppes in a relationship that began when he was a young widower. They had a son, Joseph, likely named for her brother. She named their daughter Frances, a name traditional among men in the Eppes family. She lived at Milbrook for the rest of her life, and when she died in 1857, was buried next to John Wayles Eppes in the family cemetery there.

== Political career ==
Eppes was a member of the Virginia House of Delegates from 1801 to 1803 alongside Matthew Cheatham. On March 4, 1803, he won election as a Democratic-Republican to the Eighth United States Congress and the next three succeeding Congresses, so he was frequently away from his plantations. He chaired the Ways and Means Committee for the Eleventh Congress but lost his re-election attempt so did not serve in the Twelfth, but instead spent the next two years at his Milbrook plantation.

Eppes won election to the Thirteenth Congress (March 4, 1813 – March 4, 1815) and again chaired the Committee on Ways and Means. After losing the election to the Fourteenth Congress, he was elected to the United States Senate and served from March 4, 1817, until December 4, 1819, when he resigned because of ill health. He chaired the Committee on Finance during the second session of the Fifteenth Congress.

== Retirement and death ==
Late in life Eppes suffered from various ailments. He died at Millbrook on September 13, 1823, and was buried in the Eppes family cemetery at Millbrook.

U.S. House of Representatives
Preceded by Anthony New	Member of the U.S. House of Representatives from Virginia's 16th congressional district March 4, 1803 – March 4, 1811	Succeeded by James Pleasants
Preceded by James Pleasants	Member of the U.S. House of Representatives from Virginia's 16th congressional district March 4, 1813 – March 4, 1815	Succeeded by John Randolph
U.S. Senate
Preceded by Armistead T. Mason	U.S. senator (Class 2) from Virginia; March 4, 1817 – December 4, 1819; Served alongside: James Barbour	Succeeded by James Pleasants
