= Olive Hill (Matoaca, Virginia) =

Historic house in Virginia, United States

- U.S. National Register of Historic Places
- Virginia Landmarks Register
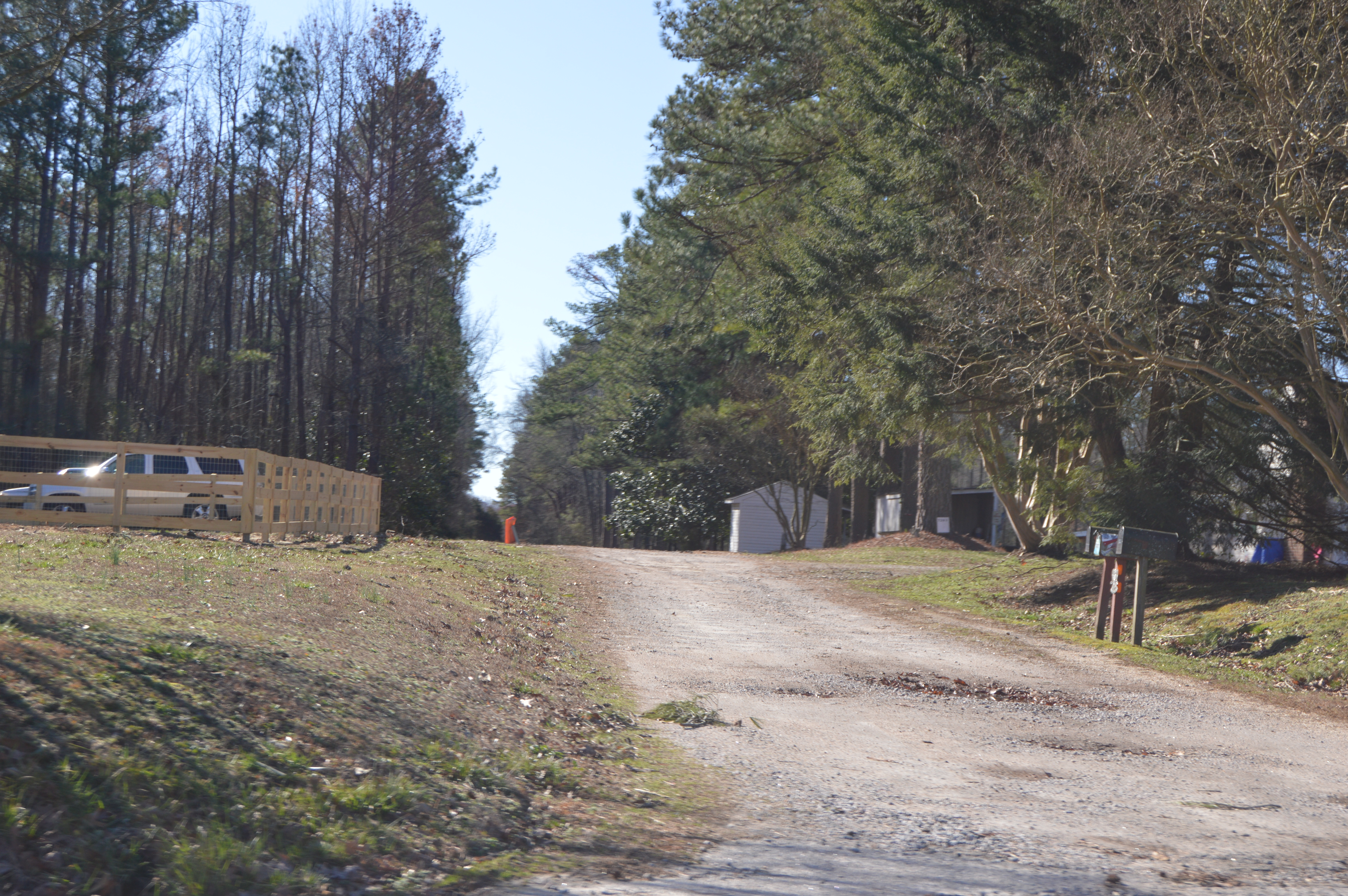
- Property entrance

- Location within Virginia Location within the United States
- Location: 0.5 miles (0.8 km) west of Matoaca off VA 36, near Matoaca, Virginia
- Coordinates: 37°13′34″N 77°29′48″W
- Area: 75 acres (30 ha)
- Built: 1740
- Architectural style: Georgian
- NRHP reference No.: 75002017
- VLR No.: 020-0049

Significant dates
- Added to NRHP: April 3, 1975
- Designated VLR: December 17, 1974

Olive Hill is a historic plantation house located near Matoaca in Chesterfield County, Virginia. It was built in 1740, and is a two-story, five-bay-wide, white frame house in the Georgian style. The original structure measures 38 by 32 feet (11.6 by 9.8 m). It is sheathed in molded weatherboard and topped by a pedimented roof. The interior features a Chinese lattice stair with a molded hand rail.

It was listed on the National Register of Historic Places in 1975.
