= Thomas Ritchie (journalist) =

American journalist (1778–1854)

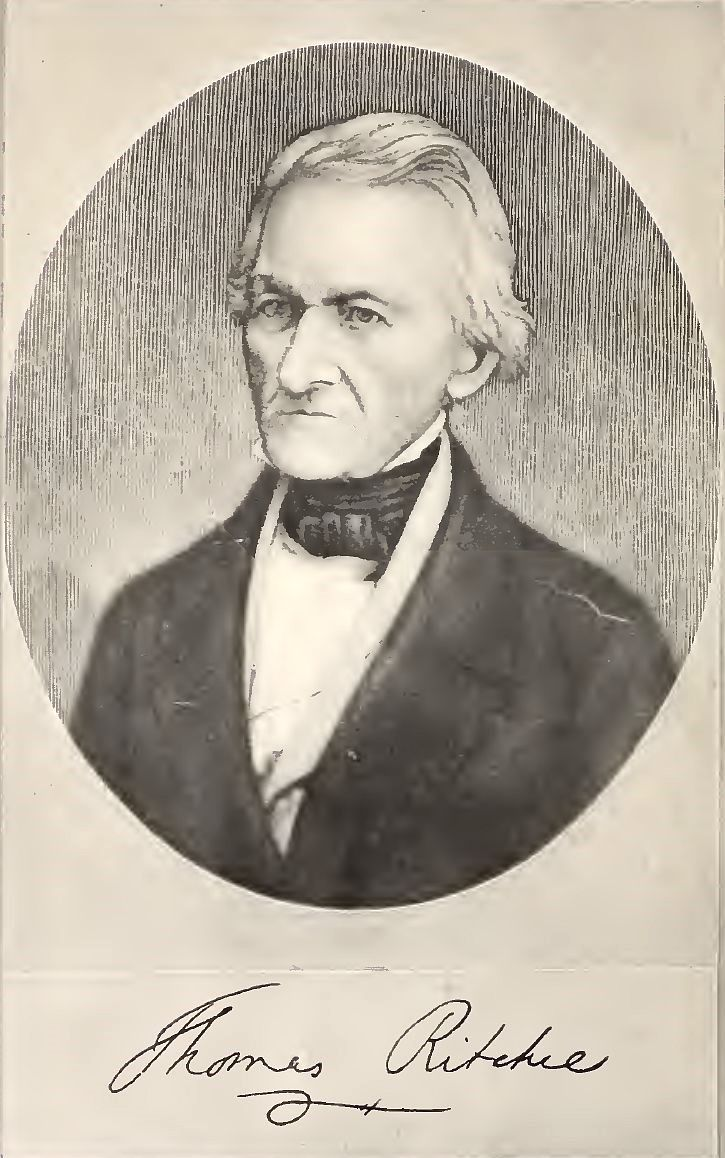
- Portrait of Ritchie
- Born: November 5, 1778; Tappahannock, Province of Virginia, British America
- Died: July 2, 1854 (aged 75); Washington, D.C., U.S.
- Resting place: Hollywood Cemetery; Richmond, Virginia, U.S.
- Occupations: Journalist; newspaper publisher
- Political party: Democratic-Republican
- Spouse: Isabella Foushee (m. 1807)
- Children: 7
- Relatives: Spencer Roane (cousin)

Thomas Ritchie (November 5, 1778 – July 3, 1854) of Virginia was a leading American newspaper journalist, editor and publisher.

== Early life ==
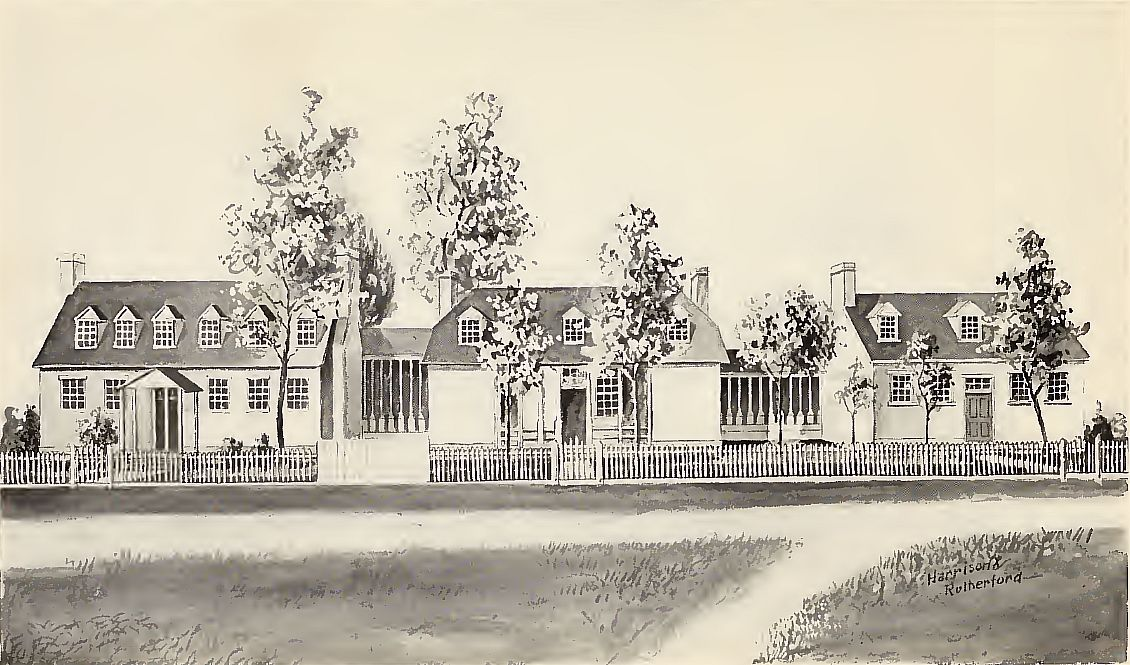
Birthplace of Thomas Ritchie, Tappahannock, Virginia

Thomas Ritchie was born on November 5, 1778, in Tappahannock, Virginia, to Mary (née Roane) and Archibald Ritchie. His father emigrated from Scotland and his cousin was Spencer Roane. At the age of six, his father died. He studied law under Spencer Roane and attended a winter's course of medical lectures in Philadelphia.

== Career ==
Ritchie took up teaching and took charge of an academy in Fredericksburg. In 1803, he moved to Richmond and set up a bookstore there. On May 9, 1804, he bought the Republican newspaper the Richmond Enquirer from the Jones family with its current mechanical department head W. W. Worsley. On July 30, 1805, he became sole editor and owner and he made it a financial and political success, as editor and publisher for 41 years. The paper appeared three times a week. Thomas Jefferson said of the Enquirer: "I read but a single newspaper, Ritchie's Enquirer, the best that is published or ever has been published in America." Ritchie wrote the stirring partisan editorials, clipped the news from Washington and New York papers, and did most of the local reporting himself. At one point, he served on Richmond's city council. He was state printer from December 5, 1814, to 1834. In November 1834, he lost the election to Samuel Shepherd. He was re-elected in 1835 and served as state printer until his retirement in 1839. He was elected as printer of the U.S. House of Representatives on December 3, 1845, and later elected as printer of the U.S. Senate on December 17. He served alongside Heiss. He was editor of the Richmond Compiler paper from 1816 to 1833 and The Crisis papers.

On July 1, 1807, following the Chesapeake–Leopard affair, he served as secretary of the Richmond meeting to protest the British's "right to search". Ritchie was elected as ensign with the Richmond Republican Blues, a military group led by Peyton Randolph and organized to defend Norfolk. He also briefly served during the War of 1812 as a lieutenant in a volunteer company. Ritchie was a leader of the "Richmond Junto" that controlled the Republican state committee, originally with Ritchie's relatives Spencer Roane and Dr. John Brockenbrough of the Virginia State Bank. Richmond was a violent frontier town when Ritchie arrived. Controversial rival journalist and Jefferson opponent James T. Callender was found drowned in three feet of water in 1803. Nonetheless, Ritchie set up a press and began advocating restrictions on free blacks as well as slave manumissions. Lawyer and Richmond Enquirer founding editor Meriwether Jones died in a duel on August 3, 1806. John Daly Burk and Skelton Jones (Meriwether's brother) also both died in duels before completing a projected four volume history of Richmond. Ritchie editorialized against South Carolina and Georgia reopening the transatlantic slave trade, and later for U.S. intervention in the War of 1812. Political rivals also could find themselves excoriated in the press, and even President James Monroe was not immune. A faction of the Democratic-Republican party, once nicknamed the quids and thought more radical than Jefferson, grew increasingly pro-slavery, anti-foreigner and anti-Catholic over time. Committed to democratic reform in representation of the western counties and full manhood suffrage (for whites), Ritchie promoted the 1829 Virginia state constitutional convention. A modernizer, Ritchie came to promote public schools and extensive state internal improvements.

In national politics, Ritchie's influence rested first on an alliance with New York Senator Martin Van Buren. They both promoted William H. Crawford's presidential candidacy in 1824, and next that of Andrew Jackson in 1828. Ritchie favored the "Old Republican" "principles of '98, '99" against what he considered the corrupting influence of Henry Clay and the divisive tactics of John C. Calhoun, whose nullification and Southern-party policies Ritchie detested. Late in his life, Ritchie denounced abolitionists but supported gradual emancipation.

On March 2, 1843, Ritchie brought his sons William F. and Thomas into management of the Enquirer under the firm Thomas Ritchie & Sons. In 1845, he gave full control of the paper to his sons. In the 1844 US presidential election, Ritchie supported James K. Polk because of Polk's support for the annexation of Texas. Polk brought Ritchie to Washington to edit the national paper The Union (1845 to 1851). Ritchie supported the Compromise of 1850, but the new paper never was as influential as the Enquirer. Meanwhile, Ritchie had lost his Virginia base, as his son and namesake took over the Richmond Enquirer. In 1846, Thomas Ritchie Jr. killed Richmond Whig founder and editor John Hampden Pleasants in a duel.

== Personal life ==
Ritchie married the Isabella Foushee, daughter of Dr. William Foushee, of Richmond on February 7, 1807. They had four daughters and three sons, including William F. and Thomas Jr. He died on July 3, 1854, in Washington, D.C. His funeral was attended by President Franklin Pierce. He was buried in Hollywood Cemetery in Richmond.

== See also ==
- Charles Henry Ambler – Preeminent Virginia & West Virginia historian, and Thomas Ritchie biographer
- History of Virginia
- History of West Virginia
