= John Guerrant =

American planter, officer and politician (1760–1813)

Member of the Virginia Council of State
- In office 1797–1805

Member of the Virginia House of Delegates from Goochland County
- In office October 15, 1787 – December 1796 Serving with Thomas Underwood, Thomas Mann Randolph Sr., William Randolph Fleming, Thomas Royster, Thomas Miller
- Preceded by: Thomas Mann Randolph Sr. or John Peter Guerrant
- Succeeded by: James Pleasants

Personal details
- Born: March 23, 1760 Goochland County, Colony of Virginia
- Died: December 7, 1813 (aged 53) Goochland County, Virginia
- Resting place: Perkinsville, Goochland County, Virginia
- Spouse: Mary Heath Povall
- Children: 5 sons, 5 daughters
- Parents: John Peter Guerrant (father); Elizabeth Porter (mother)
- Occupation: military officer, farmer, politician

Military service
- Allegiance: United States
- Branch/service: Virginia Regiment (Virginia Colonial Militia); Continental Army
- Years of service: 1777–1780
- Rank: ensign, major
- Unit: 2nd Virginia Regiment
- Battles/wars: Valley Forge

John Guerrant (March 23, 1760 – December 7, 1813 ) was a Virginia military officer, planter and politician descended from Huguenot refugees. He served in the Continental Line during the American Revolutionary War, then several terms in the Virginia House of Delegates representing his native Goochland County, which he also represented in the Virginia Ratifying Convention of 1788, during which he voted against ratification of the U.S. Constitution. Guerrant later aligned with the Democratic-Republican Party and also served on the Virginia Council of State.

== Early life ==
The son of John Peter Guerrant (1733–1812) and his wife, the former Elizabeth Porter was descended from Pierre Guerrant, one of the Huguenot refugees who settled near Manakintown on the north bank of the James River. Guerrant received an education appropriate to his class (Virginia not having any public schools in that era).

== Military officer ==
Near the beginning of the American Revolutionary War, in 1777, this man's father John (or Jean) Peter Guerrant enlisted in the Continental Army with this son (then 17 years old) and his brother Daniel (then 14 years old). His father achieved the rank of major with the 2nd Virginia Regiment of the Continental Line, as did this man who served as the unit's paymaster. One of the John Guerrants was a sergeant in 1777. They served under Gen. William Woodford, including at the Battle of Monmouth in New Jersey, and overwintered at Valley Forge in Pennsylvania before participating in the Southern Campaign near the war's end (in which Gen. Woodford was captured in Charleston, South Carolina and later died on a prison ship in New York harbor). Captain Charles Scott led this Goochland company. This man had become a commissioned officer and achieved the rank of major by August 20, 1781, although his brother Daniel only rose to the rank of lieutenant. Following the conflict, the U.S. Congress passed legislation awarding the Guerrant family a sword with an ivory handle, which later descendants treasured. This man continued in the Virginia militia, and rose to the rank of brigadier general (of its 3rd Brigade) in 1799.

== Planter ==
Guerrant's father operated a plantation called "Ceres" with his sons in Goochland County, using enslaved labor. In the last tax census of both their lives, John Guerrant Sr. enslaved 21 people, Daniel Guerrant 15 people and John Guerrant Jr. 32 people. Complicating matters, state tax records usually refer to "Col." (Colonel) John Guerrant and "Gent." (Gentleman) John Guerrant.

== Politician ==
Goochland voters first elected a John Guerrant as one of their representatives in the Virginia House of Delegates in 1787, but that part-time legislator may have been this man's father. The man who began legislative service after serving in the Virginia Ratifying Convention in 1788 (and was re-elected many times) was recorded in the 1789 and later sessions as "John Guerrant, Jr." (possibly because of the fame of his father). Thus, his father may have served alongside Thomas Mann Randolph in the 1788 session as well as the 1787 session alongside Thomas Underwood, but this man definitely served alongside Underwood in the 1789 session, and later William Randolph Fleming, Thomas Royster and Thomas Miller. In 1802 Guerrant refused the federal office of becoming Richmond's postmaster offered by President Thomas Jefferson, in order to continue his state job on the Executive Council. Some consider him to have acted as a lieutenant governor of Virginia in 1803 and 1805, because his seniority led to the presidency of the Virginia Council of State (the small executive branch of state government at the time), although the office of lieutenant governor was first created by the Virginia Constitution adopted in 1851.

== Personal life ==
In 1782 Guerrant married Mary Heath Povall. The couple had 5 sons and 5 daughters.

== Death and legacy ==
Guerrant died in December 1813, about 2 years after his father, and was presumably buried at the Guerrant family cemetery in Goochland County. His lawyer grandson (via his daughter Winifred), Anthony Martin Branch fought for the Confederacy and became a Texas Congressman. Several subsequent military officers shared this man's name, as did another Goochland County John Guerrant who served in both houses of the Virginia General Assembly in the 1840s, as well as Virginia legislators John R. Guerrant of Franklin County and John W. Guerrant of Caroline County (each of the latter only serving one term).
