= Spencer Roane =

American judge

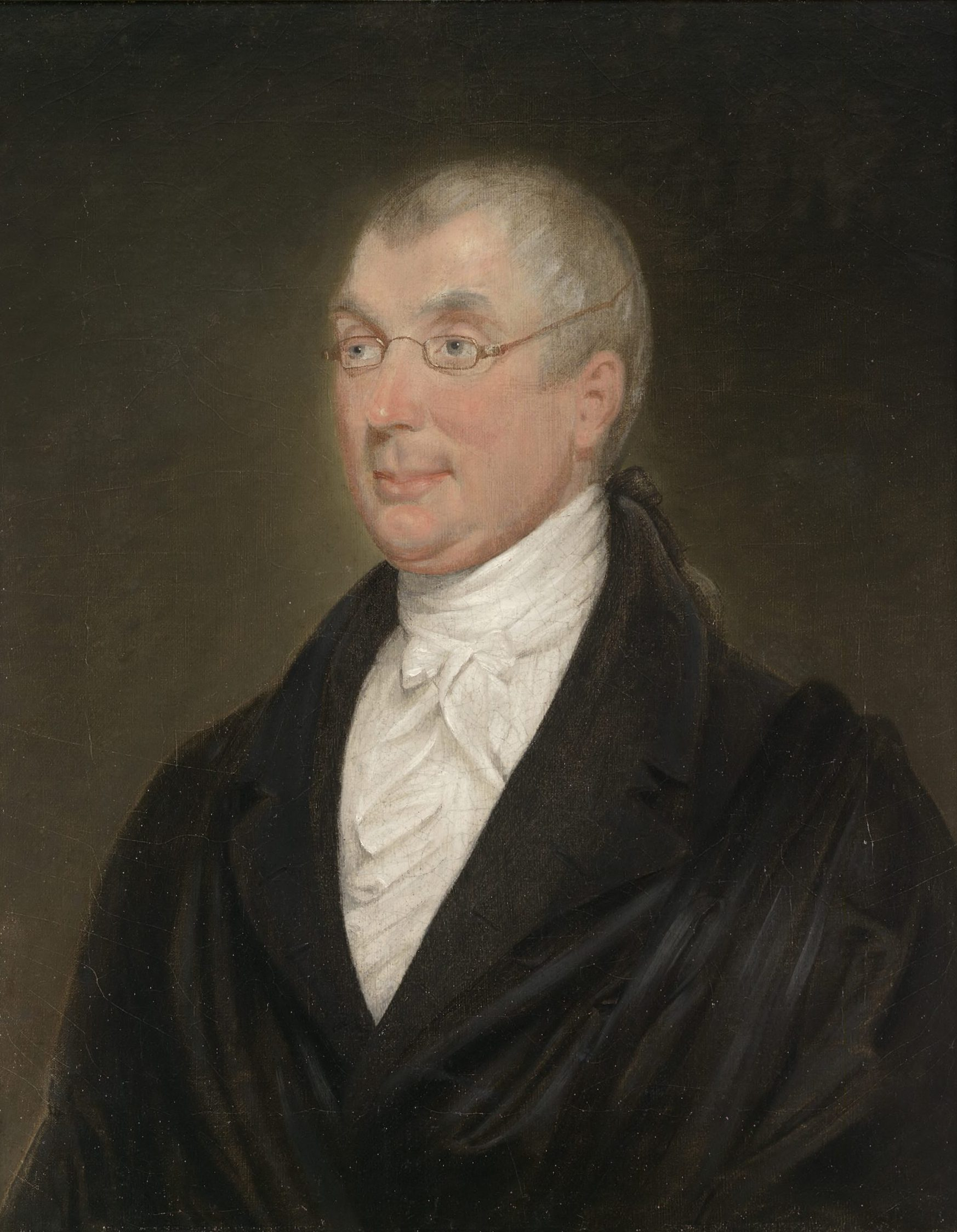
- Portrait by Cephas Thompson, c. 1809

Judge of the Virginia Supreme Court of Appeals
- In office April 13, 1795 – September 4, 1822

Personal details
- Born: April 4, 1762 Essex County, Virginia, US
- Died: September 4, 1822 (aged 60) Bath County, Virginia, US
- Spouse: Anne Henry
- Children: William H. Roane, Fayette Roane
- Education: College of William and Mary
- Occupation: Lawyer, politician, judge

Spencer Roane (April 4, 1762 – September 4, 1822) was a Virginia lawyer, politician and jurist. He served in the Virginia House of Delegates for six years and a year in the Commonwealth's small executive branch (Council of State). The majority of his public career was as a judge, first of the General Court and later (for 27 years) on the Court of Appeals (which later became the Supreme Court of Virginia).

== Early life and education ==
Roane was born in Tappahannock on April 4, 1762. His grandfather, William Roane, of Scots-Irish descent, had emigrated from Ireland like his three brothers circa 1741 to Gloucester County, Virginia, and married a local woman, with whom he had six children. The family moved slightly inland to Tappahannock in what was then Rappahannock County (but became Essex County in 1692) and prospered. Spencer's father William Roane Jr. (who owned plantations in Essex County as well as nearby King and Queen County) served in the House of Burgesses from 1769 until the American Revolutionary War, as the prosecutor (deputy King's attorney) for Essex County, and as a colonel of the county militia during the American Revolutionary War. As discussed further below, William Roane Jr. married Judith Ball, who gave birth to two son. The eldest, Thomas Roane, who would inherit properties as well as represented King and Queen County in the Virginia House of Delegates many times after that conflict). This boy, Spencer, was named after a maternal relation.

As customary for his class, Spencer Roane received his initial schooling at home, under a Scottish tutor named Bradfute. He then entered the College of William and Mary aged 14, to study law under the tutelage of George Wythe, from whom he gained great appreciation of Edward Coke and the English system of property rights, as well as constitutional law, but disliked studying equity (for which Wythe later became renowned). Roane also became a member of the relatively new Phi Beta Kappa Society, then a literary and oratory association, along with future U.S. Supreme Court justices Bushrod Washington and John Marshall. After graduating in January, 1780, as the college temporarily closed so its buildings could house French and American soldiers during the final Yorktown campaign of the American Revolutionary War, Roane traveled to Philadelphia for two years of additional legal studies in the then-nation's capitol.

== Law and politics ==
After Roane returned to Virginia, he read law under John Warden. After examination by Henry Tazewell and John Taylor of Caroline, Roane was admitted to the Virginia bar in 1782, at age 20.

Both Spencer Roane and his former schoolmate John Marshall entered politics soon after beginning their legal careers, and each won election to the Virginia House of Delegates from different districts in 1783. Virginia law permitted legislators to continue private legal practices, and Roane did so. That year Tappahannock citizens had tarred and feathered merchant Joseph Williamson, a loyalist who had returned to the town several years after helping the British bring ships up the Rappahannock River and burn the town. One of Roane's first legislative proposals was a petition asking that charges against his constituents be dismissed because the peace treaty with Britain had been signed in the fall, months after the incident.

Roane was a Presbyterian, not a member of the formally established Episcopal Church, and religious freedom for Baptists and Presbyterians was a hot topic during legislative sessions of the new Commonwealth. Virginia's legislators had passed laws mandating religious toleration, and abolishing compulsory church tithes, in December 1776. In 1784 Virginia's legislators allowed incorporation of the Episcopal Church, as well as vested church property in ministers and vestries, subject to triennial inventory reports to county courts. Despite the urging of prominent Episcopalians Patrick Henry, John Marshall, Edmond Randolph and Richard Henry Lee, legislators refused to assess taxes to support Christian religion or collective worship. Roane had opposed both on religious establishment ground, although at the session's end Roane voted to allow incorporation of all societies of Christian religion. Moreover, following the lead of Jefferson and Madison (as well as young Roane), Virginia's legislators passed a law for the Establishment of Religious Freedom in 1785.

In November 1784, fellow legislators selected Roane to serve a one-year term on the Virginia Council of State. Roane thus helped advise Governor Patrick Henry during the year that began in May, 1785. His only recorded dissent concerned an attempted removal of a justice of the peace for misconduct, which Roane thought interfered with the separation of powers. After his resignation, Roane was elected to the Virginia Senate to represent the counties of Essex, King and Queen and King William. In 1788, he was a candidate for Virginia's 7th congressional district, losing to John Page.

During the tumultuous debate concerning ratification of the federal Constitution in 1787, Roane advocated ratification, on the condition of adding a bill of rights because the document as drafted did not clarify powers reserved to the states and the people.

Although Roane began his judicial career in 1789, a year after the death of his father, as discussed below, he did not abandon his interest in politics. In 1804, Roane persuaded his schoolteacher cousin Thomas Ritchie, to establish the Richmond Enquirer as an intellectual counterweight to the Richmond Recorder (which supported the Federalists). The Enquirer supported the Democratic-Republican Party of Thomas Jefferson and others. Roane, Ritchie and Dr. John Brockenbrough—all from distinguished families of Essex County—became known as the Essex Junto because of their political power in county courts throughout the Commonwealth and the officeholders dependent on them. John Randolph of Roanoke, John Taylor of Caroline County, Andrew Stevenson and Benjamin Watkins Leigh also later came to be characterized as members of what was also called the Richmond junto.

In fact, some considered Roane the leader of the state's Republican party, and he participated in various activities with Thomas Jefferson, including selecting the site for the University of Virginia.

== Judicial career ==
In 1789, fellow legislators appointed Spencer Roane, then 27 years old, a judge of the General Court, which had been reorganized as a trial court in 1777 and 1788. While on the General Court (where he continued until 1794), Roane declared a legislative act unconstitutional for interfering with judicial independence in Kamper v. Hawkins, 1 Virginia Cases 35-56 (Va.1789-1814) (concerning the merger of the Chancery and General Courts). The Court of Appeals upheld that decision, although the exact date is uncertain.

In 1794, Roane resigned from the General Court in order to accept the legislature's appointment as a judge of the Court of Appeals, where he succeeded his former examiner Henry Tazewell, who had become a United States Senator. The thirty-two-year-old Roane then sold his Mahockney Plantation and moved to Richmond. All the other members of that appellate court had begun practicing law before his birth. Roane sought the guidance of distinguished judge Edmund Pendleton, and on the latter's death in 1803, Roane became that high court's most influential judge, and remained on that bench until his death on September 4, 1822.

Roane gained reputations for advocating States' Rights, as well as for opposing U.S. Supreme Court Chief Justice John Marshall. This disagreement was partly political, because President John Adams appointed Marshall after losing the contested election, and President-elect Thomas Jefferson was rumored to favor Roane for the position. But their political divergence began years earlier, when Marshall agreed to represent abolition advocate Pleasants, the executor of Quaker merchant who sought to free slaves pursuant to his father's will, although such a provision had been illegal when drafted, as pointed out by other heirs who sought to have enslaved property. Roane's opinion in Pleasants v. Pleasants allowed the executor to free the slaves, but reinforced the legal basis for the "peculiar institution."

In 1815, Roane defied the U.S. Supreme Court's decision in Martin v. Hunter's Lessee, which he feared marked a drift toward abolition. In 1819, Roane editorialized (under the pen names "Hampden" and "Amphictyon") against Marshall and the U.S. Supreme Court's decision in McCulloch v. Maryland.

When in 1820, Marshall wrote for the Supreme Court in Cohens v. Virginia, on its face simply concerning the sale of lottery tickets, but which also tested Federal jurisdiction over transactions completed entirely within a single state, Roane (as "Algernon Sidney") criticized the decision as the "zenith of despotic power" and said it "negatives the idea that the states have a real existence." Roane had become the judicial voice of opponents of the National Bank, tariffs, and government funded internal improvements. He believed that the federal courts could not entertain lawsuits against states without their consent under tenth and eleventh amendments to the US Constitution, and wrote several opinions foreshadowing the Nullification Crisis.

Twice in his lifetime, Judge Roane was appointed to committees to revise Virginia's laws, including the slave codes. Some of the correspondence between Jefferson and Roane remains, although Roane reportedly destroyed many papers before his death.

== Slavery ==
Roane owned slaves, as had his parents and grandparents. He bought a 620-acre plantation of his own, Spring Garden, in Hanover County in 1802, added another 97 acres three years later, and in 1809 and 1810 acquired a neighboring plantation of 1029 acres known as New Castle or Neck Plantation, so by the census of that year owned 39 slaves and 15 horses and mules.

== Marriage and family relationships ==
Spencer Roane was named for Col. Nicholas Spencer, acting Governor of the state of Virginia in 1683–1684. Although Roane wasn't descended from Spencer, he was a family relation. (Col. John Mottrom, first member of the Virginia House of Burgesses for Northumberland County, had a son John Mottrom, who in turn had a son named Spencer Mottrom, named for Gov. Nicholas Spencer, who was married to John Mottrom Jr.'s sister. Capt. Spencer Mottrom's daughter Mary, in turn, was married to Joseph Ball, whose son Spencer Ball had a son Spencer Mottrom Ball, whose daughter Judith married William Roane and bore the future judge Spencer.)

The Roane family continued its political activity and distinction after William Roane died in 1788: his elder brother Thomas was elected to the Virginia senate in the 1790s; and Spencer Roane's elder brother, another Thomas, was elected to the House of Delegates for King and Queen County. Their cousins included Thomas Ritchie, editor of the Richmond Enquirer, and Dr. John Brockenbrough, president of the Bank of Virginia.

In 1787 Spencer Roane married Anne Henry (1767-1799), second daughter and fourth child of Patrick Henry, who bore four sons and three daughters before her death. Their eldest son, William H. Roane, also became a lawyer and legislator, and twice served on the Executive Council. He represented Henrico County in the state legislature, the Richmond area as a U.S. Representative (1815-1817), and Virginia as a United States Senator (1837–1841). Both sons Patrick Henry Roane (1789–1791, and 1793–1813) and Fayette Roane (1792-1819) and daughter Elizabeth Roane (1798-1799) predeceased their father, and daughters Anne and Julia disappeared from the historical record, although Spencer's last will mentioned daughter Eliza as well as son William. Roane remarried, to Elizabeth Hoskins, who survived him, but bore no children.

== Death and legacy ==
Spencer Roane became ill in March, 1822 and, realizing that his "indisposition" was not going away, wrote his last will and testament, as well as traveled to hot springs in Bath, Virginia, where he spent the summer trying to regain his health. There he died on September 4, 1822.

Roane County, West Virginia and Spencer, the county seat, are both named for Judge Roane. (Roane County, Tennessee, is named for a cousin, Archibald Roane.)

== See also ==
- Democratic-Republican Party
