= Richmond Whig =

Newspaper published in Richmond, Virginia

The Richmond Whig, initially published as a semiweekly paper under the title the Constitutional Whig, was a newspaper published in Richmond, Virginia, between 1824 and 1888.The Whig had numerous editions and title changes throughout its publication history.

== Editions and titles ==
The paper had a variety of titles, and it is not easy to determine which title was published in which years: Constitutional Whig, Daily Richmond Whig, Daily Richmond Whig and Public Advertiser, Evening Whig, Richmond Daily Whig, Richmond Weekly Whig, Richmond Whig & Commercial Journal, Richmond Whig & Public Advertiser.

== History ==
As a Whig paper, the news sheet supported John Bell in the election of 1860 and opposed secession, even after Abraham Lincoln won in 1860 and several Southern states began to secede. Once the Civil War began in April 1861, and Virginia seceded and joined the Confederacy, the Whig supported the CSA throughout the war. Despite its pro-Confederate posture, it was a vocal opponent of the Davis Administration throughout the conflict. After Union troops entered Richmond on April 3, 1865 it pointed out that when the war began, the last place in Richmond where "the Star-Spangled Banner" still flew was on the Whig building, and that the Confederate flag never flew over it. When the Union flag had to come down it was replaced with a new Virginia state flag, the Commonwealth's first flag.

In the second issue after republication began, under the signature "Patriot" it published its view of the war:

THE DUTIES OF THE HOUR
OUR DELIVERANCE FROM TYRANNY.

Fellow citizens, no community has greater cause of rejoicing than ours, notwithstanding the destitution and distress which prevail. Thank God! we are at last delivered from the selfish, ambitious and designing devils incarnate who brought this ruinous and fratricidal war upon the country. We have suffered, God only knows now much, by this war. Four long years of painful anxiety, of hunger, want and oppression, have passed away, and now we are free again! God be praised!

It also pointed out that it was "The God of Justice works by means, and perhaps there can be no more suggestive instance of his visitation than a corps of colored troops, under the gallant [Godfrey] Weitzel, was the first to plant the flag of freedom over the Rebel Capital."
