= Eppington =

Historic house in Virginia, United States

- U.S. National Register of Historic Places
- Virginia Landmarks Register
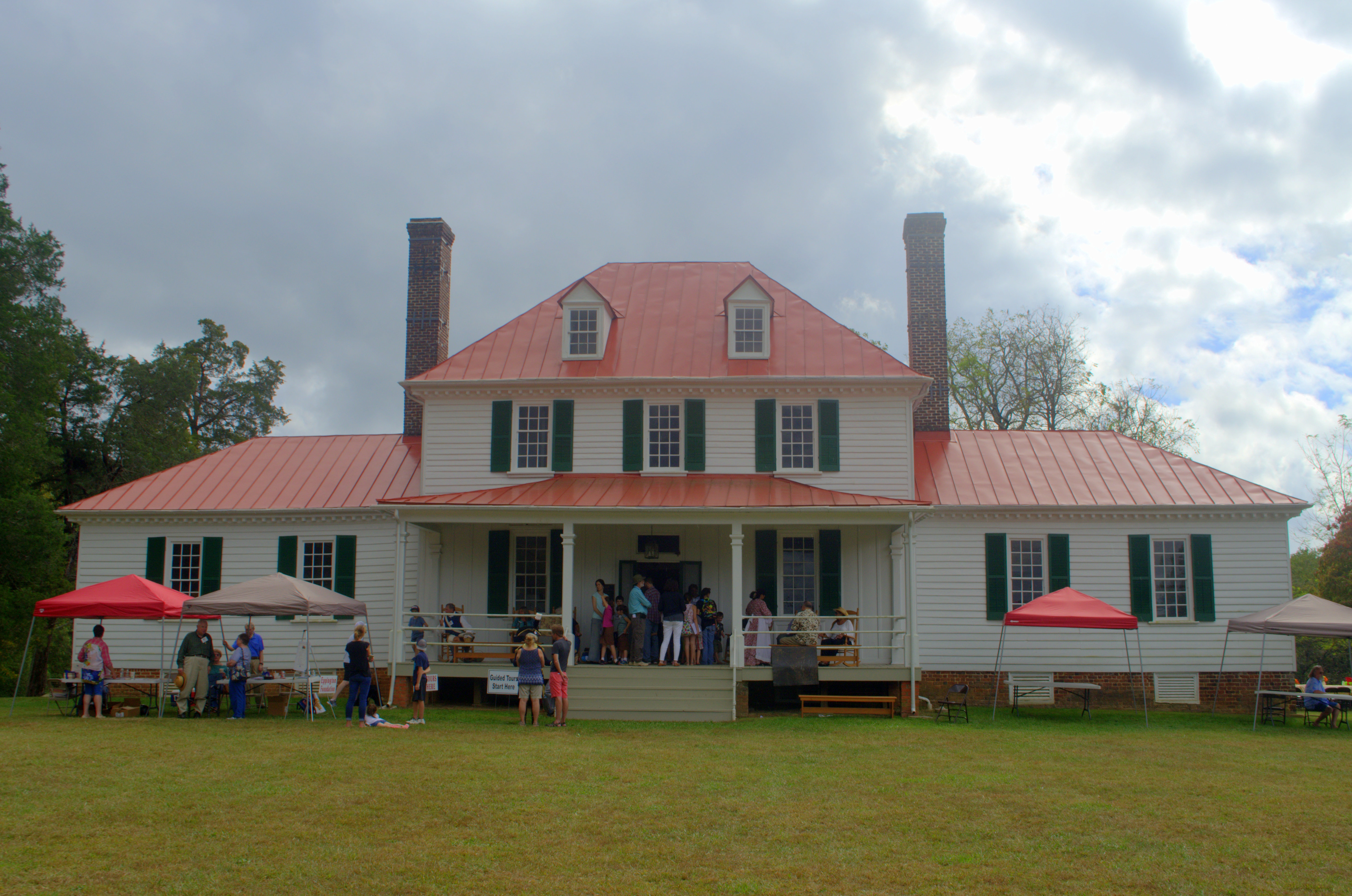
- Front of the house, pictured in 2017

- Location within Virginia Location within the United States
- Location: South of the junction of VA 621 and 602, near Winterpock, Virginia
- Coordinates: 37°17′45″N 77°43′37″W
- Area: 1,750 acres (710 ha)
- Built: c. 1768
- Architectural style: Georgian
- NRHP reference No.: 69000230
- VLR No.: 020-0025

Significant dates
- Added to NRHP: November 12, 1969
- Designated VLR: September 9, 1969

Eppington is a historic plantation house located near Winterpock, Chesterfield County, Virginia. It was built about 1768, and consists of a three-bay, 2 1/2-story, central block with hipped roof, dormers, modillion cornice, and flanking one-story wings in the Georgian style. It has a later two-story rear ell. It features two tall exterior end chimneys which rise from the roof of the wings. It was listed on the National Register of Historic Places in 1969.

== History ==
=== The Eppeses and Jeffersons ===
Its builder, Francis Eppes, was brother-in-law and first cousin of Martha Jefferson (1748–1782), the wife of Thomas Jefferson. After her death, Eppes and his wife Elizabeth (Martha Jefferson's half-sister) raised Jefferson's two younger daughters, Mary and Lucy Elizabeth, while their father was Minister to France. Charles Eppes sent samples of American trees, including Bald Cypress, Eastern Red Cedar, southern magnolia and Wax-myrtle as well as hams from Monticello to Thomas Jefferson in France at Thomas Jefferson's request. Lucy Elizabeth died in 1784 aged two and was buried at Eppington. Mary (Polly) Jefferson (1778–1804), married in 1797 her cousin, John Wayles Eppes (1772–1823) and spent much of her time at Eppington. The Eppeses own daughters studied natural and agricultural sciences, noting what times of year crops came in as well as when Eastern whip-poor-wills arrived and started singing.

In 1790, Charles Eppes had 124 slaves and 2 white overseers living on Eppington. The yard near the house was a service yard, an area for the house slaves to do work such as smoking country ham, milking cows, churning butter and drawing water from a well. A fence line appears to have kept the field slaves separate from house slaves. The service yard was hidden from visitors with tended gardens, orchards and lawns. The value of the slave's labor added greatly to the wealth of the plantation until the American Civil War. As early as 1806, a school building was on the property. Later, by the mid-eighteen hundreds, the building was converted into a kitchen to replace a previous building that had been the kitchen.

=== Archibald Thweatt ===
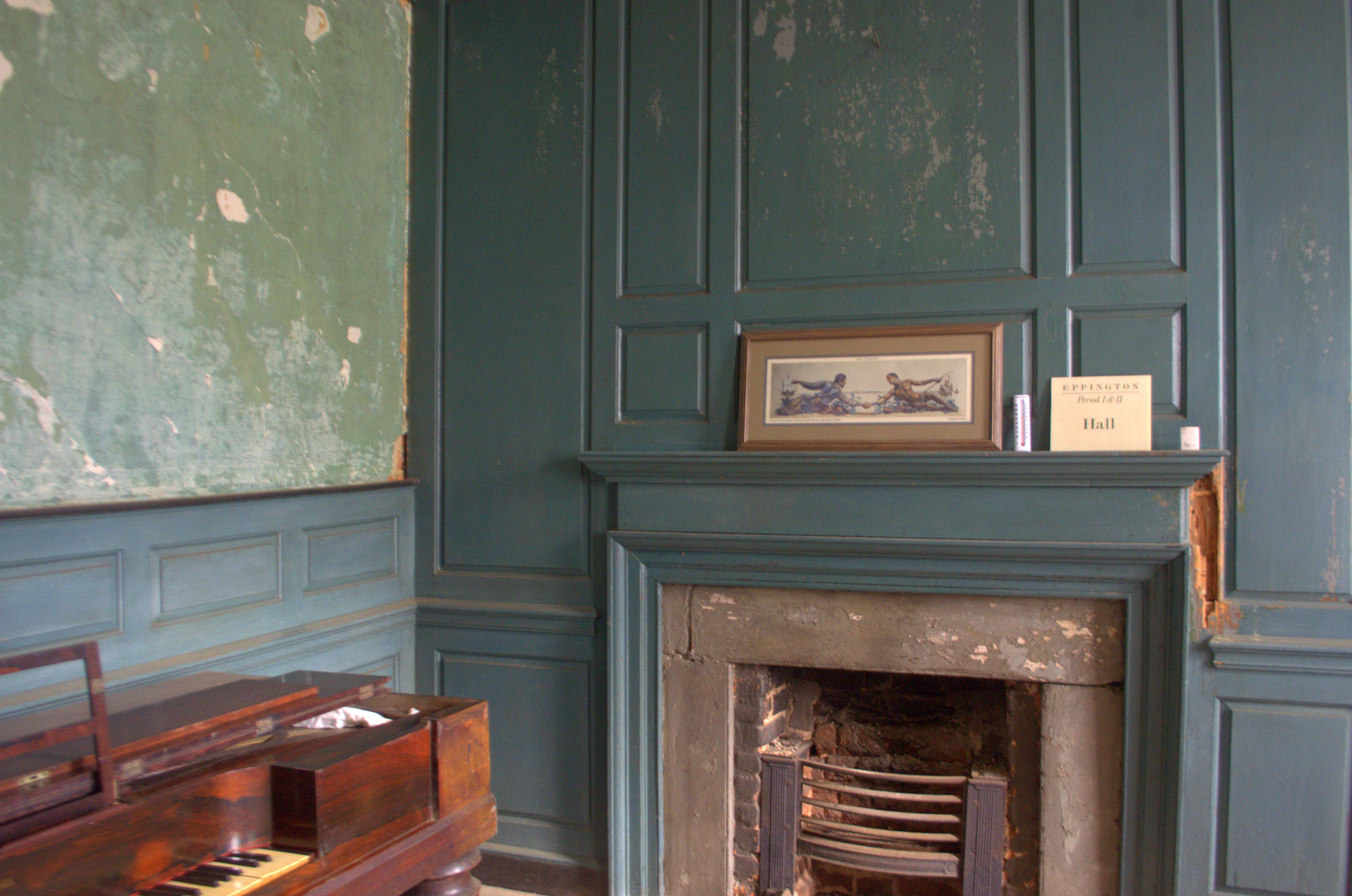
Simple architrave framing with a plain frieze and shelf above on the mantle. The off-center position of the fireplace is shown with the different widths of the side panels.

Archibald Thweatt acquired Eppington over several purchases starting in December 1812. Epps Falls, at Eppington, were deemed dangerous for passing boats by the Virginia General Assembly. The General Assembly, in 1819, gave Archibald Thweatt, owner of Eppington, compensation from any damages but allowed the Upper Appomattox Canal company to build a dam and locks around the falls. Archibald Thweatt and his heirs were also given leave to build a grist mill on the dam. Archibald Thweatt raised Merino wool. Also, in 1819, he made a land arrangement which was critical to keep open the right of way road from Richmond to Petersburg.

When the Upper Appomattox Canal Navigation System was complete, neighboring farmers could ship farm produce from the docks at Eppington. There were large loading facilities. When coal was first mined at the Clover Hill Pits, in 1837, it was taken by mule, later by rail, to the docks at Epps Falls. A boat that could carry seven tons of coal, made a four-day round trip to Petersburg for two dollars and thirty eight cents. Rail Service to the docks was discontinued when the Clover Hill Railroad was built to the James River. But it was later added back when the successor, the Brighthope Railway was expanded in 1881.

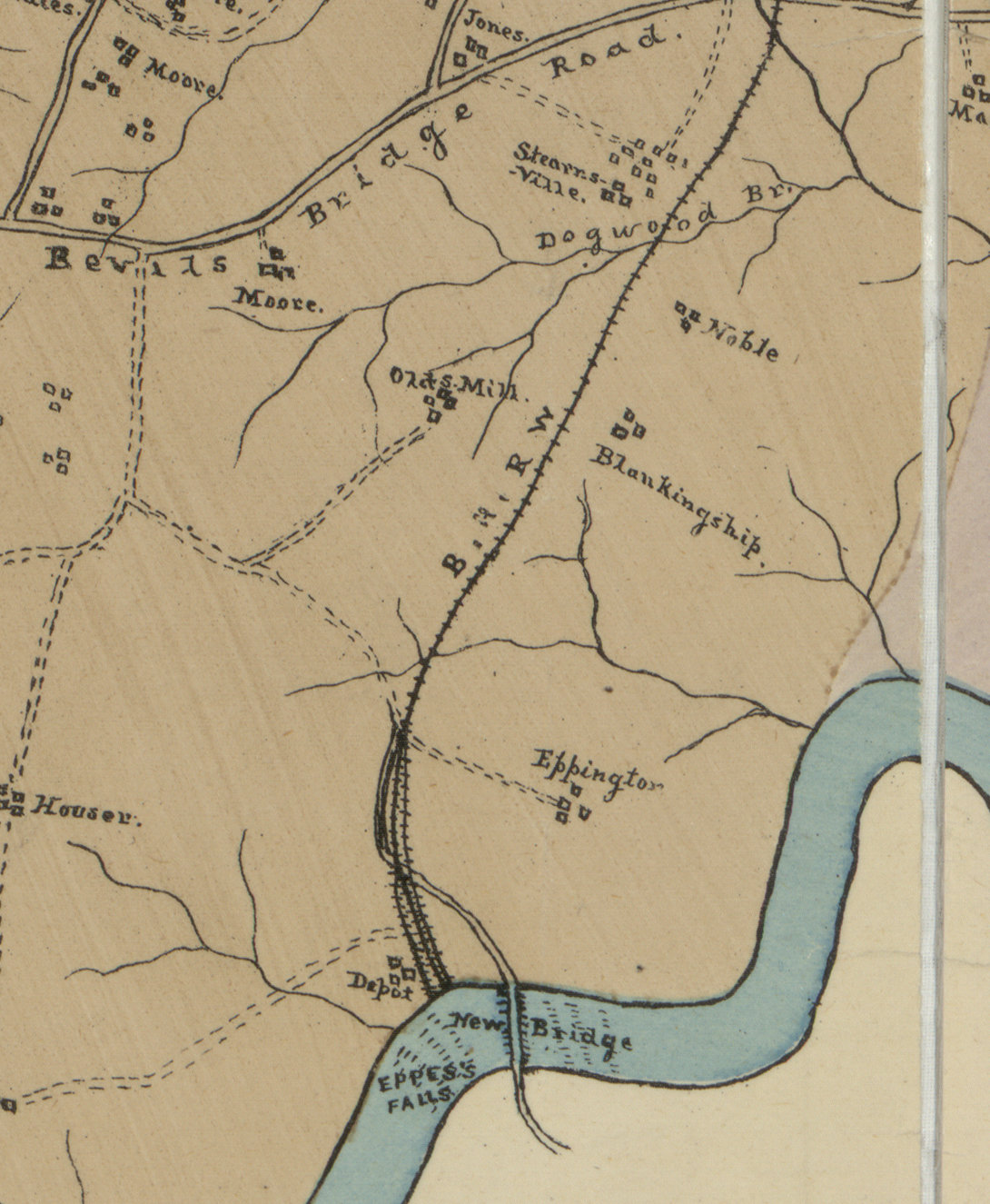
Map of Chesterfield County, Virginia 1888, cropped to show Eppington Plantation and the surrounding areas. Boat, train and carriage traffic came to the front of the plantation.
