= National Register of Historic Places listings in Hopewell, Virginia =

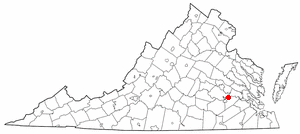
Location of Hopewell in Virginia

This is a list of the National Register of Historic Places listings in Hopewell, Virginia.

This is intended to be a complete list of the properties and districts on the National Register of Historic Places in the independent city of Hopewell, Virginia, United States. The locations of National Register properties and districts for which the latitude and longitude coordinates are included below, may be seen in an online map.

There are 9 properties and districts listed on the National Register in the city.

This National Park Service list is complete through NPS recent listings posted February 6, 2026.

== Current listings ==
	Name on the Register	Image	Date listed	Location	Description
1	Appomattox Manor	Appomattox Manor	October 1, 1969 (#69000015)	Cedar Lane at the confluence of the James and Appomattox Rivers; 37°19′01″N 77°16′38″W	
2	Beacon Theatre	Beacon Theatre	November 22, 2000 (#00001434)	401 N. Main St. 37°18′17″N 77°17′14″W	
3	City Point Historic District	City Point Historic District	October 15, 1979 (#79000248)	Off State Routes 10/156; 37°18′54″N 77°16′34″W	
4	City Point National Cemetery	City Point National Cemetery	August 10, 1995 (#95000923)	Junction of 10th Ave. and Davis St. 37°18′19″N 77°17′52″W	
5	Downtown Hopewell Historic District	Downtown Hopewell Historic District	September 14, 2002 (#02000977)	E. Broadway Ave., E. City Point R., and E. Cawson, Hopewell, N. Main, and E. Poythress Sts. 37°18′11″N 77°17′18″W	Original boundary: Main St., Appomattox St., Hopewell St., and East Broadway, adjusted on May 28, 2013 to add 10 buildings and remove one (the Patrick Copeland Elementary School); adjusted again on August 24, 2015 and April 26, 2018.
6	Hopewell High School Complex	Hopewell High School Complex	September 16, 2009 (#09000729)	1201 City Point Rd. 37°18′04″N 77°17′52″W	
7	Hopewell Municipal Building	Hopewell Municipal Building	May 8, 1998 (#98000451)	300 Main St. 37°18′15″N 77°17′16″W	
8	Kippax Plantation Archeological Site	Kippax Plantation Archeological Site	August 9, 2007 (#07000799)	999 Bland Ave. 37°16′48″N 77°19′05″W	
9	Weston Manor	Weston Manor	April 13, 1972 (#72001505)	Off State Route 10 on the southern bank of the Appomattox River; 37°18′33″N 77°18′14″W	

== See also ==
- List of National Historic Landmarks in Virginia
- National Register of Historic Places listings in Virginia
- National Register of Historic Places listings in Charles City County, Virginia
- National Register of Historic Places listings in Prince George County, Virginia
