= Downtown Hopewell Historic District =

Historic district in Virginia, United States

- U.S. National Register of Historic Places
- U.S. Historic district
- Virginia Landmarks Register
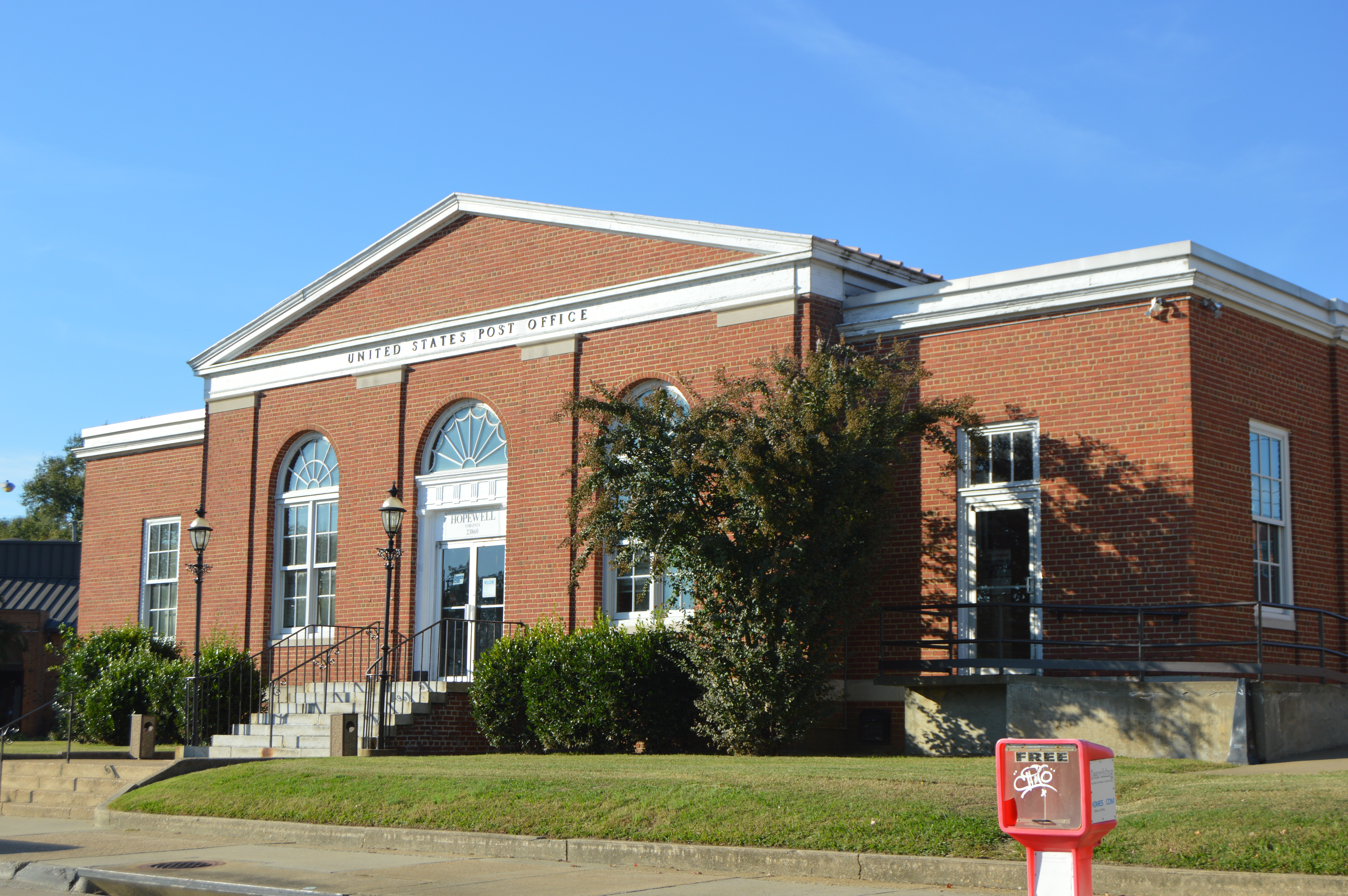
- Post office on Poythress Street

- Location within Virginia Location within the United States
- Location: Boundary includes Main St., Appomattox St., Hopewell St., and East Broadway, Hopewell, Virginia
- Coordinates: 37°18′23″N 77°17′14″W
- Area: 8.5 acres (3.4 ha)
- Built: 1915
- Architect: Bishop, Fred A.; Edwards, Osbert L.
- Architectural style: Late 19th And 20th Century Revivals, Art Deco
- NRHP reference No.: 02000977 (original); 13000337 (increase 1); 15000549 (increase 2); 100002375 (increase 3)
- VLR No.: 116-5031

Significant dates
- Added to NRHP: September 14, 2002
- Boundary increase: April 26, 2018
- Designated VLR: June 12, 2002

Downtown Hopewell Historic District is a national historic district located at Hopewell, Virginia. The district encompasses 38 contributing buildings in the central business district of Hopwell. The district primarily includes masonry buildings, largely built after a devastating fire in 1915. The scale is low with most buildings only two stories in height with decorative brick cornices and Art Deco features. Notable buildings include the Wells Building, Larkin Building (1916), Randolph Hotel (1927), former National Bank of Hopewell (1916), D. L. Elder Bank (1929), and First Federal Savings and Loan building (1951). Located in the district and separately listed are the Hopewell Municipal Building and Beacon Theatre.

It was listed on the National Register of Historic Places in 2002, with several subsequent boundary increases.
