= Hopewell High School Complex =

Historic building in Virginia, US

- U.S. National Register of Historic Places
- Virginia Landmarks Register
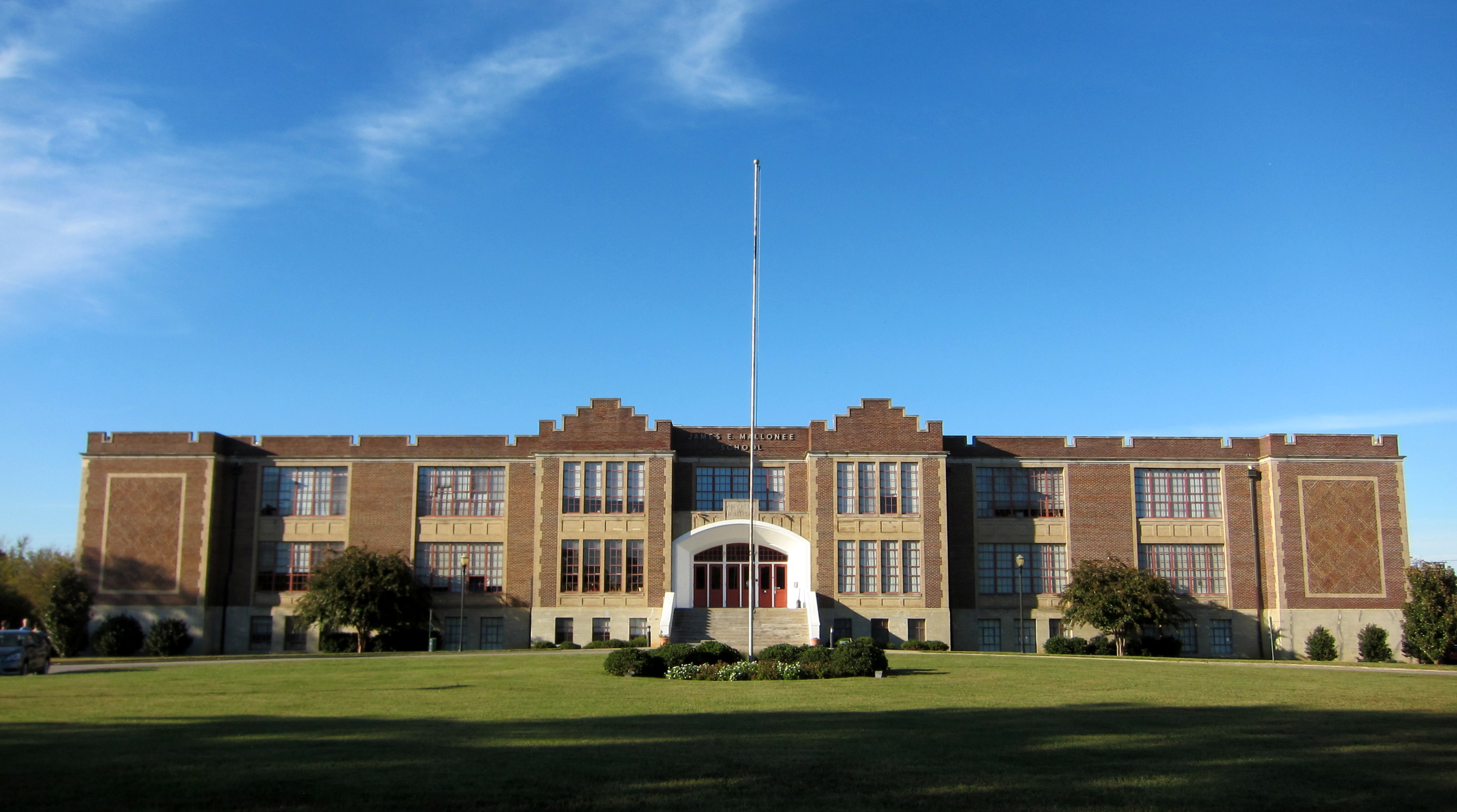
- Hopewell High School, now known as Hopewell Lofts, in 2016

- Location within Virginia Location within the United States
- Location: 1201 City Point Road, Hopewell, Virginia
- Coordinates: 37°18′02″N 77°17′48″W
- Area: 11.45 acres (4.63 ha)
- Built: 1925, 1936, 1949, 1959
- Architect: Fred A. Bishop, Carneal & Johnston
- Architectural style: Colonial Revival, International Style, Tudor Revival
- NRHP reference No.: 09000729
- VLR No.: 116-5030

Significant dates
- Added to NRHP: September 16, 2009
- Designated VLR: June 18, 2009

The Hopewell High School Complex, also known as James E. Mallonee Middle School, is a historic former school campus located at 1201 City Point Road in Hopewell, Virginia, United States. Contributing properties in the complex include the original school building, athletic field, club house, concession stand, press box, Home Economics Cottage, gymnasium and Science and Library Building. There are two non-contributing structures on the property.

Built in 1925, the Tudor Revival style school building served white high school students of Hopewell until 1967 when a new racially integrated facility was built and the former high school was converted into a middle school. The building was abandoned in 1988 after students were moved to another location. The athletic field, a project of the Works Progress Administration, is still used by Hopewell High School teams and the local school board offices are housed in the Home Economics Cottage and Science and Library Building.

The complex was listed on the National Register of Historic Places and Virginia Landmarks Register in 2009. The following year, renovation of the school building into loft-style apartments was completed. The building is now known as the Hopewell Lofts.

== History ==
=== School usage ===
Following a devastating fire in 1915 that destroyed much of Hopewell, local citizens rebuilt the town and the local school system established a high school department. There were reportedly 21 students and 4 teachers the first year. During the next few years, classes were held in various locations including an old school building and a local YMCA facility on 3 ½ Avenue. Hopewell High School was formally established in 1921 and served only white students. There were only 11 graduating students in 1922, but the number of enrolled pupils soon increased when Hopewell, City Point, and surrounding villages were annexed and combined into an independent city, Hopewell. An influx of people working at local industrial plants resulted in a sharp increase in the population during the 1920s and plans were made for a new school facility. During the Progressive Era, schools were envisioned as being centers of the community. Virginia State Board of Education officials also sought to replace smaller school buildings with larger, architecturally significant facilities. Hopewell was "developed with the intention of being a comprehensive school with courses as varied as the demand and facilities would permit." Construction began on the new high school building in 1924.

Frederick A. Bishop, a prolific architect and contractor from nearby Richmond, was selected to design the school. His other designs include schools, banks and theaters in the Richmond-Petersburg-Hopewell area and Tidewater region. Bishop's best known work is the Byrd Theatre in Richmond and his other designs in Hopewell include Hopewell City Hall and the Beacon Theatre.

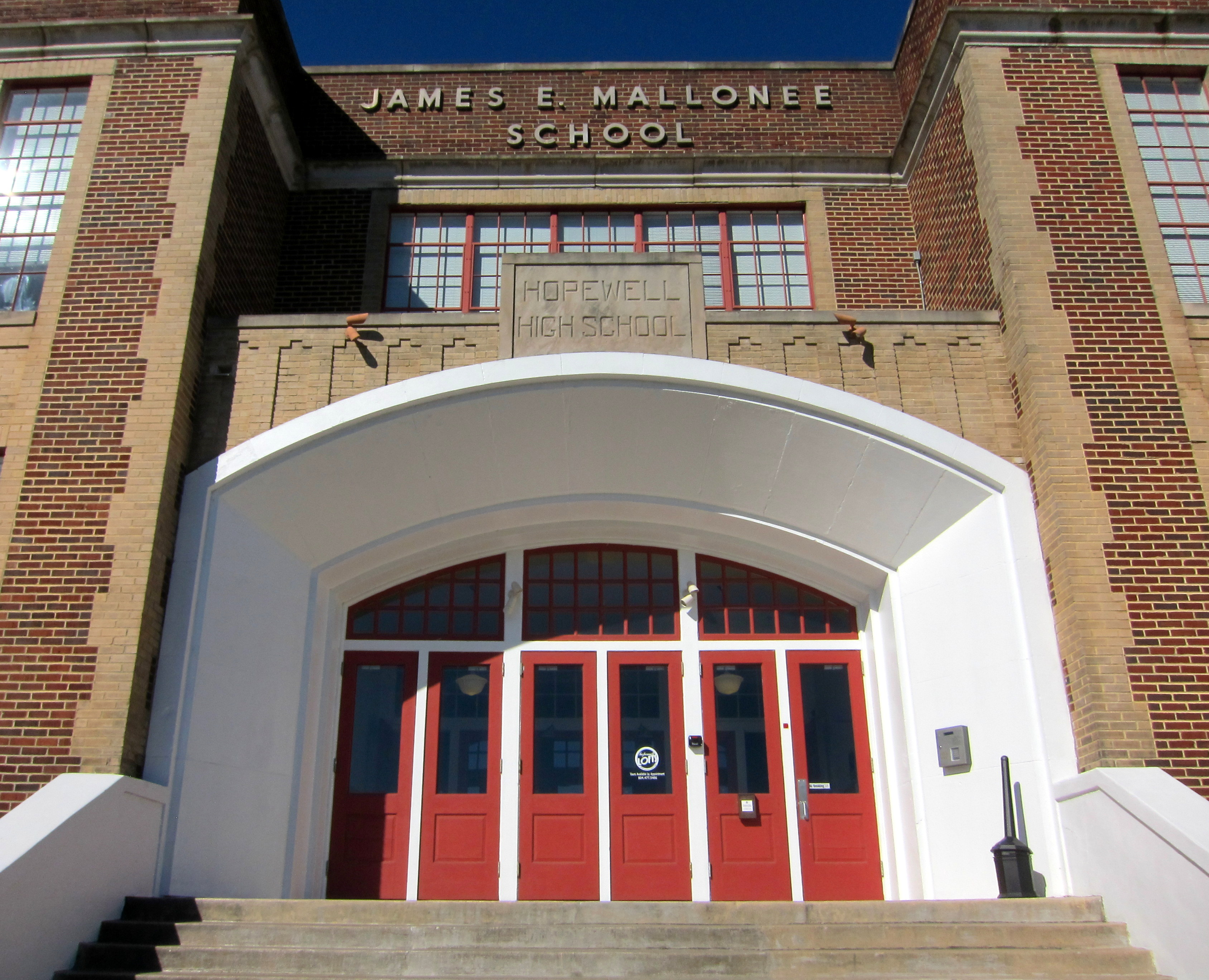
Both school names are above the entrance.

The high school building, which could accommodate 725 students, was completed in the fall of 1925 and following the Thanksgiving holiday, pupils were moved to the new facility. There were 10 teachers for the 281 grades 8-11 students. Because of the school's extra space, over 300 grades 5-7 students were transferred to the new facility. The students in the lower grades were later transferred to other schools when high school enrollment increased in the 1930s.

That decade also saw the expansion of the school complex. A small cottage, located across 12th Avenue, was built for home economics courses. Construction of the athletic field and club house was a project of the Works Progress Administration. In the 1940s, a gymnasium was built beside the cottage and a metal and woodworking shop was added to the rear of the school building. Both projects were designed by Richmond architects and engineers Carneal & Johnson. The firm, along with Richmond architect J. Henley Walker Jr., designed the Science and Library Building, located across 12th Avenue and completed in 1959.

In 1967, construction of a new racially integrated high school at 400 South Mesa Drive was completed and Hopewell High School became the James E. Mallonee Middle School, named in honor of the high school's principal from 1923 until the 1940s. The complex continued to serve as a middle school until 1988 when students were transferred to another facility. Mallonee School was then used as storage space for the Hopewell school system. The city purchased the building from the School Board in 2001 and planned to use it as government office space, but the plans were deemed infeasible.

=== Restoration ===
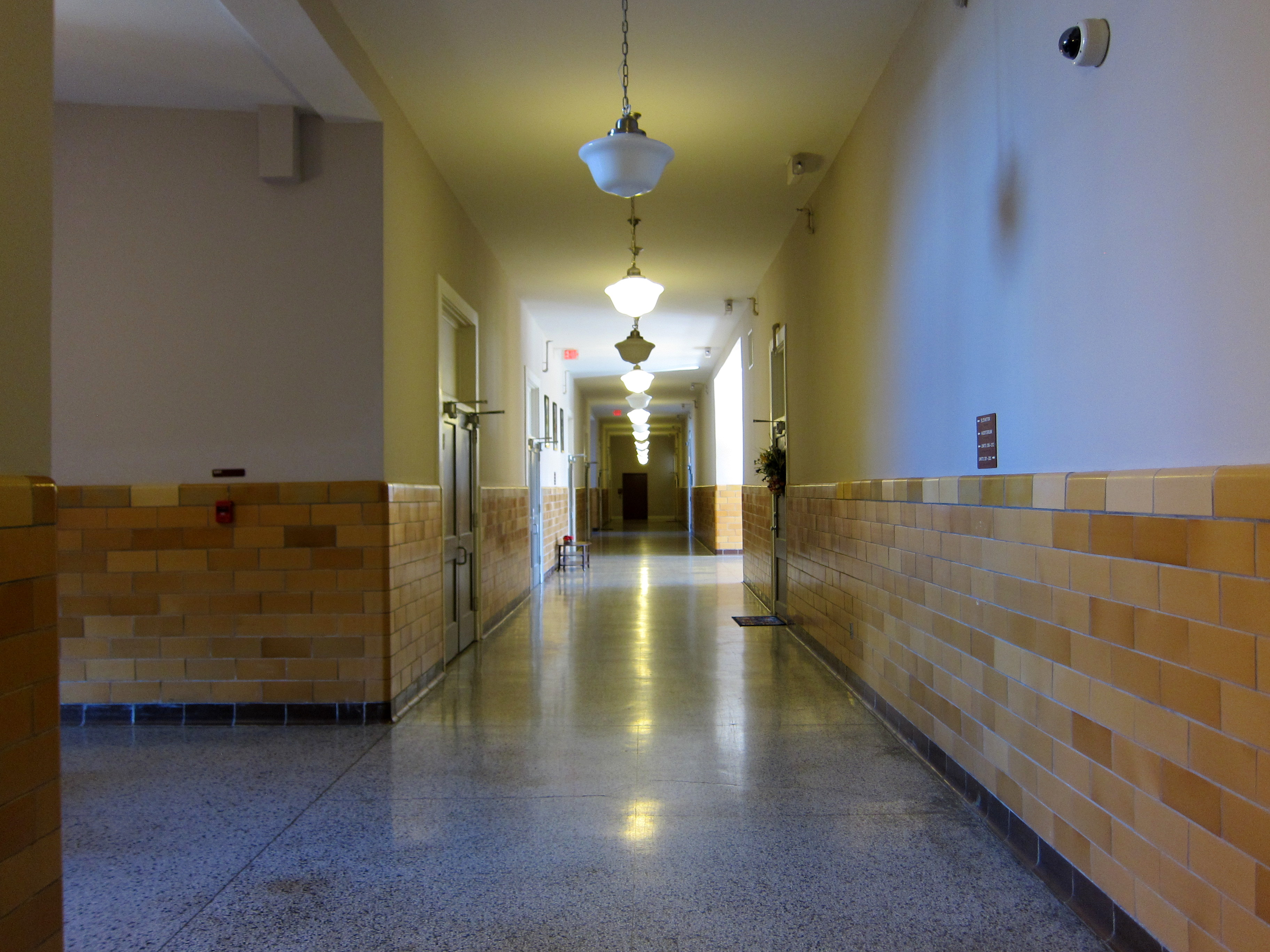
Hopewell Lofts first floor hallway

The school building sat vacant until January 2008 when Hopewell city officials approved plans by Garcia Development, LLC to convert it into 50 loft-style apartments. The co-developer of the project was David McCormack, president of Waukeshaw Development, Inc. The renovation was delayed by 16 months due to the 2008 financial crisis, a fire in April 2008 which damaged the property, and the developers waiting for historic tax credit approval. During this time the school complex was added to the Virginia Landmarks Register on June 18, 2009, and the National Register of Historic Places on September 16, 2009. It was described as a "representative and intact example of an early 20th-century urban school complex" that "retains the integrity of its historic location, association, setting, feeling, design, materials, and workmanship."

The $8 million project, (Note: Multiple news articles, citing the owner, list the cost as $8,000,000. The real estate development firm's website lists it as $6,462,960.) named the Hopewell Lofts, (Note: Sources also use the name "Mallonee Lofts".) was completed in May 2010. The renovation was designed by McEntire Davis Architects and the contractor was Haase, Inc. Many of the 1, 2, and 3 bedroom apartments feature original details such as chalkboards and large windows. Residents living in rear units face the athletic field and can watch football games. The hallways feature the original butterscotch tiles, terrazzo floors and marble staircase. The central auditorium is a public area that can be rented and the back stage has been turned into apartments.

The Home Economics Cottage and the Science and Library Building now serve as offices for the Hopewell School Board. The athletic field continues to be used for the Hopewell High School Blue Devils home football games. The Boys & Girls Club used the gymnasium until 2013 when the after-school program was moved to the Harry E. James Elementary School. The gymnasium began serving as a cold weather shelter for the homeless during the 2014–2015 winter season. In 2016, former NFL players Wali Rainer and Hopewell High School graduate Monsanto Pope joined other professional athletes in urging Hopewell government officials to renovate the gymnasium to reuse as a teen center focusing on tutoring and sports.

== Layout and design ==
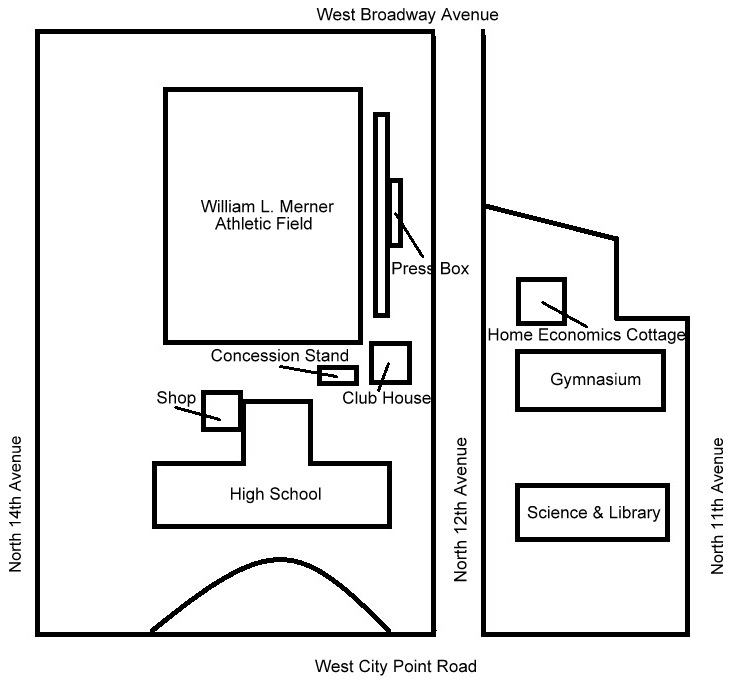
Complex diagram

The Hopewell High School Complex is located on the north side of City Point Road near Hopewell's commercial center. The boundaries of the complex include West Broadway Avenue to the north, North 14th Avenue to the east, West City Point Road to the south and North 11th Avenue to the east. North 12th Avenue divides the complex and the main school building features a circular driveway off of City Point Road. The complex includes eight contributing properties and two non-contributing. The contributing properties, built between 1925 and 1959, include the original school building, athletic field, club house, concession stand, press box, Home Economics Cottage, gymnasium and Science and Library Building. The two non-contributing properties are late 20th-century storage sheds on the west side of the athletic field.

=== Hopewell High School Building ===
The original portion of the school, built in 1925, is a Tudor Revival, two-story, seven-bay brick building with a basement. The arched stone entrance features decorative brick work and quoining. "Hopewell High School" is on a stone panel above the doorway and "James E. Mallonee Middle School" is lettered just below the roofline. There are three sets of doors at the entrance, each featuring glass and wood panels. Above these doors are transoms with divided lights. There are steel sash windows throughout the building with most having 18 divided lights. Many of these feature a hopper mechanism in the bottom portion of the window.

The original layout of the basement included classrooms, labs, the cafeteria and kitchen, offices, locker rooms and a boiler room. The main floor featured classrooms, restrooms, the library, principal's office and superintendent of school's office. The auditorium and maple wood stage is located in the center of the building. The upper portion of the auditorium including the gallery is on the second floor. This floor also featured classrooms, a teacher's lounge and the study hall.

In the rear of the main school building is the two-story shop, a concrete and brick addition built in 1935. It features an interior chimney on the northwest corner. There are two modern doors on the west side of the building and a metal door on the southeast corner. The building originally featured a metal shop, woodworking shop, finishing room, tool and supply rooms, an office and wash room.

=== William L. Merner Athletic Field ===
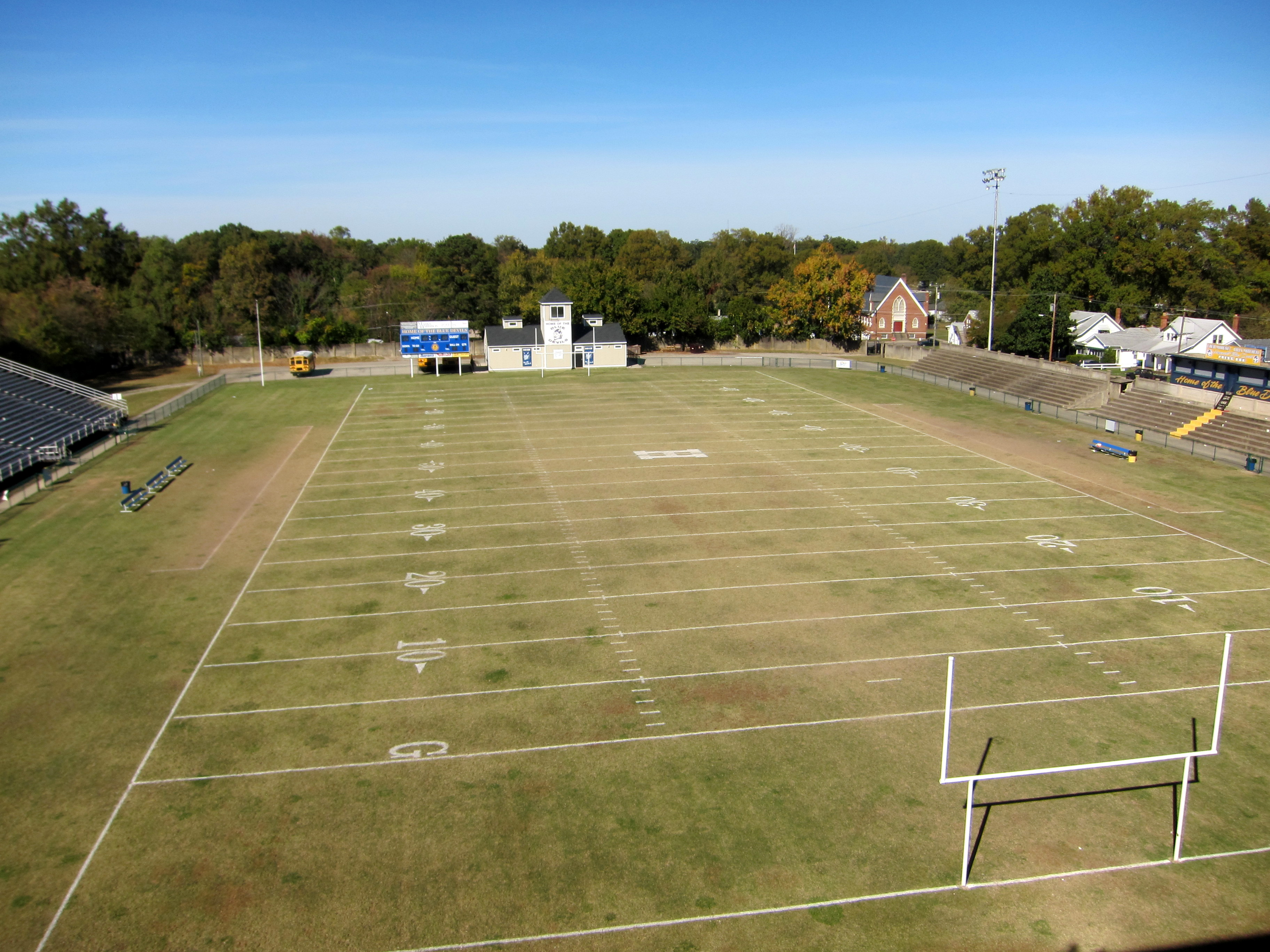
William L. Merner Athletic Field and press box (far right)

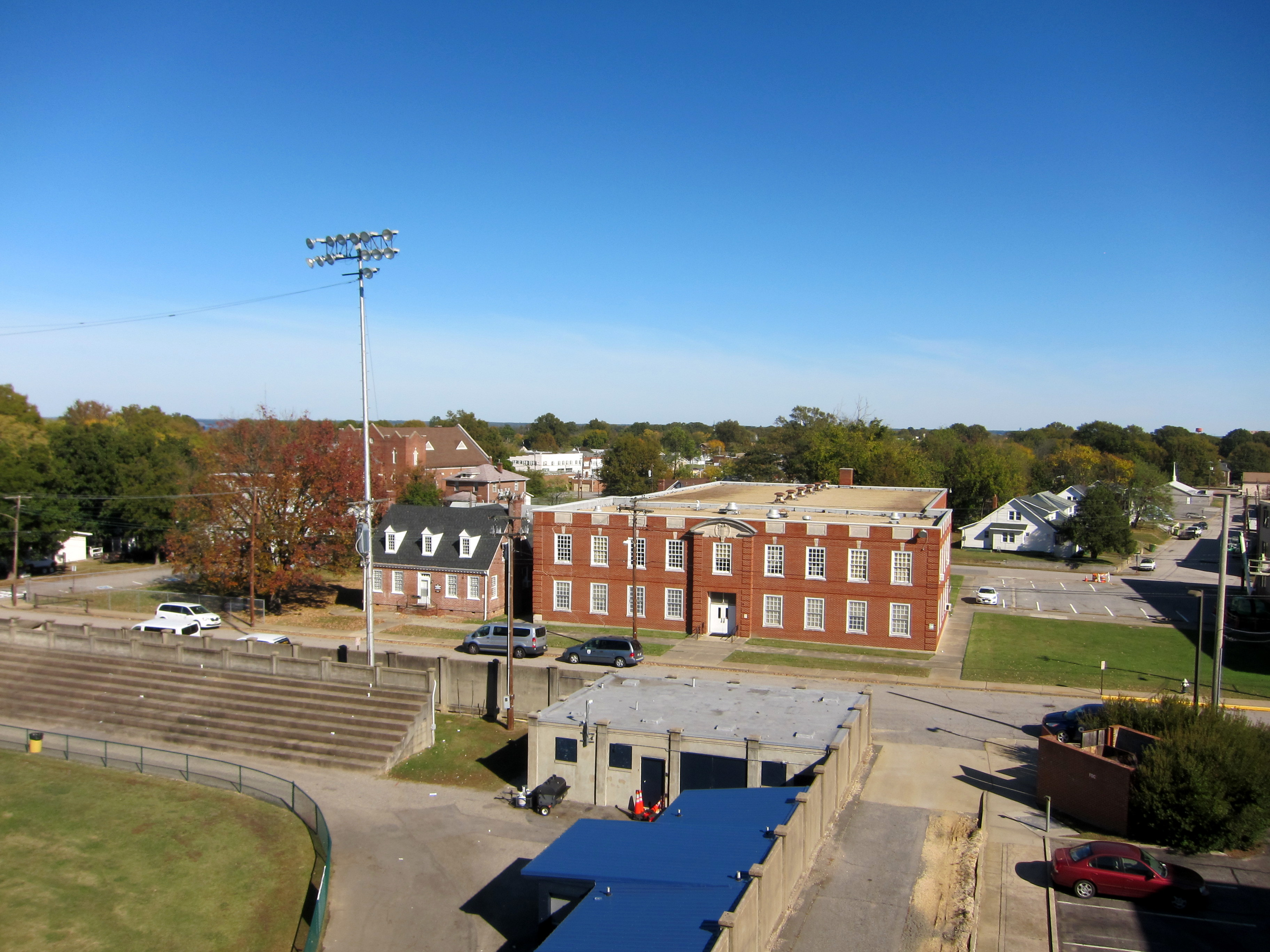
Home Economics Cottage (left), gymnasium (right), club house (foreground), and concession stand (foreground, blue roof)

The athletic field, built in the 1930s as a Works Progress Administration project, is sited on the north side of the complex directly behind the main school building. In 1965, the field was renamed in honor of William "Bill" Merner (1915–1965), a Hopewell High School graduate and Blue Devils football player who later returned to the school and coached the football team from 1949–1958. The field features two goal posts, a metal scoreboard and concrete track and sidewalks. Concrete bleachers, believed to be built in the late 1930s, are on the east side of the field and modern, metal bleachers are on the west side. A concrete wall built in the late 1930s surrounds the perimeter of the field. It features capped pilasters approximately every six feet. A parking area is sited just north of the field.

=== Club house ===
The club house, built in 1936, is located near the athletic field's southeast corner. It is a one-story concrete building with a flat roof that features identical capped pilasters found on the concrete wall surrounding the athletic field. There are six boarded up, square windows and three doors. The only accessible door is on the building's west side. The interior of the building is made up of small rooms that connect to a larger one.

=== Concession stand ===
The concession stand, built sometime between 1936 and 1959, is located just west of the club house. The concrete building features a bump-out with three windows and sliding metal shades. Men's and women's restrooms are located in this building.

=== Press box ===
The press box, built sometime between 1936 and 1959, is located at the top of the athletic field's concrete bleachers. It features many of the same elements as the concession stand. It is made of concrete and has five window openings with sliding metal shades. There is one door that is connected to the bleachers by metal stairs. The metal roof extends over this doorway and the window openings to provide a canopy.

=== Home Economics Cottage ===
The cottage, built in the late 1930s, is a 1 1/2-story Colonial Revival brick building featuring a pair of brick chimneys. It is located across North 12th Avenue, east of the athletic field and beside the gymnasium. Windows on the first floor, which are covered with metal bars, and the three gabled dormers are 6/9 wood sash windows. Others throughout the building are 6/6 sash windows. There is a four-light transom above the solid wood front door.

The interior features many of the cottage's original details including mantels, woodwork and built-in cabinets. There is an arched opening between the former dining and living rooms. A large room, which features the same design and materials as the original portion and is located at the rear of the building, is believed to be a later addition to the cottage.

=== Gymnasium ===
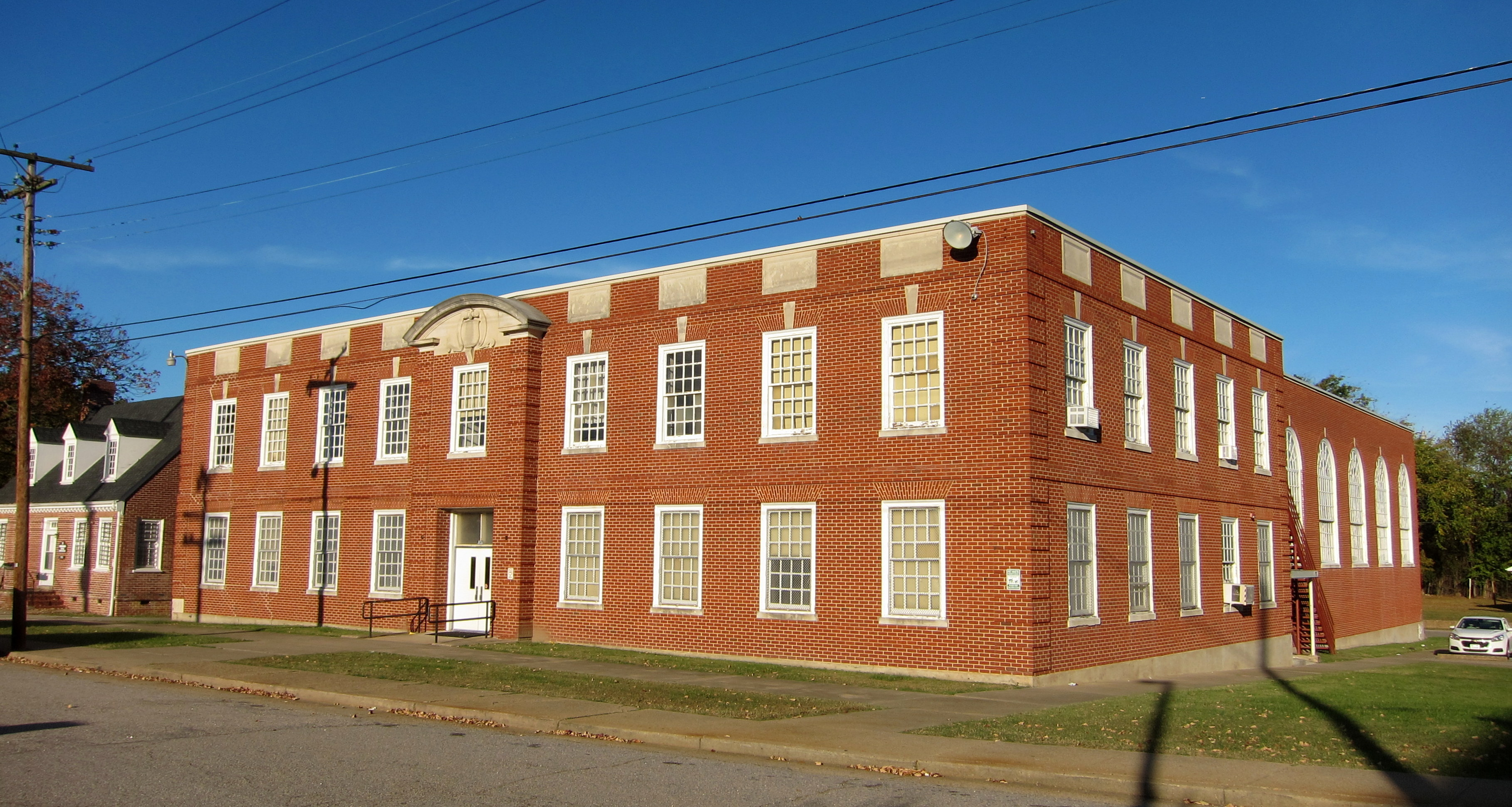
Gymnasium and Home Economics Cottage (far left)

The two-story, Colonial Revival gymnasium was built in 1949 and features a cornerstone on the northwest corner inscribed with the year construction was completed. It is located at 111 North 12th Avenue, east of the club house and beside the Home Economics Cottage. The nine-bay brick building features quoining, decorative pilasters and a pedimented stone cap. Transom is above the modern metal doors. There are 12/12 wood sash windows with brick arches on the first floor and 12/12 wood sash windows with brick jack arches on the second floor. A keystone and decorative limestone panels are above the second floor windows. The large second floor wood sash windows on the rear portion of the building feature round-arched fanlights. There are two modern doors on the south side of the building. The first floor entrance includes a metal canopy. A metal staircase just east of this entrance leads to the door on the second floor. A boiler room is in the rear portion of the building. The building features wood floors in the gymnasium and concrete floors elsewhere. In addition to the two-story gymnasium, the original layout included classrooms, a band room, boys and girls locker rooms and storage space.

=== Science and Library Building ===
The two-story, International Style Science and Library Building, which includes a full basement, was built in 1959. It is located at 103 North 12th Avenue, east of the main school building and south of the gymnasium. The projecting one-story entrance, featuring four-bay store front windows with transoms and a pair of full light doors with transoms, is covered by a flat aluminum roof. "Hopewell School Board Office" is lettered above the entrance. There are aluminum frame sliding glass windows on the north and south sides of the building. The exterior walls on these sides are clad with EIFS (exterior insulation finishing system) which was added in the 1990s after a storm damaged the building. An aluminum canopy covers the entrance on North 11th Avenue.

The original layout of the basement featured offices, testing rooms, work rooms, a board room, an elementary education room, an employee lounge, restrooms, the janitor closet and a boiler room. Classrooms, a faculty lounge, a library and A.V. room, restrooms and storage space were on the first floor. The entire second floor was devoted to science and featured classrooms, labs, prep areas as well as restrooms.

== See also ==
- National Register of Historic Places listings in Hopewell, Virginia
