= C. Hardaway Marks =

American politician

Member of the Virginia House of Delegates
- In office January 10, 1962 – January 8, 1992
- Preceded by: Paris I. Leadbetter
- Succeeded by: William K. Barlow
- Constituency: 56th district (1962‍–‍1964); 55th district (1964‍–‍1966); 54th district (1966‍–‍1972); 37th district (1972‍–‍1982); 35th district (1982‍–‍1983); 64th district (1983‍–‍1991)

Personal details
- Born: Charles Hardaway Marks; January 31, 1921 Hopewell, Virginia, U.S.
- Died: November 13, 2004 (aged 83) Prince George, Virginia, U.S.
- Party: Democratic
- Spouse: Archibald Davis Andrews
- Children: Charles Harrison Marks, Martha Dare Marks
- Education: Wake Forest University; Duke University; University of Virginia
- Occupation: Lawyer; farmer; politician

Military service
- Branch/service: United States Marine Corps
- Years of service: 1941–1945
- Battles/wars: World War II; Pacific theater
- Awards: Purple Heart

Charles Hardaway Marks (January 31, 1921 – November 13, 2004) was an American attorney and politician.

== Political career ==
Marks, a Democrat, served as a member of the Virginia House of Delegates from 1962 to 1991 where he represented the people of the City of Hopewell, and the counties of Prince George, Charles City, and at times, Surry. As a member of the General Assembly, Mr. Marks initiated the legislation which provided state recognition for eight Virginia Indian tribes and created the Virginia Indian Commission. He served as the commission's first chairman. He was honored by the Standing Bear Award presented to him for his work on behalf of the Virginia Indian community. He was the founding chairman of the Virginia Alcohol Safety Action Program (VASAP) and he received its Distinguished Service Award in 2000. When he retired from the House of Delegates; he was second in seniority and he chaired the Courts of Justice Committee. He was also a member and past chairman of the Corporations, Insurance and Banking Committee and he served on the Privileges and Elections and the Rules Committees.

== Background ==
Born in Hopewell, Virginia, Marks graduated from Hopewell High School in 1940 and earned a bachelor's degree from Wake Forest University; he also attended Duke University and University of Virginia Law School. Marks was a founding partner of the Marks & Harrison law firm and was a member of the Virginia State Bar for 50 years. In 1987, he received the Distinguished Service Award from the Virginia Trial Lawyers Association. He was also involved in commercial, retail, and residential real estate development; the creation of several finance companies and two local banks which eventually became part of Wachovia; and farming.

Marks died in Prince George, Virginia after a long illness. Marks was a veteran of World War II and had served as a captain in the United States Marine Corps. He was wounded during the Battle of Iwo Jima, for which he received the Purple Heart. He was a longtime member of Merchant's Hope Church in Prince George.

== Legacy ==
In 1998 the Charles Hardaway Marks Bridges spanning the Appomattox River between Hopewell and Chesterfield were named in his honor.
