= Nelson Barclift =

American choreographer and dancer

- Barclift in a drag role in This Is the Army (musical) (1942)
- Born: Edgar Nelson Barclift; September 14, 1917; Hopewell, Virginia, US
- Died: March 11, 1993 (aged 75); Palm Springs, California

Edgar Nelson Barclift (September 14, 1917 – March 11, 1993) was an American choreographer and dancer. As a member of the United States Army's Theatre Section during the Second World War, he was the co-choreographer and principal dancer of Irving Berlin's This Is The Army (1942). He choreographed the musical Around the World (1946). He became the romantic partner of the composer and songwriter Cole Porter in the early 1940s.

== Early life ==
Edgar Nelson Barclift was born on September 14, 1917, in Hopewell, Virginia.

== Career ==
Barclift found work as a dancer in Kurt Weill's 1937 opera The Eternal Road but the production was postponed as a result of designer Norman Bel Geddes striking water while creating a replica of a mountain at the Manhattan Opera House. Due to the postponement Barclift was able to attend the Bennington School of the Dance in 1937; while there he studied with Doris Humphrey, Charles Weidman, and Martha Graham. He returned to New York City in the autumn to resume work on The Eternal Road. In 1939 Barclift danced at the World's Fair in New York. His first solo work was in Rodgers and Hart's Too Many Girls (1939).

With the entry of the United States into the Second World War, Barclift joined the United States Army in 1942 and was stationed at West Point and Fort Jay, where he was a part of the army's Theatre Section. A romance developed between Barclift and the songwriter Cole Porter during the latter's work on the 1942 musical Something for the Boys. Porter would regularly write to Barclift; often at 2 or 3 o'clock in the morning while he was working on songs. Porter's letters often contained Hollywood gossip and flirtatious epithets. Porter addressed Barclift as his "cute little nose". Barclift later said that "You'd Be So Nice to Come Home To" was his and Porter's 'song'.

Barclift wrote an article titled "Dancer – In the Army" for The American Dancer magazine in 1942 about his military service in the ongoing war. Porter wrote to Barclift with gossip and recommendations of friends to see when Barclift was stationed in Italy during the war.

Barclift was the principal dancer and co-choreographer of Irving Berlin's This is the Army (1942). He was the choreographer of the musical Around the World (1946). Around the World was produced and directed by Orson Welles, who also wrote the book for the musical. It was composed by Porter. This is the Army ran at the Broadway Theater; the subsequent success of the musical saw it being made into a film of the same name. Barclift also played the dancer Zorina in the show.

== Recollections ==
The dancer Dorothy Bird recalled dancing with Barclift in her 2002 memoir Bird's Eye View, describing him as a "happy-go-lucky lighthearted dancer" who was "very proud of his native American Indian heritage". Bird described Barclift's physique as "tall and loose-limbed" and related that he was "open and generous in his movements". Barclift and Bird auditioned for the musical Lady in the Dark, showing their prepared act for the show to the show's choreographer, Albertina Rasch. Bird related in her memoir that Rasch simply appropriated her and Barclift's dance for the show without asking their permission, a common practice at the time. Barclift was drafted into the United States Army during the run of Lady in the Dark, and once surprised Bird by taking his place to dance with her in the musical while on temporary leave.

Barclift is mentioned by Christopher Isherwood in his diary entry for April 15, 1968, when he visits Isherwood and asks him to be in a television programme with Laura Huxley.

== Death ==
Barclift died on March 11, 1993, aged 76, in Palm Springs, California, after a long illness.

== Sources ==
- William McBrien (2000). Cole Porter: A Biography. Vintage Books. ISBN 978-0-679-72792-7.
