= Curtis W. Harris =

American politician (1924–2017)

- Curtis W. Harris

Personal details
- Born: July 1, 1924 Dendron, Virginia
- Died: December 10, 2017 (aged 93) Chester, Virginia, U.S.
- Residence: Hopewell, Virginia
- Parents: Thelma and Sandy Harris
- Spouse: Dr. Ruth Jones Harris (deceased)
- Children: Curtis W. Harris Jr., Kenneth C. Harris Sr. (deceased), Michael B. Harris I, Joanne Harris Lucas, Karen D. Bradford, Ruth Michelle Pritchett
- Profession: Minister, civil rights activist, politician
- Education: Hopewell Public Schools, Virginia Union University, Virginia University of Lynchburg, Virginia State University, Urban Training Center for Christian Missions, Medical College of Virginia

Curtis West Harris (July 1, 1924 – December 10, 2017) was an African-American minister, civil rights activist, and politician in Virginia, United States. Harris became the first African-American mayor of Hopewell, Virginia and was the recipient of numerous awards and honors.

== Civil rights work ==
Harris moved to Hopewell, Virginia with his family in 1928, and in 1946 married Ruth Jones of Hopewell with whom he had six children. His civil rights work began in 1950 with his stint as president of the Hopewell chapter of the National Association for the Advancement of Colored People (NAACP). In 1960, he was arrested and sentenced to 60 days in jail for his role in a sit-in staged at the segregated George's Drugstore in Hopewell. Later that year, he initiated a protest against the city's segregated swimming pool that culminated in the closure of the pool. In 1966, Harris led a peaceful demonstration to dissuade the city from building a landfill in Rosedale, an African American community. He was confronted by the Ku Klux Klan on the steps of city hall. Harris was arrested 13 times for civil disobedience during his years of involvement in the Civil Rights Movement and received death threats as well as an effort to firebomb his home.

In 1960, Harris helped to organize the Hopewell Improvement Association, an affiliate of the Southern Christian Leadership Conference (SCLC), and was elected vice president. He was named to the board of directors of the National SCLC in 1961 while Dr. Martin Luther King Jr. was president. Also in 1961, Harris was cited for contempt by the Boatwright Committee of the Virginia General Assembly for not revealing the names of individuals associated with SCLC and not responding to the questions asked by the committee. On March 29, 1962, Dr. King along with more than 100 Virginia ministers and laymen accompanied Harris to his contempt trial in Hopewell. He worked with Dr. King on multiple civil rights initiatives, including the March on Washington in 1963 and the Selma to Montgomery March in 1965, and considered him one of his mentors in the Civil Rights Movement. Harris served as president of the Virginia State Unit of SCLC from 1963–1998, and was elected the National SCLC vice president in 2005. In 1968, Harris was appointed to the Virginia Advisory Committee of the U.S. Commission on Civil Rights. In 1987, he led a march against discrimination in Colonial Heights, Virginia. In 1996, he filed a racial discrimination complaint against the Fort Lee Army base. In 1998 he became Hopewell's first black mayor. In 2007, Harris demonstrated against a proposed ethanol plant being built in Hopewell with support from the national SCLC.

== Church and political work ==
Harris was employed as a janitor at Allied Chemical and Dye Company when he was ordained a Baptist minister in 1959. He first served as a pastor at First Baptist Church, Bermuda Hundred in Chester, Virginia and remained there until 1969. In 1961, he was called to pastor at both Union Baptist Church in Hopewell and Gilfield Baptist Church in Ivor, Virginia. Harris retired from Gilfield in 1994, and on December 16, 2007, he delivered his final sermon at Union Baptist after a 46-year pastorship. Harris was also president of the Hopewell Ministerial Association, Moderator/Executive Director of Bethany Baptist Association and Allied Bodies, and affiliated with Lott Carey Foreign Mission.

As early as 1964, Harris ran for a seat on the Hopewell City Council. After seven attempts to be elected, he and many other like-minded residents moved the city of Hopewell to replace its longstanding at-large system with a ward system in 1983. Harris was finally elected to the Hopewell City Council (Ward 2) in 1986; in 1994 he was elected vice mayor; and in 1998, Harris was sworn in as the first African-American mayor of Hopewell. After 26 years of service to the city as well as to his constituents in Ward 2, Harris retired from his seat on the Hopewell City Council on March 1, 2012.

On February 11, 2014, the Hopewell City Council voted to rename Terminal Street, "Rev C W Harris Street." For 57 years, Curtis and Ruth Harris lived at 209 Terminal Street, the street in Hopewell which now bears his name. The council also voted to rename Booker Street (which intersects Rev. C. W. Harris Street), "Ruth Harris Way" in honor of Harris' late wife, Dr. Ruth J. Harris. The street sign ceremony, hosted by the Hopewell City Council, was held at Union Baptist Church on June 15, 2014, to pay tribute to Curtis and Ruth Harris. Herbert Bragg, Hopewell's Intergovernmental and Public Affairs Director, was master of ceremony, music was rendered by the Harris Connection Singers (consisting of Harris' children and grandchildren), and statements were made by numerous local officials and family members. Letters were read from Virginia Governor Terry McAuliffe, U.S. Senator Mark Warner and U.S. Senator Tim Kaine.

On July 1, 2017, Harris celebrated his 93rd birthday with family and friends at a program, "The Life and Legacy of Rev. Dr. Curtis West Harris," hosted by Union Baptist Church where he was pastor emeritus. He died in Chester, Virginia on December 10, 2017 at the age of 93.

== Awards and honors ==
- 1971 - Citizen of the Year Award (Alpha Kappa Alpha sorority, Delta Omega chapter)
- 1972 - Awarded an Honorary Doctor of Divinity degree (Virginia University of Lynchburg, Lynchburg, VA)
- 1978 - Dedicated Service Award (Virginia State University President, Board of Visitors and Faculty, Petersburg, VA)
- 1981 - Rosa Parks Award (National Southern Christian Leadership Conference)
- 1983 - Awarded an Honorary Doctor of Law degree (Virginia University of Lynchburg, Lynchburg, VA)
- 1984 - Recognition of Excellence (United States Department of Housing and Urban Development)
- 1984 - Majestic Leader Award (The Lott Carey Baptist Foreign Mission Convention, Landover, MD)
- 1992 - Unmatched Determination Award (Southern Christian Leadership Conference National Board)
- 1998 - Sworn in as first African-American mayor of Hopewell, Virginia
- 2000 - American Century Award (The Washington Times Foundation, Inc., Washington, DC)
- 2001 - Selected for Dominion Strong Men and Women: Excellence in Leadership (Dominion Energy, Richmond, VA)
- 2005 - Elected Vice President of National Southern Christian Leadership Conference
- 2007 - Library in Carter G. Woodson Middle School in Hopewell, Virginia dedicated to and named for Curtis W. Harris (Hopewell School Board, Hopewell, VA)
- 2014 - Two streets in Hopewell, Virginia renamed in honor of Curtis W. Harris and his wife, Ruth J. Harris (Hopewell City Council, Hopewell, VA)
- 2015 - Highlighted at the Virginia Legends Luncheon (Radio One Incorporated, Richmond, VA)
- 2016 - Lifetime Leadership Award (Children's Home of Virginia Baptist, Inc., Petersburg, VA)
- 2017 - Life and Legacy of Rev. Dr. Curtis West Harris Celebration (Union Baptist Church, Hopewell, VA)
- 2019 - Hopewell City Council voted its approval on May 28 of a bust of Curtis Harris' likeness being erected in his honor on the Ashford Civic Plaza in downtown Hopewell.
- 2019 - Congressman A. Donald McEachin (VA-04) introduced bipartisan legislation to rename the Hopewell post office at 117 West Poythress Street in honor of Curtis Harris.
- 2020 - McEachin's legislation unanimously passed in the House and Senate; became public law on December 21
- 2021 - Reverend Curtis West Harris Post Office Ceremony and Reception on July 15 (Hopewell, VA)
- 2023 - MLK, Jr. Memorial Foundation, Inc. erected Curtis Harris bust sculpted by Rick Weaver on December 2 (Ashford Civic Plaza, Hopewell, VA)
