= Charles Hardaway Marks Bridges =

Bridge in Virginia, United States

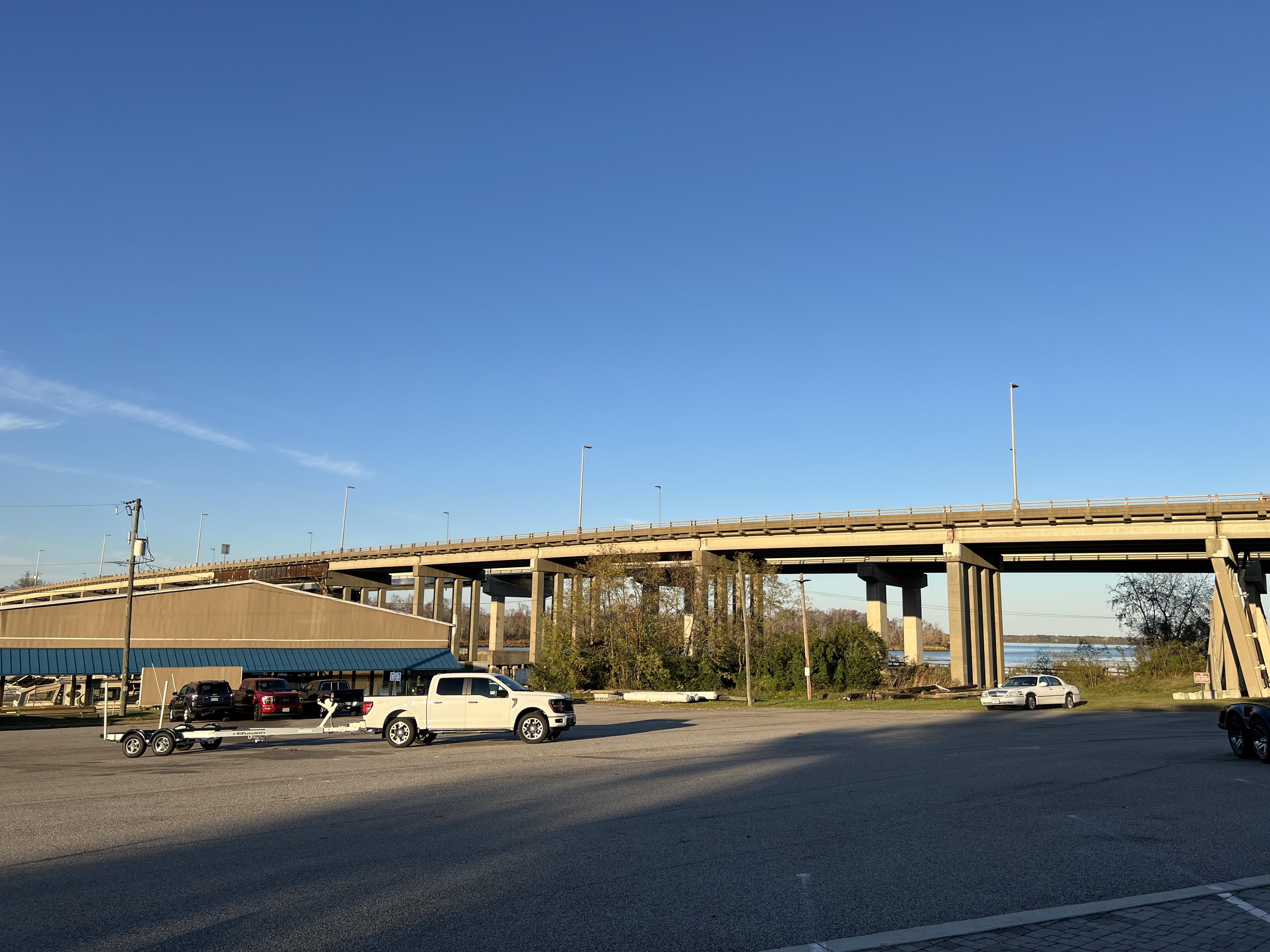
- Coordinates: 37°18′44″N 77°17′50″W
- Carries: State Route 10
- Crosses: Appomattox River
- Locale: Virginia
- Named for: C. Hardaway Marks
- Preceded by: A drawbridge

Characteristics
- No. of spans: 2

Location
- Interactive map of Charles Hardaway Marks Bridges

The Charles Hardaway Marks Bridges are twin spans which carry State Route 10 across the Appomattox River in Virginia. The bridges are in Chesterfield County, and the independent city of Hopewell in the Tri-Cities area of the Richmond-Petersburg region.

The first span was completed in the early 1970s and the second span was constructed in the mid-1990s. In 1998, the bridges were named in honor of Charles Hardaway Marks (1921–2004), a prominent local attorney and politician who was long a state legislator representing the area in the Virginia General Assembly. Marks was a retired US Marine Corps Captain who served in the Pacific theater during World War II, was wounded at the Battle of Iwo Jima and awarded a Purple Heart. He served in the Virginia House of Delegates from 1962 through 1991.

Due to the wording of the Hopewell city charter, the portion of the Appomattox River adjacent to the shoreline of that city is in Chesterfield County. Thus, a portion of the twin bridges pass through the county as they cross the river. Nearby the current bridges was an earlier drawbridge which was the site of a fatal bus accident on December 22, 1935, which killed 13 people who drowned when the bus failed to stop and plunged into the river while the drawbridge was open.
