= Darrell Taylor =

American football player (born 1997)

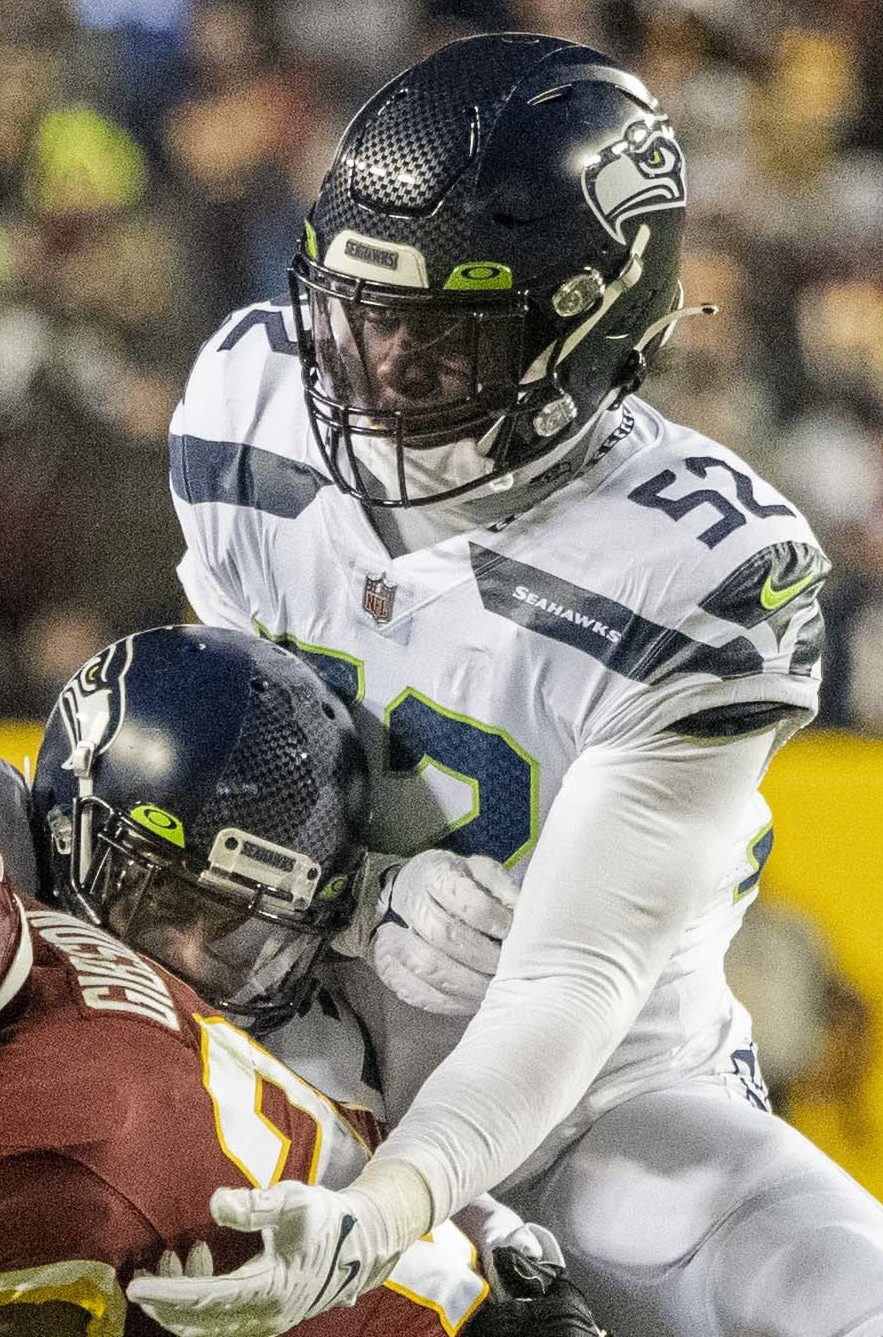
- Taylor with the Seattle Seahawks in 2021

Profile
- Position: Defensive end

Personal information
- Born: March 24, 1997 (age 29); Hopewell, Virginia, U.S.
- Listed height: 6 ft 4 in (1.93 m)
- Listed weight: 267 lb (121 kg)

Career information
- High school: Hopewell
- College: Tennessee (2015–2019)
- NFL draft: 2020: 2nd round, 48th overall pick

Career history
- Seattle Seahawks (2020–2023); Chicago Bears (2024); Houston Texans (2025); New England Patriots (2025)*
- * Offseason or practice squad member only

Career NFL statistics as of Week 10, 2025
- Total tackles: 126
- Sacks: 24.5
- Forced fumbles: 7
- Fumble recoveries: 1
- Pass deflections: 5
- Stats at Pro Football Reference

Darrell Lamond Taylor (born March 24, 1997) is an American professional football defensive end. He played college football for the Tennessee Volunteers.

== Early life ==
Taylor grew up in Hopewell, Virginia and attended Hopewell High School, where he played football. Rated a four-star recruit, Taylor committed to play college football at the University of Tennessee over offers from Florida and Virginia Tech.

== College career ==
Taylor played at the University of Tennessee from 2015–2019 under coaches Butch Jones and Jeremy Pruitt. Taylor redshirted his true freshman season. As a redshirt freshman, he made nine tackles (one for loss) in eight games played. Taylor missed two games of his redshirt sophomore year due to a suspension for an altercation with a teammate. He finished the season with 27 tackles, four tackles for loss, three sacks and two forced fumbles. As a redshirt junior, Taylor led the team with eight sacks and 11 tackles for loss with 36 total tackles.

Taylor entered his redshirt senior year on the Chuck Bednarik Award watchlist. Taylor finished the season tied for second in the Southeastern Conference with 8.5 sacks and led the Volunteers with 10 tackles for loss along with 46 total tackles, a forced fumble, a fumble recovery and four passes defended. Taylor finished his collegiate career with 118 tackles, 26.5 tackles for loss, and 19.5 sacks with six forced fumbles, four fumble recoveries and seven passes defended in 38 games.

== Professional career ==
Pre-draft measurables
Height	Weight	Arm length	Hand span	Wonderlic
6 ft 3 5/8 in (1.92 m)	267 lb (121 kg)	33 in (0.84 m)	9 3/4 in (0.25 m)	12
All values from NFL Combine

=== Seattle Seahawks ===
Taylor was invited to the NFL Scouting Combine, but did not participate in any drills due to an offseason surgery. Taylor was selected by the Seattle Seahawks in the second round with the 48th pick in the 2020 NFL draft. He was placed on the active/non-football injury list at the start of training camp on August 3, 2020. He was moved to the reserve/non-football injury list at the start of the regular season on September 5, 2020. He returned to practice on January 5, 2021, but the team did not activate him before the end of the season.

On October 17, 2021, in a Sunday Night Football game against the Pittsburgh Steelers, Taylor suffered what appeared to be a serious neck/head injury, and left the field injured on a stretcher under medical care. After the game, the Seahawks confirmed that Taylor had feeling in all of his extremities and that he was expected to fly back to Seattle with the rest of his team. He appeared in 16 games, of which he started five. He finished with 6.5 sacks, 37 total tackles (28 solo), one pass defensed, and one forced fumble.

In the 2022 season, Taylor appeared in 16 regular season games and started three. He had 9.5 sacks, 26 total tackles (22 solo), one pass defended, and four forced fumbles. In the 2023 season, Taylor appeared in all 17 regular season games and started five. He had 5.5 sacks, 28 total tackles (17 solo), and one pass defended.

=== Chicago Bears ===
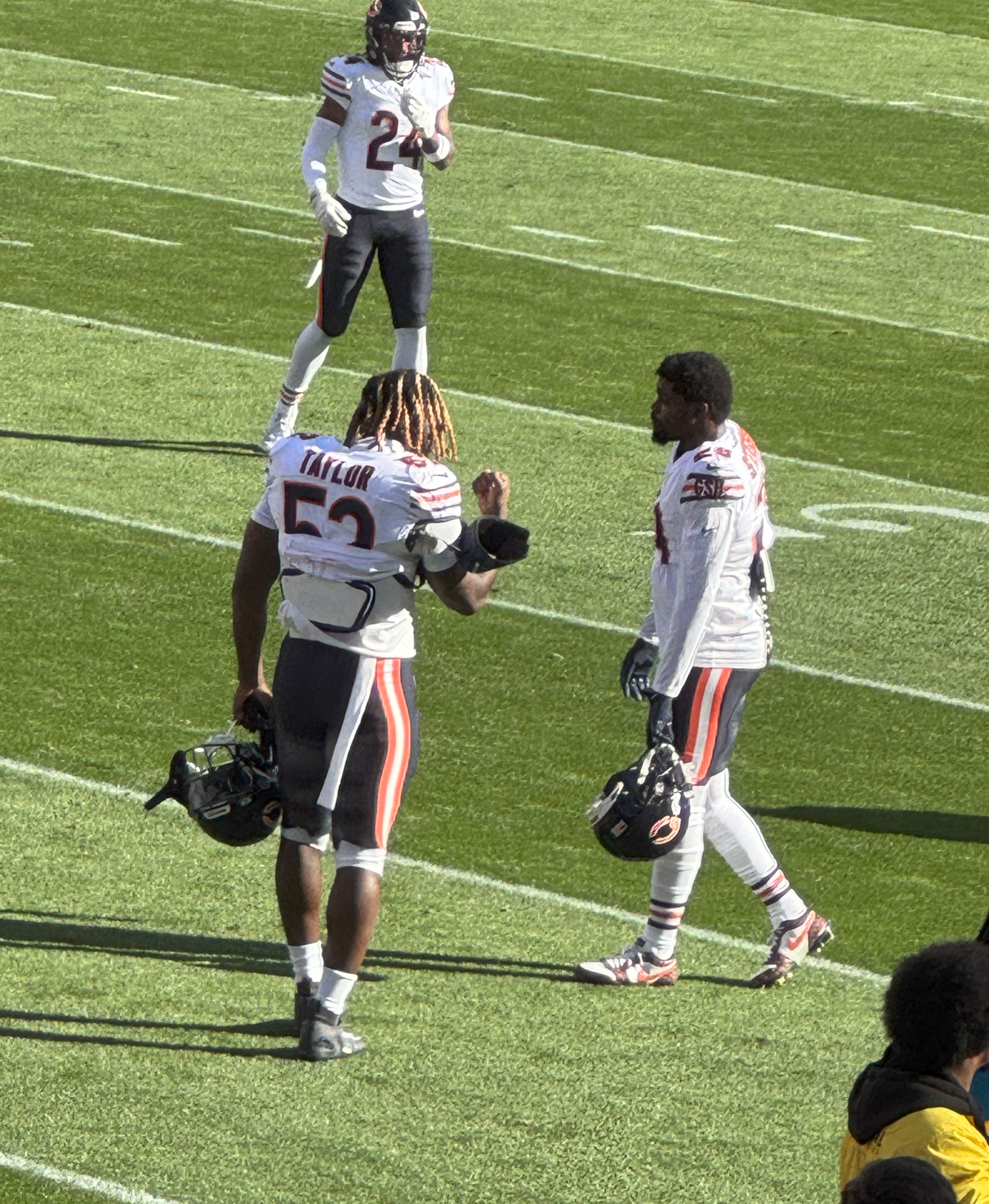
Taylor (left) with Tyrique Stevenson in 2024

On August 23, 2024, Taylor was traded to the Chicago Bears in exchange for 2025 sixth-round pick. In his first game as a Bear in Week 1 against the Tennessee Titans, Taylor had two sacks and a forced fumble in the Bears 24–17 comeback win.

=== Houston Texans ===
On March 14, 2025, Taylor signed with the Houston Texans. He was placed on injured reserve on November 5 due to an ankle injury suffered in Week 9 against the Denver Broncos. He was activated on January 6, 2026, but was released six days later.

=== New England Patriots ===
On January 14, 2026, Taylor was signed to the New England Patriots' practice squad. He was released on January 23.

== NFL career statistics ==
Legend
**Bold**	Career high

=== Regular season ===
Year	Team	Games		Tackles						Interceptions						Fumbles			
Year	Team	GP	GS	Cmb	Solo	Ast	TfL	Sck	Sfty	Int	Yds	Avg	Lng	TD	PD	FF	FR	Yds	TD
2021	SEA	16	**5**	**37**	**28**	9	7	6.5	0	0	0	0.0	0	0	1	1	0	0	0
2022	SEA	16	3	26	22	4	**8**	**9.5**	0	0	0	0.0	0	0	1	**4**	**1**	**21**	0
2023	SEA	**17**	**5**	28	17	11	7	5.5	0	0	0	0.0	0	0	1	0	0	0	0
2024	CHI	16	0	32	20	**12**	3	3.0	0	0	0	0.0	0	0	**2**	2	0	0	0
2025	HOU	4	0	3	1	2	0	0.0	0	0	0	0.0	0	0	0	0	0	0	0
Career		69	13	126	88	38	25	24.5	0	0	0	0.0	0	0	5	7	1	21	0
