= City Point National Cemetery =

Historic veterans cemetery in Hopewell, Virginia

- U.S. National Register of Historic Places
- Virginia Landmarks Register
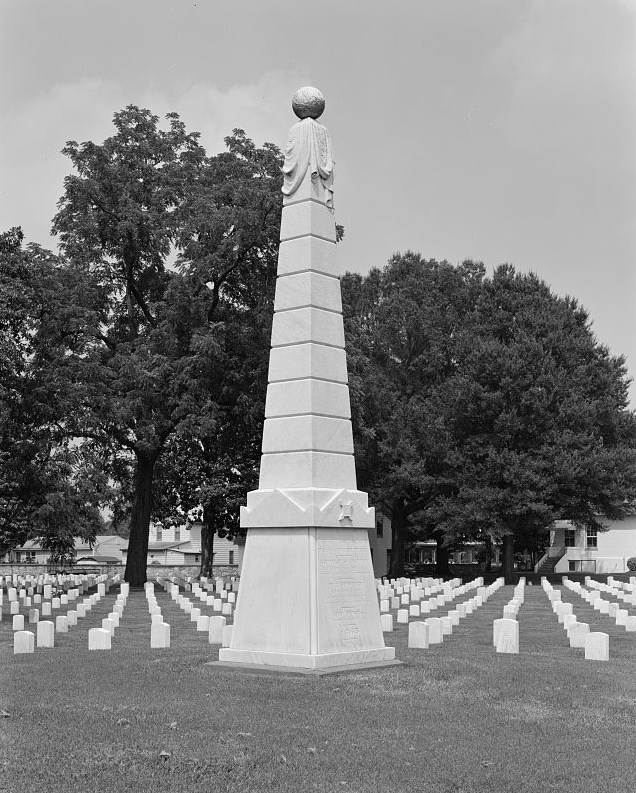
- Army of the James Monument

- Location within Virginia Location within the United States
- Location: Jct. of 10th Ave. and Davis St., Hopewell, Virginia
- Coordinates: 37°18′21″N 77°17′50″W
- Area: 7 acres (2.8 ha)
- Built: 1866
- Architectural style: Colonial Revival
- MPS: Civil War Era National Cemeteries MPS
- NRHP reference No.: 95000923
- VLR No.: 116-0006

Significant dates
- Added to NRHP: August 10, 1995
- Designated VLR: September 19, 1978

City Point National Cemetery is a United States National Cemetery in the community of City Point within the city of Hopewell, Virginia. Administered by the United States Department of Veterans Affairs, it encompasses 6.7 acres (2.7 ha), and as of the end of 2005, had 6,909 interments. It is managed by Hampton National Cemetery.

== History ==
During the Civil War, the area around City Point was a Union supply depot, established by General Ulysses S. Grant. Its proximity to the Confederate capitol of Richmond, Virginia made it an ideal staging place. The cemetery was established to reinter soldiers who were buried in the seven nearby hospital cemeteries and those from makeshift battlefield plots throughout the area.

City Point National Cemetery was listed on the National Register of Historic Places in 1995.

== Notable monuments ==
- The Army of the James Monument, a 20' high white marble monument erected in 1865.
