= Hopewell High School (Virginia) =

Coordinates: 37°17′23.3″N 77°18′53.1″W

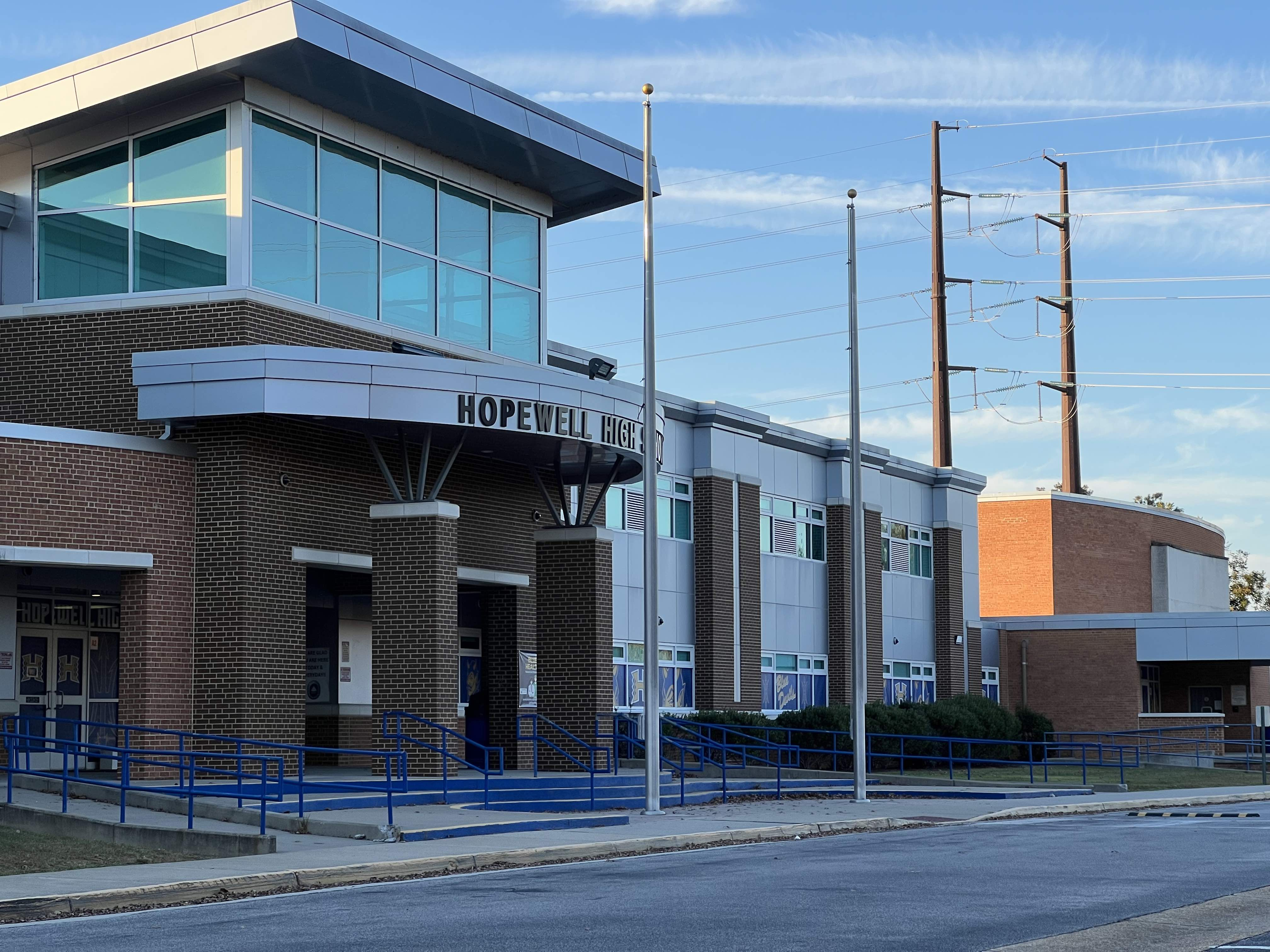

Location
- 400 South Mesa Drive; Hopewell, Virginia 23860; United States

Information
- School type: Public high school
- Founded: 1915, 1925, 1968 (current facility)
- Locale: Suburban, Large
- School district: Hopewell Public Schools
- NCES District ID: 5101980
- Superintendent: Melody Hackney
- NCES School ID: 510198000867
- Principal: Stephanie Poe
- Teaching staff: 69.29 (on an FTE basis)
- Grades: 9–12
- Enrollment: 1,136 (2024–25)
- Student to teacher ratio: 16.39
- Language: English
- Campus: mid-sized-urban
- Colors: Blue and Gold
- Mascot: Blue Devils
- Team name: Hopewell Blue Devils
- Athletic Conference: AAA Central District; Region 3A; Conference 26
- Website: Official Site

Hopewell High School is a secondary school located in Hopewell, Virginia. Opened in 1967, it is the only high school in Hopewell, Virginia. From 1925 to 1967, the high school in Hopewell was located at the Hopewell High School Complex, also known as James E. Mallonee Middle School.

== Academics ==
HHS ranks among the top 15,000~ high schools in America, 290~ in Virginia, and 40~ in the Richmond Metro Area. 14% of students take part in AP classes, with 1% of students passing at least 1 AP exam. The graduation rate is 80%.

== Sports ==
The Hopewell Blue Devils have won state titles in football and basketball. Their latest title came in 2019, in football, when the team beat Lord Botetourt High School 35–7, at Liberty University, to win the 3A state title. Hopewell also won the Division 3 state title in 2017 when the Blue Devils defeated Heritage 20–14 in Williamsburg, VA. In 2003, the team won the AAA Division 5 state championship in football. All together Hopewell has won six state championships in football (1949, 1950, 1951, 2003, 2017, and 2019). Hopewell has also had three state champions in wrestling: Cody Allala (145, 152, 160) Clint Allala (171) and their latest champion, Alize Branch (138, 145). The boys' basketball team, though a perennial contender and frequent final four entrant, won its only state championship in 1972 under the leadership of VHSL Hall of Fame Coach Bill Littlepage. Littlepage won over 755 games in his illustrious career. The girls basketball team reached the state final in both 2017 and 2018 but was unsuccessful in both years. In 2017–2018, Hopewell was one of a few select schools in the entire state of Virginia when its girls basketball team, boys basketball team, baseball team and football team all won Region titles. In 2021, the Hopewell Boys Basketball team, under the guidance of coach Elvin Edmonds, won Hopewell's 2nd state championship by defeating Abingdon.

== Classes offered ==
- Business and Information Technology
- CTE Departments
- English
- Family and Consumer Science
- Fine Arts
- Foreign Language (Spanish and French)
- Guidance
- ISAEP/GED
- Marketing Education
- Math
- Physical Education
- Science
- Social Studies
- JROTC
- Health and Wellness
- Virtual Learning

== Notable alumni ==
- TreVeyon Henderson, American football player
- Darrell Taylor, professional football player
- Monsanto Pope, professional football player
- Dorothiea Hundley (aka Seka), adult film actress
- Lamar Giles, American author

Some notable attendees, but not graduates, are:

- Bass player Michael Bishop
