= Hopewell Municipal Building =

- U.S. National Register of Historic Places
- Virginia Landmarks Register
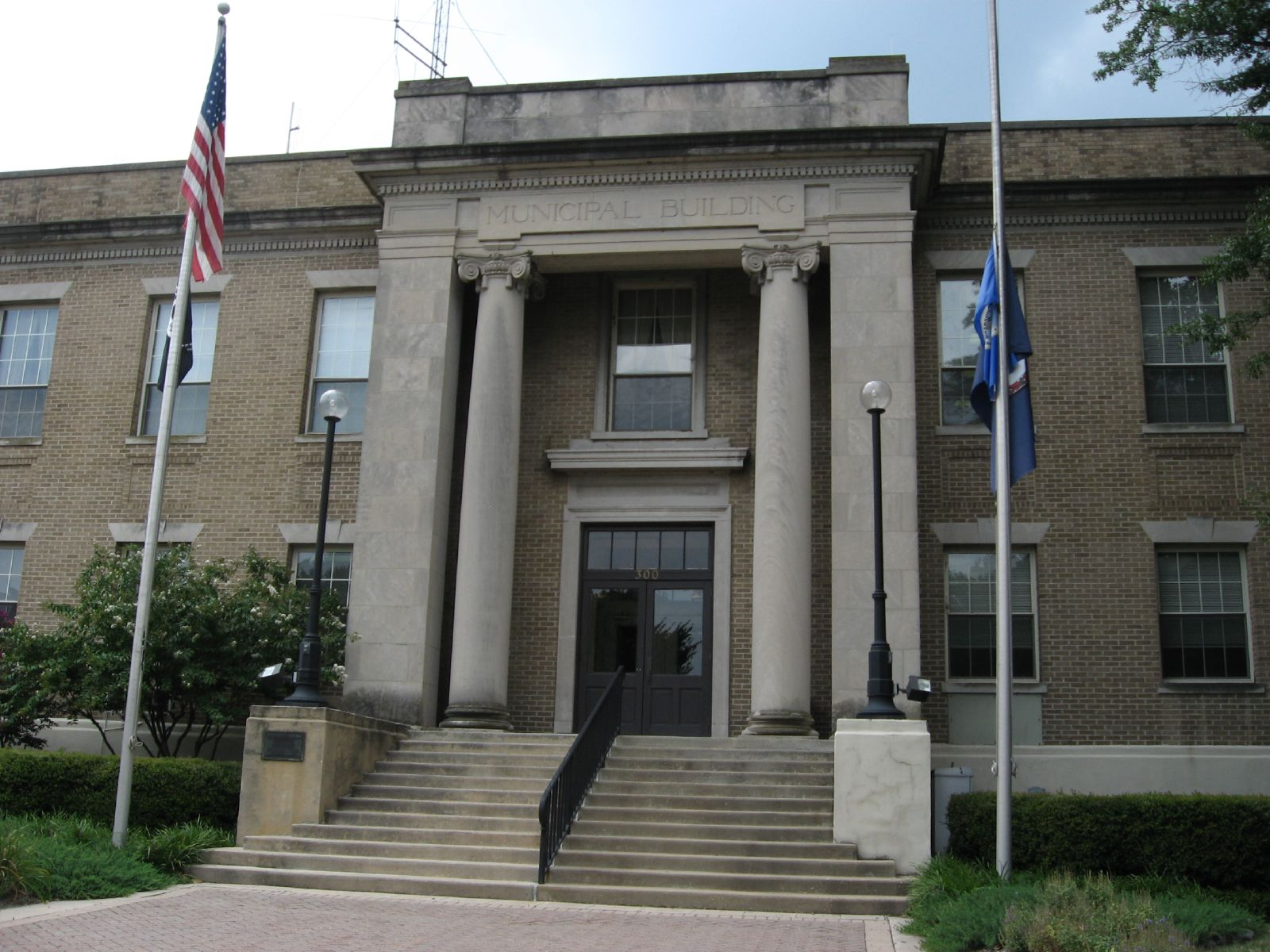
- Hopewell Municipal Building, July, 2008

- Location within Virginia Location within the United States
- Location: 300 Main St., Hopewell, Virginia
- Coordinates: 37°18′13″N 77°17′17″W
- Area: less than one acre
- Built: 1925, 1957
- Built by: Miller Engineering Co.
- Architect: Bishop, Fred A.
- Architectural style: Classical Revival
- NRHP reference No.: 98000451
- VLR No.: 116-5001

Significant dates
- Added to NRHP: May 8, 1998
- Designated VLR: December 3, 1997

Hopewell Municipal Building is a historic municipal building located at Hopewell, Virginia. It was built in 1925, and is a three-story, nine-bay, rectangular, sandstone brick building in the Classical Revival style. Attached to the main building is a three-story annex built in 1957. The main entrance is a stone framed double door with a five pane transom window and a six foot deep portico with two stone unfluted columns on either side. The building houses city offices and the police department.

It was listed on the National Register of Historic Places in 1998.
