= Hopewell, Virginia =

Independent city in the United States

- Independent city
- Motto: "Semper Paratus"
- Location in the State of Virginia
- Coordinates: 37°17′25″N 77°18′18″W
- Country: United States
- State: Virginia
- Incorporated: July 1, 1916

Government
  - Mayor: Johnny B. Partin Jr. (I)

Area
  - Total: 10.83 sq mi (28.05 km^{2})
  - Land: 10.36 sq mi (26.82 km^{2})
  - Water: 0.47 sq mi (1.23 km^{2}) 4.9%
- Elevation: 50 ft (15.2 m)

Population (2020)
  - Total: 23,033
  - Estimate (2025): 23,261 ▲
  - Density: 2,224/sq mi (858.8/km^{2})
- Time zone: UTC-5 (EST)
  - Summer (DST): UTC-4 (EDT)
- ZIP code: 23860
- Area code: 804
- FIPS code: 51-38424
- GNIS feature ID: 1495714
- Website: www.hopewellva.gov

Hopewell is an independent city surrounded by Prince George County and the Appomattox River in the Commonwealth of Virginia, United States. At the 2020 census, the population was 23,033. The Bureau of Economic Analysis combines the city of Hopewell with Prince George County for statistical purposes.

Hopewell is in the Tri-Cities area of the Richmond Metropolitan Statistical Area (MSA).

== History ==
=== City Point ===
The city was founded to take advantage of its site overlooking the James and Appomattox Rivers. City Point, the oldest part of Hopewell, was established in 1613 by Sir Thomas Dale. It was first known as "Bermuda City". (At this time, Bermuda, the Atlantic archipelago, was considered part of the Colony of Virginia and appeared on its maps.) The name soon changed to Charles City. In 1619, Samuel Sharpe and Samuel Jordan represented Charles City at the first meeting of the House of Burgesses. "Charles City Point" was in Charles City Shire when the first eight shires were established in the Colony of Virginia in 1634. Charles City Shire soon became known as Charles City County in 1643. The burgesses separated an area of the county south of the river, including City Point, establishing it separately as Prince George County in 1703.

During the American Civil War, Union General Ulysses S. Grant used City Point as his headquarters during the Siege of Petersburg in 1864 and 1865. Grant's headquarters, which President Lincoln visited, were located at Appomattox Manor, one of the three plantations of Richard Eppes, who cultivated wheat and other grains and held 130 slaves at the beginning of the war.

His property included most of the present-day city of Hopewell and Eppes Island, a plantation across the James River from City Point. Richard Slaughter, a former slave of Eppes, escaped to a Union ship during the Civil War, as did all but 12 of Eppes' 130 slaves, choosing freedom. Slaughter recounted his life story for a Works Progress Administration interviewer in 1936.

The City Point Railroad, built in 1838 between City Point and Petersburg, was used as a critical part of the siege strategy. It is considered the oldest portion of the Norfolk and Western Railway, now a part of Norfolk Southern.

City Point was an unincorporated town in Prince George County until the City of Hopewell annexed the Town of City Point in 1923. Despite the evolving name, Hopewell/City Point is the second-oldest continuously inhabited English settlement in the United States after Hampton. Jamestown is no longer inhabited.

=== Hopewell Farm ===
Hopewell, part of the Eppes' plantation, was developed by DuPont Company in 1914 as Hopewell Farm, an incorporated area in Prince George County. DuPont first built a dynamite factory there, then switched to the manufacture of guncotton during World War I.

Nearly burned to the ground in the Hopewell Fire of 1915, the city prospered afterward and became known as the "Wonder City" as the village of Hopewell grew from a hamlet of 400 in 1916 to a city of more than 20,000 people in a few short months. Unlike most cities in Virginia, Hopewell was never incorporated as a town, but it was incorporated as an independent city in 1916.

After DuPont abandoned the city following World War I, moving its manufacturing facilities elsewhere and specializing in other products, Hopewell briefly became a ghost town until 1923 when Tubize Corporation established a plant on the old DuPont site. The same year, the city of Hopewell annexed the neighboring town of City Point, which enabled it to expand and thrive. The Tubize plant was later acquired by Firestone Tire and Rubber Company and was a major employer in Hopewell for decades. Allied Chemical and Dye Corporation and Hercules Chemical also established plants on portions of the old DuPont site.

=== 20th-century populace ===
As early as its incorporation, Hopewell was a city of industrious migrants. Immigrants from Bohemia (now the western lands of the Czech Republic), Italy, and Greece populated the city, working in factories and opening small businesses. Others migrated from other parts of Virginia and neighboring states of North Carolina and West Virginia to work in Hopewell's industries.

As was the case in most southern cities, African Americans in Hopewell were subject to Jim Crow segregation until the success of the Civil Rights Movement. The picturesque theater in the middle of town, the Beacon Theatre, only allowed Blacks in the balcony. In August 1966, the Ku Klux Klan confronted the Reverend Curtis Harris and other Black Hopewell citizens when they attempted to petition the city manager to find an alternate location for a landfill that was going to be opened in the middle of a Black neighborhood. Hopewell public schools were desegregated under court order in 1963, following Renee Patrice GILLIAM et al v. School Board of the City of Hopewell, Virginia.

=== 1935 bus tragedy ===
Hopewell made national news when, on December 22, 1935, a bus plunged through the open draw of the Appomattox River Drawbridge on State Route 10 just outside Hopewell's city limits. Only one of the 15 occupants of the bus survived. The modern twin spans of the Charles Hardaway Marks Bridges were built to replace that bridge and cross the river nearby.

=== Urban renewal ===
Like many cities, Hopewell embarked on an urban renewal plan in the 1960s to revitalize its downtown retail area. The plan failed because many of the retail businesses that had been located downtown moved elsewhere to new shopping centers being developed outside the city limits in Petersburg, Chester, and Prince George County. With the exception of a new branch bank and a Hardee's fast-food restaurant constructed in the late 1970s, the former downtown area that was razed for redevelopment remained a vast gravel parking lot for decades.

A new urbanization is occurring, and many long-vacant storefronts are now refurbished and occupied. Several others are now under construction. Further, the city invested $12 million in a new flagship library for the Appomattox Regional Library System, the Maude Langhorne Nelson Library. The library has a cyber cafe, extensive YA and children's collections, and a replica of the historic, 1600s-era frigate ship Hopewell installed as a centerpiece. The city also restored the Beacon Theatre, which was built in 1928 and now hosts 70 or more concerts and other events annually. Performers there include The Temptations, The Four Tops, Vince Gill, Travis Tritt, Clint Black, Amy Grant, Average White Band, Vanilla Ice, The Commodores, Pure Prairie League, Delbert McClinton, and many more.

New plantings and street beautification projects have been put into place to attract more businesses and shoppers to the East Broadway area.

=== Toxic waste dumping ground ===
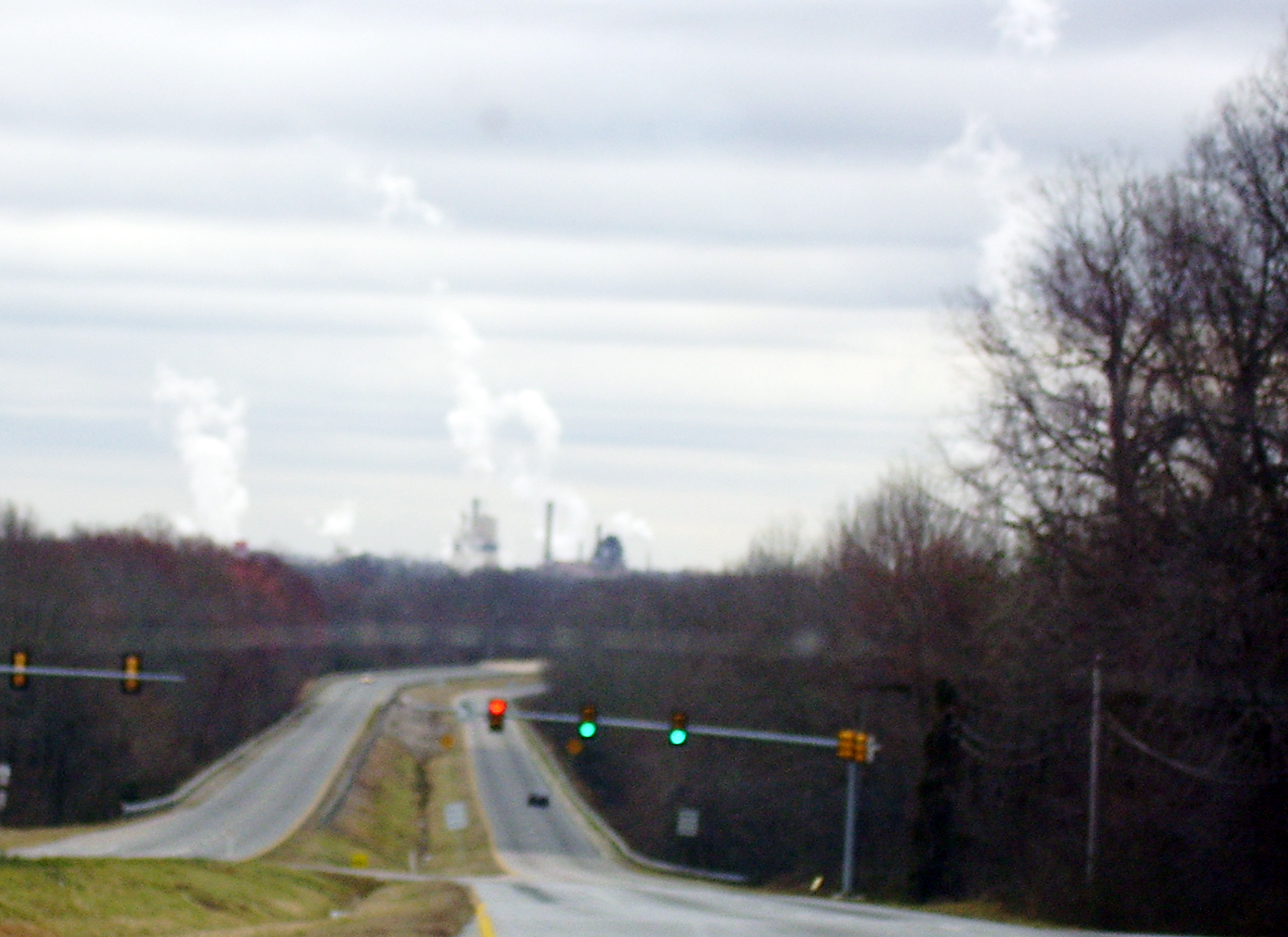
Smokestacks rise from Hopewell's skyline, seen from Chesterfield County

Hopewell is located at the confluence of the Appomattox and James rivers. The James River has suffered from serious water pollution problems attributable to chemical dumping; Kepone insecticide (manufactured in Hopewell from 1966–1975) was dumped in the river by the pesticide's manufacturer Allied Signal and subcontractor LifeSciences Product Company. The LifeSciences facility in Hopewell was the world's only manufacturer of Kepone, producing up to 6,000 pounds daily. Although closely related to the toxic pesticide DDT, which was banned in the U.S. in 1972 because of the dangers it presents to humans and wildlife, Kepone was not federally regulated until after the Hopewell disaster, in which 29 factory workers were hospitalized with various ailments. In 1975, the state health department shut down the facility, and fishing in the James River from Richmond to the Chesapeake Bay was banned due to contamination concerns.

Kepone is cited amongst a handful of other noxious substances as the driver for Gerald Ford's half-hearted approval of the Toxic Substances Control Act, which "remains one of the most controversial regulatory bills ever passed". Since the discovery of the Kepone disaster in 1975, the water quality has improved, and the fishing ban was lifted after 13 years. In 2019, after years of planning, the city opened a "Riverwalk" boardwalk, seeking to use scenic views and water access as part of overall economic redevelopment efforts. Bass and catfish are now routinely fished at a Hopewell marina.

Hopewell is the location of several large chemical plants owned by the Honeywell Corporation, Ashland, Evonik Industries, as well as a Green Plains Inc. ethanol plant and paper mill owned by WestRock.

=== Recent history ===
The Federal Correctional Complex, Petersburg (FCC Petersburg), two federal prisons housing 3,400 inmates, are located just outside city limits in Prince George County

Although still an important industrial city, Hopewell has struggled with transitions, including plant closures and job losses, changes in residential housing patterns, and the costs of environmental cleanup. Much of its middle class moved to newer housing in neighboring Prince George and Chesterfield counties during the suburban expansion of the 1960s and 1970s. The city's housing stock is dominated by relatively small homes, with a significant percentage offered as rental properties. Of these, many were hastily constructed over a century ago by DuPont to house plant workers during the First World War.

Hopewell has struggled with high rates of violent crime.

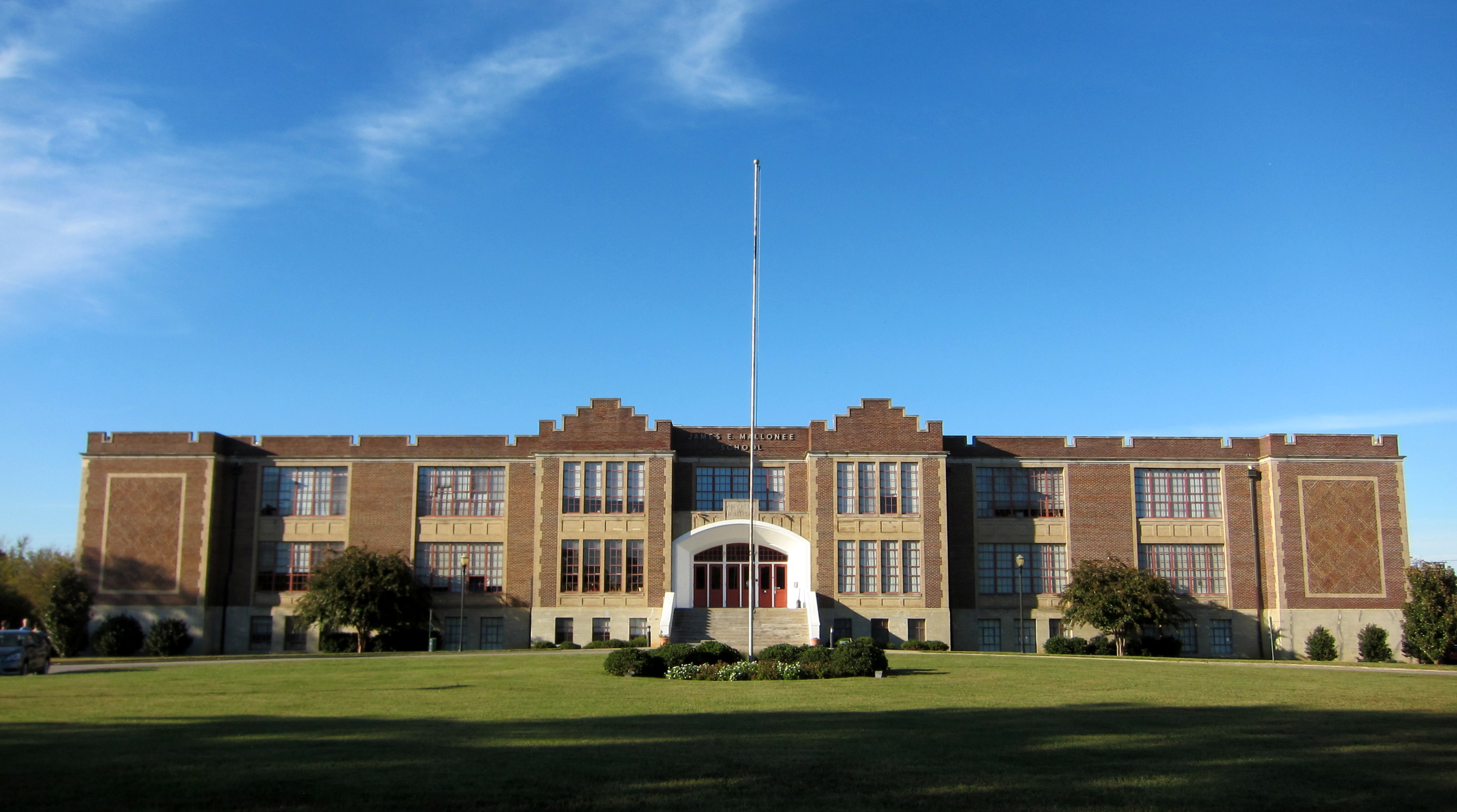
The former Hopewell High School, listed on the National Register of Historic Places, was renovated from 2009 to 2010 and now serves as an apartment building.

In September 2010, a series of explosions occurred at a controversial new ethanol plant that had recently been constructed on a long vacant site formerly occupied by a Firestone plant. In 2007, former Hopewell mayor and civil rights leader Curtis W. Harris, had marched against the proposed ethanol plant being built in Hopewell with support from the national Southern Christian Leadership Conference. The plant had not yet become fully operational when the explosions occurred. There was no loss of life due to the accident but shortly after the explosion Osage BioEnergy, the owners of the $150 million facility, announced that the plant was for sale. Although the facility was sitting idle through 2013 with the city of Hopewell taking legal action to recoup unpaid taxes on the property, the facility was eventually purchased by another firm and operations were restarted in 2014. In 2015 the troubled ethanol plant closed again for a second time after less than a year in operation with its owners citing a lack of profitability as the reason for the shutdown. The plant has since been purchased and re-opened by Green Plains Inc. of Omaha, Nebraska.

== Geography ==
According to the United States Census Bureau, the city has a total area of 10.8 square miles (28.0 km^{2}), of which 10.2 square miles (26.4 km^{2}) are land and 0.5 square miles (1.3 km^{2}) (4.9%) is water.

=== Climate ===
Climate data for Hopewell, Virginia (1991–2020 normals, extremes 1916–present)
Month	Jan	Feb	Mar	Apr	May	Jun	Jul	Aug	Sep	Oct	Nov	Dec	Year
Record high °F (°C)	81 (27)	84 (29)	91 (33)	100 (38)	100 (38)	104 (40)	105 (41)	106 (41)	104 (40)	100 (38)	88 (31)	85 (29)	106 (41)
Mean daily maximum °F (°C)	50.4 (10.2)	54.3 (12.4)	61.7 (16.5)	72.7 (22.6)	79.1 (26.2)	86.0 (30.0)	89.6 (32.0)	87.9 (31.1)	81.9 (27.7)	72.6 (22.6)	62.2 (16.8)	53.4 (11.9)	71.0 (21.7)
Daily mean °F (°C)	40.8 (4.9)	43.6 (6.4)	50.7 (10.4)	60.7 (15.9)	68.5 (20.3)	76.2 (24.6)	80.1 (26.7)	78.4 (25.8)	72.5 (22.5)	61.9 (16.6)	51.7 (10.9)	44.0 (6.7)	60.8 (16.0)
Mean daily minimum °F (°C)	31.2 (−0.4)	32.9 (0.5)	39.7 (4.3)	48.6 (9.2)	57.8 (14.3)	66.3 (19.1)	70.6 (21.4)	68.9 (20.5)	63.2 (17.3)	51.2 (10.7)	41.1 (5.1)	34.6 (1.4)	50.5 (10.3)
Record low °F (°C)	−11 (−24)	−3 (−19)	8 (−13)	20 (−7)	30 (−1)	40 (4)	44 (7)	45 (7)	38 (3)	23 (−5)	14 (−10)	3 (−16)	−11 (−24)
Average precipitation inches (mm)	3.53 (90)	3.01 (76)	4.02 (102)	3.84 (98)	4.25 (108)	4.56 (116)	5.18 (132)	5.59 (142)	5.15 (131)	3.67 (93)	3.43 (87)	3.84 (98)	50.07 (1,272)
Average snowfall inches (cm)	2.1 (5.3)	1.0 (2.5)	0.0 (0.0)	0.0 (0.0)	0.0 (0.0)	0.0 (0.0)	0.0 (0.0)	0.0 (0.0)	0.0 (0.0)	0.0 (0.0)	0.0 (0.0)	0.4 (1.0)	3.5 (8.9)
Average precipitation days (≥ 0.01 in)	9.9	9.3	10.6	10.4	10.6	10.4	10.7	9.4	8.6	8.4	8.3	10.1	116.7
Average snowy days (≥ 0.1 in)	0.7	0.6	0.0	0.0	0.0	0.0	0.0	0.0	0.0	0.0	0.0	0.1	1.4
Source: NOAA

=== Neighborhoods ===
- City Point – annexed in 1923
  - City Point National Cemetery

=== Adjacent counties ===
- Chesterfield County – north
- Prince George County – east, south, west
- Charles City County – northeast

=== National protected area ===
- Petersburg National Battlefield Park (part)

== Demographics ==
Historical population
Census	Pop.	Note	%±
1920	1,397		—
1930	11,327		710.8%
1940	8,679		−23.4%
1950	10,219		17.7%
1960	17,895		75.1%
1970	23,471		31.2%
1980	23,397		−0.3%
1990	23,101		−1.3%
2000	22,354		−3.2%
2010	22,591		1.1%
2020	23,033		2.0%
2025 (est.)	23,261	▲	1.0%
U.S. Decennial Census; 1790-1960 1900-1990; 1990-2000 2010-2020

=== Racial and ethnic composition ===
Hopewell city, Virginia – Racial and ethnic composition Note: the US Census treats Hispanic/Latino as an ethnic category. This table excludes Latinos from the racial categories and assigns them to a separate category. Hispanics/Latinos may be of any race.
Race / Ethnicity (NH = Non-Hispanic)	Pop 1980	Pop 1990	Pop 2000	Pop 2010	Pop 2020	% 1980	% 1990	% 2000	% 2010	% 2020
White alone (NH)	18,298	16,456	13,655	12,005	9,819	78.21%	71.24%	61.09%	53.14%	42.63%
Black or African American alone (NH)	4,622	5,863	7,414	8,216	9,689	19.75%	25.38%	33.17%	36.37%	42.07%
Native American or Alaska Native alone (NH)	31	63	75	78	86	0.13%	0.27%	0.34%	0.35%	0.37%
Asian alone (NH)	162	281	178	174	251	0.69%	1.22%	0.80%	0.77%	1.09%
Native Hawaiian or Pacific Islander alone (NH)	x	x	15	23	15	x	x	0.07%	0.10%	0.07%
Other race alone (NH)	54	21	24	37	129	0.23%	0.09%	0.11%	0.16%	0.56%
Mixed race or Multiracial (NH)	x	x	342	578	1,155	x	x	1.53%	2.56%	5.01%
Hispanic or Latino (any race)	230	417	651	1,480	1,889	0.98%	1.81%	2.91%	6.55%	8.20%
Total	23,397	23,101	22,354	22,591	23,033	100.00%	100.00%	100.00%	100.00%	100.00%

=== 2020 census ===
As of the 2020 census, Hopewell had a population of 23,033. The median age was 38.1 years; 23.8% of residents were under the age of 18 and 17.1% of residents were 65 years of age or older. For every 100 females there were 86.7 males, and for every 100 females age 18 and over there were 81.8 males age 18 and over.

100.0% of residents lived in urban areas, while 0.0% lived in rural areas.

There were 9,393 households in Hopewell, of which 31.9% had children under the age of 18 living in them. Of all households, 30.7% were married-couple households, 20.6% were households with a male householder and no spouse or partner present, and 40.1% were households with a female householder and no spouse or partner present. About 31.7% of all households were made up of individuals and 12.7% had someone living alone who was 65 years of age or older.

There were 10,409 housing units, of which 9.8% were vacant. The homeowner vacancy rate was 2.9% and the rental vacancy rate was 8.6%.

Racial composition as of the 2020 census
Race	Number	Percent
White	10,141	44.0%
Black or African American	9,852	42.8%
American Indian and Alaska Native	111	0.5%
Asian	254	1.1%
Native Hawaiian and Other Pacific Islander	20	0.1%
Some other race	968	4.2%
Two or more races	1,687	7.3%
Hispanic or Latino (of any race)	1,889	8.2%

=== 2000 census ===
As of the census of 2000, there were 22,354 people, 9,055 households, and 6,075 families residing in the city. The population density was 2,182.3 people per square mile (842.6 people/km^{2}). There were 9,749 housing units at an average density of 951.7 per square mile (367.5/km^{2}). The racial makeup of the city was 47.1% White, 43.5% Black, 0.8% Asian, 0.4% Native American, 0.1% Pacific Islander, 1.2% from other races, and 1.8% from two or more races. 3.7% of the population were Hispanic or Latino of any race.

There were 9,055 households, out of which 32.1% had children under the age of 18 living with them, 40.6% were married couples living together, 21.2% had a female householder with no husband present, and 32.9% were non-families. 27.6% of all households were made up of individuals, and 11.2% had someone living alone who was 65 years of age or older. The average household size was 2.43 and the average family size was 2.94.

The age of the population was spread out, with 26.7% under the age of 18, 9.1% from 18 to 24, 28.6% from 25 to 44, 21.0% from 45 to 64, and 14.6% who were 65 years of age or older. The median age was 35 years. For every 100 females, there were 87.7 males. For every 100 women aged 18 and over, there were 82.2 men.

The median income for a household in the city was $39,156, and the median income for a family was $49,730. Males had a median income of $34,849 versus $25,401 for females. The per capita income for the city was $21,041. About 15.8% of families and 17.73% of the population were below the poverty line, including 21.6% of those under age 18 and 10.4% of those age 65 or over.

== Education ==
The Hopewell City Public Schools division served 3,949 students in the 2024–25 school year. The schools in the district include:

=== High school ===
- Hopewell High School

=== Middle school ===
- Carter G. Woodson Middle School

=== Elementary schools ===
- Dupont Elementary School
- Harry E. James Elementary School
- Patrick Copeland Elementary School

All of the schools above are accredited by the Virginia Board of Education and by the Southern Association of Colleges and Schools.

=== Charter and technology ===
- Appomattox Regional Governor's School for the Arts And Technology Petersburg, VA, Open to students entering the 9th grade, with approval of passing through the admittance process.

=== Libraries ===
Appomattox Regional Library serves as the library system for Hopewell, Virginia.

== Notable people ==
- Robert Bolling and Jane Rolfe, colonists
- Nelson Barclift, choreographer
- Sam Bass, artist
- Curtis W. Harris, civil rights activist
- Charles Hardaway Marks, politician
- TreVeyon Henderson, American football player
- Seka, adult film actress
- Joey Peppersack, Paralympic swimmer
- Monsanto Pope, American football player
- Steven R. Taylor, politician
- Rebecca Beach Smith, judge
- Lamar Giles, American author
- Darrell Taylor, American football player

== Media ==
The Hopewell News, locally managed and operated by HPC Media, was an 8,000 circulation twice-weekly newspaper that covers local news, sports and events of interest to the communities of Hopewell, Enon and Prince George. For more than 90 years, The Hopewell News served the greater Hopewell and Prince George communities. The paper was shut down on January 18, 2018. HPC Media also published the News-Patriot newspaper covering Colonial Heights and communities in Southeastern Chesterfield County.

== Climate ==
The climate in this area is characterized by hot, humid summers and generally mild to cool winters. According to the Köppen Climate Classification system, Hopewell has a humid subtropical climate, abbreviated "Cfa" on climate maps.

== Politics ==
Hopewell was, for many decades after 1952, a Republican stronghold in presidential elections. However, in 2008, the city saw a significant shift toward the Democratic party when it voted for Barack Obama by double digits, the best Democratic performance there since 1948. In every election since then (except for 2016) Democrats have consistently maintained their double-digit lead in the city.

United States presidential election results for Hopewell, Virginia
Year	Republican		Democratic		Third party(ies)	
Year	No.	%	No.	%	No.	%
1916	3	10.71%	24	85.71%	1	3.57%
1920	41	29.50%	97	69.78%	1	0.72%
1924	206	41.96%	277	56.42%	8	1.63%
1928	505	51.17%	482	48.83%	0	0.00%
1932	342	25.91%	957	72.50%	21	1.59%
1936	332	20.11%	1,309	79.29%	10	0.61%
1940	308	23.88%	981	76.05%	1	0.08%
1944	368	22.21%	1,284	77.49%	5	0.30%
1948	570	28.77%	1,242	62.70%	169	8.53%
1952	1,640	49.58%	1,657	50.09%	11	0.33%
1956	1,908	53.91%	1,388	39.22%	243	6.87%
1960	2,169	54.24%	1,805	45.14%	25	0.63%
1964	3,183	55.93%	2,498	43.89%	10	0.18%
1968	2,942	43.63%	1,568	23.25%	2,233	33.12%
1972	5,229	75.88%	1,485	21.55%	177	2.57%
1976	3,764	48.21%	3,691	47.28%	352	4.51%
1980	4,423	56.19%	3,102	39.41%	347	4.41%
1984	5,661	68.27%	2,564	30.92%	67	0.81%
1988	4,672	63.48%	2,566	34.86%	122	1.66%
1992	3,818	47.48%	2,863	35.60%	1,361	16.92%
1996	3,493	49.46%	2,868	40.61%	701	9.93%
2000	3,749	53.73%	3,024	43.34%	205	2.94%
2004	4,251	53.57%	3,573	45.02%	112	1.41%
2008	4,149	43.56%	5,285	55.49%	90	0.94%
2012	3,739	41.40%	5,179	57.35%	113	1.25%
2016	3,885	43.13%	4,724	52.44%	399	4.43%
2020	4,020	41.84%	5,430	56.52%	158	1.64%
2024	3,838	42.52%	5,078	56.26%	110	1.22%
