= Beacon Theatre (Hopewell, Virginia) =

Historic theater in Virginia, US

- U.S. National Register of Historic Places
- U.S. Historic district – Contributing property
- Virginia Landmarks Register
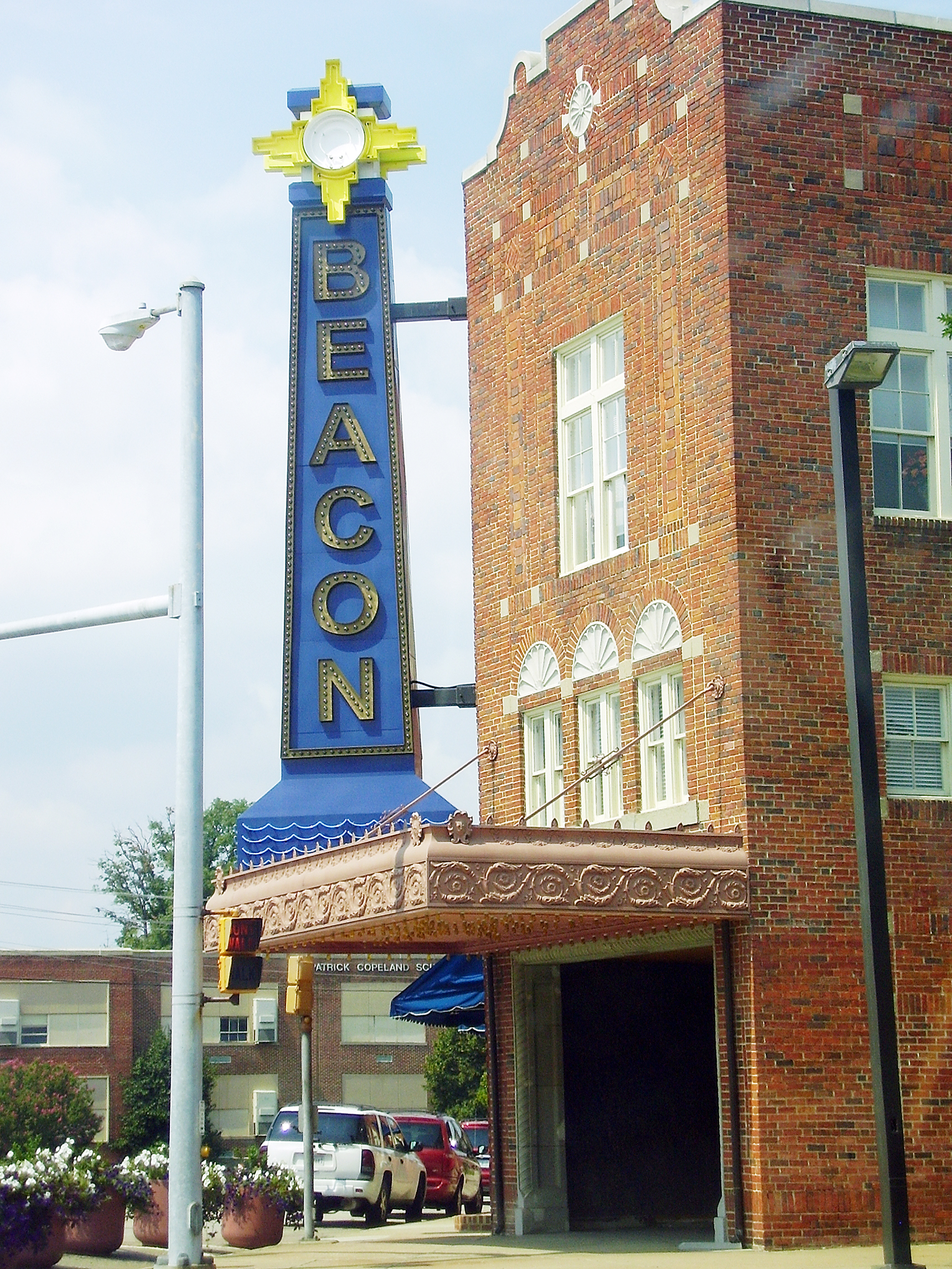
- Beacon Theatre, May, 2007

- Location within Virginia Location within the United States
- Location: 401 N. Main St., Hopewell, Virginia
- Coordinates: 37°18′16″N 77°17′15″W
- Area: less than one acre
- Built: 1928
- Architect: Edwards, Osbert L.; Bishop, Fred
- Architectural style: Colonial Revival, Art Deco
- NRHP reference No.: 00001434
- VLR No.: 116-0010

Significant dates
- Added to NRHP: November 22, 2000
- Designated VLR: June 14, 2000

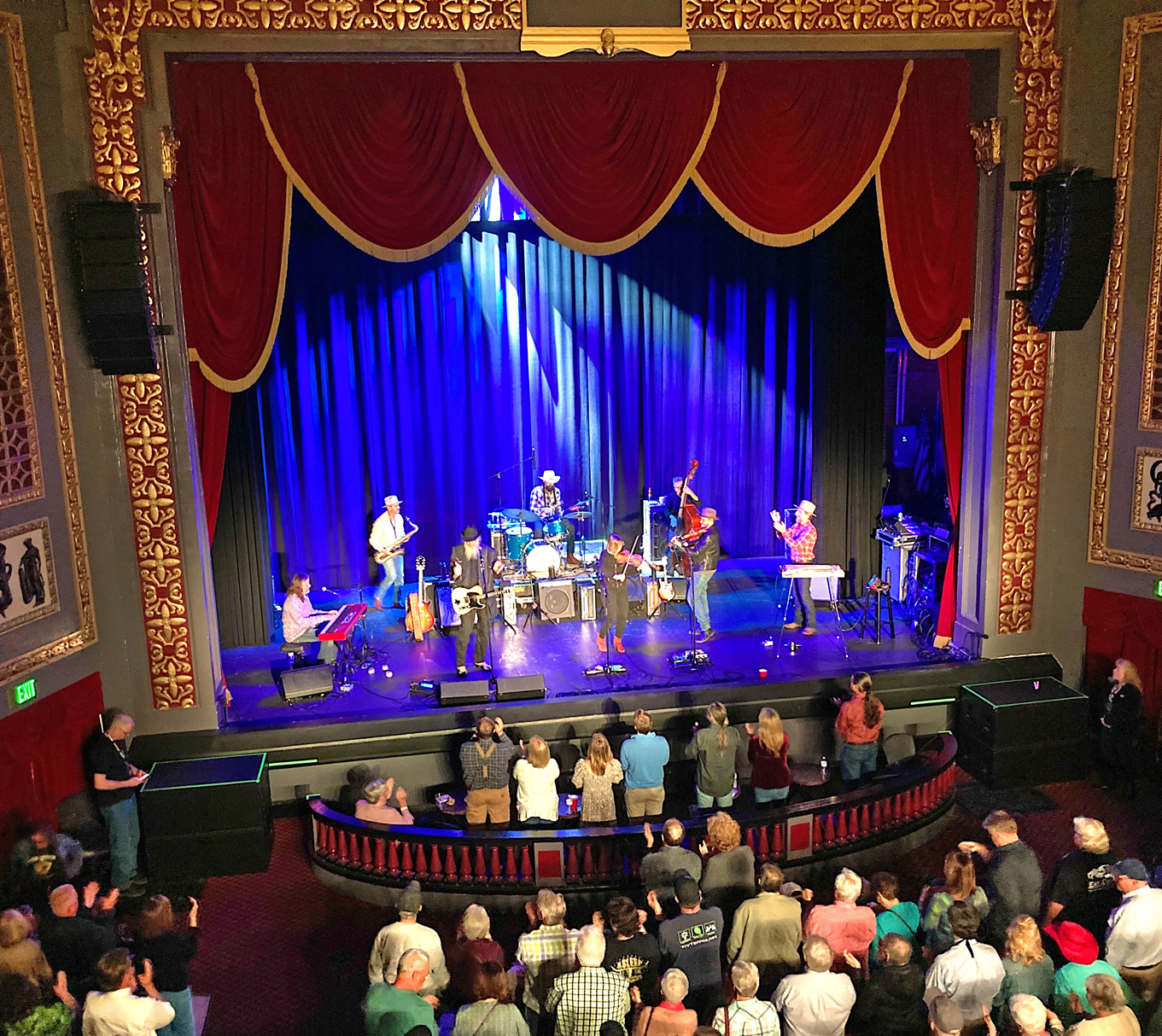
The interior of the Beacon Theatre in Hopewell, Virginia. The Western swing band Asleep at the Wheel performed in concert in April 2022.

Beacon Theatre, also known as the Broadway Theatre and Pythian Lodge, is a historic theatre building located at Hopewell, Virginia.

== History ==
It was built in 1928, and is a three-story, vaudeville and movie theater with storefront commercial space, second-floor apartments and third-floor meeting space. It has Colonial Revival and Art Deco style details. The building features decorative bands of flush brickwork punctuated with rectangular cast-stone corner blocks and cast-stone detailing in the parapet coping; the theater is adorned with classical plaster friezes, an elaborate proscenium, and a cove ceiling in the auditorium. The Beacon Theatre remained a theater offering live performances and movies until it closed in 1981. It later reopened.

It was listed on the National Register of Historic Places in 2000.
